= Read or Die =

Japanese light novel series

- Cover of first light novel volume

リード・オア・ダイ (Rīdo Oa Dai)
- Genre: Action, spy, thriller
- Manga
- Written by: Hideyuki Kurata
- Illustrated by: Shutaro Yamada
- Published by: Shueisha
- English publisher: NA: Viz Media
- Magazine: Ultra Jump
- Original run: December 18, 1999 – May 18, 2002
- Volumes: 4
- Light novel
- Written by: Hideyuki Kurata
- Illustrated by: Taraku Uon
- Published by: Shueisha
- Imprint: Super Dash Bunko
- Original run: July 14, 2000 – present
- Volumes: 12
- Manga

R.O.D Rehabilitation
- Written by: Hideyuki Kurata
- Illustrated by: Choko Fuji
- Published by: Shueisha
- Magazine: Super Dash & Go!
- Original run: February 25, 2012 – December 25, 2012
- Volumes: 1
- Related
- Read or Die (OVA); Read or Dream; R.O.D the TV

R.O.D: Read or Die (Japanese: リード・オア・ダイ, Hepburn: Rīdo Oa Dai) is a Japanese light novel series written by Hideyuki Kurata, published under Shueisha's Super Dash Bunko imprint. Read or Die follows Yomiko Readman, codename "The Paper", an agent for the (fictional) Special Operations Division of the British Library. (Note: R.O.D Official Archive, p. 124. "The King's Library, built on the ground floor of the British Museum's East Wing, was not fully open to the general public until 1857. The 'British Library' as we know it today was created in 1973 as a result of the British Library Act 1972." Therefore, the British Library of the R.O.D universe is located in a fictional underground base of the British Museum.) There are twelve Read or Die novels, though in June 2016, it was announced via Twitter that a thirteenth (and final) volume was set to be released. Kurata confessed in a 2021 interview with long-time collaborator Masashi Ishihama (who served as animation director of the OVA and TV series) that to date, he has not continued with the novel project and has no immediate plans to do so. As of 2025, there are no plans for when Kurata will release the final installment.

Along with the novels, Kurata scripted the official R.O.D manga illustrated by Shutaro Yamada, which was originally published in Ultra Jump magazine and later printed into four paperback volumes, as well as Read or Dream, a manga illustrated by Ran Ayanaga set in the same universe as Read or Die.

The popularity of the Read or Die novels and manga resulted in the production of an OVA adaptation in 2001, which was directed by Koji Masunari and produced by SME Visual Works. In 2003, Aniplex produced R.O.D the TV, a 26-episode animated television series, which served as a sequel to the OVA and introduced Read or Dream's characters to those from Read or Die. (Note: R.O.D Official Archive, p. 71. "The idea crafted within the novel spread to an anime and comics, with various media loosely interacting with one another to expand on the 'R.O.D' world. [...] A few of the story's key elements [in the novels], such as Mr. Gentleman's desire to achieve immortality, were preserved in the anime that followed.") (Note: Animage, March 2004. "As the story progresses, the reality of the sisters' origin is revealed by Joker. It becomes clear that Anita's hidden past goes deeper. [...] The flames in Anita's memory are due to Yomiko. [...] This month, we will explain in detail the link with the OVA version. The three sisters who were living in Japan were suddenly surrounded by the British Library, who were involved in a worldwide siege.") (Note: Animage, March 2004. "Joker-san and his agents are secretly working to take over the UK, then Yomiko and Nancy appear. And their memories are stored in seven books. Who on earth is the Gentleman? To understand the second half of 'ROD -THE TV-', you need to watch the OVA. It has become necessary to look back at the previous version. Let's organize the complicated relationships between the characters [of the TV series] along with the story of the OVA version!")

A manga called R.O.D Rehabilitation illustrated by Choko Fuji was published in 2012 in Shueisha's Super Dash & Go magazine, and collected in one volume. The comic tells the story of a future city created by bibliomaniacs in exile, "Bibliopolis." (Note: Mantan Web, 2012. "[R.O.D Rehabilitation] is a completely new work written by Hideyuki Kurata with artwork by the young illustrator Fujichoko, who has attracted attention [on social media]. [...] Mr. Kurata says, 'Yomiko is a character [who was] created [to reflect] the positive side of love for books, but Yomi-meko [of the new manga] is the opposite of that, the dark side.'")

When Koji Masunari, director of the anime, was asked in 2005 by Anime News Network if any of the story arcs or characters' backstories presented in the novels would ever see an anime version, he explained: "As far as whether any other stories from the original would ever become an anime, we don't think so. In the future, if there is a new anime, it would come from an original work someplace. It would be adaptations of new stuff that haven't yet been written." That said, it was announced in 2016 that a new R.O.D anime series was pitched (as of 2025, there have been no further announcements).

== Plot ==
Read or Die takes place in an alternate history world where the British Empire has remained a major superpower. The Empire's continued existence is guaranteed by the British Library (大英図書館, Daiei-toshokan), an external intelligence agency working underneath the British Museum; its Special Operations Division (the British Secret Intelligence Service, more widely known as MI6) is also often mentioned, despite Kurata's editors (erroneously) telling him it no longer existed.

The series follows Yomiko Readman, also known as "The Paper", a superhuman agent of the Library's Special Operations (possessing a "double 0" certification that denotes a "license to kill", as in the James Bond series, although she rarely invokes it). In both the novels and manga, her adventures alternate between doing missions for the British Library and helping young novelist Nenene Sumiregawa.

Only the first novel and first manga have similar stories, involving rescuing Nenene Sumiregawa from a vicious kidnapper. Otherwise, the novels, manga, and animated versions of the stories have divergent plotlines. While characterizations are usually consistent even when storylines are not, some characters have different origins in different versions of the story, or do not appear at all. For instance, a prominent character named Jiggy Stardust (a "resident paper expert" of the British Library) was only ever introduced in the novels (Book 3) as well as Wendy's co-worker, Karen. Other key characters, such as Faust, a powerful Paper Master who was kept prisoner by the British Library as he held ulterior ties with the Library's sworn enemy, Dokusensha makes his debut in Novel 4. Likewise, the matriarch of Dokusensha who is arguably as ancient and powerful as the Library's Mr. Gentleman, a kung fu artist called "Grandma" (a.k.a. China) is introduced at the end of Novel 6. Furthermore, a team of Chinese Paper Masters (Hoi Mei, Hakuri Yuu, Rin Rii and Gai Kou) who have no relation to the Paper Sisters become hired hands for Grandma, then later, allies of Yomiko. Another important Paper Master, Wang Yan (also transliterated as Ou-En depending on the characters used) is cast as a main protagonist in the later books, notably in Volume 12. None of these characters, despite their vital presence in the novels, are ever referred to in the manga or the anime.

=== Novel Volume 1 ===
Yomiko Readman, a half-Japanese, half-English field agent for the British Library Special Operations Division, is employed as a substitute teacher at a Japanese institution, Bunkyo High School. Unusually obsessed with books and able to channel telekinetic abilities as a paper manipulator (referred to as "Paper Users" or "Paper Masters" in-universe depending on transliterations), she meets 17-year-old Nenene Sumiregawa, an established YA author who was a literary prodigy at just 13 years old.

Though Yomiko exhibits an aloof, often spacey demeanor which stands as a stark contrast to Nenene's bold aggression and tantrums, the two young women somehow find a common connection as Nenene hammers away at her latest manuscript in the school library, which leads to them spending the night together in Nenene's apartment, bonding through their love of books and humour. Yomiko especially opens up to the possibility of another relationship as she had lost her lover, Donny Nakajima under unusual, tragic circumstances.

However, an unhinged individual is on the prowl, Scissorhands, and soon, he targets Nenene and abducts her in plain sight. Yomiko embarks on a personal mission to rescue her, coming to terms with her deeper feelings for Nenene and her need for a meaningful friendship.

=== Novel Volume 2 ===
Yomiko and Nenene, in attendance for the opening of possibly the largest bookstore in the world, "Babel Books," become accidentally entwined in a surprise terrorist attack, orchestrated by Red, Inc. While the plot takes a backseat to Yomiko and Nenene's budding friendship, the second installment introduces Yomiko's companion and the on-call mercenary for the American troops hired by the British Library, Drake Anderson, as well as the powerful, elusive Mr. Gentleman in the flesh - the source of Great Britain as a global superpower.

The most climatic moment occurs as Yomiko leaps out of harm's way with Nenene secured in her arms, dangling from a roll of toilet paper forty stories above ground. In the end, Yomiko defeats the terrorists and emerges from the ruined building mostly unscathed, overjoyed to be reunited with an elated Nenene. Once more, Yomiko leaves Nenene behind, returning home to pay her respects to the shrine of her ex-lover, Donny.

== Characters ==
=== British Library ===
The British Library is an institution devoted to the promotion of literacy. The British Library is a political organization with branches all over the world. The organization is led by Gentleman (ジェントルメン, Jentorumen), an old man of extreme longevity and the power behind the throne of the British Empire.

The British Library Special Operations Division (大英図書館 特殊工作部, Daiei-toshokan Tokushu-kousakubu) is the secret enforcement branch of the British Library. Based in a giant underground complex concealed beneath the Great Court at the British Museum, the Special Operations Division employs a number of agents with special powers and runs operations all over the world to fight book-related crime and terrorism, and to acquire rare works for the Library. Their slogan is "Peace to the books of the world, an iron hammer to those who would abuse them, and glory and wisdom to the British Empire!"

- Yomiko Readman (読子・リードマン, Yomiko Rīdoman) is a half-Japanese, half-English papermaster (紙使い, kamitsukai), an individual with the ability to control and influence paper. A substitute teacher in her spare time, she is the 19th British Library agent to earn the codename "The Paper" (ザ・ペーパー, Za Pēpā). Her name is a play on her nature as a bibliomaniac—the verb "to read" in Japanese is pronounced yomu.
- Joker (ジョーカー, Jōkā) is the acting head of the Special Operations Division. A stereotypical Englishman, Joker's coolheadedness and silver tongue are his primary weapons. Though outwardly loyal and humble, Joker secretly wishes to be the actual head of the Division as it would allow him to gain control over the whole country.
- Wendy Earhart (ウェンディ・イアハート, Wendi Iahāto) is a half-Indian, half-English girl. She joined the Special Operations Division at 19 years old, and soon became Joker's personal secretary. She is earnest and devoted, but clumsy and still an "in training" assistant.
- Jiggy Stardust (ジギー・スターダスト, Jigī Sutādasuto) is the Special Operations Division's resident scientist, an aging man whose knowledge of paper is unrivaled. He developed the combat-use paper (戦闘用紙, sentōyōgami) Yomiko uses.
- Nancy Makuhari (ナンシー・幕張, Nanshī Makuhari) is a 26-year-old agent; in the novels, Joker recruits her in China. Codenamed: "Miss Deep" (ミス・ディープ, Misu Dīpu), due to her special power of "Diving" which allows her to become intangible and pass through solid objects. However, "Diving" can be suppressed through the use of paper charms (御札, ofuda). Nancy does not appear in the manga, and has a different origin in the anime where she is one of two clones of Mata Hari.
- Drake Anderson (ドレイク・アンダーソン, Doreiku Andāson) is a veteran of the American special forces turned mercenary, employed by the Special Operations Division as a field support operative for their agents. Drake is a hardened, no-nonsense soldier who, though lacking any kind of special powers, is incredibly strong and possesses considerable combat experience. Anderson has a young daughter named Maggie, whom he cares for deeply (Maggie Anderson is not to be confused with Maggie Mui from Read or Dream). He is also kind-hearted and will not harm children, even if it goes against the mission.

=== Dokusensha ===
Dokusensha (読仙社) is the series' main antagonist, a secret organization based in Sichuan devoted to Chinese supremacy and led by China (チャイナ, Chaina). Known as Grandma (おばあさん, Obaa-san) to Dokusensha's high-ranked agents, China is a "little girl" who, like Gentleman, has lived for a long enough time to know the hidden history of humankind.

=== Supporting characters ===
- Nenene Sumiregawa (菫川 ねねね, Sumiregawa Nenene) is a world-famous Japanese author. Her debut novel Kimi ga Boku o Shitteru (君が僕を知ってる) was written when she was just 13-years-old. Nenene became acquainted with Yomiko when she worked briefly as a substitute teacher at the latter's school. The two would meet again and soon become good friends after Yomiko rescues Nenene from a crazed fan who tried to abduct her.
- Donnie Nakajima (ドニー・ナカジマ, Donī Nakajima) is Yomiko's deceased mentor and lover. He was the agent who held the title of "The Paper" before Yomiko, he died at her hands under mysterious circumstances, yet Yomiko recalls that she killed him with her power. She now wears his glasses in his memory, and believes that reading through them enables him to continue reading as well.
- Faust (ファウスト, Fausuto) is a prisoner of the British Library. Like Gentleman and China, he has lived for hundreds of years and, because of it, Gentleman trapped him to hide certain secrets.

== Media ==
=== Light novels ===
No.	Release date	ISBN
1	July 14, 2000	4-08-630002-8
2	October 25, 2000	4-08-630014-1
3	March 23, 2001	4-08-630026-5
4	July 25, 2001	4-08-630040-0
5	December 21, 2001	4-08-630062-1
6	July 25, 2002	4-08-630087-7
7	December 19, 2002	4-08-630105-9
8	July 25, 2003	4-08-630136-9
9	February 25, 2004	4-08-630169-5
10	July 23, 2004	4-08-630192-X
11	February 24, 2006	4-08-630280-2
12	August 25, 2016	978-4-08-630765-9

=== Manga ===
The Read or Die manga series was written by Hideyuki Kurata, illustrated by Shutaro Yamada, and published in Shueisha's Ultra Jump from December 18, 1999 (January 2000 issue) to May 18, 2002 (June 2002 issue). It was later collected into four bound volumes by Shueisha and later licensed for translation and release in North America by Viz Media.

==== Volume list ====
No.	Title	Original release date	North American release date
1	Mr. Woo's Woes	October 19, 2000; 4-08-876082-4	March 21, 2006; 978-1-4215-0248-9
Episodes 1-8; Postscript
2	Ancient Chinese Secrets	June 19, 2001; 4-08-876175-8	May 16, 2006; 978-1-4215-0257-1
Episodes 9-15; Episode 16: Bonus Chapter; Postscript
3	Reading Can Be Deadly	January 18, 2002; 4-08-876263-0	July 18, 2006; 978-1-4215-0508-4
Episodes 17-23; Author's Note
4	Dear Deadly Diary	July 19, 2002; 4-08-876329-7	September 19, 2006; 978-1-4215-0509-1
Episodes 24-30; Postscript

=== OVA ===
Based on the characters of the Read or Die light novels and manga, the OVA series was directed by Koji Masunari and animated by Studio Deen. It was released from 2001 to 2002 in Japan, and was distributed outside Japan in 2003 by Manga Entertainment. Although the story features established characters such as Yomiko Readman and Joker, it is not a continuation of the Read or Die storyline detailed in either the novels or the manga. (Note: R.O.D Official Archive, 2013, p. 80. "Familiar faces gather at the ruins of an ancient tomb. [...] [Episode 9] marks [Drake's] first appearance in the television series." He meets Nenene, but offers no indication of knowing her.) (Note: R.O.D Official Archive, 2013, p. 93. "[In Episode 22] Nenene proceeds to become a willing hostage [for Wendy and the British Library]." Once more, Nenene and Wendy speak to each other like it's their first time.) (Note: R.O.D Official Archive, 2013, p. 113. Kurata: " 'R.O.D' was always intended to be a mixed media project, so each incarnation tells its own separate story, but you are able to gain a deeper understanding of the 'R.O.D' world as a whole by experiencing all of them together.") (Note: In the final chapter of the manga, Joker's hands are sliced clean off by a rival Paper Master, Ridley as an act of revenge for what he and Mr. Gentleman did to his friend, Donnie. While Joker is seen with prosthetics in the Epilogue as he meets with Mr. Gentleman at the British Library, his handicap is neither mentioned nor seen in the anime version, the OVA or the TV series given that all R.O.D stories follow a separate canon. Not to mention, Nenene, Wendy and Drake are introduced to one another in both the novels (for example, on p. 70 in novel five, the accompanied illustration by Taraku Uon depicts Wendy and Nenene arguing in Yomiko's Tokyo apartment and subsequently, in Yomiko's flat on Baker Street), and the last volume of the manga; however, they act like utter strangers in the anime when they finally meet in Episode 9 and Episode 22 of the TV series.)

=== Anime ===
R.O.D the TV is a 26-episode anime television sequel to the Read or Die OVA, animated by J.C.Staff and produced by Aniplex, directed by Koji Masunari and scripted by Hideyuki Kurata, about the adventures of three paper-manipulating sisters, Michelle, Maggie and Anita, who become the bodyguards of Nenene Sumiregawa. Its official title of R.O.D -THE TV- is a catch-all acronym referring to the inclusion of characters from both the Read or Die novels, manga and OVA and the Read or Dream manga, which revolves solely around the Paper Sisters.

=== R.O.D Official Archive ===
In 2010, to commemorate the Blu-ray release of the anime, Udon Entertainment released an official guide book of the series, featuring promotional artwork, detailed profiles of the characters, episode summaries and staff commentaries breaking down story elements from both the anime version and backstories that are more relevant in the novels (such as Yomiko's lover, Donnie), an interview with the staff and a detailed timeline of the R.O.D universe with the publication dates of each work, including descriptions of arcs that either crossover into the anime or are self-contained. An English translation was published in 2013.

== Production ==
In a promotional booklet published with the first edition of Volume 12, Kurata admitted that while it had been years since the release of Volume 11, he had "never forgotten about R.O.D," only that he procrastinated with other tasks or worked on other projects. "The more time passes, the more I feel I can't understand what R.O.D started off as," he said. While at the train station one day, he read an article from a magazine which, by chance, discussed where he had last left off with Yomiko's arc and from there, he was propelled to continue her story with the Gutenberg Paper and Mr. Gentleman. However, he noted that he struggled with writing Yomiko again after being away from the story for so long. He spent about a year outlining the main plot and four years writing the manuscript. "Somehow I couldn't introduce Yomiko in the same way as before," he related. "Writers say that their characters are their children, but if you leave them alone for 10 years, of course things will change. [...] I was completely overwhelmed."

Though he stated that he already had an idea for the plot of Volume 13, which was meant to center around the origin story of Yomiko and Donnie, in 2021, he claimed in an interview that he had yet to write a draft. "I turned down the offer to [write the manuscripts for the long-running] Dragon Ball Z [franchise] — once. Because, the sequel to R.O.D by the same publisher, Super Dash Bunko hasn't even been written yet. I feel so bad for the editors [because I promised them a thirteenth volume in 2016]."

== Reception ==
=== Manga ===
Honolulu Star-Bulletin shed special focus on Joker's characterization as a recurring villain, believing that he "is a more complex man than it would appear on the surface" given that throughout the chapters, the layers of his facade gradually peel away to reveal a truly sinister character who manipulates Yomiko for his personal agenda from the beginning. He effectively deceives her through falsehoods that he could be her friend and only ever has her best interest at heart when in fact, it is quite the opposite, committing ulterior motives behind Yomiko's back. They further commended the manga's separation from the OVA, writing that the focus here is "more on developing the character of Yomiko and her tragic past" which also stands as a solid example of "a great character development device," elaborating: "[S]he ends up killing [her boyfriend Donnie] under mysterious circumstances."

Though Caitlin Donnovan of The Mary Sue praised R.O.D the TV, was fair towards the OVA and named Read or Dream as "lighthearted fun," she argued that the Read or Die manga was "pretty gross" and believed the characters were "way less empowered" than in R.O.D the TV. She went on to criticize its portrayal of kidnapping, near-rape scenes, sexual assault, and gore.

Danika Ellis of Lesbrary noted that she picked up the manga series due to Yomiko's appeal as a bookish heroine and looked forward to the not-so-subtle lesbian subtext of Yomiko and Nenene's friendship. However, she pointed out that the pair's "relationship never quite becomes text, but it comes very, very close in the first manga. Think Xena and Gabrielle." This left her underwhelmed that the work was not the yuri manga she was hoping it to be.

Sean Gaffney, guest writing for Erica Friedman's online publication Okazu, stated in his critique of Volume 1 that as an admirer of the previous R.O.D incarnations, Nenene was singled out as "clearly the highlight" of the manga universe as "[i]t's hard to ruin [her as a] likeable audience identification character in amongst all these superheroes and supervillains." He emphasized Yomiko as a flawed heroine, though criticized how this aspect was executed, complaining that she was "unbalanced" and an unrelatable "headcase." He further panned the lack of subtlety in the writing, a narrative device that the anime, he felt, excelled in. "The anime were both rather oblique in the way they handled characterization," he explained, "especially in their plot revelations."

In a review of the first volume for IGN, A.E. Sparrow praised the mix of humor and drama along with the tasteful sex appeal and the artwork by Shutaro Yamada, which he said was "a cut above the rest. Villains are over-the-top evil, Yomiko is at once comical and sexy within the span of a panel." He concluded that he appreciated how Kurata paced Yomiko's backstory.

Publishers Weekly stated that in spite of "the story's silliness and some confusing storytelling, amusing in-jokes, as when Yomiko dresses as various manga heroines like Sailor Moon or like references to Stephen King's Misery, are worth the wait."

Of Volume 4, Carlos Santos writing for Anime News Network thought the series' conclusion was "a surefire formula for excitement—but not so much for strong storytelling." He criticized the first half for being "a chaotic mess" in its "totally forgettable [story] arc" featuring the Manshu Academy, though found Yomiko's confrontation with Ridley Wan, an opposing Paper Master with ties to her deceased lover, Donnie to be worth the investment. However, Joker's entrance during the climax was identified as "predictable. " He explained: "[A]nyone familiar with how bad guys operate in action-adventure should see [Joker's revelation] coming." Despite this, he noted that the backstory detailing the relationship and conflict between Yomiko, Donnie and Ridley was "the most rewarding" feature. "It tells an entire story in just a couple of chapters, and yet that story is the foundation of everything that's led up to [the climatic events]."

=== Light novels ===
Yatta-Tachi praised the novel franchise overall, arguing that the writing portrayed convincingly the themes of censorship and media control, favorably comparing the books to other such works as the game Metal Gear Solid 2: Sons of Liberty, Library War, Tatakau Shisho, and Ghost in the Shell: Stand Alone Complex. They elaborated: "Read or Die literally makes certain supernatural books sources of dominance. Dokusensha and the British Library are both maintaining information control on the East and the West respectively. Both have important head figures who have lived for millennia. Mr. Gentleman governs the British Library and a mysterious lady named China leads the Dokusensha." Mr. Gentleman is mainly a plot device, they clarified, "to bring back the British Empire's former glory. It may sound ridiculous but the premise should not surprise you considering the fantasy."

Likewise, Tanoshimi analyzed the franchise as a whole as "a hodgepodge of several genres that is handled really well even across mediums, and morphs as it moves from one to another. It's like looking through a kaleidoscope—all the versions differ from each, but they also share many elements." They continued, explaining that "there exist two universes in R.O.D: one where the sisters exist and Yomiko disappears (anime version), and another where there are no sisters, but Yomiko and Nenene stay together (novels' version)." They pointed out that the main antagonists of the novels, Dokusensha versus the "clusterf*ck" of villains in the anime are given more development in their motives as well as sympathetic agents. They further underscored the strength in Nenene and Wendy's friendship as "one of the most charming aspects of the novels" that is absent from the anime as well as Yomiko's backstory with her boyfriend, Donnie, who was not only a best mate to Joker prior to his death, but a pivotal influence in Yomiko succeeding him as "The Paper." Her personality had changed dramatically after she lost him as Joker verbally observes, which is only touched upon briefly in the anime. Ultimately: "after reading the novels, it feels like you're not seeing the characters' true natures [in the anime] despite all media working together."

Erica Friedman gave an overwhelmingly positive review for Volume 1. While she noted that the book depicted scenes of stronger violence opposed to previous R.O.D works, antagonists emulated "extra creepy nuttiness thrown in for good measure" and Yomiko as a protagonist felt fully rounded. "Yomiko did definitely kill Donny," she explained, pointing out that Yomiko's past with her tragic lover had been open-ended in the manga and anime, "in order, she says, to become The Paper. As she so succinctly puts it, 'He chose me over books – I chose books over him.'" She further praised Yomiko's complexeties, writing: "She is very disturbed, that is clear. Her bibliomania is an advanced Obsessive-Compulsive Disorder, yes. But despite the first chapter, once she meets Nenene, she becomes instantly sweeter, more human and more sympathetic."

Critiquing Volume 4, Friedman was let down by the lack of scenes between Yomiko and Nenene, though she was pleased with the introduction of Faust, Dokusensha's 400-year-old Paper Master who has embodied the rejuvenated appearance of a pre-teen child for centuries. "He looks, honestly, like Junior with his hair cut short," she noted, "and a 'I know something you don't' smile. He was a nice addition to the team, because while his abilities are strictly in the not-dying capacity, he's a good strategist and a fast thinker," which challenges Yomiko and Drake in "carry[ing] out the tactics."

In an advance reader copy review, Hosokawa of Subaru NOW hailed Volume 12 of the light novel franchise as "the climax of [all] climaxes." He thought the latest work was "adrenaline pumping," spotlighting Yomiko's natural development as a heroine, demonstrating that she was a strong female character with layers. Though he admitted he was satisfied with the conclusion, he also expressed that he was looking forward to the next installment. Yohei Kuu, writing for Aoi Media held the opinion that "the cuteness of Sumiregawa-sensei and Wendy is the selling point of this work [...] so it's a shame that they don't appear much [in this installment]." Syosetu wrote that "the depth of the story [in Volume 12] is firmly and lightly packed into this short novel. There weren't any high expectations since the recent anime that Kurata-san has been involved in has not been very interesting, but [this book] was truly wonderful."

In a more critical essay compiled in Shinchō, columnist Asa Tanaka voiced her disapproval of illustrator Taraku Uon's artwork, which had obviously transformed from his early career from "soft caricatures" to "high contrast black and white images" that lacked any rough qualities, appearing too neat. "The drawings have changed so much that it's no longer nostalgic," she commented. However, she was pleased with the near closure of Faust's character arc, who was introduced as Yomiko's adversary in the early novels, a morally grey character who was a spy for Dokusensha and had tricked Yomiko, though eventually became her complicated-companion-turned-dubious-foe-again, and underscored Drake's growth as a central protagonist in one of the chapters. She felt confused that Nenene was not as big of a character as she hoped since she was only present in Chapter 1 (accompanied by Wendy and Shark, a male character from earlier books), and was disappointed that the story was left incomplete.

Tsundoku Reader called the novel "interesting" and "wild", outlining that the series' main antagonist, Gentleman ultimately met his downfall in "a rampage [where he] had his wisdom taken from him by Faust, and ended his life as a human." They further stated that the story was full of sacrifices, depicting ominous climaxes for key characters. In conclusion: "The writing style is quite sophisticated."

Erica Friedman in her essay for Okazu summed up her impression by saying: "The bulk of the book is a series of extended battle scenes. China and Gentleman duke it out for dozens of pages, some of which include Yomiko saying '…!' or just '!' " She voiced her disappointment with how jarring and strange the story became, stating: "Hire a ghost writer [Kurata-san] if you have no ideas. If the series had wrapped up in Volume 10, as it should have done, even if it were a mash of incoherent whatever, it would have been acceptable. But waiting this long for incoherent whatever is just vexxing." She concluded with a scathing remark: "[This series] died an ignominious death."

=== R.O.D Rehabilitation ===
Erica Friedman, the founder of Yuricon, expressed in her blog Okazu that Kurata's spinoff manga "seemed like it would be sure-fire win," pointing out that while "old Yomiko" of the light novels and original manga run was "pretty much nuts, with a dark streak of delusion," in the spinoff, which functions as an alternate universe where the British Library has swung the opposite way, hiring bibliophile agents to "kill books" opposed to retrieving and preserving them a la a Ray Bradbury dystopia, "[a]pparently what the creators meant" by presenting a much darker Yomiko is exactly within these bleak narrative rules. Therefore, "it's probably a good idea to think of her as a completely different character, rather than the return of any Yomiko we know," noted Friedman. "Not surprisingly," she added, "I am not a fan of the new character design, which feels like they dug through Peach-Pit's dumpsters for design ideas." Having only read two serialized chapters in Super Dash Bunko's magazine publication of the manga at the time of reviewing, she withheld giving the work a definitive score. However, she summed up her criticism by saying: "Moe girl in gritty Speed Grapher-esque world. [...] No Nenene [on the lack of a yuri angle] and it looks like her partner for this series might be a guy," rating the artwork a 7 out of a possible 10.

== Bibliography ==
- Kurata, Hideyuki (March 6, 2001) [January 18, 2002]. "Ultra Reading King YOMIOH: Special Stream-of-Consciousness Ramblings Upon the Release of Volume Three". R.O.D Read or Die: Vol. 3 (Manga). Japan: スーパーダッシュ文庫 (Super Dash Bunko). ISBN 1421505088.
- Kurata, Hideyuki (December 21, 2001). R.O.D Read or Die: Book 5 (Light Novel). Japan: 株式会社集英社 (Shueisha), スーパーダッシュ文庫 (Super Dash Bunko) (in Japanese).
- Kurata, Hideyuki (July 19, 2002). "Ultra Reading King YOMIOH: Hideyuki Kurata vs. Shutaro Yamada!". R.O.D Read or Die: Vol. 4 (Manga). Japan: スーパーダッシュ文庫 (Super Dash Bunko). ISBN 4088763297.
- Aniplex (2010). R.O.D The Complete Blu-ray BOX (Booklet). Japan: Studio ORPHEE, Aniplex Inc., Aoyomiou (in Japanese).
- Thompson, Jason (2012). Manga: The Complete Guide. United States: Random House Worlds. ISBN 978-0-345-53944-1.
- Hayashi, Kirie M. (January 15, 2013). "Character Profiles; Story Guide; 'R.O.D' Main Staff Interview; Glossary". R.O.D Official Archive. Japan: Udon Entertainment Group. ISBN 978-1-926778-62-4.
- Kurata, Hideyuki (August 25, 2016). "YOMIOH: Over the past decade... To celebrate the release of 'R.O.D - Volume 12'". R.O.D Read or Die: Book 12 (Light Novel). Japan: スーパーダッシュ文庫 (Super Dash Bunko) (in Japanese).
- Ishihama, Masashi (February 14, 2023) [2021]. "Interviews - Conversation: Masashi Ishihama x Hideyuki Kurata cross talk". Masashi Ishihama Animation Works. Japan: Impress Holding, Inc. (in Japanese).
