= Read or Die (OVA) =

Original video animation based on the manga of the same name by Hideyuki Kurata

- DVD cover of Read or Die
- Genre: Action, spy, thriller
- Created by: Hideyuki Kurata
- Original video animation
- Directed by: Koji Masunari
- Produced by: Masatoshi Fujimoto; Keiichi Matsuda
- Written by: Hideyuki Kurata
- Music by: Taku Iwasaki
- Studio: Studio Deen
- Licensed by: AUS: Madman Entertainment; NA: Aniplex of America; UK: Manga Entertainment
- Released: May 23, 2001 – February 6, 2002
- Runtime: 90 minutes
- Episodes: 3

Read or Die is an OVA based on the characters of the novels and manga of the same name by Hideyuki Kurata. It was released by Studio Deen from 2001 to 2002 and distributed outside Japan by Manga Entertainment in 2003. The series, directed by Koji Masunari, features the main characters of the original manga such as Yomiko Readman and Joker. Despite this, it is not a continuation of either the light novels or the manga storyline. (Note: Hayashi, 2013, p. 113. Kurata: " 'R.O.D' was always intended to be a mixed media project, so each incarnation tells its own separate story, but you are able to gain a deeper understanding of the 'R.O.D' world as a whole by experiencing all of them together.") (Note: This is further supported by the fact that in the final chapter of the manga, Joker's hands are amputated by the Paper Master, Ridley (a character that only exists within the manga canon). Joker acquires prosthetic hands that never make an appearance in either the OVA or TV series. Teenage Nenene meets Wendy and Drake in the third act where they wind up as her personal employees in Japan (the trio are not acquainted before their meeting in the TV series) while Yomiko defects from the Library, travelling on her own.)

The OVA was aired on Adult Swim in October 2004, unedited save for the fact that the three episodes were re-cut into a single film, and later premiered on the SyFy channel Ani-Monday block in 2007. The three segments received a Blu-ray upgrade, along with the 26-episode TV series, R.O.D the TV by Aniplex of America in 2010.

== Story ==
The first episode begins with a cold open set in Washington DC. The action unfolds in medias res as President Cole evacuates the White House, surrounded by his bodyguards. The samurai Gennai Hiraga appears on top of the White House and annihilates it using a mysterious power. Later, it is revealed that the Library of Congress has also been attacked, although this takes place offscreen.

Meanwhile, the story moves to Jinbo-cho, Tokyo. Yomiko Readman, during one of her crazed bookshopping sprees, claims an ultra-rare German first edition book, "die Unsterbliche Liebe" (or "The Undying Love"), which contains handwritten sheet music within its pages. Once outside, she is immediately attacked by a superhuman-like clone of Jean Henri Fabre riding a giant mecha grasshopper. He attempts to steal her book, but she fights back and wins, exhibiting a superhuman ability to manipulate paper. A man in a suit walks up to her moments later, asking "The Paper" to accompany him. We learn that Yomiko is an agent of the British Library Special Operations Division, a spy organization tasked with locating and protecting rare books worldwide.

A field agent team, consisting of Yomiko and American operative/trained mercenary Drake Anderson, is sent to investigate the attack at the Library of Congress. Upon arriving in New York City, Drake and Yomiko meet fellow agent Nancy Makuhari (a.k.a. "Miss Deep"), who also has been sent by Joker to investigate. Yomiko and Nancy are assigned to work together, and various comical moments occur throughout the episodes as personality clashes occur between Nancy's suave, femme fatale character and Yomiko's extreme bibliomaniac, childlike demeanor. During the investigation, the three Library agents foil another attempt to steal the book, this time perpetrated by a clone of Otto Lilienthal.

In London, Joker and the British Library staff uncover evidence that someone has created various super-powered clones (or "I-Jin") of famous historical figures. The I-Jin, led by a clone of Ikkyu Soujun, are trying to steal the sheet music in Yomiko's book to reconstruct Ludwig van Beethoven's supposedly lost "Death Symphony," which causes anyone who hears it to commit suicide. The symphony figures in a plot to eliminate most of humankind, which Ikkyu sees as foolish, selfish and generally unworthy of life.

The Library team discovers that the I-Jin have built a rocket which, when launched, will play the supposed "Death Symphony" over worldwide radio frequencies. A fleet of US Navy ships are ordered to destroy the base located in the middle of the Pacific Ocean, but the warships are sunk by the base's weapons. Nancy is revealed to be a double agent, and escapes to the I-Jin Base. Yomiko becomes bent on finding her despite her betrayal, but she is taken hostage herself by none other than Nancy, revealing that she is an I-Jin clone of Mata Hari. Yomiko is imprisoned in a secret room within the I-Jin base, but when Ikkyu asks her to join the I-Jin, she refuses. Ikkyu reveals his plans to Yomiko, and then seemingly kills Nancy before her eyes. As Yomiko watches in horror, another Nancy steps out of the shadows and kisses Ikkyu passionately. The lovers depart, leaving Yomiko to die in the rapidly flooding room.

As Yomiko struggles to free herself from Ikkyu's trap and Drake battles the I-Jin versions of Fabre and Hiraga, Ikkyu's Nancy is confronted by the Library's Nancy, who survived Ikkyu's attack. The clones fight each other, ending with one Nancy floating faceup in the water at the bottom of the launch platform. The rocket launches with Yomiko, Ikkyu and the surviving Nancy aboard. As Beethoven is about to play the Death Symphony, Ikkyu gloats over his Nancy's defeat of the Library's Nancy, but she suddenly turns on him and kills him. When he dies, she reveals that she was able to pose as her clone by switching her gun from her left hand to her right. Yomiko destroys the strings of the organ as British and American forces seize the I-Jin fortress. Yomiko plans to evacuate them both from the rocket using her book as a parachute, but at the last second Nancy does not jump, preferring to stay behind on the rocket, telling the dead Ikkyu, "You were a cold, heartless bastard... but even you don't deserve to die alone." The OVA ends with Yomiko visiting Nancy's "little sister" in a secure nursing facility run by the Library staff. She has lost most of her memory due to brain damage caused by oxygen deprivation, and asks Yomiko to tell her about her "older sister."

== Characters ==
=== British Library staff ===
Yomiko Readman
Voiced by: Rieko Miura (Japanese); Kimberly Yates (English)
Codenamed "The Paper" (or "Agent Paper" in the English dub), Yomiko Readman is the story's main character working for the British Library's Special Operations Division. She has the super-natural ability to control paper. Outside of the Library she is a substitute schoolteacher. Yomiko is a bibliomaniac with a somewhat meek, childlike demeanor who prefers to retreat into reading wherever she can. She resides in Jinbōchō, Tokyo where she frequently buys tons of books. Despite being half-British, Kimberly Yates does the dub for her in an American accent in the OVA.
Nancy Makuhari
Voiced by: Michiko Neya (Japanese); Amanda Winn Lee (English)
Codenamed "Miss Deep", Nancy also works for the British Library. She is a slick, suave, femme fatale type character (which ends up becoming a personality clash with Yomiko) who has the special ability to pass through solid objects by absorbing herself, hence the codename "Deep". She says that she doesn't like her codename, as it "makes her sound like a porn star". She is actually revealed to be created as the first of the two I-Jin based upon Mata Hari.
Drake Anderson
Voiced by: Masami Iwasaki (Japanese); Jaxon Lee (English)
Drake is an archetypal tough, no-nonsense experienced American soldier. A veteran of the American Special Forces, Drake now works in the Special Operations Division as a field support operative. Drake has a young daughter Maggie (who is not actually seen in the anime) whom he loves very much, and it is reflected upon his soft spot for children.
Joe Carpenter
Voiced by: Hozumi Gōda (Japanese); Crispin Freeman (English)
Joseph Carpenter, also known as "Joker," is the chief director and president of the British Library and its Special Operations Division. He is the boss of Yomiko Readman as well as other agents, including his rather clumsy assistant, Wendy Earhart. He represents a stereotypical posh Englishman and is somewhat calm and collected. Joker actually created the I-Jin program to fulfill a mysterious need not covered in the OVA, however the I-Jin run free out of Joker's control.
Wendy Earhart
Voiced by: Mika Sakenobe (Japanese); Samantha Tabak (English)
Wendy is a young British woman in training to be an agent for Special Operations. She serves as Joker's secretary and personal assistant who retrieves knowledge for him. She is somewhat clumsy but devoted and enthusiastic as well as cares for Yomiko.

=== Historical figures used in the OVA ===
- Gennai Hiraga was the original figure who destroyed the White House and appears multiple times throughout the series. He unleashes a mysterious power in the form of green lightning bolts which is used in the series to cut the entire electricity supply of New York City, disable aircraft and destroy buildings in Washington DC. In the final episode at the I-Jin fortress, Yomiko and Gennai engage in a sword fight, using a paper sword and a lightsaber-type weapon respectively. He dies when Yomiko uses a $100 bill to rupture a liquid nitrogen coolant line, whereupon he is frozen solid and shattered.
- Jean Henri Fabre first appears in the beginning of the first episode, when he attempts to steal the "Immortal Beloved." He rides a giant mechanical grasshopper and can control bees and other insects to use as weapons. Like the insects he studied, juvenile Fabres are shown moulting from one form to another, growing from child to adult in a few days. Two Fabres are shown in the series; the first Fabre apparently dies by crashing into a Tokyo office building, but actually moulted and escaped, taking the form of a child until he fights and is killed by Drake Anderson within the I-Jin base.
- Mata Hari, a First World War spy, is the basis for Nancy Makuhari. When Nancy began to work for the British Library Special Operations, Ikkyu created an exact clone of the Nancy in every way except the fact she uses her left hand. The only surviving I-Jin with no memory of her actions after Nancy nearly killed her, Mata Hari plays a role in the TV series.
- Otto Lilienthal, also known as the "Glider King", appears in the first episode where he snatches Yomiko's book while she is in the Library of Congress. The Library team chases him to New York City, where Yomiko builds a giant paper airplane to engage Lilienthal in aerial combat. Yomiko and Nancy defeat him by attaching a paper grappling hook to his glider, which then crashes into the Statue of Liberty.
- Genjo Sanzo appears in India, where he splits the water in a river to reveal submerged buildings. He wields an extensible staff, breathes fire, and can fly by floating on clouds. During the showdown, he manages to severely wound Nancy, but is defeated when an enraged Yomiko hurls thousands of index cards at him. He survives long enough to give Yomiko's book to Jean-Henri Fabre, but is then killed by Ikkyu Soujun.
- Stephen Wilcox appears in the third episode on the I-Jin fortress, making a minor appearance as the builder of many of the I-Jin machinery, including Otto Lilienthal's Glider, Genjō-sanzō's heart mechanism (never directly stated, but very likely), and the I-Jin Fortress itself, which appears to be steam-powered instead of, or in addition to, nuclear-powered as Joker implies (nuclear power plants use steam heated by a reactor, so they are not mutually exclusive). He is portrayed as being built into the Fortress and visibly insane. He is killed with Jean-Henri Fabre by Drake Anderson.
- Ikkyu Soujun is the leader of the I-Jin, and first appears in the second episode. He is romantically involved with Mata Hari/Nancy; creating a clone of her to serve as a spy to pose as her within the British Library's special operations team. He dies at the hands of Nancy aboard the rocket at the end of the series.
- Ludwig van Beethoven appears in the final episode, when he is sent off in Ikkyu's rocket to play his "Death Symphony" at an altitude where it can be heard worldwide. His fate is unknown after Yomiko cuts the strings of the organ, but it is assumed he dies in the crash of the rocket.

== Production ==
SME Visual Works (now Sony Music Entertainment Japan) first approached writer Hideyuki Kurata in 1998 to create an OVA, specifically "a 'female spy story'." Before a solid concept took off, Kurata had proposed to center his film on a male protagonist, Hiraga Gennai where he would utilize "electricity as a weapon," and then, a mysterious power involving a "paper user will defeat him." However, his idea was promptly rejected by SME, thinking it would be best to shelve the project. However, Kurata caved, going back to the original proposal: "[We will] feature a female [as our hero]." That said, he would go on to recycle the plot featuring Hiraga in Episode 1. Additionally, he utilized the energy he had leftover "from his ragged thoughts" when he worked on his anime teleplay adaptation of the manga series, Excel Saga.

Kurata has cited the manga Ushio & Tora as a major inspiration for building the action sequences in the early developmental stages. He was partial to the idea of an action anime considering his interest for action films. However, "[t]here were a lot of sports-oriented action scenes [in those movies], such as kicking." Consequently, he was keen to make his action scenes based in human emotions. He was further influenced by the numerous literary styles of authors he had read throughout the years, thinking his protagonist would be a quiet type, "a [woman] of prayer." Somehow, he envisioned the setting that would be most appropriate for his character to be a British atmosphere, directly inspired by the James Bond franchise. "When books are involved in the UK," Kurata commented, "it is inevitable that [it would be] the British Library (although, the setting for his fictional spy organization that was loosely drawn from the real library in question would wind up being located underground the old reading room, the King's Library in the East Wing of the British Museum). (Note: R.O.D Official Archive, p. 124. "The King's Library, built on the ground floor of the British Museum's East Wing, was not fully open to the general public until 1857. The 'British Library' as we know it today was created in 1973 as a result of the British Library Act 1972.") He further explored in an interview with the American anime magazine, Anime Insider in 2004 the idea "if it were possible to do an action anime with a more literary, a more scholarly atmosphere, unlike a typical physical action story."

Once he came up with the central idea for a character, "a woman who loved books" and "would scatter paper everywhere," he drew from historical figures to fill the roles of her main antagonists. While Kurata initially planned to use such figures as Thomas Edison and the Wright Brothers, he was forced to abandon this idea when he realized "American historical figures tend to be protected by things like portrait rights." To avoid lawsuits, he revised his premise to include German historical figures as an alternative (however, one of his earliest drafts teased the inclusion of Cleopatra, Sir Isaac Newton, Leonardo da Vinci and Goethe) and submitted his pitch to SME, which was immediately green-lit. Koji Masunari was brought on board as director while Taraku Uon and Masashi Ishihama were hired as the character designers (Ishihama would also act as chief animation director). Kurata personally selected Uon as he had praised his artwork: "Many of Uon's women have a glamorous feel to them." Similarly, he asked Ishihama to join his team at Studio Deen after seeing his work in the 1999 OVA, Tenamonya Voyagers. "I was a fan before we met," Kurata said, adding with humor, "I then found out he was a weirdo and his drawings were plain." Artist Hiroko Kazui was added as a key animator where her co-workers have complimented the "cute illustrations" she submitted for Episode 1. For instance, she was responsible for the final cut with Yomiko and Nancy sitting on top of the Statue of Liberty, her character work representing Yomiko hesitantly poking Nancy's finger before being pulled up by Nancy, an early example of their bond. "That was [a] really cute [moment]," Kurata gushed. "Nancy was very cute overall."

Production was well underway when SME suggested that the creative team release a light novel series "to attract a wide audience" for the OVA release. Through SME's partnerships with the publishing companies, Shueisha and Super Dash Bunko, they hired Kurata to pen a novel series before the OVA was set to be released. Although, Kurata has also contradicted these details: "A novel had always been part of the master plan."

Kurata's friend, Yōsuke Kuroda, writer of the Onegai Teacher and Onegai Twins franchise and the owner of Studio Orphee, encouraged him to start with "a novel to act as the original work [for the anime]," which Kurata agreed to do. The workload was split between Kuroda (who offered to write the OVA episodes), Kurata (who worked on the manuscripts for both a novel and manga series) and Uon (who designed the rough drafts of the characters as Kurata fleshed out his concepts).

Uon was initially unaware of the genre chosen for the series (a spy thriller); his designs used City Hunter (a detective romance franchise) as a mood board, therefore the characters were drawn in a hard-boiled detective style before he was asked to change it. After it was made known that he was working on "a pretty serious spy story," he referenced the OVA Agent Aika. "[He created] a line of adult women exuding sex appeal and holding a gun," Kurata observed of Uon's art. "It was like [seeing] someone get shot at [for real]." Uon compared these new sets of drawings to "gekiga."

"She had a manga-like feel in the rough draft [for the novels and later, the anime version]," Uon explained in a few interviews with PALETTA Magazine. "In the early planning stages, Yomiko looked 'sharp,' like another certain agent, 007. Her clothes too had a tighter fit. Around that time, Kurata-san told me to make [her look] more modest. So she became a laid back character," implementing actress Miki Nakatani as a model via Kurata's suggestion since during this period, he was following the 1999 TV drama, Keizoku, starring Nakatani. It was also decided that Yomiko would be a bedhead, "the kind of woman who doesn't fix her hair," mirroring Nakatani's disheveled appearance as her character, Jun Shibata in the former title.

Kurata continued: "It felt like Yomiko's personality was solidified at that stage: 'I read books while dragging my cart. My room is a total mess, full of books. I have bad sleeping habits...' We started by creating it little by little." Unon proposed that Yomiko's "private life [should be the] selling point!"

"But it seems that something went wrong here," Unon added. "Apparently, she never takes off her glasses, even when she's sleeping!" However, Uon swung the opposite way in other aspects, like increasing her chest size opposed to decreasing it. "The one [who actually gave Yomiko] big breasts," he answered when pressed by Kurata, "is Kuroda." Ishihama would confess that her breasts had been prominently sized from the beginning, "even in the rough sketch [by Uon]." The objective for Yomiko's finalized version took into consideration "round and plump" as well as "spacey."

As animation director (plus, secondary character designer), Ishihama was tasked with the redesigns, which he found challenging. "I was just a newbie designer at the time," he said. "I had to figure out how to draw Uon's art my way;" Uon was an artist he greatly respected. Ishihama would later recall how difficult he found it to stay true to Uon's original sketches while adding his own flare to the characters and learned to draw Uon's style by tracing over his line work. "[In my versions] the number of lines [in Uon's drawings] had been reduced dramatically and it had become simpler," said Ishihama. Kurata mentioned that Ishihama's Yomiko was simplistic compared to her rough drafts, "yet [still] nuanced." Shutaro Yamada, the artist of the R.O.D manga, faced similar dilemmas when working off Uon's sketches as a blueprint. "Drake was really hard to draw," he admitted. "Uon's rough draft of Drake looked older than [another artist's] version [at Studio Deen]." Although Kuroda never received a character design credit, Uon would name the former as the creator of the key design elements that he took inspiration from, especially of Yomiko's distinct hairstyle (i.e. her parted bangs) and wardrobe (i.e. her white coat and suitcase). The coat was an important feature, Unon underscored, because while Yomiko carried around her case, her wardrobe functioned mainly as a convenient way for her to retrieve her paper from the inside pockets at a moment's notice. Later, Kuroda would exit the project due to other commitments.

Kurata embedded parts of himself into his heroine that would further influence the art design - notably her glasses (identical to his own; he has denied this in interviews, yet his staff and fans have insisted otherwise) (Note: Anime Insider, 2004. Kurata: "I think [my glasses are] slightly different.") and her Jinbōchō, Tokyo apartment, which was modeled from the "Kurata castle," his private home which was "jammed full of books, a veritable warehouse" that served as an unofficial office space for frequent staff meetings with Studio Deen and later, J.C. Staff. Ran Ayanaga, illustrator of the Read or Dream manga spinoff and one of the original character designers of the anime sequel, R.O.D the TV likened Kurata's apartment to "those used bookstores in Kanda."

When it came to Wendy's final designs and mannerisms, Kurata looked to several outside works of media, not least manga and novels, to develop her personality for the artists to expand upon. Namely, the work of Hisaichi Ishii's manga had a large influence on Wendy, principally her clumsy office girl archetype, and her dark skin tone was loosely derived from the mixed-heritage of the main character in Perīnu Monogatari, a Nippon Animation adaptation of Hector Malot's novel, Nobody's Girl. Non-canonically, Kurata has revealed that Wendy is, in fact, Anglo-Indian in origin, which was vaguely alluded to previously in Uon's artist commentary published in a 2003 volume of PALETTA Magazine to promote the TV series sequel (to clarify, he had only mentioned that she was "blond-haired, half blood"). "The [first drawing] I received [of Wendy from the animators] was unexpectedly cute," said Kurata, inventing her for the OVA when he realised that Joker needed a staff member to work alongside him. At this point, Wendy was featured with two possibilities of appearance: a stringy fringe held back by an Alice band and a long middle parting with a plaited ponytail tied with a ribbon (the only similarities that these sketches shared was her British Library uniform with World War I-era detachable sleeves - or half-sleeves, and that she wore her hair down to her waist compared to her final version). "When the tension in Read was getting high," added Kurata, "I thought she was the kind of character who would break things down. [...] [And] she was so cute that Director Masunari said, 'Let's make this kid a regular'." It was only then that Kurata decided to introduce Wendy in Episode 2 and have her become a recurring supporting role in Volume 1 (and all subsequent installments) of the lights novels. "[She] always follow[s] through [Joker's orders]," Kurata went on, a working relationship which was detailed further in the novels. "Otherwise, that kind of organization [at the British Library] would have been so [disastrous]. [For her, it's like:] 'I guess I'll just have to [clean things] up.'"

As for Nancy, Uon toyed around with various ideas and physical attributes - cropped pixie, square bob cut, bangs, side part, oval-shaped glasses, even a field agent costume that was perhaps more revealing of her cleavage - all with the goal that she had to be a complete "contrasting character to Yomiko." Uon commented: "[I] also considered her as a blonde beauty," which was ultimately scrapped for her signature darker shade. In his sketches for the male cast, Uon had entertained the concept that Drake would dress more modest (in a button-down instead of casual army gear or a vest), though his shaggy mane, which was shorter in the back at first but would transform into a short ponytail, would be transferred over to the final version. Joker still wore his hair aggressively slicked back, though the ends were kept longer - nearly shoulder-length - and his choice in wardrobe featured a roll-neck jumper opposed to a suit or his British Library uniform. He also happened to be more expressive, to which Uon noted: "[His] design is a little wild." At the outset, it was planned that a character who was heavily prominent in Kurata's manuscript of the first light novel and an important asset to the British Library's staff, Jiggy Stardust would be written into the OVA. Uon had gone out of his way to submit the character's rough designs, only to learn that "due to time constraints," Jiggy was eventually axed.

Kurata has stated that he worked on the series backwards: he started with a draft of the second novel since the first novel "wasn't coming together" and from there, once he discovered who his characters were, he asked Kuroda if he could take over as screenwriter for the OVA as he had grown attached to them (the latter agreed). The first R.O.D light novel, illustrated by Taraku Uon, was published in 2000, introducing Yomiko Readman, Nenene Sumiergawa and the core cast of the British Library while the first volume of the R.O.D manga was released the same year, illustrated by Shutaro Yamada, in order to promote the OVA. When the manga finished its initial serialization in Shōnen Ultra Jump magazine, the first OVA disc hit shelves. Both works of literature (the books and comics) borrowed ideas from one another, such as Yomiko moonlighting as a field agent for Joker and her first meeting with Nenene (only featured in the novels and manga and never onscreen in the OVA) as a high school substitute teacher, though were treated as separate entities, featuring the same characters but following a different story arc and canon. Likewise, only the anime - the OVA and TV series - were created as direct continuations of each other. Kurata explained: "'R.O.D was always intended to be a mixed media project, so each incarnation tells its own separate story, but you are able to gain a deeper understanding of the 'R.O.D' world as a whole by experiencing all of them together."

While Kurata would later acknowledge the popularity of Yomiko in Japan, he disclosed that in his rough drafts, he had intended for the novels and manga to star Yomiko's boyfriend, Donnie, (Note: R.O.D Official Archive, pp. 88-89. Donnie, a major supporting character in the R.O.D manga and novels, is only ever alluded to in the anime version, particularly in R.O.D the TV, Episode 17: "Sweet Home" and Episode 18: "Confessions." As printed: "... the man on the right was Yomiko's mentor and lover, Donny Nakajima [alternate spelling]. Donny's name is also mentioned in the 'R.O.D' novel. [...] According to Joker, he died but was resurrected under unusual circumstances.") a field agent and spy for the British Library who just so happened to be book obsessed (and, unsurprisingly, a Paper Master). "Most people who are like [geeks] are men," thought Kurata, "but so are some women. Thus: [this was] the birth of the animated version of Yomiko."

It took up to two and a half years to complete all three episodes. On a monthly basis, the staff would hang out at coffee shops to discuss the production's progress and exchange ideas, later graduating to once-a-month-four-hour phone meetings. "We were constantly going over tiny points," said Kurata; it was not unusual for him to tweak a line of dialogue as a last ditch effort or even rearrange an entire deadline schedule. He was then invited to a studio meeting late in the final stages to watch the dubbing sessions for Episode 3. "My jaw hangs wider each time I see the mind-numbingly high-quality artwork," he was quoted. At the time, it was one of the most expensive OVAs produced.

== Release ==
To promote the OVA, which hadn't yet been shown overseas in the United States, Anime Expo invited writer Hideyuki Kurata, director Koji Masunari and character designer/animation director Masashi Ishihama as special guests for an exclusive production team panel, which was held in Long Beach, California in July 2002. The creators explained that while their series is populated by supernatural elements, it essentially depicts "a 'normal' world, perhaps only one or two years [prior to 2002]." Kurata cited that as an example, "in the original novels, (Stephen King) makes a brief appearance." To date, there have not been plans for the novels to be translated for an international audience, though Kurata noted he would be interested. He had, however, teased plans for the TV series sequel which may have been set in China.

The series finally premiered in the U.S. at such events as the Los Angeles Anime Festival in spring 2003.

Ishihama would remember fondly in his art book commemorating his portfolio that his work on R.O.D was a pivotal "turning point" in his career as it was the first time he had been hired in the position of animation director. "[R.O.D gave me] a strong sense of responsibility in making animation," he was quoted, voicing his appreciation of the positive feedback he received from fans over the years. "I felt like I was being rewarded for doing something, and that the more I did it, the more I was evaluated. I think that was the case [when I attended the] American Anime Expo. It's great to be so close to your fans." Based on the positive coverage the OVA received in various anime magazines, Kurata and the creative team had planned to re-edit the OVA as a feature film with the addition of newly animated content. This proposal was later scrapped and instead, the creators would go on to create a sequel in the form of a TV series.

== TV series ==
The story of the OVA was immediately followed in the 26-episode TV series R.O.D the TV where Kurata decided to start with a "fresh set of characters."

The TV series is loosely connected to the OVA since it follows the Three Sisters and Nenene (of the light novels and manga) instead of Yomiko, though it is revealed that events are directly continued from the preceding anime in Episode 14. (Note: Animage, March 2004. "As the story progresses, the reality of the sisters' origin is revealed by Joker. It becomes clear that Anita's hidden past goes deeper. The world of 'ROD THE TV!' is interpreted. The flames in Anita's memory are due to Yomiko. Overcoming the truth, the three sisters continue to fight! This month, we will explain in detail the link with the OVA version. The three sisters who were living in Japan were suddenly surrounded by the British Library, who were involved in a worldwide siege.") The series takes place five years after the OVA, and within this time, Yomiko has disappeared. Meanwhile, her friend and former student Nenene Sumiregawa has been searching for her. (Nenene was featured off-screen in the OVA through post-it notes in Yomoko's apartment.) (Note: R.O.D Official Archive, p. 71. "It could be said that Nenene made an appearance in the OVA through the numerous notes she left in Yomiko's room.") Yomiko, Drake, Joker and Wendy all appear in the TV series, however, most of them change significantly in either appearance or character. For instance, Joker displays signs of aging while Wendy is more mature and serious.

One notable difference in the TV English dub is that Yomiko is voiced by Hellena Taylor, an English actress, whereas Kimberly Yates, an American, provided her voice in the OVA. Thus, she adopts an authentic British accent. She also develops a slightly more sensible character.

In the guide book, R.O.D Official Archive published in Japan in 2010 (translated in English in 2012), it was established that although the OVA does not share a "direct correlation" with the original light novels or manga as Kurata considers all R.O.D properties to be independent of one another, many of the elements from the novels and manga were adapted into the OVA and TV series. Specifically, the first novel provides background on Yomiko and Nenene's relationship, and the OVA serves as the setup for the series. (Note: R.O.D Official Archive, p. 71. "... the various media loosely [interacts] with one another to expand on the 'R.O.D' world... [K]ey elements, such as Mr. Gentleman's desire to achieve immortality, were preserved in the animes [sic] that followed.") Further comments have mentioned that the "unusual nature" of the OVA's opening credits featuring a psychedelic spy aesthetic was re-adapted for the television series.

== Reception ==
=== Critical response ===
The OVA was well-received by the American publication, Anime Insider, writing that "[the] plot [...] barely scrapes the surface of the sheer awe 'Read or Die' inspires in its viewers," identifying that although the story could be "goofy" at times, the anime as a whole was "a masterful example of everything great about anime. It takes its bizarre but superbly well-planned premise and executes it with gleeful perfection." They further expressed that the animation was "astounding [and] the level of detail is staggering (check out the neo-Victorian [sic] cell phone used by the Library!)."

Animation World Network lauded the production, writing: "Full of exotic backgrounds, high-quality 2D/3D animation by Studio Deen (it reportedly was the highest-budgeted 90-minute OAV production to that time), spectacular action sequences in the James Bond tradition, attractive character designs, famous names and the best pseudo-James Bond movie score you ever heard (by Taku Iwasaki), R.O.D. has won top praise from almost every reviewer." It was further named "a highly tongue-in-cheek pastiche of action-based fantasy/sci-fi big-budget live-action (but heavily CGI) movies" which boasted an "awfully sweet and convincingly spunky" heroine.

Eve McLachlan of CBR praised the OVA for not letting down book lovers and highlighted the heroine, Yomiko Readman for proving that "the pen really is mightier than the sword." The same publication later commended the series' handling of supernatural elements, writing: "Papermasters had one of the most unique anime powers" with the original ability to "telekinetically control paper and shape it into whatever form they wanted," although it was also noted that such powers presented consequences. "Yomiko's [book] addiction made it impossible for her to function in everyday life, and she would've died were it not for British Intelligence's help."

Charles Webb of MTV argued that the OVA was a "pretty action-packed affair" and had an obviously different tone than R.O.D the TV. Theron Martin of Anime News Network had similar sentiments, noting that the OVA episodes spun a "high-spirited adventure yarn focused on super-powered fights" while singling out the superhero abilities of Yomiko Readman. He further praised the visual and technical aspects, emphasizing the change in tone compared to R.O.D the TV; however, he criticized the "hokey plot and premise".

Matt Lopez of Animerica gave the OVA an "A", naming the work as "unmistakably sweet in the way a kick-butt action series is sweet," noting the devoted fan following the anime had earned, and argued that the premise was simple as a "classic superhero-vs.-bad guy story." He added that the OVA series presented a developed plot, having everything from "in-your-face action to dramatic backstabs and tragedy," elaborating that the series didn't take a "big commitment to watch, just a few hours."

Screen Rant has described the work as "[a] blend of spy intrigue, historical fantasy, and superpowered [sic] spectacle," adding that it "offers a unique premise and stunning animation" that combined "quirky humor and explosive action," supplementing the work as a "cult hit." The world building has also been applauded: "[The] British Library Special Operations Division is one of the more unique anime spy organizations" given that the U.K.'s national security is not its main agenda, "but rather [...] preserving the 'glory and wisdom' of Britain by taking down those who would damage [the Empire's status] by stealing or destroying books," which ultimately, places the Library as "the global protector of knowledge." Jason S. Yadao of the Hawaiian newspaper, Honolulu Star-Bulletin was under the impression that the OVA may have been considered a "typical covert-agency-versus-tyrannical-cabal fare, complete with betrayals of trust and explosions aplenty," yet the action and "layers of intrigue" offered by the narrative avoided common clichés, keeping the viewers engaged in the story's multiple twists and turns.

In his book, Interpreting Anime Christopher Bolton has argued that "the theme [...] turns out to be the peril of becoming too obsessed with art and literature," explaining that Yomiko's "unhealthy preoccupation" with books is represented as such as it "cuts her off from reality," leaving her to seek meaningful relationships through fiction opposed to actual people — that is, until "her gradual realization" which proves otherwise. "In this context," he elaborated, "it is no accident that this anime's villains emerge largely from the world of literature and art, which is seen as a threat." He cited the plot device of Beethoven's symphony as an example of this, where the power of his "doomsday device" can result in "its listeners to turn away from real life," ultimately committing suicide. He also interpreted Yomiko wearing glasses as not only a visual representation of her bookish side, though as a guard against her lack of social skills and emotional intelligence, that is, until she allows herself to open herself up to Nancy, an interaction "which ambiguously combines [...] sisterly affection" with lesbian attraction. However, he glossed over the revelation that her glasses once belonged to her deceased lover, which can explain her atypical reaction when Nancy reaches out to touch them; Bolton had read her behavior as being "a kind of shield [for her] intimate self and the people around her," with no mention made to Donnie's presence behind the object.

Bolton further analyzed the intro, key visuals which were "specifically [designed] for the credits," acknowledging their unique function outside of simply being an intro to set the tone because story-wise, "they contain motifs that shed light on the anime as a whole." He interpreted the recurring symbolism, specifically of reflective surfaces (i.e. cityscapes, Yomiko's glasses, Joker's watch, etc.), to mean "a ready metaphor for the critical idea that language or media that seem[s] to be 'transparent' [...] [in reality] distort[s] that view;" the so-named faithful perception is, in fact, false, he argued. He dissected the sequence of Nancy shooting through the glass of her reflection, framed within her point of view, as a literal depiction of a faithful transmission "of whatever lies on the other side" of the glass to actually be a distortion; when she shatters the glass, she unveils "a figure inside the room, silhouetted but still vaguely familiar." On a critical note, the love of reading "is not portrayed [...] convincingly," he added, in spite of the number of literary references to prominent figures. Books "exist more as physical objects than as literary or textual ones," thus, Bolton stated, the series never digs deeper into the potential for intertexuality, failing to build upon the "nested narratives" of its references. "And yet," he concluded, "it does have this metatextual layer, one that encourages the viewer to see him- or herself in Yomiko."

=== Awards and nominations ===
Year	Award	Category	Recipient	Result	Ref.
2002	The Society for the Promotion of Japanese Animation (Anime Expo 2002)	Best Original Video Animation	Hideyuki Kurata, Koji Masunari and Masashi Ishihama	Won	
2003	Anime Dub Recognition (ADR) Awards	Actress of the Month (May)	Kimberly Yates	Won	
