= R.O.D the TV =

Japanese anime television series

- Key visual, featuring (from front to back) Anita King, Nenene Sumiregawa, Michelle Cheung, and Maggie Mui
- Genre: Action, mystery
- Created by: Hideyuki Kurata
- Anime television series
- Directed by: Koji Masunari
- Produced by: Koji Masunari; Tomonori Ochikoshi
- Written by: Hideyuki Kurata
- Music by: Taku Iwasaki
- Studio: J.C.Staff
- Licensed by: AUS: Madman Entertainment; NA: Aniplex of America; UK: MVM Films
- Original network: Fuji TV
- English network: CA: G4techTV (Anime Current); SEA: Animax Asia; US: G4 (Anime Unleashed); ZA: Animax
- Original run: October 1, 2003 – March 16, 2004
- Episodes: 26

R.O.D the TV is a Japanese anime television series, animated by J.C.Staff and produced by Aniplex, directed by Koji Masunari and scripted by Hideyuki Kurata. It follows the adventures of three paper-manipulating sisters, Michelle, Maggie and Anita who become the bodyguards of Nenene Sumiregawa, a famous Japanese writer. Featuring music by Taku Iwasaki, the series is a sequel to the Read or Die OVA. (Note: Review, Vol. 7 UK, 2007: "[W]hile initially the two stories seem separate and can be enjoyed that way, from practically the first frame, the TV series makes visual and narrative reference to the OVA, and as the story progresses, the two become more and more intertwined. These aspects didn't stand out for me the first time [around], but having watched the OVA first this time, I found there was extra enjoyment to be had from the TV series.") Its official title of R.O.D the TV is a catch-all acronym referring to the inclusion of characters from both Read or Die (the light novels, manga and OVA) and the Read or Dream manga, the latter of which revolves solely around the Paper Sisters (except, Yomiko Readman does make a cameo appearance in the last chapter; the manga is not considered canon to the TV storyline). (Note: Hayashi, 2013, p. 71. "... the various media loosely [interacts] with one another to expand on the 'R.O.D' world...") (Note: Hayashi, 2013, p. 113. Kurata: " 'R.O.D' was always intended to be a mixed media project, so each incarnation tells its own separate story, but you are able to gain a deeper understanding of the 'R.O.D' world as a whole by experiencing all of them together.") Promotional material for R.O.D the TV implies that the show centers around the three sisters of Read or Dream; however, Nenene Sumiregawa of Read or Die is also considered a protagonist.

R.O.D the TV was broadcast for 26 episodes from October 1, 2003, to March 16, 2004, on pay-per-view satellite television platform SKY PerfecTV!. It also aired across the terrestrial Fuji Television station from October 15, 2003, to March 18, 2004. It was also broadcast worldwide by the anime satellite television network, Animax.

The series was first distributed on DVD in North America by Geneon, in seven discs; the company finished releasing the series in summer 2005. Aniplex of America re-released the original Read or Die episodes and the TV series on Blu-ray in Winter 2010/2011.

== Plot ==
Set in 2006 five years after the events in Read or Die, Nenene Sumiregawa, a renowned author in Japan who was a publishing prodigy at 13-years-old, is invited to a promotional book signing in Hong Kong. However, Nenene's career has been at a standstill: she has neither written nor published a single novel since her former high school teacher and best friend, Yomiko Readman has mysteriously vanished. Unable to cope with the loss of her friend, she has slipped into an aggressive state of writer's block.

While in Hong Kong, she runs into a quirky sister trio, Michelle, Maggie and Anita, the older sisters having been appointed as guides and translators (and later, protectors). When Nenene's hotel room is threatened with a planted bomb by an insecure local writer, she is invited into the sisters' cramped apartment, filled floor-to-ceiling with books. Despite the previous day's events, Nenene attends the scheduled book signing, accompanied by the sisters. Things turn drastic when the terrorist writer appears with another bomb disguised as a pen, venting his fury that his book has been rejected while Hong Kong celebrates a foreign writer. The three sisters come to her rescue, revealing themselves to be Paper Masters, bibliophiles (excluding Anita) with paper manipulation abilities similar to Yomiko (although less powerful in the case of Michelle and Anita and more focused in scope). (Note: Hayashi, 2013, p. 40: Yomiko "... is proficient in various forms of paper manipulation, including melee combat with paper weapons and the construction of large paper airplanes.") (Note: Hayashi, 2013, p. 42: "Anita is an effective foot soldier in battle.") (Note: Anime Insider, 2004, p. 47: "[A]s the quickest and most athletic, [Anita is] the team's offensive point-main.") (Note: Hayashi, 2013, p. 45: "Michelle offers support fire from the rear during combat. Her younger sisters do exceed her in purely offensive ability.") (Note: Anime Insider, 2004, p. 47: "[Michelle] is a perfect shot with her paper bow and arrows.") (Note: Hayashi, 2013, p. 48: "Maggie's paper skills involve the construction and manipulation of various familiars.") (Note: Anime Insider, 2004, p. 47: "[Maggie] has the strongest powers, and the most variety of techniques.") Once safe, Nenene returns to Tokyo, tailed by the Paper Sisters who are now her bodyguards.

After the initial action-filled adventure, the first several episodes switch tone, becoming a slice-of-life-odd-couple comedy, focusing on tensions between Nenene and the sisters who move into her apartment and mooch off her, all while dealing with various psychos in their everyday lives. The sisters also perform odd jobs as agents of Dokusensha (ostensibly, part Chinese publishing company, part organization with the purpose of collecting rare and powerful documents). This eventually puts them and Nenene in direct conflict with the British Library and the protagonists of Read or Die (Note: Anime Insider, 2004, p. 46: "From: Wendy Earhart (Wearhart@royallibrary.uk.gov): 'We are currently tracking three civilians, who are known as the Three Sisters Detective Agency in Hong Kong'.") (Dokusensha is established as the British Library's rival in the Read or Die novels and manga).

Events grow more serious as the series progresses. Atrocities are committed by both sides, thrusting the main characters into the middle of a conflict between the literary superpowers of the British Library and Dokusensha, sharing the goal to control the entire world and even rewrite history. After a horrific collision with Dokusensha where the sisters defect as agents and are framed as terrorists, Nenene and the Paper Sisters set out to find the missing Yomiko.

When Mr. Lee, Nenene's editor who secretly worked for Dokusensha is killed, he leaves behind a clue hidden in a cigarette lighter, notes which reveal Dokusensha's motives and a missing book that the British Library has been searching for, which may have something to do with Yomiko's disappearance. The girls arrive at the National Diet Library, hoping to find Yomiko and uncover the truth. Thus, our heroes are accidentally plunged into the British Library's path to world domination, which is linked to both Yomiko and a young boy who Anita befriends, Junior. In order to save the world from literary terrorism, the girls must face ultimate risks that may threaten their sisterhood.

== Characters ==
=== Main characters ===
The Paper Sisters names were derived from those of three real Hong Kong action stars: Maggie Cheung, Anita Mui, and Michelle Yeoh (who has also been credited as "Michelle Khan"). These three actresses starred together in the 1993 movie The Heroic Trio as the titular super-powered heroines. Alternatively, a possible reference is Hong Kong actress Michelle Reis, whose surname means "king" in Portuguese (her father being Portuguese).

Anita King (アニタ・キング, Anita Kingu)
Voiced by: Chiwa Saito (Japanese); Rachel Hirschfeld (English)
The youngest sister is a spitfire who specializes in using her paper offensively (by using paper "blades" and throwing index cards like shuriken), but she also relies upon her impressive physical martial arts skills in combat. Unlike all other known Paper Masters, she dislikes books (but is obsessed with collecting frogs and drinking milk). Although Anita sometimes acts bratty and self-important, she deeply loves her sisters. She frequently fights with Nenene, who is equally outspoken, but beneath their squabbles, they demonstrate a strong bond through the series. She is well liked in her class and is especially admired by classmate named Hisami Hishiishi (whom Anita nicknames "Hisa"). Hisa compares the two to the main characters with an extremely close friendship in Anne of Green Gables. Like Maggie, she is also flat chested but unlike the latter, she mostly resembles an elementary school student (especially in stature). At the start of the series, her past is shrouded in mystery and one of her earliest memories involves a traumatic fire incident.
Maggie Mui (マギー・ムイ, Magī Mui) a.k.a. Ma-nee
Voiced by: Hiromi Hirata (Japanese); Sara Lahti (English)
A tall, boyish, quiet wallflower with somewhat depressed looks, her power usually manifests as familiars – beings she controls made of paper; her sisters also rely on her for her strong defensive capabilities. She is known for being easily embarrassed and enjoying tight cosy spots to relax in (which is why she sleeps in the closet). Michelle says her favourite author is Ernest Hemingway, but Maggie quickly points out that she likes Nenene's works too. She strongly looks up to her older sister, Michelle, and compares herself negatively to her. She cares for her sisters and always tries to protect them at the expense of her own safety. Anita believes Maggie to be strongest Paper Sister in combat. Because of her masculine appearance; including her flat chest, she strongly resembles a teenage boy. Before she was adopted as Michelle and Anita's sister, she was seen working as a solitary agent for Dokusensha.
Michelle Cheung (ミシェール ・チャン, Mishēru Chan) a.k.a. Mi-nee (Note: Her surname is sometimes spelled "Chan", the transliteration of the kana spelling her name, but scenes in the series show her name romanized as "Cheung".)
Voiced by: Shoko Kikuchi (Japanese); Hunter MacKenzie Austin (English)
The oldest sister, generally considered the leader and strategist of the three. She has a cheerful, apparently ditzy personality and has been described as having "a warm and gentle attitude." Her favourite books are the Harry Potter series, and she has a soft spot for cute things and small children. She is almost supernaturally calm, and her enemies find it difficult to manipulate her emotions; their enemy Webber notes her emotional balance makes her resistant to his sonic tortures. Michelle manifests her paper powers primarily through ranged weapons, such as bows and arrows. Michelle's love of books almost matches that of Yomiko's; when she arrives in Japan, Michelle buys out so many book stores that people begin to speculate Yomiko has returned.
Nenene Sumiregawa (菫川ねねね, Sumiregawa Nenene) a.k.a. Sensei, Nene-nee-san
Voiced by: Satsuki Yukino (Japanese); Samantha Tabak (English)
A prodigy novelist in her high school years, usually referred to as sensei and originally featured in the Read or Die manga as a teenage friend of the older Yomiko. She is often frustrated with Yomiko's obsession with books – and later the Paper Sisters when they move into her home – and chides her for being absentminded, leaving post-its in her room. Since Yomiko's disappearance, she has become very self-sufficient but unfortunately wistful, cranky and bitter at times in her loneliness. She remained in Japan, despite her parents' move to the United States, in order to housekeep and tend to Yomiko's personal effects until her (presumed) return.

=== Characters from Read or Die ===
Yomiko Readman (読子・リードマン, Yomiko Rīdoman)
Voiced by: Rieko Miura (Japanese); Hellena Taylor (English)
The former "Agent Paper" of the British Library, and Nenene's close friend, does not appear until episode 15 of the series, with only the vague suggestion before she appears of something terrible happening to her around the same time the British Library was destroyed. Yomiko's abilities and power as a papermaster are far greater than those of the Paper Sisters, as she does not seem as limited to one form of use for her powers, whereas Anita, Maggie and Michelle all have one speciality.
Nancy Makuhari (ナンシー・幕張, Nanshī Makuhari)
Voiced by: Michiko Neya (Japanese); Carrie Savage (English)
She is the second I-Jin clone of Mata Hari that Yomiko met in the R.O.D OVA. At the end of the original series, Nancy suffered extensive brain damage as a result of oxygen deprivation; the result was that her mental state was reduced to that of a child, with no memories of her earlier actions. Desperate to protect her, Yomiko took Nancy and ran off into hiding. When introduced in the TV series, Nancy's personality is that of a young girl, far from the femme fatale she was before she was injured.
Drake Anderson (ドレイク・アンダーソン, Doreiku Andāson)
Voiced by: Masami Iwasaki (Japanese); Lee Everest (English)
An American munitions expert, frequently hired by the British Library for mercenary work. Anderson has no superpowers, but is well trained and good with weapons. A weapon of sorts he wields is his knowledge of papermasters, being more knowledgeable than most when pitted against them. He is a sarcastic realist who tries to keep situations calm and professional, although sometimes he is overwhelmed by the eccentric, super-human people around him. He has a young daughter named Maggie, but with no relation to the aforementioned papermaster. Probably because of his daughter, he is less ruthless than a soldier like him would otherwise be (i.e., when he fights the three sisters he does not try to murder them, and he refuses to kill children, such as Anita).
Joseph Carpenter a.k.a. Joker (ジョーカー, Jōkā)
Voiced by: Hozumi Goda (Japanese); JB Blanc (English)
The head of the British Library Special Operations Unit and Yomiko's former boss. He took control of the organization after the death of the Gentleman and is now often referred to as "Mr. Carpenter." Compared to his appearance in the OVA, his face seems a bit more lined from stress (and possibly age), and he now walks with the assistance of a cane. Initially, Joker appears as calm, reassuring, and easy-going as ever, but as the series progresses he gets more violent and high-strung, revealed to be an elitist who holds the same "human selection" principles as the I-Jin (the villains of the OVA). Disappointed by the decline of British global influence following the Gentleman's death, Joker implements a scheme to regain control of the world, no matter the human cost. At the end of the TV Series, he is seen recovering from a comatose state after being "force-fed" part of Mr. Gentleman's information during the execution of Operation Sleeping Books.
Wendy Earhart (ウェンディ・イアハート, Wendi Iahāto)
Voiced by: Mika Sakenobe (Japanese); Siobhan Flynn (English)
Seen in the manga and OVA as Joker's office secretary and junior agent of British Library Special Operations, she now serves as his right hand henchwoman. Wendy's character has matured radically, from an enthusiastic, if clumsy, over-eager young assistant into a serious, ruthless agent willing to fulfil the British Library's plans by any means necessary. She is highly resentful of Yomiko (whereas she adored her in the OVA and manga), likely due to events laid out through the course of the TV series, and she is one of the few British Library personnel fully aware of Joker's plans.
Mr. Gentleman (ジェントルマン, Jentoruman)
Seen in the OVA, now deceased. He was the head of the British Library and the true source of Britain's secret power over global affairs (i.e., it was because of Gentleman that Joker had the authority over the U.S. President in the OVA). In the TV series, the British Library made efforts to revive him with the purpose of reviving the British Empire. Operation Sleeping Books was launched as a last resort, where the British Library used the concept of "Skin Print" to record his human genome into paper and separated it into 7 books. Once an appropriate body/host was found, these books would have been transmitted to the host so that Gentleman may be reborn in a new body. The seven books are:
1. The Book of Forlorn Blood
2. The Book of Pulsing Flesh
3. The Book of Powerful Arms
4. The Book of Trotting Legs
5. The Book of Rising Intellect
6. The Book of Supporting Bones
7. The Book of The All-Seeing Eye

=== New, major and minor characters ===
Junior (ジュニア, Junia)
Voiced by: Mitsuki Saiga (Japanese); J.D. Stone (English)
Joker's youngest henchman and extremely violent assassin, Junior is a mysterious, effeminate young boy about Anita King's own age who is a highly skilled master marksman and secret agent working confidentially under the British Library's Special Operations Division. While on missions for Joker, he is referred to as Agent J and usually carries out dangerous and difficult missions using his physical intellect and martial arts, stealth, and his power of intangibility, which is later revealed to be a trait he inherited from his mother.
As an agent, Junior is highly adept at deceiving his enemies, comparable to Joker, Junior's enigmatic boss. While he is efficient as an agent, he somewhat lacks the ruthlessness of his legal caretakers, Joe Carpenter (Joker) and Wendy Earhart, or his father, Ikkyu Sojun. Extremely reserved and emotionally distant, he is easily drawn to those who show him kindness, which can explain his deep attraction towards the Paper Sisters whom he befriends later on. Because he was raised by a Government agency, he is socially inept and his withdrawn demeanor and inexperience with friendship and love hints at a lonely upbringing. After meeting Anita King in the Nishihama middle school, he becomes less aloof and he begins to develop a sense of individuality.
Late in the series, Junior is revealed to be the child of two I-jin, Nancy Makuhari and the deceased Ikkyū Sōjun, and the tool in Joker's scheme. As the son of two great, though distinct beings, whose intellect and physiology is deemed as superior above all other humans, Joker considers him as "the perfect vessel"; hence Joker is keen to train him as an agent and later as a medium for resurrecting The Gentleman, an ancient man of power beyond knowledge. Because of the I-jin's sudden extinction, which took place five years earlier before the TV series and nine months prior to his birth, it could be said that Junior and his mother are the last of the I-jin.
Lee Linho (リー・リンホー, Rī Rinhō)
Voiced by: Shinichiro Miki (Japanese); Patrick Seitz (English)
Nenene Sumiregawa's editor, who hired the Paper Sisters to guard her early on in the series. Usually very calm, despite apparently having recently given up smoking (evidenced by chewing a red pen, also a tool of his profession). Seemingly minor at first, he plays a bigger and darker role as the scope of Dokusensha's plans – for Nenene in particular – is revealed. Nenene gives him a Zippo lighter, which eventually returns to the giver along with important information.
John Woo (ジョン・ウー, Jon Wu) or Woo-san (ウーさん, Wusan)
A carrier pigeon used by Mr. Kim to send messages and assignments to the Paper Sisters. The sisters name him after the famous Chinese film director, one of whose trademarks is the use of doves to highlight dramatic moments. The pigeon demands respect and pecks Maggie when she forgets to call him "-san" ("Mr."). It is unclear then, exactly how the pigeon communicates, as Mr. Lee tells him to "shut up" even though the bird did not vocalize anything. While originally serving Dokusensha, Mr. Woo remains a "friend" to the Three Sisters throughout the series.
Mr. Kim (金さん, Kimu-san)
Voiced by: Shigeru Ushiyama (Japanese); John E. Breen (English)
A Dokusensha operative who hands the sisters their mission briefings; Michelle refers to him as their "handler." He can usually be seen overseeing these missions from a safe distance away. Sonny Wong is often with him. During the "Twilight of the Papers," Mr. Kim disappears during the conflict in Dokusensha headquarters, only to turn up much later as a minor employee for the British Library.
Sonny Wong (サニー・ウォン, Sanī Won) a.k.a. "The Recycler"
Voiced by: Takaya Kuroda (Japanese); Ivan Buckley (English)
A Paper Master employed by Dokusensha. He is mysterious, wearing sunglasses and a large coat that conceal most of his face, and he never speaks. He is physically strong. He has no qualms about killing people to achieve his goals. He challenges the Paper Sisters during "Twilight of the Papers" episodes and proves stronger than all three combined, even capable of ripping Maggie's familiars apart with his hands, and he only meets his fate after Maggie successfully manages to fight him defensively until he is engulfed in a sea of ink released when a series of explosives in the building go off.
Professor Webber
Voiced by: Kazuki Yao (Japanese); Freddy Douglas (English)
An enthusiast and supporter of the British Empire. After the fire incident in the British library, he was entrusted by the British library to guard "The Book of Pulsating Flesh." He lives in a Romanian castle together with his faithful servant, Irving. The castle exterior and interior were specially design to detect disturbance from a certain distance and at the same time emit frequency on its own. As shown in TV series, he is an expert in sound and frequency where he uses a special pipe organ (also known as a frequency organ) to transmit various frequency to control mammals, manipulate people's emotions and create a semi-visible shield to protect himself. He holds a grudge against Yomiko Readman since she was responsible for the fire in the British Library. Though he proves to be a challenge to the Paper Sisters, he is defeated when the Paper Sisters create a paper "silencer" field which allows them to bypass his protection field.
Alice Alice Arquette a.k.a. "Triple A"
Voiced by: Kae Araki (Japanese); Hellena Taylor (English)
Former archaeologist from British Museum and onsen freak. She was a British library agent whose mission was to retrieve the "Key" to activate the Sleeping Books, hidden in an ancient storeroom under a hot spring mountain built by her family. She was killed without mercy while surrendering by Sonny Wong, angering Drake, Nenene, and the Paper Sisters (despite the fact that Wong was technically there to help the Sisters), and Drake attempts to avenge her death.
Richard
Voiced by: Matsuo Matsuo (Japanese); Arthur Russell (English)
Another British Library agent believed to have gone rogue, who happened to meet Anita at her junior high school. He is hunted down by the British Library, who sent Junior to kill him and retrieve the book. He asks Anita to hide one of Mr Gentleman’s books when Junior shoots him. Before Anita and her sisters return to Hong Kong, she returns the book to Richard, who is recuperating in the hospital. After she leaves, however, Junior phases through a wall and takes the book, leaving Richard either unconscious or dead.
John Smith
Voiced by: Osamu Hosoi (Japanese); Doug Stone (English)
A famous and an intelligent actor in theatrical circle, turned British Library agent. Dokusensha believes he sold the book entrusted to him by the British Library and used the money to build a town where the population were dedicated to his acting. Their efforts to divert the Paper Sisters from their mission to find the Sleeping Books are frighteningly effective. The town however is effectively wiped off the map afterwards by the Dokusensha. It is also important to note that the term "John Smith" means someone who remains nameless like Joe Bloggs or John Q. Public, this fact plays a vital role in uncovering who exactly he is in his episode.
President Cole
Voiced by: Hideyuki Umezu (Japanese); Michael McConnohie (English)
The President of the United States. Throughout the series he supports Joker's plans with the understanding that the United States would be the leading nation in the new world order Gentleman would bring about when resurrected. When he learns that it will be the United Kingdom, not the United States, to lead the new world order, he attempts to attack the UK only to have his forces destroyed. He is probably the same U.S. President shown in the Read or Die OVA, as he speaks with a Texan accent and when faced with adversity wets himself.

== Production ==
=== Japan: J.C. Staff ===
==== Conception ====
The pitch for the TV series, as a direct continuation of the OVA, came in 2001 after the idea to re-cut the prequel with new animated scenes and re-release it as a film was dropped. Though Nenene never appeared in the OVA, concept sketches of her character were still included in the original pitch deck to SME Visual Works and the creators planned for her to feature heavily in the proposed film.

This was partly because both Japanese and American fans had complained to series creator and writer Hideyuki Kurata at pre-screenings and conventions that Nenene, who was a fan favorite of the light novels and manga especially in Japan, was absent from the OVA. Therefore, it was decided that Nenene would be cast as a main character for the TV series where Kurata elaborated: "If that was what the world wanted, then we had to let her appear in the show! [...] [She] had given people dreams and laughter and had shown un-highschool-girl-like [sic] manliness."

Furthermore, he "wanted to take the sequel in a cheerier direction [compared to the serious tone of the OVA], like Charlie's Angels." "[T]he characters in our R.O.D are mostly middle-aged men," Kurata recalled humorously in a discussion he had with director Koji Masunari (referring mainly to the large cast of supporting men from the original novels as well as the lineup of antagonists in the OVA). Both creators expressed interest in a TV series sequel, using Charlie's Angels as a springboard for a show with "lots of girls in it" to set it apart from the R.O.D incarnations that came before it. However, Kurata has felt that the men of R.O.D "seem rather overshadowed by the female characters" in the TV series as he related strongly (half-joking) to their work ethic and "devot[ion] to their jobs," even if it involved "taking over the world [in Joker's case] or earning money for child support [like Drake]." Though Kurata considered the story of the OVA to be complete, he also said that "there were still many mysteries left behind."

==== Characters, story and setting ====
===== Women of Read or Die =====
Kurata has commented that although he had written Nenene as a teenager in the Read or Die novels and comics, which preceded the OVA as a promotional gig, (Note: Hayashi, 2013, p. 108. Q: "So 'R.O.D' started off as an anime project? How did that lead to a novel?" Kurata: "SME [which asked me to make a 'female spy story' OVA] wanted to attract a wide audience. [...] So I guess the novel deal came from [SME's connections with Shueisha, the publishing company], though a novel had always been part of the master plan. [...] I did the manga and novel 'originals' to act as the backbone [for the anime].") he discovered while writing the TV series that Nenene was essentially a "new character." Five years had passed between the OVA and TV series and she made her onscreen debut, technically, in R.O.D the TV as a grown woman, presenting a slightly different personality than her literary counterpart. "She was at a big turning point in her life," Kurata stated. "The young, energetic, soulful dynamite-girl turned into a not-fully-burning, stagnating woman." In addition, Kurata claimed that Nenene's name had originally been "Mimimi," which he borrowed from Japanese novelist Ryu Murakami's 1983 film, Daijōbu, My Friend, thinking it was an appropriate name. For some reason, character designer Taraku Uon had misread Kurata's notes for the character, mistaking her name for "Nenene." "I thought this [name sounded] more unusual, so [her] name became 'Nenene'," which both the staff and voice actors had trouble pronouncing. "Thus did Nenene," Kurata was quoted, "become the bane of voice actors for the next ten years."

On the subject of Wendy, another fan favorite of the R.O.D "literary verse," Kurata was hit with a wave of criticism from fans for how she was portrayed in the TV series. "Wendy used to be the one who would soften the mood," the creator considered, "by being a perfect blunder-maker. [...] When the tension in Read or Die was getting high, I thought she was the kind of character who would break things down. [...] But now, she's changed into a mature, competent, capable lady!" Answering the question of what exactly could have taken place from the time frame of the OVA to the time skip in the TV series that would have produced such a dramatic change (apart from Wendy's falling out with Yomiko), Kurata said: "I did try to think of a character setting for her. But I felt that if I did, I would be creating the 'correct answer'."

He supplemented: "The cast members are much older [in the TV show]." Therefore, he stayed faithful to her clumsiness (mostly off-screen), but focused on her "strong will" in her decision making where she "always follow[ed] through," explaining: "Otherwise, that kind of organization [the British Library needed] would have been [a mess without Wendy]."

"[She had to become] a capable secretary," agreed artist Uon. "[I imagine for her, it was like this:] 'I have no choice but to follow Joker.' I wonder if that's the case."

The animators at J.C. Staff agreed that "under the surface, she's still the Wendy we knew." In an interview with seiyu Mika Sakenobe, she related that Wendy "has also grown into a cool, capable woman. What the hell happened during the five years, I'm curious?!" Like viewers, she was not given exclusive details on Wendy's backstory. "What kind of ending is waiting for her?" she had teased the staff. "Wendy is loyal to Joker [but] how far will she go [for him]?!"

Kurata not only borrowed her family name from the famous pilot, Amelia Earhart but lifted it from a character in Pokémon artist Keiko Fukuyama's manga, Jelly Beans. The clumsy, office girl persona of OVA-era Wendy was derived from the work of mangaka Hisaichi Ishii while her ambiguous Anglo-Indian heritage (which is only revealed in the "TV OH" DVD booklets and not in-universe) was inspired by the 1970s anime series, Perīnu Monogatari, which in turn is based on the classic French novel, Nobody's Girl penned by Hector Malot.

Another character that changed dramatically from the OVA to the TV series (along with her novel version) was Nancy. For the cast interview printed in the "TV OH" booklet of Volume 8, Nancy's seiyu, Michiko Neya demonstrated that she was more than happy to reprise her role from the previous work. However, Kurata and his team at J.C. Staff told her very little of what took place within the five-year timeline. She was very confused when the series introduced the three sisters as the protagonists, wondering how they were related to Yomiko and Nancy. She was also surprised at the noticeable change in Joker and Wendy's relationship (there was no hint of a romance in the OVA) and was shocked when she learned Nancy was a parent. "[Nancy] is completely different from the OVA," admitted Neya. Speaking in her character's voice, she elaborated: "My mental age is younger [than how I look] and while I can directly express [these complicated] emotions [I'm going through], I [am] stand[ing] in this position [between] being a child-like woman and a mother."

When asked why he decided not to recast Yomiko as a main character, he explained: "I think it was because she had too many things working against her. After all, she's 25 and unemployed." He continued: "[A]s a anime heroine, [a 30-year-old adult is] a pretty venturous age setting. [...] [C]onsidering that she has her own past and has had a certain amount of life experiences, I think this age [25 in the OVA; 30 in the series] is most suitable to her." Japanese novelist Seishi Yokomizo was a vital influence for Kurata's conception of Yomiko's TV version. He referenced a well-known Yokomizo protagonist, detective Kosuke Kindaichi as a muse, such as the character's "charming" agelessness, despite that Kurata's heroine "couldn't quite get rid of all the earthiness and worldly desires" that Yokomizo's character rejected.

===== The Paper Sisters =====
Director Masunari stated: "We knew we had to create something that would appeal to more than just our original 10,000 fans [of the OVA]." "[I]t would've been impossible to do 26 episodes of that OVA version on television, so we created a more dialogue-based story, with action woven in [and a different tone]." Based on these reasons, Kurata invented three sisters to join Nenene, resetting episode one in Hong Kong (compared to the rest of the episodes set in Jinbo-cho, other districts of Tokyo and London). "Tokuyuki Matsutake [an animator], for reasons unknown, drew a Hong Kong-based scene for the OVA's opening sequence," said Kurata. "That's how we ended up with three sisters in Hong Kong." The writer further credited Masunari with sparking the idea of a heroic trio; Masunari had worked on Kokoro Library, which featured three sisters among the show's cast.

"The first episode is the most important, of course," said Masunari in a 2005 interview, "because I wanted to show everyone that although the sibling characters were introduced, it was still R.O.D." Additionally, "the OVA is only for old men and old ladies," joked Kurata. "So [in the] next [version, I wanted] to do something more glamorous [with three sisters]," citing the term "moe" as the show's aesthetic. "Apparently, there was some booing [from fans]," remembered Kurata when he announced in anime magazines that the Paper Sisters were his new protagonists. Kurata name-dropped various Izumi Takemoto manga titles as examples for his team to work off of for the central mood, including The Holy Girl Who Kicked Her Out as well as the work of writer Ohira Michuru.

When it came to naming the sisters, it has been noted that the girls share the namesakes of the popular Hong Kong actresses who starred in The Heroic Trio: Michelle Yeoh, Maggie Cheung and Anita Mui, which were recycled as Michelle Cheung, Maggie Mui and Anita King (Note: In Episode 10: "A Christmas Carol," it is revealed that the sisters are, in fact, adopted, which explains their different family names.) ("King" deriving from the alternate reading of "Yeoh": "Khan." In turn, "Khan" directly translates as "king"). "[It's] probably much too close to be called a coincidence," said the producer of New Generation Pictures, Kevin Chu (one half of the team responsible for the English adaptation). "So I believe that it's safe to say that Kurata-san is a fan."

Kurata aimed to draw distinct personalities for each of the Paper Sisters. Anita, in particular, "became a strong Izumi Takemoto character," Uon, the character designer thought, "kicking [her sisters] and picking her nose." Also, her complaint, "I hate school" in an early episode was lifted directly from a scene in one of Takemoto's manga. In spite of her entitled persona, Kurata chose to give Anita central focus, hinting at a traumatic history early in the story's development. However, although bits and pieces of Anita's past grow less muddled when Yomiko is introduced to the Paper Sisters in the second half of their character arc, Kurata left many loose threads in her backstory that were never resolved. "Anita was the one who survived the fire five years ago when Yomiko destroyed the British Library," reported Animage. "How [exactly] did Anita end up in Hong Kong as she was born at the British Library and living in the UK (Joker stated that she was kidnapped by Dokusensha, but these details are vague)? Plus, the file that Joker had in his possession: we were shown a photo of Anita next to Junior, along with some information about Anita's true identity." Due to time constraints, Kurata was not able to provide answers for these plot threads.

Michelle, Kurata noted, had to be "original and innovative." Through grueling meetings with his team, the creators landed on three "keywords" for her personality: "likes shallow entertainment, dregs of mankind, and natural." An early rough draft of the pilot episode based Michelle's mannerisms and dialogue on the title protagonist in Furuhata Ninzaburō, a '90s police procedural drama (notably, the quirks in Furuhata's speech, such as his humming). Uon believed, however, that Michelle wasn't an especially "funny character," but represented the "older sister type, in a sexy way." Kurata offered his own take, half-joking that she was the "useless older sister."

Maggie was inspired by two characters - firstly, Sakaki in Azumanga Daioh, and secondly Aoi Mizuno from one of Noriko Kuwata's manga titles, Takkyu Sentai PinPon 5 (lit. Table Tennis Squadron Ping-Pong 5). Concerning the casting process, seiyu Hiromi Hirata made her voice acting debut as the reserved Maggie Mui, which was the polar opposite of her usual bubbly persona. Although she was an unknown talent, her ability to slip seamlessly into Maggie's moody nature was exactly what the creative team was searching for. "Maggie, unlike what her outward appearance suggests, is different on the inside than on the outside," said Hirata. "I wonder if [the audience] can understand and accept her inner love, cuteness and weakness as the story progresses [...] [because I] want to grow with Maggie."

Along with Charlie's Angels, Kurata modeled the style of the sisters' banter from the Okuda (a.k.a. "Onda") Sisters, characters which featured in the 1980s Fuji TV Network sitcom Yappari neko ga suki (lit. I Like Cats After All!, or Love Cats). The themes of genetic engineering, which feature in the second half of the series (touching on the sisters' origin story), were inspired by the Japanese author Toshiko Endo's comic, Heaven. Other literary influences were derived from H.G. Wells's War of the Worlds. "That was the first novel that I ever read," said Kurata which he embedded visual elements from in the end of Episode 24: "You Know Me".

===== Nishihama Students and the Men of R.O.D =====
Kurata wrote the teleplays for the anime and the manuscripts for the Read or Dream chapters concurrently (plus, balanced his work load with the ongoing light novels). He worked closely with artist Ran Ayanaga, one of the character designers who joined the creative team to produce sketches of the background characters and Anita's classmates. Her chief responsibilities coincided with drawing the artwork for Read or Dream and she was credited with the original designs for Anita's closest companion, Hisami and Hisami's childhood friend, Toru Okahara. Though he had invented Hisami for the TV series to begin with (and was heavily influenced by Ayanaga's designs that would be re-adapted for the Read or Dream manga), Kurata explained: "Because [Hisami had] already appeared in the anime [in 2003 before Read or Dream volumes 3 and 4 were published in 2004 and 2005, respectively], when we got ready for Hisami to appear in the manga, we gave it some thought. We thought we'd have some overlap with the anime, but make her a little different. In the anime, she's an ordinary schoolgirl, but for the manga we made her a young novelist [like novel Nenene]." Kurata took advantage of the creative space he had in the manga chapters to expand on her relationship with Anita.

Considering the opposite moods of the OVA and TV sequel: "The main motif - or theme, rather," said Masunari, "was 'bonds.' In the previous work, we dug deep into the bonds of friendship between Yomiko and Nancy. [For the TV series] we made the theme 'family bonds.' That's probably the reason it feels so different." While Kurata and Masunari arrived at a consensus from the start to stay true to the show's themes of female friendships and familial love, Kurata claimed that he balanced these stories by "express[ing] the sorrow and hardness of being a man through the male characters," citing Joker and Drake as prime examples. "I've known [them] for a long time," commented Kurata, "[as] a pair of old faces" since he began writing the novels, manga and OVA.

Joker's seiyu, Hozumi Goda conveyed his joy at returning to perform in the TV sequel, even if he had to find another voice for his character as his personality was no longer the same. "[In the OVA], I think [Joker] was a good and humble person," he was quoted in the DVD interview for Volume 6. While the tone and character setting had changed significantly from the OVA, he explained: "I'm certain this does not mean that Joker has become a bad person. For him, it's not about justice. It's: 'Let's do it'." Goda believed too that Joker's inner qualities were still very much present, that his views of the world were there "since the beginning." He said further: "I don't have an answer [for how he changed]." On the dubbing process for his role, Goda listed the '90s Fuji Television anime, Chibi Maruko-chan as a source of inspiration (especially the protagonist's grandfather, Tomozou) for the "rough villainy" of Joker's emotions. One of the biggest changes that Kurata considered for his character, which never came to fruition, was that he and Nancy would have had a child together. The identity of the child's father would be given to another character from the OVA (which, story-wise, would have made more sense).

Masami Iwasaki, who originated the voice of Drake, was just as ecstatic to come back to the R.O.D universe. "I hope [we] can feel the original Drake somewhere [from the OVA]," he said, predicting: "[The story is] going to become more and more difficult with the British Library, fighting, and that kind of thing. Yeah, there's a lot of spoilers." On the DVD commentary tracks, Kurata dropped bits and pieces regarding Drake's backstory that never had a chance to make an appearance on-screen or through dialogue, revealing that Drake had a complicated relationship with his parents as a child and experienced an equally difficult relationship with his wife, which ended in divorce. "His father was a failure," he said. "I guess his relationship with his mother was a failure, so his relationship with his daughter is much better [than what he had growing up]." The characters that Drake grows close to throughout the series are "quite unique in that they are [...] extremely bad at communicating, or extremely good at it."

Because of how Kurata saw himself in the male cast, at one point, he even proposed that he could have written a script starring only the men, "a surprisingly moving story heaped with emotion," which would have been similar to Akira Yokoyama's Project X manga series. "I'd put [Junior] in the girls' team," he joked, "since he's still a kid [...] and have him enjoy the flirtation paradise."

Mitsuki Saiga, looking to expand her career from a pop artist to an actress, (Note: Newtype, 2003, p. 110. Saiga: "By the time I turned 20 [ca. 1993], I'd been working in the industry for two years. But I didn't have any regular gigs, and I was lucky if I landed one role in six months - or even one audition a year. [...] I was [...] about to take the first step toward becoming a voice actress.") was selected for the voice of Junior as she could convincingly disguise her voice and sound like a young boy on the cusp of puberty (except, she admitted she was confused about his gender when she was first cast). Junior was one of her earliest voice acting gigs, commenting: "I think there is a certain amount of conscious effort put into playing a boy." Similar to actress Mika Sakenobe and her lack of knowledge surrounding Wendy's backstory, Saiga had also been kept in the dark about Junior's fate, learning of his character arc only during the recording sessions. "Junior is a completely blank person," Saiga thought. "I still can't read who he is [when I finished Volume 3's episodes], if he is [just] one person or not. [In my first episode] he was expressionless, emotionless, and totally inorganic. He felt like nothing but an empty feeling, but he also met and bonded with Anita and Michelle. When I met and interacted with them and other [characters], I suddenly became a human being. I'm [only now] starting to see the essence [of his character] and it was great to see him interact with friends and family. [...] I think that it would be nice to let [him be happy]." She described how much she appreciated Anita as a character and as a friend to Junior, observing that while Michelle happened to be a support system for her character (and that she did indeed enjoy her presence in the show), she also felt that Michelle could be suffocating and overprotective. "I feel like I'm a bit of a stranger [next to Michelle in the booth]. [But] the first time that Anita called me a friend, I felt loved."

Kurata's commentary of Junior's character was more or less similar, perceiving the frustration he experienced in the second half of his arc, harboring sensitive feelings for Michelle, in particular, as a direct parallel to his unrequited feelings for Wendy - both women representing mother figures to him for which he lacked, and neither of whom attempted to understand him. Writing the first "true" conversation between Wendy and Junior in Episode 14 was, according to him, intentionally stiff, which heightened Junior's atypical upbringing and emotional immaturity in social interactions. Junior, he observed, was the odd one out in the principal cast. "Anita has her sisters," he said, "and her friends, while Yomiko has Nenene and Nancy for emotional support [not to mention, Drake has his daughter]. Junior desperately wants a presence like that in his life." For this reason, Junior was driven to commit extreme actions in a state of "desperate loneliness." Not knowing how the series would end, Saiga conveyed the type of family dynamic she wanted for Junior which was significantly opposite to his home life with Joker and Wendy, hoping that Nenene and Michelle could fill the roles of the mother figures and Drake as the father.

===== Future of the Franchise =====
From the time of pitching the OVA to wrapping up production on the TV series, Kurata, Masunari and Ishihama had worked exhaustively with barely a break in their schedules for over five years. Journalists for Japanese publications pressed Kurata if the next R.O.D installment would be a feature film project, though following the completion of Volume 9, "there is no plans or ideas for the sequel at this moment [minus the novels, not yet finished in 2004]," he was quoted. "R.O.D still worked even when we switched the main characters from Yomiko to the three sisters, so I think there's room for change in the next version."

He summed up his ideas: "But personally, Yomiko is the character that I would like to keep on writing about. [...] However, [...] I want [R.O.D] to be a show that comes back unexpectedly just when everybody has forgotten about it."

==== Art design ====
Secondary character designer and animation director Masashi Ishihama turned to the Yappari neko ga suki sitcom for ideas on the show's mise-en-scène, using the set of the family's apartment as a "look book" for the design of Nenene's apartment. "I watched the show," commented Ishihama, "and drew the apartment exactly as it was," taking it further than a simple reference. "I kept watching it like a maniac," he admitted, working from a newly purchased box set of Neko as his homework project since he "was wrongly filled with a sense of mission [...] to somehow produce the exact replica." The second story of the girls' living arrangements, on the other hand, was newly visualized. "I guessed from the first floor [of how the Neko apartment would look] and made it up accordingly. [...] [I]t's as much fun to assemble the space in which the characters will exist [as it is to invent the characters as people]."

The Paper Sisters' designs, according to Kurata and main character designer Taraku Uon, went through drastic changes. Masashi Ishihama, as animation director in charge of streamlining the staff's art into a uniform style, has expressed the challenges he experienced in remaining faithful to Uon's original work while adapting the characters from still drawings to animation. "Those characters are, personally, the kind of girls I'm attracted to," he elaborated. "So that's how it happened [with the quality of their designs]."

Maggie's original design where she sported long silver hair and side locks was eventually recycled for a supporting character. Kurata commented, "She looked like a grown-up Junior [Anita's friend who secretly works for Joker];" therefore, this became the basis for Junior's final design. Deciding the color palette for the characters, Uon said: "I imagine[d] Junior's skin to be white," which complimented the silver tones in his hair. "But it's pretty dull and grayish [on paper]," explaining that he hoped the color grading would have appeared stronger on television screens. "I [wanted Junior's final character sheet] to have a cel-like finish [before handing it in to J.C. Staff]. When I have a problem [with color correction], I try to make [the colors] brighter."

"Tall, androgynous with cool eyes, mysterious and withdrawn" were the artist's motifs for Maggie and based on these themes, Uon playfully dubbed her a "white witch" when he envisioned her as a "silver-haired samurai," identifying her as "a surely feline character" who happened to be one of his favorite sisters. Referring to Maggie's interest in cooking, it was Uon who originated this idea, finalizing her character sheets with her wearing an apron. "It seems that she has already proven to be a good cook [before she was animated]," Kurata observed, "[because Michelle] doesn't seem to cook, and Anita is a brat." Uon revealed he drew inspiration from artist Izumi Takemoto in his designs for Michelle due to Takemoto's "distinct cuteness;" she appeared slightly younger in these early sketches, wearing an Alice band over medium length hair that lacked her signature curls. "Beautiful and gentle, she warms every aspect of a man," Uon described her in a production interview with PALETTA.

Kurata added of Anita's design: "[T]he character we created no doubt [also] had an Izumi Takemoto-esque nuance at its core." Uon sketched her sporting messy pigtails and overalls, which eventually morphed into a Hong Kong-style cheongsam with a frog print and braided twin buns (or the Chinese "ox horn" hairdo). Uon and Ishihama would recycle these ideas, giving Anita a shaggy pixie cut instead, though keeping her obsession for frogs and a nod to the "お団子 (odango)" hairstyle (Note: "Twin buns" are referred to as "odango" in Japanese.) in her finalized battle outfit with bun coverings (which only sit on top of her head as accessories). Uon claimed he referenced "panda ears" for Anita's twin buns. Due to her youth and outward innocence (along with her role as a central heroine), Uon has named Anita as one of his favorite characters to work on. "She's lively and cute," he told PALETTA Magazine in 2003. "Even if she's a boyish girl." He stated further in a later issue: "I always see her in the TV show [in] a lively atmosphere, but [in my cover art for PALETTA, she is] a normal girl. I wanted to try drawing [her quiet side]."

Choosing the color palette for the cast, especially the sisters, fell on Uon. "To balance [them] out," he said, "I [initially] used gold, red and black [hair shades]," noting that director Masunari preferred color grading that was subdued. "[But] [i]f [we] make the color even a little bit stronger," Uon suggested to him, "it will stand out [more]." He would recall how selecting Anita's permanent palette was "adventurous," choosing a hair shade of "lollipop-pink" for her finalized character sheet (yet refusing to explain why). Only after the fact was Kurata asked by his manga editor at Shueisha why the Paper Sisters didn't wear glasses like Yomiko ("girls with glasses" being a common topic that was thrown around for possible storylines), to which Kurata joked: "Will putting glasses on girls make them prettier?"

"Nenene was [supposed to be] a lolita [fashion girl in the novels]," revealed Uon in his commentary for her early drafts, a normal high school girl who may have been an award-winning YA novelist, but accidentally became involved with Yomiko through odd incidents, further addressing how she and Yomiko were meant to be polar opposites. Kurata recalled: "The heroine, Yomiko, is quiet and has a big sister personality [in the first plot I had written]."

"But then halfway through," commented Uon, "[Nenene] started acting like a big sister. [...] I thought she'd be a pretty girl [when I started drawing her], but in the end, she turned out to be a pretty wild and active character. [But] no matter how her expressions contorted [in anger], her cute girlish features are still there."

The artist behind the Read or Dream manga, Ran Ayanaga worked on the comics as well as acted as a "third" original character designer simultaneously for the TV series, sketching for minor characters that Uon and Ishihama weren't able to fit into their busy schedules. Particularly, she created the physical attributes for Anita's best friend, Hisami, the boy that crushes on her, Okahara, Anita's classmates, Toko and Chiho, and the remaining students of Nishihama Junior High School (Kurata would go on to include Hisami, Okahara and others in the later half of Read or Dream in chapters that were written after the show, attempting to find some "overlap" with their anime counterparts). She said: "It was a lot of fun to see my drawings move and talk [in the anime] [...] but I had so much trouble making them look cute. I'm afraid I created problems for Ishihama, the animator." She continued: "It's easier to draw characters who have lots of facial expressions [so Anita and Michelle were the easiest]." During the manga's run alongside the anime broadcast, the art would progress slightly, especially Anita's physical development, as Ayanaga commented: "At first she hardly had any breasts, but when I saw how flat-chested she was in the anime, I decided to give her more of a figure [in later chapters]."

Kurata hired her for Read or Dream after reading her work, Gwa2 in Ultra Jump as he wished to separate the Paper Sisters' project from the action aesthetic of the R.O.D manga, having the art style channel the manga adaptation of Yappari neko ga suki as well as Izumi Takemoto's Aoi-chan Panic! (in other words, his goal was to produce "cute manga"). In spite of the team's confidence in her skills, she said: "[Shutaro] Yamada-san [the mangaka of R.O.D] did such great work [on the original manga series], and to bring my drawing style in... I worried that he'd think I'd destroyed his image of the series." Yamada disagreed, complimenting her warm art style. Splitting her time on the comics and the show proved disastrous. At one point, she had barely finished a chapter when she had just ten days left of her monthly deadline to send her manuscript out to her publisher.

A genuine book designer, Noriyuki Zinguzi was hired to design the many covers of the fictional titles that appear throughout the show, including two separate editions for Nenene Sumiregawa's Midnight Liberation Zone (the first edition printed in Japanese, the second in Hong Kong Cantonese) and Haruhi Nishizono's First Love series. The shōjo cover art for the latter work was illustrated by Ayanaga.

=== America: New Generation Pictures ===
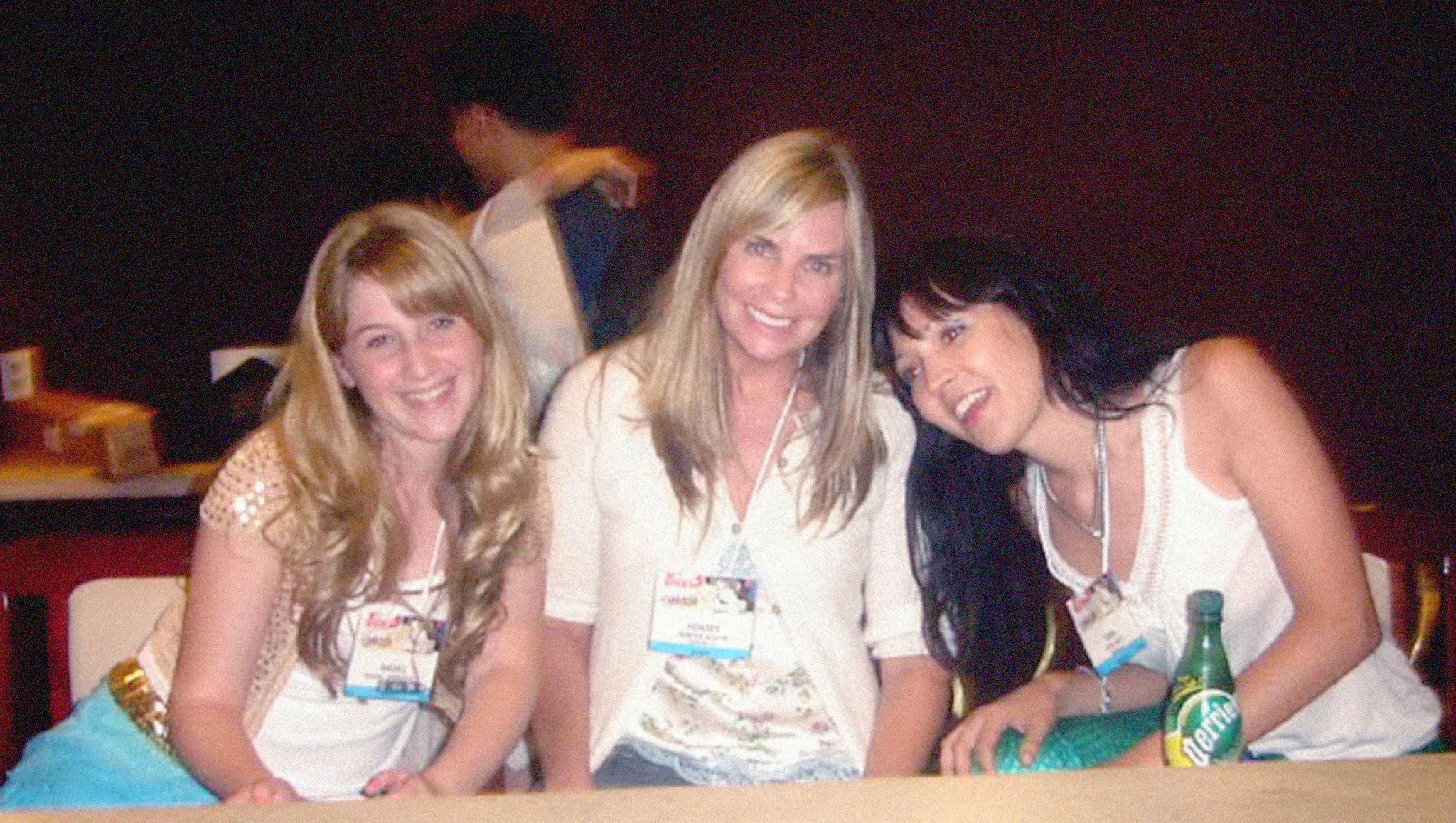
Rachel Hirschfeld (Anita King), Hunter Austin (Michelle Cheung) and Sara Lahti (Maggie Mui) sign autographs at Anime Expo in Anaheim, California (3 July 2005).

Producer Tomonori Ochikoshi had plans since 2004 to "fill the United States, Europe, and other countries of the world with R.O.D fans!" When the series' distribution rights were sold to the U.S., it was notable of the English staff at New Generation Pictures to not only cast Yomiko's English voice actor (among others) as authentically British (per request of the Japanese creators), but find authentic children to fill the child roles, opposed to the Japanese dub which cast adult performers (in fairness, this is not an unusual feature in the seiyu industry as noted on the Japanese and American commentary tracks; ADR director Taliesin Jaffe confirmed that he was not against the qualities of the original adult voices, such as Chiwa Saito as Anita).

Specifically, producer Kevin Chu recommended for his team to request a videotaped audition with child actress Rachel Hirschfeld for the role of Anita King as he had worked with her previously on Haibane Renmei (where she played a minor part, Hana). Hirschfeld, who was then new to anime dubs, came from a trained theatre background. She attended a performing arts middle school as well as starred as Tina Denmark in the acclaimed Off-Broadway musical, Ruthless! at the Hudson Mainstage Theatre in Hollywood, California during the second half of the series' dubbing production (which she "plugged" at the end of Volume 6's commentary track). (Note: Backstage, 2005: "[Rachel] Hirschfeld is very good as the tyro tyke, humorously proficient in switching from sweetness and light to Bad Seed glare at a moment's notice. She impressively holds her own among the adult actors...") "The voice that I used for Anita," revealed Hirschfeld on the DVD extras, "is not my normal voice; my normal voice is really high-pitched." Although Hirschfeld was a pre-teen like her character, she noted: "Anita and I have two totally different personalities. Anita is sort of a tomboy with magic powers, she's super smart and is like a parent trapped in a 13-year-old body."

A handful of the child actors were already acquainted with one another off-screen. Outside of New Gen titles, Hirschfeld had worked with Jessica D. Stone (voice of Junior) on a musical production at the Thousand Oaks Civics Arts Plaza while Megan Taylor Harvey (Hisami) and Brittney Lee Harvey (Toko, Anita's classmate) are sisters in real life. Hunter MacKenzie Austin, who portrayed Michelle, said she knew Hirschfeld from their previous dubbing work with New Generation Pictures (such as Angel Tales and Haibane Renmei). "[T]hose scenes [I played with Anita] were touching," related Austin, "even though [Hirschfeld and I] were never in the booth at the same time." Like Hirschfeld, Sara Lahti was also a new face to the dubbing industry and had originally sent a demo track for the part of Michelle Cheung before Jaffe contacted her, suggesting that she try again for Maggie (a character the team found difficult to cast) as her deeper voice, he felt, would have been more fitting for the boyish, introverted middle sister instead of the girly, bubbly Michelle. "[Maggie] may come across as a little cold and dark," commented Lahti, "but under it all she has a heart of gold and her loyalty is unconditional." This was Lahti's first credited voice over role as it was for Maggie's Japanese voice actress, Hiromi Hirata.

As a native of North Yorkshire and an alum of the Royal Academy of Dramatic Art, JB Blanc (voice of Joker) extended his skills towards not only acting but dialect coaching, mentoring J.D. Stone in the booth so she could acquire the authentic West London dialect that Jaffe envisioned for Junior's character (along with the core agents of the British Library). Stone had mentioned that Junior "is a very challenging character to do the voice for. It is a fun part, but not an easy one, because of both his British accent and his complicated personality," recalling how in the later episodes, she had issues with nailing " 'psychological' in a British a accent," for which she joked that Blanc would tease her for butchering the dialect. "And though our personalities are very different," she added, "that's probably what makes playing Junior so interesting and enjoyable, because I get to be someone totally unlike myself."

Blanc was cast in the show following his work with ADR director Taliesin Jaffe and producer Jonathan Klein on series such as Hellsing and L/R: Licensed by Royalty (the latter being where he made his voice directing debut). "What actor wouldn't jump at the chance to play the gentleman villain?" he said. "I really enjoy [Joker], not least because like most evil people, he sincerely believes in his cause and each action he takes seems to him to be the most natural thing in the world." On the other hand, he humorously remarked that he wasn't keen that Joker was blonde. Siobhan Flynn (voice of Wendy) was a British citizen like Blanc, originating from Wales before moving to Los Angeles and had worked with Blanc and producer Klein previously on L/R: Licensed by Royalty (as well as having a featured role in Hellsing). (Note: L.A. Style Confidential, 2007. "Siobhan FLYNN, 29, is an actress who lives in the Hollywood Hills. She is originally from Wales and moved to LA from London three years ago. Recently she finished filming Sex & Death 101, a comedy starring Winona Ryder. Her next project is an as yet untitled, independent film about transatlantic relationships.") Flynn was pleased to portray a female role that was "multi-faceted," feeling that Wendy only appeared charming on the exterior, but truthfully, harbored "a deep, possibly cold-blooded personality buried within." For an action series, she noted, "It is rare to find animation where the lead women are such strong and yet realistic characters," even when she took into account Wendy's attraction to Joker.

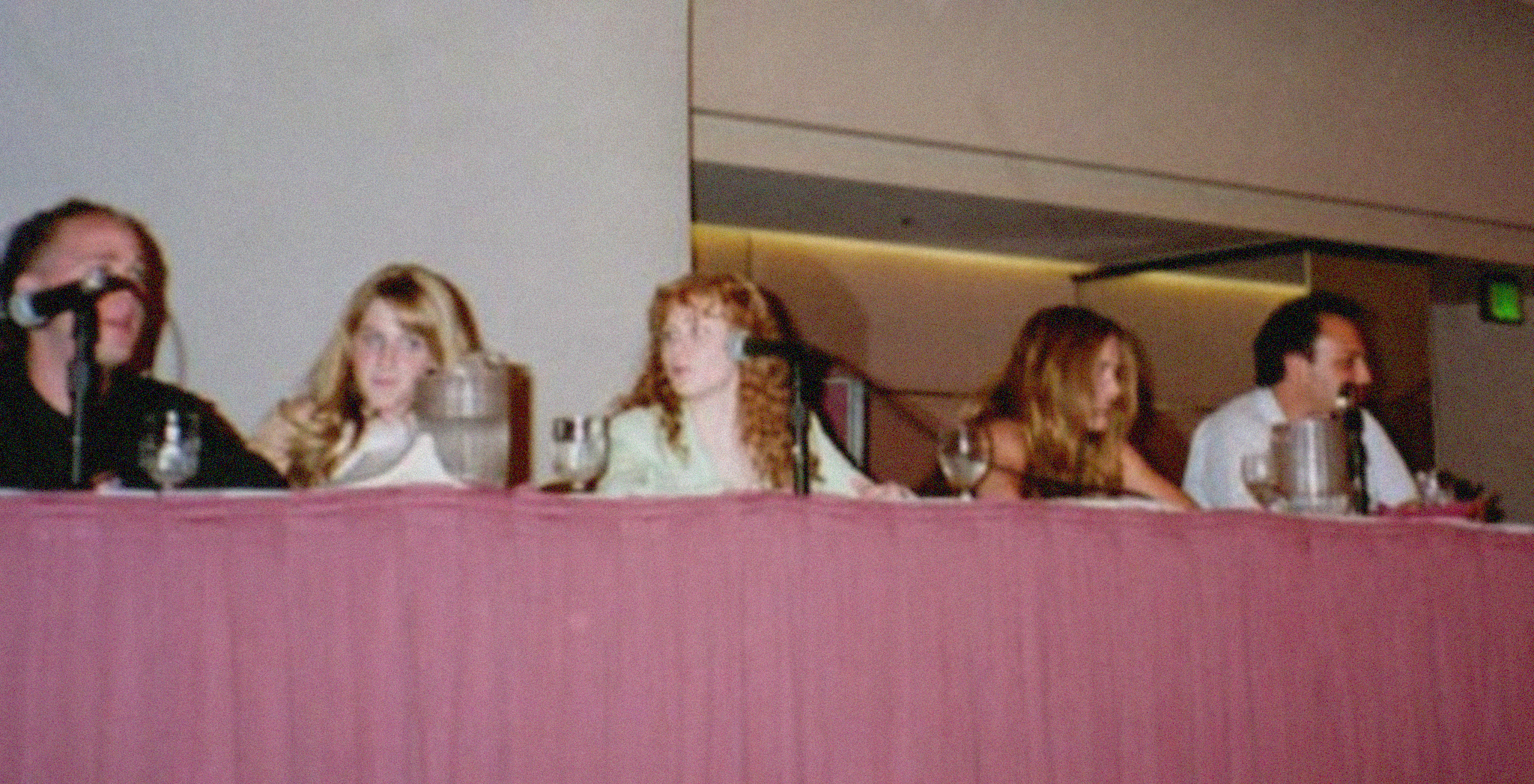
Taliesin Jaffe (ADR director), Rachel Hirschfeld (Anita), Jessica D. Stone (Junior), Siobhan Flynn (Wendy) and JB Blanc (Joker) at the R.O.D the TV panel at Anime Expo in Anaheim, California (3 July 2005).

Unlike Yomiko's OVA English dub counterpart, Hellena Taylor is an English native, having graduated from the London Academy of Music and Dramatic Art. Her interpretation of Yomiko was that she was "dorky, adorable, eccentric (don't forget naïve), and so very polite. I wanted to add a touch of silliness to her [...] [because she is] a very yin force in a yang world." Carrie Savage, cast as Nancy, was another recognizable face from the OVA whose character had been put through obvious physical and personality alterations. "Here was this grown woman," thought Savage, "with a child-like personality who also had to display the loving qualities of being a mother. [...] [But] I hope that she gets to go back to her vixen-risqué personality [from the OVA]."

Patrick Seitz was cast in a small yet pivotal role, playing Nenene's ex-smoker editor Mr. Lee (who may or may not have ulterior motives), yet Seitz related strongly to the characters and the show's themes. "Books have had quite an impact on me," he was quoted in the DVD extras. "I relate to the bookless daze in which Maggie stumbles through [Kanda-Jinbōchō], and Michelle's manic purchase of every title in sight, because I've acted similarly in like circumstances. I laugh at Nenene and Anita's frustration with them because it's a frustration my own appetite for books has so often prompted in my less text-addled friends."

Similarly, Lee Everest was given a minor though vital part as Drake, a familiar character from the OVA. Everest was thrilled that the character writing challenged the "two-dimensional" archetype of a "typical action-hero," pinpointing Drake's sarcasm as a safeguard to his inner emotions, yet at some point, he finds himself opening up to Anita. "Here is a man who cares deeply for his daughter," commented Everest, "so much that he's willing to take this life-risking work [and] it's his love for his daughter that endears him to the Paper Sisters, particularly Anita."

Hunter MacKenzie Austin (voice of Michelle) revealed in an interview with Anime Insider that although the cast remained separate, working different schedules at the studio, after three or four episodes had been recorded for each volume, all three Paper Sisters (Austin, Lahti and Hirschfeld), plus Wendy Tomson (Nenene) would be scheduled together to record "previews" (or TV spots), which was "really the only time the cast [was] in the studio together," explained Austin (Note: A Fan's View, 2005: "[W]hen [the actors] recorded the semi-improvisational coming attraction trailers, which were supposed to follow a script but usually spiraled into farce...") (excluding the audio commentary tracks). This mirrored the extras included with the Japanese physical release where the Paper Sisters (Kikuchi, Hirata and Saito) would interact with each other, on script and off.

== Release ==
The release of the DVDs and their special features were announced at such conventions as Anime Central 2004, where the Geneon Entertainment panel attended by producer Kevin Chu advertised the exclusive mini-pencilboard artwork that was to be included with first editions, which was repuplished from the Japanese illustration cards in the limited edition DVDs by Sony. Creator and writer, Hideyuki Kurata toured many events as a promotional gig for the show and the DVD releases, including his guest appearance at Anime Vegas in 2006.

To promote the limited edition DVDs, the English cast panel and signing held at Anime Expo in July 2005 was the first time most of the English voices had met each other in person. (Note: Anime Dream, 2005. Austin: "Anime Expo in Anaheim was a blast. [...] I had so much fun getting to meet so many fun and sweet people. I took pictures of everyone!")

== Reception ==
=== Critical response ===
==== Story, themes and characters ====
The series was positively received. Enoch Lau of THEM Anime Reviews argued that the series had a "refreshing concept" with an "ultra-cool" female protagonist as a bookworm, adding that the show was like a "good mystery novel" with some filler episodes. Furthermore, he stated that Maggie reminded him of Sakaki in Azumanga Daioh and that the paper fights were "cool." While praising the animation, art, detail, and character designs, he criticized the show's inconsistent pacing. Carlos and Giancarla Ross, writing for the same publication, argued that the series was a "more exciting and interesting tour of the world of library sciences" than Kokoro Library. Timothy Donohoo of CBR praised the series as perfect for bookworms and writers, arguing that it had an "interesting" take on writer's block, and called it a classic which was "one for the books." Theron Martin of Anime News Network compared the OVA and anime series, noting the "contrast [...] in focus and tone" between the two works. He explained that the anime series was more about relationships between the characters, unlike the OVA, adding that the OVA and TV series together were a "complete tale that can be a lot of fun to watch."

Caitlin Donnovan of The Mary Sue praised the series for having female superheroes with "amazing powers based on literature," writing that while the show could be "heartwrenching," it was, in her view, absurd and an "over-the-top sci-fi superhero fun." She also praised the action scenes, storyline, and the theme, which centered around "hardcore ladies kicking ass with the power of literacy." However, she noted some instances of fan service, gory deaths, torture, stereotypical Chinese characters, and sexualized female characters. Charles Webb of MTV commented that the series was the only anime "made for both bibliophiles and action fans alike." John Sinnott of DVD Talk reviewed the first four episodes and argued that it had a "good amount of humor, some action, and very good dramatic moments." Yuricon founder, Erica Friedman, argued that the show was the "standout anime" in 2003, emphasizing the intense and high-powered action in the first episode, which switched between "shounen and shoujo style writing." She called it the "most finely crafted anime" she had seen, and argued that the protagonists displayed yuri feelings for each other, noting these elements were the strongest between Anita and her school friend, Hisami.

Analyzing finale, Friedman thought that "[i]n terms of characters [...] Nenene wins, hands down. [...] But really, there's no bad or weak characterization. [...] Everyone really peaks as a character. And Nancy has some serious shiny moments which are totally kick-ass... even if they don't really make sense in terms of the history we've given her. I mean, brain tissue doesn't spontaneously regenerate when its [sic] been removed, does it?"

Revisiting the series in 2017, however elicited a contrasting response. Not only did Friedman perceive the animation quality to be "craptastic" when compared to modern standards, she dictated that "[t]he story turned out to be atrociously timed. As the United States is slipping more quickly than we could have imagined into a not-Democracy, with the assistance of Putin who would love to recreate the Soviet Union as the world leader, watching a story about Joker remaking the world in a former age’s image was hitting way too close to home. I was not series-angry with Joker’s stupid pretension of world peace, I was actually really angry. So that wasn’t so good." However, she went on to highlight the themes of overthrowing fascism, which was depicted the strongest through Yomiko's dialogue and her opposisition against Joker's regime, dictatorship, expansionism and colonialism. She further underscored how Joker used gaslighting against the Paper Sisters in revealing to them their false memories because in the end, none of what he said was relevant: Joker is an unreliable narrator. Thus, the Paper Sisters survive through "trust in [their] bonds [...] [by] not let[ting] the gaslighters get the final word."

Efrain Diaz, Jr., writing for IGN, called the show "an odd amalgam of action and soft drama [...] but never actually hitting them [on] the head." Furthermore, he believed the foreshadowing in the early episodes was too heavy-handed, which was "so thick even Michelle's best attempts to distract [us] will not keep people from noticing."

Commenting on the writing, Way Jeng of Mania praised the series for making "a clear distinction between the characters in their superhero aspect and their human aspect" and that "[n]one of these characters are powerful enough to win the fights on their own." However, he criticized the introduction of global conspiracies, which made the episodes "less personal" as "[t]he show's biggest strength has always been the characters." He added: "These new revelations are so large that it's [...] difficult to take the show seriously." On the positive side, he explained that the show avoided ending on a dramatic battle sequence as "none of the most interesting parts [...] revolve around the fate of the world" as this "doesn't drive the plot. The threat [...] is a fair external mirror of Junior's fate and the potential erasure of the [characters'] bond."

==== Vocal performances ====
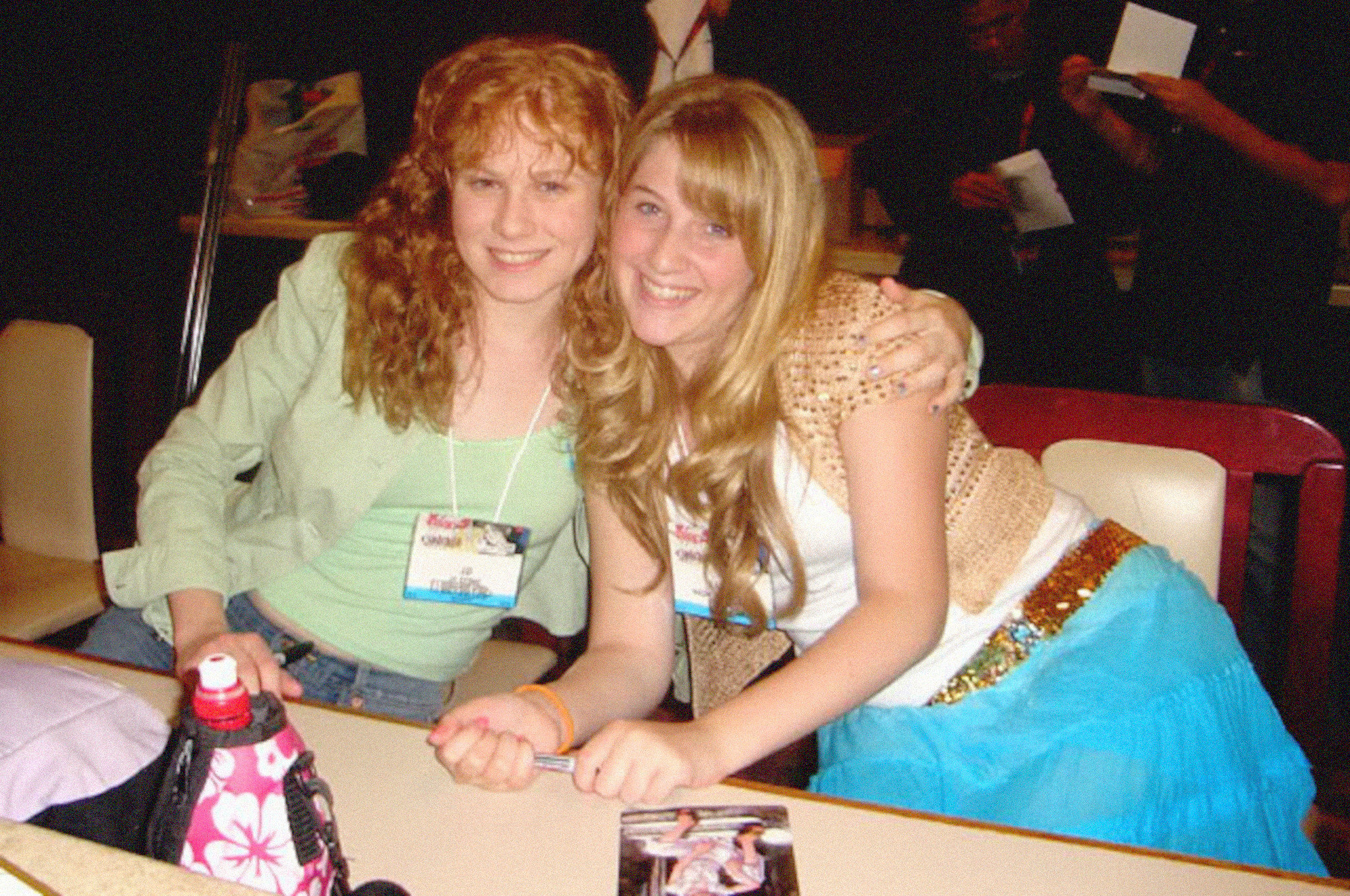
Jessica D. Stone (Junior) and Rachel Hirschfeld (Anita King) sign autographs at Anime Expo n Anaheim, California (3 July 2005).

While New Generation Pictures's English dub garnered positive attention from some publications, including Dub Review (now defunct) which emphasized the performances of Wendy Tomson (Nenene), the Paper Sisters, the villains and the child actors, elaborating: "I like the children who are played by children and therefore sound like children" as well as "genuine British accents for British characters (as in Hellsing and L/R)," comparatively, it has received criticism from other American reviewers. Anime Discover, located in Alabama, cited that the British accents were inauthentic, singling out Hellena Taylor (Yomiko), JB Blanc (Joker) and Jessica D. Stone (as J.D. Stone; Junior) - perhaps, not realising that both Taylor and Blanc hail from the UK. (Note: Taylor Interview, undated. Taylor: "I was born and bred in England, on the Berkshire/Surrey border. After that I lived in London and trained at LAMDA (London Academy of Music and Dramatic Art)...") (Note: The Independent, 2007: "Mr Blanc, a coach, actor and director who grew up in rural North Yorkshire, has led the young actors on an unusual training scheme [...] [and] used Wallace and Gromit to explain to the American cast [of The History Boys] how their mouths would have to move to pronounce Yorkshire vowels.") (Note: On the other hand, Stone is from Agua Dulce, California.)

Way Jeng of Mania argued that Hunter MacKenzie Austin (as Michelle) was consistent from volume to volume, filled with "very memorable [...] energy and enthusiasm" while Sara Lahti (as Maggie) was the "most difficult [performance] to judge of the three main sisters," largely because of Maggie's introverted nature. Except, he noted Lahti's strength as she was able "to keep Maggie understated without simultaneously making her a dead and lifeless character." He cited that Rachel Hirschfeld (as Anita) was "excellent," saying she "has an uncanny ability to deliver her lines" naturally, concluding that her "crying at the end of episode five [is] the highlight." He further stated that Wendy Tomson's Nenene was "one of the weaker [performances] in the series" due to clumsy word inflections when paired with the sisters, and dictated that J.D. Stone (as Junior) was "satisfactory with no exceptional strengths or weaknesses;" granted, it took him several episodes to realize that the character was a pre-teen boy.

Later in the show, Jeng pointed out that Tomson's vocal performance improved, and her "stubborn streak comes across beautifully." Siobhan Flynn was able to convey Wendy's complex facets convincingly, and at a plot turn, she "re-invent[ed] the character [by] show[ing] a part of Wendy that we haven't seen up to this point." He opinionated that in volume four, JB Blanc (as Joker) delivered "one of the most appealing performances in the dub" which was "soft [with] a subtle edge." Hellena Taylor (credited as Helena Taylor) was praised for her portrayal of Yomiko's "absent-minded qualities" contrasted with her dramatic moments while Carrie Savage's Nancy displayed "a wide emotional range." "[T]he real prize [of Savage]," Jeng added, was her "gentle warmth" when interacting with Junior, "which compliments [his] confusion and usual standoffish demeanor."

By volumes five and six, Jeng said that Hirschfeld's Anita and Blanc's Joker ranked "among the best in the cast" while Blanc and Flynn shared notable chemistry as "urbane villains, heartless [...] and always driven to succeed." On the other hand, he noted that Nancy's "relationship with Junior is less clear" in later episodes, therefore there was "less warmth." Despite this, he singled out the emotion in Nancy's and Junior's verbal fight. In volume seven, Jeng explained that because Nancy's "character has undergone some of the most dramatic changes" from vulnerable to self-possessed, Savage's performance "reflects that change [and] range." Likewise, Blanc's Joker "never feels overplayed, [making] him an extremely compelling villain." On a critical note, Jeng thought Stone's interpretation of Junior ranged from "somewhere between fair and good," mainly because his angst wasn't quite as "pronounced, but there's some very good work towards the end of the disc."

In the U.S., some of the cast earned individual Anime Dub Recognition (ADR) Awards by the anime magazine/website Dub Review (before the publication folded in mid 2007), including Rachel Hirschfeld, Wendy Tomson, JB Blanc, Helena Taylor, and Hunter MacKenzie Austin.

Assessing the best anime dubs of 2004, Mark Abersold of Dub Review was one of many staff writers who granted New Generation Pictures with a Studio of the Year nod, writing: "Nobody quite matched the amount of care that New Gen put into their dubs. [...] It's difficult to think of any weakness [...] [when they] creat[ed] quality dubs for every title they received [such as R.O.D. the TV], regardless of the quality of the show itself." The show was further awarded Dub of the Year by the same publication. "This is a dub so well-constructed and so brilliantly realized," praised Dale Abersold, lauding the performances of the Paper Sisters, "[that] Hunter [Austin is] overwhelming[ly] [solicitous] as Michelle. I like Sara Lahti's quietness-but-not-quite-shyness as Maggie. And Rachel Hirschfeld is a perfect cheerful brat. And I like how they rise to the occasion in particularly emotional scenes: episode 5 was an early highlight of this." He added of the supporting roles: "[T]he villains, of which they are many [...] range from ranting to inscrutable to charming." He concluded: "As much as I enjoyed the original Japanese track of Read Or Die, I cannot imagine watching R.O.D. the TV in Japanese."

=== Awards and nominations ===
Year	Award	Category	Recipient	Result	Ref.
2004	Anime Dub Recognition (ADR) Awards	Actress of the Month (May)	Rachel Hirschfeld (Vol. 1)	Won	
2004	Anime Dub Recognition (ADR) Awards	Actress of the Month (December)	Wendy Tomson (Vol. 4)	Won	
2004	Anime Dub Recognition (ADR) Awards	Actor of the Month (December)	JB Blanc (Vol. 4)	Won	
2004	Anime Dub Recognition (ADR) Awards	Studio of the Year	New Generation Pictures	Won	
2004	Anime Dub Recognition (ADR) Awards	Dub of the Year	Ensemble	Won	
2005	Anime Dub Recognition (ADR) Awards	Actress of the Month (February)	Helena Taylor (Vol. 5)	Won	
2005	Anime Dub Recognition (ADR) Awards	Actress of the Month (June)	Hunter MacKenzie Austin (Vol. 7)	Won	

== Other media ==
- Dōjin game studio Easy Game Station created the side-scrolling video game ElePaper Action based on the series.
- The Three Paper Sisters appeared in the cross-over game Battle Moon Wars as enemies, renamed as Anipon, Maggipon and Mipon.
- Sony Music Entertainment Japan released a drama CD, R.O.D -THE CD- in 2004, marketed as "a slightly comical drama set in Nishihama Junior High School," which takes place after the TV series. (Note: R.O.D -THE CD-, Chapters 1-14. The first chapter opens with Okahara, one of Anita's classmates from the show, a minor character in the series, though he takes on a major role in the CD. He introduces the audience to the key players in comedic fashion, including a rather unimpressed Wendy and a clueless Joker. Chapter 2 depicts the opening theme and jumps straight into Chapter 3. Anita is now a second-year junior high school student (the equivalent to eighth grade in the U.S.; year seven in the U.K.) and gets into all sorts of shenanigans with Okahara, her "friendly" rival until the midpoint, Chapter 11. The plot shifts to Junior transferring to Anita's school, tagged closely by Nancy claiming she is a student. Joker makes his grand entrance in Chapter 13 where it is revealed that he plans to "politely convince" Junior to come back with him to England in order to rebuild the fallen Library, using Wendy and Okahara as tools to get to Junior.)
- In 2012, an alternate universe manga was released, R.O.D Rehabilitation, which recasts Yomiko as the villain of a dystopian world. (Note: Mantan Web, 2012. "[R.O.D Rehabilitation] is a completely new work written by Hideyuki Kurata with artwork by the young illustrator Fujichoko, who has attracted attention [online]. [...] Mr. Kurata says, 'Yomiko is a character [who was] created [to reflect] the positive side of love for books, but Yomi-meko [of the new manga] is the opposite of that, the dark side.'") Likewise, "Joker" is rewritten as the bibliophile hero. (Note: In the first chapter, a silver-haired Yomiko manifests from the pages of a rare book, which was claimed moments before for the mistress of a young girl in a maid uniform ("Wendy"). Wendy is quickly decapitated by another character, "Mary Bacon" who is attacked by Yomiko (leaving her to bleed out from an amputated limb). In the second chapter, a black-haired, wide-eyed Joker is introduced, sleeping on the streets of a city made of books, "Bibliopolis." Through a series of events, he joins forces with Yomiko.)
