= Read or Dream =

Japanese manga series

- Second tankōbon volume cover, featuring (from left to right) Michelle, Anita and Maggie
- Genre: Adventure, romance
- Manga
- Written by: Hideyuki Kurata
- Illustrated by: Ran Ayanaga
- Published by: Shueisha
- English publisher: NA: Viz Media
- Magazine: Ultra Jump
- Original run: October 19, 2002 – May 19, 2005
- Volumes: 4

Read or Dream (Note: Full title: R.O.D – Read or Dream: We are Paper Sisters Detective Company) is a Japanese manga series written by Hideyuki Kurata and illustrated by Ran Ayanaga. It was serialized in Shueisha's seinen manga magazine Ultra Jump from October 19, 2002, to May 19, 2005, with its chapters collected in four tankōbon volumes. In North America, the series was licensed for English release by Viz Media in 2006.

The "Paper Sisters Detective Company" consists of three young women who live in Hong Kong: Anita King, Michelle Cheung and Maggie Mui (they are not blood relations, but treat each other like sisters). Maggie, Michelle, and Anita are papermasters, meaning they can telekinetically manipulate paper to do anything they want, such as creating bulletproof shields and razor sharp swords. Their detective agency, which specializes in finding lost books (though they are often asked to find missing pets and do bodyguard duty as well), serves as the source of most of their adventures.

This series is set in the same universe as the manga series Read or Die, featuring a common antagonist to both series, the Dokusensha Corporation. Read or Die's protagonist Yomiko Readman also makes a cameo appearance.

The Paper Sisters and supporting character Hisami Hishiishi appear in the television series R.O.D the TV, but this series exists in a separate continuity than Read or Dream (differences include how the Sisters met Hisami and the origin of the Paper Sisters).

== Plot summary ==
Anita King, Michelle Cheung and Maggie Mui run the "Paper Sisters Detective Company" in Hong Kong. They serve a variety of clients, seeking lost books, pets, and even lost authors! Maggie and Michelle's expansive book budget often causes them to be out of money, and when they are not working they argue with Anita about how to maintain the apartment and eat.

In volume 1, the Paper Sisters help fix a romance by finding a lost book, find the Shangri-la of libraries, convince an alien not to destroy the world, help a girl with a serious illness find the courage to undergo a risky treatment, and battle the greatest horror of all horrors: cleaning their own apartment.

Volume 2 finds Anita on her own trying to help a client, only to discover that the client is a thief known as "Lily the Book Lover Extraordinaire" and Anita must fight her to get back what the thief has stolen; in another chapter, the sisters tell each other ghost stories, and in the final set of chapters, the Detective Company helps an author Yun Fat track down his favorite writer from his childhood.

In volume 3, Maggie finds a book which divides her psyche into 24 different personalities, and Michelle and Anita need to find a way to restore her; in another story, the Sisters argue about how to earn more money, and later, after they become successful, Michelle puts on too much weight, so her sisters try to force her to diet. Anita gets sick and Maggie takes care of her. Finally, Lily returns to threaten young Japanese author Hisami Hishishii, but fortunately Hisami has the Paper Sisters to protect her.

In the final volume, the Paper Sisters are brought to Japan to do more bodyguard work for Hisami, but end up first trying to "stage" a pretend first kiss for Hisami (with Anita as the unwilling "actor" playing Hisami's crush), and later, under her editor's instructions, try to protect Hisami from would-be suitors. The next story flashes back to how the Paper Sisters met: Dokusensha agents Maggie and Michelle were hired to help the company's genetic lab creation, Anita, to bring forth her powers. When Dokusensha tries to take Anita back, Maggie and Michelle take on Dokusensha's Hong Kong branch by themselves to rescue her from the evil corporation. The comic then returns to the present as several supporting characters' arcs are wrapped up, and Anita gets advice on the meaning of loving books from a mysterious spectacle-wearing bibliophile.

== Characters ==
The Sisters appear to be named after Michelle Yeoh, Anita Mui and Maggie Cheung, the stars of the classic Hong Kong action film The Heroic Trio. Alternatively, a possible reference is Hong Kong actress Michelle Reis, whose surname means "king" in Portuguese (her father being Portuguese).

Michelle Cheung
Michelle is the eldest sister at age 23. She considers herself the group leader, accepting missions and devising tasks for the Paper Sisters to undertake. Being the only legal adult in the family, she is Anita's legal guardian. She is much like Read or Die's Yomiko Readman in that she is naively carefree about many things, and she spends all the money she has, including the house money, to buy every book she comes across. Unlike Yomiko, however, she is very outgoing and talkative. She serves as a strong contrast to her other sisters, being talkative and peppy (unlike shy Maggie) and calm and collected (unlike spitfire Anita). She helps earn the sisters extra money (though quickly spends it) doing translation work; otherwise, Michelle is often lazy and needs to be coerced into helping around the house.
Michelle's paper mastery is focused on the creation of paper projectiles; most often she fires paper arrows with a paper longbow. These arrows are just as deadly as real ones, and Michelle can also twist them into different shapes to wrap around her targets. Michelle carries an aluminum case full of different kinds of paper for the Sisters to access during combat.
Maggie Mui
Maggie is the middle sister at age 19. Michelle describes her as "Big, Strong and Sharp!" She is shy and quiet, preferring to let her sisters speak for the group, although she will speak up if she feels she has something important to say. She, like her sister Michelle, loves books and little can distract her once she is absorbed in a book. She also loves small spaces (despite her large stature) and can often be found reading under a table or in a window sill. She tends to have a somewhat depressive nature, often questioning her value to her other two sisters (who quickly reassure her if they find she is upset). She is the sisters' primary cook. Maggie has very few friends, but does bond with a young blind girl named Faye whom Maggie encourages to get an operation so she can see again.
In combat, Maggie creates the strongest paper shields, and she can create paper "familiars" or marionettes to attack or defend as she wills. Her most common puppets include a wolf with great attack prowess, a strong golem which lifts heavy things and destroys obstacles, and a giant bird for transport.
Anita King
Anita is the youngest of the three sisters at age 12. Anita is brash and outspoken. She is also the most practical and is forever trying to get Maggie and Michelle to save some money for food. She also collects things with frogs on them, an obsession which is reinforced by her sisters' and other friends' various frog-related gifts to her. Unlike her sisters, she hates books, a dramatic difference from most other papermasters; Michelle says this is because Anita is going through a rebellious phase, though it may also have something to do with how Anita was "created" by Dokusensha, and because of a traumatic experience caused by a fire at the great library caused by Yomiko Readman. In volume 4, a "passing book lover" notes that if Anita truly had no interest in books, she wouldn't even bother to hate them, and notes that books have led her to her sisters and her dearest friends. Anita is good friends with Chihon and Hisami.
She is best at using paper to cut, able to slice through rocks and steel, and uses paper either up close as a blade or as a mid-range throwing weapon. Anita is also a very agile and skilled martial artist, often using her paper skills to supplement her impressive physical prowess.
Chihon
The sisters meet Chihon while he was looking for a mysterious library to return a book on behalf of his deceased grandfather. He later befriends Anita and helps her on numerous occasions; though they often have arguments they also care for one another. He aspires to be an author.
Mr. Tsai
A bookstore owner, Mr. Tsai aids the sisters many times, especially Anita.
Lily the Reader Extraordinaire
This young woman steals rare books, and gets Anita wrapped up in one of her book theft plots, and later tries to kidnap Hisami. Lily is often aggressively flirtatious towards Anita and Hisami. She keeps a pet panther named, "Orion."
Hisami Hishishii
Hisami is a 13-year-old author from Japan who befriends the Paper Sisters after they protect her from Lily. Anita and Hisami especially bond, particularly when Anita goes to school with Hisami in Japan. Hisami's classmate Tohru has a crush on her.

== Volume list ==
No.	Title	Original release date	English release date
1	Three Sisters - One Power	July 18, 2003; 4-08-876484-6	November 14, 2006; 1-4215-0510-X
2	The Clock Strikes	March 19, 2004; 4-08-876591-5	January 9, 2007; 1-4215-0511-8
3	Many Maggies	November 19, 2004; 4-08-876713-6	March 13, 2007; 1-4215-0862-1
4	The Last Chapter	August 19, 2005; 4-08-876847-7	May 8, 2007; 1-4215-0863-X

== Reception ==
The manga was positively received. Carlo Santos of Anime News Network gave the first volume a B−, saying that Read or Die had spy-thriller action, but this series is "gentle", more about "quirky flights of the imagination", but is primarily about "joy of books", poverty of someone with a career in literature and humanities. Santos criticized the writing as awkward, chessy, and cliche, and hopes that the second volume had stronger writing quality. Javier Lugo of Manga Life reviewed all four volumes, calling them heartwarming, haunting, funny, hilarious, and enjoyable, paired with a quality story of a series that is a "real gem." Caitlin Donnovan of The Mary Sue praised the manga for having "lighthearted fun" and a scene in which a girl "wants to kiss a main female character", with the protagonist fine with this.
