= Koji Masunari =

Japanese anime director

- 舛成孝二
- Born: January 1, 1965 (age 61); Shimane Prefecture
- Occupation: Anime director
- Years active: 1985–present
- Notable work: Kamichu!; Magi: The Labyrinth of Magic

Koji Masunari (Japanese: 舛成孝二, Hepburn: Masunari Kōji; born January 1, 1965) is a Japanese anime director. After debuting in 1985, he has directed many series, including the anime adaptation of Kamichu!, which won an excellence award at the Japan Media Arts Festival in 2005, the anime adaptation of Magi: The Labyrinth of Magic, and the anime adaptation of Blue Period.

== Biography ==
Koji Masunari was born in Shimane Prefecture on January 1, 1965. In 2005, Masunari directed the anime adaptation of Kamichu!, which was won the excellence award at the 2005 Japan Media Arts Festival. In 2012, he directed the anime adaptation of Magi: The Labyrinth of Magic, which was ranked by IGN as one of the best anime of the 2010s.

== Works ==
=== Television series ===
- Android Announcer Maico 2010 (1998) (director)
- Omishi Magical Theater: Risky Safety (臣士魔法劇場 リスキー☆セフティ, Omishi Mahou Gekijou: Risky/Safety) (1999–2000) (director)
- Kokoro Library (ココロ図書館, Kokoro Toshokan) (2001–2002) (director)
- R.O.D the TV (2003–2004)
- Kamichu! (かみちゅ!) (2005) (director)
- Magi: The Labyrinth of Magic (マギ, Magi) (2012–2014) (director)
- Blue Period (ブルーピリオド, Burū Piriodo) (2021) (chief director)

=== Original video animation ===
- Photon: The Idiot Adventures (フォトン) (1997–1999) (director)
- Read or Die (2001–2002) (director)

=== Films ===
- Welcome to the Space Show (宇宙ショーへようこそ, Uchū Shō e Yōkoso) (2010) (director)
- Trapezium (トラペジウム, Torapejiumu) (2024) (supervisor)
