= List of manga published by ASCII Media Works =

ASCII Media Works company logo

ASCII Media Works is a Japanese publishing company, which has published several manga series in its magazines. It is the result of a merger between ASCII Corporation and MediaWorks.

== 1990s ==
=== 1997 ===
- Battle Athletes
- Kurogane Communication

=== 1998 ===
- D4 Princess

=== 1999 ===
- Azumanga Daioh

== 2000s ==
=== 2000 ===
- Dokkoida?!
- Kanon
- Kokoro Library
- Ninin Ga Shinobuden
- Train+Train

=== 2001 ===
- Comic Party
- Gunparade March

=== 2002 ===
- Gunslinger Girl
- Strawberry Marshmallow

=== 2003 ===
- Hayate × Blade
- Ichigeki Sacchu!! HoiHoi-san
- Junk Force
- Muv-Luv
- Shingetsutan Tsukihime
- Yotsuba&!

=== 2004 ===
- Bludgeoning Angel Dokuro-Chan
- Blue Drop
- Indian Summer
- Iono-sama Fanatics
- Kagihime Monogatari Eikyū Alice Rondo
- Kashimashi: Girl Meets Girl
- Muv-Luv Unlimited

=== 2005 ===
- Blood Alone
- Ef: A Fairy Tale of the Two.
- Kemeko Deluxe!
- Menacing Dog's
- Missing: Kamikakushi
- Murder Princess
- Shakugan no Shana
- Strawberry Panic!
- Tsuki wa Higashi ni Hi wa Nishi ni: Operation Sanctuary
- Utawarerumono
- Venus Versus Virus
- Yoake Mae yori Ruriiro na
- Yuri Seijin Naoko-san

=== 2006 ===
- Bludgeoning Angel Dokuro-chan Ripiru
- Lillia and Treize
- Little Busters! The 4-koma
- Nanatsuiro Drops
- Nogizaka Haruka no Himitsu
- Shina Dark
- Tori Koro

=== 2007 ===
- A Certain Scientific Railgun
- Clannad
- Da Capo II: Imaginary Future
- Fortune Arterial Character's Prelude
- Gurren Lagann
- HoneComi The 4-koma
- Ichigeki Sacchu!! HoiHoi-san Legacy
- Iriya no Sora, UFO no Natsu
- Little Busters!
- Lotte no Omocha!
- Marriage Royale
- Muv-Luv Alternative
- My-Otome Saga: Ryū to Otome no Namida
- Nanatsuiro Drops Pure!!
- Our Home's Fox Deity.
- Shakugan no Shana X Eternal song: Harukanaru Uta
- Spice and Wolf
- Toradora!
- Toshokan Sensō Spitfire!
- Twinkle Crusaders
- Utawarerumono Chiri Yuku Mono e no Komori Uta

=== 2008 ===
- Amnesia Labyrinth
- Asura Cryin'
- Hime Navi/Hime Navi Evolution
- Jinki -Shinsetsu-
- Ohime-sama Navigation
- Puchimas! Petit Idolmaster
- S.L.H Stray Love Hearts!
- Sharin no Kuni, Himawari no Shōjo
- Persona 4
- World Destruction: Futari no Tenshi
- Twinkle Crusaders
- Utawarerumono
- White Album

=== 2009 ===
- Angel Beats! The 4-koma: Bokura no Sensen Kōshinkyoku
- Heavy Object
- Hyakka Ryōran: Sengoku Maidens
- Sora Kake Girl D
- Little Busters! Ecstasy: Saya Tokido School Revolution
- Marriage Royale: Prism Story
- Muv-Luv Alternative: Total Eclipse
- Oreimo
- Queen's Blade Struggle
- Twinkle Crusaders GoGo!
- Sword Art Online

== 2010s ==
=== 2010 ===
- Accel World
- Amagami: Love Goes On!
- Angel Beats! Heaven's Door
- Gakuen Kino
- Kud Wafter
- Little Busters! Ecstasy: Sasami Sasasegawa Black Cat Fantasia
- Little Busters! EX The 4-koma
- Ōkami Kakushi: Fukahi no Shō
- Rewrite: Side-B
- Ro-Kyu-Bu!
- Sound of the Sky
- Uta no☆Prince-sama♪

=== 2011 ===
- Baby Princess
- Golden Time
- Heavy Object S
- Horizon in the Middle of Nowhere
- Kamikaze Explorer!
- La storia della Arcana Famiglia
- Little Busters! Ecstasy: Kanata Futaki My Minroud
- Love, Election and Chocolate
- Love, Election and Chocolate SLC
- Mimic Royal Princess
- Ore no Kōhai ga Konna ni Kawaii Wake ga Nai
- The Pet Girl of Sakurasou
- Photo Kano: Sweet Snap
- Qualia the Purple
- Rewrite: Side-R
- Rewrite: Okaken Blog
- Ro-Kyu-Bu! Yonkoma

=== 2012 ===
- Accel World / Dural: Magisa Garden
- Black Bullet
- Brothers Conflict Purupuru
- Da Capo III
- Daitoshokan no Hitsujikai
- Daitoshokan no Hitsujikai: Lovely Librarians
- The Devil Is a Part-Timer!
- Guilty Crown: Dancing Endlaves
- Hataraku Maō-sama! High School!
- Ima Sugu Oniichan ni Imōto da tte Iitai!
- Kyōkaisen-jō no Horako-san
- Little Busters! Ecstasy Heartful
- Little Busters! End of Refrain
- Log Horizon Gaiden: Honey Moon Logs
- Love Live!
- Mahōka Kōkō no Yūtōsei
- Persona 4: The Magician
- Persona x Detective Naoto
- Ro-Kyu-Bu! Halftime
- Strike the Blood
- Uta no☆Prince-sama♪Debut
- Vividred Operation: The 4-koma Viviop
- Waiting in the Summer

=== 2013 ===
- A Certain Scientific Accelerator
- Angel Beats! The 4-koma: Osora no Shinda Sekai kara
- Etotama
- Kakumei Club Valvra-bu
- Kamikaze Explorer!
- KanColle: Shimakaze Whirlwind Girl
- Nagi-Asu: A Lull in the Sea
- Nagi no Asukara 4-koma Gekijō: Nagiyon
- Valvrave the Liberator: Uragiri no Rakuin
- Valvrave the Liberator: Ryūsei no Valkyrie
- Vividred Operation

=== 2014 ===
- Buddy Complex
- Buddy Complex: Coupling of Battlefield
- Celestial Method
- Girl Friend (Kari): Chloe Lemarie-hen ~Chole to Nihon to Mirai no Tobira~
- Girl Friend (Kari): Murakami Fumio-hen ~Secret Smile~
- Girl Friend (Kari): Sakurai Akane-hen ~Kokoro o Komete, Yūki no On Air!~
- Girl Friend (Kari) ~Seiō Gakuen Girl's Diary~
- Girl Friend (Kari): Shiina Kokomi-hen ~Koishite Madonna~
- KanColle: The perched naval base
- Love Live! School Idol Diary
- Mahōka Kōkō no Rettōsei: Tsuioku-hen
- Shirobako: Kaminoyama Kōkō Animation Dōkōkai
- Washio Sumi wa Yūsha de Aru
- Yūki Yūna wa Yūsha-bu Shozoku
- Yūki Yūna wa Yūsha de Aru

=== 2015 ===
- Heavy Object A
- Star-Mu

=== 2019 ===
- Adachi and Shimamura
- I Can't Believe I Slept With You!
- I Got a Cheat Skill in Another World and Became Unrivaled in the Real World, Too
- In the Land of Leadale
- Rebuild World
- Zatsu Tabi: That's Journey

== Unsorted ==
- Futakoi Alternative
- Wind: A Breath of Heart
