= Dengeki Daioh =

Japanese manga magazine

- Cover of the August 2001 issue of Dengeki Daioh featuring Chiyo and Sakaki from Azumanga Daioh. Illustration by Kiyohiko Azuma.
- Categories: Shōnen manga
- Frequency: Monthly
- Circulation: 130,000 (2014)
- Publisher: MediaWorks (1994–2008); ASCII Media Works (2008–present)
- First issue: April 18, 1994
- Country: Japan
- Based in: Tokyo
- Language: Japanese
- Website: https://daioh.dengeki.com/

Monthly Comic Dengeki Daioh (月刊コミック電撃大王, Gekkan Komikku Dengeki Daiō) is a Japanese shōnen manga magazine published by ASCII Media Works (formerly MediaWorks) under the Dengeki brand. Many manga serialized in Dengeki Daioh were later published in tankōbon volumes under ASCII Media Works' Dengeki Comics imprint. The magazine is sold every month on the 27th. A yonkoma section of Dengeki Daioh called Dengeki Yonkoma Daioh (電撃4コマ大王) features various omake strips of the manga series published in it. The format is typically a normal drawing on the right side featuring one or sometimes more characters, and a vertical four panel strip on the left featuring characters from the associated series in super deformed form. Two special editions of the magazine called Dengeki Moeoh and Dengeki Daioh Genesis are sold bimonthly and quarterly, respectively.

The publication originated from Bandai's Cyber Comix magazine, which later became the short-lived Media Comix Dyne — it lasted three issues. After the publication of Media Comix Dyne was canceled, MediaWorks launched Dengeki Daioh as a quarterly publication in 1994. It eventually developed into a bimonthly magazine in 1996, and later into a monthly publication when its name was changed to its current title, Monthly Comic Dengeki Daioh. In recent years, the magazine has taken to publishing information on anime and video games as well where half the magazine contains such information. Dengeki Daioh celebrated its thirteenth year of publication in 2007. Starting with the August 2008 issue, sold on June 27, 2008, Dengeki Daioh increased the number of manga series serialized in each issue which expanded the page count from about 700 to 900 pages per issue.

== Serialized titles ==
=== In Dengeki Daioh ===
Title	Author	Illustrator	First issue	Last issue
Adachi to Shimamura 安達としまむら (Adachi to Shimamura)	Hitoma Iruma	Yuzuhara Moke	May 2019	Ongoing
Amagoi 雨乞	Teika Kobato		2009	2012
Angel Foyson	Kōbō Shibusawa		2000	2005
Ani to Imōto no Shitaishi Tai Shitai Koto 兄と妹のしたいしたいしたいコト	Hano Haruka		February 2022	Ongoing
Ano Natsu de Matteru あの夏で待ってる	Ichika	Pepako Dokuta	March 2012	February 2013
Asura Cryin' アスラクライン (Asura Kurain)	Gakuto Mikumo	Ryō Akizuki	November 2008	September 2010
Azumanga Daioh あずまんが大王 (Azumanga Daiō)	Kiyohiko Azuma		February 1999	June 2002
Blood Alone	Masayuki Takano		February 2005	2010
Bloom Into You やがて、君になる (Yagate, Kimi ni Naru)	Nio Nakatani		May 2015	September 2019
A Certain Scientific Dark Matter とある科学の未元物質(ダークマター) (Toaru Kagaku no Dāku Matā)	Kazuma Kamachi	Nankyoku Kisaragi	August 2019	March 2020
A Certain Scientific Railgun とある科学の超電磁砲 (Toaru Kagaku no Railgun)	Kazuma Kamachi	Motoi Fuyukawa	May 2007	March 2026
A Certain Scientific Railgun: Astral Buddy とある科学の超電磁砲(レールガン)外伝 アストラル・バディ (Toaru Kagaku no Railgun Gaiden: Astral Buddy)	Kazuma Kamachi	Yasuhito Nogi	April 2017	July 2020
Chō Kankaku Analman 超感覚ANALマン	Kōichirō Yasunaga		1993	December 1999
Chōjō Kidō Siren 超常機動サイレーン	Yūji Ihara		August 2004	September 2007
Chronos Hayes クロノスヘイズ (Kuronosu Heizu)	Masayuki Takano		2001	2003
D4 Princess; D4プリンセス (D4 Purinsesu)	Shōtarō Harada		1997	2000
Daddy's Sexy Dolls (Papa no Sexy Doll)	Gaku Kajikawa		2022	Ongoing
Danjo no Yūjō wa Seiritsu Suru? (Iya, Shinai!!) 男女の友情は成立する？（いや、しないっ!!）	Nana Nanana	Kamelie	August 2021	Ongoing
Dark Whisper ダークウィスパー (Dāku Wisupā)	Ikuto Yamashita		May 2000	November 2003
DigiPara でじぱら (DejiPara)	Nobuyuki Takagi		October 2005	April 2010
Dengeki Momoe Scythe 電撃ももえサイズ	Shin'ichi Yūki		2004	2004
Dengeki Nekomimi Samurai 電撃ネコミミ侍	Akira Hakozaki		January 2007	April 2009
Dengeki Tenjikars 電撃テンジカーズ (Dengeki Tenjikāzu)	Ryoichi Koga		August 2006	December 2010
Deus X Makina デウスXマキナ	Wataru Karasuma		July 2008	December 2010
Doll Master	Yūji Ihara		September 1999	December 2003
Ef: A Fairy Tale of the Two.^{[A]}	Yū Kagami, Mikage	Juri Miyabi	June 2008	March 2015
Engeki Shōjo Inochi 演撃少女 命	Shizuru Hayashiya		1999	2000
Eromanga Sensei エロマンガ先生	Tsukasa Fushimi	Rin	May 27, 2014	May 27, 2021
Evergreen エバーグリーン	Yuyuko Takemiya	Akira Kasukabe	2011	2015
God Bless the Mistaken 神さまがまちガえる (Kami-sama ga Machigaeru)	Nio Nakatani		October 2021	Ongoing
Gun Driver ガンドライバー (Gan Doraibā)	Gō Bitō	Noriyasu Seta	1995	2001
Gurren Lagann^{[A]} 天元突破グレンラガン (Tengen Toppa Guren Ragan)	Kazuki Nakashima	Kotaro Mori	June 2008	July 2013
Gunslinger Girl	Yu Aida		May 21, 2002	September 27, 2012
Hayate X Blade^{[G]} はやて×ブレード (Hayate X Burēdo)	Shizuru Hayashiya		January 2004	July 2008
Himeyaka Hime-sama ヒメヤカヒメサマ	Shōtarō Harada		September 2006	2007
Hiyomama ひよママ	Etsuya Mashima		2006	2008
Horizon in the Middle of Nowhere 境界線上のホライゾン (Kyoukai Senjou no Horizon)	Minoru Kawakami	Hideo Takenaka	October 2011	May 2015
Horologium ホーロロギオン (Hōrorogion)	Jukki Hanada	Tatsu Nohana	March 2009	November 2010
Hyakkaryōran: Sengoku Otome 〜百花繚乱〜戦国乙女	Shirogumi	Yura Shinano	March 2009	March 2012
I Can't Believe I Slept With You! 一度だけでも、後悔してます。 (Ichido Dake Demo, Kōkai Shitemasu.)	Miyako Miyahara		August 2019	April 2021
I May Be a Guild Receptionist, But I'll Solo Any Boss to Clock Out on Time ギルドの受付嬢ですが、残業は嫌なのでボスをソロ討伐しようと思います (Guild no Uketsukejō desu ga, Zangyō wa Iya nanode Boss wo Solo Tōbatsu Shiyō to Omoimasu)	Mato Kousaka	Suzu Yūki	August 2021	Ongoing
Ichigeki Sacchu!! HoiHoi-san 一撃殺虫!!ホイホイさん	Kunihiko Tanaka			2004
Ignaju Crossgates Station The No.00 イグナクロス零号駅 (Iguna Kurosu Reigōeki)	Choco		2000	2012
Jinki: Shinsetsu^{[F]} JINKI-真説-	Shirō Tsunashima		May 2008	December 2008
Juggle ジャグリ (Jaguri)	Okito Endō		August 2009	October 2011
Kagihime Monogatari Eikyū Alice Rondo 鍵姫物語 永久アリス輪舞曲	Kaishaku		February 2004	July 2006
Kamichu! かみちゅ!	Koji Masunari		June 2005	January 2007
Kanna 神無	Takeru Kirishima		2001	2005
Kantai Collection: The perched naval base 艦隊これくしょん -艦これ- 止まり木の鎮守府	Hiroichi		July 2014	Ongoing
Kashin Fūjinjō^{[H]} 禍神風塵帖	Hiroyuki Utatane			Ongoing
Kaze no Sumika - Ginga Hyōjunji 風の住処 - 銀河標準時	Ikuto Yamashita		1994	April 1997
Kemeko Deluxe!^{[A]} ケメコデラックス! (Kemeko Derakkusu!)	Masakazu Iwasaki		October 2005	June 2011
Koikoi Seitokai こいこい★生徒会	Kanao Araki		January 2009	April 2013
Koi to Senkyo to Chocolate SLC 恋と選挙とチョコレートSLC (Koi to Senkyo to Chokorēto SLC)	Sprite	Waki Ikawa	May 2011	January 2014
Kokoro Library ココロ図書館 (Kokoro Toshokan)	Nobuyuki Takagi		April 2000	July 2002
Kurakura くらクラ	Hiroki Haritama		2005	2005
Kurogane Communication 鉄コミュニケイション	Hideo Kato	Tomomasa Takuma	1997	1999
Lythtis^{[C]}^{[H]} リスティス (Risutisu)	Hiroyuki Utatane		1995	Ongoing
Love Allergen ラブアレルゲン (Rabu Arerugen)	Satoru Akahori	Yukimaru Katsura	November 2009	April 2012
Mahōtsukai to Teishi no Futekisetsu na Kankei 魔法使い(♂)と弟子(♀)の不適切なカンケイ	Yukio Konya		June 2009	March 2011
Marine Attack マリンアタック (Marin Atakku)	Team Plus+	Wataru Karasuma	2007	2007
Mitsuboshi Colors 三ツ星カラーズ (Mitsuboshi Karāzu)	Katsuwo		2014	2020
Moriguchi Orito no Teiōgaku 森口織人の帝王学	Masaki Okayu	Rin Sanada	2008	2009
Muv-Luv Alternative マブラヴ オルタネイティヴ (Mabu Rabu Orutaneitivu)	âge	Azusa Makishima	October 2007	June 2017
Muv-Luv Alternative: Total Eclipse マブラヴ オルタネイティヴ トータル・イクリプス (Mabu Rabu Orutaneitivu Tōtaru Ikuripusu)	âge	Takashi Ishigaki	October 2009	2011
Na Na Na Na なななな	Shōtarō Harada		2003	2005
Ninin ga Shinobuden ニニンがシノブ伝	Ryōichi Koga		August 2000	March 2006
Noisy Girl ノイジィ・ガール (Noiji Gāru)	Hideyuki Kurata	Hanaharu Naruko	September 2008	Ongoing
Noritama のりタマ	Mahiro Ōtsuka		January 2010	December 2011
Not Lives ノットライヴス	Wataru Karasuma		August 2011	December 2016
Ōkami Kakushi: Fukahi no Shō おおかみかくし〜深緋の章〜	Konami	Mirura Yano	February 2010	March 2011
Ōoku Chakapon! 大奥チャカポン!	Maitake		June 2009	November 2010
Pretty Manizu ぷりてぃまにぃず (Puriti Manizu)	Shinsuke Kurihashi		August 2003	April 2005
Pure Mario Nation; PUREまりおねーしょん (PURE Mario Nēshon)	Nobuyuki Takagi		January 2003	July 2004
Qualia the Purple 紫色のクオリア (Murasaki-iro no Kuoria)	Hisamitsu Ueo	Shirō Tsunashima	March 2011	October 2013
Reborn as a Vending Machine, I Now Wander the Dungeon 自動販売機に生まれ変わった俺は迷宮を彷徨う (Jidōhanbaiki ni Umarekawatta Ore wa Meikyū ni Samayō)	Hirukuma	Kunieda	August 2021	Ongoing
Rewrite: Side-R	Key	Shūichi Kawakami	April 2011	September 2013
Sekiganjū Mitsuyoshi 隻眼獣ミツヨシ	Tetsurō Ueyama		2002	2005
Shakugan no Shana 灼眼のシャナ	Yashichiro Takahashi	Ayato Sasakura	April 2005	October 2011
Sharin no Kuni, Himawari no Shōjo 車輪の国、向日葵の少女	Akabeisoft2	Wataru Usami	July 2008	February 2011
Shina Dark: Kuroki Tsuki no Ō to Sōheki no Himegimi^{[E]} シャイナ・ダルク 〜黒き月の王と蒼碧の月の姫君〜	Bunjūrō Nakayama	Yukari Higa	April 2007	March 2009
Sister Red	Shizuru Hayashiya		2001	2003
Shingetsutan Tsukihime 真月譚 月姫	Type-Moon	Sasaki Shōnen	October 2003	September 2010
Sora Kake Girl D 宇宙をかける少女D (Sora o Kakeru Shōjo D)	Hajime Yatate	Kekocha	April 2009	January 2010
So Ra No Wo To ソ・ラ・ノ・ヲ・ト	Paradores	Yagi Shinba	January 2010	June 2011
Strawberry Marshmallow 苺ましまろ (Ichigo Mashimaro)	Barasui		April 2002	Ongoing
Sukashi Kashipan Man: Manzarademonai Daibōken スカシカシパンマン〜まんざらでもない大冒険〜	Arima Honda		September 2008	Ongoing
Taiyō no Shōjo Inka-chan 太陽の少女インカちゃん	Toshihiro Ono		July 1994	February 1998
Ticktack Gangan	Ryō Akizuki		2003	2003
Tokudane Sanmen Captors^{[B]} 特ダネ三面キャプターズ (Takudane Sanmen Kyaputāzu)	Hairan		August 2009	Ongoing
Tonari no Danna-sama となりのだんな様	Chiki Nonohara		2008	2008
Toradora!^{[A]} とらドラ!	Yuyuko Takemiya	Zekkyō	May 2008	Ongoing
Tori Koro MW-1056^{[D]}^{[H]} トリコロMW-1056	Hairan		June 2006	Hiatus
Toshokan Sensō Spitfire!^{[H]} 図書館戦争 SPITFIRE!	Hiro Arikawa	Yayoi Furudori	January 2008	June 2008
Train+Train	Hideyuki Kurata	Tomomasa Takuma	January 2000	May 2003
Twinkle Crusaders ティンクル☆くるせいだーす (Teinkuru Kuruseidāsu)	Lillian	Jin Arima	April 2008	August 2008
Twinkle Crusaders GoGo! ティンクル☆くるせいだーすGogo! (Teinkuru Kuruseidāsu)	Lillian	Hijiki	August 2009	October 2010
Uchūjin Plumber 宇宙人プルマー (Uchūjin Purumā)	Ukyō Takao		2000	2001
Venus Versus Virus^{[A]}	Atsushi Suzumi		May 2008	September 2008
Wagaya no Oinari-sama.^{[A]} 我が家のお稲荷さま。	Jin Shibamura	Suiren Shōfū	June 2008	May 2013
White Album	Aquaplus, Leaf	Chako Abeno	August 2008	2010
Yoiyami Gentō Sōshi 宵闇眩燈草紙	Tatsunosuke Yatsufusa		1999	2006
Yotsuba&! よつばと! (Yotsuba to!)	Kiyohiko Azuma		March 2003	Ongoing
Yuri Seijin Naoko-san 百合星人ナオコサン	Kashmir		May 2005	April 2014

=== In Dengeki Moeoh ===
- Dengeki!! Aegis 5
- Haru no Chū
- Koharubiyori
- Maromayu (spinoff of Paniponi)
- Nogizaka Haruka no Himitsu
- Omakase! Sayana no Moerobu
- Shōgakusei Sentai Petarikon
- Tenshi no 3P! no 3P!!
- Tōhō Kōrindō ~ Curiosities of Lotus Asia.
- Yumemitari na Hoshimatari na
- Yuriseijin Naoko-san
- Megami-sama no ai ga guigui kuru
- Hatsukoi, Tokimeki Usuihon

=== In Dengeki Teioh ===
- Hamuchu
- Iono-sama Fanatics
- Koharubiyori
- Kyōhaku Dog's
- Jigoku Gokuraku Tempest
- Lunch box
- Mattari-san
- Murder Princess
- Scape-God
- Shina Dark

== Special editions ==
Dengeki Moeoh April 2007 issue

Dengeki Moeoh
Dengeki Moeoh (電撃萌王, Dengeki Moeō) is a seinen manga magazine sold on the twenty-sixth of every other month; the magazine is a special edition version of Dengeki Daioh. It first went on sale on March 26, 2002, and was originally published quarterly. The magazine stopped publication with its sixteenth issue in December 2005 for three months. In March 2006, the magazine started to be published bimonthly. As of 2009, circulation was 50,000 copies.
Dengeki Teioh
Dengeki Teioh (電撃帝王, Dengeki Teiō) was a Japanese seinen manga magazine published by MediaWorks; the magazine was a special edition of Dengeki Daioh, which went on sale four times a year in January, April, July, and November on the twenty-sixth. The magazine was published between April 26, 2004, and November 26, 2006.
Comic Sylph
Comic Sylph (コミックシルフ, Komikku Shirufu; normally written as comic SYLPH) was a quarterly shōjo manga magazine, and first went on sale on December 9, 2006, as a special edition version of Dengeki Comic Gao!, but starting with the sixth volume on March 21, 2008, Comic Sylph became a special edition version of Dengeki Daioh. Comic Sylph was one of the few magazines originally published by MediaWorks not under the Dengeki naming line, such as with Dengeki Daioh, and Dengeki G's Magazine, the first of which being Active Japan in 1995 which was discontinued in 1998. Starting with the issue published on May 22, 2008, the magazine's title changed to simply Sylph (シルフ, Shirufu) and started to be published bimonthly as an independent magazine.
Dengeki Bunko Magazine
Dengeki Bunko Magazine (電撃文庫MAGAZINE) is a seinen light novel magazine published bimonthly which originally began as a special edition of Dengeki Daioh. The magazine was first published on December 10, 2007, as the successor of Dengeki hp, but from the third issue on, published on April 10, 2008, the magazine became independent of Dengeki Daioh.
Dengeki Daioh G
Comic Dengeki Daioh G (コミック電撃だいおうじ, Komikku Dengeki Dai Ōji; normally written as Comic Dengeki Daioh "g") is a monthly shōnen manga magazine that serializes four-panel manga. The magazine was launched on September 27, 2013.

== Notes ==
- ^{A} These manga were transferred from Dengeki Comic Gao!.
- ^{B} This manga was transferred from Houbunsha's Manga Time Lovely.
- ^{C} This manga was transferred from Comptiq.
- ^{D} This manga was transferred from Manga Time Kirara.
- ^{E} This manga was transferred from Dengeki Daioh's special edition Dengeki Teioh.
- ^{F} This manga was transferred from Comic Blade.
- ^{G} This manga was transferred to Ultra Jump.
- ^{H} These manga are on hiatus.
