= Suzunone Seven! =

Japanese visual novel

- Suzunone Seven! original visual novel cover

スズノネセブン！ (Suzunonesebun!)
- Genre: Romance, Harem, Fantasy
- Video game
- Developer: Clochette
- Publisher: Clochette (PC); Alchemist (PS2, PSP)
- Genre: Eroge, Visual novel
- Platform: Windows, PlayStation Portable, PlayStation 2
- Released: JP: January 30, 2009 (Windows); JP: May 27, 2010 (PS2); JP: January 30, 2014 (PSP)
- Manga

Suzunone Seven! - Rebirth Knot
- Written by: Clochette
- Illustrated by: Atera
- Published by: Kadokawa Shoten
- Magazine: Comp Ace
- Original run: June 2010 – August 2010
- Video game

Suzunone Seven! -Sweet Lovers' Concerto-
- Developer: Clochette
- Publisher: Clochette
- Genre: Eroge, Visual novel
- Platform: Windows
- Released: November 27, 2009

Suzunone Seven! (スズノネセブン！, Suzunonesebun!), or otherwise known as Suzunone7, is a Japanese visual novel developed and published by Clochette. The PC game was officially released on January 30, 2009, rated for ages 18 and over. On May 27, 2010, the game was made available on PlayStation 2, entitled Suzunone Seven! - Rebirth Knot (スズノネセブン! - Rebirth Knot, Suzunonesebun! - Ribasu Knot), published by Alchemist as an all ages game. The PlayStation 2 version includes additional heroines. The game was later ported to PlayStation Portable on January 30, 2014, which is also rated for all ages. A fan disc called Suzunone Seven! -Sweet Lovers' Concerto- (スズノネセブン！ -Sweet Lovers’Concerto-, Suzunonesebun! -Suito Lovers' Koncheruto-) was released on November 27, 2009. The fan disc is restricted to ages 18 and over.

A manga based on the PlayStation 2 port, called Suzunone Seven! - Rebirth Knot, was serialized in the Comp Ace magazine.

== Gameplay ==
The gameplay of Suzunone Seven offers branching plot lines and a multi-choice navigation. The player assumes the role of Yukimura Kido, who is the main protagonist of the game. Kido can end up with any of the four heroines presented in the game, and in the PC version of the game, he may sexually interact with the heroines, unlike in the all ages version. The four datable heroines are Nonomura Nino, Takatori Yuzuri, Mitsumine Minato, and Daikanyama Sumire. Most time spent playing the game is spent simply reading dialogue and inner thoughts of Kido in the text box on the bottom of the screen.

== Plot ==
The story of Suzunone Seven! takes place in a world where magic is established as one of the energies. There is a prestige school called Suzunone Magic School, which has many talented pupils capable of magic, however, there are also dropout students, and the worst seven students are forced to contribute to a studying camp called the Suzunone Trial. There, they will take exams and whoever does the worst will be expelled from school.

== Characters ==
=== Main characters ===
- Yukimura Kido - The main protagonist of the game.
- Nonomura Nino

Voiced by
Himari (PC), Maki Tomonaga (PS2, PSP)
A girl with a positive, high spirited personality.

- Takatori Yuzuri

Voiced by
Kōri Natsuno (PC), Hiroko Taguchi (PS2, PSP)
A girl who is taking part of the trial due to her high temper.

- Mitsumine Minato

Voiced by
Mio Okawa (PC), Maki Kobayashi (PS2, PSP)
Kido's childhood friend.

- Daikanyama Sumire

Voiced by
Rumiko Sasa (PC), Sayaka Aoki (PS2, PSP)
A girl with a shy personality.

=== Minor characters ===
- Mitsumine Shin

Voiced by
Renaissance Yamada
A close friend of Kido and the brother of Minato.

- Daikanyama Toshiro

Voiced by
Jinpachi Nagakura (PC), Tomoyoshi Fukatsu (PS2, PSP)
The forerunner of Suzunone Magic School.

- Nonomura Nano - Nino's mother.

== Related Media ==
=== Books ===
A visual fan book for Suzunone Seven! was released in July 2009. The book contains full-color illustrations of the various characters, and a world guide. The book was published by Max.

=== Manga ===
A manga based on the PS2 release of the game, called Suzunone Seven! - Rebirth Knot, was serialized in Kadokawa Shoten's Comp Ace magazine from June to August in 2010. Atera illustrated the 3-chapter manga.

== Reception ==
On Getchu, a major re distributor of anime domestic products, Suzunone Seven! ranked 22nd in sales of January 2009, the month of the game's official release. In the ranking sales of February 2009, Suzunone Seven!'s rank rose to 15th place. In the entirety of 2009 sales, Suzunone Seven! came 44th. Getchu also awarded Suzunone Seven! 2nd place for recommended visual novels in January 2009, The fan disc, Suzunone Seven! -Sweet Lovers' Concerto-, also came 2nd place in November 2009.

== See also ==
- Kamikaze Explorer!
