= Himari =

Name list

- Pronunciation: çi.mä.ɾi
- Gender: Female

Origin
- Origin: Japanese
- Meaning: Different meanings depending on the kanji used
- Region of origin: Japan

Himari (Japanese: ひまり, ヒマリ) is a feminine Japanese given name.

== People with the name ==
- Himari Satō (born 2002), Japanese tennis player
- Himari Tsukishiro, Japanese idol
- Himari Yoshimura, Japanese violinist

== Fictional characters ==
- Himari Kino, fictional character from Whisper Me a Love Song
- Himari Noihara, fictional character from Omamori Himari
- Himari Uehara, fictional character from the BanG Dream! franchise
