= Kamichu! =

Japanese anime television series

- Cover of the first Japanese DVD, showing from left to right Mitsue, Yurie, and Matsuri

かみちゅ！
- Genre: Fantasy, slice of life
- Created by: Bésame Mucho; Koji Masunari; Hideyuki Kurata; Tomonori Ochikoshi
- Anime television series
- Directed by: Koji Masunari
- Produced by: Tomonori Ochikoshi; Saeko Matsuda (1–3); Atsushi Kaji (4–16)
- Written by: Hideyuki Kurata
- Music by: Yoshihiro Ike
- Studio: Brain's Base
- Original network: Animax, TV Asahi
- English network: PH: Animax
- Original run: June 28, 2005 – September 27, 2005
- Episodes: 16 (12 TV, 4 DVD only)
- Manga
- Written by: Hanaharu Naruko
- Published by: MediaWorks
- Magazine: Dengeki Daioh
- Original run: June 2005 – January 2007
- Volumes: 2
- icon

Kamichu! (かみちゅ！), short for Kamisama de Chūgakusei (かみさまでちゅうがくせい; lit. 'A Deity As a Middle School Student'), is a Japanese anime television series. Influenced by Shinto, it follows the adventures of teenage goddess Yurie Hitotsubashi and her friends. The series was created by Besame Mucho (ベサメムーチョ, Besamemūcho), which is the joint pen name of producer Tomonori Ochikoshi, director Koji Masunari, and writer Hideyuki Kurata. It was broadcast by the anime television network Animax on its respective networks worldwide, including Japan, East Asia, South Asia, and Southeast Asia, where it received its first English-language broadcast. Kamichu! was adapted as a manga serialized in the shōnen manga magazine Dengeki Daioh and collected into two tankōbon volumes.

In July 2008, Geneon Entertainment and Funimation announced an agreement to distribute select titles in North America. Although Geneon still retained the license, Funimation would assume exclusive rights to the manufacturing, marketing, sales and distribution of select titles. Kamichu! was one of several titles involved in the deal, but in August 2011, the rights to the series had expired.

== Story ==
Kamichu! is set in spring 1983 until 1984, in the city of Onomichi, Hiroshima Prefecture, on the shores of Japan's Inland Sea. Many of the temples and landmarks shown in the anime are real locations in the city.

Yurie Hitotsubashi is a shy ordinary middle school girl who suddenly discovers that she has become a kami, a goddess in the Shinto sense, overnight. She has no idea what sort of goddess she is or what her powers are. Her friends give her the nickname Kamichu, a portmanteau of kami (神; "god") and chūgakusei (中学生; "middle school student"). Yurie meets many other divinities and spirits, while learning the ways of the gods become a great goddess herself. During the course of the series, she learns about being a better goddess as a person.

== Characters ==
Yurie Hitotsubashi (一橋 ゆりえ, Hitotsubashi Yurie)
Voiced by: Mako (Japanese); Megan Harvey (English)
Yurie is the protagonist of the series. In the first episode, she tells her best friend Mitsue that overnight she has become a goddess; how or why this became so is never further explained. She is remarkably naïve and simple-minded, but always has the best intentions. Yurie has a crush on Kenji Ninomiya for a long time and gets embarrassed around him. Whenever she exercises her divine powers, her hair grows long and she often falls asleep afterwards due to the taxing effort involved.
Matsuri Saegusa (三枝 祀, Saegusa Matsuri)
Voiced by: Rika Morinaga (Japanese); Stephanie Sheh (English)
Matsuri is the person in charge of the Raifuku Shrine in Onomichi. She runs the shrine with her sister, Miko, and their widowed father, the chief priest. Matsuri is always thinking of schemes to earn money for the shrine or attract more visitors to it, usually through exploiting Yurie's newfound divinity.
Mitsue Shijo (四条 光恵, Shijō Mitsue)
Voiced by: Kaori Mine (Japanese); Erika Weinstein (English)
Mitsue is Yurie's down-to-earth best friend. She serves as the "straight man" for her friends, but wishes that her life were more exciting. Yurie often goes to her for advice, which is simple common sense that is always right. She is usually possessed by Yashima when he needs to communicate with people or when he wants to play the guitar.
Miko Saegusa (三枝 みこ, Saegusa Miko)
Voiced by: Ai Nonaka (Japanese); Rachel Hirschfeld (English)
Miko is Matsuri's shy younger sister. She does the cooking in the house, and is very polite and respectful to everyone. She helps out in the shrine and has the ability to see spirits. She has a crush on the shrine's god, Yashima, whom she often speaks with. Her name, Miko, is also the term for a Shinto shrine attendant.
Kenji Ninomiya (二宮 健児, Ninomiya Kenji)
Voiced by: Issei Miyazaki (Japanese); Johnny Yong Bosch (English)
Kenji is president and only member of his school's calligraphy club. He is quiet, aloof, and rather slow on the uptake. Kenji loves his brushes and often does calligraphy for the Raifuku shrine. He only does calligraphy when he is "inspired", but it takes him a while to realize that most of his sources of inspiration revolve around Yurie, who has an intense crush on him. At the end of the anime, Kenji becomes Yurie's boyfriend.
Yashima (八島様, Yashima-sama)
Voiced by: Kōsuke Okano (Japanese); Yuri Lowenthal (English)
Yashima is the local kami of the Raifuku shrine. He wishes to be a rock star, so he often possesses Mitsue (who is totally against this) to fulfill his dream. Yashima is also often seen with an Akita Inu that talks. He seems to be close friends with Miko Saegusa, but it is implied that he is more interested in her sister, Matsuri.
Shōkichi Hitotsubashi (一橋 章吉, Hitotsubashi Shōkichi)
Voiced by: Makoto Tsumura (Japanese); J.D. Stone (English)
Shōkichi is Yurie's younger brother who likes Miko and attends the same school as his older sister, only one grade below. He often acts more mature than his sister and often teases her, but they love each other. Shōkichi has a crush on Miko and blushes whenever he is around her.
Kiyomi Noto (ノート 清美, Noto Kiyomi)
Voiced by: Ryō Hirohashi (Japanese); Lily Mason (English)
Kiyomi is a girl younger than Yurie, Matsuri, and Mitsue, who is also in love with Kenji.
Ukaru Nishimura (西村 ウカル, Nishimura Ukaru)
Voiced by: Yuki Kaida (Japanese); Lucian Lee (English)
Ukaru is a male student at Yurie's school who was competing for student council.
Bin-chan (貧乏神(貧ちゃん), Binbō-gami)
Bin-chan is a poverty god Yurie takes in after he saves Tama's life. He shares Tama's body.
Tama Hitotsubashi (一橋 タマ, Hitotsubashi Tama)
Voiced by: Chiwa Saitō (Japanese); Carrie Savage (English)
Tama is Yurie's pet cat. After Tama began to share her body with Bin-chan, she exhibits a number of human traits which make Shoukichi suspicious.
Akane Hitotsubashi (一橋 あかね, Hitotsubashi Akane) and Kenkichi Hitotsubashi (一橋 憲吉, Hitotsubashi Kenkichi)
Akane Voiced by: Miki Itō (Japanese); Karen Thompson (English)
Kenkichi Voiced by: Mitsuaki Hoshino (Japanese); Talis Axelrod (English)
Yurie and Shōkichi's parents.
Ino, Shika, Chō
Ino Voiced by: Yukie Maeda (Japanese); Sam Riegel (English)
Shika Voiced by: Kanako Hattori (Japanese); Liam O'Brien (English)
Chō Voiced by: Misato Fukuen (Japanese); Hunter MacKenzie Austin (English)
The three tiny spirits that the God Association sends to Yurie as her assistants. Their names are puns, as they were given by Yurie for unrelated reasons but correspond to the animals that they resemble. Chō is a butterfly, Ino is a boar, and Shika is a deer. "Ino-Shika-Chou" is also a winning hand in the card game Hanafuda.

== Media ==
=== Anime ===
On July 3, 2008, Geneon Entertainment and Funimation announced an agreement to distribute select titles in North America. While Geneon Entertainment still retained the license, Funimation would assume exclusive rights to the manufacturing, marketing, sales and distribution of select titles. Kamichu! was one of several titles involved in the deal. However, as of August 2011, the rights to the series had expired.

No.	Title	Original release date
1	"The Mean Behavior of Youth"; Transliteration: "Seishun no Ijiwaru" (Japanese: 青春のいじわる)	June 29, 2005
When Yurie announces that she had become a god the previous night during lunchtime, Matsuri, as the daughter of a Shinto priest, tries to help her figure out what kind of god she is. During their efforts, Yurie accidentally creates a typhoon, which she has to dispel to save Kenji.
2	"Please God"; Transliteration: "Kami-sama Onegai" (Japanese: 神様お願い)	July 6, 2005
Matsuri decides her family's Raifuku Shrine will host a festival in honour of Yurie, only to discover that Yashima, the god of the shrine, has gone missing. Yurie travels to the land of the gods to convince him to return.
3	"I Didn't Mean it" Transliteration: "Sonna Tsumori ja Nakatta no ni" (Japanese: そんなつもりじゃなかったのに)	July 13, 2005
The God of Poverty arrives in town, sending the local economy into a depression. When Yurie's pet cat, Tama, goes missing, the God of Poverty ends up sharing Tama's body.
4	"Earth's Crisis"; Transliteration: "Chikyū no Kiki" (Japanese: 地球の危機)	July 27, 2005
The Gods Association sends Yurie three spirit assistants to help her deal with petitions. As her first task, the prime minister summons Yurie to help communicate with a Martian.
5	"I Don't Like Being Alone"; Transliteration: "Hitoribotchi wa Kirai" (Japanese: ひとりぼっちは嫌い)	August 3, 2005
Yurie catches a cold and stays at home for a few days, but her friends do not come to visit. Feeling lonely, she uses her powers to leave her body as a spirit and visit them instead.
6	"A Small Decision"; Transliteration: "Chiisana Kesshin" (Japanese: 小さな決心)	August 10, 2005
A freshman named Kiyomi comes to Yurie seeking love advice, but the object of her crush is Kenji. Trying earnestly as a good goddess to help her rival anyway, Yurie joins Kenji's calligraphy club with her.
7	"Lovers of the Sun"; Transliteration: "Taiyō no Koibito-tachi" (Japanese: 太陽の恋人たち)	August 24, 2005
During the summer holiday, Yurie and her friends go to a quiet part of the seashore and explore an abandoned beach house. The gods living there want to know what has become of the people who once enjoyed themselves there, and Yurie fulfills their wish.
8	"Wild Times"; Transliteration: "Yasei Jidai" (Japanese: 野生時代)	N/A
Multiple cats have been roaming the town recently, with Tama being among them. Yurie follows her and turns into a cat to meet the charismatic feline, Tyler Meowden (an homage to Tyler Durden), who wants to revolt against humans. She and Tama fight to stop him.
9	"Crossing the River of Time"; Transliteration: "Toki no Kawa o Koete" (Japanese: 時の河を越えて)	August 31, 2005
Yurie and her friends meet an old man named Gen who was once a crewman of the Japanese battleship Yamato. Shortly afterwards, she receives a message from the sunken battleship, which wants to visit its home port again.
10	"I Choose You"; Transliteration: "Kimi ni Kettei" (Japanese: 君に決定)	September 7, 2005
As another part of her business, Matsuri convinces Yurie to run for student council president, but they encounter unexpectedly fervent opposition.
11	"Love is Missing"; Transliteration: "Koi wa Yukue Fumei" (Japanese: 恋は行方不明)	N/A
Miko and Shōkichi run away to a nearby town together for mysterious reasons. Yurie and her friends spend the day trying to find them.
12	"Mysterious Adventure"; Transliteration: "Fushigina Bōken" (Japanese: ふしぎなぼうけん)	September 14, 2005
For the month of Kannazuki, Yurie attends the "God Convention" in Izumo. While there, she temporarily transfers to a local middle school where everyone treats her with utmost respect.
13	"We Do As We Like"; Transliteration: "Yaritai Hōdai" (Japanese: やりたい放題)	N/A
Matsuri, a fervent Shintoist, becomes offended by the foreign holiday of Christmas and celebrates "Yurie-chan Thanksgiving Day" to fight it.
14	"Dream Colored Message"; Transliteration: "Yumeiro no Messēji" (Japanese: 夢色のメッセージ)	September 21, 2005
During her winter break from school, Yurie spends an entire day under the kotatsu. She receives several Nengajō (lit. 'New Year's cards'), including one from Kenji.
15	"A Small Step"; Transliteration: "Chiisana Ippo de" (Japanese: 小さな一歩で)	September 28, 2005
When Yurie resolves to give Kenji some Honmei choco for Valentine's Day and confess her love, the entire school and everyone in town pitches in to help her. After a brief and awkward conversation on the school's rooftop, the duo are lifted into the sky upon a large piece of paper (upon which Kenji had written the kanji for "love"). As they soar above the town, Kenji tells Yurie that he loves her, because she is strange. The character on the flying paper turns into the kanji for 'strange'.
16	"Hey, Spring Has Come"; Transliteration: "Hora ne, Haru ga Kita" (Japanese: ほらね、春が来た)	N/A
Yurie and Mitsue help Matsuri and Miko clean the shrine storage rooms. As she spends the night there, Yurie tells her friends that Kenji is her boyfriend.

=== Manga ===
Kamichu! was adapted as a manga serialized by MediaWorks in Dengeki Daioh, a shōnen manga magazine, and collected in two tankōbon volumes. There are fourteen episodes plus one short episode in the manga series. Four long episodes consist of two parts (02+03, 04+05, 09+10, 12+13).

No.	Title	Related anime episode
1	"The Mean Behavior of Youth"; Transliteration: "Seishun no Ijiwaru" (Japanese: 青春のいじわる)	ep01
Kenji draws a mustache on Yurie's face in her dream because she is a God.
2	"Please God (Part 1)"; Transliteration: "Kami-sama Onegai (Zenpen)" (Japanese: 神様お願い〜前編)	ep02 (ep01)
Miko is introduced and they hold a ceremony in this episode.
3	"Please God (Part 2)"; Transliteration: "Kami-sama Onegai (Kōhen)" (Japanese: 神様お願い〜後編)	ep02
Similar story to the anime's.
4	"I Didn't Mean It (Part 1)"; Transliteration: "Sonna Tsumori ja Nakatta no ni (Zenpen)" (Japanese: そんなつもりじゃなかったのに〜前編)	ep03
Similar story to the anime's.
5	"I Didn't Mean It (Part 2)"; Transliteration: "Sonna Tsumori ja Nakatta no ni (Kōhen)" (Japanese: そんなつもりじゃなかったのに〜後編)	ep03
Similar story to the anime's.
6	"51% Love Possibility"; Transliteration: "Koi no Kakuritsu 51%" (Japanese: 恋の確率51%)	N/A
Yurie and Kenji takes a make-up exam after the final exam. Kenji tells Yurie that he would like to see the long haired girl he saw in the typhoon.
7	"The Bouquet of Stars"; Transliteration: "Hoshi no Hanataba" (Japanese: 星の花束)	ep04
Upon being sent from the God Association, Team ShiYawase tries to make a wish of a lady they met at Yashima Shrine come true.
8	"I Can't be Alone"; Transliteration: "Hitori ja Irarenai" (Japanese: ひとりじゃいられない)	ep07
Yurie, Mitsue, and Matsuri enjoy shopping. Yurie loses her way and meets a god of old-fashioned toy who is almost forgotten by people. As she plays with it, and the god arises in people's minds for a while. That reminds Yurie herself the appreciation for her friends.
N–A	"Dear Your Highness, From Above the Road"; Transliteration: "Zenryaku, Michi no Ue yori" (Japanese: 前略、道の上より)	N/A
A short side-story about the daily life of the people from Oshou's perspective.
9	"Help, God! (Part 1)"; Transliteration: "Kamisama Herupu! (Zenpen)" (Japanese: 神様ヘルプ!〜前編)	ep10
Yurie is appointed as mayor for a day. When Yurie is complimented by mayor, she is carried away and tries to make everyone's demands come true.
10	"Help, God! (Part 12)"; Transliteration: "Kamisama Herupu! (Kōhen)" (Japanese: 神様ヘルプ!〜後編)	ep10
Upon waking up from a long sleep, Yurie finds she made troubles all over the town, but people have known they are the one who should make it better themselves.
11	"Something I Can't Say"; Transliteration: "Ienai Hitokoto" (Japanese: 言えないひとこと)	ep11
When Miko breaks the bow she obtained from her dead mother, she cannot tell anyone. Shōkichi notices her trouble and tries to help her out.
12	"Friendly Relationship (Part 1)"; Transliteration: "Tomodachi no Kankei (Zenpen)" (Japanese: トモダチの関係〜前編)	ep12
Mitsue complains about Matsuri's disregard of Yurie's burden. Their friendship gets worse while Yurie is absent.
13	"Friendly Relationship (Part 2)"; Transliteration: "Tomodachi no Kankei (Kōhen)" (Japanese: トモダチの関係〜後編)	ep12 (ep11)
Yurie's classmates offer to give their stitchworks to Yurie at her last class in her temporary school. She finally gets a chance to be friends with her classmates.
14	"School Heaven"; Transliteration: "Gakuen Tengoku" (Japanese: 学園天国)	N/A
Yurie's class builds a haunted house at the school festival. When Yurie gets a long hair wig to play a ghost, she tries to figure out why Kenji wished to see the long-haired girl.
15	"Pure Love Countdown"; Transliteration: "Jun'ai Kauntodaun" (Japanese: 純愛カウントダウン)	ep12
On New Year's Eve, Yurie helps the Yashima Shrine. Kenji gives a practice of a big-scaled calligraphy to Yurie. Yurie is worried about that she cannot confess her love to Kenji. At the moment, the god Benzaiten drops in to see Yurie and encourages her.
16	"God's Timing"; Transliteration: "Kamisama no Taimingu" (Japanese: 神様のタイミング)	ep06 (ep15)
When Kiyomi wants to give a chocolate to Kenji for the Valentine's Day, Yurie helps her. Kiyomi notices that an unconscious Kenji is in love with Yurie, so she decides to back away from Kenji and gives him her chocolate just as an appreciation. However, Yurie misunderstands the situation because she sees Kenji receives it rapidly.
17	"Cloudy After Sunny"; Transliteration: "Kumori, Nochi Hare" (Japanese: 曇り、のち晴れ)	N/A
While Yurie is stuck in her room, the town economy gets down again. She tries to bounce herself back and figure out the reason. Yurie happened to know Kiyomi's feelings on her way and finds out the reason of the bad economy too. However, Yurie is still nervous to confess her love to Kenji. At the moment, incidents related to proverbs happen throughout the town.
18	"Hey, Spring Has Come"; Transliteration: "Hora ne, Haru ga Kita" (Japanese: ほらね、春が来た)	N/A
Kenji's calligraphies and a spiritual paper weight he happened to pick up cause troubles. They tear all the calligraphy but the last one, "Snowy general" (冬将軍, Fuyu Shōgun) is blown away. Kenji and Yurie writes big "First spring storm" (春一番, Haru Ichiban) on the snow together. When Yurie shouts "Kamichu", spring suddenly comes and Kenji sees the long haired girl standing beside him holding their hands.

=== Music ===
Three Kamichu! CDs were released:

1. Ice Candy Maxi (アイスキャンディー Maxi, Aisu Kyandī Maxi) (August 24, 2005)
2. Hare Nochi Hare! Maxi (晴れのちハレ! Maxi; Sunshine After Sunshine! Maxi) (August 24, 2005)
3. Kamichu OST (October 26, 2005)

== Reception ==
The anime received an Excellence Prize at the 2005 Japan Media Arts Festival.

== See also ==
- Arahitogami: More information on human being as a God(dess) in Shinto religion.
