= Kan Tanaka =

Japanese voice actor

Kan Tanaka (田中 完, Tanaka Kan) is a Japanese voice actor affiliated with 81 Produce.

== Voice roles ==
=== Anime ===
- Ah! My Goddess The Movie (Ishii)
- Avenger (Commissioner, Scholar B)
- D.Gray-man (Tapp Dopp)
- Duel Masters (Dr. Root)
- Geneshaft (Elder Ewers)
- Ginga Legend Weed (Chourou, Hook)
- Glass Mask (TV 2005) (Kuroiwa (ep.8,10,12))
- Heat Guy J (Carlo)
- Honey and Clover (Professor A (ep.16), Teacher A (ep.21,24))
- Ichigeki Sacchu!! HoiHoi-san (OVA) (Pharmacy owner)
- Kaikan Phrase (Director (ep.34-35), office manager (ep.36))
- Maburaho (Principal Mori)
- Madlax (Brian)
- MÄR (Senior)
- Naruto (Akame Iwana)
- Naruto the Movie: Ninja Clash in the Land of Snow (Hidero)
- PaRappa the Rapper (Bank Employee (ep.6, 24), Father (ep.16), Security Guard (ep.29))
- Petite Princess Yucie (Doctor (ep.24-25), History teacher (ep.5))
- Pumpkin Scissors (Grandfather (ep.3))
- Puni Puni Poemy (Narrator)
- Requiem from the Darkness (Heisuke (ep.11))
- Saiyuki Reload (Meichin (ep.8))
- Shinobi no Ittoki (Mitsuzō Moriyama)
- Sky Girls (Oto)
- Starship Operators (Hans Georg Hermann)
- Super Robot Wars Original Generation: The Animation (Sean Webley)
- Trinity Blood (Narration (ep.1), Government priest (ep.3), Butler (ep.4))
- Tsubasa: RESERVoir CHRoNiCLE (Statue (ep.26))
- Undefeated Bahamut Chronicle (Zogwa Sharutosu (ep.4, 8))

=== Tokusatsu ===
- Bakuryu Sentai Abaranger (Trinoid #17: Shiyohosenkameleon (ep.28))
- Ninpuu Sentai Hurricanger (Barrier Ninja Kekkaibo (ep.1))

=== Drama CDs ===
- Border Line Series (Mitsuya - General Manager)

=== Dubbing Roles ===
==== Live-action ====
- The Butler (2016 BS Japan edition) – James Holloway (Lenny Kravitz)
- San Andreas – Dr. Lawrence Hayes (Paul Giamatti)

==== Animation ====
- Thomas and Friends – Sir Topham Hatt (Season 18-onwards, replacing Rokurō Naya) and Farmer Trotter (Season 13-onwards, succeeding Naoki Kinoshita)
