= Not Lives =

Japanese manga series

- The cover of the first manga volume

ノットライヴス (Notto Raivusu)
- Manga
- Written by: Wataru Karasuma
- Published by: ASCII Media Works
- English publisher: NA: Seven Seas Entertainment
- Magazine: Dengeki Daioh
- Original run: August 2011 – December 2016
- Volumes: 10

Not Lives (ノットライヴス, Notto Raivusu) is a Japanese manga series written and illustrated by Wataru Karasuma. The series began publication in ASCII Media Works's Dengeki Daioh magazine in 2011. Seven Seas Entertainment licensed the series for publication in North America.

== Synopsis ==
Shigeru Mikami (三神 シゲル, Mikami Shigeru) is a high school student who spends his time trying to develop the perfect visual novel video game. When he plays a new game called "[Not Alive]" that he picked up seemingly by accident when he rushed in the subway later on he finds himself pulled literally into the game and out of the flow of time as a "Player". Sharing a form in-game with former-Player-turned-Avatar Kyouka Amamiya (天宮 鏡花, Amamiya Kyōka), Shigeru must participate in a survival game where losing will means that Kyouka Amamiya will die and Mikami Shigeru will become an avatar.

== Volumes ==
The series has been compiled into ten tankōbon volumes, the first of which was published in English in March 2016.

No.	Original release date	Original ISBN	English release date	English ISBN
Volume 1	27 January 2012	978-4-04-886282-0	29 March 2016	978-1-626923-07-2
Volume 2	27 July 2012	978-4-04-886846-4	21 June 2016	978-1-626923-11-9
Volume 3	27 February 2013	978-4-04-891455-0	23 August 2016	978-1-626923-14-0
Volume 4	27 September 2013	978-4-04-891939-5	27 December 2016	978-1-626923-67-6
Volume 5	26 April 2014	978-4-04-891455-0	11 April 2017	978-1-626924-56-7
Volume 6	27 August 2014	978-4-04-866846-0	8 August 2017	978-1-626925-18-2
Volume 7	27 January 2015	978-4-04-869134-5	2 January 2018	978-1-626925-90-8
Volume 8	27 August 2015	978-4-04-865291-9	3 April 2018	978-1-626927-25-4
Volume 9	27 February 2016	978-4-04-865291-9	26 June 2018	978-1-626928-53-4
Volume 10	17 December 2016	978-4-04-892293-7	25 September 2018	978-1-626929-01-2
