= Kunihiko Tanaka =

Japanese manga artist and character designer

Kunihiko Tanaka 田中 久仁彦
- Born: August 12, 1970 (age 56)
- Areas: Manga artist, character design
- Notable works: Ruin Explorers, Ichigeki Sacchu!! HoiHoi-san

Kunihiko Tanaka (田中 久仁彦, Tanaka Kunihiko; born August 12, 1970) is a Japanese manga artist and character designer. He designed the characters for Xenogears, Xenosaga Episode I: Der Wille zur Macht and Xenoblade Chronicles X, as well as character concept design for the anime Key the Metal Idol. He wrote the manga for Ruin Explorers which was made into an OVA in 1995.

== Works ==
=== Manga ===
Title	Year	Notes	Refs
Ruin Explorers	1995 (vol.)	Published by Hoppy Japan Comics for 2 volumes Also credited in anime (Note: Tanaka was credited as the original author or character designer in the anime adaptation of this title)	
Ichigeki Sacchu!! HoiHoi-san	2004 (vol.)	Serialized in Dengeki Daioh; Published by Dengeki Comics EX for 1 volume Also credited in OVA short.	
Ryu-Kotsu (龍骨)	2008 (vol.)	Published for 1 volume	

=== Video games ===
List of production work in anime
Year	Title	Crew role	Notes	Source
1989	Ys III: Wanderers from Ys	Character design		
1989	Dragon Slayer: The Legend of Heroes	Character design		
1990	Dinosaur	Character design		
1991	Popful Mail	Character design		
1998	Xenogears	Character design		
2002	Xenosaga: Episode I	Character design		
2004	Xenosaga: Episode II	Character illustration		
2008	Sands of Destruction	Character design	Also credited in anime.	
2015	Xenoblade Chronicles X	Character design		
2017	Xenoblade Chronicles 2	Finch, KOS-MOS, Shulk, Fiora and Elma Character designs		

=== Anime ===
List of production work in anime
Year	Title	Crew role	Notes	Source
1994	Key the Metal Idol	Original Character Design	OVA	
