= Indian Summer (manga) =

Japanese manga by Takehito Mizuki

- First edition of Indian Summer, published by ComicsOne on February 16, 2005.

こはるびより (Koharu Biyori)
- Genre: Comedy, sci-fi
- Manga
- Written by: Takehito Mizuki
- Published by: MediaWorks
- English publisher: NA: ComicsOne (before), DrMaster (before)
- Magazine: Dengeki Moeoh
- Original run: May 18, 2001 – October 26, 2011
- Volumes: 7
- Original video animation
- Directed by: Takayuki Inagaki
- Produced by: Takaya Ibira; Nobuhiro Nakayama; Shun Umezawa; Yasuhiro Mikami
- Written by: Takashi Aoshima
- Music by: Takeshi Watanabe
- Studio: Daume
- Licensed by: NA: Sentai Filmworks
- Released: October 14, 2007 – April 2, 2008
- Episodes: 3

Indian Summer (Japanese: こはるびより, Hepburn: Koharu Biyori) is a Japanese manga written and illustrated by Takehito Mizuki. The manga was serialised in MediaWorks's monthly Dengeki Daioh before MediaWorks moved the title to the quarterly Dengeki Moeoh. The manga was formerly licensed in English by ComicsOne and DrMaster.

== Characters ==
- Yui (ゆい, Yui) is the female protagonist and Takaya's robot maid. Voiced by: Eri Kitamura
- Takaya Murase (村瀬貴也, Murase Takaya) is the male protagonist and Yui's owner. He has a maid fetish and is good at cooking and sewing. Voiced by: Takayuki Kondo
- Minori Sumitomo (住友みのり, Sumitomo Minori) likes Takaya and works as a maid in her dad's cafe, Cafe Cowbeya. Voiced by: Satomi Akesaka
- Tetsushi Sumitomo (住友哲志, Sumitomo Tetsushi) is Minori's father and Cafe Cowbeya's owner. Voiced by: Kenta Miyake
- Tenchou (店長, Tenchou) is the shop manager. Voiced by: Kaya Miyake
- Ayumi Hagiwara (萩原歩美, Hagiwara Ayumi) Voiced by: Yuka Iguchi
- Kanae Hagiwara (萩原香苗, Hagiwara Kanae) is Ayumi's mother. Voiced by: Ryouka Yuzuki
- Ran Midou (御堂蘭, Midou Ran) is the younger sister of Sumire. Voiced by: Sayuri Yahagi
- Sumire Midou (御堂菫, Midou Sumire) is the older sister of Ran. Voiced by: Saori Hayami
- Sakuya (さくや, Sakuya) is Takaya's ultimate customized figurine. Voiced by: Ai Shimizu

== Media ==
=== Manga ===
Koharu Biyori is written and illustrated by Takehito Mizuki. The manga was serialised in MediaWorks's monthly Dengeki Daioh before MediaWorks moved the title to the quarterly Dengeki Moeoh. The manga is licensed in North America by ComicsOne. The English license was transferred to DrMaster after ComicsOne's collapse. As of February, 2009, MediaWorks has published four tankōbon of the manga. ComicsOne released the first volume of the manga on February 16, 2005. The manga is licensed in Taiwan by Ever Glory Publishing.

==== Volume listing ====
No.	Original release date	Original ISBN	English release date	English ISBN
1	March 27, 2004	978-4-84-022626-4	February 16, 2005	978-1-58-899249-9
2	February 27, 2006	978-4-840-23367-5	—	—
3	July 27, 2007	978-4-84-023926-4	—	—
4	March 27, 2008	978-4-84-024249-3	—	—
5	March 27, 2009	978-4-04-867717-2	—	—
6	July 27, 2010	978-4-04-868783-6	—	—
7	December 17, 2011	978-4-04-886171-7	—	—

=== Anime ===
The manga was adapted into a three-episode original video animation by Doumu. The anime is licensed in the United States by Sentai Filmworks and distributed by ADV Films. However, with ADV being shut down, distribution was now handled by Section23 Films. It was also distributed in Russia by MC Entertainment. The episodes were released in Japan between October 14, 2007, and April 2, 2008.

Geneon released 3 DVDs in Japan. The first DVD was released on November 21, 2007. The second DVD was released on February 8, 2008. The final DVD was released on April 2, 2008. The subtitled series was released on March 10, 2009, in the US, there is no English-dubbed version available.

The original video animations use three pieces of theme music. "Apron dake wa Toranaide!" (エプロンだけは取らないで!) by Eri Kitamura is the series' opening theme, while "Love Song Kamo Shirenai" (ラブソングかもしれない, Rabusongu Kamo Shire Nai) by Eri Kitamura and Satomi Akesaka is the ending theme for the first two episodes. "Hora, Attan Kanan Desu" (ほら, あったんかなんです) by Eri Kitamura is the ending theme for the third episode.

==== Episode list ====
No.	Title	Original release date
1	"Don't Look At Me Like I'm a Pig"; Transliteration: "Buta o Miru Yōna me de Minai de" (豚を見るような目で見ないで)	October 14, 2007
1	"Please Don't Make Me Do Anymore"; Transliteration: "Kore Ijō wa Mō Yurushite" (これ以上はもう許して)	October 14, 2007
1	"My Breasts Don't Produce Milk"; Transliteration: "Watashi, Oppai de Masen yo" (わたし, おっぱいでませんよ)	October 14, 2007
Takaya Murase purchases a maid android. When she arrives she is naked except for a ribbon. Takaya removes it and attempts to dress her up in different outfits to satisfy his clothing fetish. The android claims that Takaya is abusing her and not treating her like a maid. When he persists, she reacts by knocking him out with a punch and disposes of Takaya's figurine collection while he is under. When Takaya finds out what she has done, the android runs away back to the android store. Takaya chases after her and apologizes for his behavior. He then names her Yui. Yui is touched, however, when they return to Takaya's apartment, she finds out that Takaya has filled the room with figurines from his reserve collection. Yui gets Takaya to take her out of the house, believing that he cannot treat her like a doll in public. Nearby, they see a woman in a revealing costume, trying to comfort a lost little girl. Two passing mikos, Sumire and Ran Midou, accuse the woman of indecent behavior and punish her by summoning a giant octopus to assault her. Meanwhile Takaya comforts the girl, learning that she is Ayumi Hagiwara and is upset because she cannot find the "lost child" that is her mother. The costumed woman introduces herself as Minori Sumitomo and invites them all to her father Tetsushi's cafe, Cafe Cowbeya. Takeshi and Takaya immediately hit it off and challenge each other to a dress-up contest, using Minori and Yui as models. There, Ayumi reunites with her mother, Kanae, who is attracted by the competition and winds up joining in. Due to the presence of Kanae and Yui, the shop is packed with customers. Takaya volunteers himself and Yui to help out. Minori is looking after a baby boy for her relatives while they are moving, but her father calls her back to help out at the cafe. Yui volunteers to look after the baby. With Takaya out shopping, she has to look after the baby by herself. Rummaging through Takaya's closet for something to get the baby to stop crying, Yui finds adult-sized baby clothes and changes into them. The baby suckles at Yui's uncovered breast, but her robot breasts do not produce milk, so she gives the baby a bottle. While changing him, Yui becomes fascinated by the baby's penis, calling it a "little elephant". Both Takeya and Minori are scandalized by Yui's clothes when they return, but she tells them it is an official baby-sitter's outfit.
2	"I'm a Leftover After All"; Transliteration: "Douse Watashi wa Urenokori..." (どうせ私は売れ残り...)	February 8, 2008
2	"B..Between the Legs, It's on Fire!"; Transliteration: "Ko... Kokan kara Hi ga!!" (こ...股間から火が!!)	February 8, 2008
2	"An Erotic Man's Secret Activities..."; Transliteration: "Hageshī Otoko no Soro Katsudō?" (激しい男のソロ活動...)	February 8, 2008
Takaya and Yui are helping out at Cafe Cowbeya when Kuon comes by to pick up a take-out order. Yui thinks she must be the daughter of a well-to-do family, but Minori can tell that she is an android because her eyes look like the eyes of an anime character. Kuon introduces herself to Yui and says she has heard so much about her from the android shop owner. At first, Kuon takes pity on Yui, supposing her to be abandoned, but when she realizes that Yui is working at the cafe under Takaya's direction, Kuon becomes jealous and insecure: she still has no master because no one has bought her. To prove her worth as a maid, Kuon enters and wins a robot maid competition. Yui also competes but does poorly. Takaya takes Yui to the beach to cheer her up after her loss. Minori, Ayumi and Kanae all compete for Takaya's attention, but he only pays attention to Yui. Yui is too proud to admit that she can't swim and demonstrates her ability to walk on water, but she overheats her groin from moving her legs so rapidly and causes her bathing suit to catch fire. Even after Takaya teaches her to swim, Yui yells at him and says he should not make assumptions about what she would enjoy. After an interlude in the bath, where Kanae speaks fondly of her dead husband, Yui returns to Takaya and reconciles with him. A strange girl rushes into the cafe, calls Takaya by name and hugs him affectionately. Takaya recognizes Sakuya, a customized figurine from the collection that Yui threw away. Sakuya is actually a new product from the MP android company, based on data collected by a chip embedded in the figurine. Sakuya begins reminiscing about Takuya's solo activities ('secret activities' in the English version), but Takuya is embarrassed and quickly runs out of the shop with her. Back at his home, Sakuya tells Takuya how much she is looking forward to having him do the same things to her that he used to do to her figurine. Yui wakes from about nightmare about this, and asks Takaya why he hasn't customized her. Takaya tells Yui that he likes her just the way she is.
3	"Big Sister... Huh?"; Transliteration: "Onē-sama... Hee? ..." (お姉様... へぇ?...)	April 2, 2008
3	"My Most Important..."; Transliteration: "Watashi no Daijina..." (私の大事な...)	April 2, 2008
3	"It's a Nice Day Like an Indian Summer"; Transliteration: "Koharubi yori desu ne" (こはるびよりですね)	April 2, 2008
Yui loses herself in a school role playing game with heavy yuri themes. All the other characters seem to be present except Takaya, even the giant octopus. She is just getting to the "good part" when Takaya interrupts her. Only then does Yui realize that she was not the only one playing a role. Takaya has been spending less time at home lately, and has no time for Yui. Yui believes that he is busy with work, but when she Sakuya reports that she saw Takaya walking down the street with a strange woman, she assumes the worst. Yui and the other girls decide to find Takaya and follow him. When they find him and hear the strange woman with him suggest that they go to her place Yui collapses from shock. Yui lies in a coma. The store manager cannot find anything wrong with her, yet she continues to sleep. Takaya keeps vigil at her bedside, sewing new clothes for her to pass the time. Yui awakes, but pretends to still be asleep, afraid that Takaya will leave her if she gets up. The strange women who precipitated the crisis shows up (later revealed to be the store manager in casual clothes and with her hair down) and only when Takaya gets up to go to her does Yui rouse, grabbing his sleeve once again.

=== Soundtrack CDs ===
On November 21, 2007, Geneon released an animation soundtrack CD for Koharu Biyori.

Geneon released two Maniac CDs for Koharu Biyori. The first CD, Koharu Biyori Maniacs CD 1 was released on December 21, 2007. The second CD, Koharu Biyori Maniacs CD 2 was released on February 22, 2008. The songs are sung by the voice actors/actresses of the characters.

== Reception ==
Mania.com's Eduardo M. Chavez criticised the manga for having "no plot" and a cast that "lacks personality". He also criticized the manga for the overuse of the moe anthropomorphism. Liann Cooper from Anime News Network criticises the manga for having "no plot" and that the manga's "illustrations look like sloppy sketches". Anime Fringe's Janet Crooker classifies the manga as a Chobits parody.

This manga was the material for me. The artwork really doesn't stand out, neither does the dialogue. I think I would have enjoyed it more as a monthly strip, as when condensed, Indian Summer really has no plot progression. It's just a series of episodes where wacky situations happen and panties are shown.

— Janet Crooker, Anime Fringe

Mania.com's Chris Beveridge commends the OVAs for its "character designs are good, the fanservice just right and it plays things at a slightly different angle because of the androids and the lack of a real crush/interest in the main characters". THEM Anime's Carlos Ross criticises the OVA for "very juvenile" writing and further comments that the OVA "is not a cleanly or adroitly written work in regards to pacing". He also criticises the "very abrupt, kludgy transitions (particularly between episodes two and three) that seem to come clean out of left field".
