= Qualia the Purple =

Japanese light novel and manga

- Cover of the light novel's English edition, featuring Marii Yukari and Manabu "Gaku" Hatou (reflected in eyes)

紫色のクオリア (Murasakiiro no Qualia)
- Genre: Yuri; Science fiction Romance
- Light novel
- Written by: Hisamitsu Ueo
- Illustrated by: Shirou Tsunashima
- Published by: ASCII Media Works
- English publisher: NA: Seven Seas Entertainment
- Imprint: Dengeki Bunko
- Published: July 10, 2009
- Manga
- Written by: Hisamitsu Ueo (original story)
- Illustrated by: Shirou Tsunashima
- Published by: ASCII Media Works
- English publisher: NA: Seven Seas Entertainment
- Magazine: Dengeki Daioh
- Original run: January 27, 2011 – August 27, 2013
- Volumes: 3

Qualia the Purple (紫色のクオリア, Murasakiiro no Qualia) is a yuri science fiction light novel written by Hisamitsu Ueo and illustrated by Shirou Tsunashima. It was first published in Japan by ASCII Media Works under the Dengeki Bunko imprint on July 10, 2009. A manga adaptation, drawn by Tsunashima, was serialized in Dengeki Daioh starting on January 27, 2011, and published in Japan in a total of three tankōbon volumes. Both the novel and its manga adaptation are licensed by Seven Seas Entertainment for publication in North America.

== Premise ==
Marii Yukari, a junior high school student possesses purple eyes via which she perceives all humans as robots. She has only a single friend, Manabu "Gaku" Hatou. Marii is enlisted into a secret organization that wants to take advantage of her powers, and becomes involved in a series of dangerous science experiments whose consequences ultimately force Gaku to make a difficult choice.

== Publication ==
Qualia the Purple was written by Hisamitsu Ueo with illustrations provided by Shirou Tsunashima, and first published in Japan by ASCII Media Works as a Dengeki Bunko title on July 10, 2009. A manga adaptation, drawn by Tsunashima, was serialized in Dengeki Daioh from January 27, 2011, and was published in a total of three volumes. In February 2022, Seven Seas Entertainment announced that they had licensed both the light novel and manga for publication in the English language within North America, and released the novel's English version on December 13, 2022. The manga's English version, which will be published in a single omnibus edition volume as Qualia the Purple: The Complete Manga Collection, was published on June 13, 2023.

=== Manga volume list ===
No.	Release date	ISBN
1	February 27, 2012	9784048864121
2	November 27, 2012	9784048911870
3	October 26, 2013	9784048660129

== Reception ==
Reviewing Qualia the Purple for Anime News Network, Christopher Farris generally praised the plot, characters, and science fiction elements of the story, and opined that the novel would work best if one went into the story knowing as little as possible about its plot twists. Farris described the early chapters of the story as "fun in an inoffensive way," and characterized it as deliberately light in tone in order to make readers more comfortable prior to its more serious plot developments. While Farris said that he greatly enjoyed the story overall, he felt that the "dense" descriptions of theoretical quantum physics topics (which he said could necessitate frequent rereading for some), and some darker turns later in the narrative, could alienate certain readers. Regarding the yuri components of the story, he said that they were not introduced in a manner that readers would anticipate (another factor he perceived as potentially alienating) but nonetheless said that this element of the story was effective and felt that it included "one of the most heartwarming, romantic applications of quantum physics you've yet seen." Farris also praised the English version and its prose, which he said "reads very well."

Maria Remivoza of CBR included the Qualia the Purple manga on a list of "10 Best Underrated Sci-Fi Manga". David Heath of Game Rant included Qualia in a list of "best" science fiction light novels that did not yet have an anime adaptation. Discussing the manga, Tito W. James of Comicon commended the ability of the narrative to "ground high concept quantum mechanics and philosophy in grounded, believable human emotion" and said that Qualia deserved an anime adaptation.
