= Train+Train =

Japanese light novel series by Hideyuki Kurata

- Cover of the first novel of Train+Train as published by ASCII Media Works
- Light novel
- Written by: Hideyuki Kurata
- Illustrated by: Tomomasa Takuma
- Published by: ASCII Media Works
- Imprint: Dengeki Bunko
- Original run: 1999 – 2002
- Volumes: 5
- Manga
- Written by: Hideyuki Kurata
- Illustrated by: Tomomasa Takuma
- Published by: MediaWorks
- English publisher: NA: Go! Comi
- Magazine: Dengeki Daioh
- Original run: January 2000 – May 2003
- Volumes: 6

Train+Train is a Japanese light novel series, written by Hideyuki Kurata (author of the Read or Dream series) and illustrated by Tomomasa Takuma. A manga series was serialized in Dengeki Daioh between January 2000 and May 2003 and was completed by the sixth bound volume. The series is published in Japan by MediaWorks and for the English version, the series' lettering is done by Team Pokopen and is licensed by Go! Comi.

== Plot ==
On Deloca, a distant planet from Earth, high schools are mobile. They exist in train versions, huge ones, with shopping malls and dorms and anything else one would need in an education. Most students go to standard school trains, to travel around the world for a regular education. Reiichi, the protagonist, finds himself on the Special Train after literally being handcuffed to Arena, a young female warrior with brutal assassins pursuing her. The Special Train accepts him and Reiichi finds himself drawn into its adventures, such as having to win two million 'gold' and saving a small mountain town from certain disaster.

== Reception ==
In Jason Thompson's online appendix to Manga: The Complete Guide, he describes the manga's artwork as "sparse and generic", which he felt was at odds with the series' premise of going places and seeing things.
