= Ichigeki Sacchu!! HoiHoi-san =

Manga by Kunihiko Tanaka

- HoiHoi-san

一撃殺虫!!ホイホイさん (Ichigeki Sacchu!! HoiHoi-san)
- Genre: Comedy, mecha, science fiction
- Manga
- Written by: Kunihiko Tanaka
- Published by: MediaWorks
- Magazine: Dengeki Daioh
- Published: September 30, 2003
- Volumes: 1
- Video game
- Publisher: Konami
- Genre: Action
- Platform: PlayStation 2
- Released: 2003-11-27
- Original video animation
- Directed by: Takuya Sato
- Studio: Daume
- Released: 28 September 2004
- Runtime: 10 minutes
- Manga

Ichigeki Sacchu!! HoiHoi-san Legacy
- Written by: Kunihiko Tanaka
- Published by: MediaWorks
- Magazine: Dengeki Black Maoh
- Original run: 19 September 2007 – present

HoiHoi-san, full title Ichigeki Sacchu!! HoiHoi-san (Japanese: 一撃殺虫!!ホイホイさん; lit. "One-Shot Bug Killer!! Interceptor Doll HoiHoi-san") is a manga by Kunihiko Tanaka that spawned a PlayStation 2 game and a ten-minute OVA (sold with the first printing of manga tankōbon).

In the year 20XX, insects have become immune to all pesticides. To combat the rising plague of cockroaches and other household pests, the tiny, doll-like extermination gynoids known as "Hoihoi-san" were created. They can hunt down insects and kill them with such miniaturized weapons as minuscule machine guns and tiny combat knives. They can also (and at the same time) be treated as dolls, by dressing them in costumes and buying accessories for them. The main robot of the anime wears a maid uniform and rabbit ears as accessories.

== History ==
It started as a manga title serialized in the Japanese language monthly magazine Dengeki Daioh published by MediaWorks. It later branched out to PlayStation 2 as a game and then into numerous other media channels.

The setting is in year 20XX at a time when insects are immune to all insecticides, so Japanese pharmaceutical companies have had to come up with the next level in insect extermination: small but heavily armed robots.

Hoihoi-san is the bug-killing robot of the title, a 10.5 cm tall doll like robot that comes with a wide range of weapons.

The Hoihoi-san series of products parodies the girls with guns genre, robot girls as companions and the otaku.

== Characters ==
Not all characters in the manga appear in the OVA. The ones in the OVA are indicated by the presence of the respective voice actor in the list below.

ID-3 Hoihoi-san (ホイホイさん)
Voiced by: Rie Kugimiya
A line of insect exterminating robots made by Mars Pharmaceuticals. The designation "ID-3" stands for Interceptor Doll (Version) 3.
Aburatsubo-kun (油壷)
Voiced by: Shoutarou Morikubo
A lonely otaku whose only company is the Hoihoi-san that he dotes and spend his money on.
Kimiko Dewa (出羽きみ子, Dewa Kimiko)
Voiced by: Megumi Nasu
Kimiko works in a Kyoto pharmacy frequented by Aburatsubo-kun, selling bug killing robots and accessories. She wants a robot doll but cannot stomach the carnage.
Mutsumi "Mu-chan" Fushikawa (不死川睦美, Fushikawa Mutsumi)
Voiced by: Mai Nakahara
A friend of Kimiko-chan.
Manager (店長, Tenchō; "Manager")
Voiced by: Kan Tanaka
The owner of the pharmacy.
Furuyashiki-san (古屋敷)
Furuyashiki works at Mars Pharmaceuticals, proponent of odd Hoihoi-san upgrades. Suspended from work and subsequently resigned after photos of himself wearing Hoihoi-san style maid dress were posted to the internet.
Yazaki-kun (矢崎)
Yazaki works for Furuyashiki-san.
RRX-7.8 Combat-san (コンバットさん)
Voiced by: Rie Tanaka
A line of insect extermination robots created by Kinryu.
PEST-X-san (ペストXさん)
The third interceptor Doll, developed by Furuyashiki in America after he resigned from Mars Pharmaceuticals. Includes special motorcycle that transforms into a set of large hands. Perceives Combat-san as its enemy.
DG-001LN Usagear (ウサギーア)
The fourth interceptor Doll, not much is known about her yet besides the fact that her Kotobukiya model kit is slated for release in December 2014.

== Media ==
=== Game ===
The game, released 27 November 2003, is a third-person shooter game where the main aim is to complete levels defeating hordes of various kinds of insects, all while avoiding collateral damage to furniture and other household items. Completing a level gives the player credits with which one can buy upgrades for the Hoihoi-san, ranging from the useful like missile packs, ammunition and weapons upgrade but also less useful items like new clothing and new voices.

In the game the muzzle blast is about the size of the robot, which combined with an impressive rate of fire makes for a definite statement in the girls-with-guns genre. A modicum of style, finesse and Japanese tradition is retained by featuring a katana in the weapons selection. The game allows the player to use both a katana and a machine gun at the same time.

If the player acquires all Hoihoi-san accessories, the backdrop turns pink on returning home.

=== Manga ===
A series of single page manga by Kunihiko Tanaka were serialised in the seinen manga magazine Dengeki Daioh. The manga centered around the life of Aburatsubo-kun and his Hoihoi-san in Kyoto.

The manga follows up in the bizarreness with lines such as:

- "The spare ammunition kit is sold out, huh? I suppose I'll just buy her a pair of gloves."
- While a life sized Hoihoi-san is levelling Aburatsubo-kun's flat, on the telephone: "It's on a rampage? I know that already!!"

A spinoff manga titled Ichigeki Sacchu!! HoiHoi-san Legacy by Kunihiko Tanaka started serialization in the seinen manga magazine Dengeki Black Maoh on 19 September 2007.

=== Anime ===
The manga and the Original Video Animation were part of a special edition package. The anime itself is only about 10 minutes long, and maintains the unusual humor by combining massive gunplay with squeaky booties. Unlike the manga, the anime is centered around Kimiko Dewa, who abhors the nightly carnage by her insect killing robots. She would rather they were more like pets and made her own costumes.

=== Doll ===
An articulated doll was produced, in a limited edition, that in the spirit of the rest of the venture features numerous weapons and shields. Due to laws in Japan the doll does not fire live ammunition, neither from the machine gun, nor from the missile launcher, so the company regretted lack of insecticidal effect. The dress can still be customised.

=== Dress demo ===
A demo was made in Adobe Flash that can be used to demonstrate numerous Hoihoi-san outfits.

== Licensing ==
While the game was published officially in Japan only and neither OVA nor manga were officially translated, the owners have guarded this intellectual property with unusual intensity. An unlicensed scanlator received a C&D letter in behalf of MediaWorks, the Japanese publisher of the title.

In 2007, Infinity Studios released an official English language version of the first manga.

== Allusions ==
- The names of Hoihoi-san and her in-universe manufacturer Mars Pharmaceuticals are references to Gokiburi Hoi-Hoi, a baited sticky trap for roaches (distributed internationally as Hoy Hoy Trap-A-Roach), and its manufacturer, Earth Corporation. Combat-san's name and in-universe manufacturer Kinryu are references to Combat, a bait station for poisoning and exterminating cockroach colonies, and its manufacturer KINCHO.
- Combat-san's model number, RRX-7.8, is probably a parody of the original Mobile Suit Gundam's RX-78.
- The cover of the anime parodies Gunslinger Girl (particularly volume 1).
- One of the promotional wallpapers made for the PlayStation 2 game shows Hoihoi-san falling backwards while firing guns, one in each hand, in a pose and rate of fire that is very similar to that of Trinity in The Matrix Reloaded shown in the trailer.
