= Kamikaze Explorer! =

2011 Japanese adult visual novel

カミカゼ☆エクスプローラー! (Kamikaze Ekusupurōrā!)
- Genre: Harem, Fantasy, Supernatural, Romance
- Manga
- Written by: Clochette
- Illustrated by: Ooi Masakazu
- Published by: ASCII Media Works
- Magazine: Dengeki Hime
- Published: January 2011
- Video game
- Developer: Clochette
- Publisher: Clochette
- Genre: Eroge, Visual novel
- Platform: Windows XP/Vista/7
- Released: JP: May 27, 2011 (PC limited ed.); JP: August 26, 2011 (PC regular ed.)
- Manga
- Written by: Clochette
- Illustrated by: Achumuchi
- Published by: ASCII Media Works; Kadokawa Shoten
- Magazine: Dengeki Hime
- Original run: November 2013 – present
- Volumes: 1

Kamikaze Explorer! (カミカゼ☆エクスプローラー!, Kamikaze Ekusupurōrā!; "Reckless Explorer!") is a Japanese adult visual novel developed by Clochette. It was first released for Windows PCs on May 27, 2011. Kamikaze Explorer!'s story follows the main character Keiji Hayase, and takes place in the future, where the younger generation use a special power called Metis. The gameplay follows a branching plot line which offers pre-determined scenarios with courses of interaction, and focuses on the appeal of the five female main characters by the player character.

Kamikaze Explorer! had overall very good sales, charting as the best-selling visual novel at the time of its release, and the fourth best-selling visual novel of 2011 according to Getchu.com. Various media based on the game has been produced, such as two manga adaptations which serialized in ASCII Media Works' Dengeki Hime magazine, an art book, music CD, and merchandise.

== Gameplay ==
Kamikaze Explorer! is a romance visual novel in which the player assumes the role of Keiji Hayase. Much of its gameplay is spent reading the text that appears on the screen, which represents the story's narrative and dialogue. The text is accompanied by character sprites, which represent who Keiji is talking to, over background art. Throughout the game, the player encounters CG artwork at certain points in the story, which take the place of the background art and character sprites. Kamikaze Explorer! follows a branching plot line with multiple endings, and depending on the decisions that the player makes during the game, the plot will progress in a specific direction.

There are five main plot lines that the player will have the chance to experience, one for each of the heroines in the story. Throughout gameplay, the player is given multiple options to choose from, and text progression pauses at these points until a choice is made. Some decisions can lead the game to end prematurely and offer an alternative ending to the plot. To view all plot lines in their entirety, the player will have to replay the game multiple times and choose different choices to further the plot to an alternate direction. Throughout gameplay, there are scenes depicting Keiji and a given heroine having sex.

== Plot and characters ==
In the near future, the living areas for humans reduce due to climate and terrain changes. As if in unison, some of the younger generation develop special powers called "Metis". There are many types of Metis, from magic barriers to being able to breathe under water. Suminoe Academy (澄之江学園, Suminoe Gakuen) was constructed to train and develop those students with Metis. Keiji Hayase (速瀬 慶司, Hayase Keiji), the protagonist of Kamikaze Explorer!, doesn't have any powers, but he was scouted by an agent from the school and ends up attending the school. He is then recruited into Argonaut, a club for helping people with their problems.

Keiji befriends many people during his stay at Suminoe Academy, one of them being his classmate Fuuka Himekawa (姫川 風花, Himekawa Fūka; voiced by Hinata Ayukawa), a popular and friendly female student whose Metis is Aegis. Her parents died in a car accident during her childhood, resulting in her going to an orphanage, before being enrolled at Suminoe Academy. He also meets Mishio Yuutenji (祐天寺 美汐, Yūtenji Mishio; voiced by Yukari Aoyama), the granddaughter of an important figure involved in the establishment of Suminoe. Mishio is very confident and refined, and is somewhat arrogant. Her Metis is Prominence.

Keiji has a younger sister who enrolls at Suminoe, called Manami Hayase (速瀬 まなみ, Hayase Manami; voiced by Himari). Manami, who is sometimes nicknamed "Mana", is very energetic and outgoing, but possessive of her brother. Her Metis is Penetrator. Keiji has a childhood friend called Kotoha Okihara (沖原 琴羽, Okihara Kotoha; voiced by Nazuna Gogyou), whose Metis is Mermaid, and is also Fūka's best friend and roommate. Unlike Fuuka, Kotoha does not care for studying, as she tends to be quite mischievous and carefree. The last heroine is Saori Usami (宇佐美 沙織, Usami Saori; voiced by Miru), the discipline committee leader who means well, but it overly strict, especially to Keiji. Her Metis is Umbla.

== Development and release ==
Kamikaze Explorer! is Clochette's fourth work, after Amatsu Misora ni!. Hitoshi Oshiki designed the characters in Kamikaze Explorer!, whilst background art was drawn by Sasanqua, Katsuhiko Hino, and Studio Tulip. Three people worked together to write the scenario: Aku Himenogi, Toujaku, and J-Sairo; Himenogi also planned and drafted Kamikaze Explorer!.

The trial version of the game was first made available for download on the Kamikaze Explorer! official website on April 7, 2011. Adult content was still included in the trial. A limited edition of Kamikaze Explorer! was released for a Windows XP/Vista/7 PC as one DVD on May 27, 2011. Kamikaze Explorer! was again released on August 26, 2011, but as a regular edition.

== Adaptations ==
=== Print ===
A manga one-shot by Ooi Masakazu was published in the January 2011 issue of ASCII Media Works' Dengeki Hime magazine. Another manga illustrated by Achumuchi has serialized in Dengeki Hime starting from the November 2013 issue. Kadokawa Shoten has released the compiled chapters into a tankōbon volume which went to sale on June 13, 2014, under ASCII Media Works' publishing imprint Dengeki Comics.

A 119-page art book under the title Kamikaze Explorer! Visual Fan Book was released by Enterbrain on November 4, 2011. The book contains story and character explanations, staff interviews, a glossary for the terms in the visual novel, pinups, and more.

=== Other media ===
There are three main pieces of music used in Kamikaze Explorer!. The opening theme is "Explorer World" sung by NANA, two ending themes; "Believe in You" sung by Hiromi Satō, and a grand ending theme called "Ai Kou Mono" (愛乞う者; "Love Seeker") which is sung by AiRI. A Kamikaze Explorer! original soundtrack CD was released by Bell on January 27, 2011, containing all songs and BGM used in the game.

A character sleeve collection has been released by Broccoli notably depicting Kamikaze Explorer! heroines Fuuka and Saori. A Kamikaze Explorer! character card box collection was released by Broccoli on July 20, 2012.

== Reception ==
In 2011, Kamikaze Explorer! has ranked four times in the top ten in national PC game pre-orders in Japan. The rankings were at No. 6 from January to March, and No. 2 in April. Kamikaze Explorer! premiered as the No. 1 game sold on Getchu.com, a major redistributor of visual and domestic anime products, during the month of its release, and No. 26 in June. On the website, Kamikaze Explorer! would go on to chart as the fourth best selling visual novel of 2011. The 2011 Moe Game Awards gave Kamikaze Explorer! gold prizes for graphics, character design, and eroge (pink). Kamikaze Explorer! also won silver prizes for the grand prize, and for BGM.

MangaGamer has shown interest in localizing the visual novel in English.

== See also ==
- Suzunone Seven!
