= Sands of Destruction =

2008 video game

- Developer: Imageepoch
- Publisher: Sega
- Director: Ryoei Mikage
- Producer: Yoichi Shimosato
- Artists: Kunihiko Tanaka; Kimihiko Fujisaka
- Writer: Masato Kato
- Composers: Yasunori Mitsuda; Shunsuke Tsuchiya; Kazumi Mitome
- Platform: Nintendo DS
- Release: JP: September 25, 2008; NA: January 12, 2010
- Genre: Role-playing
- Mode: Single-player

Sands of Destruction (Note: Known in Japan as World Destruction: Guided Wills (ワールド・デストラクション～導かれし意思～, Wārudo Desutorakushon ~Michibikareshi Ishi~)) is a 2008 role-playing video game developed by Imageepoch and published by Sega for the Nintendo DS. It was released in Japan in 2008, and in North America in 2010. Set in a desert world where humans are ruled over and persecuted by the anthropomorphic Ferals, the story revolves around protagonist Kyrie after learning he holds the power to destroy the world. Gameplay features exploration of the game world from a top-down perspective, and a turn-based combat system incorporating real-time mechanics.

The game was created as an RPG with an unconventional story premise, though darker aspects of its story draft were toned down for a wider audience. Notable staff included writer Masato Kato, artists Kunihiko Tanaka and Kimihiko Fujisaka, and co-composer Yasunori Mitsuda. The game was supported by a Production I.G-produced anime series and a manga which featured different interpretations of the same world and characters. Japanese pop band AAA composed theme songs for the game and anime. Reception of the game was mixed, with the one common point of praise being the soundtrack.

== Gameplay ==
A combat sequence in Sands of Destruction

Sands of Destruction is a role-playing video game in which players control a group led by protagonist Kyrie across a desert world, their progress through the game dictated by the main storyline quest. The game world is navigated from a top-down perspective: characters are represented with 2D sprites within 3D environments with a rotatable in-game camera. The player party goes between safe town areas, housing facilities and shops where equipment and weapons can be bought, and dungeon environments which contain puzzles and hostile encounters. These are selected from a world map. Towards the game's end, a number of optional quests are available to complete.

Combat is triggered through random encounters in dungeons. The combat scene covers both of the Nintendo DS screens, with ground and air-based enemies appearing on different screens. In battle, a party of three characters faces the enemy group. The combat uses a turn-based system with real-time elements. When a character's turn appears, the player inputs a sequence of attacks the current party member then performs: depending on type, attacks will take varying amounts of a character's Battle Points. Battle Points are limited, and vary depending on a semi-hidden Morale mechanic. After landing six attacks, the party member automatically uses either a special move or a magic spell. Landing ten attacks in a row or a critical hit grants additional Battle Points to the character, while using all Battle Points unlocks a final powerful attack triggered using a quick time event. Using a resource dubbed SP, party members can perform special actions that can either deal damage, or provide utility and support.

After battle, the party is rewarded with experience points to raise a character's level and statistics, and Customization Points which can be used to upgrade different combat skills' accuracy or attack power. Equipment attributes can be upgraded using rare materials. Additionally, characters learn vocal lines dubbed Quips. Up to four Quips can be assigned to the character who learns them. They can grant boons such as increased battle rewards, or boosting attack or defence.

== Synopsis ==
=== Setting and characters ===
Sands of Destruction is set on a desert world that is periodically destroyed and reborn by an ancient force tied to a power dubbed the Destruct Code and guarded by the four Primal Lords. In the current incarnation of the world, the population is split between humans and anthropomorphic Ferals. Ferals, ruled by the Twelve Beast Lords, mostly treat humans as a slave class. In response to this, two human-centric factions emerge: the World Annihilation Front who seek to find the Destruct Code and destroy the world, and the Golden Lions who oppose the Ferals but wish to preserve the world. To oppose them, the Beast Lords create the World Salvation Committee to defend the current system.

The main characters are members of the World Annihilation Front. The protagonist is Kryie, a peaceful-minded young man orphaned from birth who has lived a sheltered existence with friendly Ferals. He becomes allied with Morte, an outwardly cheery woman determined to destroy and restart the world due to it appearing beyond salvation. The pair are joined by Agan Mardrus, a friend of Morte's and member of the Golden Lions; Taupy, a Feral bounty hunter with the appearance of a teddy bear; and Rhi'a Dragunel, the last of the dragon people tied to the world's beginning and end. Naja Gref, initially pursuing the World Annihilation Front before joining their ranks, is a half-Feral who suffers discrimination due to his mixed parentage.

=== Plot ===
Kyrie lives in the village of Barni with his uncle, where humans and Ferals are treated as equals by their ruler the Beast Lord Ursa Rex. One day, Kyrie hears a voice which triggers a power which turns Barni and everyone there into sand, including Ursa Rex. Arrested for Barni's destruction, he is rescued by Morte and the World Annihilation Front. Morte, determined to destroy the world, attempts to sway Kyrie to her side by the oppression of humans under the Ferals. During their travels, they are joined by Taupy, an initially reluctant Agan, and by Rhi'a to observe events. The group, guided by orders from the World Annihilation Front's unknown leader, fights two of the Primal Lords so Kyrie can gain their power. Kyrie comes to care for Morte, and continues hearing the voice pushing him towards his role as the "Destruct". On orders from the World Salvation Committee, Naja pursues them to preserve the remaining Primal Lords.

Kyrie attempts to negotiate a peace between the Front, the Committee, and the Golden Lions, but his power resurfaces and destroys the surrounding area. The Primal Lord Crimson Sun, revealed to have been posing as Kyrie's uncle, appears to a despairing Kyrie and reveals his destiny to destroy the world. When Naja corners the group, Kyrie has Naja kill him as destroying the world would kill Morte. A despondent Morte is given a message from the Front's leader that Kyrie can be resurrected, and is directed to find Crimson Sun by the Beast Lord Lacertus Rex. Naja joins them, having become conflicted about his role in Kyrie's death, and the party fights the remaining Beast Lords who oppose their plan to revive Kyrie. They discover Kyrie has reverted to an energy form, refusing to manifest due to his role as the Destruct. Morte uses her own love for Kyrie to restore his human form, with Crimson Sun granting them his blessing as they have chosen to remake rather than destroy the world.

Gaining the power of the final Primal Lord, the party are summoned to Lacertus Rex, who is revealed to be the secret founder of the World Annihilation Front, having used Morte and Kyrie to recover the Destruct Code so he can remake the world in his image. They pursue Lacertus Rex to the Primal Cataract, a river of energy flowing to the Ark where the world's Creator resides. Killing Lacertus Rex, the party confronts the Creator, an artificial being who birthed Kyrie to initiate the latest cycle of destruction and rebirth. Kyrie rejects his role, and the party defeats the Creator. Using the Primal Lords' powers, Kyrie and Morte remake the world into a flourishing land where the desert sea has become an ocean of water, and humans and Ferals can leave in peace as equals.

== Development ==
Sands of Destruction was developed by Imageepoch, a Japanese developer then known for their work on the Luminous Arc series. The staff included Imageepoch founder Ryoei Mikage as director, Sega's Yoichi Shimosato as producer, scenario writer Masato Kato, and composer Yasunori Mitsuda. The concept originated when Mikage, Shimosato, Mitsuda and Kato—who all knew each other to varying degrees—got together for a lunch and Migake pitched the idea of working together on a new non-traditional RPG. As Sega was not known for RPGs, Imageepoch had greater creative freedom when designing the game. At the time the game was pitched, Mikage said there were no RPGs for the DS outside established series, with their choice of platform arising from wanting to create a title which played against genre expectations. The two-screen combat system caused trouble for the programming team, with there being a "difficult few months" before they were able to get it working correctly. Mikage later said the team's priority was "just trying to get the game out on time", leading to later quality concerns.

Kato agreed to create the scenario as there was space in his schedule. His concept, with a group of young people wanting to destroy the world rather than save it, was meant as an inversion of the typical Japanese RPG storyline. Scenario company Gekko helped with the script writing. Kato's original draft was much darker, with the Ferals using humans as food and several graphic scenes being featured. Mikage described the scenario as mirroring human attitudes towards animals. Due to concerns surrounding the DS's younger audience and fearing a harsh rating from Japan's CERO board, the story was toned down for broader appeal. Despite regrets, Shimosato felt that the developers had made the right decision in regards to marketing the game in Japan. When creating the final scenario, Kato could not portray the darker elements explicitly, incorporating humor to obfuscate the premise. Both Shimosato and Kato, while understanding the necessity, felt the darker story would have found an audience.

The characters were designed by Kunihiko Tanaka and Kimihiko Fujisaka. Additional character and art design was handled by a large team including Tsukasa Kado and Shin Nagasawa. The character Taupy was designed by Kato, whose rough sketches were liked enough by the team to be used. Kato described Morte as his favorite character, though most of the staff liked Taupy for his unconventional attitude and appearance. While the DS was typically not known for large environments and 3D graphics, Mikage wanted impressive graphics and persuaded Sega to have the game use a two-gigabit cartridge. The increased storage allowed 3D environments with a rotating camera, detailed sprites, three hundred cutscenes including CGI sequences, and extensive voice acting. The CGI scenes were co-produced by Image Corporation, Sanzigen and Dynamo Pictures. The CGI character models were created by freelance designer Satoshi Ueda. 2D graphics were retained to create a "nostalgic" atmosphere. The sound programming was handled by Procyon Studio's Hidenori Suzuki. The Japanese cast featured prominent voice actors including Mamoru Miyano (Kyrie), Maaya Sakamoto (Morte), Tōru Furuya (Taupy), Yui Ichikawa (Rhi'a), Hiro Mizushima (Naja), and Hiroyuki Yoshino (Agan).

=== Release ===
Sands of Destruction, known as World Destruction in Japan, was announced in April 2008. As part of its promotion, an eighteen-episode radio program was broadcast between July and October 2008, featuring guests from the game's production team and cast. The full Japanese title translates to World Destruction: Guided Wills. The game was released in Japan by Sega on September 25, 2008. It was later supplemented with a guidebook published by Enterbrain in October 2008, and an artbook published by Kotobukiya in March 2009.

A North American version was confirmed by Mikage in October 2008, and officially confirmed by Sega's North American branch in December. For the Western version, the team focused on improving the game compared to its Japanese version. Based on feedback from the Japanese player base, the random encounter rate was adjusted to be lower and bugs were addressed. The game's title was also changed to Sands of Destruction as Sega felt World Destruction was too blunt and generic, taking inspiration from the in-game sand sea for the localized title. Originally planned for release first in 2008 and then in 2009, it eventually released in North America on January 12, 2010.

=== Music ===
The music for Sands of Destruction was co-composed and co-arranged by Mitsuda, Shunsuke Tsuchiya and Kazumi Mitome. As they were old friends, Mitsuda's work on the score would influence some of Kato's work on the scenario. Mitsuda contributed around twenty tracks to the score. The main theme, composed by Mitsuda with lyrics by Kato, was performed by the Czech Philharmonic Collegium conducted by Mario Klemens, with vocals by the Czech Philharmonic Children's Choir conducted by Jiří Chvála. Mistuda chose the Czech Philharmonic due to the positive reputation of European orchestral string performances. A mixed choir was chosen over his initial idea of an all-boys choir to create a fuller impression of the game's world.

The original opening theme, "Crash", was performed by Japanese pop group AAA. The song's theme was described as seeing the many sides of one's self, whether that was facing an unseen enemy or destroying an ugly other side. For the Western release, a new opening theme was composed by Tsuchiya. Tsuchiya described the replacement as necessary "[for] sales overseas", while Shimosato said the original song lacked appeal to a Western audience. Tsuchiya felt the new opening theme gave Sands of Destruction "a unique impression" compared to the Japanese original.

"Crash" was released on June 18, 2008, as part of the group's mini-album Choice is Yours. Five tracks from the game were included on a promotional album, World Destruction Premium Soundtrack, which came with pre-orders in Japan. When asked in an interview, Mitsuda stated there were no plans for a full soundtrack album release.

== Reception ==
Reception

Aggregate score
Aggregator	Score
Metacritic	63/100

Review scores
Publication	Score
Famitsu	31/40
GameSpot	5/10
GameTrailers	6.7/10
IGN	7.4/10
Nintendo Life	8/10
Nintendo Power	7/10
RPGamer	3.5/5
RPGFan	75%

In Japan, the game sold 56,000 copies in Japan in its debut week, ranking fourth place in a top ten list collated by Media Create. By the end of 2008, the game had shipped nearly 90,000 units, ranking 152 in Media Create's sales charts of the top three hundred game titles.

Japanese gaming magazine Famitsu focused much of its praise on the combat system, positively noting its use of both screens and its combination of new and classic mechanics. Corbie Dillard of Nintendo Life praised the game for its story, gameplay and graphical design, with his main complaints being a lack of original elements and linear structure. IGN's Levi Buchanan enjoyed the game overall, but felt some of the gameplay systems were overly complex and took too much time for the player to learn. Mike Moehnke of RPGamer was generally positive about the game, saying that the flaws in its gameplay design "should not prevent an audience prepared for some frustration from having a good time with it."

GameSpot's Carolyn Petit praised the story and noted the game's ambition, but faulted its short length and issues with its sound design and difficulty. David F. Smith of Nintendo Power noted there was little original in the game's premise and combat, but praised the dungeons and gameplay design. GameTrailers felt the initial premise was strong and enjoyed the graphics, but faulted the later story elements and the balance of the combat system. RPGFan's Kyle E. Miller was unimpressed with the game, finding the soundtrack the only thing he could unreservedly praise, and finding points of criticism in all other parts of its presentation and mechanics.

Sands of Destruction received "mixed or average" reviews according to review aggregator website Metacritic based on twenty critic reviews. The story divided opinion, with some praising it, and other feeling it faltered after its start or lacked originality. The combat system was generally praised for its approach to genre mechanics. GameTrailers, Petit and Moehnke noted uneven difficulty spikes between being extremely easy and frustratingly difficult. The mixture of 2D and 3D graphics was seen as impressive for the platform but not high quality. The voice acting was seen as good quality for the platform, though some found fault in the deliveries. The music met with unanimous praise.

== Anime and manga ==
- World Destruction

ワールド・デストラクション (Wārudo Desutorakushon)
- Genre: Fantasy
- Anime television series

World Destruction: Sekai Bokumetsu no Rokunin
- Directed by: Shunsuke Tada
- Produced by: Akira Uchida; Toyokazu Hattori
- Written by: Masahiro Yokotani
- Music by: Yoshihiro Ike
- Studio: Production I.G
- Licensed by: NA: Funimation Entertainment
- Original network: TV Tokyo
- Original run: July 7, 2008 – September 30, 2008
- Episodes: 13
- Manga

World Destruction: Futari no Tenshi
- Written by: Murao Minoru
- Published by: ASCII Media Works
- Magazine: Dengeki Maoh
- Original run: June 27, 2008 – July 27, 2009
- Volumes: 2

Sands of Destruction was announced as part of a three-part multimedia project covering the game, an anime adaptation, and a manga adaptation. This was dubbed the "World Destruction Project". Discussions of media expansions emerged when the game was 50% completed and the scenario had been finalised, with the team wanting to expand the story beyond the technical limitations of the DS. While each part used the same premise and characters, the stories were allowed to go in different directions. The anime and manga both began release prior to the game.

The anime, World Destruction: Sekai Bokumetsu no Rokunin, (Note: ワールド・デストラクション ～世界撲滅の六人～; World Destruction ~The Six Who Destroy the World~) was animated by Production I.G's "Section 10" studio. The staff included director Shunsuke Tada, co-producers Akira Uchida and Toyokazu Hattori, writer Masahiro Yokotani, and composer Yoshihiro Ike. The anime was worked on by younger members of Production I.G's staff, with Tada saying they wanted to focus on smaller character moments left untold within the game. Kato and Yokotani met early on to discuss the overall scenario, but otherwise the two teams had no direct contact. The main cast carried over aside for the characters Rhi'a and Naja, who were respectively voiced by Yū Kobayashi and Daisuke Ono. AAA wrote the opening theme "Zero", with members Shinjiro Atae and Chiaki Ito having cameo roles in the anime. The ending theme "Kaze no Kioku" was written by Matsukuma Kenta and sung by Aimmy.

The thirteen episodes were broadcast between July 7 and September 30, 2008; it was broadcast first on Tokyo TV, and later through TV Osaka, TV Aichi, TV Setouchi, TV Hokkaido, and TVQ Kyushu Broadcasting. The series was released on DVD in Japan in six volumes between September 26, 2008, and February 25, 2009. Funimation released a complete collection for DVD in North America on January 26, 2010, and a reissue on December 14. It was offered through Funimation's streaming services in 2010, and by Crunchyroll in 2017. Both used the localized title Sands of Destruction. Reviews of the anime were generally mixed from Western journalists.

The manga, World Destruction: Futari no Tenshi, (Note: ワールド・デストラクション ～ふたりの天使～; World Destruction ~Two Angels~) was created by Murao Minoru. Futari no Tenshi emerged after Dengeki Maoh editor-in-chief Shusuke Toyoshima heard about Sands of Destruction and proposed the manga to Sega after seeing the world design. Minoru, known for his work on the manga Knights, was recommended by Toyoshima based on for ability to create "strong" action sequences and characters. Minoru's goal was to develop for own take on the premise over a longer period of time. The manga began serialization in Dengeki Maoh first with a prologue chapter on June 27, 2010, in the "August" issue, then with its first full chapter on July 26 in the "September" issue. The serial ran until the following "September" issue, published on July 27, 2009. The manga was published in two volumes on January 27, and September 26, 2009.
