= Tori Koro =

Manga by Hai Ran

トリコロ
- Genre: Comedy, Slice of life
- Manga
- Written by: Hai Ran
- Published by: Hobunsha
- English publisher: NA: DrMaster
- Magazine: Manga Time Kirara
- Original run: 2002 – 2005
- Volumes: 2
- Manga

Tori Koro MW-1056
- Written by: Hai Ran
- Published by: ASCII Media Works
- Magazine: Dengeki Daioh
- Original run: 2006 – Hiatus
- Volumes: 1

Tori Koro (トリコロ) (aka. Tricolo) is a Japanese manga written and illustrated by Hai Ran. The manga was serialised in Hobunsha's Manga Time Kirara until 2005, when it was discontinued. Media Works's Dengeki Daioh started to serialised the manga in June 2006. The manga is published in Japan by Hobunsha and is licensed in North America by DrMaster.

== Reception ==
Anime News Network's Carlo Santos commends the manga for its "simple, pleasing art and easily identifiable character" but criticises it for making a futile attempt at "being funny".
