= Hideyuki Kurata =

Japanese novelist and anime script writer

Hideyuki Kurata (倉田 英之, Kurata Hideyuki; born July 9, 1968 in Ibara, Okayama Prefecture) is a Japanese anime screenwriter, light novelist, and manga artist, noted for authoring the series composition of such works as Read or Die, Now and Then, Here and There, Kamichu!, and Gun Sword. He has been a member of Yōsuke Kuroda's creative group Studio Orphee since 2003, and has collaborated with Kuroda on many series, including Hellsing Ultimate, Drifters, and Goblin Slayer.

== Screenwriting ==
=== Anime television series ===
- series head writer denoted in bold
- **Magical Project S** (1996-1997)
- **Battle Athletes Victory** (1997-1998)
- **Android Announcer Maico 2010** (1998)
- **Excel Saga** (1999)
- **Now and Then, Here and There** (1999)
- **Brigadoon: Marin & Melan** (2000)
- **R.O.D the TV** (2003)
- **Kamichu!** (2005)
- **Gun X Sword** (2005)
- **Bamboo Blade** (2007)
- **Kannagi: Crazy Shrine Maidens** (2007)
- **Samurai Harem: Asu no Yoichi** (2009)
- **Whispered Words** (2009)
- **Oreimo** (2010-2011)
- **The World God Only Knows** (2010-2011)
- **Dragon Crisis!** (2011)
- **Ore no Imōto ga Konna ni Kawaii Wake ga Nai.** (2013)
- **The World God Only Knows: Goddesses** (2013)
- **Tokyo Ravens** (2013)
- **Samurai Flamenco** (2013-2014)
- **Recently, My Sister Is Unusual** (2014)
- **Nanana's Buried Treasure** (2014)
- **Tokyo ESP** (2014)
- **The Fruit of Grisaia** (2014)
- **The Eden of Grisaia** (2015)
- **Maria the Virgin Witch** (2015)
- **Scorching Ping Pong Girls** (2016)
- **Drifters** (2016)
- **Made in Abyss** (2017)
- **Goblin Slayer** (2018)
- **Girls' Frontline** (2022)
- **Made in Abyss: The Golden City of the Scorching Sun** (2022)
- **Goblin Slayer II** (2023)
- **Rurouni Kenshin** (2023)

=== OVAs ===
- Magical Girl Pretty Sammy (1996)
- Parade Parade (1996)
- Matou Kitan Zankan (1996-1997)
- Battle Athletes (1997)
- Magical Play 3D (2001)
- Read or Die (2001)
- Milkyway (2003)
- Hellsing Ultimate (2006-2012)
- Kaitō Tenshi Twin Angel (2008)
- Ikki Tousen: Shūgaku Tōshi Keppu-roku (2012)
- Goblin Slayer: Goblin's Crown (2020)

=== ONAs ===
- Onimusha (2023)

=== Films ===
- Welcome to the Space Show (2010)
- The Labyrinth of Grisaia (2015)
- Made in Abyss: Mezameru Shinpi (2026)

== Bibliography ==
=== As a novelist ===
- Merriment Carrying Caravan – Sabaku no Shirakage
- Train+Train
- Read or Die

=== As a manga original writer ===
- Train+Train
- Cloth Road
- Read or Die
- Read or Dream
- Samurai Rising
- HandxRed
- R.O.D Rehabilitation
