= Yuri Seijin Naoko-san =

Japanese manga series written and illustrated by Kashmir

百合星人ナオコサン
- Genre: Surreal comedy, yuri
- Manga
- Written by: Kashmir
- Published by: ASCII Media Works
- Magazine: Dengeki Daioh
- Original run: May 2005 – April 2014
- Volumes: 5
- Original video animation
- Directed by: Tetsuya Takeuchi
- Written by: Tetsuya Takeuchi
- Music by: MOSAIC.WAV
- Studio: Ufotable
- Released: December 10, 2010
- Runtime: 6 minutes
- Original video animation
- Directed by: Tetsuya Takeuchi
- Written by: Tetsuya Takeuchi
- Music by: MOSAIC.WAV
- Studio: Ufotable
- Released: February 15, 2012
- Runtime: 30 minutes

Yuri Seijin Naoko-san (百合星人ナオコサン; lit. Lesbian Alien Naoko-san) is a Japanese manga series written and illustrated by Kashmir. The manga began serialization in the May 2005 issue of ASCII Media Works' monthly shōnen manga magazine Dengeki Daioh. A six-minute OVA adaptation by ufotable was released in December 2010, followed by a thirty-minute OVA released in February 2012.

== Plot ==
A girl named Misuzu rushes home in order to see her elder sister, Naoko. When she arrives there, however, she finds her sister has been replaced by a self-proclaimed yurian named Naoko-san who seeks to conquer the world by 'yurifying' it.

== Characters ==
Naoko-san (ナオコサン)
Voiced by: Satomi Arai
An alien who comes from the Planet Yuri and takes the place of Misuzu's sister. She appears to have an attraction to young girls. She also loves to read Yuri books and anything that has to do with eroticsm.
Misuzu (みすず)
Voiced by: Akari Harashima
A shy human girl whom Naoko-san comes into contact with. She misses her older sister and tends to have flashbacks of her.
Ryōta (涼太)
Voiced by: Yukari Kokubun
Misuzu's androgynous little brother, who is often commanded to do weird things by Naoko-san.
Hii-chan (柊ちゃん)
Voiced by: Ai Nonaka
Misuzu's best friend, who wears glasses. She appears to have a deranged crush on Misuzu and is also entranced with anything 'outer-space' related.
Mother (お母さん, Okā-san)
Voiced by: Kumi Tanaka
Misuzu and Ryota's mother. Like Naoko-san, she also seems to take an interest in erotic books involving young girls.
Dark Naoko-san (アヤコサン)
A robotic version of Naoko-san that lives on the roof of Misuzu and Ryota's home. Her personality resembles Misuzu's older sister.
Aya-chan (彩ちゃん)
A pink-haired girl that attends the same school with Ryota and appears to be quite fond of him.
Ayako-san (アヤコサン)
Another female alien who is obsessed with yaoi.
Jashin-san (邪神ちゃん)
Another female alien with cyan hair who loves manga. She also has a crush on Naoko-san.
Naoko (奈緒子)
Voiced by: Satomi Moriya
Misuzu's older sister who is strangely absent due to ambiguous reasons.
Train Alien (ちかん星人, Chikan Seijin)
Voiced by: Manabu Sakamaki
An alien that appears in the first OVA who comes from the Planet Molestrian (according to Naoko-san).

== Media ==
=== Manga ===
The original manga by Kashmir began serialisation in ASCII Media Works' Dengeki Daioh magazine from May 2005. The first tankōbon volume of the manga was released on December 9, 2006, and five volumes have been released as of April 26, 2014.

=== Anime ===
Two original video animation adaptations of the manga have been produced by Ufotable. The first one was six-minutes in length and was released on December 10, 2010. A second thirty-minute OVA was released on February 15, 2012, as part of an Anime Bunko lineup alongside adaptations of Gyo and Minori Scramble!. The opening theme is "Yuri Seijin Naoko-san" (百合星人ナオコサン) by MOSAIC.WAV, whilst the ending theme is "Photon Belt Tourist Hotel" (フォトンベルト観光ホテル, Foton Beruto Kankō Hoteru) by MOSAIC.WAV.
