= I Can't Believe I Slept with You! =

Japanese manga series by Miyako Miyahara

- Japanese cover for Volume 1

一度だけでも、後悔してます。 (Ichido Dake Demo, Kōkai Shitemasu.)
- Genre: Romance; Slice of Life; Yuri
- Manga
- Written by: Miyako Miyahara
- Published by: ASCII Media Works
- English publisher: NA: Seven Seas Entertainment
- Magazine: Dengeki Daioh
- Original run: June 27, 2019 – February 26, 2021
- Volumes: 3
- icon

I Can't Believe I Slept with You! (一度だけでも、後悔してます。, Ichido Dake Demo, Kōkai Shitemasu.) is a Japanese yuri manga series written and illustrated by Miyako Miyahara. The manga was serialized in ASCII Media Works' monthly shōnen manga magazine Dengeki Daioh from June 2019 to February 2021. The story follows Koduka Chiyo after she has a one-night stand with her landlady.

== Plot ==
After Koduka Chiyo quits her job and spends her time wallowing in self-pity she becomes three months behind on her rent. Her landlady proposes an unusual solution: perform favors for her in exchange for the owed money – with the first being that the two sleep together. After a one-night stand, the two women decide to keep the arrangement, slowly growing closer over the coming months.

== Publication ==
Written and illustrated by Miyako Miyahara, I Can't Believe I Slept with You!, was serialized in ASCII Media Works' shōnen manga magazine Dengeki Daioh from June 27, 2019, to February 26, 2021. The series was collected in three tankōbon volumes from January 2020 to March 2021.

The series is licensed for an English release in North America by Seven Seas Entertainment.

No.	Original release date	Original ISBN	English release date	English ISBN
1	January 27, 2020	978-4-04-912974-8	February 15, 2022	978-1-64827-795-5
2	August 27, 2020	978-4-04-913395-0	June 14, 2022	978-1-63858-304-2
3	March 26, 2021	978-4-04-913663-0	November 8, 2022	978-1-63858-776-7

== Reception ==
The manga was nominated for the sixth Next Manga Award in 2020 in the print category.

The series has received generally positive reviews. Anime News Network gave the first volume of I Can't Believe I Slept with You! an overall B rating, remarking of the premise had a lot of legwork to do to bring readers around to the main couple but remarked that they were "nevertheless surprised at just how subtle yet involved the series is in raising some rather realistic questions about non-heteronormative sexual orientations and how society views them." Erica Friedman of Yuricon gave the first volume "solid 7 with plenty of room to grow", praising the art, though noting a disconnect with the comedy aspects of the series due the to sad circumstances of each characters lives, "As a romantic comedy, when the comedy is rooted in pain, it's hard for me to laugh."

The series was featured on BookWalker's top-selling manga ranking for 2022.
