= Shizuru Hayashiya =

Japanese manga artist

Shizuru Hayashiya (林家 志弦, Hayashiya Shizuru) is a Japanese manga artist. She is best known for her Hayate × Blade series, which is licensed in English by Seven Seas Entertainment, and the manga adaptation of the anime Please Teacher!.

== Works ==
- Engeki Shoujo Inochi (演撃少女 命) (2000, serialized in Dengeki Daioh, ASCII Media Works)
- Sister Red (シスターレッド) (2001-2003, serialized in Dengeki Daioh, ASCII Media Works)
- Onegai Teacher (おねがい☆ティーチャー, Please Teacher!) (2002-2003, serialized in Dengeki Daioh, ASCII Media Works)
- Hayate × Blade (はやて×ブレード) (2004-2008, serialized in Dengeki Daioh, ASCII Media Works) (2008 reprint vol. 1–8, Shueisha) (2008-ongoing, serialized in Ultra Jump, Shueisha)
- Ultra Sword (2004)
- Biijene! Beat Punk Generation (ビージェネ！ Beat Punk Generation) (2006, serialized in Sylph, ASCII Media Works)
- Strawberry Shake Sweet (ストロベリーシェイクSWEET) (2006-2009 Ichijinsha)
