= Twinkle Crusaders =

Video game

- Twinkle Crusaders logo

ティンクル☆くるせいだーす (Teinkuru Kuruseidāsu)
- Genre: Drama, fantasy, romance
- Manga
- Written by: Lillian
- Illustrated by: Kotamaru
- Published by: ASCII Media Works
- Magazine: Dengeki Hime
- Original run: December 2007 – October 2008
- Manga
- Written by: Lillian
- Illustrated by: Jin Arima
- Published by: ASCII Media Works
- Magazine: Dengeki Daioh
- Original run: April 2008 – August 2008
- Volumes: 2
- Video game
- Developer: Lillian
- Publisher: Lillian (PC); ASCII Media Works (PSP)
- Genre: Eroge, Visual novel
- Platform: Windows, PlayStation Portable
- Released: September 26, 2008 (WIN); September 9, 2010 (PSP)
- Manga

Twinkle Crusaders GoGo!
- Written by: Lillian
- Illustrated by: Hijiki
- Published by: ASCII Media Works
- Magazine: Dengeki Daioh
- Original run: July 2009 – October 2010
- Volumes: 2

Twinkle Crusaders (ティンクル☆くるせいだーす, Teinkuru Kuruseidāsu; commonly abbreviated as Kurukuru (クルくる)) is a Japanese visual novel developed by Lillian, and was originally released as an eroge for Windows on September 26, 2008. The game is described by the development team as a "Heart-pounding exciting student council love comedy" (どきどきワクワク生徒会ラブコメ, Dokidoki Wakuwaku Seitokai Rabukome). The gameplay in Twinkle Crusaders follows a linear plot line, which offers pre-determined scenarios and courses of interaction, and focuses on the appeal of the five female main characters.

Twinkle Crusaders has also been adapted into four manga adaptations: a four-panel comic strip adaptation was serialized in the bishōjo magazine Dengeki Hime, a second adaptation was serialized irregularly in Dengeki Daioh and concluded with four chapters, a one-shot eromanga chapter was published in the eromanga magazine Megastore, and a fourth adaptation entitled Twinkle Crusaders GoGo! was serialized in Dengeki Daioh.

It was succeeded by gacha eroge Twinkle☆Star Knights, which launched on July 7, 2023 in japan. A Global release was announced on October 22, 2026 to appear on Erolabs.

== Plot ==
The player assumes the role of Shin Sakura (咲良シン, Sakura Shin), the protagonist of Twinkle Crusaders. Shin is the student council president of Ryūsei Academy (流星学園, Ryūsei Gakuen), a position which he thought came with free meals from the cafeteria, as he has been raised in a poor family and is in need of money. Unfortunately there's no such thing as a free meal.

Synn Sakura (咲良シン, Sakura Shin)
Voiced by: Mitsuki Saiga
Main protagonist of the series. He comes from a poor family but became the student council president of Ryuusei Academy through sheer dumb luck, out of a sole desire for free food (which ended up not coming true). As it turns out, one of the jobs of the council is to fight off demons, or Mazoku. This is particularly troublesome for Shin, since his father is the previous maou (demon lord), and he himself is to be his successor. He later goes on to take on his role, but still continues to fight for good.

In battle Shin uses the dark element, and has two forms. His first form is prior to his ascendance to maou, and his title is Vicious Lancer. In this form, he has average stats all-around except "Potential," which is maxed out. This leads into his second form as maou, titled Ancient Overlord, where he receives a boost in power, attack speed, and charge speed, as well as changing his hair color white.

Nanaka Yuugiri (夕霧ナナカ, Yūgiri Nanaka)
Voiced by: Keito Mizukiri
One of the five heroines, she is Synn's lively childhood friend. Nanaka has a crush on Shin and has been following him around since she was young, enrolling in the same school and joining the student council, where she is the accountant. She likes sweet confectioneries and is the president of the sweets club at school. She holds a grudge against the president of the wagashi (Japanese Sweets) Club Akane Misasagi(御陵彩錦). While the sweets club receives no budget from the school and not even recognized as a proper club, Misasagi's wagashi club have "wagashi for thought" and was recognized as a club (though only in name). Her title is Sword Master).

In battle, Nanaka has fire-based attacks, and is the powerhouse of the original group. In her first form, her power is on par with Shin's upgraded form, but her own upgraded form increases her power to go even further beyond that. Her speed and charge are average, with her support being below average in her first form, and average in her second. She's not the best in unisons, but in exchange, she can deal substantial damage even if she attacks solo. She's also the main protagonist of the anime series.

Lolotte Rosenkreuz (ロロット・ローゼンクロイツ, Rorotto Rōzenkuroitsu)
Voiced by: Motomi Nanaho
A first-year student and the student council's secretary. Despite her attempts to hide the fact that she's actually an angel, it is generally known to the other characters, unbeknownst to her. Despite her looks and her voice, she's a real foul-mouth, though without any malicious intent. She is always carrying "Tontoro," a piggy bank filled with 500 yen, and always breaking it. She also carries a guidebook around that seems to have everything in context (although the usages are often wrong). Her family, the Rosenkreuz family, includes some of Ryuusei City's multimillionaires. She commutes by car, and her butler Riesling never leaves her side outside the school ground. Her title is Elemental Muse.

In battle she uses water element and her power is not strong; her speed is unpredictable as well with a decent charge, making her support in some battles.

Misa Brigitta Cristelis (聖沙・ブリジッタ・クリステレス, Misa Burijitta Kurisuteresu)
Voiced by: Kayo Sakata
Twinkle Crusaders's third heroine and the student council's vice-president. Misa thinks of Shin as a rival, and always challenges him despite always ending up in second, falling behind Shin. She is especially annoyed about losing the election, which Shin won by chance. She has her cousin Shion Asuka i(飛鳥井紫苑) (who actually calls her "姉上(Big Sister)") as her assistant in some battles.

Ria Kujoh (九浄リア, Kujō Ria)
Voiced by: Yuki Sakata
The fourth heroine in Twinkle Crusaders, Ria, is a clumsy and soft-spoken third year student. Ria serves as an adviser to the student council due to her past experience as the student council president. She enjoys wagashi and participates in the wagashi club at school. She's also the younger sister of the current chief director Helena (ヘレナ) who was in the current student council's shoes when she was a student. Helana assists Ria is some battles.

Azel (アゼル, Azeru)
Voiced by: Rumi Abe
Azel is the final heroine in Twinkle Crusaders, a second-year student who transferred into Shin's class in the middle of the story. Azel is very quiet and has a cold attitude towards others. She does not participate in any school activities, and like Shin, comes from a poor family.

Shion Asukai (飛鳥井紫苑, Asukai Shion)
Voiced by: Akiko Hasegawa
Misa's cousin, she is the shrine maiden of the Asukai Shrine and she assists Misa during battles. Like the twinkle crusaders, she too hunts demons due to her role, but she is somewhat reckless while hunting and destroys part of the street while Synn and Misa are passing by.

Sacchiho Takahashi (高橋, Takahashi Sachiho)
Voiced by: Asami Shimoda
Close friend of Nanaka. Nickname “Sacchin”. A very positive personality -- just talking with her will make one feel lazy -- but surprisingly, she has a dark side. She is one of the few members of Sweets Association but often pisses Nanaka off since she likes anything sweet in general, including Japanese treats. Has poor academic grades, but has insights on life. She has a sharp sense on relationships -- when Synn chose other people she will comfort Nanaka.

Akane Misasagi (御陵彩錦, Misasagi Akane)
A classmate of Ria and President of the Wagashi club.

== Gameplay ==
Twinkle Crusaders is a combination of visual novel and turn-based strategy game. The novel portion consists of large amounts of often comedic conversations between characters, based on selections the player makes. There are also a lot of Easter eggs hidden within the game that can be discovered by choosing certain options during gameplay. The battle portion of the game consists of turn-based "scenes" where the player must reduce the opponent's Hit Points (HP) to zero using various battle strategies. In order to proceed with the story, the player must successfully defeat the enemy.

== Development ==
Twinkle Crusaders was first announced as the first project to be developed by the visual novel developer Lillian in the Japanese bishōjo magazine Tech Gian, on November 21, 2006. Art direction and character designs were provided by Rei Kannagi and Kotamaru who assisted Kannagi in the process. While the scenario in the game was worked on by Shigeta and Hideto Mayura, with Hozumi Nakamoto who provided assistance in the preparation of the story. The music in the game was composed entirely by Amedio. With the exception of Hozumi Nakamoto, the entire development team has previously worked on previous titles developed by Pajamas Soft, such as Prism Ark.

=== Release ===
Before the game's release, three game demos were distributed online at the visual novel's official website, while a separate demo were distributed at retail stores. The demos gave the player a glimpse into the characters and the story of the game, and also introduced the player to the gameplay system, typically the battle system used in the game. The full game was first released on September 26, 2008, as both a limited edition and a premium edition. The limited edition release included the game itself, an arrange album titled Kira-kira Sound Festival, an art collection by twelve different artists, and a clear plastic casing. The premium edition release included the extras found in the limited edition release along with a silver necklace, and is limited to one-thousand units. An all-ages version entitled Twinkle Crusaders GoGo! was released for the PlayStation Portable published by ASCII Media Works on September 9, 2010, and contains additional content not found in the original release, namely a new heroine and promoting a sub heroine to heroine status. A release for windows 7 named Twinkled Crusader Remaster was released on 24 June 2010, since this was released before Twinkled Crusaders GoGo!, it does not contain the extra content from it.

=== Internet radio show ===
An internet radio show to promote the Twinkle Crusaders, titled Radio Twinkle Crusaders (RADiO ティンクル☆くるせいだーす, Radio Teinkuru Kuruseidāsu) was first streamed online on August 27, 2008, as a pre-broadcast episode. It began its regular broadcast on September 10, 2008, and was streamed online bi-weekly on Mondays. The radio show is hosted by Kimiko Koyama and Shizuka Itō, who voiced Melilot and Herena in the visual novel, and is produced by Onsen.

=== Manga ===
Before the game's release, a four-panel comic strip manga adaptation was serialized in ASCII Media Works' bishōjo magazine Dengeki Hime between the December 2007 and October 2008 issues sold on October 30, 2007, and August 30, 2008, respectively. The story of the manga is based on the visual novel, despite it not having been released yet, and was illustrated by Japanese illustrator Kotamaru, who has also contributed to the art in the game. A second manga adaptation was serialized irregularly between the April 2008 and August 2008 issues of Dengeki Daioh, published by ASCII Media Works on February 21 and June 21, 2008, respectively, and concluded with four chapters. The second manga was illustrated by Jin Arima, and unlike the first manga which is inspired from the visual novel, the story of the second manga's story is instead based on the game's storyline. A one-shot manga chapter was also serialized in the ero-magazine Megastore on May 17, 2008. The manga chapter was drawn by Yasushi Kawakami, and contained erotic content not found in the other two manga adaptations. A fourth manga adaptation entitled Twinkle Crusaders GoGo! began serialization in Dengeki Daioh's July 2009 issue on May 27, 2009, and was illustrated by Hijiki and in October 2010.

== Reception and sales ==
From mid-February to mid-March, the limited edition of Twinkle Crusaders was the eighth most pre-ordered title, according to a Japanese national ranking of PC games. It was then ranked as the most pre-ordered title in Japan from mid-March to mid-April, the fifth from mid-April to mid-May. The game was also the second most pre-ordered game from mid-May to mid-June, only falling behind Little Busters! Ecstasy, after which the game was again placed as the most pre-ordered title in Japan for two consecutive months.
