= Hayate × Blade =

Japanese manga series

- Hayate × Blade English manga volume 1 featuring Hayate (left) and Ayana (right).

はやて×ブレード (Hayate Kurosu Burēdo)
- Genre: Action, comedy, yuri
- Manga
- Written by: Shizuru Hayashiya
- Published by: ASCII Media Works; Shueisha
- English publisher: NA: Seven Seas Entertainment
- Magazine: Dengeki Daioh (2003–2008); Ultra Jump (2008–2013)
- Original run: November 21, 2003 – July 2013
- Volumes: 18
- Manga

Hayate × Blade 2
- Written by: Shizuru Hayashiya
- Published by: Shueisha
- Magazine: Ultra Jump
- Original run: September 2013 – December 2017
- Volumes: 6

Hayate × Blade (はやて×ブレード, Hayate Kurosu Burēdo; read as Hayate Cross Blade) is a Japanese manga series written and illustrated by Shizuru Hayashiya. The series is set in an all-girls school with sword-fighting at the center of the story. It was originally published by ASCII Media Works in Dengeki Daioh between November 2003 and May 2008. It restarted in Shueisha's Ultra Jump in August 2008 and continued until July 2013. The chapters are collected into 18 tankōbon volumes in Japan. Seven Seas Entertainment licensed the manga for release in English. A sequel manga, Hayate × Blade 2, began serialization in the September 2013 issue of Ultra Jump. Three drama CDs based on the manga were released in Japan by Frontier Works in collaboration with Geneon between March 2006 and May 2008.

== Plot ==
Tenchi Academy is an all-girls school that teaches regular classes as well as "Sword Arts". In Sword Arts, students attempt to perfect their combat skills by dueling each other. There are also Duels for Stars (星奪り, Hoshitori), where students form a partnership with another and defeat other pairs to win rank and stars. There are 174 teams (348 students) that fight under the Hoshitori system. The administrator (also the student council president) of the school will give money to those with more stars, saying that "any wish will be granted, if you have enough stars."

Nagi Kurogane is a sword scholarship student of Tenchi Academy. However, she cannot go to school because she is undergoing rehabilitation. Therefore, her twin little sister, Hayate, disguises herself as Nagi to go to the school. In the school, the scholarship student must fight against other scholarship students to win higher ranks. But because Hayate's only interest is how to pretend to be Nagi, she is not interested in the mandatory fights. However, knowing that her old orphanage is in eight million yen in debt, and is being harassed by collectors, Hayate resolves her mind to take part in the fights. The participant gets 50,000 yen if she wins a bout, and she gets one million yen if she enters the next rank.

Since each participant must have her partner, Hayate asks Ayana Mudō to be her partner. Ayana is a talented swordsman, but she does not take part in the fighting because of her personal reasons. At first, Ayana thinks Hayate is annoying, but in order to face her ex-partner whom Ayana injured during the duels, she cooperates with Hayate.

== Characters ==
Hayate Kurogane (黒鉄 はやて, Kurogane Hayate)
Voiced by: Kurumi Mamiya
She attends Tenchi Academy in place of her twin sister. She is well-meaning, but very stubborn and clumsy.
Nagi Kurogane (黒鉄 ナギ, Kurogane Nagi)
Hayate's twin sister. She cannot attend school because of her rehabilitation, so she asks Hayate to pretend to be her and attend Tenchi Academy.
Ayana Mudō (無道 綾那, Mudō Ayana)
Voiced by: Satsuki Yukino
One of the best students in Tenchi Academy, but at the beginning of the story she chooses not to fight. Hayate wants to be her partner, but Ayana finds Hayate to be annoying.
Hitsugi Amachi (天地 ひつぎ, Amachi Hitsugi)
Voiced by: Akiko Yajima
The president of the student council, faculty director, and administrator. She cares very much about the academy's tradition of sword-fighting. As such, she is frustrated with Ayana's lack of desire to participate in the sword duels.
Shizuku Miyamoto (宮本 静久, Miyamoto Shizuku)
Voiced by: Miki Nagasawa
The partner of Hitsugi, Shizuku is also in charge of ringing the bell that signals the start and end of the hoshitori. She is always seen by Hitsugi's side, only leaving to ring the bell. She is also incredibly fast, though Hitsugi wonders who is faster-her or Hayate.
Momoka Kibi (吉備 桃香, Kibi Momoka)
Voiced by: Makiko Ōmoto
Hayate's roommate, Momoka is an energetic girl who initially hides during the hoshitori due to not having a partner. She usually gives Hayate advice on how the system at Tenchi Academy works. She eventually pairs up with Isuzu.
Isuzu Inugami (犬神 五十鈴, Inugami Isuzu)
Voiced by: Mamiko Noto
A rather creepy girl originally resembling a yūrei who appears in volume two, she is first seen 'haunting' Momoka in order to become her shinyuu. After becoming partners with Momoka, she gets a makeover that makes her less frightening. She seems to have quite an interest in the occult.
Jun Kuga (久我 順, Kuga Jun)
Voiced by: Megumi Toyoguchi
Ayana's roommate, Jun is a rather playful girl who enjoys teasing Ayana though this usually earns her a beating. She cares very deeply for her shinyuu Yuho Shizuma, her half-sister.
Akira Mikado (神門 玲, Mikado Akira)
Voiced by: Junko Minagawa
A rather cool and proactive girl, she is Inori Sae's sister-in-arms who seems to have some plans regarding the hoshitori duels, and wants to defeat Hitsugi Amachi with her own hands. She seems to be easily annoyed when other people get too close to her, and appears to be insensitive (as Sae describes her), but actually is the opposite as shown in later volumes. She seems to care deeply for others, but does not show it and even denies it. She seems to be as powerful as the student council president, Hitsugi. Hayate sees her as a mentor.
Sae Inori (祈 紗枝, Inori Sae)
Voiced by: Shizuka Itou
A rather calm and cool girl, who is actually very skilled and very fast, and is often compared to Shizuku (Hitsugi's shinyuu). She is Akira's shinyuu or sister-in-arms. Though they are often seen together, she actually likes to tease Akira a lot. She is actually engaged to one of Akira's relatives. She is Akira's partner in her plan of defeating the student council president and her shinyuu, so that they can 'change' things the way it was meant to be.

== Hoshitori system ==
=== Basic rules and regulations ===
A bell is struck by Shizuku Miyamoto to signal the start of fighting, after which it is struck again every three minutes. Duels are to cease after the bell rings for the fifth time. Therefore, each bout takes place within fifteen minutes. Participants are allowed to fight multiple teams, both successively and concurrently. However, in the case where a student has certain opponents in mind, certain applications need to be made for the challenge. When a team applies to take on multiple teams in one concurrent duel, they are expected to defeat all of them, or have the same number of points as that of all opponents in total deducted if they fail to do so.

Teams generally duel in pairs with each partner using one sword, though as of volume three, an exception is made for Jun Kuga, who fights with two swords. Each team is divided into Heaven (天, Ten) and Earth (地, Chi). Though there is no major difference in their actions in actual battle, the "Heaven" and "Earth" are usually considered to take the offensive and the defensive respectively. The "Heaven" will have her star attached to her left shoulder and the "Earth" will have her star concealed (this is known as the Shadow Star (影星, Kageboshi)). If the "Earth" has her Shadow Star hit, she will be unable to continue fighting. Striking the star of an opponent "Heaven" is the only way to achieve victory. However, the student of a role can only strike the star of the opponent with the same role, otherwise, the strike is considered invalid. A victorious team receives 50,000 yen as a reward, which is apparently increased for higher-level duels.

On special occasions, such as during the sports festival, winning results in a team receiving double the usual number of points. These days are known as a W Up (ダブルアップデー, Daburu Appu Dē; Double-up Day). When a student has zero stars, she will have to forfeit her status as a Sword Arts student. However, she is allowed to make her challenge one more time. The process is known as "Revenge" (リベンジ, Ribenji), and such students do not get financial rewards even when they win. The use of any weapons outside the stipulated sword is banned, though there has been at least one occasion when this rule is bent. Also, teams A-ranked and above are allowed to modify their weapons. Breaking rules can result in points being deducted from a team, with harsher punishments like confinement for severe offenses. Other known violations are the unsheathing of swords for non-regulation reasons and using modified weapons outside stipulated areas.

=== Ranking ===
The lowest shown rank is D, followed by C through A, then "Special A" and S. Rising in rank earns a team 1,000,000 yen. Students under the rank of A are restricted from entering designated areas of the school that only those A-ranked and above can enter, presumably for their safety. Little is known of these areas, as they are blocked by walls and guards. S-ranked students are part of the student council—the "S" is said to stand for "Student Council" (生徒会, Seitokai). Council members wear a uniform distinctly different from other students, and have been shown carrying out duties such as planning events. Duels for the position of student council president have more complicated rules. These duels are limited to council members only, with the defeated party given a choice between an unlimited number of future challenges or to forfeit their sword-bearer status.

=== Sisters-in-Arms ===
Teams are referred to as sisters-in-arms (刃友, shinyū), while the relationship between two partners is also addressed as such. The term sounds similar for that used to describe close friends in Japanese, shinyū (親友). Two students enter a pact via an application to the school administrative staff and exchanging the rings attached to the hilts of their swords. This is seen as a deep commitment much like the "marriage" that it symbolizes, and there have been occasions when sisters-in-arms are called "husband", "wife", or some variation thereof.

When the pact between sisters-in-arms is dissolved, the number of stars they had gained up until that point is divided equally among them. On the other hand, if two students enter a pact with different numbers of stars, their ranking is also affected. A lower-ranked student pairing up with a higher-ranked student will have a higher position due to the greater average of points earned as compared to a team of the same rank. The opposite applies if a student is higher-ranked than her new partner.

== Media ==
=== Manga ===
Hayate × Blade began as a manga series written and illustrated by Shizuru Hayashiya which started serialization in ASCII Media Works' shōnen manga magazine Dengeki Daioh on November 21, 2003, and ran in that magazine until May 21, 2008. The manga restarted serialization in Shueisha's seinen manga magazine Ultra Jump on August 19, 2008, and continued until July 2013. The reason for the switch was not explicitly explained, but the reason given was due to "various circumstances". Eight tankōbon volumes were released in Japan by ASCII Media Works under their Dengeki Comics imprint between June 26, 2004, and January 26, 2008, though Shueisha republished the eight volumes under their Young Jump Comics imprint featuring new covers, new character descriptions and revised panels. Shueisha published the remaining 10 volumes through volume 18 between December 19, 2008, and September 19, 2013. Seven Seas Entertainment licensed the manga for release in English, and the first six volumes were released between November 2008 and April 2010. As a result of the change of magazines in Japan, Seven Seas Entertainment lost the rights to continue publishing further English-language volumes of the manga series. A sequel manga, Hayate × Blade 2, began serialization in the September 2013 issue of Ultra Jump.

==== Volumes list ====
No.	Original release date	Original ISBN	English release date	English ISBN
01	June 26, 2004 (ASCII Media Works); August 19, 2008 (Shueisha)	4-8402-2739-X (ASCII Media Works); ISBN 978-4-08-877501-2 (Shueisha)	November 2008	978-0-7653-2181-7
001 "The Idiot Latecomer"; 002 "Wandering Idiot"; 003 "When Idiot Get Violent"; 004 "Idiot Aiming for the Top"; 005 "This Idiot Can Make It Through"; 006 "The Idiot Takes Off"
02	January 27, 2005 (ASCII Media Works); August 19, 2008 (Shueisha)	4-8402-2957-0 (ASCII Media Works); ISBN 978-4-08-877502-9 (Shueisha)	February 2009	978-0-7653-2182-4
007 "What Idiots Are After"; 008 "Impossibly Idiotic"; 009 "Only An Idiot"; 010 "Those Idiots Who Believe Will Be Saved"; 011 "Idiots & Airheads"; 012 "Made an Idiot for One Full Year"; 013 "A Festival for Idiots"
03	July 27, 2005 (ASCII Media Works); September 19, 2008 (Shueisha)	4-8402-3115-X (ASCII Media Works); ISBN 978-4-08-877518-0 (Shueisha)	May 2009	978-0-7653-2238-8
014 "What's Wrong with Being an Idiot"; 015 "She Who Rings the Bell is an Idiot"; 016 "Idiots Gather at the Center of the World"; 017 "Life Has Its ups, Downs & Idiots"; 018 "Stubbornness & Idiocy: Two Sides of the Same Coin"; 019 "Various Idiots"
04	January 27, 2006 (ASCII Media Works); September 19, 2008 (Shueisha)	4-8402-3320-9 (ASCII Media Works); ISBN 978-4-08-877519-7 (Shueisha)	August 2009	978-0-7653-2326-2
020 "Companions in Idiocy"; 021 "Wriggling Idiots"; 022 "Idiots Who Don't Get Along"; 023 "Between You & the Idiot"; 024 "Two Years on Idiocy Alone"; 025 "Battle for Idiots"; Bonus: "Idiots in Order"
05	July 27, 2006 (ASCII Media Works); October 17, 2008 (Shueisha)	4-8402-3535-X (ASCII Media Works); ISBN 978-4-08-877536-4 (Shueisha)	December 2009	978-0-7653-2392-7
026 "The Verge of Idiocy"; 027 "Idiot Explosion"; 028 "Idiots Can Overcome Everything"; 029 "Bustling Idiots"; 030 "Idiot a la Carte"; Missing chapter: "Forgotten Idiots"; Extra chapter: "Fill in Idiot"
06	January 27, 2007 (ASCII Media Works); October 17, 2008 (Shueisha)	978-4-8402-3751-2 (ASCII Media Works); ISBN 978-4-08-877537-1 (Shueisha)	April 2010	978-0-7653-2545-7
031 "Idiot Carnival"; 032 "Idiot Festival"; 033 "Idiot Survival"; 034 "Idiot Internal"; 035 "Idiot Rival"; 036 "Idiots Struggle"
07	July 27, 2007 (ASCII Media Works); November 19, 2008 (Shueisha)	978-4-8402-3964-6 (ASCII Media Works); ISBN 978-4-08-877556-2 (Shueisha)	—	—
037 "Idiot Revival"; 038 "Idiots Persist"; 039 "Sins and Idiots"; 040 "One-Shot Idiots"; 041 "God Save the Idiots"; 042 "Rock Around the Idiot"
08	January 26, 2008 (ASCII Media Works); November 19, 2008 (Shueisha)	978-4-8402-4176-2 (ASCII Media Works); ISBN 978-4-08-877557-9 (Shueisha)	—	—
043 "Idiots Move Three Steps Forward and Two Steps Back"; 044 "Idiots and Vacation"; 045 "Creeping Up Idiots"; 046 "Heat Up Idiot"; 047 "Tenchi's Mouth, Idiot's Paradise"; Missing chapter: "Monopoly! Idiot's Sixty Minutes"; Extra chapter: "Hurtful Idiot"
09	December 19, 2008	978-4-08-877575-3	—	—
Missing chapter: "Idiocy Cannot Be Cured No Matter How Many Times You Try"; 048 "Merry Christmas, Mister Idiot"; 049 "Written as Serious, Read as Idiot"; 050 "The Sky that Idiots See and the Depth of the Earth"; 051 "The One Who Becomes an Idiot, that Guidepost"; 052 "Hit the Road, Idiot"; 053 "The Idiot Arrived Suddenly"; 054 "The Star that the Idiot Dropped"; Extra chapter: "Idiots and Strolling"
10	June 19, 2009	978-4-08-877657-6	—	—
11	October 19, 2009	978-4-08-877750-4	—	—
12	June 18, 2010	978-4-08-877864-8	—	—
13	October 19, 2010	978-4-08-879053-4	—	—
14	August 19, 2011	978-4-08-879160-9	—	—
15	November 18, 2011	978-4-08-879231-6	—	—
16	June 19, 2012	978-4-08-879340-5	—	—
17	December 19, 2012	978-4-08-879486-0	—	—
18	September 19, 2013	978-4-08-879603-1	—	—

=== Drama CDs ===
Three drama CDs based on the manga series were released by Frontier Works in collaboration with Geneon between March 24, 2006, and May 21, 2008. Bonus tracks are included on each CD, where the voice actors talk while out of character. Also, the booklets for the drama CDs have short, presumably non-canon strips by Shizuru Hayashiya. The first drama CD covers the events of the first manga volume, plus two extra tracks covering original material. The second drama CD covers major events during the school festival. The third drama CD features original material, with most recurring cast members being voiced in at least one track.
