= International Arthur Grumiaux Competition for Young Violinists =

Violin competition

Arthur Grumiaux International Violin Competition
- Venue: Royal Conservatory of Brussels, Belgium
- Presented by: Musiq'3
- First award: 2008; 18 years ago
- Website: www.agivc.eu

The Arthur Grumiaux International Violin Competition is a violin competition held in Brussels, Belgium. First held in 2008 under the name of "Bravo", in 2015 the competition was renamed in honor of the violinist Arthur Grumiaux. The competition takes place at the Royal Conservatory of Brussels in Belgium.

== History ==
The competition was created in 2008 at the "Institut Supérieur de Musique et de Pédagogie in Namur", originally under the name of "Bravo!" competition. It took place each year at the Institut and since 2017 in the Royal Conservatoire in Brussels. In 2015, the competition was supported by the foundation Baron Arthur Grumiaux and was renamed International Arthur Grumiaux Competition for Young Violinists. The same year, Princess Léa of Belgium rewarded the winners at the Royal Theater of Namur. The competition is international and was represented in 2016 by 27 different nationalities

Since 2016 edition, Musiq'3 became the official partner of the project and in the same year, the Belgian TV news RTBF show a spot on television

== Prize winners ==
There are three age categories : Category I (0-11 y.o.), Category II (12-16 y.o.) and Category III (17-21 y.o.)

| Year | 1st Prize Cat A | 1st Prize Cat B | 1st Prize Cat C | 1st Prize Cat D | Special Prize |
|---|---|---|---|---|---|
| 2022 | (Korea) KANG Tae Kyum (Grand prize) | 1st prize was not awarded | (China) Xiaozhuo Wang | 1st prize was not awarded | |
| 2019 | (Japan) Himari Yoshimura (Grand prize) (Vietnam) Nguyen Le Nguyen (Bulgaria) (Japan) Kai Gergov | (United States) (Romania) Bianca Ciubancan (Turkey) Naz Irem Turkmen | (Japan) Kyota Kakiuchi | (Japan) Ayaka Uchio | (Switzerland) Samuel Hirsch (Best interpretation of a Belgian piece) |
| 2018 | (Korea) EunSeo Cho (Korea) SungWoo Lee (Bulgaria) Viktor Vasiliev | (Germany) Leonard Toschev (Belgium) Pauline Van Der Rest | (Denmark) Michael Germer | (France) Emma Gibout | (Denmark) Michael Germer (Special jury prize ) (United States) Ariel Horowitz (Best interpretation of a Belgian piece) |
| 2017 | (Japan) Fiona Khuong-Huu | (Japan) Ryota Nakamura (Singapore) Yunci Kaelyn Soh | (Ukraine) Georgii Moroz (Hungary) Pal Laszlo Szomora | - | (Belgium) Meurice Victorine (Special Prize – Young Hope ) (Ukraine) Georgii Moroz (Best interpretation of a Belgian piece) |
| 2016 | (Turkey) Bade Daştan | (Belarus) Aliaksandra Arbuzava (Serbia) Veronika Mona Bogic | (Japan) Emiri Kobayashi (Turkey) Ilgin Top | (Japan) Yurina Arai | (Japan) Emiri Kobayashi (Best Interpretation of a Belgian piece) (Israel) Avraham Tirfe (Encouragement) (Syria) Bilal Alnemr (Dora Schwarzberg Prize) |
| 2015 | (Japan) NAKANO Lina (Grand prize) (Turkey) ÇATAKOĞLU Gökçe (Belgium) KIM Theodore | (Austria) KARLS Lorenz (France) FAULISI Luka | (Italy) CARDAROPOLI Gennaro | (Romania) RIMBU Remus | (Netherlands) Spruit Charlotte (Best Interpretation of a Belgian piece) (Mongolia) Lut Bilegtugs (Dora Schwarzberg Prize) |
| 2014 | (Belgium) VAN DER REST Pauline (Grand prize) (Ukraine) BLYUMIN Matviy (Austria) LIST Darya | (Austria) SCHMÖLZER Eva Lucia (France) WAKAMATSU Hana Lucia | (Austria) TING Belle Chang-Yuan | (Belgium) DEBROEYER Quentin | (Austria) Belle Ting (Best Interpretation of a Belgian piece) (Germany) Anne Friederike Greuner (Best Interpretation of a Belgian piece) |
| 2013 | (Belgium) Cooreman Alexandra (Grand prize) (Ukraine) Vasylieva Varvara (Russia) Yushkovskaya Maria | (Austria) Walder Julian(Grand prize) (Russia) Pashchenko Snezhana | (Azerbaijan) Ibrahimova Aytan (France) Durand-Rivière Suzanne | (Czech Republic) Šroubková Olga (Belgium) Michaluk Maxime | - |
| 2012 | (Switzerland) von Albertini Emilia (Grand prize) (France) Voisin Morgane | (Belgium) Csikos Anett | (France) Girard Grégoire | - | - |
| 2011 | (Sweden) Lozakovitj Daniel | - | (Belgium) Willem Floris (France) Decamps Sarah (Azerbaijan) Seyidova Jeyla | - | - |
| 2010 | (Germany) Guo Linda | (Latvia) Egorovs Andrels (Russia) Martynov Fedor | - | - | - |
| 2009 | (Germany) Boschkor Laras (Russia) Kuzmina Alexandra | (Belgium) Levy Maya | (Russia) Grauman Marina | (Spain) Managadze-Postnikova Nikolai | - |
| 2008 | (Hungary) (Belgium) Csikos Anett | (Hungary) (Belgium) Csikos Vilmos | (Korea) (Belgium) Lee Jae-Eun | - | - |

== Jury 2019 ==
1. Mr. Igor Tkatchouk – Belgium – President of the jury
2. Mrs Dora Schwarzberg – Austria
3. Mrs Shirly Laub – Belgium
4. Mrs Tetiana Zolozova – France
5. Mr. Roman Fedchuk – Czech Rep
6. Mr. George Tudorache – Belgium
7. Mr. Muhammedjan Turdiev – Turkey

== Previous years ==
1. Alexei Moshkov – Belgium (2012)
2. Anna Sundin – Sweden (2013, 2014, 2015)
3. Anne Léonardo – Belgium (2009)
4. Dora Schwarzberg – Austria (2013 to 2019)
5. Guido Jardon – Belgium (2008 à 2012)
6. Jean-Frédéric Molard – Belgium (2010, 2011)
7. Luba Aroutiounian – Belgium (2008)
8. Michel Poskin – Belgium (2009)
9. Muhammedjan Turdiev – Turkey (2014 to 2019)
10. Nina Nazymova – France (2013)
11. Philippe Descamps – Belgium (2011, 2012, 2013)
12. Roman Fedchuk – Czech Republic (2009 to 2019)
13. Saveliy Shalman – Russia (2009)
14. Shirly Laub – Belgium (2010, 2012, 2016, 2017, 2019)
15. Tatiana Samouil – Belgium (2008, 2012, 2013)
16. Tetiana Zolozova – France (2013 à 2019)
17. Ulysse Waterlot – Belgium (2010)
18. Valery Oistrakh – Belgium (2011)
19. Igor Tkatchouk – Belgium (Chairman 2008 to 2019)
