= List of Crayon Shin-chan volumes =

Japanese manga series

Crayon Shin-chan is a Japanese manga series written and illustrated by Yoshito Usui. It first appeared in 1990 in the Japanese weekly magazine Weekly Manga Action, published by Futabasha. It started as a spin-off of the character Shinnosuke Nikaido (二階堂信之介) of another series by Yoshito Usui, Darakuya Store Monogatari (だらくやストア物語). The chapters were collected into 50 tankōbon volumes, which were published under Futabasha's Action Comics imprint, from April 11, 1992, to July 10, 2010.

Yoshito Usui died on September 11, 2009, after a fall at Mount Arafune. After Usui died, Futabasha originally planned to end Crayon Shin-chan in November 2009. Upon discovering new manuscripts, Futabasha decided to extend the comic's run until the March 2010 issue of the magazine, which shipped on February 5, 2010. Although the series formally ended on February 5, 2010, it was announced on December 1, 2009, that a new manga would begin in the summer of 2010 by members of Usui's team, titled New Crayon Shin-chan (新クレヨンしんちゃん, Shin Kureyon Shin-chan).

A series of four bilingual Japanese-English manga were released in 1996 in Japan as Shin-chan The Little Horror! (クレヨンしんちゃんの楽しいゾ英会話).

ComicsOne translated ten volumes of Crayon Shin-chan into English and released it in the United States. Occasional pop culture references familiar to Americans were added to increase the appeal to American audiences. The manga is mirrored from its original to read from left to right. Starting with the sixth volume, many of the names were changed to the ones used in the Phuuz English version of the anime, even though the dub never aired in North America. This translation is rated Teen.

Since then, American publisher DrMaster took over the licenses of several manga series, including Crayon Shin-chan, from ComicsOne. No new volumes of Crayon Shin-chan were released under the DrMaster imprint.

On July 28, 2007, DC Comics' manga division CMX announced the acquisition of the Crayon Shin-chan manga. The CMX version is rated Mature instead of Teen from ComicsOne, because of nudity, sexual humor, and bad language. The first volume was released on February 27, 2008, with uncensored art, and the style of jokes that frequent the Adult Swim dub with some throw backs to the original version, such as his original greeting. However, volume 10 omitted a gag which was in the ComicsOne version.

On April 11, 2012, One Peace Books announced their release of the manga, which is a reprint of the CMX version, in an omnibus format. Three omnibus volumes were released simultaneously on October 15, 2012. Volume 4 was released on November 13, 2013, and included the Japanese volume 12, marking the first time that particular volume has an English translation.

The Crayon Shin-chan manga spin-off, Action Mask, is currently available as read-only/print-only subscription from Crunchyroll and Futabasha. The main Shin-chan manga is also available from Crunchyroll using the CMX version, concurrently up to volume 10.

== Crayon Shin-chan - Japanese original ==
No.	Release date	ISBN
1	April 11, 1992	4-575-93292-2
2	June 12, 1992	4-575-93298-1
3	August 8, 1992	4-575-93304-X
4	November 12, 1992	4-575-93316-3
5	March 12, 1993	4-575-93324-4
6	July 27, 1993	4-575-93340-6
7	December 9, 1993	4-575-93347-3
8	March 28, 1994	4-575-93358-9
9	July 26, 1994	4-575-93368-6
10	December 9, 1994	4-575-93377-5
11	April 14, 1995	4-575-93391-0
12	July 18, 1995	4-575-93404-6
13	October 26, 1995	4-575-93419-4
14	March 22, 1996	4-575-93439-9
15	July 18, 1996	4-575-93457-7
16	December 6, 1996	4-575-93478-X
17	April 15, 1997	4-575-93496-8
18	July 16, 1997	4-575-93511-5
19	December 12, 1997	4-575-93542-5
20	April 17, 1998	4-575-93560-3
21	July 22, 1998	4-575-93576-X
22	December 8, 1998	4-575-93597-2
23	April 8, 1999	4-575-93611-1
24	July 27, 1999	4-575-93634-0
25	December 8, 1999	4-575-93661-8
26	April 13, 2000	4-575-93682-0
27	July 25, 2000	4-575-93703-7
28	December 8, 2000	4-575-93721-5
29	April 18, 2001	4-575-93734-7
30	July 12, 2001	4-575-93746-0
31	December 14, 2001	4-575-93765-7
32	April 10, 2002	4-575-93774-6
33	July 18, 2002	4-575-93792-4
34	December 12, 2002	4-575-93810-6
35	April 17, 2003	4-575-93824-6
36	July 19, 2003	4-575-93841-6
37	December 12, 2003	4-575-93868-8
38	April 15, 2004	4-575-93888-2
39	July 24, 2004	4-575-93898-X
40	December 18, 2004	4-575-93920-X
41	April 15, 2005	4-575-93945-5
42	July 23, 2005	4-575-93959-5
43	December 16, 2005	4-575-93985-4
44	July 14, 2006	4-575-94020-8
45	December 8, 2006	4-575-94053-4
46	July 13, 2007	978-4-575-94110-4
47	December 14, 2007	978-4-575-94142-5
48	July 25, 2008	978-4-575-94182-1
49	July 17, 2009	978-4-575-94234-7
50	July 16, 2010	978-4-575-94289-7

== New Crayon Shin-chan - Japanese original ==
No.	Release date	ISBN
1	July 13, 2012	978-4-575-94354-2
2	July 12, 2013	978-4-575-94385-6
3	July 10, 2014	978-4-575-94415-0
4	July 8, 2015	978-4-575-94454-9
5	December 3, 2015	978-4-575-94463-1
6	July 23, 2016	978-4-575-94480-8
7	July 25, 2017	978-4-575-94504-1
8	July 26, 2018	978-4-575-94531-7
9	July 24, 2019	978-4-575-94549-2
10	August 20, 2020	978-4-575-94573-7
11	August 11, 2021	978-4-575-94592-8
12	August 10, 2022	978-4-575-94608-6
13	August 4, 2023	978-4-575-94621-5
14	August 9, 2024	978-4-575-94626-0
15	August 7, 2025	978-4-575-94629-1
16	July 30, 2026	978-4-575-94633-8

== Shin-chan: The Little Horror! (Crayon Shin-chan's Fun English Conversation) ==
No.	Release date	ISBN
1	March 1994	4-575-93355-4
2	March 1994	4-575-93356-2
3	March 1996	4-575-93443-7
4	March or July 1996	978-4-575-93458-8

== Crayon Shin-chan - English - ComicsOne ==
No.	Release date	ISBN
1	04/04/2005	978-1-588-99194-2
2	04/04/2005	978-1-588-99266-6
3	04/04/2005	978-1-588-99267-3
4	04/04/2005	978-1-588-99270-3
5	04/04/2005	978-1-588-99268-0
6	04/04/2005	978-1-588-99269-7
7	04/04/2005	978-1-588-99271-0
8	04/04/2005	978-1-588-99272-7
9	04/04/2005	978-1-588-99273-4
10	04/04/2005	978-1-588-99274-1

== Crayon Shin-chan - English - CMX ==
No.	Release date	ISBN
1	02/27/2008	978-1-401-21715-0
2	05/13/2008	978-1-401-21716-7
3	07/15/2008	978-1-401-21774-7
4	09/02/2008	978-1-401-21778-5
5	10/28/2008	978-1-401-22025-9
6	12/30/2008	978-1-401-22031-0
7	03/03/2009	978-1-401-22110-2
8	04/28/2009	978-1-401-22111-9
9	09/01/2009	978-1-401-22098-3
10	01/19/2010	978-1-401-22102-7
11	05/04/2010	978-1-401-22101-0

== Crayon Shin-chan - English - One Peace Books ==
No.	Release date	ISBN
1	October 15, 2012	978-1-935-54813-3
2	October 15, 2012	978-1-935-54814-0
3	October 15, 2012	978-1-935-54815-7
4	November 15, 2013	978-1-935-54839-3

== Action Mask (spin-off) ==
No.	Release date	ISBN
1	January 10, 2014	978-4575843293
2	April 10, 2014	978-4575843798
3	October 10, 2014	978-4575845020
4	March 10, 2015	978-4575845860
5	August 10, 2015	978-4575846652
