= Yi Huan =

Taiwanese comic creator

- Born: 19 October 1969 (age 57) Keelung, Taiwan
- Pseudonym: I-Huan
- Notable works: Real/Fake Princess; Divine Melody

Yi Huan (Chinese: 依歡; born 19 October 1969), occasionally credited as I-Huan, is a Taiwanese comic creator of manhua aimed at girls. She has written and illustrated many series, two of which have been licensed for publication in English.

== Biography ==
Yi was born October 19, 1969, in Keelung, Taiwan. After graduating from law school in 1992, she joined the staff of Tong Li Comics as an editor. In 1994, she won a contest for new artists and then began her career as a professional comics creator. Her first professional manhua, Proclaiming and Loving, was published in 1995.

== Publications ==
Yi has written and illustrated numerous manhua, many published by Tong Li. Titles include:

- Close To My Sweetheart (甜心零距離), currently serialized in Margret (瑪格麗特)
- Little Witch's Diary (小巫女的童話日記), 2005–2006
- Fantastic Tales (星月幻境), 2004–2005
- Divine Melody, currently serialized in Star Girls
- Real/Fake Princess, 2002–2003
- Seal of the Sacred Moon (聖月之印), 2001–2005
- Spirit of the Ocean (碧海精灵), 1997–1999
- Secret (秘密), 1996
- Proclaiming and Loving (宣和戀), 1995–1996

Real/Fake Princess has been released in its five-volume entirety in English by DrMaster. DrMaster has also licensed Divine Melody and will begin its release in January 2009. Yi's comics have also been translated and distributed in Thai, Vietnamese, Hungarian, Korean, and Russian.
