= Youth Gone Wild (manhua) =

Manhua series by Nicky Lee

- Cover of Youth Gone Wild volume 1

搖滾狂潮
- Genre: Comedy, Drama, Romance, shoujo
- Author: Nicky Lee
- Publisher: Tong Li Comics (Taiwan)
- Magazine: Star Girls (Taiwan)
- Collected volumes: 14

Youth Gone Wild (Chinese: 搖滾狂潮), is a 14 volume manhua series by Taiwanese author Nicky Lee, (Li Chung Ping). Published by Tong Li, the literal translation of '搖滾狂潮' is 'Rock Fever' or 'Raging Tide', though the comic's official English language title is Youth Gone Wild.

The story, dated only by its frequent references to music talents such as Guns N' Roses, Bon Jovi, Garbage and of course Skid Row, follows the lives of a group of young rock musicians hoping to make the big time.

== Overview ==
Lan YaTing wishes to be the manager of the greatest band in Asia, or maybe even the world. The problem is she keeps getting in trouble with the bands that she manages for a large firm. Eventually she is fired due to her strong willed spirit. Of course it is only then that she meets up with a bunch of characters who, amazingly enough, can play music.

== Characters ==
- Lan Ya-Ting: Manager: A headstrong woman whose dream is to become the number one manager of a rock band that will change rock and roll forever. She realized that her dream might come true after finding the present members of Death. Currently she is in a romantic relationship with Wang Xiang.
- Wang Xiang: Lead Vocalist: A normally cheerful guy who at first was just working odd jobs. After Lan Ya-Ting scouted him he joined Death rather reluctantly and had to train very hard in order to satisfy Shang Guan-Fei. Although he is Lan Ya-Ting's boyfriend he still admires other women and as a result receives evil glares from Ya-Ting.
- Shang Guan-Fei: Guitar, is dating Xiao Fie. He is a self-proclaimed guitar god who joined reluctantly after deciding Ya-Ting was his girlfriend. He is verbally abusive to anyone around him especially Wang Xiang and extremely hot-headed and temperamental. He occasionally gets along with the others. He came from a wealthy background, but his narcissistic personality is due to his unhappy childhood where he was an unwanted middle child. His relationship with this elder brother who is also the band's producer is quite explosive.
- Luo Kai: Drums, is dating WenLi Vivien. Kai is more beautiful than most girls in terms of looks. He is the most "normal" member of the group and is level headed, sarcastic and downright blunt at times. He is caring towards his best friend from high school, Zhi-Gao, convincing the latter to leave behind his misery and join the band after Zhi-Gao ran away from him on meeting after several years. Many fans think they are a couple although Kai has a girlfriend. He comes from a rich family as well causing his friends to question why he is a drummer. He was best friends with Zhi in high school and is the only person who can touch him physically.
- Ji Zhi-Gao: Bass Guitar. Zhi is the quiet "mysterious" member of the group. Once passionate about music he was raped by his music mentor several years before the series when he was in high school. This left him empty and emotionless and somewhat prone to getting in trouble until Kai convinced him to join. He saves a fan, Yui Yui, from being raped, and she develops a strong one-sided infatuation with him. He is uncomfortable at being touched by people, especially males. He was best friends with Kai in high school, but they fell out of touch when he moved away. He is wealthy as well.
- WenLi Vivien: Photographer
- Xiao Fie: solo singer, is dating Shang Guan-Fei
- Shang Guan-Yi: Producer, older brother of Shang Guan-Fei. A very effeminate, amoral and perverted yet calmer version of Shang Guan-Fei. He enjoys putting down his brother and breaking his self-confidence. The truth is he has a fetish for making his brother's life miserable and actually does love him underneath his antagonism. He is also bisexual. He is somewhat psychotic sabotaging his bands and his reputation before eventually recovering them
- Yang Jia-Jia: Teen Idol
