= The Other Side of the Mirror =

The Other Side of the Mirror may refer to:

- The Other Side of the Mirror (album), an album by Stevie Nicks
- The Other Side of the Mirror (film), a film by Murray Lerner; also known as The Other Side of the Mirror: Bob Dylan at the Newport Folk Festival
- The Other Side of the Mirror (manhua), a comic by Jo Chen
- The Other Side of the Mirror (anthology), an anthology of stories set in Marion Zimmer Bradley's Darkover universe
