= Divine Melody =

Taiwanese comic series by Yi Huan

- Cover of Divine Melody vol. 1 (2003), art by Yi Huan

仙曲 Xiān qǔ
- Genre: Romantic fantasy
- Author: Yi Huan
- Publisher: Tong Li Comics (Taiwan)
- English publisher: US: DrMaster
- Other publishers: Nhà Xuất Bản Trẻ (Vietnam) Comics Factory (Russia)
- Magazine: Star Girls (Taiwan)
- Original run: 2003 – Present
- Collected volumes: 9

Divine Melody (Chinese: 仙曲; pinyin: Xiān qǔ) is a Taiwanese manhua comic series written by Yi Huan. It is published in Taiwan by Tong Li Comics and was distributed in English in 2009 by DrMaster.

== Plot ==
Divine Melody is the story of Cai Sheng, a young female fox demon. When a human boy and girl save her from a dog attack, Cai Sheng's caretaker, Hui-Niang marks the pair with special symbols, which will not disappear even when they are reincarnated, so that Cai Sheng may one day repay her life debt to them. Two hundred years later, Cai Sheng has mastered the ability to transform into a male demon, and while in this form, she meets reincarnated versions of the boy and girl from long ago. In order to repay her debt, she decides to play matchmaker for the pair, but the girl begins to fall in love with Cai Sheng's male form, and the boy with her female form.

The story follows Cai-Sheng a Fox-Spirit, when she finds Han and Ping-er, reincarnated and who no-longer know her. She then decides to stay with them, to try and repay her depts. But many struggles come to face her, such as when it's revealed her male form is a Fairy/Demon hybrid, and that she's descended from a Nine-Tailed Fox Demon. All she wants, is to fall in love and have a family, even if it means giving up her Immortality. The worst happens, when Han discovers that Cai-Sheng killed his master and wouldn't tell him, though he later understands why.

The series ends when Cai-Sheng meets Wei-Tzu's, the man she loves, reincarnation, and who is revealed to be Ping and Han's grandchild.

== Divine Melody Other Story ==
A sequel roughly translated as Divine Melody: Chapter of warm snow is currently serialised in Star Girls. It follows the adventures of Cai Sheng during the last chapter of Divine Melody.

== Characters ==
Qin Cai Sheng: The protagonist of the series, it is a divine fox with the capability to switch between male and female forms. Primarily in the female form, it is commented that her female form exhibits the characteristics of a fox demon, namely, seduction. Her male form has been commented to be more celestial-like, and she should be in this form in the presence of any other celestials. She seeks to have bonds/relationships like humans, and is willing to give up being a celestial/immortal to spend limited life with a loved one. She originally loved Hui Niang, but at the end of the series, she falls in love with a human, Wei zi Qiu, who then dies, and is reborn.

Han Yun Shi: A taoist priest in training, but lacking in both power and talent. He is the reincarnated form of the boy who saved Cai Sheng from the dog attack. Loves the female Cai Sheng, but he later marries Ping-er, and has a family with her.

Su Ping'er: A well-bred lady. She is the reincarnated form of the girl who saved Cai Sheng from the dog attack. Ping-er was, at one stage, a Demon but Han manages to bring her back. Loves the male Cai Sheng, but she eventually marries and has a family with Han.

Wei zi Qiu: A celestial in training charged with convincing Cai Sheng to return to the celestial world. If he fails to do so and Cai Sheng becomes a demon, he is to slay her. He later becomes a human again, and dies in Cai-Shengs arms. He's then reborn as Ping-er and Han's grandchild, and meets Cai-Sheng when she's hiking one day.

Bo Leng: A ruthless priest that kills fox demon without discretion, even if they have become human. He finds pleasure in collecting the tails of the fox-spirits he slays. He is very interested in slaying Cai Sheng and obtaining the former's tail. He sold the Fox Clan in the mountain out, and led the villagers to it, where they set the place alight and killed all the foxes bar one: Yuu-Niang.

Hui Niang: A fox spirit who gave it all up for her human husband. Cai Sheng loved her but she kept turning her male form down. She died when she was framed for killing a bunch of humans by Gui-Miao, and her two children died with her.

Gui Miao: A cat spirit that was created by the Demon Fox, who implanted her soul into her human owner's body. She lived as a Human for years, until she was found out, and then ran away with her human family. She eventually had to leave 'her' parents, but turned back to find that they killed themselves to keep her safe. At the end of the Manga, it's revealed that Gui Miao was accepted into training to become a Fairy, and is still forlorn that she can't become a Human.

== Comic ==
Divine Melody is currently serialized in Star Girls. Publication of collected volumes in Taiwan by Tong Li Comics began in 2003. As of July 2009, Divine Melody is complete at 9 volumes. DrMaster has announced it will be translating the series into English and distributing it bimonthly, starting in January, 2009. The series has also been released in Vietnamese by Nhà Xuất Bản Trẻ as Tiên Khúc and Russian by Comics Factory.
