= Real/Fake Princess =

Taiwanese manhua by Yi Huan

- Cover of Real/Fake Princess (真假公主 Zhēnjiǎ Gōngzhǔ) vol. 1 (2002), art by Yi Huan

真假公主 Zhēnjiǎ Gōngzhǔ
- Genre: Historical romance
- Author: Yi Huan
- Publisher: Tong Li Comics (Taiwan)
- English publisher: US: DrMaster
- Other publishers: Burapat (Thailand) Tre Publishing House (Vietnam) Delta Vision (Hungary)
- Original run: 2002–2003
- Volumes: 5

Real/Fake Princess (Chinese: 真假公主; pinyin: Zhēnjiǎ Gōngzhǔ) is a historical romance manhua comic series written and illustrated by Yi Huan. It was published in Taiwan by Tong Li Comics and distributed in the United States by DrMaster.

== Characters ==
Zhi Li- A

== Plot ==
Real/Fake Princess is set during the Jin Rebellions of China's Song dynasty. Fearing for her child's safety, the mother of infant Princess Yi Fu gives the child to a commoner, who then escapes with the baby to safety. Ten years later, peace is restored and the ruling house issues and edict to find the missing princess. Then the search advisor, Wu Zhong Lu, was confronted with a peasant girl with her guardian, Tan Hui. The peasant girl is then found out to be the missing princess, but goes by a different name. That name was given to her by Tan Hui it is called, Zhi Li. It means "separation". The girl does not wish to be a princess for it would mean being separated from her one-sided love for Hui. However, Wu Zhong Lu, gives in and promises her to restore Hui's status back up to a higher status so she could see him again. After many trials and fights between the two, it is seen that they both are falling in love with each other. Wu Zhong Lu's prostitute, Dai Xuan, is also in love with Wu Zhong, but notices that he has fallen hard for the princess.

== Comic ==
Real/Fake Princess was published in five volumes by Tong Li Comics in Taiwan, between 2002 and 2003. Extras included detailed historical notes and character profiles by Yi. The series was translated into English and distributed by DrMaster from 2006 to 2007. English translation was provided by Yun Zhao, with the adaptation by Ailen Lujo. The series has also been released in Thai by Burapat Comics as Princess of Zung Dynasty (องค์หญิงกำมะลอ), Vietnamese by Tre Publishing House as Công Chúa Lac Loài, and Hungarian by Delta Vision as Makrancos hercegnő.
