= Kurenai =

Kurenai may refer to the following:

- "Kurenai" (song), a song by the metal band X Japan.
- "Kurenai" (くれなゐ), a song by Tsuki Amano.

== Characters ==
- Kurenai Yuhi, a fictional character from the manga series Naruto.
- Tsubasa Kurenai, a fictional character from the manga series Ranma ½.
- Kurenai, the main character of the video game Red Ninja: End Of Honor.
- Kurenai, a faction of Broken Draenei in the computer game World of Warcraft.
- Maria Kurenai, a character from the manga series Vampire Knight.
- Wataru Kurenai, the main character in Kamen Rider Kiva.
- Otoya Kurenai, the father of Wataru Kurenai, in "Kamen Rider Kiva"

== Series ==
- Kure-nai, a light novel series by Kentarou Katayama and the subsequent manga and anime of the same name.
- Kurenai no Buta (Porco Rosso), a film directed by Hayao Miyazaki and produced by Studio Ghibli.
- Kurenai, the Japanese title of the manga Red Prowling Devil by Toshimitsu Shimizu.
