= Takamori =

Takamori may refer to:

== Places ==
- Takamori, Kumamoto, a town in Kumamoto Prefecture, Japan
- Takamori, Nagano, a town in Nagano Prefecture, Japan

== People with the surname ==
- Akio Takamori (1950–2017), Japanese-American ceramic sculptor
- Nao Takamori (高森 奈緒; born 1973), Japanese voice actress
- Natsumi Takamori (高森 奈津美; born 1987), Japanese voice actress
- Yasuo Takamori (高森 泰男; born 1934), former Japanese football player and manager
- Yoshino Takamori (鷹森 淑乃; born 1963), Japanese voice actress

== People with the given name ==
- Takamori Saigō (西郷 隆盛; 1828-1877), Japanese samurai and nobleman
- Takamori Yoshikawa (吉川 貴盛; born 1950), Japanese politician
