= Star Girls =

- Cover, Star Girls, no. 6
- Frequency: Bimonthly
- Publisher: Tong Li Comics
- First issue: July, 1992
- Country: Taiwan
- Language: Chinese
- Website: Star Girls

Star Girls (Chinese: 星少女; pinyin: Xīng Shàonǚ) is a Taiwanese anthology magazine published by Tong Li Comics specializing in serialization of manhua comics aimed at young females. It debuted in July, 1992, and is published six times per year in even-numbered months.

== Serializations ==
Star Girls has featured stories by Lai Ann, Nicky Lee, Jo Chen, I-Huan, and other popular Tong Li comics creators. Serializations as of 2008 include:

- The Internship of Angel (天使的人間實習) by Lai Ann, 2008
- Me and My Ainia by Lai Ann, 2007–2008
- Xia Ke Sing (霞客行) by Jun Xiao (Sheau Gin), 2007 - current
- The One by Nicky Lee, 2005–2014
- Divine Melody by I-Huan, 2003 - current
- The Other Side of the Mirror (manhua) by Jo Chen 1998–1999

== See also ==
- Media of Taiwan
