= Li Ren Man (manhua) =

Taiwanese manhua

儷人蠻 Lì rén mán
- Genre: Comedy, drama, historical, romance, smut
- Author: You Gui Xiu
- Publisher: Tong Li Publishing
- Original run: 2004–2005

Li Ren Man (儷人蠻) is a Taiwanese manhua written and illustrated by You Gui Xiu. It was first published by Tong Li Publishing in 2004.

== Plot ==
The manhua tells about Princess Hakunamatata, a Mongolian princess who is sent to China to marry the young Chinese emperor. However, the emperor already has a partner, and rejects the princess. After she arrives at the palace, Princess Hakunamatat starts creating lots of trouble, doing whatever she feels like. The empress marries her off to the emperor's uncle, in order to get rid of her. However, he also cannot put up with her. While the troublesome princess creates lots of hilarious incidents and funny moments, a conspiracy is developing at the palace. The fate of all the four characters is going to be changed forever.
