= Nicky Lee (author) =

- Born: Li Chung Ping (李崇萍); May 21

Li Chung Ping (李崇萍), who writes under the pseudonym Nicky Lee, is a popular Taiwanese manhua author. She writes primarily for the teenage girl market, specializing in comedy, drama and romance.

Lee works as one of the main staff artists for Taiwan's Tong Li Comics.

== Career ==
Lee began her career in the year 1992 when she submitted a story to Tong Li's monthly manhua magazine Flower Girl. The story became her first work, Paradise City and began Lee's long career working with Tong Li. Her second work, Youth Gone Wild, which started its five-year run in 1996, was her longest and most popular work. So far four works have been published in the magazine, one of which is ongoing.

Nicky Lee's personal life is not well documented aside from small notes that she writes in the margins of her published works and a few interviews. She is married, without children and credits her mother as her main influence. She is a fan of 1980s American heavy metal music and cites Fuyumi Souryo (Mars) and Shimizu Reiko as her role models.

== Works ==
- Paradise City (1993): 4 Volumes
- Youth Gone Wild (1996): 14 Volumes
- Provence (2004): 2 Volumes
- The One (2005): 17 Volumes
- Love Sing (2014): 1 Volumes Ongoing
