= Junk Force (manga) =

Japanese manga series

- First English edition of Junk Force as published by ComicsOne

ジャンクフォース (Janku Fōsu)
- Genre: Action
- Manga
- Written by: Hideki Kakinuma
- Illustrated by: Yusuke Tsurugi
- Published by: MediaWorks
- English publisher: NA: ComicsOne, DrMaster
- Magazine: Dengeki Comic Gao!
- Original run: February 27, 2003 – February 27, 2004
- Volumes: 3
- Light novel
- Written by: Hideki Kakinuma
- Illustrated by: Eeji Komatsu
- Published by: Media Factory
- English publisher: NA: ComicsOne
- Imprint: MF Bunko J
- Original run: July 2003 – December 2005
- Volumes: 5

Junk Force (Japanese: ジャンクフォース, Hepburn: Janku Fōsu) is a Japanese manga written by Hideki Kakinuma and illustrated by Yusuke Tsurugi with character designs by Eeji Komatsu. It was serialized in Dengeki Comic Gao!. The manga was licensed in English by ComicsOne before the license was transferred to DrMaster.

== Manga ==
The manga was released by MediaWorks between February 27, 2003, and February 27, 2004. The English release of the manga released the first of three tankōbon volumes on April 5, 2005.

=== Volume listing ===
No.	Original release date	Original ISBN	English release date	English ISBN
1	27 February 2003	978-4-84-022332-4	1 February 2004	978-1-58-899364-9
2	27 August 2003	978-4-84-022465-9	—	978-1-58-899365-6
3	27 February 2004	978-4-84-022625-7	—	978-1-58-899366-3

== Novels ==
The manga has been adapted into 5 novels, all written by Hideki Kakinuma and illustrated by Eeji Komatsu. The first three volumes were published in English by DrMaster.

No.	Original release date	Original ISBN	English release date	English ISBN
1	July 2003	978-4-84-010812-6	May 15, 2005	978-1-58-899312-0
2	January 2004	978-4-84-011024-2	September 19, 2005	978-1-59-796111-0
3	April 2004	978-4-84-011072-3	January 2, 2006	978-1-59-796019-9
4	October 2004	978-4-84-011157-7		
5	December 22, 2005	978-4-84-011430-1		

== Drama CDs ==
In January and March 2003, two Junk Force audio drama CDs were released by King Records in Japan. These CDs featured both new material and adaptations of stories featured in the manga and the novels. Professional voice actors were cast and possibly intended to be retained had the planned anime series reached fruition. The CDs are out of print.

The cast included:

- Sōichirō Hoshi – Louis
- Nana Mizuki – Liza
- Yū Asakawa – Wooty
- Ai Shimizu – Mill
- Hisayo Mochizuki – Mamet

== Reception ==
Mania.com's Eduardo M. Chavez commends the manga on character design and the translation of sound effects.

Theron Martin at Anime News Network commends the novel for "good extrapolation of future military tech" but criticises it for the author's "unsophisticated writing style". Mania.com's Mike Dungan criticises the poor translation done by DrMaster. However, he commends the author for putting "mecha-fanservice" into the novel.
