= Junk: Record of the Last Hero =

Japanese manga series

- North American cover by DrMaster

ジャンク
- Genre: Action, Science fiction, Superhero
- Manga
- Written by: Kia Asamiya
- Published by: Akita Shoten
- English publisher: NA: DrMaster
- Magazine: Champion Red; Champion Red Ichigo (Note: The last chapter only.)
- Original run: 2004 – 2007
- Volumes: 7

Junk: Record of the Last Hero is a manga series written and drawn by Kia Asamiya. The series was originally published in Japan in 2004 by the Akita Shoten's magazine Champion Red. It was brought to the United States in 2006 by DrMaster.

== Plot ==
The plot is about the Junk, a system which acts as a super-suit, and the people to whom the junk suits are given. At first, there were two units in the world, both in Japan; one white unit and one darker, black unit. However, it was revealed that a third JUNK type (red) was also created. The Black JUNK, White JUNK, and Red JUNK were all prototypes used by JUNK SYSTEMS to further develop the Blue JUNK(the production model). The eye style, according to Asamiya, "Is a mono-eye style.... but there's actually two eyes." The suits require an eight-hour charge up period, and only one hour of performance is delivered. Though the suits are free, users must fill out a report and send it to the manufacturer, which has not yet been named.

The story revolves around the two users of the Junk units, one of which is Hiro, who receives the black unit. The other unit goes to an unknown female user, though hints suggest it is Manami. It is actually revealed later that the White Junk actually goes to Manami's Stand in/bodyguard, Lisa. the story follows Hiro's maturation and adventures using the junk system, as he copes with the responsibilities and burdens it brings, as well as the changes in his life because of the suit.

JUNK is an acronym, which stands for Juriatic Union of Neo-Kinetics, the name of the company that is spearheading the JUNK development and deployment.

== Characters ==
=== JUNK users ===
The people given power suits called JUNK, allowed to do whatever they want with them as long as they hand in a set of data at least once a week to an organization eventually revealed as JUNK SYSTEMS. When the Black and White JUNKs made their appearance, they, Red JUNK and Blue JUNK were from then on called the "supermen." The Black, White and Red JUNKs were prototypes made for the eventual perfection of the mass-produced Blue JUNK model, to be used by JUNK SYSTEMS to destroy the current Japanese government and remake it into a new Bakumatsu era.

Hiro Yuuki
A high school student who has bullying issues. At the start of the story, he is a Hikikomori because of his depression and problems at school. He spends his time surfing the internet and stumbles across the Junk ad, which states that only the first two applicants will be accepted. He happens to be one of the two, and the company sends him a JUNK model. It is dark (grayish blue) in appearance, and seems to mirror Hiro's dark and moody personality. Hiro is well mannered, but reckless, and careless; since he doesn't read the manual, he does not know the capabilities of the JUNK. This leads him to not password-protect his account, so the other Junk user learns about him. Hiro is also attracted to friend and classmate, Ryoko, and at one point attempts to grope her when she visits him to ask whether he will go to school or not. Hiro's first act when receiving the JUNK is to go out and enjoy himself for the first time in months. His antics cause him to be caught on camera, and he likes the fact that he is on TV, and decides to tape all coverage of himself. He stumbles across a robbery, and stops it. However, he later uses the JUNK to get revenge on the bullies who tormented him. He overuses his power during his revenge, and when he returns home fleeing the police, an explosion results in the death of his parents. He moves in with Ryoko's family until he rents a new apartment with his parents' life insurance money. He contacts the White JUNK, who had saved him and Ryoko, to lure it out for a fight. During the fight, Hiro states that he will be a god that uses his power only to serve himself, which prompts the White JUNK to call him a Devil. He later starts to fight to protect others after he saves everyone at one of Manami's concerts, and is begun to be seen as a hero. This doesn't last long, as he has a relapse and destroys the publishing company's building that exposed his affair with Ryoko's mother, a result of which led to the family divorcing. This leads to him not only losing the support he had gained, but it also resulted in Tsujidou being replaced as Hiro's mentor by Ayano. His actions at the publishing company, his worrying about Ryoko's safety, and what he did to find and rescue her, shows that he truly does care for the well being of others, especially Ryoko. Hiro eventually decides to go back to school, though he has to start his past year over due to his extended absence, though he does manage to befriend his new classmate Ayu. He was approached to join the Koufuku organization, but was left alone when they realized he would be worthless to them, as he couldn't vote. When Tsujidou and the squadron of Blu JUNKs destroys the Koufuku organizations' headquarters, he manages to rescue Ayu from the flames and later attempts to help her return to normal. Though he decides to ultimately give up his JUNK in order to live, Anayo gave him back his JUNK when the Blue JUNKs took over the Diet building, and was approached by Fujiwara to defeat the Blue JUNKs in return for total forgiveness for his crimes. During his battle with Tsujidou, he makes clear his free will and ability to change, and defeats him. After he graduates, he moves to Okinawa to be with Ryoko. His transformation password is "Transform", and he is the only one of the JUNK wielders to still retain his JUNK suit.
Lisa
Lisa is the wielder of the White JUNK. She has been a fan of Manami since her debut, and wanted to become closer to her, even just a little. To achieve that, she undertook plastic surgery to get the same face as her. Since then, she has acted as her body double. As the White Junk user, she protects both Manami and all the innocent people that she can. Even though she received her JUNK at around the same time as Hiro, she is more experienced with it, able to use its systems to discover Hiro's identity right away. She is greatly displeased that the JUNK Systems company would give the JUNK to anyone like Suzuki, and believes that anyone who would use the JUNK for selfish purposes are Devils. When the Blue JUNK was released, all the other Junks were ordered returned, Lisa returned hers obediently, yet sadly, as she can no longer protect Manami. Her transformation password was never revealed in the manga.
Suzuki
A twenty-four-year-old man who is given the Red JUNK, an upgraded version of the Black and White JUNK models. First revealed in the 4 volume, his twisted sense of justice and way of dealing with "those in the wrong" lead him to be labeled as a murderer. He is also sadistic, as shown when he happily kills a floor full of his old co-workers while listening to music. His suit can emit lasers from its fingertips and use them as claws to slice buildings and people. Tsujidou kills him after he refuses to hand over the suit. His transformation password is "Shift".
Tsujidou
Tsujidou was the first person to monitor Hiro when he received the Black JUNK suit under the guise of a counselor. However, he is removed from this job when Hiro destroyed a publishing company building. He reappears in volume five, using a JUNK model based on the data collected on the Black, White, and Red JUNK models. The Blue JUNK is the approved suit that was soon going to be released to the public for military purposes. Tsujidou, along with JUNK SYSTEMS, planned to use the Blue JUNKs to start a revolution in Japan, so they started recalling the Black, White and Red JUNKs so that no one could stand against them. Ultimately, Tsujidou's plans were to destroy the current Japanese government and return it to that of the Bakumatsu era, due to his belief that the current youth of Japan are incapable of changing anything. However, when Hiro shows to him that he and the next generation can be willing to change themselves and grow up, he takes his attack head on. After giving Hiro a final speech and telling him to leave, he blows himself up. His transformation password is "Change".

=== Supporting characters ===
Ryoko
Hiro's friend and classmate. She is a good student and gives Hiro notes from school. She is unhappy, but not surprised, when Hiro says that he is going to quit school. it is suggested that Hiro is attracted to her when he attempts to grope her when she visits him. She is very sad for Hiro when he loses his parents, and forgives him for the incident after he moves in with her. Later on, she is kidnapped and eventually raped by a middle aged man, who Hiro as the Black JUNK swiftly beats unconscious. As a result of her rape, she has gained a phobia of men, though she is able to stand being around Hiro. When Hiro visited her in Okinawa, she asks him if he was the Black "superman" that saved her. Though he said he wasn't, she jumped off a cliff after saying that she was extremely sad that she wasn't saved sooner, forcing Hiro to transform in front of her and save her. However, her memory of this event, as well as the past few days, was erased by Ayano, though she retained the faint memory of Hiro visiting her. She is last seen staying in Okinawa with her mother and Hiro.
Fujiwara
A middle aged policeman who views Hiro's Black JUNK identity as a criminal. His brother was Hiro's first victim as the Black Junk wielder, so he is determined to arrest him. He eventually discovers the origins of the JUNK suits, though the police is taken off the JUNK case, so he can't do anything about it. When the Blue JUNKs take over the Diet building, he is given authority to give Hiro total amnesty for his crimes, as long as he defeats the Blue JUNKs. However, he makes it clear that he will never forgive Hiro for what he did. He is last seen saying farewell to Ayano and Natsuki, thanking them for their help.
Ayu Niiyama
Aya is a girl in Hiro's class when he starts attending school again. She has had feelings for him since the first day she met him, and is suspicious of Ayano's true relationship with Hiro, especially when she saw her kiss him. Her classmates tried to force her to join the Koufuku organization by offering her piles of money, but to no avail, thus forcing them to imprison her. In the end, she decides to join, and tries to force Hiro to join as well. When the Koufuku organization was destroyed, she is eventually "deprogrammed" and tries to return to the way she was before. She is last seen graduating with Hiro.
Ayano Hoshi
Anayo is an attractive, voluptuous woman from JUNK SYSTEMS, who openly and shamelessly talks about sex, especially with teenage boys. She became Hiro's new "counselor" after Tsujidou was fired. She is very attracted to Hiro, having sex with him on the day she met him, and shows jealousy when he thinks about other women. Her attraction to Hiro is a source of annoyance to him, especially when Ayu saw her kissing him at school, he had to make up the excuse that Ayano was his "kissing cousin," leading to her having to keep her attraction to a private level. She goes to great lengths to keep Hiro's identity as the Black JUNK a secret, even injecting someone with a serum that erases the past few days from a person's memory. She has a teaching license that she almost never uses, which explains why she became the new assistant teacher of Hiro's class. When the JUNKs are recalled, she reluctantly leaves him. However, she holds on to Hiro's JUNK, due to believing that he is meant to use it to stop Tsujidou and JUNK SYSTEMS' plan. Immediately after this, she faked her death along with Natsuki with help from Fujiwara. She and Natsuki are last seen deciding to leave Japan together.
Natsuki
The accomplice of Suzuki, Natsuki is an eighteen-year-old girl from JUNK SYSTEMS who works to keep Suzuki's identity secret. More often than not, she is greatly frustrated by Suzuki's violent actions, though she usually forgives him due to her being in a sexual relationship with him. Despite her pre-teen appearance, she hates to be called a child. She was given a device that can freeze Suzuki's suit and stop all its functions, in order to prevent him from killing any JUNK users. After Suzuki was killed, she runs away and goes into hiding first at Lisa's place, then at Hiro's apartment, out of fear that she will be killed because of Suzuki's murderous actions. While at Hiro's, she has begun to show an attraction to him and calling him "Darling", earning herself a rivalry with Ayano. When she hears that both Lisa and Hiro decided to return their respective JUNKs without a fight, she asks Hiro why he would so willingly give up that kind of power, even if it is to survive. During the Blue JUNK's attack, she faked her death along with Ayano with help from Fujiwara. She is last seen deciding to leave Japan with Ayano, suggesting they go to Bali as they have a lot of money.

=== Minor characters ===
Hiro's Father
Hiro's wisecracking father. He loves Hiro, obviously, and is very worried for him. He doesn't get much of a chance to be characterized, because when Hiro returns after the JUNK battle, he accidentally blows up his old house, losing his parents.
Hiro's Mother
Hiro's caring mom. She is worried that Hiro may have violent fantasies, or might commit a crime, but Hiro's father reassures her that to do that, he would have to leave his room. She too is killed when Hiro's home is destroyed.
Manami
A pop-star singer who Hiro thinks idolizes and admires. Throughout the first volume, there are hints that she is the pilot of the white Junk unit. However, in volume two it is revealed that her body double "Lisa" is the real owner of the White JUNK.
Ryoko's Mother
She takes Hiro in after he loses his parents, and is certainly worried for him. She offers to let him stay in her house as long as he needs to. He declines, saying that if does not move now, he never will. Later it is shown that they have been sleeping together in secret. After Ryoko is kidnapped and rescued, the tabloids release pictures of her sleeping with Hiro, causing Ryoko's father to divorce her and Ryoko and her mother to move to Okinawa to get away from the media.
Takuzo Ootake (Jura)
The Chief Secretary of the Democratic League, as well as the leader of the Koufuku organization, a religious sect that has a public image of offering aid to people in the form of food, clothing and money. He attempts to gain more "followers" by bribing them with large amounts of nearly indistinguishable counterfeit bills, and is not above forcing people to join through imprisonment. First mentioned in volume four, his group was behind the terrorist attacks involving exploding advertisement balloons, using the chaos to gain more supporters in order to topple the government of Japan. His group's headquarters, along with his counterfeits and ambitions, were destroyed by a group of Blue JUNK users, and was placed under arrest.

== Reception ==
Kevin King wrote in Booklist that the "dark, foreboding art perfectly fits the character's moods and state of minds". He suggested the novel as a way to "bridge the gap between manga and superhero comics". Jason Thompson from Otaku USA said "Asamiya's processed art is a good fit for the cold, inorganic story", and that Asamiya "allows his camera to drift over cityscapes and backgrounds, occasionally revealing subtle clues".

Bill Gray from Play Magazine stated that Asamiya "showcases a finely-honed talent for bringing to life characters that bleed and die and wrestle with moral and ethical ambiguity", and in Junk, there is no "black or white, no good guy or bad guy", but rather, Gray argues that the author has "created something far deeper and more complex ... he has shed a little light on the darkness that inhabits us all".
