= Maico 2010 =

Japanese manga series

- First US tankōbon volume cover of ComicsOne
- Manga
- Written by: Toshimitsu Shimizu
- Published by: Shōnen Gahosha
- English publisher: US: ComicsOne (formerly)
- Magazine: Young King
- Original run: 1997 – 1998
- Volumes: 4
- Anime television series

Android Announcer Maico 2010
- Directed by: Koji Masunari
- Produced by: Shiko Shirakawa; Yasushi Yoritsune
- Written by: Yōsuke Kuroda; Hideyuki Kurata; Hideki Shirane
- Music by: Motoki Funayama
- Studio: Group TAC
- Original network: WOWOW
- Original run: 6 April 1998 – 28 September 1998
- Episodes: 24

Maico 2010 is a manga series by Toshimitsu Shimizu which ran in Young King from 1997 to 1998. The manga was adapted to an anime television series on WOWOW that ran from April 6, 1998, to September 28 of that year titled Android Announcer Maico 2010 (Japanese: アンドロイド・アナ MAICO 2010, Hepburn: Andoroido Ana Maiko Nimaru-ichimaru) as part of the Anime Complex omnibus show. The series was published in English by ComicsOne. ComicsOne rated the series as "Suggested 17Up."

== Plot ==
Maico is Japan's newest radio DJ. When she is not working, she must stave off assassins, crazed fans and a couple of office workers as well. She believes she was created just to be the perfect DJ. What she does not know is that she is really a sexdroid — a robot specifically designed for sexual intercourse. However, her creator Otari Masudamasu wanted her to be as close to humans as possible and not a sex toy. Maico has never had sexual intercourse and is shy at times. She constantly learns about love and matters of the heart. She later meets another sexdroid Rei, Masudamasu's first android, who is designed to be like her late sister. After saving her from her evil controllers, who only used her to try to destroy Maico as a sex toy, she and Maico become crime fighting DJs called Cherry-Bombs. The anime version differs from the manga, in that it has fewer sexual themes, and no crime fighting involved. Also, there is no mention of her being a sexdroid, and Rei is never introduced.

== Characters ==
Maico
Voiced by: Sakura Tange
Maico's name stands for Multi-Artificial Intelligence Computer because she is 100% android, not a robot as the director always refers to her. One would think that an android used for a radio show would look boxy or metallic, but Maico is certainly not robotic looking, in fact, she looks like a normal, pink-haired girl. This causes a bit of tension with some of the male characters in the show and oddly enough with Maico as well. She is a very special android who learns from her experiences and reacts with as much emotion as any other human girl.
Densuke Matsuo (松尾 伝助, Matsuo Densuke)
Voiced by: Ryotaro Okiayu
He is a production assistant, seems to be one of Maico's greatest supporters and admirers. He helps Maico get situated in the first episode as well as keep the overall production going smoothly. Matsuo is the director's right-hand man and is usually used as a punching bag by the director when the show is not going as planned.
Izumi
Voiced by: Nao Takamori
She is the other production assistant, seems to nothing, but read up on the latest fashion magazines. Other than just "being there," Izumi will sometimes put a little bit of her own insight into situations that may help, or not.
Ryoko
Voiced by: Megumi Ogata
She is mostly quiet but seems to be the creator of the program Maico is utilizing to sound more human.
Mattsan (松つぁん)
Voiced by: Tōru Furusawa
The stressed director of the show, Matsuan keeps on using some hair growth spray to keep his precious hair from falling out. The director has a lot of "hair loss" moments as mishaps and mayhem happen in the studio on a regular basis.
Ume (梅)
The mysterious sound effects man, he communicates only in sound effects. A rather tall and muscly guy, Ume-san lends sound effects to the situations that arise at the station.
Suga (スガ)
Voiced by: Ken Narita
He is the scriptwriter and comes up with the lines that Maico has to say on a daily basis. Suga-chan seems to sleep most of the time and smokes a lot.

== Reception ==
Allen Divers of Anime News Network said that Maico 2010 is "a nice little romantic comedy with a bit of action and back-story through in to create a potential richer storyline" and "well drawn [artwork] accompanied by smooth writing, leading to an easily understandable and entertaining story." Divers said that Maico 2010's English translation "shows a lot of care, fitting smoothly with the action of the characters." The English version of the comic was flipped to the left to right format to fit the direction of the English language; while flipping can expose flaws in the artwork, Divers said that the English volumes did not reveal any flaws.
