= Dual! Parallel Trouble Adventure =

Japanese anime television series

- Official Dual! Parallel Trouble Adventure Blu-Ray cover in Japan

デュアル!ぱられルンルン物語 (Dyuaru! Parare Runrun Monogatari)
- Created by: Masaki Kajishima
- Anime television series
- Directed by: Katsuhito Akiyama
- Produced by: Kinya Watanabe; Hiroaki Inoue; Akio Matsuda; Mitsutoshi Kubota
- Written by: Yōsuke Kuroda
- Music by: Seikou Nagaoka
- Studio: AIC (Note: Production assistance (制作協力) for all episodes provided by Shaft.)
- Licensed by: NA: Discotek Media
- Original network: Wowow; AT-X
- English network: SEA: AXN; US: TechTV
- Original run: April 8, 1999 – July 1, 1999
- Episodes: 13 + OVA

Dual! Parallel Trouble Adventure (デュアル!ぱられルンルン物語, Dyuaru! Parare Runrun Monogatari) is a Japanese anime series animated by AIC and created by Masaki Kajishima, best known for the Tenchi Muyo! franchise. It was originally broadcast on Wowow from April to July 1999 and was licensed in the US by Pioneer LDC, later known as Geneon. In addition to the original TV run, an OVA special was added to conclude the series as a de facto "14th episode".

The title refers to the fact that the story takes place in two parallel universes, a concept loosely based on multiverse theory.

== Plot ==
22 years ago, a huge alien artifact is found on a construction site by a worker named Yotsuga. The foreman orders that the artifact be broken apart to avoid delays. As Yotsuga walks towards the dumpsters to dispose of a small piece of the artifact, the world splits into two. In one world, Yotsuga tosses away the piece and the artifact is destroyed. In the other world, Yotsuga keeps the artifact, leading to the discovery of extraterrestrial technology that changes history.

In the present, Kazuki Yotsuga is a high school student who is shunned by other students as an otaku; his web site describes battles between giant robots that only he can see, but it is mostly as a result of him being occasionally seen by the other students reacting to their "presence". One day, the most popular girl in school, Mitsuki Sanada, approaches him to tell him that she likes his stories. This is only a ruse; she lures him to her father, Dr. Ken Sanada, who wishes to study Kazuki for his research on parallel worlds.

After being thrown into the other possible world by Dr. Sanada's device (thanks to a careless action by Mitsuki), Kazuki finds himself still in Dr. Sanada's basement, but everything is covered with cobwebs. Kazuki goes home, is distracted by a real battle between two giant robots, one white and the other black. The white robot is knocked down and an injured female figure emerges from inside. When Kazuki goes to her aid, he is trapped inside the robot and somehow manages to activate it and defeat the enemy robot. Afterwards, Kazuki reaches his home, but his parents no longer recognize him. He is found by Mitsuki, who has followed him. Along with a military escort, she takes him to the Earth Defense Force HQ, a paramilitary operation led by this world's Dr. Sanada. After Kazuki learns of this world's situation and the attempted conquest of this world by this world's Dr. Rara (Dr. Sanada's arch-rival) who is using technology developed from the artifact, he volunteers to become a giant robot pilot.

Over the course of the series, Kazuki manages to attract several very different women without even trying, and he becomes a hero. He is later taken prisoner by Dr. Rara, the father of this world's Mitsuki. Mitsuki Rara eventually defects and comes to live with Kazuki and her counterpart. Later on, a new type of robot made from the artifact is deployed that can cause objects and people to be shifted between the alternate worlds. During the battle against it, Kazuki and Mitsuki Sanada are sent back to their original world, and they discover their world's Dr. Sanada covered up their disappearance by claiming that they had eloped. As it turns out, the frequent travel between worlds is taking a toll on the universe itself as the barriers separating them begin to break down; this will eventually lead to both worlds vanishing. A decision must be made; since Kazuki and the alien technology are exclusive to each world, one must be eliminated to halt the destruction. The robots are destroyed, and the worlds combine into one, an expression of Kazuki's wish for all his (girl)friends to continue to stay together with him (even though the action is again caused by Mitsuki's carelessness).

Masaki Kajishima, confirmed that DUAL! is in fact set in the distant past of the Tenchi Muyo! universe.

== Characters ==
Kazuki Yotsuga (四加一樹, Yotsuga Kazuki)

Voiced by: Takayuki Yamaguchi (Japanese); Jeremiah Freedman (English)

Kazuki is the main character of the series: a shy, quiet and awkward everyman, who possesses incredible fighting power and illogical charisma. As such, he attracts a bevy of beautiful women. Kazuki is regarded as a pariah by his classmates because he periodically has visions of giant robots battling in the city. After being accidentally sent to the parallel world by Ken and Mitsuki Sanada, Kazuki discovers that he is the only male that can control the mechas. Because of his unbelievable piloting skill, he is commissioned to the Earth Defense Force, or simply the EDF, and becomes the new pilot of the white Core Robot. His cover story at school is that he is Mitsuki's little brother, which gives Kazuki quite a bit of trouble.

Curiously, there is no alternative version of Kazuki Yotsuga in this world. Later in the series, Kazuki subconsciously awakens one of the original alien mechas, a robot named Zinv. It is revealed that Zinv is Kazuki's counterpart in the parallel world.

When Zinv is destroyed, Kazuki's desire for the group to stay together results in the creation of a third possible world, where elements from the parallel universes are combined.

Mitsuki Sanada (真田三月, Sanada Mitsuki)

Voiced by: Rie Tanaka (Japanese); Georgette Rose (English)

Mitsuki is the most admired girl in Kazuki's school; young men constantly send her gifts and cards, and Kazuki is nearly lynched for speaking to her. She lures Kazuki to her house for her father's experiments, and later follows him into the parallel world (for some reason arriving a month before he does). She is the daughter of both Ken Sanada and Ayuko Sanada in this world; however, she is in no way related to the Ken Sanada from the parallel world.

Mitsuki is also an exceptional robot pilot, and joins the EDF to end the war, hoping research to send her home can begin afterwards. Unfortunately, Mitsuki is hotheaded and easily manipulated, and is captured by the Rara Army towards the end of the series and coerced into piloting the complete version of HIMC.

She clearly has an attraction to Kazuki, but covers it up by treating him abrasively. When Kazuki is lost behind enemy lines, Mitsuki is affected most of all.

D (ディー, Dī)

Voiced by: Ai Uchikawa (Japanese); Katie Ashley (English)

D is a bioroid, an artificially constructed biological/mechanical being first introduced in the Tenchi Muyo! universe. The war between the Earth Defense Force and the Rara Army began when D and at least two mechas were discovered in an artifact of unknown origin. Her original body was damaged, so a bioroid was built to contain her essence (represented by a glowing orb in place of an eye) while her body healed.

D appears to be as inhuman as the robot she pilots, speaking mechanically and asking many questions about human emotions and behavior. The only one to break through her stony exterior is Kazuki, to the shock of Commander Sanada and Mitsuki. D frequently has visions of a horrible creature attacking, and is deathly afraid of HIMC.

She develops a strong attachment to Kazuki, culminating in her decision to return to her real body at the climax of the series in order to save him, at which she came to the realization that she was in love with Kazuki, a new feeling she had not experienced or understood before. It is then revealed that D stole Zinv and fled her world to escape HIMC and Kumu, who claimed the lives of her friends.

As a robot pilot, D is subpar, often requiring rescue by Kazuki and Mitsuki. However, she redeems herself by removing the limiter placed upon Zinv, allowing its true power to manifest itself.

When Zinv is destroyed and the worlds merge, D becomes Dee Sanada, taking on the animated personality of a young girl.

There is also an apparent resemblance between D and Tenchi Muyo! GXP character Neju na Melmas, leading some to believe that she and D may belong to the same race. The character of D also resembles the character Doll from Tenchi Muyo! War on Geminar. D will appear in the Tenchi Muyo! GXP OVA sequel Tenchi Muyo! GXP Paradise Shidō-hen.

Yayoi Schwael (弥生·シュバエル, Yayoi Shubaeru)

Voiced by: Chie Nakamura (Japanese); Ramona Lee (English)

Yayoi is the original pilot of the white Core Robot, which Kazuki named "Hartzenen". After suffering a serious head injury in battle, Yayoi experienced a feedback loop, effectively cutting off her connection to robots and ending her career as a pilot. Kazuki climbed into Hartzenen and took control, saving Yayoi's life. She refers to Kazuki as "her prince", and falls in love with him.

Yayoi goes to great lengths to spend time with Kazuki, signing up to be his combat instructor and school homeroom teacher, and even moving in next door to the Sanada home and building a passageway and door into Kazuki's room (immediately boarded up by Mitsuki). Her grandmother once tried to arrange a marriage for Yayoi to another man (due in part to Mitsuki Sanada's meddling), but her affection for Kazuki was too deep for her to even pay attention to the would-be suitor.

When Zinv is destroyed and the worlds merge, Yayoi is Kazuki's homeroom teacher, still living next door and usually entering the Sanada house through Kazuki's window (as a short cut), to Mitsuki (Sanada)'s annoyance.

Mitsuki Rara (羅螺みつき, Rara Mitsuki)

Voiced by: Megumi Toyoguchi (Japanese); Wendee Lee (English)

The Earth Defense Force knows her as "Miss Ra", the Rara Army's spokeswoman/mascot, but when Kazuki is injured and trapped behind enemy lines, it is revealed that she is Mitsuki Sanada's counterpart in the parallel world, the daughter of Hiroshi Rara and Ayuko Rara.

Mitsuki Rara could very well be Mitsuki Sanada's direct opposite. She is quiet, easily embarrassed and gentle; she personally nurses Kazuki back to health. However, she places herself in a trance to play Miss Ra, becoming a ruthless warrior. When she finds out that Kazuki is an enemy pilot, she launches him away in an escape pod, remembering the time he could have killed Miss Ra, but saved her instead.

Mitsuki is later brainwashed into piloting HIMC, one of the most powerful robots created. After Kazuki saves her, she resists returning home, eventually becoming a Core Robot pilot for the EDF. She comes the closest to capturing Kazuki's heart; the two almost go out on a date, which is unfortunately cancelled by U.N. officers intent on sending her home.

When Zinv is destroyed and the worlds merge, Mitsuki lives with her parents right next door to the Sanada home, but has a habit of sneaking in Kazuki's window via sleepwalking and spending most of her time in the Sanada home.

Ken Sanada (真田賢, Sanada Ken)

Voiced by: Ryūsuke Ōbayashi (Japanese); Kirk Thornton (English)

Ken has A and B versions: the eccentric scientist from our world, and the parallel world's commander of the Earth Defense Force. Ken is Mitsuki's father in this world, but is childless in the other world; naturally, he is quite confused when our world's Mitsuki calls him "Dad".

Both Kens share a love for instant ramen, a slightly off-color sense of humor, and an understanding that Kazuki is special. Despite appearing to goof off on the job (antagonizing Rara and Akane never gets old), Commander Sanada takes it quite seriously. When the U.N. turns against the EDF, his subordinates remain loyal to him, proving his worth as a leader.

When Zinv is destroyed and the worlds merge, Ken Sanada returns to being a scientist as well as being married to Akane Yamano. In the new world, Mitsuki Sanada is his daughter and Dee Sanada is his adopted daughter. His relation to Kazuki is cause for question. Kazuki calls him "Uncle" but it is debated among fans whether they are actually related in the new world.

Akane Yamano (山野茜, Yamano Akane)

Voiced by: Yuko Kobayashi (Japanese); Barbara Goodson (English)

The Earth Defense Force's United Nations advisor. Despite Akane's tendency to work "by the book", Ken and the young pilots often convince her to defy her orders, such as Rara's demand for the EDF to repatriate his daughter. When the EDF is outlawed, she resigns her post and flees with Ken Sanada and the others.

When Zinv is destroyed and the worlds merge, Akane becomes Ken's wife, as well as (unfortunately) Ayuko Rara's junior (as Ayuko was married to Ken previously), enabling Ayuko to insist on Akane's calling her "big sister".

Reika Nanjoin (Nanjoin Reika)

Voiced by: Nao Takamori (Japanese); Aline Leslie (English)

The grandmother of Yayoi Schwael, she exists only in the alternate world. She is a woman of some mystery, working for the EDF in some unknown (possibly classified) capacity but also acting as a matchmaker for eligible young ladies with a success rate of almost 100% (Yayoi is one of the very few that escapes one of her grandmother's matches, thanks to Kazuki and a Rara attack during the marriage interview). She embraces traditional values and is a woman of strong character and moral judgement, as demonstrated when she scolds Akane for allowing people to laugh at Kazuki when he is forced to wear a female disguise. She also cares very deeply for people and is revealed in the OVA to be a dog lover.

Hiroshi Rara (羅螺博士, Rara Hiroshi)

Voiced by: Kenichi Ogata (Japanese); G. Gordon Baer (English)

In our world, Rara is a Nobel Prize-winning scientist (previously in competition with Ken Sanada for that honor). In the parallel world, he is become something of a megalomaniac. It was he who began the war in the first place, transforming himself into a messiah-like figure ("You fools have no fear of God!", "the divine power of the Rara Army").

In the bizarre scene where Kazuki actually has dinner with the Rara family, the General reveals a softer side of himself; he believes that the war is about keeping the alien technology out of the wrong hands. However, it quickly becomes clear that Rara is simply a figurehead, with his wife wielding the real power. He redeems himself, however, when Kazuki attacks their base, and gets everyone out before it gets destroyed.

When Zinv is destroyed and the worlds merge, Rara and his wife move in next door to the Sanadas, hoping to corral Kazuki into revealing the secret of his connection to Zinv (one method being to get Kazuki into a situation where he would have to marry Mitsuki Rara).

Ayuko Rara (羅螺鮎子, Rara Ayuko)

Voiced by: Mika Doi (Japanese); Diva West (English)

Ayuko was both Rara and Sanada's wife in the two worlds, and is the mother of both Mitsukis. In the parallel world, she manipulates events while behind the scenes, posing as Rara's submissive wife. In reality, she controls the Rara Army along with the mysterious alien named Kumu. She exploits Mitsuki Sanada's love of Kazuki to convince Mitsuki to turn against the EDF. Ultimately, both Ayuko and HIMC are defeated by Kazuki and Zinv.

When Zinv is destroyed and the worlds merge, Ayuko attempts to "arrange" Kazuki's marriage to her daughter, with humorous results.

Alice Shalom (アリス·シャローム, Arisu Sharōmu) Voiced by: Ryōka Yuzuki (Japanese); Lenore Zann (English), Mena Fitzgerald (ミーナ·フィッツジェラルド, Mīna Fīttsujerarudo) Voiced by: Ai Uchikawa, Ryla Phoenix (ライラ·フェニックス, Raira Fenikkusu) Voiced by: Yūko Katō

Mitsuki Rara's best friends. While initially teasing Mitsuki for her attraction to Kazuki, they help him escape the Rara base when his identity is revealed. Later, they give Kazuki her diary after a battle, letting him know Mitsuki's still thinking about him. The three later join Mitsuki Rara as pilots for the EDF.

When Zinv is destroyed and the worlds merge, Alice, Mena and Ryla return to working for the Raras.

Kaoru Hayase (早瀬薫, Hayase Kaoru)

Voiced by: Nao Takamori (Japanese); Anne Sherman (English)

A scientist in the employ of the Rara Army. She opposes the plan to force Mitsuki Rara to pilot HIMC, and warns her of her mother's machinations. Hayase later joins the Earth Defense Force and works alongside Ken Sanada.

Kumu

An alien being encased in a shrine in Rara's Garden, where it advises Ayouko Rara in the army's dealings with the Earth Defense Force late in the series. After the world merge, it is represented as a small female dog gifted to the Sanada's that has a penchant for biting Kazuki (whether out of affection or not is not quite clear).

== List of episodes ==
=== Series ===
No.	Title	Original release date	U.S. air date
Act. 01	"Life Sympathy"; Transliteration: "Raifu Shinpashī" (Japanese: ライフシンパシィ)	April 8, 1999	April 29, 2003
Kazuki can see what no one else can: a parallel world where giant robots battle and destroy the city. Mitsuki introduces Kazuki to her father Ken Sanada. He is a college professor that tinkers in high tech quantum physics in his basement during his spare time. Ken believes he's found the bridge between these parallel worlds and tests Kazuki to learn why he's the only one who can see it. The quantum portal machine is accidentally activated by Mitsuki and Kazuki is sent to the alternate world. Kazuki does not realize he's in the alternate world at first until robots almost step on him. When the Hartzenen robot falls in front of him during a battle, the injured female pilot stumbles out and collapses into Kazuki's arms. Kazuki is forced to activate the robot and enter the fight himself.
Act. 02	"My Home"; Transliteration: "Mai Hōmu" (Japanese: マイ·ホーム)	April 15, 1999	April 29, 2003
Kazuki goes to an empty store to buy medicine for the injured pilot, but the UN forces pick up the pilot and Hartzenen before he returns. Finding the pilot (whose name is Yayoi) missing, Kazuki searches through empty streets. Soon people begin to return to the city and Kazuki goes to his house, but none of his things are there and his parents don't know him. Soldiers, led by Mitsuki, take Kazuki into custody and bring him to Headquarters. Ken Sanada of this world greets him, then explains that he (Kazuki) does not exist in this world and Mitsuki is from his own world, but she arrived a month earlier. Ken Sanada is the UN leader of the Global Defense Force and the world is at war with the Rara army led by a fellow scientist named Hiroshi Rara. Mitsuki is a pilot of one of the core robots and figures if she fights to help end the war faster, Ken Sanada will have time to make the portal back to their original world.
Act. 03	"Illegal Guy"; Transliteration: "Irīgaru Gai" (Japanese: イリーガル·ガイ)	April 22, 1999	April 30, 2003
Kazuki is persuaded by UN Inspector Akane and Ken to be Hartzenen's pilot. Only females can pilot the robots, so they are amazed that a male can activate one. Kazuki meets the alien D. Kazuki practices using the robot and he pilots Hartzenon in battle with Mitsuki and D. He is terrified at first, but when D and Mitsuki are in trouble he forgets his fear and springs back to life to save them.
Act. 04	"No Disguise"; Transliteration: "Nō Dīsugaizu" (Japanese: ノーディスガイズ)	April 29, 1999	April 30, 2003
Ken Sanada, who is not Mitsuki's father in this parallel world, tells her that since Kazuki does not exist in this world, he has nowhere else to stay. Akane wants to keep Kazuki a secret from the enemy, so Ken designs a uniform that makes him look like a female. Kazuki goes along with it at first but when Ken introduces him to the others on the base they laugh their heads off. Embarrassed, Kazuki runs away and Akane traps him in one of the corridors, pleading with him to be reasonable and wear the suit. Escaping, Kazuki meets Yayoi, who returns the jacket he wrapped her up in when she was injured. Kazuki agrees to wear the female suit (but only for one time!) and Ken promises to have a male uniform made for him by the next battle.
Act. 05	"Campus Life"; Transliteration: "Kyanpusu Raifu" (Japanese: キャンパス·ライフ)	May 6, 1999	May 1, 2003
Kazuki attends school posing as Mitsuki Sanada's younger brother. A huge group of male students give him love letters for her and try to buy the lunch she made for him. Annoyed because he accepted all the love letters, Mitsuki makes him write a response to each one. The next day, Mitsuki is upset to learn D is moving in with them. Ken Sanada had put her in Kazuki's room, saying that it will improve morale between the pilots and D responds to Kazuki, so Mitsuki builds a wall to separate D and Kazuki. The gang takes care of some household chores and Mitsuki gets upset when D follows Kazuki's instructions instead of hers. Mitsuki is angry when D accidentally throws her diary away, but tells D it does not matter. D goes off in the rain to search for it and Mitsuki and Kazuki look for her. When Kazuki comes home he finds another door to his room. Mitsuki comes in and they both learn that Yayoi, who lives next door, will be part of their daily routine too.
Act. 06	"Intrigue"; Transliteration: "Intorīgu" (Japanese: イントリーグ)	May 13, 1999	May 1, 2003
Mitsuki is upset with Yayoi because she is taking over at home, at school and on the base. She sets up a plan to have Reika marry off Yayoi. Reika finds a wealthy businessman who is interested in marrying Yayoi, but the young woman protests getting married. Reika convinces her to at least meet with him – their families have been long-time friends. The meeting site is near a Rara army battle zone and Ken and Akane want Reika to cancel the meeting but she refuses. Mitsuki assures Reika that the Rara army will not cross the four mile (6 km) limit to disturb them. On the day of the battle, Kazuki fights the enemy close to the four mile (6 km) limit and even though Mitsuki tries her best to keep the enemy away, Kazuki lets the enemy get close enough to cross the limit and cause an evacuation (breaking up the marriage interview, to Yayoi's delight). The rampage causes Miss Ra to fall off a building and Kazuki catches the enemy, saving her life.
Act. 07	"Hard Case"; Transliteration: "Hādo Kēsu" (Japanese: ハードケース)	May 20, 1999	May 2, 2003
The EDF and UN officers are impressed at how well Kazuki, Mitsuki and D work as a team. In battle, the Rara army uses the powerful Original robot against the UN Forces. The Rara robot concentrates on attacking Hartzenen, under orders from Rara to capture the pilot. Kazuki is in danger of being killed so Ken sends the surrender signal to Rara. The Rara robot lands, but inside Rara territory, taking Kazuki with it. Behind enemy lines, the robot continues to attack Hartzenen and a terrified Kazuki loses control, inflicting heavy damage on the superior Rara robot. Ken calls General Rara and begs him to release the pilot, but Rara refuses. Mitsuki wants to go save Kazuki but Ken orders her not to. An explosion rocks the landscape, and Kazuki's friends fear the worst.
Act. 08	"Mitsuki" (Japanese: MITSUKI)	May 27, 1999	May 2, 2003
When searching for Kazuki, all that is found by Mitsuki and the others of the UN forces is his damaged core robot. Kazuki, who although severely injured was able to limp away from the wreckage, his pilot suit destroyed, wakes up deep behind enemy lines, thought to be an innocent bystander. Miss Ra herself takes responsibility for his recovery. He witnesses Miss Ra change from the harsh trash talker she usually appears to be into a nice young girl who happens to look just like Mitsuki. Revealed to be Mitsuki Rara, the young girl seems interested in Kazuki. Even though he finds this Mitsuki interesting, Kazuki decides that he must get back to EDF territory and hopefully escape without having to deal with Mitsuki's mother Ayuko, who is even more evil than her husband. Ayuko slowly puts the pieces together and finds out Kazuki's true allegiance, along with footage of him exiting Hartzenen. Mitsuki learns that Kazuki is a EDF Core Robot pilot, but helps him to escape.
Act. 09	"Escape"; Transliteration: "Esukēpu" (Japanese: エスケープ)	June 3, 1999	May 6, 2003
After escaping back to Earth Defense Force territory, Kazuki tries to get things back to normal but keeps thinking of Mitsuki Rara. Ayuko discovers that Rara's secret weapon, a powerful robot named HIMC, is rejecting Miss Ra because of her feelings for Kazuki, and has her brainwashed to attack without feeling. The Rara Army directly attacks the Earth Defense Force's headquarters with copies of the Original robot and HIMC, easily penetrating their defenses and sending them to the brink of defeat. Kazuki pleads with Miss Ra to remember him, but to no avail. HIMC obliterates Hartzenen, and in a catatonic state Kazuki summons the robot Zinv from its resting place deep inside the EDF headquarters. Kazuki and Zinv destroy the invaders and rescue Miss Ra from HIMC, which escapes on its own.
Act. 10	"Repatriate"; Transliteration: "Ripatoriēto" (Japanese: リパトリエート)	June 10, 1999	May 6, 2003
Mitsuki Rara moves into the house with Kazuki, Yayoi, D and Mitsuki Sanada. The Rara forces are losing one battle after another especially when they are going up against Zinv, Kazuki's new robot. Rara demands the return of his daughter, and UN officers seize her to fulfill his wishes, derailing a date that Kazuki set up with her. The Earth Defense Force defies them and allows her to stay. Meanwhile, Ayuko wages an all out attack with a new weapon. With a blinding flash, Zinv and Mitsuki Sanada's robots vanish.
Act. 11	"Real"; Transliteration: "Riaru" (Japanese: リアル)	June 17, 1999	May 7, 2003
Kazuki awakens back in his own world. He's worried about his friends but tries to get used to being back home. The Rara and Ken of this universe have joined forces to study the parallel world. The barriers between the worlds have begun to break down, and robots begin to appear in the city, causing massive destruction. Kazuki and Mitsuki choose to go back to end the war and seal the rift. When Kazkuki arrives, he learns that Mitsuki had once again arrived in the parallel world before him and was captured by Rara.
Act. 12	"Ardent Desire"; Transliteration: "Ādento Dezaia" (Japanese: アーデント·デザイア)	June 24, 1999	May 7, 2003
The war is not going well for Kazuki and his friends. The Earth Defense Force has been disavowed by the United Nations and left on the run in an artifact vessel. In her jealousy at seeing Kazuki rescuing Mitsuki Rara (the new pilot of Hartzenen) instead of her, Mitsuki Sanada is tricked into piloting the complete version of HIMC. Ken discovers the parallel worlds are rapidly destabilizing, and destruction of both worlds is imminent.
Act. 13	"The World"; Transliteration: "Za Wārudo" (Japanese: ザ·ワールド)	July 1, 1999	May 8, 2003
Though Mitsuki Sanada tries to stop it, Complete HIMC easily defeats Zinv, leaving Kazuki trapped inside. D sacrifices herself for her love of Kazuki, crashing the empty artifact ship into Rara headquarters and destroying her bioroid body. Her soul returns to her real body, and she unlocks the limiter on Zinv, allowing Zinv's Light Hawk Wings to manifest. Zinv removes Mitsuki Sanada from HIMC and creates a black hole that crushes HIMC and the Rara base. Kazuki must destroy Zinv to save the two worlds and seal the rift. But when the dust clears, the world has changed. A third parallel world has formed where everyone gets to stay together, Kazuki and Mitsuki Sanada's wish come true.

=== OVA ===
No.	Title	Original release date
Act. 14	"Final Frontier"; Transliteration: "Fainaru Furontia" (Japanese: ファイナル·フロンティア)	December 22, 1999
Everyone has survived the combination, but with some new back stories to guide them. Ayuko has plans to revive the Rara army and intends on tricking/forcing Kazuki and Mitsuki (Rara) to hook up with a view to marriage. Meanwhile, artifacts have been discovered on the new earth. In the end, plans are made to explore space by sending Kazuki into space as Earth's representative – along with the two Mitsuki's, Yayoi and D as his personal back-up crew – as a resurrected Zinv awakens to return to Kazuki.

== Music ==
Opening Theme:

- "DUAL!": Act. 02 – 13
  Song by: HARU&SAYAKA from UNIVERS★L D
  Lyrics by: Hiroko Yah
  Composition and arrangement by: Seikou Nagaoka

Ending Theme:

- "Real": Act. 01 – 12
  Song by: Shifo from UNIVERS★L D
  Lyrics and composition by: Shifo
  Arrangement by: Seikou Nagaoka
  Original lyrics by: Yūsuke Kuroda
- "DUAL! (Mitsuki duet version)": Act. 14
  Song by: Mitsuki Sanada (CV: Rie Tanaka) & Mitsuki Rara (CV: Megumi Toyoguchi)
  Lyrics and composition by: Shifo
  Arrangement by: Seikou Nagaoka

== Glossary ==
Core Robots
Three multicolored bipedal machines reverse engineered from Zinv. Because they are man-made, the Core Robots are inferior to the originals in every way.

The Core Robots are used by the Earth Defense Force; Yayoi Schwael (replaced by Kazuki Yotsuga, and later by Mitsuki Rara) pilots the white Unit 1 (nicknamed "Hartzenen/Halcynen" by Kazuki), Mitsuki Sanada controls the red Unit 2, and D (briefly replaced by Alice, Mena, and Ryla) pilots the blue Unit 3.

Earth Defense Force
A United Nations-sponsored military organization under the command of Ken Sanada dedicated to foiling the Rara Army's plans for world domination. The EDF employs many soldiers, but relies solely upon the three Core Robots in battle.

Combat between the two armies is quite different from normal warfare; Rara informs the public where and when an attack will take place, and the combat zone is evacuated. At any time, either side can submit a "callsign", indicating their surrender. Because of these measures, there have been no casualties in the war.

HIMC (pronounced Himiko)
Zinv's opposite, HIMC carved a swath of ruin across D's world before she escaped. It seems as though only people with negative emotions in their hearts can control HIMC, as evidenced by its initial rejection of Mitsuki Rara, and its violent reaction to Mitsuki Sanada's jealousy. HIMC has some connection to the alien lifeform Kumu.

HIMC is completely and totally destroyed at the hands of Zinv, compressed down to nothing to prevent it from regenerating.

Kumu
The alien that advises Ayuko Rara. It has some relationship to D, and hates men with a passion. Kumu resembles a floating, glowing bell and garland.

When Zinv is destroyed and the worlds merge, Kumu is the name of a puppy that is given to the Sanada family by Ayuko Rara in the hopes of finding out information about Zinv. The name fits: while it loves the girls in the house, Kazuki gets a severe bite whenever he comes near.

Life Sympathy
A term for the power of a pilot's will to exert control over robots. High Life Sympathy levels can enable a robot to move faster and inflict more damage with melee attacks. For reasons revealed at the end of the series, the robots on Earth only respond to female Life Sympathy, though Kazuki is somehow exempt.

Because of his overwhelming negative Life Sympathy, Kazuki's robot is capable of feats beyond most other models.

Rara Army
Formed by Hiroshi Rara, it intends to unite the world under its banner. Like the EDF, it uses robots in battle rather than conventional weapons, but its machines are exotic and beastly, differing from its rival's humanoid robots. Rara's robots are also remotely operated, unlike the Earth Defense Force's cockpit-equipped models.

Rara prefers to operate outlandishly, broadcasting attack trailers and boasting of his army's God-given power (often through his mascot, Miss Ra). However, despite General Rara's highly visible status within the organization, another person wields the real authority.

The Original
A mech under the control of the Rara army, it has the power to control the atmosphere as well as some electromagnetic capabilities. It captures Kazuki along with Hartzenen and brings them to Rara's base where it falls off a large cliff, supposedly destroying it beyond repair.

The Original and Zinv are the only mechs confirmed to be found in The Artifact.

Zinv (pronounced Jinbu)
An incredibly powerful robot found with D. It sat dormant in the EDF's headquarters for years until Kazuki awakened it during Rara's assault.

Zinv has many unique abilities revolving around the manipulation of gravimetric forces, including gravitational projectiles, super speed, and crushing enemy mecha. Zinv also comes equipped with a nano-repair system that can fix any damage inflicted. Zinv only responds to Kazuki's Life Sympathy, and sometimes activates itself when Kazuki is not aboard.

Zinv defeats the lesser version of HIMC quite easily, but HIMC's final form takes the upper hand. When D removes the limiter preventing males from piloting it (Kazuki skirts this by being Zinv), Zinv instantly repairs itself and generates Light Hawk Wings. With this newfound power, Kazuki decimates HIMC and creates a black hole, reducing the Rara fortress to nothing.

With the two worlds dangerously close to oblivion, Zinv and Kazuki agree to destroy Zinv, ensuring that both worlds will live on. However, Zinv survives the explosion that consumes it, regenerating at the bottom of the ocean and returning to Kazuki in the third universe.

Followers of Tenchi Muyo! will recognize the Light Hawk Wings, as well as the Zinv look-alike in the anime Tenchi Muyo! GXP. The Tenchi Muyo! GXP novels confirmed that they are in fact the very same robot, and not alternate universe versions of each other as previously thought.

== Connections to Tenchi Muyo! Universe ==
It has been confirmed by the creator of Tenchi Muyo! and Dual! that the two series are related, and in fact occur in the same universe. A mecha, confirmed in the Tenchi Muyo! GXP novels to be Zinv, is found during an episode of Tenchi Muyo! GXP which runs parallel with the Tenchi OVA Series. The hero of the GXP series, Seina Yamada has been confirmed to be a direct reincarnation of Kazuki Yotsuga and, in a complicated way, several others are basically partial reincarnations of the rest of the cast. In fact, Dual! is so consistently relevant to the GXP novels they can be viewed as a distant sequel.

- The Great Prehistoric Civilization mentioned in the True Tenchi Muyo! novels is revealed, in the Tenchi Muyo! GXP novels, to be the space-faring civilization begun by the characters at the end of Dual!. It seems to have died out close to a billion years prior to the main Tenchi Muyo timeline. Though not the first or last, this civilization eventually performed the greatest "seeding" program in the galaxy. They seeded proto-planets so that the human genome would replicate itself and somehow even seeded cultural and technological norms so things like handheld telephone designs would repeat throughout the galaxy and similar food dishes, like curry and spaghetti, would continue almost unchanged throughout history. Tenchi's Earth has somehow turned out functionally identical to the earlier Earth. In fact, when the original solar system of the Earth from Dual is found, the entire solar system is found to be basically the same: containing a giant gas planet like Jupiter, a ringed planet like Saturn, etc.
- Washu explains that at one time in the past, a group of people (Kazuki's group) made such an impact on the universe that their existence had massive effects on the "Astral Sea" (the dimension where a being's "astral self" originates and returns after death) that their astrals basically replicated and continue to revive and form the base of many beings in the universe.
- Certain astrals are so similar to their past astral selves that they retain vestigial memories of their past life that come to them occasionally like déjà vu. Miki Steinbeck, apparently represents the closest thing to direct reincarnation to Mitsuki Sanada, and her father, Hiroshi Manada (or creator-she was an AI that developed an astral), is physically identical to Ken Sanada (but shares some personality features of Hiroshi Rara as well), a friend and rival of Hiroshi's (named Ken Raraiba Steinbeck) also seems to be the other half of this mixed up duo.
- By the end of GXP's 14th novel, Miki, another digital AI named Kirche, and D (a direct astral copy of the original D, containing all her memories- but, for unknown reasons, acts like D before she became "Dee") gain pseudo-cabbit bodies that were cloned from Fuku. With Fuku they seem to represent the most direct reincarnations of the original four girls in Dual. When the cabbit group appears in the 5th season of Tenchi Muyo! each had the same voice actors that voiced their respective counterparts from Dual.
- The Zinv that appears in GXP is the very same as the one in Dual and he immediately recognizes Seina as his partner.
- Seina represents an almost direct reincarnation of Kazuki and no others seem to share Kazuki's base astral.
- Other than Miki, Mitsuki Sanada's astral also forms the core of Kiriko Masaki, the Renza agent Karen, Tsukiko Masaki (Kiriko's mother and also the model for the AI that Hiroshi created and became Miki), and others.
- Other than Fuku, Yayoi Schwael shares her astral pattern with Amane Kaunaq, the Renza agent Gyokuren, Mikami Kuramitsu, and others.
- Other than Kirche, Mitsuki Rara shares her astral pattern with Ryoko Balta, the Renza agent Suiren, Ringo Tasuki, and others.
- Other than the D that is her astral copy, D/Dee shares her astral pattern with Neju Na Melmas, the Renza agent Hakuren, and others.
- When four of the girls that share an astral with their Dual counterpoint join Seina, his bad luck (described as a "biased probability" in the novels) is lessened and can even create good luck.
- Others that surround Seina, like Airi Masaki and Seto Kamiki Jurai probably represent other primary characters in Dual, such as Akane Yamano, Reika Nanjoin, and Ayuko Rara, but this has not been confirmed. Seto does have a separate "mirror self" called Kuis Panta that has been confirmed to share the D astral, but while they are practically copies of each other- they do not seem to share the same astral pattern.

=== Cameo appearances ===
- Sasami and several other Tenchi Muyo! characters were featured in inserts found in the Dual! Parallel Trouble Adventure releases in Japan.
- Kiyone Makibi, Ramia, and Misao Amano appear in a brief easter egg cameo in the series' OVA special ("Final Frontier", also known as episode 14).

== Production ==
Dual! was inspired by the popularity of Neon Genesis Evangelion when it aired in Japan in the 1990s with the main characters inspired by the dynamics of Shinji, Asuka, Rei and Misato.

=== Media ===
Dual! was released in Japan via VHS, Laserdisc and DVD from June 25 to December 22, 1999. A Blu-Ray version was released in Japan on October 11, 2018.

The US/Canada version was formerly licensed by Pioneer (Geneon). On October 17, 2023, Discotek announced a Blu-Ray release of the anime in 2024.
