= Happy World! =

Japanese manga series

ハッピーワールド (Happī Wārudo)
- Manga
- Written by: Kenjirō Takeshita
- Published by: Shueisha
- Magazine: Ultra Jump
- Original run: 2000 – 2006
- Volumes: 11
- Original video animation
- Directed by: Takashi Ikehata
- Studio: Zexcs
- Released: December 13, 2002 – June 27, 2003
- Runtime: 27 minutes
- Episodes: 3

Happy World! (ハッピーワールド, Happī Wārudo) is a Japanese manga series written and illustrated by Kenjirō Takeshita. It was serialized in Shueisha's Ultra Jump. The manga was adapted into an original video animation by KSS with animation work done by Zexcs.

== Plot ==
Takeshi Ōmura is an average middle schooler cursed with the bad fortune, as his everyday life is a misery; his house burns down, he sets his hand in dung, he gets chased by a wild dog and all sorts of activities that ruin his life. One day, he is visited by an angel with the name of Elle, and she claims that she came down from the heavens to aid Takeshi in his misfortune. To get rid of his bad luck, he places his bad luck in a small ball with the help of Elle and throws it out of sight. As Elle leaves and Takeshi continues his daily life, he finds the ball again and decides to wait for a person to pick it up. Unfortunately, a young girl sees the ball and moves into a path of a moving truck. Takeshi, realizing that he wouldn't be happy if he didn't save the girl, touches the ball and shouts that he would be the successor of the bad luck if saved by Elle. The angel transports them to a backyard of a house and becomes a human (experiencing gravity and a tangible body). From then on, Elle lives at the Ōmura household (and adopting the name to her own), and attends Takeshi's school.

== Characters ==
=== Main ===
- Takeshi Ōmura (大村 猛, Ōmura Takeshi) is the male protagonist of the series. He has suffered bad luck all his life and was treated with indifference by his father and all his family except his aunt and cousin. His luck gets even worse when his father chooses him to be his successor. It is Takeshii's destiny to have nothing but bad luck. He is protected by Elle but has to be near her constantly or else everything he does goes wrong, Due to his house being burnt, Takeshi lives with his aunt, Sanae, and cousin, Motoko, who constantly ridicules him. His aunt although kind constantly wants to dress him as a girl Voiced by: Masashi Yabe
- Elle Ōmura (大村 エル, Ōmura Eru) is an angel who is very naïve and direct in her thoughts. She became Takeshi's stepsister after changing into a human. Her memory was erased when she was young after the death of her mother, Ruelle and the sealing of her sister, Isra to prevent her from turning into a demon like her sister Isra.Voiced by: Satomi Hanamura
- Yuria Kusakabe (日下部 ゆりあ, Kusakabe Yuria) has constantly poor health since her birth. Due to her illness, she walks very slowly and is often late for class. She always carries around a stuffed animal, which contains her medicines. From the end of the 4th volume, she's dating Maruyama. Voiced by: Satomi Kōrogi

=== Others ===
- Sanae Ōmura (大村 早苗, Ōmura Sanae) is Takeshi's aunt and Motoko's mother. After Takeshi's house burnt down, she became Takeshi's guardian. After Elle's appearance as Takeshi's stepsister, she becomes Elle's guardian as well. She is a shy woman with a complex about her age and is often seen wearing white. In the manga, she works in an antique shop. She is mysteriously strong and skilled at fighting.

She enjoys making clothes and often tries to get Takeshi to wear dress's she apparently doesn't understand why this is a problem for him. Voiced by: Ai Uchikawa

- Motoko Eguchi (江口 素子, Eguchi Motoko) is Takeshi's tomboy cousin. She often ridicules Takeshi with erotica journals. She appears to also be attracted to him though not seriously. All of this does not mean she doesn't like him it's just her personality Voiced by: Kahoru Sasajima
- Sisio Maruyama (丸山 獅子, Maruyama Shishi) is Takeshi's classmate and friend. He is the smartest in the class and is rather cocky about it. He is usually seen roller skating around school corridors. He always sits behind Takeshi in class. After Elle's appearance, he tried to molest her but later turns his attention to Motoko. Voiced by: Thakur Nagakuni
- Takashi Omura is Takeshi's father and Sanae's older brother in the manga. He was the "god child" before Takeshi. He left his son alone at home when he was only 5 years old. His life became better when he met Ruelle. He is the savior of the country called Parmekia in the manga and won a Nobel Prize for world peace.
- Ruelle is an angel that was assigned to take care of Takashi in the manga. She is also the mother of Takeshi. She left her daughters Elle and Isra in heaven to take care of Takashi. She lost her angel power when she give birth to her son Takeshi. She was killed by one of the guerrillas in Parmekia.
- Isra is the eldest daughter of Ruelle in the manga. She is originally an angel but became a demon when she learned that her mother had lost her powers and died while in Parmekia. Her memory was sealed using the "Sealing Crown" and sent to deep sleep in the sea.
- Archangel Millael is a First Class, Level 1 angel in the manga. She is the person who is the most powerful angel in heaven. She was originally being task to take care of Takashi but instead the task went Ruelle due to taking care of a "god child" in Tibet. She was killed by Isra in full demon form. Her animal form is a white eagle.
- Prayer Omura is the daughter of Elle and Takeshi in the manga. However, she is not a result of an incest, as she hatched from an angel's egg as a result of an Immaculate Conception. Just she was adopted by Takeshi.
- Hikaru Hoshino is the childhood friend of Takeshi. When she was young, she was always depressed until she met Takeshi who taught her kendo. This made her to become the kendo champion in Japan. Her deadly attack is called "Triple Death Strike". Like Takeshi, she is half-demon whereas her mother is a demon.
- Michiru Hoshino is Hikaru's younger sister. She is a sadist and she enjoys herself by inflicting pain on other. She likes to see her sister suffer from using her new invention. She can turn her drawings into real life by using her demon-like power.

== Media ==
=== Manga ===
Happy World! is written and illustrated by Kenjirō Takeshita. It was serialized in Shueisha's Ultra Jump, ending the serialization at 72 chapters. Shueisha published the manga's 11 bound volumes between February 24, 2001, and July 19, 2006.

==== Volume listing ====
No.	Release date	ISBN
1	February 24, 2001	978-4-088-76128-2
1. The Angel Has Come to My Hopeless Self; 2. Be a Good Girl; 3. Family Game; 4. Train, Train; 5. Ring; 6. School Heaven; 7. Runner; 8. Every Little Thing, Every Precious Thing
2	October 24, 2001	978-4-088-76222-7
9. Looking at Flowers; 10. Boobies; 11. Super Fast Spinner!; 12. The Shadows of Youth; 13. A Useless Guy; 14. Fighting Club; 15. To Win or to Lose
3	May 17, 2002	978-4-088-76305-7
16. To Become a Manga Artist; 17. Angel's Egg; 18. Bubbles; 19. Good Morning Baby!; 20. Your Song is My Song; 21. Invincible!; 22. Hell
4	November 19, 2002	978-4-088-76373-6
23. Drifting Classroom; 24. Demonic Gluttony; 25. Demonic Kiss; 26. Demonic Creature; 27. A Little Love Melody; 28. My Summer Vacation; 29. The One and Only Idol
5	August 19, 2003	978-4-0887-6482-5
30. Glass Boy; 31. One-Night Gigolo; 32. Bitterness; 33. Hero - it's the time to become a hero; 34. Exciting Zoo; 35. There Friday: Decisive Battle
6	February 19, 2004	978-4-088-76575-4
36. A Festival by 10 People; 37. Fighting Without Humanity and Justice; 38. An Area of Shadows; 39. Cruel Angel's Thesis; 40. After the Festival; 41. Play Banned
7	June 18, 2004	978-4-088-76632-4
42. Dream Within a Dream; 43. The School Block's Cafe; 44. Being a Guy is Tough; 45. I Want a Kiss; 46. Wounded Angel; 47. She's Not an Angel: Tohma Sariel!!!
8	February 18, 2005	978-4-088-76733-8
48. We're Angels!; 49. Christmas Love; 50. Kill Me With Eros; 51. The Distance of the Stars; 52. Shooting Stars; 53. Below the Many Stars; 54. Orihime and Hikoboshi
9	October 18, 2005	978-4-088-76845-8
55. Let's Search for Fragments of Stars; 56. Words as a Gift; 57. Dad Returns; 58. The Storm-Bringing Man; 59. God Help Me!; 60. The Twilight of the Gods
10	March 17, 2006	978-4-088-77060-4
61. Wings, Please!; 62. Let's Talk About Old Times; 63. To the Small Ones; 64. Mother at the Quay; 65. Full Metal Jacket; 66. Hell Change
11	July 19, 2006	978-4-088-77121-2
67. You Can't Put it into Words; 68. The Men's Journey; 69. At the End of the World; 70. Even if the World Falls from the Sky...; 71. Happy World!; 72. A Happy End

=== Original video animation ===
Directed by Takashi Ikehata, a 3-episode original video animation was created by KSS for Happy World!. The OVA uses two pieces of theme music. "Kami-sama no Okuri mono ~Naked Angel~" (神様の贈り物〜Naked Angel〜) by Millio is the opening theme, while "Shiawase Biyori" (幸せ日和) by Satomi Hanamura is the ending theme. On August 9, 2002, an animation CD was released for Happy World!, containing both opening and ending themes. The first episode was released on a DVD by Happinet Pictures on December 13, 2002 and on VHS on December 20, 2002. The second episode was released on DVD on March 28, 2003. The third episode was released on DVD on June 27, 2003.

==== Episode listing ====
No.	Title	Original release date
1	"I Was Helpless, and Then An Angel Came"; Transliteration: "Dōshiyō Mona Boku ni Tenshi Gaori te Kita" (Japanese: どうしようもない僕に天使が降りてきた)	December 13, 2002
2	"Chase the Chance"	March 28, 2003
3	"Over the Rainbow"	June 27, 2003
