= Ai Uchikawa =

Japanese voice actress

Ai Uchikawa (内川 藍維, Uchikawa Ai; born Yuka Uchikawa (内川 優香, Uchikawa Yūka), February 27, 1972 in Saitama Prefecture) is a Japanese voice actress. Uchikawa is currently affiliated with Sigma Seven.

== Filmography ==
=== Television Animation ===
- Chouja Reideen (1996), Kirari Saijyou
- Brave Command Dagwon (1996), Volleyball Staff
- Mystery of Nonomura Hospital (1996 OVA), Chisato Mamiya
- Manmaru the Ninja Penguin (1997), Mamiko
- Cowboy Bebop (1998), Announcer, Murial (Ep. 7), Flight Announcer
- St. Luminous Mission High School (1998 TV series), Koushinzuka Yukine
- Crest of the Stars (1999 TV series), Grieda
- Dual! Parallel Trouble Adventure (1999), D, Mena Fitzgerald
- Kakyuusei (1999 TV series), Mahoko Mochida, cat (ep 1)
- Dual! Parallel Trouble Adventures (1999 OVA), D Sanada, Mena Fitzgerald
- Hamtaro (2000), Kana Iwata, Kapuru-kun
- Dennou Boukenki Webdiver (2001 TV series), Angel, Mika Arisugawa
- Gravion (2002 TV series), Tesera
- D.C. ~Da Capo~ (2003), Jungle Ranger No. 3, Linda
- Gravion Zwei (2004), Tesera
- Phoenix: Sun (2004), Marimo
- Madlax (2004), Elanore Baker
- Angel Blade Punish! (2004 OVA), Moena Shinguji / Angel Blade
- Pumpkin Scissors (2006), Hannah (ep 9)
- D.Gray-man (2007), Sarah (ep 29)
- El Cazador de la Bruja (2007), Margarita (ep 10)
- Mameushi-kun (2007), Mameushi
- Mix Mix Chocolate drama CD (2003), Committee Executive

=== OVA ===
- My Sexual Harassment (1996), John
- Elf ban Kakyuusei (1997), Mahoko Mochida
- Yu-No (1998), Ayumi Arima
- Blue Submarine No. 6 (1998), Mutio's Friend
- Refrain Blue (2000), Hayase Shizuku
- MazinKaiser (2001), Sayaka Yumi
- Happy World! (2002), Sanae Ohmura
- Step Up Love Story (2002), Kaoru (ep 3)
- Mazinkaiser: Shitou! Ankoku Daishogun (2003), Sayaka Yumi
- Hininden Gausu (2005), Kurama-HIME
- Banner of the Stars III (2005), Grieda (ep 1)

=== Theatrical animation ===
- Tottoko Hamutaro: Hamu Hamu Land Daibouken (2001), Kana-chan
- Tottoko Hamutaro: Ham Ham Ham~Jya! Maboroshi no Princess (2002), Kapuru-kun
- Tottoko Hamutaro: Ham Ham Paradi-chu! Hamutaro to Fushigi no Oni no Ehonto (2004), Kapuru-kun

=== Dubbing ===
- Ginger Snaps, Brigitte Fitzgerald (Emily Perkins)
- Music and Lyrics, Cora Corman (Haley Bennett)
- Suspiria (1998 DVD edition), Suzy Bannion (Jessica Harper)
