= Stray Little Devil =

Japanese manga series

ストレイ リトル デビル (Sutorei Ritoru Debiru)
- Genre: Comedy, Fantasy, Yuri
- Manga
- Written by: Kotaro Mori
- Published by: MediaWorks
- English publisher: DrMaster
- Magazine: Dengeki Comic Gao!
- Original run: June 2004 – March 2007
- Volumes: 5

Stray Little Devil (ストレイ リトル デビル, Sutorei Ritoru Debiru) is a Japanese manga series written and illustrated by Kotaro Mori. The manga was originally serialized in Dengeki Comic Gao!, and was later published into five bound volumes by MediaWorks from January 2005 to March 2007. DrMaster Publications Inc. licensed the manga series for English-language publication in North America and released the five volumes between June 2006 and November 2007. The story is a comedic fantasy, detailing the life of a girl named Pam Akumachi, who is unintentionally drawn into the "Spirit World". Her only hope of returning home is a mysterious individual named Remy, who promises to tell Pam the way back if she becomes a full-fledged devil by passing through the devil's educational system.

== Plot ==
Stray Little Devil begins when a young Pam "Akuma Akumachi", entranced by a story her grandmother told about meeting a kind devil, tries to cast a spell in order to summon a similar entity. Much to the surprise of her classmates, Masao Kusaka and Rinka Amamiya, the spell works, and Pam finds herself unexpectedly transported to a mysterious realm, the Spirit World, due to the magical forces unleashed when her necklace is drawn through the portal opened in her classroom. This is a world where human existence is insignificant and invisible, overshadowed by supernatural forces such as Angels, Devils, and Spirits.

One of the first people Pam encounters in the spirit world is a duplicate of her classmate Rinka, however, this angel, named Linfa, quickly attacks her with a magical sword. Pam's rescue was completely unexpected and miraculous, for it was Remy who revealed her newfound identity as a devil, saving her from danger at the very last moment. Remi tells her that the only way she can go back to her home world is to take on the mantle of a devil, forsaking her humanity and accepting devilhood as a way of life.

After Remy leaves her, Pam is in a vulnerable state and is soon taken advantage of by Lizyerra, who provides Pam with a job as an intern at Pandemonium, the devils' HQ. Though she has not yet passed the spirits' entry exam to become a full-fledged devil, Lizyerra gives her the opportunity to stay as a stray devil. Because she has no familiar and is therefore unable to prove her credentials as a devil, she is initially classified as a probationary intern rather than being welcomed into the world of demons. Lizyerra brings Raim, Vine, and Pam together in a neutral area that serves as a bridge between the two separate worlds, devil land and angel land, providing them with an opportunity to collaborate in their pursuit of finding Pam's familiar. Eventually, Pam succeeds in claiming the powerful storm djinn En Zu and, with the confirmation of her internship, embarks on a devilish educational journey in order to learn how to navigate the Spirit World and survive in it.

=== Setting ===
The series has a rule book for its Spirit World:

1. The Spirit World is divided into three areas:
  - Angelea, the land of the Angels. Their headquarters, the Church, is located here.
  - Daemonea, the land of the Devils. Their headquarters, government offices and educational institute, the Pandemonium, are located here.
  - The Cooperative Development Sector separates the two realms of Angelea and Daemonea and is considered neutral territory that anyone may enter. It is forbidden for angels and devils to enter the other side's own realms without permission, however. The city of Uruk is located in the Cooperative Development Sector.
2. The entire Spirit World functions under the Law of Conservation of Luck; an angel's good luck is a devil's bad luck and vice versa. If a member of one race helps a member of the other, the one performing the aid will immediately receive bad luck in equal measure to the good luck of the receiver. It is as yet unknown what would happen if members of the two races strove to render equal service to one another. Since the two have engaged in at least one world war, it may be some time before such attempts would be made.
3. There are two possible sources for angels and demons.
  1. A spirit can choose to take an entry exam to become an angel or a devil at some point in its life. Alternatively, a spirit could decide to remain as it is indefinitely. It is also possible for a trainee to forsake demonic status, at least, and return to being a spirit.
  2. Pure-breds. Devils - and presumably angels - can reproduce sexually with members of their own kind. It is as yet unknown whether angels and devils could reproduce together, with spirits or humans, although there seems to be some evidence of the latter. Pure-bred devils apparently have access to powers that devils spawned through the entry exam cannot touch.
  3. Angels can 'fall', thereby becoming devils, if they are outcast from their people for acts of treason. Traditionally, the eyes of the fallen are branded with runes, leaving them blind. There is at least one case where an angel took a rune for a fallen lover, allowing them both to see with one eye, while the other was blinded.
4. Economy. The devils of Daemonea are organized by the "Guild", a tail-end organization of the Pandemonium which unifies revenues by unionizing all devil business in the autonomous areas, like the city of Uruk. The angelic counterpart is known as the Chapel. The main difference between the two, other than the races that run them, is that the Chapel performs services for free while the Guild takes money. The Chapel runs on donations, given in gratitude for service.
5. Morality. While angels in the Spirit World do apparently have a reputation for charity and kindness and devils have one for competitiveness, neither race seems to be purely good or purely evil. The Spirit World angels are capable of being overly aggressive, standoffish and can sometimes resort to in-fighting, while devils can be quite caring among each other and concerned about the welfare of others. Spirits seem to be unconstrained by preconceptions about their morality and may adopt any standpoint.
6. Flight. Most creatures in the Spirit World seem to be capable of flight. Demonic flight - and probably the other forms - is not actually dependent on possessing wings and the wind, but rather on an ability to sense and navigate the flow of "ether", a very different kind of current. Wind and ether may at times flow against each other. Pam has managed to fly using ether without going against the wind, which is considered a credible feat, even an innovation. Alas, this style of flight can apparently cause dizziness and nausea because of the many strange maneuvers one has to perform to manage it.
7. Religion. Although the sign of the cross is frequently shown in Stray Little Devil and the use of angels and devils seems to refer to the Christian religion, it is revealed in Volume 4 that the Spirit World adheres to the Sumerian religion, when a religious festival takes place and the creation myths are read to a crowd. Various characters' names and the names of assorted objects also refer to the Sumerian mythology (see hyperlinks).

=== Characters ===
Pam Akumachi (阿久町 ぱむ, Akumachi Pamu)
The main character of the story. Pam is a kindhearted, somewhat clumsy girl who is not that good at learning, but prides herself on her homework and cooking. She is very affectionate physically, prone to tackle-hugging people who show her kindness. Pam is trying her best to become a full-fledged devil with the sole goal of returning to the human world. She has considerable trouble with adapting to the Spirit World and the Pandemonium at first, and seems to be becoming quite fond of the fierce angel Linfa. Since arriving in the Spirit World, Pam has contracted the ferocious storm genie En Zu as her familiar, an arrangement not devoid of conflict. En Zu has informed her that her heirloom pendant, which has demonstrated unusual powers, is a piece of Tupsumati, the Tablets of Fate.
Linfa (リンファ, Rinfa)
The "Successor of the Aureole," and the first recurring character of the series who Pam meets in the Spirit World. Linfa is an extremely powerful angel for her age and a personal favorite of Aregna, representative of the Angels' Council. Although she initially tried to kill Pam for trespassing into Angelea and has stated that devils are no better than the rampaging monsters she often kills for the Church, she may be slowly starting to warm up to her. This is probably because Pam has saved her several times, with no regard for herself or the danger posed to her by the Law of Conservation of Luck. Linfa looks and sounds exactly like Pam's human classmate Rinka. In the fourth volume, it is revealed that Linfa is half of the ancient Queen of the Angels, Ishtar.
Lizyerra (リズィエラ, Rizuiera)
The most prominent female instructor at the devil academy. She is very motherly and takes good care of her students, including Pam. She is known for her rather curvaceous and voluptuous figure, though she is rather rough in her manners. She enjoys drinking alcohol and apparently has some history with Aregna. Although she usually acts annoyed at his behaviour and calls him names, there have been more than a few hints that she harbors some romantic interest in him.
Raim (ライム, Raimu)
One of Pam's classmates and a fellow devil intern. She has a very rough and blunt personality and inexplicably speaks with a Kansai dialect. She is also an admirer of the devil's instructor, Lizyerra, which caused some friction between her and Pam at first, since she felt Lizyerra was showing favor to Pam over her. The two eventually become friends through some trial and hardship. Raim has revealed that she chose to become a devil in order to earn a lot of money for her home; with sufficient wealth, she could afford to have a town built which can withstand the constant storm winds of that region, to the local spirits' net benefit.
Vine (ウィーネ, Uiine)
Another one of Pam's classmates at the Pandemonium. Vine is a pure blooded devil and the granddaughter of the devil council's chairman. Her parents have died from unknown causes. Vine is extremely kindhearted, gentle and nice, to the point that she doubts she has what it takes to be a proper representative of her species, despite the fact that she has access to powers that devils born of the exams cannot access. One of her signature traits is "Hell's Heavenly Smile"; by smiling at people, Vine can typically persuade them to do even the most ridiculous things. As a pure blooded devil, she exhibits different physical features than her peers; most notably curved, goat-like horns, elongated feather-like ears, and a fluffy, furred tail in lieu of the hairless, spade-tipped tails possessed by most of the other devils.
En Zu (アン・ズー, An Zuu)
Pam's familiar. En Zu calls himself the storm genie and the king of darkness. His true form is an indu gud, a huge eagle with the head of a lion. During his first encounter with Pam, he had for some reason become a huge, malformed beast which was being hunted and fought by Linfa. Pam's heirloom necklace knocked En Zu out and shrunk him dramatically, allowing Pam to claim him as her familiar. En Zu does not relish the relationship, as he views Pam as a weakling and a fool, although he does look out for her as a familiar should. Alas, Pam has become convinced that En Zu, whom she addresses as "Zu-kun", is a pervert; in his combat form, which looks like a young male devil, Zu has managed to shock Pam's sensibilities without meaning to. Additionally, En Zu seems to have lost a lot of his memory from before the time when he was claimed as Pam's familiar, due to psychological trauma he suffered before Pam took him. Recent information indicates that En Zu is a usurper and that he had been imprisoned for a long time before being released by Remy and went on his ill-fated rampage.
Aregna (アレグナ, Areguna)
Chairman representative of the angels' council and Linfa's patron, Aregna is a tall, often stern-faced angel of great power, whose eyes usually seem to stay closed. He seems to have some personal history with the female devil Lizyerra and is, despite his haughty appearance and past military exploits, more open-minded about the other inhabitants of the Spirit World than many of his fellow angels. He tries to encourage Linfa to become friends with Pam and retains Lizyerra's 'private number', apparently retaining fond memories of old times they have shared together. It is revealed in volume 4 that Aregna's real name is "the ruler of the foundation" Ninurta, Girsu and a contemporary - and currently an opponent - of Remy. He sealed away the ancient Queen of the Angels, half of which resides in Linfa.
Remy (レミー, Remii)
A mysterious young man of great powers, who first reveals to Pam of her transformation into a devil and tells her what she has to do in order to return home. En Zu has declared that Remy does not smell like any angel, devil or spirit. It has been revealed that Remy and En Zu know each other. Rem also knew Pam's name when he first met her and apparently has plans for her involving the restoration of the shattered Tupsimati. He seems to care about Pam's well-being, but he avoids answering her questions. In volume 4, it is revealed that Remy is working to restore the Tupsimati and is going to enact an ancient ritual to renew the Spirit World, which is starting to die. The way he is going about this brings him into conflict with his contemporary, Aregna, and eventually led to Remy framing Aregna and later battling him in prison. It appears that Remy was the victor, killing his opponent.

== Manga ==
Stray Little Devil was originally serialized in Dengeki Comic Gao! The thirty-two chapters were collected into five volumes published by MediaWorks. The series was Kotaro Mori's first original work, and was at first envisioned as a short-term series which then became a longer-term series. The English version was released by DrMaster.

== Reception ==
The first volume of the manga was given mixed reviews, Hilary Goldstein from IGN gave first volume a Must Read rating. Goldstein goes on to write: "Whether artistically, thematically or plot-wise, you're not going to get what you're expected, and that's a very good thing in the growing manga market, where many titles tread the same ground." In a review at Anime News Network, Carlo Santos commented that "It could still use a lot of improvement in the story department, and it needs to stop resorting to clichés all the time, but what there is, is handled well". Alex Hoffman at Comics Village stated "An interesting premise and good character interaction make this fantasy manga worth reading, but production values hamper its ability to tell its story."
