= Infinite Ryvius =

Japanese anime television series

- 無限のリヴァイアス
- Created by: Hajime Yatate
- Developed by: Yōsuke Kuroda
- Directed by: Gorō Taniguchi
- Music by: Katsuhisa Hattori; M.I.D.
- Country of origin: Japan
- Original language: Japanese
- No. of episodes: 26

Production
- Producers: Fukashi Azuma (TV Tokyo); Kazunori Takashiro; Fumikuni Furusawa
- Production companies: TV Tokyo; Yomiko Advertising; Sunrise

Original release
- Network: TXN (TV Tokyo)
- Release: October 6, 1999 – March 29, 2000

Related
- Manga
- Written by: Yōsuke Kuroda
- Illustrated by: Shinsuke Kurihashi
- Published by: MediaWorks
- English publisher: ComicsOne (volume 1); DrMaster (volume 2)
- Magazine: Monthly Comic Dengeki Daioh
- Original run: December 18, 1999 – September 18, 2000
- Volumes: 2
- Original net animation

Infinite Ryvius: Illusion
- Studio: Sunrise
- Released: June 30, 2000
- Runtime: 5–7 minutes
- Episodes: 6

Infinite Ryvius (Japanese: 無限のリヴァイアス, Hepburn: Mugen no Rivaiasu) is a 26-episode science fiction drama Japanese anime television series produced by Sunrise.

The character and mecha designs in Ryvius were created by Hisashi Hirai, who later went on to design characters for Gundam SEED.

The series is noted for its music, which blends Western R&B/hip-hop with J-pop vocals, including its title song "dis–", performed by bilingual Japanese-American singer Mika Arisaka. Most of the songs were composed by M.I.D., while background instrumentals were created by Katsuhisa Hattori.

The anime was originally licensed by Bandai Entertainment in North America until it went out of print in 2012. Following the closure of Bandai Entertainment, Sunrise announced at Otakon 2013 that Sentai Filmworks had rescued Infinite Ryvius, along with a handful of other former BEI titles.

On August 1, 2026, Discotek Media announced at Otakon that they will release the series on Blu-ray in North America in 2026.

A two-volume manga adaptation was released concurrently with the series in 1999–2000, which was then published in English in 2004. A parody spin-off original net animation (ONA) series, Infinite Ryvius: Illusion, was released in 2000.

== Plot ==
In the year AD 2225, mankind has expanded from Earth to inhabit nearly all the planets and nearby moons in colonies and settlements. Space travel has advanced to the point of being commonplace; for the inhabitants of the Solar System, becoming an astronaut is a realistic career path. One of the schools established to train future space voyagers is the Liebe Delta, a space station positioned in Earth's orbit. This progress exists despite the Geduld, a mysterious sea of plasma that erupted from the sun along Earth's orbital plane in AD 2137. Stretching from the sun to the edge of the solar system, this phenomenon of high temperatures and gravity pressures remains unexplained.

Kouji Aiba, a sixteen-year-old boy, leaves his home on Earth to attend the Liebe Delta and train for his Level 2 piloting license, traveling alongside his childhood friend, Aoi Housen, who unexpectedly reveals her enrollment in the station's flight attendant program and informs him that his younger brother, Yuki, will also be joining the same flight class.

The students and teaching staff on the Liebe Delta lead normal lives, focused on their studies and daily routines. They even have a vacation period, called the Dive Break, during which the space station approaches the Geduld for system maintenance. Out of approximately 1,000 students, about 500 remain onboard during the break. Unknown to everyone, the space station is sabotaged by a gas attack during a routine dive, leaving most of the staff unconscious. The Liebe Delta begins free falling into the depths of the Geduld Sea, where the intense gravitational pressures threaten to crush the station and kill everyone aboard. The remaining instructors sacrifice their lives to save the students, but their efforts fail. Just as the station teeters on the edge of collapse, a hidden ship called the RYVIUS activates and surfaces from the Geduld Sea, rescuing the surviving students aboard the Liebe Delta.

Now stranded in space and abandoned by humanity's governments, the students aboard the RYVIUS must navigate their new reality. As anger, fear, and tension grow among the crew, Kouji struggles to maintain order and unity. He faces personal challenges (including clashes with his brother Yuki), his complicated feelings for the Uranian aristocrat Fina S. Shinozaki, the task of avoiding Aoi, and the mysterious appearance of a girl in pink wandering the halls. As the situation worsens, Kouji must determine whether he can guide the RYVIUS to safety or if he will lose everything he holds dear.

=== Main characters ===
- Kouji Aiba – The series' primary protagonist. A diplomatic and empathetic student who repeatedly attempts to maintain social order aboard the Ryvius, ultimately helping guide the castaways back toward cooperation and civilian norms.
- Yuki Aiba – Kouji's younger brother and one of the most skilled pilots aboard the Ryvius. His emotional isolation, rivalry with Kouji, and role as a Vital Guarder operator place him at the center of the ship's power struggles.
- Aoi Housen – A childhood friend of the Aiba brothers and a flight attendant trainee. She serves as an emotional anchor for the group and plays a key role in resolving interpersonal conflicts.
- Ikumi Oze – A charismatic and talented pilot who later becomes one of the Ryvius's captains. His traumatic past and growing paranoia lead him toward increasingly authoritarian rule.
- Airs Blue – Leader of Team Blue and an early captain of the Ryvius. He represents violent authoritarianism and introduces the controversial points system that deepens divisions among the crew.
- Juli Bahana – A senior student and de facto leader of the elite Zwei. After Team Blue's fall, she assumes command and represents a restrained, ethically motivated alternative to previous regimes.
- Stein Heigar – A calculating strategist among the Zwei whose pursuit of order evolves into a harsh technocratic rule, highlighting the dangers of control-driven governance.
- Neya – The biological core and guardian entity of the Ryvius. An enigmatic non-human being whose interventions are crucial to the survival of the ship and its crew.

== Episodes ==
The titles given by Bandai Entertainment sometimes differ from literal translations; the Bandai-given titles appear in parentheses.

List of episodes
No.	Title	Original release date
1	"A Time That Should Come"; Transliteration: "Kitarubeki Toki" (Japanese: きたるべきとき)	October 6, 1999
2	"Unnecessary Things"; Transliteration: "Yokei na Koto" (Japanese: よけいなこと)	October 13, 1999
3	"Crossing the Ocean (Beyond the Vast Sea)"; Transliteration: "Unabara o Koete" (Japanese: うなばらをこえて)	October 20, 1999
4	"Ring Of Ryvius"; Transliteration: "Rivaiasu no Wa" (Japanese: リヴァイアスのわ)	October 27, 1999
5	"A Small Settlement (A Little Harmony)"; Transliteration: "Chiisana Matomari" (Japanese: ちいさなまとまり)	November 3, 1999
6	"My Moment"; Transliteration: "Boku no Setsuna" (Japanese: ぼくのせつな)	November 10, 1999
7	"The Changing Times"; Transliteration: "Kawari-Yuku Toki" (Japanese: かわりゆくとき)	November 17, 1999
8	"We Didn't Know Anything"; Transliteration: "Nanimo Shiranakatta" (Japanese: なにもしらなかった)	November 24, 1999
9	"Vital Guarder"; Transliteration: "Vaitaru Gādā" (Japanese: ヴァイタル・ガーダー)	December 1, 1999
10	"Even if it's Unbelievable (Even If You Can't Believe)"; Transliteration: "Shinjirarenakutemo" (Japanese: しんじられなくても)	December 8, 1999
11	"After the Festival (When the Party's Over)"; Transliteration: "Matsuri no Ato" (Japanese: まつりのあと)	December 15, 1999
12	"Whereabouts of the Future"; Transliteration: "Mirai no Arika" (Japanese: みらいのありか)	December 22, 1999
13	"We Can Only Touch Each Other (If Only to Meet)"; Transliteration: "Fureau Koto Shika" (Japanese: ふれあうことしか)	December 29, 1999
14	"Overly Conscious (To Be Too Conscious)"; Transliteration: "Ishiki Shisugi" (Japanese: いしきしすぎ)	January 5, 2000
15	"As if We Were Set Adrift (Swept Away)"; Transliteration: "Nagasareru Mama ni" (Japanese: ながされるままに)	January 12, 2000
16	"Distorted World (Deforming World)"; Transliteration: "Yugamu Sekai" (Japanese: ゆがむせかい)	January 19, 2000
17	"Free Order"; Transliteration: "Jiyū no Chitsujo" (Japanese: じゆうのちつじょ)	January 26, 2000
18	"We Didn't Understand (Incomprehensible)"; Transliteration: "Wakariaenai" (Japanese: わかりあえない)	February 2, 2000
19	"Smiling With You"; Transliteration: "Egao de Kimi to" (Japanese: えがおできみと)	February 9, 2000
20	"Things You Can't Give Up"; Transliteration: "Yuzurenai Mono" (Japanese: ゆずれないもの)	February 16, 2000
21	"We Don't Need Tomorrow"; Transliteration: "Ashita Nanka Iranai" (Japanese: あしたなんかいらない)	February 23, 2000
22	"For the Sake of Surviving (In Order To Survive)"; Transliteration: "Ikinokoru Tame ni" (Japanese: いきのこるために)	March 1, 2000
23	"The Torn-Off Past"; Transliteration: "Chigireta Kako" (Japanese: ちぎれたかこ)	March 8, 2000
24	"Kōji Aiba"; Transliteration: "Aiba Kōji" (Japanese: あいばこうじ)	March 15, 2000
25	"For the Sake Of Being Myself (In Order To Be Me)"; Transliteration: "Ore de Aru Tame ni" (Japanese: おれであるために)	March 22, 2000
26	"Tomorrow"; Transliteration: "Ashita" (Japanese: あした)	March 29, 2000

== Manga ==
A companion manga was released in Japan in 1999–2000. Created by Shinsuke Kurihashi and published by MediaWorks Publishing, the manga details the voyage of the Ryvius from the character viewpoints of Aoi Housen, and to a lesser extent, her roommates Kozue Izumi and Reiko Ichikawa. This is in contrast to the anime, which is seen through the eyes of the Aiba brothers, Ikumi Oze, and other mostly male characters. As such, the manga does not follow the anime "to the letter" but provides episodes and plotlines previously unseen.

The English-language rights to the Ryvius manga were acquired by ComicsOne, and the first volume of the English version, covering anime episodes 1–13, was released in October 2004. The second and final volume, covering the remainder of the series, was expected to be released in January 2005. After ComicsOne was taken over by DrMaster, Volume 2 of the Infinite Ryvius manga was delayed. It was finally released under the new DrMaster label in May 2005.

== Soundtracks ==
=== Infinite Ryvius Original Soundtrack 1 ===
- VICL-60485
- Release Date: December 16, 1999
1. "Dis (Club Mix version)" by Mika Arisaka
2. "Nani mo Shiranakutemo" (なにもしらなくても; "Unaware of Anything")
3. "Boku no Setsuna" (ぼくのせつな; "My Moment")
4. "Revise Us"
5. "Nowhere"
6. "Mishiranu Mono" (みしらぬもの; "The Unknown")
7. "Kokoro no Sukima" (こころのすきま; "Void in the Heart")
8. "Kuzureyuku Mono" (くずれゆくもの; "What is Decaying")
9. "Easy Living"
10. "Kobore Ochite" (こぼれおちて; "Dropping Out")
11. "Yume o Sugitemo (Remix version)" (夢を過ぎても; "Even After Dreaming") by Mika Arisaka
12. "Communication"
13. "Almost Blue"
14. "Ikinobiru Kanata" (いきのびるかなた; "Beyond Survival")
15. "Faint Hope"
16. "Maemuki ni" (まえむきに; "In A Positive Mood")
17. "Cool!"
18. "Dis (English version)" by Mika Arisaka
19. "Yume o Sugitemo" (夢を過ぎても; "Even After Dreaming") by Mika Arisaka
20. "Dis" (Instrumental)
21. "Yume o Sugitemo" (夢を過ぎても; "Even After Dreaming") (Instrumental)

=== Infinite Ryvius Original Soundtrack 2 ===
Infinite RYVIUS Original Soundtrack 2

- VICL-60486
- Release Date: 1 March 2000
1. "Harakunaru Sasayaki" (はるかなるささやき; "Distancing Whisper")
2. "Nani mo Shiranakutemo" (なにもしらなくても; "Unaware of Anything")
3. "Toge" (棘(トゲ); "Thorn"); performed by Mika Arisaka
4. "Mukai Aumono" (むかいあうもの; "Face To Face")
5. "Genjitsuto no Haza made" (げんじつとのはざまで; "Until Reality Shows Its Face")
6. "Kokoro no Kakera" (こころのかけら; "Fragments of the Heart")
7. "Itoshi sa no Nakade" (いとしさのなかで; "Into Beauty")
8. "Hayaru Kokoro" (はやるこころ; "Thriving Heart")
9. "Utsutsu Narumono" (うつつなるもの; "Taking Revenge")
10. "Tawamurete" (たわむれて; "Flirting")
11. "Mitsumete" (みつめて; "Watching")
12. "Shinjirarerumono wa" (しんじられるものは; "Of Disbelief")
13. "Yume o Sugitemo" (ゆめをすぎても; "Even After Dreaming")
14. "Mirai e no Ippo" (みらいへのいっぽ; "A Step Towards the Future")
15. "Aragaenumama" (あらがえぬまま)
16. "Sasurai Tsuzukete" (さすらいつづけて; "Continued Wandering")
17. "Tsumugareta Fuan" (つむがれたふあん; "Spun Anxiety")
18. "Ketsui to Koudou to" (けついとこうどうと; "Decision and Action")
19. "Todoketai Kokoro" (とどけたいこころ; "Undeliverable Heart")
20. "Shinkirou no You ni" (しんきろうのように, "Like A Mirage")
21. "Ashita ga Arukara" (あしたがあるから; "Because There Will Be Tomorrow")
22. "Yamikara no Hohoemi" (やみからのほほえみ; "Smile From The Shadows")
23. "Shiritakattakoto" (しりたかったこと; "Things I Wanted to Know")
24. "Yume o Sugimoto" (夢を過ぎても; "Even After Dreaming"); performed by Mika Arisaka
25. "Todoketai Kokoro" (とどけたいこころ; "Undeliverable Heart"); Reggae Phil Mix
26. H (Mega Mix)

=== Infinite Ryvius Original Soundtrack 3 ===
- VICL-60487
- Release Date: 23 March 2000
1. M.I.D. ANTHEM
2. DIS~ (Song Bird Mix; performed by Mika Arisaka)
3. BLUE WRECKAGE (performed by Noriko)
4. CODE-026
5. aoi tori no yukue (performed by Mika Arisaka)
6. menterae
7. GOING (performed by Kaori)
8. JUST (Interlude)
9. THE NEPHILIMS (performed by Afrika Bambaataa)
10. kanashiki hyouryuu (performed by DJ MA$A)
11. SEE THE LIGHT (performed by Smooth Bee and his family)
12. tobira (performed by DJ MA$A)
13. GENERATION WAR
14. ENVIOUS
15. DIS~ (Terra Mix; performed by Mika Arisaka)

== Reception ==
The reviewer at THEM Anime Reviews awarded it 4 stars out of 5, calling it "a solid, solid release". The first part of the show (DVD vol. 1) was reviewed for Anime News Network, where the reviewer awarded the show a B score, writing that "if you're looking for a science-fiction series that sidesteps the cookie-cutter tendencies of most other genre series, Infinie Ryvius is a can't-miss.".

In The Encyclopedia of Science Fiction, the show is described stylistically austere and largely humourless, with focus on group dynamics, interpersonal conflict, fear, and loss of innocence rather than fan service, politics and mecha combat spectacle that distinguishes it from most other anime Military SF/Space Operas. The entry notes that reviewers lauded its complex, evolving characters; some criticism was aimed at its deliberate pacing and occasionally rough animation, but these drawbacks did little to overshadow the narrative's intensity. SFE concludes that Infinite Ryvius is "now regarded as a notable late-1990s experiment in psychologically driven anime space opera, marrying mecha-action tropes with a Lord of the Flies closed-environment allegory to deliver a thought-provoking study of youth and society adrift in the void".

== Accolades ==
In 2000, Infinite Ryvius won an award for Best TV Animation at the fifth Animation Kobe.
