= Lai Ann =

Lai Ann 賴安
- Born: July 16 Taipei, Taiwan
- Pseudonyms: Ryan, Ryan Lai
- Awards: 2008 Outstanding Comic Awards, Me and My Anina

Lai Ann (Chinese: 賴安), sometimes credited as "Ryan" or "Ryan Lai", is a comics author and illustrator of Taiwanese manhua. She was born July 16 in Taipei, Taiwan, and is published by Tong Li Comics. Her two-volume work Me and My Ainia won a 2008 Outstanding Comics Award from the Institute for Compilation and Translation of Taiwan.

== Publications ==
Lai Ann has written numerous manhua series of varying length. They include:

- The Internship of Angel (天使的人間實習), 2008
- Me and My Ainia (我和我的艾尼亞), 2007–2008
- Steel Rose (鋼鐵玫瑰), 2005–2007
- Ingènuo (戀影天使), 1998–2004
- The Royal (薔薇豪情), 1995–1996
- It's Only Love (愛‧神話), 1994–2001
- Pure Love (純愛手記), 1994–2001
- Angel Hair (天堂絲絨), 1994–2001
- Falling Peony (落花), 1992–1995

She has also produced special art collections, such as Desire Carnival (賴安明信片書, 2000), Live Show (筆記書, 2002), and Anniversary (賴安彩繪自選集, 2003).
