= The Other Side of the Mirror (manhua) =

- Cover, The Other Side of the Mirror volume 1

鏡子的另一邊
- Genre: Romantic comedy
- Author: Jo Chen
- Publisher: Tong Li Comics (Taiwan)
- English publisher: US: Tokyopop
- Magazine: Star Girls (Taiwan)
- Original run: 1998–1999
- Collected volumes: 2

The Other Side of the Mirror (Chinese: 鏡子的另一邊) is a comic written and illustrated by Jo Chen. It was originally published by Tong Li Comics in Taiwan and has been translated into several languages, including English.

== Publication ==
The Other Side of the Mirror was originally serialized in Taiwan from July 1998 to February 1999 in Star Girls, and later collected in two volumes by Tong Li Comics. It was Chen's first full-length manhua. Volume 1 included a short story entitled "99 Roses", and volume 2 included "Peggy" and "The Funeral Procession of Stars", all originally published in Star Girls in its March, May, and July 1999 issues, respectively. The collected volumes were soon thereafter published in South Korea, China, and Hong Kong.

At Anime Expo in June 2007, Tokyopop announced it had licensed The Other Side of the Mirror for release in English. In December 2007, Tokyopop published volume one of the series, and in April 2008, volume two. Translation was provided by J.Y. Standaert with an adaptation by Kereth Cowe-Spigai, and the cover featured praise from Joss Whedon. The release included the short stories included with the original Taiwanese volumes, plus an interview and sketches by Chen. Chen promoted the release at the 2007 New York Anime Festival and Anime USA 2007, an event to which she will return in 2008. In 2008, the series was also published in Italian by JPOP.

== Reception ==
Chen admitted for years she never thought Western audiences would care to read The Other Side of the Mirror, despite selling well and winning an award in its native language. One reviewer described the English-language release of the work as a "quirky combination of dreamy romance and slapstick comedy". Another felt that though Chen's illustrations were "gorgeous" the story at the heart of the work was slightly lacking, and that Chen was still "miles above the pack" in terms of style, artistry, and storytelling ability. The series' art was described as a "refreshing change" from other works in the genre, which ably improved a mediocre story.
