= Gin'iro no Olynssis =

Japanese anime television series

- Giniro no Olynssis
- Cover of the light novel.

銀色のオリンシス (Giniro no Orinshisu)
- Created by: Izumi Todo
- Light novel
- Written by: Hitomi Amamiya
- Illustrated by: Hisashi Hirai
- Published by: MediaWorks
- Magazine: Dengeki Maoh
- Original run: November 2006 – April 2007
- Volumes: 1
- Anime television series
- Directed by: Katsumi Tokoro
- Produced by: Mikio Uetsuki; Takashi Nishimoto; Satoshi Matsui; Takao Yoshizawa
- Written by: Yuichiro Takeda
- Music by: Yugo Kanno
- Studio: Toei Animation
- Original network: Nagoya TV, Chiba TV, TV Saitama, Tokyo MX, KBS Kyoto, ABC
- Original run: October 5, 2006 – December 21, 2006
- Episodes: 12
- icon

Giniro no Olynssis (銀色のオリンシス, Giniro no Orinshisu; lit. Olynssis of Silver), literally translating to Olynssis of Silver, is a Japanese anime television series animated by Toei Animation. It aired in Japan from October 5, 2006, to December 21, 2006. A light novel by Hitomi Amamiya and illustrations by Hisashi Hirai was serialized in the MediaWorks magazine Dengeki Maoh in November 2006.

== Plot ==
The story takes place during a fictional future, in the year 3567. During this time, a supernatural barrier called the Olynssis barrier, which disrupts space and time, envelops all of Earth. The planet is also being overrun by organic bug-like machines called Gardeners, which seek to exterminate all humans in order to "save and preserve" the planet. Tokito Aizawa is part of a group of hunters who destroys Gardeners and sells the scraps using mecha called Crawlers. Although, after encountering a girl named Tea, who constantly calls him "Koichi", and her giant machine, Silver, his life becomes more complicated.

== Media ==
The series began broadcast on the Japanese television network Asahi Broadcasting Corporation (ABC) on October 5, 2006. It is directed by Katsumi Tokoro and produced by Toei Animation. Other networks such as Tokyo MX TV and Chiba TV also aired the episodes at later dates. A total of twelve episodes aired, with the last airing on December 21, 2006.

The anime was compiled into six DVD volumes; the limited edition, director's cut editions of the volumes had consecutive monthly releases in 2007. A box set containing all the volumes was released on January 21, 2007.

=== Episode list ===
No.	Title	Directed by	Written by	Original release date
1	"Light Blue Reincarnation"; Transliteration: "Mizuiro no Saisei" (Japanese: 水色の再生)	Directed by : Shinichi Masaki; Storyboarded by : Masashi Ikeda	Yuichiro Takeda	October 5, 2006
2	"Crimson Journey"; Transliteration: "Akaneiro no Tabidachi" (Japanese: 茜色の旅立ち)	Directed by : Yukio Okazaki; Storyboarded by : Shinichi Tokairin	Yuichiro Takeda	October 12, 2006
3	"Black Visitor"; Transliteration: "Kokushoku no Raihōsha" (Japanese: 黒色の来訪者)	Directed by : Toshiaki Kamihara; Storyboarded by : Konomi Sakurai	Yuichiro Takeda	October 19, 2006
4	"Grey Battlefield"; Transliteration: "Haiiro no Senjō" (Japanese: 灰色の戦場)	Shigeharu Takahashi	Yuichiro Takeda	October 26, 2006
5	"Green Maze"; Transliteration: "Midoriiro no Meikyū" (Japanese: 緑色の迷宮)	Directed by : Akihiko Nishiyama; Storyboarded by : Ryoji Fujiwara	Yuichiro Takeda	November 2, 2006
6	"Golden Demon"; Transliteration: "Kin'iro no Akuma" (Japanese: 金色の悪魔)	Directed by : Toru Yamada; Storyboarded by : Masashi Ikeda	Yuichiro Takeda	November 9, 2006
7	"Red Bonds"; Transliteration: "Sekishoku no Kizuna" (Japanese: 赤色の絆)	Kazunari Kuki	Yuichiro Takeda	November 16, 2006
8	"Tear-Colored Decision"; Transliteration: "Namida iro no Ketsui" (Japanese: 涙色の決意)	Directed by : Yoshikata Nitta; Storyboarded by : Kōnosuke Uda	Yuichiro Takeda	November 23, 2006
9	"Grief-Colored Gravestone"; Transliteration: "Aishoku no Bohyō" (Japanese: 哀色の墓標)	Directed by : Yukio Okazaki; Storyboarded by : Kiyoshi Egami	Yuichiro Takeda	November 30, 2006
10	"Lead-Colored Orbit"; Transliteration: "Namariiro no Kidō" (Japanese: 鉛色の軌道)	Directed by : Shigeharu Takahashi; Storyboarded by : Kiyoshi Egami	Yuichiro Takeda	December 7, 2006
11	"Scarlet Universe"; Transliteration: "Hīro no Uchū" (Japanese: 緋色の宇宙)	Directed by : Akihiko Nishiyama; Storyboarded by : Ryoji Fujiwara	Yuichiro Takeda	December 14, 2006
12	"Silver Future"; Transliteration: "Gin'iro no Mirai" (Japanese: 銀色の未来)	Directed by : Shinichi Masaki; Storyboarded by : Katsumi Tokoro	Yuichiro Takeda	December 21, 2006

=== Music ===
Two pieces of theme music are used for the anime episodes; one opening theme and one ending theme. The opening theme is "destiny" by CHiYo, while the ending theme is "Saraba Seishun no Hibi" by the Inazuma Sentai. CHiYo released a single for "destiny" on November 20, 2006, which is the seventh single she has released since her debut.

=== Staff ===
- Director: Katsumi Tokoro
- Series Composition, Scenario: Yuichiro Takeda
- Character Design: Hisashi Hirai
- Chief Character Animation Director: Hideaki Maniwa
- Olynssis Mechanical Design: Yoshikazu Miyao, Hitoshi Fukuchi
- Guest Mechanical Design, Chief Mecha Animation Director: Masahiro Shimanuki
- Art director: Takashi Yoshiike
- Colour Design: Tsutomu Tsukada
- Music: Yugo Kanno
- Planning Collaboration: Hitomi Amemiya, Dengeki Maoh
- Production: Gin-iro no Olynssis Production Committee(Asahi Broadcasting, Nagoya TV, Happinet, Toei Animation)
