= Hisashi Hirai =

Japanese manga artist

- 平井久司
- Born: Tokyo, Japan
- Occupations: Animator, character Designer

Hisashi Hirai (平井久司, Hirai Hisashi; born on May 27) is a Japanese animator, character designer, and manga artist. He is noted for his work with Sunrise, having worked on Infinite Ryvius, s-CRY-ed, Gundam SEED, Gundam SEED Destiny and Fafner of the Azure. He was also the lead animator for Linebarrels of Iron.

== Works ==
=== Anime ===
List of works in anime
Year	Series	Crew role	Notes	Source
1985	Dancouga – Super Beast Machine God	Design		
1992	Dragon Slayer	Character Design, Animation Director (Nakamura Pro)	Also SNES version	
1994	Wild 7	Character Design (Nakamura Pro), Animation Director (Nakamura Pro; ep. 1)		
1995	Wild Knights Gulkeeva	Character Design, Animation Director (Nakamura Pro), Art design, Animation (OP; ED; DN)		
1995	The Silent Service	Character Design, Animation Director, Mechanical design, Key Animation		
1999	Infinite Ryvius	Character Design, Animation Director (OP), ED Illustrations, Key Animation (episodes 14, 20, 26)		
2001	s-CRY-ed	Character Design, Character Animation Director (episodes 1, 16, 26), Chief Character Animation Director, Key Animation (episode 26), Mechanical animation Director (episode 11), Opening/Ending Animation Director		
2002	Mobile Suit Gundam SEED	Character designer		
2004	My-HiME	Element gun design		
2004	Fafner in the Azure	Character Design, Key Animation (OP/ED; episode 25)		
2004	Mobile Suit Gundam SEED Destiny	Character designer		
2006	Gin'iro no Olynssis	Character Design		
2007	Heroic Age	Character Design, Chief Animation Director, Animation Director (OP; ED)		
2008	Linebarrels of Iron	Character Design, Chief Animation Director, Animation Director (OP; episode 1)		
2010	Fafner in the Azure: Heaven and Earth	Character Design, Character Supervision, Key Animation	feature film	
2013	Majestic Prince	Character Design, Animation Director (OP 1–2; ED2; episode 1), Key Animation (OP1; ED1)	Nominated–Character design, 3rd Newtype Anime Awards	
2015	Fafner in the Azure: Exodus	Character Design, Animation Director (character; OP; ED), Animation (ED for episode 9), Assistant Animation Director (character; episode 1), Key Animation (episodes 2–5, 9), Photo Key Animation (episode 11)		

=== Video games ===
List of works in video games
Year	Series	Crew role	Notes	Source
2015	Xuccess Heaven	Character design	smartphone RPG	
