= Nao Takamori =

Japanese voice actress

Nao Takamori (高森 奈緒, Takamori Nao; born October 10, 1973) is a Japanese voice actress from Chiba Prefecture formerly affiliated with Production Ace.

== Filmography ==
=== Television animation ===
- Aquarian Age: Sign for Evolution (Receptionist, nurse)
- Bakugan Battle Brawlers (Wavern)
- Bakugan Battle Brawlers: New Vestroia (Wavern)
- Banner of the Stars (Kotoponī, crew)
- Carried by the Wind: Tsukikage Ran (Kuma)
- Detective Conan (Beauty artist, housekeeper, woman, companion, others)
- Crest of the Stars (Crew)
- Devil Lady (Emiko Sakazawa, stylist, model, underclassmen, others)
- Dual! Parallel Trouble Adventure (Kaori Hayase)
- Ghost Stories (Child)
- Go! Go! Itsutsugo Land (Boy, henchman)
- I My Me! Strawberry Eggs (Miho Umeda's mother, music teacher)
- Kokoro Library (Kājīenjeru)
- Magical Girl Lyrical Nanoha StrikerS (Carim Gracia)
- Magical Girl Lyrical Nanoha Vivid (Carim Gracia)
- Maico 2010 (Izumi)
- Mon Colle Knights (Ma Kami Tōbatsu Tai)
- Please Teacher! (Todoroki's wife)
- Sasami: Mahou Shōjo Club (Mayoko-sensei)
- Secret of Cerulean Sand (Hanan Village woman)
- Tenchi Muyo! GXP (Gyokuren)
- Turn A Gundam (Belleen Bondo)

=== Video games ===
- Bloody Roar 4 (Nagi)
- Onimusha series (Kaede)
- Suikoden IV (Katarina Cott)
- Suikoden Tactics (Katarina Cott)
- The Oneechanbara series (Saki)
- Sonic the Hedgehog series (Blaze the Cat)
- Wild Arms 4 (Enil Aidem)
- Xenoblade Chronicles X (Irina)

=== Drama CDs ===
- Princess Princess (Yuujirou Shihoudani)

=== Dubbing roles ===
==== Live-action ====
- Cory in the House (Samantha Samuels)
- Duets (Liv Dean (Gwyneth Paltrow))
- Flight (Nicole (Kelly Reilly))
- Lost (Kate Austen)
- The Rock (1999 NTV edition) (Jade Angelou (Claire Forlani))
- School of Rock (Patty Di Marco (Sarah Silverman))
- The Twilight Zone (Donna Saicheck (Bonnie Somerville)) (Episode:How Much Do You Love Your Kid?)
- Unbreakable (Child)
- The Virgin Suicides (Mary Lisbon (A. J. Cook))

==== Animation ====
- Thomas and Friends (Mirabel, Dulce and Victoria)
- Little Bear (Mendori)
