= DrMaster =

American distributor of manga and manhua

- Industry: Comics
- Founded: 2004
- Defunct: 2009
- Fate: Bankruptcy
- Headquarters: United States, Fremont, California
- Products: Manga, manhua

DrMaster Publications Inc. was an American distributor of manga and manhua with offices in the United States, Republic of China and Japan. It was headquartered in Fremont, California.

It began strictly as a printer of manga, and entered the publishing business after taking over most of ComicsOne's manga and manhua titles.

DrMaster's Publications Inc. went out of business around 2009 and its offices in Fremont are gone. The building was later occupied by Sunesys Telecommunications.

== Manga ==
Cover for the Dr Master release of Cosplay Koromo-chan

- 888
- Category: Freaks
- Cosplay Koromo-chan
- Dark Edge
- High School Girls
- Hinadori Girl
- Imperfect Hero
- Indian Summer
- Infinite Ryvius
- Iron Wok Jan
- Maniac Road
- Metro Survive
- Pretty Maniacs
- Premature Priest
- Red Prowling Devil
- Junk Force
- Junk: Record of the Last Hero
- Onegai Twins
- Tori Koro
- Stellvia
- Stray Little Devil
- Tsukihime: Lunar Legend

== Manhua ==
- Chronicles of the Vampire Hunter: Claws of Darkness
- Four Constables, The
- King of Fighters
- Real Fake Princess
- SNK vs Capcom
- Chinese Hero: Tales of the Blood Sword
- Divine Melody
- Feng Shui Academy

== Novels ==
- Junk Force
- Onegai Twins
- RahXephon
