= ComicsOne =

Defunct American publishing company

- Industry: Comics
- Founded: 1999
- Defunct: March 2005
- Headquarters: Fremont, California, United States
- Website: www.comicsone.com

ComicsOne Corp. was an American distributor of Asian Comics (manga, manhwa, and manhua), established in 1999. ComicsOne was based in Fremont, California, in the San Francisco Bay Area. ComicsOne also served as the distributor for videos and merchandise related to its licensed titles.

== History ==
On March 25, 2005, industry website ICv2 reported that DrMaster, ComicsOne's Asian printer, took over the publication of ComicsOne's manga titles, though not the manhwa and manhua titles. It also added that ComicsOne had abandoned its website, "stopped paying its bills and has disappeared."

== Manga published by ComicsOne ==
First tankōbon volume cover of Maico 2010.

- 888
- Bass Master Ranmaru
- Bride of Deimos
- Crayon Shin-chan
- Dark Edge
- Devil in the Water
- Ginga Legend Weed
- Goku Midnight Eye
- Hamster Club
- High School Girls
- Infinite Ryvius
- Iron Wok Jan!
- Jesus
- Joan
- Junk Force
- Karasu Tengu Kabuto
- Kazan
- Maico 2010
- Mourning of Autumn Rain
- NaNaNaNa (co-published with Infinity Studios)
- Offered
- Please Friends series
  - Please Teacher!
  - Please Twins!
- Pretty Maniacs
- Red Prowling Devil
- Sarai
- Sister Red
- Tomie (later published by Dark Horse Comics)
- Tsukihime, Lunar Legend
- Wild 7
- Wounded Man

== Manhwa published by ComicsOne ==
- My Sassy Girl
- NOW
- Red Moon

== Manhua published by ComicsOne ==
- Black Leopard
- Crouching Tiger, Hidden Dragon (by Andy Seto)
- Fung Wan
- HERO
- Legendary Couple
- Mega Dragon and Tiger
- Saint Legend
- Shaolin Soccer
- The Heaven Sword and Dragon Saber
- The King of Fighters 2003
- Story of the Tao
- Weapons of the Gods
