= Red Prowling Devil =

Japanese manga series by Toshimitsu Shimizu

紅 (Kurenai)
- Manga
- Written by: Toshimitsu Shimizu
- Published by: Shōnen Gahousha
- English publisher: NA: ComicsOne
- Magazine: Young King
- Original run: October 1, 1999 – 2002
- Volumes: 8

Red Prowling Devil (Japanese: 紅, Hepburn: Kurenai; lit. "Crimson") is a Japanese manga series created by Toshimitsu Shimizu, published in Japan by Shōnen Gahousha and spanning eight volumes (or tankōbon). An English translation of the series, covering all eight volumes in flipped format, was published in the United States by the (now apparently defunct) ComicsOne corporation, starting in October 2002.

== Plot ==
The story of Red Prowling Devil centers on Naomi, a pilot who ends up working as an operative for a secretive world power as a way out of a life sentence for accidentally shooting down a plane full of civilians. Naomi feels deeply guilty about her crime and probably would have accepted imprisonment if it were not for an ill loved one depending on the money she earns from flying missions in her red-painted MiG-29.

Naomi's assignments take her to locales around the globe, and the ace MiG pilot becomes world-famous (or infamous) as the "Red Prowling Devil," targeted by rival pilots from world air forces and terrorist organizations.
