= Tong Li Publishing =

Taiwanese publishing company

Tongli Publishing Co. 東立出版社有限公司
- Company type: Comic publisher
- Industry: Comics
- Founded: 1977
- Founder: Fang Wan-nan
- Headquarters: Taipei, Taiwan
- Website: www.tongli.com.tw(in Chinese)

Tongli Publishing Co. (Chinese: 東立出版社, Hanyu Pinyin: Dōng Lì Chūbǎnshè), most known as Tong Li Comics, is a publishing company which distributes a variety of domestic and imported comics in Taiwan.

== History ==
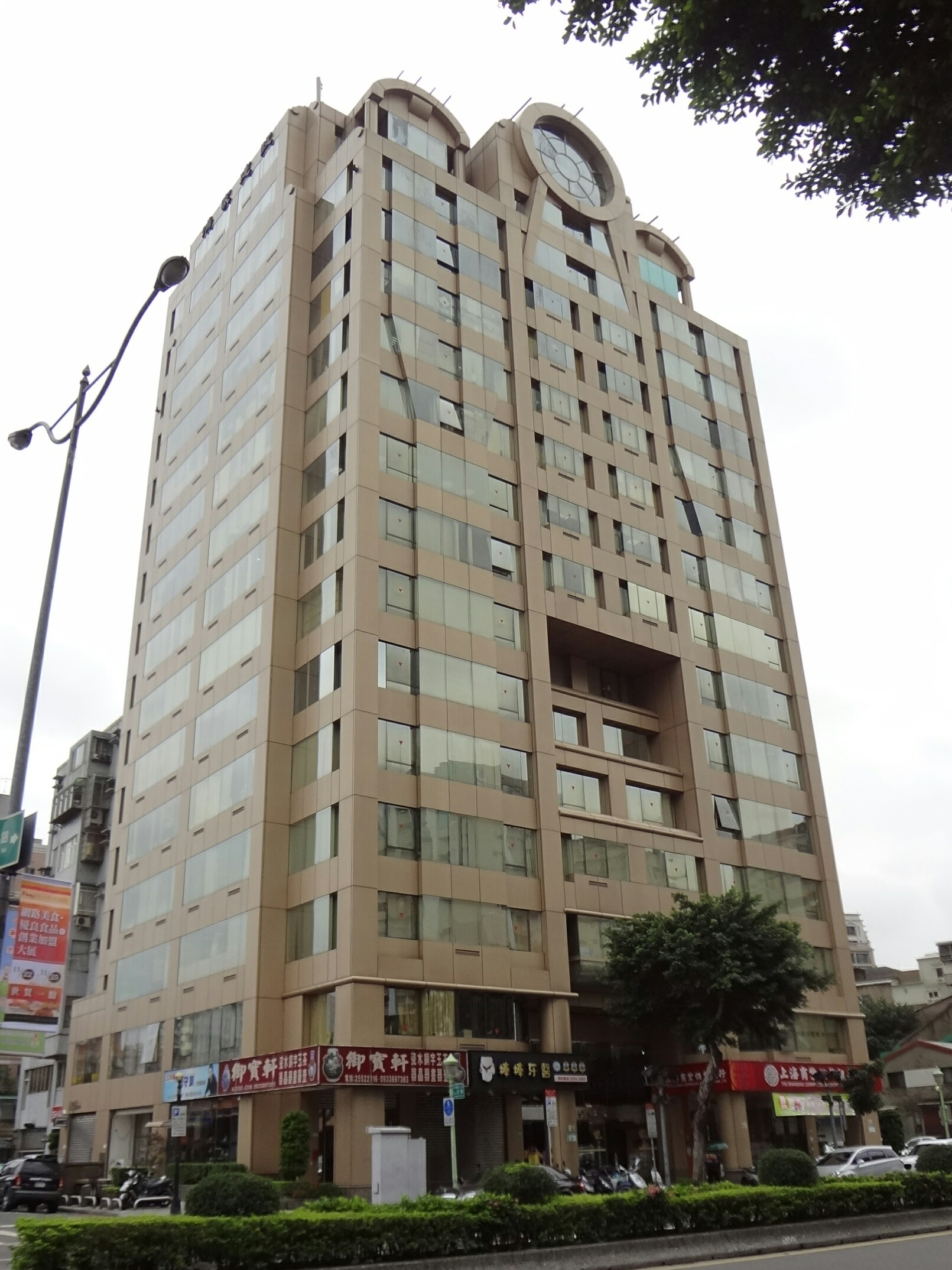
Tong Li Publishing head office in "State Capital Economic and Trade Building"(首府經貿大廈)

Tong Li was founded in Tainan, Taiwan in 1977 with a mere nine employees. Tong Li entered the publishing business as a seller of illegally copied comic books. "For fifteen years, Tong Li was the largest producer of pirated comics, redoing more than 1,000 titles in all, and for part of that time, fifty a month."

Tong Li's original method of operation was to procure new comics from Japanese distributors, replacing the Japanese text with traditional Chinese, and "drawing bras on bare-breasted women characters and modifying, up to what they could get away with, explicitly sexual or violent panels". The head of Tong Li, Fang Wan-nan(范萬楠), "jokingly referred to himself as the 'king of pirated comics'".

Despite the copyright violation trend, Tong Li procured Taiwan's first legal license for Japanese manga with Minako Narita's Cipher from Hakusensha in 1989, and followed with Katsuhiro Otomo's Akira from Kodansha in 1991. A 1992 Taiwanese law strengthening the copyright enforcement of comics forced Tong Li to abandon the copying and develop original content in addition to acquiring licenses through legal means, at which point it began publishing the magazines Dragon Youth (龍少年月刊) and Star★Girls (星少女月刊) - titles which retained the considerable influence of Japanese manga. It currently releases over 100 licensed manga titles a month includes One Piece, Bleach, Naruto, Saiyuki, Sket Dance, Hunter x Hunter, Gintama, Shijō Saikyō no Deshi Ken'ichi, Skip Beat, and more.

== Manga Magazines published by Tong Li Publishing ==
- Dragon Youth Comic
- New Youth Express
- New Youth Express Monthly
- Formosa Youth
- Young Flower
- Star Girls
- New Youth Weekly

== See also ==
- List of companies of Taiwan
