= Rika Hayashi =

Japanese voice actress

- はやし りか
- Born: 1 June
- Occupation: Voice actress
- Employer: Arts Vision
- Notable work: Tonbo! as Tonbo Ōi
- Awards: Seiyu Award for Best Rookie Actor (2025)

Rika Hayashi (Japanese: はやし りか, Hepburn: Hayashi Rika; born 1 June) is a Japanese voice actress affiliated with Arts Vision. She starred as Tonbo Ōi in Tonbo! and won the Seiyu Award for Best Rookie Actor at the 19th Seiyu Awards.

== Biography ==
Rika Hayashi, a native of Hashimoto, Wakayama, was born on 1 June. Her mother was a former caddie. While she was a young child, she would visit a driving range her parents took her to every week after getting a golf club as a gift, and at least once she curiously made a ball roll down an uneven surface there. However, Hayashi recalled that she rarely played golf and was unfamiliar with the sport's terminology.

Inspired to go into voice acting after being hospitalized as a youth, she was educated at the Japan Narration Acting Institute. She made her voice acting debut during the COVID-19 pandemic in Japan, later recalling the first few years of her career as "being concurrent with COVID". (Note: (Felt like) being in the same class with COVID (コロナと同期, Corona to dōki)) In 2024, she had minor roles in Alya Sometimes Hides Her Feelings in Russian, Magilumiere Magical Girls Inc., and Terminator Zero.

In 2024, she made her first starring role as Tonbo Ōi in the golf-themed anime Tonbo!; this was the first work she passed through an audition. At the beginning of recording she would bring a golf club to the studio. She also sang the anime's ending theme "Let's Swing" alongside Tokyo Groove Jyoshi. In 2025, she won the Seiyu Award for Best Rookie Actor at the 19th Seiyu Awards.

Hayashi once practiced classical ballet and collected recorded albums, particularly orchestral music.

== Filmography ==
=== Television animation ===
Year	Title	Role	Ref.
2024	Alya Sometimes Hides Her Feelings in Russian	Soccer team manager	
2024	Magilumiere Magical Girls Inc.	Miyakodo employee	
2024	Terminator Zero	Children at playground	
2024	Tonbo!	Tonbo Ōi	
