= Shotaro Uzawa =

Japanese actor (born 1997)

- 鵜澤 正太郎
- Born: 22 January 1997 (age 29)
- Occupation: Actor
- Employer: 81 Produce
- Notable work: Kiyoshi Satō in Welcome to the Space Show; Win Kirifuda in Duel Masters Win; Tenshi Dei in Kawagoe Boys Sing
- Awards: Seiyu Award for Best Rookie Actor (2025)

Shotaro Uzawa (Japanese: 鵜澤 正太郎, Hepburn: Uzawa Shōtarō; born 22 January 1997) is a Japanese voice actor affiliated with 81 Produce. Originally a child actor, he starred as Kiyoshi Satō in Welcome to the Space Show. Since then, he has starred as Win Kirifuda in Duel Masters Win (2022-2024) and Tenshi Dei in Kawagoe Boys Sing (2023-2024), and he won the Seiyu Award for Best Rookie Actor at the 19th Seiyu Awards.

== Biography ==
Shotaro Uzawa, a native of Chiba Prefecture, was born on 22 January 1997. He originally work as a child actor for the children's theatre troupe Nihon Jido, and he appeared in several television commercials and as a Japanese-language dub actor for foreign works. He voiced Dajh Katzroy in the 2009 video game Final Fantasy XIII.

Uzawa was cast in his first major anime role as Kiyoshi Satō in the 2010 film Welcome to the Space Show; he later credited anime sound director Hiromi Kikuta with giving him the role. In 2010, he won the 1st Bowler Project Jury Special Award. In April 2018, he joined 81 Produce and began working as a voice actor.

In December 2020, Uzawa appeared as Ushimitsu in the stage play With by Idol Time PriPara, performed at Zepp DiverCity. Since 2022, he has starred as Police Braver in Tomica Heroes Jobraver. In August 2022, it was announced he would star as Win Kirifuda, the main character in Duel Masters Win. He starred as Tenshi Dei in the 2023–2024 anime Kawagoe Boys Sing. In 2025, he won the Seiyu Award for Best Rookie Actor at the 19th Seiyu Awards.

== Filmography ==
=== Television animation ===
Year	Title	Role	Ref.
2022	Duel Masters Win	Win Kirifuda	
2022	Komi Can't Communicate	Chūshaku Kometani	
2023	High Card	Rummy College student	
2023–2024	Kawagoe Boys Sing	Tenshi Dei	
2024	Fate/strange Fake: Whispers of Dawn	Langal's apprentice	
2024	Mechanical Arms	Naokata, Imada's underlings, Kagami Group member	

=== Animated film ===
Year	Title	Role	Ref.
2010	Welcome to the Space Show	Kiyoshi Satō	

=== Video games ===
Year	Title	Role	Ref.
2009	Final Fantasy XIII	Dajh Katzroy	
2021	Balan Wonderworld	Attilio Caccini	

=== Original net animation ===
Year	Title	Role	Ref.
2022–present	Tomica Heroes Jobraver	Police Braver	

=== Stage ===
Year	Title	Role	Ref.
2020	With by Idol Time PriPara	Ushimitsu	
