= Secret of Cerulean Sand =

Japanese-Korean anime television series

- Secret of the Cerulean Sand
- French DVD cover

パタパタ飛行船の冒険 (Patapata Hikōsen no Bōken)
- Genre: Adventure, science fiction
- Anime television series
- Directed by: Yuichiro Yano
- Produced by: Shunzo Kato, Koji Takeuchi
- Studio: Telecom Animation Film
- Original network: WOWOW
- Original run: 5 January 2002 – 29 June 2002
- Episodes: 26

Secret of Cerulean Sand (パタパタ飛行船の冒険, Patapata Hikōsen no Bōken) is a 26-episode Japanese-Korean anime television series. The main character is a 15-year-old English girl named Jane Buxton, who dreams of building a flying machine due to the influence of her brother. The series documents her journey through the Near East to find her brother, who has gone missing after heading to the Near East to look for a floating liquid in an expedition. It is set in the late 19th century where impossible technologies such as landships and "floating liquid" exist side by side in a steampunk world.

The series is loosely based on two works by Jules Verne—his posthumous 1919 novel The Barsac Mission, which was largely written by his son Michel Verne (L'Étonnante Aventure de la mission Barsac, published in English in two volumes—Into the Niger Bend (Book One of the Barsac Mission), and City in the Sahara (Book Two of the Barsac Mission)) as well as his 1896 novel Facing the Flag (Face au drapeau).

It was included in Jury selections in the 2002 Japan Media Arts Festival for the animation division.

== Characters ==
Jane Buxton (ジェーン・バクストン, Jane Buxton)
Voiced by: Ema Kogure
The Main protagonist of the series, Jane is the little sister of George and stepsister of William.
George Buxton (ジョージ・バクストン, George Buxton)
Voiced by: Masakazu Suzuki
The big brother of Jane and stepbrother of William.
William Buxton (ウィリアム・ファーニー・バクストン, William Buxton)
Voiced by: Tooru Ookawa
The main antagonist of the series and stepbrother of Jane and George. He was eleven years old when his mother Marguerite married into the Buxton Family, but William did not like the new environment, stepfamily and depended on his mother. After his mother died of an illness, he felt lonelier, when Jane showed him kindness and calling his mother as her own, William begins to love Jane as his own and felt no longer alone.

== Episodes ==
.

| No. | Title | Directed by | Written by | Original release date |
|---|---|---|---|---|
| 1 | "The Three Siblings of the Buxton Family"; Transliteration: "Bakusuton-ke no san kyōdai" (Japanese: バクストン家の三兄妹) | Yuichiro Yano | Yuka Yamada | January 5, 2002 |
In the late 1800s in England, the wealthy aristocrat Edward Buxton hurries home with his son George for the birth of his second child. His wife Anna dies after giving birth to their daughter who is named Jane. A few years later Mr. Buxton marries Marguerite who has a young son named William, but William does not like his stepfamily and depends on his mother. Many months later, Marguerite is struck with illness and tells her son to be strong before passing away, days later William sees Jane go alone and follows her, Jane shows him kindness and care that causes William to love his stepsister. Many years later Jane is 10 years old who tries to create a flying machine but still fails, George is studying to find a way for humanity to have a machine that flies.
| 2 | "A Small Crack"; Transliteration: "Chiisana kiretsu" (Japanese: 小さな亀裂) | Yuichiro Yano | Kōichi Mashima | January 12, 2002 |
George talks his research to the professors at the academy about the legend of The Floating Liquid; a cerulean sand that gives the ability to fly located in the East, George and Jane shares the same dream of being able to build a flying machine and soar through the sky one day, but George couldn't convince the professors but a man named Barsac have listened to him. Mr. Buxton is trying to figure out who will be his successor and is eyeing William for his great work in the bank, but sees William talking to someone, the next day during breakfast Mr. Buxton confronts William for embezzlement the clients' money. St. Berain arrives with a letter to George, George has been accepted into an exploration team to the Middle East by Barsac. William leaves the room and Jane runs after him, William is upset and talks about getting back at Mr. Buxton. The next day, George is making preparations to leave, and promise Jane that when he returns, he and Jane will be the first people to fly. Later that night, William walks into George's room and reads his notes about the Floating Liquid, this gives William a plan.
| 3 | "The Dark Shadow Seeps Out"; Transliteration: "Nijimidashita kuroi kage" (Japanese: 滲み出した黒い陰) | Yuichiro Yano | Miwa Satojima | January 26, 2002 |
George is about to leave on his journey to the East, he can't seem to find his watch. William has left on a sudden business trip and can't be there when George leaves. Jane bids George goodbye, but William is on the same ship having the Buxton watch. Meanwhile, Mr. Buxton suspects that William has run away and finds evidence that he has taken the embezzlement money. Jane wonders why he has left without telling her. Few weeks later a letter arrives, and it says that George has been executed because of treason. Five years later, flying object is above the Buxton Bank and masked figures rob it, but a cloaked figure leaves behind a watch. Mr. Buxton is informed by the police about the robbery, and they show him the Buxton watch, Mr. Buxton is suspected of theft insurance and the stress of all of it causes him to fall ill. Jane receives an unsigned letter, but the handwriting is the same as George, and she opens it. The letter is empty, but there is a small blue stone, Jane's tear falls on it and the stone makes the water fly, and the stone turns to blue sand. Jane realizes it is the Floating Liquid and believes George is still alive and has found it. She sets out on a journey to the East together with St. Berain to find him.
| 4 | "First Voyage"; Transliteration: "Hajimete no kōkai" (Japanese: はじめての航海) | Yuichiro Yano | Yuka Yamada; Noriko Tanimura | February 2, 2002 |
Jane is getting ready to leave for her trip to find George and she and St. Berain then leave the Manor. At the harbor to take the boat at same time Mr. Barsac is going the same way, to search for the floating liquid. Jane spots a suspicious man but she is met by a dachshund dog who is owned by a rude and overbearing woman. The boat begins to leave, Jane meets the Captain of the boat and follows after him and is then met by the young sailor Banchi, the Captain tells Jane how the boat works. The woman's dog creates a commotion and Jane grabs the dog, she meets Barsac again and spot the same suspicious man who is on the same boat who appears to be tailing Barsac. Jane is bored with her studies and wants to learn about ships, Jane asks Banchi refuses to teach her. Banchi tells Jane if she can pass a test that all sailors must pass he will tell her by getting the white flag on the top of the boat, believing that she wouldn't do it but Jane is determined and he is shocked to see her climb to get the flag. Everyone sees this and Jane reach the flag but she then lose balance and falls, Jane is saved by Banchi. The Captain yells at Banchi getting Jane into danger like that as a sailor must protect the safety of the passengers, Banchi then runs off.
| 5 | "The Badge of a Sailor"; Transliteration: "Funanori no kunshō" (Japanese: 船乗りの勲章) | Yuichiro Yano | Yuka Yamada; Noriko Tanimura | February 9, 2002 |
Jane goes back to her room while St. Berain goes to eat dinner, the snobbish woman complains about the plate and the fork and the knife. Jane tells the Captain it is her fault as she insisted and Banchi tried to stop her, the Captain tells her it is Banchi himself who decide if he wants to stay a sailor or not. Jane finds Banchi who wishes to leave the ship but Jane wishes he will teach her about ships, before he leaves, which he agree to. New incident occurs as the woman's earrings has been stolen, the woman accuses Jane to have taken them as they roam around the ship late last night, and then accuse Banchi but the Captain defends him and Barsac scold the woman not to accuse someone so easily without proof. Noticing that the dog likes shiny things, Jane uses her brooch to the dog and then Jane and the others follows the dog to the storage room, the dog have collected shiny things and the woman's earrings thus the dog is behind this, the woman throws apples at her dog and is stopped. Banchi still wants to be sailor and Jane will try to create a flying machine, the ship finally arrives to the Middle East's harbour, Jane bids Barsac goodbye and to Banchi as well. The dog goes to Jane and it turns out have been abandoned by the woman, Jane decide to keep the dog and is renamed as Sky, their next one is taking the train.
| 6 | "Mr. Barsac"; Transliteration: "Baruzakku-san" (Japanese: バルザックさん) | Yuichiro Yano | Kōichi Mashima | February 16, 2002 |
Jane and St. Berain goes to the train, the man from the boat in a disguise still tails Barsac. When Jane and St. Berain can't get train tickets, Barsac offers to help them. On the train they introduce themselves, and Jane by instinct says her last name is "Stuart" and says they are on a trip to find her elder brother who is working in a faraway city. Barsac who also sort of lies by saying his work is to discover something valuable things and bring them back to their country, as they are alone St. Berain asks her why she lied about her last name and Jane says Barsac is a good man but there is something odd about him, Barsac looks at the map where George believed about the legend and Jane tells St. Berain they have to keep George a secret, the man who follows Barsac is on the same train. A woman and her child get sick and Jane together with St. Berain and Mr Barsac searches desperately for a doctor. Sadly, they won't arrive at the next station until next morning and they are in the middle of the mountains, therefore they decides to take care of them until they arrive at the next station. Meanwhile the man sends a report to a flying machine in the sky. Barsac is reminded by the time that his wife Amanda and his daughter Karen died from sickness. The woman and girl survives and travels to a doctor the next day. While Jane and Barsac continue he talks about how he lost his wife and daughter in an influenza epidemic, because the doctor couldn't help them as the bridge was washed away, Jane realize to Barsac what he meant about having wings and can go anywhere. Once they arrive the city in the east, they say goodbye to Barsac and the man is seen talking to his mysterious boss who tells him infiltrate Barsac and his men, he then sees Jane and is surprised to see her. Meanwhile, Barsac is readying his team for the search for the floating liquid and the other mission is to subdue the mysterious band of bandits that is attacking the area, and with the captain Marcenay are going to lead the team.
| 7 | "A New Encounter"; Transliteration: "Atarashii deai" (Japanese: 新しい出会い) | Yuichiro Yano | Yuka Yamada | February 23, 2002 |
Jane and St. Berain explorers the eastern town, while Barsac and his team is loading the sand ships. A group of street children led by Saburi plans to take the wallet. When Jane chases Sky who ran away, St. Berain runs into Saburi who tells him about a shortcut. But Saburi and the other street children surrounds him and tries to steal his wallet. Jane stops them and St. Berain catch Saburi, Saburi tells the children to run away. Jane tells St. Berain to let him go as he is still a child and Saburi runs away. One of the other children hurts his foot as they try to run away, the other children brings him back home to the clock tower and lets Jane and St. Berain follow. In the clock tower the children tells them that Saburi wanted to help his sick friend Aiji. While they eat the food Jane brought them, she talks about flying machine. Saburi, who's been watching them, gets jealous and runs out. Later in the night, he returns and finds some food Jane left for him. The next day, Saburi is willing to help them because they helped his friends, Jane tells him they need a desert guide and get transport to travel through the desert, Jane tells him she is looking for her elder brother, Saburi agrees to be their guide and goes to find transport and a pilot for them. Barsac and his men are ready to leave in their desert ship while the man have infiltrated them. Saburi get doubts about leaving the children, when they are getting ready to leave Saburi comes and tell them that he can't leave his friends. Jane understands and thanking him for finding the transport. Suddenly the other children comes running and tell him that he can leave because they have all found jobs and they all wait for Saburi to come back. They say farewell and watches as they leave.
| 8 | "To The Desert"; Transliteration: "Sabaku e" (Japanese: 砂漠へ) | Yuichiro Yano | Yuka Yamada | March 2, 2002 |
As they travel the desert Jane is fascinated how the sand yacht works, while Barsac embarks on the large sand battleship, they see something and Marcenay points for Barsac, but it is only a mirage of the battleship. Jane go passionate about piloting a sand yacht and tries to pilot one, but she loses control and the vehicle crashes at the bottom of a dune. The group therefore stops while the pilots carry out the repairs, the heat of the desert strikes St. Berain who suffers from a serious sunstroke, at night Saburi and Jane talk about St. Berain. Meanwhile, during a sandstorm a flying machine appears and inside of it are people and a giant blue stone in a tank, the ship begins to fall and they use the lamps at the tank, the ship flies low and they fly above the battleship, Barsac sees the ship and both ships barely avoid colliding, Barsac and Marecnay are unsure what they saw. In the morning Saburi get eggs from a snake, he starts frying the eggs and gives them to St. Berain, the boss scold his underling for repairing the yacht and tells him to hurry with other things. At Barsac and Marcenay they find a piece that fell from the sky and they the way object looks it belongs to a ship, Barsac is convinced more that if the Floating Liquid exists then a machine could fly, the man who infiltrated them is annoyed that Barsac begins to figure things out. Saburi finds that the repairs are not finished yet and finds all the supplies are on the other yacht, Saburi realize something is wrong here. At night Saburi goes to Jane that they have to leave right now, their guides are imposters who intends to kill them as they were after her money from the start, Saburi points out that they leave tomorrow yet the repairs on their sand yacht are still not finished because one yacht is enough for the imposters, Jane still doesn't believes this but Saburi says his hunches are always right and St. Berain tells Jane they have to flee now as he begins to recover. They go to the other sand yacht, the imposters noticed they have fled and they chase after them.
| 9 | "The Sandstorm"; Transliteration: "Sunaarashi" (Japanese: 砂嵐) | Yuichiro Yano | Yuka Yamada | March 9, 2002 |
Jane and the group continues to escape from the two crooks, they almost catches up to them and Saburi throws all of their provisions out of the yacht at them, the underlig being a kind man don't want to harm them so he makes the yacht throw off his boss, the crooks then leave to go home as Jane's group leaves. Marcenay informs Barsac that a sandstorm is coming, while talking about to subdue the mysterious band of bandits, Marcenay suggests to go to Tarlmel to find clues, the city is the place where George Buxton go executed and Marcenay thinks George had some links with the bandits, but Barsac says George was not that kind of person to be behind them, Barsac remembers when George talked about the Floating Liquid and that George have discovered it. Jane and the group tries to continue as the wind dies down, and they end up effectively stranded in the desert. They remain there with no food or water to survive on long enough for all of them to pass out from the heat. Only half conscious, Jane vaguely sees a flying machine fly above them, a trunk is lowered from it and lands next to them in purpose. When Saburi goes to open it, he finds a bunch of provision and including water, when the wind picks up again they resume their journey. At night St. Berain tells Saburi how Jane's mother died and remembers when Jane was little she asked her father to see her mother, her father told her that her mother are in the heaven in the sky, one day Jane climbed and got stuck up in a tree, young William climbed up to rescue Jane, Williams asks why Jane climbed the tree and Jane answers she wanted to go near the sky as her mother is there which William share the loss of his mother. The group then very quickly come face with a sandstorm, they try to escape from it and are rescued by the people from the battleship, on board they are met by the crew, Jane and Barsac are reunited once again. During dinner Barsac asks Jane about seeing her elder brother in that town and why is she travelling through the desert, Jane lies that her brother left to Tarlmel and decided to go there as well. Barsac tells the truth that they are following a mysterious band of bandits that has appeared in the East, attacking and looting villages, their goal is to find out who they are and stop them. While walking, Jane passes by the man which she gets the feeling of having met him before.
| 10 | "The Things I Can Do"; Transliteration: "Watashi ni dekiru koto" (Japanese: 私に出来ること) | Yuichiro Yano | Miwa Satojima | March 16, 2002 |
Jane goes to the engine room to look around, but the chief engineer tells her that this is a work place and she have to leave. Jane tells Barsac that she feels bad that they are the only ones who aren't working, but Barsac says they can't allow passengers to do a thing like that and that she don't have to worry, Jane tells St. Berain and Saburi about helping with the work and St. Berain agrees but Saburi understandably refuses. The sandship arrives at an oasis, Barsac asks the man revealed to named Morilire how much long they get past the desert, Morilire says it takes more time to reach the end. As they fill the ship with water, something is wrong with the pipes. Jane asks Saburi about she said last night and Saburi now agrees to her, Jane pesters Barsac about letting her, St. Berain and Saburi help the crew. Wanting to make Jane happy, Barsac allows them to help, assigning St. Berain and Saburi to help with the engine room and Jane to help out in the kitchens. Next day Saburi and St. Berain makes a mess with the coal, Jane doesn't know how to peel potatoes and goes to fetch the eggs, but her apron gets stuck in the refrigerator door and causes a huge mess with the food and the cooks. Jane makes breakfast for everyone, but they get to experience Jane's poor cooking skills, the chief cook and chief engineer go complain to Barsac that they make it impossible to make any work done, Barsac tells the three that they can't help out anymore. Jane being so stubborn asks Barsac to give them another chance, Jane wants to be in the engine room as she knows a lot about machinery while the others are in the kitchen. As Jane does her work, she notices something strange with the pipe, Jane astonishes everyone with her amazing engineering skills. Then alarm goes that water is leaking from the pipe, the front is being held but the back is too narrow to reach, if nothing is done the boiler is going to blow up. Jane decide to go there as she fit to reach, Jane reach the back and begins to screw it, the pipe stops leaking, the crew and the chief engineer thanks Jane and asks her to help them in the engine room again.
| 11 | "The Mystery of the Shipwreck and the Cerulean Sand"; Transliteration: "Nanpasen to aoi suna no nazo" (Japanese: 難破船と青い砂の謎) | Yuichiro Yano | Miwa Satojima | March 23, 2002 |
The wind dies down and Morilire tells Barsac it is dangerous if they keep going and enter quicksand if there is no wind, they have to stop until the wind comes. After a while the wind still have not come, the crew in meantime do repairs as soon they will enter an area of rocks and quicksand. At night, Morilire, great spy that he is, sends a message to who knows what through light signals. The following day, the wind picks up and they begin to continue, they enter the rocky area, they manage to get across the area without too much trouble and they enter the quicksand. They have to increase the speed faster so they can go across the sandslide, while fixing a gear Jane sees something as they pass across a huge rock atop. Morilire is relieved that none of the crew saw it, but Jane did. They stop there for a while, Jane begins to climb up to see it, Jane guides Barsac and a few of the crewmembers including Morilire to it, what they see is a shipwreck, everyone wonders how that ship got all the way up here and where it comes from. They see on the ship as it says "Rai-jin" and how it even functioned with no oars, sails and propeller, Jane and two others go in to investigate. Jane by herself goes to a room and finds a huge pile of cerulean sand which immediately reminds her of the one she got in the letter from George, Barsac and the others come to investigate as well and seeing the cerulean sand, the fact the ship is on a mountain means the ship flew. Barsac asks Jane if she knows something about this sand and she answers no to him, Jane wonders if George was the one who built this flying ship. They leave the ship and continues with the journey, Barsac thinks about the time he watched George spoke of the Floating Liquid, Marcenay informs him they have secured the cerulean sand they gathered, Jane looks at her cerulean sand she kept in her brooch and Jane is convinced that George is still alive.
| 12 | "The Mechanical Bandit Band – Prologue"; Transliteration: "Kikai tōzoku-dan 〜 zenpen" (Japanese: 機械盗賊団〜前編) | Yuichiro Yano | Kōichi Mashima | March 30, 2002 |
At night, a group of people appears to a village, they are the bandits who rides in extremely fast one-man vehicles that allows them swift and unstoppable movement. The village chief Camille, leads the fight to try and stop the bandits, they fail and the bandits leave after stealing stuff, setting the village on fire, and seriously bruising Camille. The bandits benefit from technological advantage, Camille declares they won't let the bandits pillage them like this again and they'll go to the bandits to fight them instead. Jane and her group, where the crew is wrestling with a rock to get the ship unstuck from another rock, Camille and her men sees the mechanical ship and thinks they are the bandits. They see from afar a group of people riding chamels and bearing swords, and they deduce that they are under attack, Saburi recognizes from afar the warriors as part of the Hanan tribe and tells Jane that they are usually a peaceful people that never attack first, Jane feels that something is up, steals the rescue boat and stops the conflict. A discussion is open and Camille explains that she mistook them as the men from a place called Neo City, they attack the village on mechanical vehicles that moves fast and plunder everything in sight and kidnap the people. They realize they are talking about the mysterious band of bandits and asks what is Neo City, Camille says it is their city and according to rumors it lies farther east, but no one has ever been there before. Barsac asks why do they kidnap people, Camille do not know but she knows they rob people of their provisions and their families, and they kill anyone if they resist, many villages were attacked. Together with their leader, the Hanan tribe continued to fight and defend the town, but the leader who was Camille's father died in battle. Marcenay, moved by her tragic story, convinces Barsac to help the tribe, which they do. They finally manage to unstuck the ship and head for the village, Barsac asks Camille how did this village make money, she says with trade and became rich as the link between the eastern and western parts of this desert, that wealth made them a target for the bandits. Jane asks about the girl Sasha and Camille says she work for her, her parents were also taken to Neo City. They devise a plan to defend the village and how to use firearms and teach the villagers some hand to hand combat, Morilire is not happy with that. Jane bemoans how machines are used as weapons, saying machines are supposed to fulfill their dreams and happiness to everyone for everyone, and wishes George were here to tell her what to do.
| 13 | "The Mechanical Bandit Band – Epilogue"; Transliteration: "Kikai tōzoku-dan 〜 kōhen" (Japanese: 機械盗賊団〜後編) | Yuichiro Yano | Kōichi Mashima | April 6, 2002 |
As they continue to prepare for the fight, Camille informs the men of their plan, Barsac asks about moving the villagers to the sandship, but they refuse to do that due to their understandable hatred for machines, Jane still thinks about what Camille said about the dangers with machines as that there are corrupted people who obtained it, Jane is asked by Barsac to come with them. Jane learns that the bandits don't attack during daytime, Camille tells her the bandits only attack only on the night of the full moon, Jane wonders if there is some reason for that. At full moon night Morilire sabotages one of the nets, the bandits arrive in a flying machine and they land on the hills behind them. Camille makes the bandits go after her, everyone is shocked that the bandit's vehicles are actually flying when they fall from the hills, the bandits are unprepared that the villages use rifles against them. They use the sandship's cannons on them, Morilire use a dynamite to destroy the gate, Camille takes a fight against one of the bandits and she shoot an arrow on his vehicle and crashes. Morilire approaches the bandit about having failed and tells him to turn back, Morilire shows him something that he is one of them and tells him use him as shield and leave this village. The bandits then retreat and Camille with Marcenay goes after them, but a smoke comes over them and the bandits have escaped in the flying machine which no one saw. Camille thanks them for their help and their teachings, Barsac tells her they are going to find Neo City and rescue the villages. Jane tells Camille that machines become good or evil depending on the person who uses them, Camille understands what Jane mean but they don't trust machines just yet, Sasha gives Saburi her charm her father gave her, they then leave the village.
| 14 | "Morilire's True Character"; Transliteration: "Moririre no shōtai" (Japanese: モリリレの正体) | Yuichiro Yano | Miwa Satojima | April 13, 2002 |
The sandship finally arrives at the end of the desert to a jungle area, they now have to walk from here on. Jane and Barsac's groups prepare to get to Tarlmel as it will be a journey on foot with Morilire guiding them, they bid goodbye to the crew of the sandship. They walk through the jungle for a while and they take a break, Barsac learns from Jane that a trunk fell from the sky to them, but the sun was so bright and she wasn't able to see anything clearly, Barsac realize Jane is hiding something. As they continue Saburi marks the path in case of getting lost, Saburi begins to notice something strange that they have walk this path before. At night Jane realize that Barsac has another goal besides the bandit band and Saburi saying there is something with Morilire. A shadowy figure set the horses loose, but Sky attempts to attack the figure and everyone wakes up, they now have only two horses and Morilire says Sky did this, Jane finds a piece of cloth from Sky. In the morning Morilire suggests to turn back while trying to find the nearest town, Sky barks when seeing Morilire and Jane notice something on his pants. They arrive at two paths and Morilire says the lower path, Saburi says they will end up at a river as he smells it but they don't listen to him and they do end up there, as they cross the river Morilire cuts up the baggage gat gets swept away. At night Saburi tells Jane that Morilire is suspicious and wants to make him talk, Jane says they have to think of a strategy, they catch him in the act and is exposed to everyone as the real culprit. Morilire's beard disguise falls off and Jane recognize him as the same man who tried to take Barsac's baggage at the port back in England, this surprises Barsac and asks him if this is true but Morilire tries to lie, Barsac asks why was he here tonight, Morilire accidentally says to watch the horses not getting stolen when he said Sky did this earlier, Jane have evidence that the cloth is from his pants when he fought Sky while setting the horses loose. Marcenay is enraged that Morilire have deceived them this whole time, and asks him why and for what. Morilire is strung up in a tree until he is ready to talk, Morilire takes out a device from his pants and sends a signal, a flying machine was nearby and he is picked up by the people in it, in the morning everyone is shocked that Morilire have somehow escaped.
| 15 | "Each Other's Secrets"; Transliteration: "O-tagai no himitsu" (Japanese: おたがいの秘密) | Yuichiro Yano | Yuka Yamada | April 20, 2002 |
They walk in the mountains and St. Berain almost fall of the cliff. The group then finds a horrifying discovery of dead people, it appears they were an exploration team from another country, this serves as a warning to them that if they get closer they end up like them. As they bury the bodies Marcenay notice the soldier Jack is gone and they then find Jack going somewhere. Jack is confronted for desertion and Marcenay asks him why, Marcenay prepares to executed him and Jane stops him, Jack in tears says he was scared and doesn't want end up like the previous team, he doesn't want to die and he wants to go home to see his family. They are soon met and seeing a flying machine over them, the flying machine drops bombs and they all retreat into the cave, Jane and Jack takes cover in a hole and Marcenay then runs to them, then a signal is given to the flying machine by Morilire, hoping this be enough to scare them and the flying machine leaves. In the cave Jack and Marcenay make amends with each other, Jane talks to Barsac by this recent event that the flying machine was not she dreamed about and not that machine for killing people. Barasac shows Jane a knife that is useful tool, but if used impropely it harm people, it's not the fault of the tool as it the depends on whether the person who uses it is good or evil. Barsac tells Jane the true purpose of his expedition is to find and discover the Floating Liquid that will allow them to fly, also saying saying about the scholar who told about the Floating Liquid and traveled to the east to find it. Telling her his name was George Buxton which shocks her, he did receive the word that George was dead but perhaps he is still alive and he may have discovered it. Barsac says he want to return with the Floating Liquid as a useful tool and not for killing people, he told her this important secret as they are friends and doesn't want to lie. Jane decide to tell them that George is her elder brother and her real name is Jane Buxton, they all know that George was a member of the first exploration team that said to have caused rebellion and was executed at Tarmel, what she is saying it is not to be true and brings out the letter that she received few years after she received the news that her brother was executed, the last letter "n" on Buxton resemble his signature. This is not forged as Jane brings the cerulean sand she kept in her brooch to everyone, there was nothing inside the letter and all that came with it was a cerulean stone, this was indeed the Floating Liquid. Her brother George isn't the kind of person who would build a killing machine and he is a very kind person, Jane then cries over the situation and Barsac says he understand.
| 16 | "George Rests Here"; Transliteration: "Jōji koko ni nemuru" (Japanese: ジョージ ここに眠る) | Yuichiro Yano | Kōichi Mashima | April 27, 2002 |
In the morning as they prepare for departure, Barsac tells Jane the town of Tarlmel is close by passing a mountain, but tells Jane since she is in her search of her brother they have to say goodbye here. Jane asks why, he tells her he told her the purpose of their journey is to get hold of the Floating Liquid before anyone else does, but it seems that they were too late, that's why he must hunt down the people controlling that flying machine and fight them, saying she should know by now how dangerous that is and as long as she is with them there will always be danger from this point on. Barsac says to Jane that if her brother George has something to do with that flying machine and they both are thinking the same, but he may be dead aldready and that's something they just don't know and they must verify the facts. Barsac tells Jane to go to Tarlmel and whether George was really buried or not, and see it for herself. As they walk they are watched by Morilire, Barsac tells Jane to wait for them in Tarlmel and bids them goodbye, Morilire sees that they are planning on going to Tarlmel as he was told by his master, a flashback shows that Morilire is told by his mysterious master to not let Jane go near the grave. Jane and her group walk a long journey over the mountain and they camp for the night, Morilire reach Tarlmel in a flying machine and orders a group of men to drive them out of the town. Jane and her group finally arrive in Tarlmel and as they try to find the cemetery, St. Berain gets kidnapped by the men and they tell them to get out of the town on the first outbound caravan tomorrow morning, they return him once they do and if not they kill him. Jane and Saburi have no idea why they want to chase them out, but Jane gets the feeling it is because of her. In the morning Jane and Saburi leave for the caravan, but they have used a fake dummy and paid a kid to trick the men, Jane and Saburi searches for St. Berain and they find where St. Berain is being kept, they free him and they manage to get away from them. They go to the graveyard and Jane finds George's tombstone, Morilire is informed of what happened and orders to go to the place, they dig up the grave and the coffin is opened, Jane sees the coffin is empty and the only thing in there is George's model plane with a card that says "George Buxton rests here" with his own signature style, Jane is happy to know her brother George is really alive, they are suddenly confronted by Morilire in a flying machine and orders them to be captured.
| 17 | "My First Flight"; Transliteration: "Hajimete no sora" (Japanese: はじめての空) | Yuichiro Yano | Yuka Yamada | May 4, 2002 |
They try to get away from the flying machine but then they are captured, they are brought inside and sees the giant stone in the tank, Jane see it is the Floating Liquid which Morilire confirms. The sunset almost arrives and they close the sky off on the stone, the flying machine shakes and the lamps are turned on the stone, Jane hears a henchman saying of not wanting to end up like "Rai-jin", the same ship on the top of the mountain which is actually a flying machine. They are locked in a room, they see in the window they are flying in the sky, Saburi asks Jane why she is calm about this as they are being held prisoners and they can't escape while they are in the sky, Jane is happy about this experience. They are given fancy food, Morilire wonders why they are being treated this way. Jane tells them she thinks George is somewhere on this ship, the henchmen brings them next food they get the keys and locks the henchmen to go searching. Barsac and the soldiers continue their journey, Barsac wonders if Jane is all right, Neo City is somewhere in this eastern region and if they go there they know more about the mystery of the Flaoting Liquid. Morilire discover of their escape, Jane says George is the only person who can make a flying machine like this, but they are soon caught. They are brought back to the room, Morilire tells them if it weren't for his lord's orders he would have thrown them out a long time ago, he doesn't know why but he was ordered to bring them unharmed. Saburi asks where are he taking them, Morilire answers to Neo City, it is the most marvelous city on earth, built by the great lord Harry Killer, they arrive at Neo City tomorrow morning, Jane asks him who build this machine and he answers it is Harry Killer. At night, Barsac and the soldiers find the enemy's advance base, Jane wonders who Harry Killer is and it can't be George being behind this, but who really did built this flying machine. In the morning they brought outside, they see a forest with a stone mountain and they fly up the mountain. It is Neo City, a futuristic-like place, in a castle-like tower a masked man welcomes Jane.
| 18 | "Neo City"; Transliteration: "Neo shiti" (Japanese: ネオシティ) | Yuichiro Yano | Yuka Yamada | May 11, 2002 |
As they begin to land, Jane spot someone on top of castle tower and wonder it is George. They go out as they walk, all around this area is desert yet it is so green here, they go inside the castle tower and takes the elevator up, then a platform that goes up by stepping the foot and they reach the top. They are in a throne room and met by Harry Killer, the ruler of Neo City, Jane looks at him and see he is not her brother George. Harry have the guards take the others away to be separated away from Jane, Harry reassures them he wants to talk with her. Harry and Jane goes outside, Harry asks her if this is the magnificent and the most beautiful place on earth, but Jane remains unimpressed. Jane meets Jeanne, a girl around her age, who takes her on a small flying device to fly around Neo City. Jane asks Jeanne what sort of place is Neo City, Jeanne says it is the best country in the world and everyone here lives happily, but Jane says she has seen countless people suffer because of Neo City, Jeanne has no idea what she is talking about and says it is impossible. They fly to the streets and Jane sees the citizens live nice lives, then they land on a place where Harry awaits them, Jane asks Harry where the others are, Harry claims they are being entertained but Jane is skeptical, the others are in an underground dungeon. Jane is shown in a museum of old and new flying machines, Jeanne turns on machine that creates light and tells Jane to go inside it, Jane is told to close her eyes and imagine the face of someone she want to see, Jane closes her eyes and a switch is turned on, Jane opens her eyes and sees George and her stepbrother William, but they are just illusion of her thoughts being projected. Jeanne asks Jane why is she crying and Jane says she had two older brothers, the oldest went on a journey and became missing and her second brother went away, Jane expresses her love for them which Harry reacts. They show Jane machines that creates rain over Neo City, this amazes Jane and she is impressed, the others hears something below them and looks out in the small hole, they horrified discover that the kidnapped people are enslaved to work in a factory. They return to the castle tower, Jane asks Harry why did this place build here, Harry says it had to be here. Harry says about the Floating Liquid and the story of finding it, Harry says he wanted to make the people's lives happy, Jane remembers the bad things Neo City has done and asks Harry of why attacking other towns and hurting people in other lands, Harry appears surprised about that and wonders of this happened, Harry tells Jane that someone has been running amok behind his back, Harry tells Jane he must go now and he has a room prepared for her. Jane is given a luxurious room (with a guard outside the door), Jane asks Jeanne if Harry did make all those discoveries, Jeanne answers it was Professor Camaret, Jane aks if she meet Professor Camaret but Jeanne says only Harry can see him. Harry by himself wishes Jane to stay in this world forever, the others try to figure out how to somehow rescue Jane, Saburi puts St. Berain's necktie on Sky and goes to find Jane. Harry is informed that the advance base has been captured by Barsac's forces, Harry orders to send Morilire at once, Harry in anger says death to all those who threaten his world.
| 19 | "Professor Camaret"; Transliteration: "Kamare hakase" (Japanese: カマレ博士) | Yuichiro Yano | Kōichi Mashima | May 18, 2002 |
Morilire and the flying machine goes to the base to destroy Barsac, Jane hears Sky in the vent and use the bookshelf to get up, seeing the St. Berain's necktie makes Jane see something must have happened to them and Jane follows Sky in the vent. In the advance base, Barsac interrogates the leader of the base and the location of Neo City, a soldier warnes them a flying machine has come and Barsac orders to retreat from the base, Morilire orders to drop the bombs on the base. A guard bringing breakfast discover Jane's escape, Jane continues to climb down the castle tower, Harry orders to search for Jane and not to harm her, Jeanne is informed by Harry of Jane's disappearance. Jane looks out to place that is a landing bay for the flying machines and a flying machine then lands, the citizens then appears who are aware and supports kidnapping people into slavery, the stolen treasures are given to them; revealing themselves as greedy maniacs. Jane is discovered and quickly flees, Jane arrives in the factory and discover the slavery, Saburi warns Jane and Jane runs away from the henchmen, Jane manages to get away from the henchmen. Morilire and the henchmen go to investigate the destroyed base for survivors, but they are cornered by Barsac and the soldiers. Jane goes to another vent and she is outside, Jane runs in the streets and stops in a moving walkway, but her location is discovered, Jane sits down to take a break, Jane remembers what Jeanne and Harry told her about Neo City and flying machines thanks to the Floating Liquid. The henchmen then appears after her and Jane runs into a tower, Jane barely manages to get inside the elevator and puts the elevatory up but Sky is separated from her and the henchmen use the stairs, Jane looks at the castle tower as she goes up. Jane arrives at the top of the tower, Jane discover a room for research and sees a man, Jane goes to him and the man turns around who is George, they hug in reunion and George asks her why is she here, but the henchmen arrives to them and it is revealed that George is Professor Camaret, they tell George that Jane is a fugitive and to hand her over, George is informed it is Harry's orders, George reassures Jane before she goes with them. Barsac finally understands from Morilire of why he was sabotaging their efforts, Marcenay tells Morlilire he will be executed, Morilire tells them that Jane is in Neo City and he is spared, Barsac says they are heading for Neo City. Sky returns to St. Berain and Saburi, Harry is shocked that Jane did meet Professor Camaret, Harry orders to increase the guards and don't ever let Jane out of her room ever again, Jeanne asks Harry of why doing this but Harry tells her to leave him alone, Barsac and the soldiers take the flying machine to Neo City.
| 20 | "The Escape"; Transliteration: "Tōbō" (Japanese: 逃亡) | Yuichiro Yano | Yuka Yamada | May 25, 2002 |
In the throne room George talks to Harry about treating Jane like an escaped prisoner, Harry says he is sorry and says he wanted to surprise him so he kept it secret. Harry tells George it is a most important time for both of them, George realize he is talking about something called "Genesis" and Harry says right now he wants him to put his all into its development. Harry says he can see Jane anytime but just until Genesis is completed, George asks him will his research really be of any use, Harry tells George that he is the one who said the Floating Liquid is the energy they dreamed of and that is why he worked with him, with the completion of Genesis the Floating Liquid will help to bring peace to mankind, wars all over the world will come to an end. George have doubts but does it anyways, as he leaves he tell him it is just that Jane suddenly showed up, the researcher Kera comes to Harry and Harry asks how are the "Prominence", Kera says the work on Prominence is proceeding as planned. In the research tower Kera returns to George, George is motivated to complete Genesis as soon as possible. Jane in her room is visited by Jeanne, she asks her why did she try to escape and says Harry has been acting strange when she ran away, Jane tells Jeanne of remembering what she said when they first met and Jeanne remembers, Jane says she wasn't lying and now have seen with her very own eyes there are people suffering right here in Neo City, telling Jeanne if she won't believe her go to the factory in the basement and she will see how everyone is suffering, but Jeanne acusses her of lying and storms out. Jeanne goes to Harry to tell her the truth and Harry understands that Jane have told her about this, Harry lies to her that Jane is insane and that before she came here she had a traumatic experience and now she is unable to understand to tell reality from fantasy, when he heard that he felt for her and that is why he brought her here, Jeanne is convinced by his lies and leaves, Harry in his thoughts tells Jane he her wanted to stay in this world forever. Jane don't understands of why George is so at ease about it, but it is clear he is being fooled, just like Jeanne, she must tell George what really is going on. But how can she escape as the vent is locked, suddenly an explosion occurs and the guards busy about this, this gives Jane chance and runs out. In the flying machine where Barsac and the soldiers are, Barsac is informed that Morilire wants to talk to him, Morilire begs Barsac to let him work with him, says it is impossible for him to rescue Jane by themselves and it is not easy to sneak into the central areas of Neo City, but if he is with them they will let their guard down. Marcenay question him with all the things he put them through and how does he expect them to believe him, Morilire claims he didn't do all of this because he wanted to and it was all on Harry's orders, and if he didn't do it he would have been killed, he says his eyes have been opened and don't want continue with Neo City's horrible actions, Barsac understands but tells him if he betrays them once more he pays for it, they arrived in Neo City. Jane takes the elevator to the underground, the flying machine lands and Morilire and Barsac's group in the hencmen clothes goes out, but Morilire have tricked them and they are captured, Jane sees Barsac and the soldiers and goes after them. Saburi and St. Berain have been working a way of escape, Barsac and Marcenay arrives to them, Morilire informs Harry they have captured Barsac, Barsac and Marcnay are in the underground cells and transferred the soldiers to the factory, Morilire has heard that Jane has escaped again and he will find her. After he leaves, Harry's anger grows, Barsac is informed St. Berain that George is alive as the grave at Tarlmel was empty, they have find a way to get out of the cells, they hear Jane being caught and Saburi continue to finish digging a tunnel out the cell, Saburi and Sky saves Jane and the henchmen are knocked out. They take the keys to open the cells, Jane informes them George is here and they proceed to escape to find a flying machine, Morilire soon discover their escape and calls out to all the henchmen in Neo City, the group take a vehicle to drive it. Jeanne goes to Harry and asks if it is true that Jane's missing again, a henchmen tells Harry that Barsac and his group are headed for the flight terminal, Harry tells Jeanne not to worry but when she speaks back he shouts at her, Jeanne is scared by this and Harry leaves to go to the group.
| 21 | "The Secret of the Floating Liquid"; Transliteration: "Fuyūsen no nazo" (Japanese: 浮遊泉の謎) | Yuichiro Yano | Kōichi Mashima | June 1, 2002 |
They continue to drive the vehicle and they reach the flight terminal, they find a small flying machine, Barsac and Marcenay hold the henchmen off while Jane and her group go to the flying machine. Jane starts the flying machine but it is stuck to the ground by a wire and St. Berain gets off to remove it, as they try to grab St. Berain they are met by Harry in a tank, Harry orders to fire the cannon on them but he sees Jane is there and tries to stop it, but the cannon is fired but barely misses them. Jane has lost the controls and flies out, Barsac and Marcenay are stopped by Harry who holds St. Berain, the flying machine goes outside and Jeanne sees Jane in there, they fly to the tower where George is and he sees Jane, he goes to the roof to help her but unable to and they fly out of Neo city. Jeanne goes to save Jane but she sees Harry and the others, Harry is about to execute Barsac but he is informed that George wants to see him right away, he wishes to speak with him about Jane, Harry spares Barsac due to this and orders Morilire to track down the flying machine and bring Jane back at once which Morilire asks him of why being so possessive of her, Jane's group eventually lands and crashes. George asks Harry of what is going on, the flying machine that jane was riding in was burning and what was Jane doing in it in the first place, he asks where Jane is and Harry tells him there was a slight problem and it's been taken care of, Harry lies that a message from Morilire just now says he has confirmed that Jane is safe, once Jane returns he will send her to him and George is convinced. Jane says they have repair the flying machine and go back, Saburi says they just escaped and why are they going back, Jane says they have to rescue them and everyone else, she have tell George the truth about Neo city and she is sure he will do something about it, Jane tells Saburi that Neo City was all created by her brother and he is being tricked by Harry. George tells Harry he is moving the research Genesis forward at full speed, but the absorption rate of the energy is taking more time than they thought, Genesis is the energy derived when the Floating Liquid is split at an atomic level, this energy is obtained by hitting the Floating Liquid with electric waves of a specific frequency, but this is will be a power they have never handled before, a terribel power. Jeanne wonders who were those people she saw and what is Harry up to, Jeanne thinks about the underground factory Jane told her about. Jane is going to build a flying machine by using the working parts, Jane takes out a small tank of cerulean stone and they carry the tank out, the sunlight shines upon it and the cerulean stone turns red, they get away from before it explodes. George tells Harry that the problem is how to extract this energy safely and how they would convert this extracted energy into power, Harry tells him to finish Genesis as soon as possible, once Genesis is completed the energy situation of the world will change completely, George leaves and Kera informs Harry of the progression of Prominence. Jane finally realize of not noticing it before about the Floating Liquid, she tells Saburi of why did the flying machines appear only at night and why were the crew so scared of flying during the day, because if the Floating Liquid is exposed to sunlight it explodes, only the moonlight is its friend (it was moonlight on the day Jane received the letter), they have one more left of cerulean stone tank. In the underground cells Marcenay and Barsac talk of what they should do now, St. Berain is thinking about something and Barsac asks him of what is it, St. Berain says it is just that he have this feeling that he has met this Harry Killer before, but he can't remember, in the vent Jeanne goes to see for herself whether Jane was telling the truth or not. Jane has finished her flying machine and now they just have to wait for the sky to clear for the moon, Jeanne sees a light and finally sees the truth.
| 22 | "The Infiltration"; Transliteration: "Shinnyū" (Japanese: 侵入) | Yuichiro Yano | Yuka Yamada | June 8, 2002 |
In the flying machine Morilire and the henchmen continue to find Jane, Jane and Saburi hide from them. Harry receives a message from Morilire that they have been unable to find Jane and they are temporarily returning to Neo City, Harry says no and tells the henchman to tell Morilire not to come back until he finds Jane. Jane and her group get on her flying machine and they proceed to fly to Neo City to see George, Jeanne is distraught over what Jane told her was the truth and wonders where she is now, Jane tries to make her flying machine go up the walls but the tank is too small for the Floating Liquid, the dawn is almost up. A flying machine shows up and they hide, they see the flying machine goes to a cave, but the sunlight shows up and the tank turns red, Jane goes down but the flying effect is off and they crash in the forest below. They see that the henchmen in the cave have brought the slaves to switch other slaves, they decide to hide amongst those people and goes to the suits, a man and a woman notice the bracelet on Saburi and they try to ask him where did he get that bracelet, Saburi says it was a gift. They go in inside the tunnel and they see the Floating Liquid on top, they are in the mines where the slaves mine the cerulean stones, Morilire discover something on the ground, George and Kera continue with their work, George wonders how Jane is doing. Morilire and the henchmen find the flying machine and they see it's been taken apart, Morilire sees that the tank of the Floating Liquid is gone and says they are returning back, Morilire says that Jane is already back at Neo City. Jane and her group sneak on the conveyor but a henchman notice them and puts on the alarm, they see a tunnel they get up to and they climb upwards, Harry talks to Morilire he ordered him not to go back until he found Jane, Morilire tells him Jane has returned to Neo City and he will find her in no time. In the ventilation shaft they find the path is divided in two, Saburi and Sky go to find the others and Jane goes to find George, the streets the henchmen search for Jane, Jane comes up only to be found and runs away. Jeanne sees her and uses a small flying device to grab her Jane sees that Jeanne has seen the underground factory and Jeanne is tearfully devastated for believing Harry. Jane tells Jeanne she has to see Professor Camaret and she takes her to him. George sees Jane in the window, and they meet at the roof, George and Jeanne meet for the first time and asks him if he made all those discoveries. George says they are not his alone as it was Harry's support made it all possible. Jane tells him that is wrong as Harry is lying to him, George does not get what she is saying and says Harry is helping him, but Jane says he is being used and to believe what she is saying. George tells her this city was created through the cooperation between Harry and him, and he is not being used. Jane tells him there are many people being forced to work in the underground factory, but he says there is no such factory in Neo City. Jeanne tells Jane he won't believe her until he sees with his own eyes, and they take him to see it. As they go, the henchmen discover George's absence. George is shocked by the factory and sees the cruel slavery. Jane tells him there's something else he has to see – he sees the arrival of people who were kidnapped and the stolen treasures given to the citizens. Seeing all the labor being done by the slaves, George can't believe how this could have happened and what he has done. Saburi and Sky in the ventilation shaft sees Jane. George painfully asks what he has been doing, he thought he was creating a utopia – a city where everyone could live in peace – but instead the suffering of these people was what made it possible. What he created is the devil's own country. But Jane tells George it's not too late; he can start over. He asks her how as what he's done can't be undone. Jane tells him it is not true, and he is the only one who can save those people. It's because he created Neo City. If anyone can figure out how to save those people, he could. George realizes that is right as he did create this and the one to do it can only be him; but they are found and cornered by Morilire and the henchmen.
| 23 | "The Truth"; Transliteration: "Shinjitsu" (Japanese: 真実) | Yuichiro Yano | Miwa Satojima | June 15, 2002 |
They are brought to Harry in the throne room, George confronts him of what's the meaning of this and how can he treat those people that way, Harry says what about it and tells him to focus on the development of Genesis and don't even think about anything else. But George says he cannot work with him anymore and demands him to free the people underground immediately, Harry grabs Jane and says this is a paradise he created with his own hands and he will not be ordered around by anyone, Harry tells him to complete Genesis. But it is revealed by George that Harry is actually William which surprises Jane and he takes his disguise off, William tells them they are all fools and he will never forgive the Buxton family, he begins to tell that day the first Eastern Expeditionary Force set out he secretly boarded the same ship George was on. Following George and the team through the desert, William met Morilire who became his first henchman and his right-hand man, they are going to get ahead of them. In a desert town William buys every horse and caravan of the place, this hinders George and the team to continue their journey, William meets with George and lies why he is here, William says they should travel together as he has caravan and use manipulation on George to convince him. George is happy that William wants to help him, they and the team travel many days and haven't found the Floating Liquid yet, looking at map George says according to his conjecture an area have to be the place, after a long journey they reach the area. They search through the area until George sees a blue light in a cave, inside the cave George and team finds cerulean stones and water that flies up, they have finally found the Floating Liquid. Morilire informs William they plan to blow up to open up the entrance and collect the Floating Liquid, at night William and Morilire begin their plan as Morilire goes to the entrance with something, William pours water in their glasses and he tries to put something in a glass to George, George says there is some connection between a cerulean stone and the Floating Liguid. Morilire have brought more dynamites to the entrance, George puts the stone in the glass while looking at the moon and then the Floating Liquid comes out, George realize exposed to water creates and goes to study more about it, William gives George the glass with the stuff in it and he drinks it, George finds out that the stones should not be exposed to sunlight and he fall asleep by the stuff. In the morning William tells the team to go ahead with the blasting without George, George wakes up and goes to warn them that stone are dangerous when exposed to sunlight, but due to the extra dynamites the team are killed in the blasting, the sun shines on the stones that turns red and creates a deadly explosion. George believes this is his fault for their deaths, William then manipulates him over this situation and George thinks must atone it with his life, but William tells to not make their deaths meaningless but George says he can never go home home again, William says everyone died dreaming of a bright future where flying machines were real, saying they shall build a city of the future here and where flying machines are real, letting the dreams of the people who died become real by creating an utopian city here. William says someday they call Mr. Buxton and Jane here, William and George work together for the city, William says to forget their names and go by new ones. Back to the present, George is angry at William that everything was according to his plan, William says the Floating Liquid which hundreds and thousands of people have dreamed of he never thought it would fall into his hands so easily. Jane can't believe William did all of this and she gets off him, William tells her she don't have to be scared, he is not going to do anything to her and they are going to rule the world together, with completion the development of Genesis and he will hold the world in his hands. George believes once Kera finds out about this he won't cooperate with him either, Kera shows up and George is told by William that Kera is his loyal servant, saying he will make the changes to Genesis following Kera's directions and they are going to make it into the ultimate weapon, William puts Jane in a cell in meantime to make sure George is doing as told.
| 24 | "The Collapse of an Empire"; Transliteration: "Teikoku no hōkai" (Japanese: 帝国の崩壊) | Yuichiro Yano | Kōichi Mashima | June 15, 2002 |
Saburi follows Sky to the prison cells, the now abandoned Jeanne is asked by Barsac of why she is in this place with them. Saburi and Sky arrives to them and Saburi informs that Jane's been captured, Jeanne don't have the slightest idea of where Jane is, Saburi knocks out the henchmen and uses the keys to open the cells, Barsac opens the door for Jeanne and tells her to come with them. Hidden in place the others learn from Jeanne that George is Professor Camaret, Jeanne says he was being deceived by Harry and she was just a substitute for Jane, Harry treated her like hos own sister but his real sister is Jane and he is Jane's brother, this shocks St. Berain that he is William and that the young boy grew up to such a person. They have to rescue them quickly and get out of here, Saburi and Jeanne goes to the research tower to find George with the message from Barsac that they need the help of the workers underground and to start an insurrection together, Morilire discover their escape and orders the henchmen to find them. Saburi and Jeanne reach the laboratory, Kera leaves the room and George is met by them, Saburi tells him the plan of rescuing all the people who were kidnapped and they are going to start an insurrection, they need his help to do it, George has an idea and instructs them what they are going to do. George pulls the levers to the rain machine, Saburi and Jeanne are soon found by the henchmen but they manage to get away from them and they land where the kidnapped people are being held, Saburi is reunited with Jack and the soldiers, they hide Saburi and Jeanne from the henchmen who came to check the room, the man asks Saburi what he said to him earlier about the bracelet and Saburi says a girl named Sasha gave it to him, the man and the woman are Sasha's parents. Saburi tells them they came to help them escape and he tells them about George's plan, George tells Kera to inform William that to Genesis's demonstration that he bring Jane, Saburi and Jeanne returns to the others and tells them when they see a large firework that's the signal for them to blow up the mine, there's supposed to be a lot of dynamite at the mine, Barsac and Marcenay knocks out the henchmen and informs the other slaves of the plan and they are all going to escape this city. William shows up with Jane and George begins to show the power of Genesis, the weather makes the water overflow the city, Genesis it to contain and control the sunlight's effects that creates a beam that shoots at a mountain, the rain comes to them and William asks George of what is going on, then an explosion occurs and William asks George what did he do, George says this demonic empire that he created he will destroy it with his own hands. The water comes in to the mine and moonlight shines in, the Floating Liquid all over the place goes up and it makes the ceiling go down, the others comes in a small flying device to rescue Jane but Kera shoots at it and they crash down below, William takes Genesis and Jane and George have to come with him, all the slaves and the soldiers start the insurrection in the factory and Morilire gets away. William, Jane, George and Kera run as the city slowly start to come down, they arrive in a room where they see a gigantic flying machine and William says this is Prominence. Jane begs William to please stop before he do any more, she tells him they all love him and they all go home to Glenor Castle, telling him since he went away Mr. Buxton has gone downhill and if all three of them come home she is sure he will recover, but William reveals to Jane his hatred for him and he is now crazy, William tells them that the three of them will rule the world.
| 25 | "The Flying Machine, Prominence"; Transliteration: "Hikō kikai purominensu" (Japanese: 飛行機械プロミネンス) | Yuichiro Yano | Kōichi Mashima | June 29, 2002 |
William along with Jane and George board Prominence and prepares for lifting off, the others sees the gigantic flying machine and Barsac and Marcenay lead the freed slaves, Saburi says Jane is on that thing and they go to rescue her while Jeanne guide the people to a safe place. William says he have Genesis and as long he have it the world is his, the citizens and remaining henchmen proceed to evacuate and the others find a small flying machine and takes off to Prominence, they land under it. As the citizens and the rest of the henchmen goes after them, William is fed up with them and decide to test Prominence's power with Genesis, Prominence turns around and William fires at them, giant beam hits at one flying machine and shock waves destroys the flying machines, the beam hits Neo City and creates a giant explosion, the others sneak inside and are soon discovered, William sends Morilire and the hencmen to the group. Saburi, Marcenay and Sky goes to rescue them while Basrac and St. Berain hold them off, William puts Genesis on a gun and the others arrive, they all escape with Genesis them. They go to help Barsac and St. Berain from the hencmen who gets knocked out, George and Barsac are reunited, there are some flying devices to escape but George tells them they have to go without him because this flying machine cannot be left in the hands of these people, but the enemy is everywhere and he can't do it all by himself, they all together go with him. They go to the giant cerulean stone tank and George turns off the lamps and empty the tank out of the flying machine, they are cornered by the hencmen and William, George says it is too late as the flying machine is going to fall and the same as their fate, but William is not what they said and has the hencmen begin to kill them. Jane out of desperation points Genesis at them and warns if they come closer she shoots, but William sees Morilire sneaks up to her and pretends he is hurt that Jane hates him which makes her lower her guard, Morilire grabs her and takes her to William, William takes Genesis and points to the others, he declares to George that he no longer any use to him and is about to pull the trigger. Jane bites Morilire and tries to stop William only for Genesis to be fired on the roof, the outside air begins to eject out the remaining henchmen including Morilire who gets betrayed by William to their doom, the flying machine slowly begin to explode and William runs as he won't give up. George decide to stay to stop William and Jane have to escape with the others, they get on the flying machine that brought them up, but Jane is last seconds jumps of from them, Jane can't abandon George and William and goes after them.
| 26 | "From Jane, With Love"; Transliteration: "Jēn yori ai o komete" (Japanese: ジェーンより愛を込めて) | Yuichiro Yano | Yuka Yamada | July 6, 2002 |
As Prominence goes down, Kera attempts to destroy parts as this is his flying machine he created but he is killed by the explosions, William is in an emergency room to separate it from the flying machine to save the last machinery that flies, but George manages to get to him. George tries to reason with William but he points Genesis at him, his insanity breaks through over his dreams and fires but Jane saves George. William says he finally has own world that worships only him, but Jane asks over he hurt so many people for something like that, he says she and the people of the Buxton family will never understand how he feels, he claims the Buxton family stole everything from him; his dear mother and his happiness, and that Jane left him without anyone, he tells Jane he want her to only look at him and if she don't he die of loneliness. Jane tells him she will always stay by his side, telling him they have go home at Glenor Castle, but William reacts to that place and is frustrated of why she won't only love him. Now completely insane, William puts Genseis on Prominence and wants to blow everything in pieces, he fires everything in sight, George and Jane tries to stop him. William tries to gain control of the flying machine but it continues blow up, he takes Genesis and goes to escape pod but is stopped by George and struggle for a bit, George takes Jane and puts her in the escape pod, he tells her this escape pod can only hold one person, but Jane wants they all escape together, George places her in and sends her out. But wires get tangled and Jane waggle around, seeing Jane in danger causes William to remember when Jane got stuck in a tree and he climbed up to save her, the memory when his mother died and the last words she gave him, the moment he loved Jane and his mother's words echoes to him, and that Jane still loved him despite the horrible things he has done, this makes William become sane again and begins to cut the wires to make sure Jane survives. George and William together cut the wires and Jane safely flies away, George and William have a final moment together before they perish in the explosions, Prominence crashes at Neo City and it creates a gigantic explosion, the Floating Liquid flies up one last time. Sometime later back in England, Barsac reports about their joruney, he tells them that George Buxton was not executed for starting a revolt and says (a white lie to protect George's honor and the fact that the Floating Liquid is now gone from the world) that he was killed by a band of bandits that was looting the Eastern Lands and George in an effort to follow his orders until the very end stood up to them, Barsac says they were unable to discover the Floating Liquid and it was something only to be found in legends, but he says would like to believe the words of George Buxton who said that people could fly and if they lose their dreams scientific progress is impossible, they have to turn it into a reality with their own hands. At Glenor Castle, Mr. Buxton begins to recover, Jane begins to test her latest flying machine, Jane says it has been a long time since that journey and Jeanne is now officially Barsac's adopted daughter, Marcenay stayed with Camille and they got married, Saburi is with the orphans and he now works with the crew of the sandship. As Jane drives her flying machine it flies up and she is happy to finally worked, the spirits of George and William congrats her and don't forget that they are always by her side, the spirits of Marguerite and Anna comes to them and they all vanish, in the last scene in the study room lies George's model plane.
