= 19th Seiyu Awards =

2025 voice acting award in Tokyo

- Awarded for: Voice acting in Japan
- Date: March 15, 2025
- Location: JOQR Media Plus Hall; Minato, Tokyo
- Country: Japan

Highlights
- Best Lead Actors: Miho Okasaki; Toshihiko Seki
- Best Supporting Actors: Hidenobu Kiuchi; Asami Seto; Hiroki Tōchi; Yoko Hikasa
- Website: www.seiyuawards.jp

The 19th Seiyu Awards was held on March 15, 2025, at the JOQR Media Plus Hall in Minato, Tokyo. The winners of the Merit Awards, the Kei Tomiyama Award, the Kazue Takahashi Award, the Synergy Award, the Kids/Family Award, the Game Award, and the Special Honor Award were announced on February 18, 2025. The rest of the winners were announced on the ceremony day.

Winners	Agency
Best Actors in a Leading Role
Miho Okasaki	I'm Enterprise
Toshihiko Seki	81 Produce
Best Actors in Supporting Roles
Hidenobu Kiuchi	Office Osawa
Asami Seto	StarCrew
Hiroki Tōchi	Office Osawa
Yoko Hikasa	i.nari
Best New Actors
Hiiro Ishibashi	Avex Pictures
Shotaro Uzawa	81 Produce
Hiroki Nanami	ANDSTIR
Rika Hayashi	Arts Vision
Asaki Yuikawa	I'm Enterprise
Singing Award
Winners	Record Label
Bravern (Voiced by Kenichi Suzumura)	Brave Bang Bravern!

Merit Award
Winners	Agency
Keiichi Noda	Aoni Production
Mari Okamoto	81 Produce
Kei Tomiyama Memorial Award
Winner	Agency
Sōichirō Hoshi	Arts Vision
Kazue Takahashi Memorial Award
Winner	Agency
Wakana Yamazaki	Aoni Production
Game Award
Winner
Like a Dragon: Infinite Wealth
Synergy Award
Winner
Mobile Suit Gundam SEED Freedom
Special Honor Award
Winner
Look Back
Kids/Family Award
Winner	Agency
Wataru Hatano	81 Produce
Foreign Movie/Series Award
Winner	Agency
Maaya Uchida	I'm Enterprise
Fairouz Ai	Raccoon Dogs
Influencer Award
Winner	Agency
Subaru Kimura	Atomic Monkey
Most Valuable Seiyū Award
Winner	Agency
Yūichi Nakamura	INTENTION
