= Telecom Animation Film =

Japanese animation studio

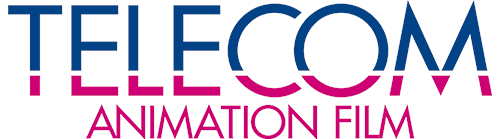
- Logo used since 2026

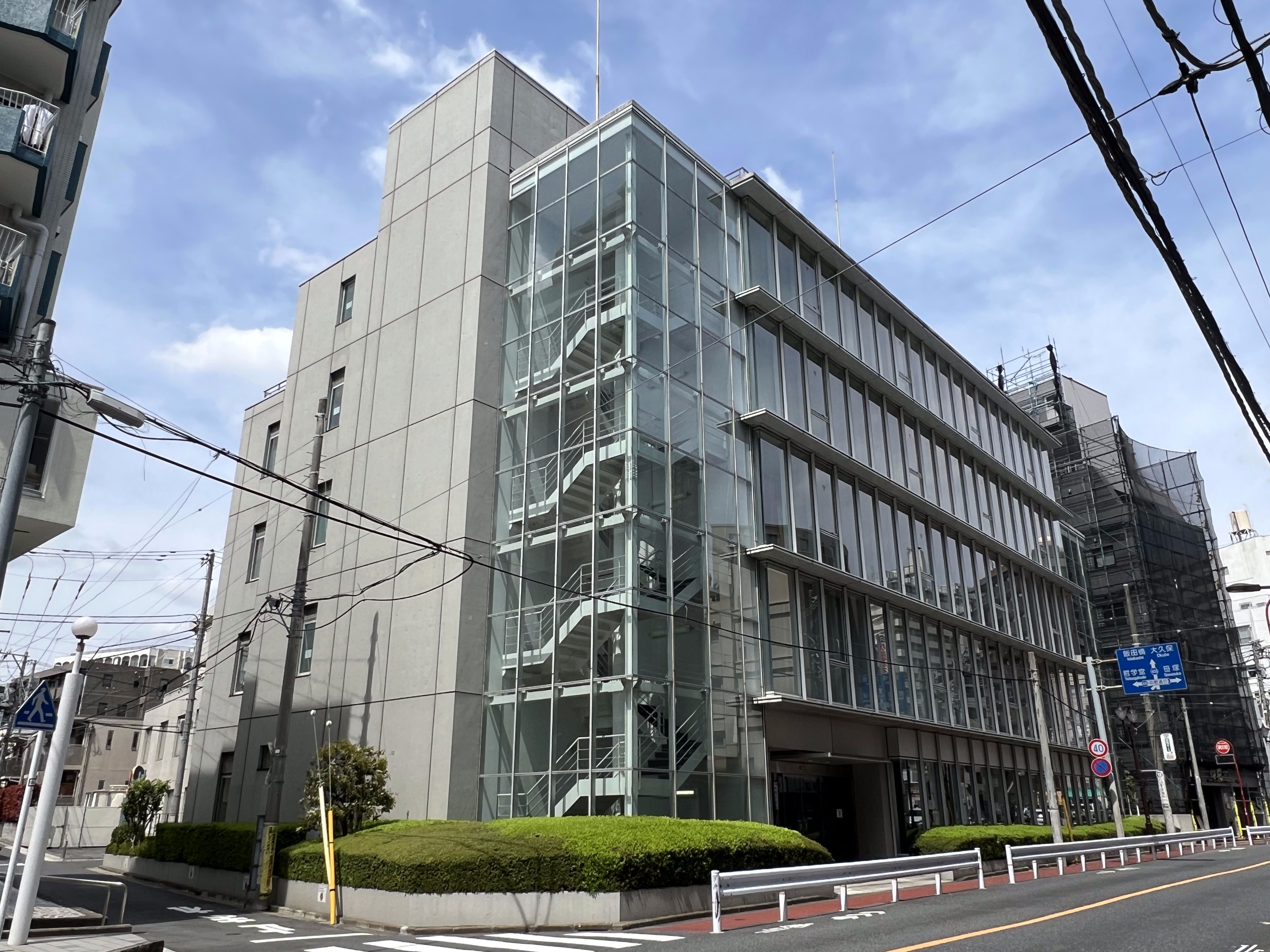
- Headquarters in Nakano, Tokyo
- Native name: テレコム・アニメーションフィルム
- Romanized name: Terekomu Animēshon Firumu
- Type: Division
- Industry: Anime
- Founded: May 19, 1975; 51 years ago
- Headquarters: Nakano, Nakano, Tokyo, Japan
- Products: Animated films; Animated television programs; OVA; ONA; Video games
- Parent: TMS Entertainment
- Divisions: Telecom Animation Film CGI Production Department
- Website: telecom-anime.com

Telecom Animation Film (テレコム・アニメーションフィルム, Terekomu Animēshon Firumu) is a Japanese animation studio founded on May 19, 1975. The studio is a division of TMS Entertainment and is located in the parent company's headquarters building.

Telecom Animation Film is a well-established studio known for its production cooperation on films produced by Tokyo Movie Shinsha, including the Japan-US co-production Little Nemo: Adventures in Slumberland, Hayao Miyazaki's Lupin III: The Castle of Cagliostro, and Isao Takahata's Jarinko Chie. It is known in the industry as a prestigious studio, and has had many famous creators on its roster in the past, including Hayao Miyazaki, Isao Takahata, Yasuo Ōtsuka, who was their former tutor and animation director on their works, Kazuhide Tomonaga, (Note: Tomonaga did not have a car license, so he drew the car while learning about it from Ōtsuka, the animation director, and Ōtsuka himself added the clutch operation movements.) who worked on the car chase scene in The Castle of Cagliostro, Nizo Yamamoto, art director at Studio Ghibli, and Yoshiyuki Sadamoto, character designer for Neon Genesis Evangelion.

The studio has in-house staff of keyframes, inbetweenings, background art, direction, and production assistants who manage these tasks, allowing the general flow of production to be done in-house. Unusually for an animation studio, Telecom has an in-house art department. It is particularly known for its background art, and is highly regarded in the industry for its high level of technical ability. Its appeal lies in its high drawing power and 3D layout precision.

It has participated in various productions in the form of production cooperation, and have been involved in the creation of background art for blockbuster films such as Hayao Miyazaki's The Castle of Cagliostro, Studio Ghibli films, Makoto Shinkai's Weathering With You, and Mamoru Hosoda's Belle. While participating in the production of Studio Ghibli's Princess Mononoke, the studio was consulted about the lack of time for coloring and suggested digital painting, which led to Ghibli's introduction of computer graphics.

== History ==
In 1975, Telecom Animation Film was established by Tokyo Movie Shinsha (TMS) to train animators who could draw full-animation. Yutaka Fujioka, the president of TMS at the time, dreamed of making a big breakthrough in the United States. So Fujioka decided to make a full-animation film that could compete with Disney, but in Japan, limited-animation adopted and developed by Osamu Tezuka was the mainstream. Therefore, he planned to establish a new studio, Telecom Animation Film, and use it as a base to produce a Japan-U.S. co-production of an animated film using full-animation.

In the summer of 1978, Fujioka acquired the rights to adapt the legendary American cartoon Little Nemo into a film. When Telecom advertised in a newspaper for staff, they received over 1,000 applications, and Fujioka hired 43 people with no animation experience. Rather than selecting animators with experience in limited-animation, Fujioka chose to select entirely inexperienced amateurs and train them into elite animators with full-animation skills. Sadao Tsukioka, who was said to be a genius, was invited as an instructor for the first year. He used a unique method of training the new recruits, such as eliminating the influence of the TV series, as he considered it unnecessary for making a feature film. In 1979, Yasuo Ōtsuka moved from Shin-Ei Animation and took over Tsukioka's position. (Note: Otsuka had been seconded from Shin-Ei Animation to Nippon Animation just prior to that, over the objections of the company, for Future Boy Conan, Hayao Miyazaki's directorial debut, but he transferred to Telecom instead of returning to the company after its completion.) Since there were few animators who could actually do the work, Ōtsuka transferred Nobuo Tomizawa from Nippon Animation, Atsuko Tanaka and Keiko Oyamada from Shin-Ei Animation, and Kazuhide Tomonaga, Tsukasa Tannai, and Shojiro Yamauchi from Oh! Production to Telecom. However, because of difficulties in securing production funds and organizing staff, production of the film never got off the ground, so Telecom decided to first work on another TV series and films under Ōtsuka. So Ōtsuka invited Hayao Miyazaki and Isao Takahata to join Telecom as directors, and they moved from Zuiyo. Miyazaki directed the second Lupin III film, The Castle of Cagliostro, and Takahata directed Jarinko Chie. Fujioka frequently held screenings of those two films for Hollywood film professionals in order to promote Telecom and the Japanese animation industry, which at the time was regarded in the U.S. as having low production capabilities. The films attracted a lot of attention, especially from young animators, including John Lasseter. The event also brought about an unexpected response, such as requests from countries outside the U.S. for TMS and Telecom to produce a TV series. TMS began production of the Italian-Japanese co-produced TV series Sherlock Hound in 1981, after receiving a request for a TV series from RAI, the Italian national public broadcaster. The series was actually animated by Telecom Animation Film, and directed by Hayao Miyazaki. However, the collaboration was dissolved after six episodes were produced, and the remaining 20 episodes were subsequently produced with funding from Japanese companies. (Note: The TV broadcasts was not in the order of production.) Kyosuke Mikuriya took over as director from Miyazaki, and with Telecom leaving to focus on the film Little Nemo, TMS outsourced the animation to Gallop, a fledgling studio. Telecom then took on the actual production of animation works for American production companies such as Disney, Warner Bros., and Filmation, which had been commissioned by TMS, and became proficient in the art of full animation in the 1980s.

In the spring of 1981, TMS established a local subsidiary in the U.S. and began full-scale efforts to produce the film Little Nemo: Adventures in Slumberland. On the Japanese side, Fujioka was appointed line producer, and on the U.S. side, Gary Kurtz was appointed film producer upon the recommendation of George Lucas.

Under producer Yutaka Fujioka's grand order to "produce a world-class animation film", creators from Japan and abroad were gathered, and many famous people such as Hayao Miyazaki, Isao Takahata, Osamu Dezaki, Yasuo Ōtsuka, Ray Bradbury, Jean Giraud (Moebius), and Chris Columbus were involved. However, various misunderstandings occurred between Japan and the US, and the production ran into difficulties. Miyazaki and Takahata, who were originally slated to direct the film, left the project, and the staff continued to change one after another, causing confusion. Kurtz was working as the executive producer of Disney's Return to Oz at the time, and spent most of his time in London and New York. He visited Los Angeles, the site of Little Nemo, only about once a month, and only for two hours in the afternoon. His autocratic production policy caused friction with the Japanese staff. Miyazaki submitted various reports and ideas for scenarios to Kurtz, but he never adopted them. (Note: Miyazaki later used them for Nausicaä of the Valley of the Wind and Princess Mononoke.) The Japanese staff clashed with Kurtz, and Miyazaki left Telecom in November 1982, followed by Takahata in March 1983.

When production on Little Nemo was halted in the late 1980s, Telecom was invited by Katsuhiro Otomo, who had heard that the studio had a talented crew, to join the production of his film Akira. However, in the middle of production, Fujioka requested that they make a pilot for Little Nemo (produced by Osamu Dezaki and Akio Sugino), and Telecom staff were forced to withdraw from the Akira site.

The film was completed in 1988 and released in Japan in July 1989, but the box office gross ended up around 900 million yen. In 1992, the film was released in 2,300 theaters in the U.S., but failed at the box office. The video software that was later released sold more than 4 million copies, and the production costs were eventually recouped, but the film failed to attract an audience, and Fujioka's dream of making a hit film in the U.S. was not realized. The film took seven years to complete (it took 10 years for the U.S. release), and the budget eventually ballooned to more than 5 billion yen. It was the biggest project in the history of Japanese animation, but it ended in failure, and Fujioka took responsibility for it, gave up all rights related to Tokyo Movie, and retired from the industry.

In November 1995, the Sega Group absorbed Tokyo Movie Shinsha into Kyokuichi, with Kyokuichi being the surviving company. In conjunction with the merger, Kyokuichi made Telecom Animation Film and TMS Photo, which had been subsidiaries of Tokyo Movie Shinsha, its own subsidiaries. Kyokuichi later changed its name to TMS Entertainment.

In the 1990s, after Little Nemo, the studio continued to work on international productions through TMS. The Warner Bros. animated television series The New Batman/Superman Adventures, directed by Kenji Hachizaki, Yuichiro Yano, Toshihiko Masuda, and Hiroyuki Aoyama, won a Daytime Emmy Awards for Outstanding Special Class Animated Program in 1998.

For a long time, Warner Bros. of the U.S. had subcontracted work to Telecom through TMS, but in 2000, Warner Bros. began outsourcing all production to Korea, where production costs are lower. Telecom then changed its policy and began to focus on production for the Japanese market instead of overseas. In addition, while taking on subcontract productions from TMS and other Japanese studios, from 2002 Secret of Cerulean Sand, Telecom began to produce its own productions as the prime contractor and to co-produce with other companies.

In 2009, Hoshi Shinichi Short-Short, produced by Telecom and broadcast on NHK, won the Grand Prix in the Comedy category at the 37th International Emmy Awards.

Telecom has been in debt for two consecutive fiscal years since the fiscal year ending March 2017, and on August 10 of the same year, it reduced its capital from 98 million yen to 10 million yen.

On February 17, 2026, its parent company TMS Entertainment announced that Telecom Animation Film would be absorbed and dissolved, transferring all the rights and obligations to TMS. The company posted a final loss of 346 million yen and was in debt for the fiscal year ending March 2025, according to its parent's corporate website. However, TMS would continue to run the name as a division.

== Works ==
=== Television series and original video animations ===
Title	Producer	Network(s)	Year(s)	Note	Ref(s)
Lupin the 3rd Part II	Tokyo Movie Shinsha	Nippon TV	1977–1980	11 episodes	
The New Adventures of Zorro	Filmation	CBS	1981	Credited as Tokyo Movie Shinsha	
Jarinko Chie	Tokyo Movie Shinsha	MBS	1981–1983		
Ulysses 31	DIC Audiovisuel	FR3, Nagoya Broadcasting Network	1981–1982	Pilot	
Inspector Gadget	DIC Enterprises	Syndication	1983–1986	Season 1	
The Littles	DIC Enterprises	ABC	1983–1985		
Sherlock Hound	Tokyo Movie Shinsha	RAI	1984	8 episodes	
Heathcliff	DIC Enterprises	Syndication	1984–1985	Season 1	
Mighty Orbots	Tokyo Movie Shinsha, MGM/UA Television	ABC	1984	4 episodes	
Rainbow Brite	DIC Enterprises	Syndication	1984–1986	Season 1	
Onegai! Samia-don	Tokyo Movie Shinsha	NHK	1985–1986	3 episodes	
The Wuzzles	Walt Disney Television Animation	CBS	1985	Credited as TMS Entertainment, Inc.	
Adventures of the Gummi Bears	Walt Disney Television Animation	NBC, ABC	1985–1990	Up until season 5, credited as TMS Entertainment, Inc.	
The Blinkens	Tokyo Movie Shinsha, MCA Universal		1986	Direct to video	
Galaxy High School	Tokyo Movie Shinsha	CBS	1986		
The Real Ghostbusters	DIC Enterprises	ABC, Syndication	1986–1991	Pilot and 13 episodes including "The Halloween Door"	
Dennis the Menace	DIC Enterprises	Syndication, CBS	1986–1988	Both openings and some season 1 episodes, also handled camera direction, Credited as Tokyo Movie Shinsha	
Bionic Six	Tokyo Movie Shinsha, Universal Television	Syndication, USA Network	1987		
DuckTales	Walt Disney Television Animation	Syndication	1987–1990	Original series, season 1, credited as TMS Entertainment, Inc.	
ALF: The Animated Series	DIC Animation City	NBC	1987–1989	Opening and first episode	
Lupin III: The Fuma Conspiracy	Tokyo Movie Shinsha		1987	OVA	
The New Adventures of Winnie the Pooh	Walt Disney Television Animation	ABC	1988–1991	Season 1 credited as TMS Entertainment, Inc.	
Chip 'n Dale Rescue Rangers	Walt Disney Television Animation	Syndication	1989–1990	Season 1 credited as TMS Entertainment, Inc.	
Alfred J. Kwak	Telescable Benelux B.V., Visual '80	VARA, ZDF, Televisión Española, TV Tokyo	1989–1990	3 episodes	
Fox's Peter Pan & the Pirates	Fox Children's Productions; Southern Star Productions	Fox	1990–1991	13 episodes, credited as Tokyo Movie Shinsha Co., Ltd	
Tiny Toon Adventures	Warner Bros. Animation	Syndication, Fox	1990–1992	19 episodes, credited as Tokyo Movie Shinsha	
Ozanari Dungeon	Toshiba EMI, Tokyo Movie Shinsha		1991	OVA trilogy	
Jarinko Chie 2	Tokyo Movie Shinsha	MBS	1991–1992	2 episodes	
Tiny Toon Adventures: How I Spent My Vacation	Warner Bros. Animation		1992	Direct to video, credited as Tokyo Movie Shinsa	
Batman: The Animated Series	Warner Bros. Animation	Fox	1992–1995	6 episodes plus layout for 1 episode by Dong Yang ("Harley and Ivy"), credited as Tokyo Movie Shinsha	
Animaniacs	Warner Bros. Animation	Fox; The WB	1993–1998	Original series, credited as Tokyo Movie Shinsha for seasons 1 and 2, TMS-Kyokuchi for season 4's "Cutie and the Beast/Boo Happens/Noel"	
Adventures of Sonic the Hedgehog	DIC Animation City	Syndication	1993–1996	Opening and 5 episodes, credited as Tokyo Movie Shinsha	
Gargoyles	Walt Disney Television Animation	Syndication, ABC	1994–1997	1 episode for Walt Disney Animation Japan ("Hunter's Moon, Part 2"), criedted as TAF	
Tiny Toon Adventures: Night Ghoulery	Warner Bros. Animation		1994	Originally direct to video, later aired on Fox in 1995, credited as Tokyo Movie Shinsha	
Spider-Man	Saban Entertainment, Marvel Animation	Fox	1994–1998	First 10 episodes of season 1, 1 season 2 episode ("Hydroman") and 1 season 3 episode ("Turning Point"), mostly did supervising for South Korean studios, credited as Tokyo Movie Shinsha for seasons 1 and 2, TMS-Kyokuchi for seasons 3, 4 and 5	
The Sylvester & Tweety Mysteries	Warner Bros. Animation	The WB	1995–2002	Season 1, 7 episodes, credited as Tokyo Movie Shinsha	
A Pinky and the Brain Christmas	Warner Bros. Animation	The WB	1995	Credited as TMS-Kyokuchi	
Superman: The Animated Series	Warner Bros. Animation	The WB	1996–2000	Seasons 1 and 2, 14 episodes, credited as TMS-Kyokuchi	
The New Batman Adventures	Warner Bros. Animation	The WB	1997–1999	5 episodes, credited as TMS-Kyokuchi	
An American Tail: The Treasure of Manhattan Island	Universal Cartoon Studios		1998	Direct to video, released in 2000 in the United States, credited as TMS-Kyokuchi	
Wakko's Wish	Warner Bros. Animation		1999	Direct to Video, credited as TMS-Kyokuchi	
Cybersix	Kyokuchi Tokyo Movie, NoA	Teletoon, Kids Station	1999	co-produced with NOA	
Inuyasha	Sunrise	NNS (YTV)	2000–2004	4 episodes	
Batman Beyond: Return of the Joker	Warner Bros. Animation		2000	Direct to video, credited as TMS Entertainment, Ltd.	
Secret of Cerulean Sand	TMS Entertainment	Wowow	2002	co-produced with TMS Entertainment and Koko Enterprises	
Nurse Witch Komugi	Tatsunoko Production, Kyoto Animation		2002	First OVA series, first 2 episodes	
Sonic X	TMS Entertainment	TV Tokyo	2003–2006	17 episodes	
Uninhabited Planet Survive!	self produced	NHK	2003–2004	co-produced with Madhouse	
Pazurizu	self produced	Kids Station	2004	3DCG series	
Futakoi	self produced	TV Tokyo	2004	Original series	
Tide-Line Blue	self produced	TV Asahi	2005		
Ramen Fighter Miki	self produced	Chiba TV, TV Kanagawa, TV Saitama, Yomiuri TV	2006		
Moyasimon: Tales of Agriculture	self produced	Fuji TV (Noitamina)	2007	co-produced with Shirogumi	
Nijū Mensō no Musume	self produced	Fuji TV	2008	co-produced with Bones	
Green Lantern: First Flight	Warner Bros. Animation		2009	Direct to video	
Fullmetal Alchemist: Brotherhood	Bones	JNN (MBS, TBS)	2009–2010	6 episodes	
LilPri	Shogakukan Music and Digital Entertainment, TMS Entertainment	TV Tokyo	2010-2011		
Justice League: Doom	Warner Bros. Animation		2012	Direct to Video	
Moyashimon Returns	self produced	Fuji TV	2012	co-produced with Shirogumi	
Superman vs. The Elite	Warner Bros. Animation		2012	Direct to video	
Aikatsu!	Sunrise	TV Tokyo	2012–2016	Original series, season 1 and 2 episodes of season 2 co-produced with Sunrise	
Z/X Ignition	self produced	TV Tokyo	2014		
Sengoku Basara: End of Judgement	Dentsu	Nippon TV	2014		
Lupin the 3rd Part IV: The Italian Adventure	TMS Entertainment	Italia 1, Nippon TV	2015–2016		
Phantasy Star Online 2: The Animation	TMS Entertainment	TBS, CBC, MBS, BS-TBS	2016		
Orange	TMS Entertainment	Tokyo MX, AT-X, BS11, TVA, ABC, TSB	2016		
Baki: Most Evil Death Row Convicts	TMS Entertainment		2016	OVA	
Chain Chronicle: The Light of Haecceitas	Graphinica	ABC, Tokyo MX, AT-X, TVA, BS11, TVQ	2017		
Lupin the 3rd Part 5	TMS Entertainment	Nippon TV	2018		
We Rent Tsukumogami	TMS Entertainment	NHK	2018		
Tower of God	Crunchyroll, Webtoon, TMS Entertainment	Tokyo MX, BS11, GYT, GTV	2020	Season 1	
Don't Toy with Me, Miss Nagatoro	self produced	Tokyo MX, BS11, MBS, AT-X	2021	Season 1	
Shenmue: The Animation	Crunchyroll, Williams Street, Sega, TMS Entertainment	Adult Swim (Toonami), Tokyo MX	2022		
Lupin Zero	TMS Entertainment		2022	Web series	
Four Knights of the Apocalypse	TMS Entertainment		2023		
Kawagoe Boys Sing	evg		2023		
Astro Note	Shochiku		2024		
Rick and Morty: The Anime	Williams Street, Sola Entertainment	Adult Swim	2024		
Blue Box	TMS Entertainment	JNN (TBS)	2024		

=== Films ===
Title	Producer	Release year	Notes	Ref(s)
Lupin III: The Mystery of Mamo	Tokyo Movie Shinsha	1978		
Lupin III: The Castle of Cagliostro	Tokyo Movie Shinsha	1979		
Botchan	Tokyo Movie Shinsha	1980		
Jarinko Chie	Tokyo Movie Shinsha	1980		
Sugata Sanshirou	Tokyo Movie Shinsha	1981		
Here Come the Littles	DIC Enterprises	1985		
Heathcliff: The Movie	DIC Enterprises	1986	Original wraparound footage, otherwise a compilation of seven episodes from the 1984 Heathcliff TV series	
Castle in the Sky	Studio Ghibli	1986		
Akira	Tokyo Movie Shinsha	1988		
Little Nemo: Adventures in Slumberland	Tokyo Movie Shinsha	1989		
Porco Rosso	Studio Ghibli	1992		
Pom Poko	Studio Ghibli	1994		
Lupin III: Farewell to Nostradamus	Tokyo Movie Shinsha	1995		
Whisper of the Heart	Studio Ghibli	1995		
Princess Mononoke	Studio Ghibli	1997		
Case Closed: The Fourteenth Target	TMS-Kyokuchi	1998		
The Tigger Movie	Walt Disney Television Animation; Disney MovieToons	2000	For Walt Disney Animation Japan	
Spirited Away	Studio Ghibli	2001		
The Cat Returns	Studio Ghibli	2002		
Inuyasha the Movie: The Castle Beyond the Looking Glass	Sunrise	2002		
Detective Conan: The Private Eyes' Requiem	TMS Entertainment	2006		
Detective Conan: The Lost Ship in the Sky	TMS Entertainment	2010		
Detective Conan: The Eleventh Striker	TMS Entertainment	2012		
The Wind Rises	Studio Ghibli	2013		
Detective Conan: Dimensional Sniper	TMS Entertainment	2014		
Aikatsu! The Movie	Sunrise	2014	co-produced with Sunrise	
Lupin III: Jigen's Gravestone	TMS Entertainment	2014		
Orange: Future	TMS Entertainment	2016		
Lupin III: Goemon's Blood Spray	TMS Entertainment	2017		
Case Closed: The Crimson Love Letter	TMS Entertainment	2017		
Mary and the Witch's Flower	Studio Ponoc	2018		
Lupin III: Fujiko's Lie	TMS Entertainment	2019		
Blue Thermal	self produced	2022		
Lupin the IIIrd the Movie: The Immortal Bloodline	TMS Entertainment	2025		

=== Other ===
Title	Release year	Notes	Ref(s)
Obake-Chan	1978	First project, short film	
Little Nemo: Sadao Tsukioka Pilot	1978	First Little Nemo pilot Copyright date says 1980 despite being made in 1978	
Little Nemo: Yoshifumi Kondo Pilot	1984	Second Little Nemo pilot	
Little Nemo: Osamu Dezaki Pilot	1987	Third Little Nemo pilot	
Little Nemo: TV Pilot	1989	Was supposed to be a tie in to the movie but was canceled due to the movie's failing at the box office	
Bugs Bunny Mitsubishi RVR CM	1991	2 commercials	
Don Quixote: A Dream in Seven Crystals	1994	In game animation, credited as Tokyo Movie Shinsha	
Astal	1995	In game cutscenes, credited as Tokyo Movie Shinsha	
The Adventures of Batman & Robin (video game)	1995	Sega CD version, in game cutscenes, credited as Tokyo Movie Shinsha	
Magic Knight Rayearth (video game)	1995	Sega Saturn version, in game cutscenes, credited as Tokyo Movie Shinsha	
Waynehead	1996	Opening, series animated by Philippine Animation Studio Inc. and Hanho Heung-Up Credited as TMS-Kyokuchi	
Sonic: Man of the Year	1997	Short film, originally made in 1993, 4 shorts were made but only 1 got released as bonus content in Sonic Jam, the remaining 3 shorts have not been released	
Sly Cooper and the Thievius Raccoonus	2002	PlayStation 2 version, in game cutscenes, credited as Telecom Animation Film Company	
The Adventures of Super Oil and High-Octane	2005	2 shorts, produced by Cartoon Network Japan	
Ojii-san no Lamp	2011	Short film, produced as part of Young Animator Training Project	
BUTA	2012	Short film, produced as part of Young Animator Training Project	
Rick and Morty vs. Genocider	2020	Short film, produced by Cartoon Network Japan, Justin Roiland's Solo Vanity Card Productions!, Green Portal Productions, Williams Street and Adult Swim	
From North Field	2020	Produced by Robot Communications Inc. 2 shorts	
Cosmo Samurai	2021	Short film, produced by Cartoon Network Japan, Williams Street and Adult Swim	
Summer Meets God (Rick Meets Evil)	2021	Short film, produced by Cartoon Network Japan, Justin Roiland's Solo Vanity Card Productions!, Green Portal Productions, Williams Street and Adult Swim	
Puyopuyo!! Quest	2021	Opening Animation, Created to celebrate the 30th anniversary of the Puyo Puyo series and the game's renewal	
Cosmo Samurai 2	2022	Short film, produced by Cartoon Network Japan, Williams Street and Adult Swim	
Sonic Superstars	2023	Opening Animation	

== See also ==
- Ufotable, an animation studio founded by former Telecom animators.
