= Kawagoe Boys Sing =

Japanese anime television series

- Key visual

川越ボーイズ・シング (Kawagoe Bōizu Shingu)
- Genre: Coming-of-age, comedy
- Created by: NBCUniversal Entertainment Japan
- Anime television series
- Directed by: Atsushi Matsumoto
- Written by: Kawagoe School Literary Club
- Music by: Yuki Kanesaka; Shin Rizumu; Junko Yokoyama
- Studio: evg; Telecom Animation Film (production cooperation)
- Licensed by: Crunchyroll
- Original network: Tokyo MX, BS11
- Original run: October 9, 2023 – January 15, 2024
- Episodes: 12

Kawagoe Boys Sing -Now or Never- (川越ボーイズ・シング, Kawagoe Bōizu Shingu) is an original Japanese anime television series produced by NBCUniversal Entertainment Japan and animated by evg, in cooperation with Telecom Animation Film. It is directed by Atsushi Matsumoto, written by the Kawagoe School Literary Club, with Yuki Kanesaka, Shin Rizumu, and Junko Yokoyama composing the music. Original character designs are provided by Ebimo, while Haru Watanabe adapts the designs for animation. Hiromi Kikuta is directing the sound at dugout. The series aired from October 9, 2023, to January 15, 2024, on Tokyo MX and BS11. The opening theme song was performed by Kaco. Crunchyroll streamed the series.

== Synopsis ==
Tenshi, also known as Danbocchi, is a former choir boy that loves singing, although he is afraid of singing in front of people. After singing alone for a long time and settling into a stress-free academic life, Haruo Hibiki an ex-conductor discovers Tenshi's talent while building a boys choir to restore his name. Tenshi and others reluctantly join the boys choir. Under the peculiar guidance of Hibiki, Danbocchi is rapidly overcoming his fears. Together with the rest of the boys, they grow to love performing together and are aiming at winning the national singing contest.

== Characters ==
Haruo Hibiki (響春男, Hibiki Haruo)
Voiced by: Kazuyuki Okitsu
Tenshi Dei (出井天使, Dei Tenshi) / Danbocchi (だんぼっち)
Voiced by: Shotaro Uzawa
Hiroshi Yazawa (矢沢ひろし, Yazawa Hiroshi) / Ei-chan (えいちゃん)
Voiced by: Reiō Tsuchida
Shuji Shiratori (白鳥修二, Shiratori Shuji) / Tori-chan (トリちゃん)
Voiced by: Yūki Obara
Kaito Kobashi (小橋快人, Kobashi Kaito) / IT-kun
Voiced by: Nao Nakanishi
Shizuo Barato (茨戸静男, Barato Shizuo) / Otome (オトメ)
Voiced by: Makoto Kaneko
Jin Adachi (足立尽, Adachi Jin)
Voiced by: Subaru Kimura
Kō Hyūga (日向行, Hyūga Kō)
Voiced by: Yoji Ikuta
Shin Hyūga (日向進, Hyūga Shin)
Voiced by: Yuri Ise
Tomo Hakase (葉加瀬友, Hakse Tomo) / Hakase (博士)
Voiced by: Shōta Hayama
Curtis Suzuki (鈴木カーティス, Suzuki Kātisu) / Magic (マジック, Majikku)
Voiced by: Kazumasa Fukagawa
Michiru Morimura (森村充, Morimura Michiru)
Voiced by: Hayato Dojima
Arisa Hibiki (響ありさ, Hibiki Arisa)
Voiced by: Mika Doi
Rika Iijima (飯島リカ, Iijima Rika)
Voiced by: Aya Suzaki
Zen Koarashi (小嵐然, Koarashi Zen)
Voiced by: Tatsumaru Tachibana

== Media ==
=== Episodes ===
No.	Title	Directed by (Note: Information is taken from the ending credits of each episode.)	Written by	Storyboarded by	Original release date
1	"On the Set"	Atsushi Matsumoto & Maki Odaira	Kawagoe School Literary Club	Atsushi Matsumoto & Maki Odaira	October 9, 2023
2	"To a Brightly Shining Tomorrow"; Transliteration: "Hikari Kagayaku Ashita e" (Japanese: 光輝く明日へ)	Akira Ishii	Kawagoe School Literary Club	Akira Ishii	October 16, 2023
3	"Dreaming of Andalusia"; Transliteration: "Andarushia ni Akogarete" (Japanese: アンダルシアに憧れて)	Hayato Date	Kawagoe School Literary Club	Atsushi Matsumoto & Hayato Date	October 23, 2023
4	"Comparing Heights"; Transliteration: "Se Kurabe" (Japanese: 背比べ)	Nobuo Tomisawa	Kawagoe School Literary Club	Atsushi Matsumoto & Yukihiro Matsushita	October 30, 2023
5	"LA LA LA"	Takahiro Okao	Kawagoe School Literary Club	Takaaki Ishiyama & Nobuo Tomizawa	November 6, 2023
6	"Summer Blessing"	Kasugamori Haruki	Kawagoe School Literary Club	Atsushi Matsumoto & Kasugamori Haruki	November 13, 2023
7	"Pinecones"; Transliteration: "Matsubokkuri" (Japanese: 松ぼっくり)	Yuji Himaki	Kawagoe School Literary Club	Atsushi Matsumoto & Yasushi Muroya	November 20, 2023
8	"Gettaway"	Noriyuki Fukuda	Kawagoe School Literary Club	Atsushi Matsumoto & Hiroyuki Fukushima	November 27, 2023
9	"Some Days I'm Sorry"; Transliteration: "Itsuka no Aimusōrī" (Japanese: いつかのアイムソーリー)	Nobuyuki Takeuchi	Kawagoe School Literary Club	Nobuyuki Takeuchi	December 4, 2023
10	"Denen"; Transliteration: "Denen" (Japanese: 田園)	Chiyuki Tanaka	Kawagoe School Literary Club	Atsushi Matsumoto & Kō Matsuo	December 11, 2023
11	"Unknown Colors"; Transliteration: "Annōn no Shikisai" (Japanese: アンノウンの色彩)	Haruto Ogawa	Kawagoe School Literary Club	Hondai Shimotsuki	December 25, 2023
12	"Now Or Never"	Atsushi Matsumoto	Kawagoe School Literary Club	Atsushi Matsumoto & Masahiko Murata	January 15, 2024

=== Discography ===
Original songs from the anime release in CD format in Japan and digital format worldwide as volumes.

Reference	Title	Format	No. of tracks	Label	Release date
GNCA-0681	"川越ボーイズ・シング / ORIGINAL SONGS vol.1"	CD / Digital	6	NBC Universal Entertainment	October 10, 2023
GNCA-0682	"川越ボーイズ・シング / ORIGINAL SONGS vol.2"	CD / Digital	6	NBC Universal Entertainment	November 22, 2023
GNCA-0683	"川越ボーイズ・シング / ORIGINAL SONGS vol.3"	CD / Digital	6	NBC Universal Entertainment	December 20, 2023
GNCA-0684	"川越ボーイズ・シング / ORIGINAL SONGS vol.4"	CD / Digital	6	NBC Universal Entertainment	January 24, 2024

== See also ==
- High Card, the original character designs of which is also provided by Ebimo
