= Tonbo! =

Japanese manga series

- First tankōbon volume cover

オーイ! とんぼ (Ōi! Tonbo)
- Genre: Sports
- Manga
- Written by: Ken Kawasaki
- Illustrated by: Yū Furusawa
- Published by: Golf Digest
- Magazine: Weekly Golf Digest
- Original run: August 4, 2014 – present
- Volumes: 65
- Anime television series
- Directed by: Jin-Koo Oh
- Written by: Mitsutaka Hirota
- Music by: Nobuko Toda
- Studio: OLM Division 2; SMDE (CG)
- Licensed by: Remow
- Original network: TXN (TV Tokyo), BS TV Tokyo
- Original run: April 6, 2024 – January 4, 2025
- Episodes: 26
- icon

Tonbo! (Japanese: オーイ! とんぼ, Hepburn: Ōi! Tonbo; "Hey! Tonbo") is a Japanese manga series written by Ken Kawasaki and illustrated by Yū Furusawa. It has been serialized in Golf Digest's golfing magazine Weekly Golf Digest since August 2014. An anime television series adaptation produced by OLM aired from April to June 2024. A second season aired from October 2024 to January 2025.

By November 2024, the Tonbo! manga had over 2.2 million copies in circulation.

== Plot ==
The series is set in the fictional Hinoshima Island in the Tokara Islands (based on Nakanoshima). A retired golfer, Kazuyoshi Igarashi, arrives there and finds Tonbo Ōi, a junior high school girl with a talent for golf.

== Characters ==
Tonbo Ōi (大井 とんぼ, Ōi Tonbo)
Voiced by: Rika Hayashi
Kazuyoshi Igarashi (五十嵐 一賀, Igarashi Kazuyoshi)
Voiced by: Hiroki Tōchi
Grandpa Gon (ゴンじい, Gonjī)
Voiced by: Shin Aomori
Setsuba (セツばあ)
Voiced by: Mizuka Arima
Bunpei (ブンペイ)
Voiced by: Junya Enoki
Yōko Adaniya (安谷屋洋子, Adaniya Yōko)
Voiced by: Mimi Maihane
Kanchō (館長)
Voiced by: Kenji Yamauchi
Chūzai (駐在)
Voiced by: Kentaro Takano
Wataru (ワタル)
Voiced by: Arisa Sekine
Yūma (ユウマ)
Voiced by: Satomi Kobashi
Tsubura Adaniya (安谷屋 円, Adaniya Tsubura)
Voiced by: Eri Kitamura
Hinoki Otoha (音羽ひのき, Otoha Hinoki)
Voiced by: Yui Ishikawa
Ema Kurisu (栗須エマ, Kurisu Ema)
Voiced by: Marina Inoue
Hajime Udo (有働ハジメ, Udo Hajime)
Voiced by: Eiji Hanawa
Shima-san (島さん)
Voiced by: Sanae Kobayashi

== Media ==
=== Manga ===
Written by Ken Kawasaki and illustrated by Yū Furusawa, Tonbo! started in Golf Digest's golfing magazine Weekly Golf Digest on August 4, 2014. Golf Digest has collected its chapters into individual tankōbon volumes. The first two volumes were released on May 30, 2016. As of November 2, 2026, 65 volumes have been released.

=== Anime ===
In May 2023, an anime television series adaptation was announced. It is animated by OLM (with CG provided by SMDE) and directed by Oh Jin-koo, with Mitsutaka Hirota writing series scripts, Akira Takeuchi designing the characters, Keita Hattori directing the 3DCG, and Nobuko Toda composing the music. The series aired from April 6 to June 29, 2024, on TV Tokyo. The opening theme song is "Habatake" (羽ばたけ; "Spread Your Wings"), performed by Sacra e sole, and the ending theme song is "Let's Swing", performed by Tokyo Groove Jyoshi.

After the airing of the final episode of the first season, a second season was announced. It aired from October 4, 2024, to January 4, 2025. For the second season, the opening theme song is "Seven Pieces", performed by Sacra e sole, and the ending theme song is "Kachitaku Natchatta ne" (勝ちたくなっちゃったね; "It's Time to Win"), performed by Tokyo Groove Jyoshi.

Remow licensed the series for streaming on its It's Anime YouTube channel. The company also streamed the first season of the series on Amazon Prime Video with an English dub, releasing it simultaneously as it aired in Japan. The second season was added to the platform as well.

==== Episodes ====
===== Season 1 =====
No. overall	No. in season	Title	Original release date
1	1	"Tonbo and the 3-Iron"; Transliteration: "Tonbo to San-ban Aian" (Japanese: とんぼと3番アイアン)	April 6, 2024
2	2	"The Secret of the 3-Iron"; Transliteration: "San-tetsu no Himitsu" (Japanese: 3鉄の秘密)	April 13, 2024
3	3	"Wedges and Regrets"; Transliteration: "Wejji to Kōkai" (Japanese: ウェッジと後悔)	April 20, 2024
4	4	"Sashimi Shot"; Transliteration: "O Sashimi Shotto" (Japanese: お刺身ショット)	April 27, 2024
5	5	"This Isn't Real Golf"; Transliteration: "Omae no Wa Gorufu Janai" (Japanese: お前のはゴルフじゃない)	May 4, 2024
6	6	"The Okinawan Rival!"; Transliteration: "Okinawa Kara no Raibaru!?" (Japanese: 沖縄からのライバル！？)	May 11, 2024
7	7	"The Great Monotony"; Transliteration: "Gurēto Wanpatān" (Japanese: グレートワンパターン)	May 18, 2024
8	8	"The Phantom Hole"; Transliteration: "Maboroshi no Hōru" (Japanese: 幻のホール)	May 25, 2024
9	9	"To Akureki Island"; Transliteration: "Iza, Akutsubute-jima e" (Japanese: いざ、悪礫島へ)	June 1, 2024
10	10	"Kuta's Hole Conditions"; Transliteration: "Mei Hōru no Jōken" (Japanese: 名ホールの条件)	June 8, 2024
11	11	"The Unanswerable Line"; Transliteration: "Kotae no Nai Rain" (Japanese: 答えのないライン)	June 15, 2024
12	12	"Real Feelings"; Transliteration: "Massuguna Kimochi" (Japanese: 真っ直ぐな気持ち)	June 22, 2024
13	13	"See You Later"; Transliteration: "Ittekimasu!" (Japanese: いってきます！)	June 29, 2024

===== Season 2 =====
No. overall	No. in season	Title	Original release date
14	1	"I Love This Island, and I Love Golf Too!"; Transliteration: "Kono Shima ga Suki Gorufu mo Daisuki!" (Japanese: この島が好き ゴルフも大好き！)	October 5, 2024
15	2	"Tonbo's Course Debut!"; Transliteration: "Tonbo, Kōsu Bebyū!" (Japanese: とんぼ、コースデビュー！)	October 12, 2024
16	3	"Igaiga's Parting Gift"; Transliteration: "Igaiga Kara no Sen Betsu" (Japanese: イガイガからの餞別(せんべつ))	October 19, 2024
17	4	"It Begins! The Kyushu Women's Championship!"; Transliteration: "Kaimaku! Kyūshū Joshi Senshuken" (Japanese: 開幕！九州女子選手権)	October 26, 2024
18	5	"Career Average Stroke!"; Transliteration: "Shōgai no Heikin Sutorōku" (Japanese: 生涯の平均ストローク)	November 2, 2024
19	6	"My Rival Is the Title Holder!"; Transliteration: "Raibaru wa taitoruhorudā" (Japanese: ライバルはタイトルホルダー)	November 9, 2024
20	7	"Jack-in-the-Box Golf"; Transliteration: "Bikkuri-bako no Gorufu" (Japanese: ビックリ箱のゴルフ)	November 16, 2024
21	8	"The Tossing and Turning Winds"; Transliteration: "Honrō Suru Kaze" (Japanese: 翻弄(ほんろう)する風)	November 23, 2024
22	9	"Hinoki's Troubles"; Transliteration: "Hinoki no Kattō" (Japanese: ひのきの葛藤(かっとう))	November 30, 2024
23	10	"First Time Under Pressure"; Transliteration: "Hajimete no Puresshā" (Japanese: 初めてのプレッシャー)	December 7, 2024
24	11	"Tonbo, Hole Out"; Transliteration: "Tonbo, Hōru Auto" (Japanese: とんぼ、ホールアウト)	December 14, 2024
25	12	"Winner and Courage"; Transliteration: "Shōsha to Yūki" (Japanese: 勝者と勇気)	December 21, 2024
26	13	"Tonbo's Challenge: The Heroines of Kyushu"; Transliteration: "Tonbo no Chōsen Kyūshū no Hiroin-tachi" (Japanese: とんぼの挑戦 九州のヒロインたち)	January 4, 2025

=== Other media ===
In 2023, Miki City, known as the "City of Golf" due to its large number of golf courses, collaborated with the manga to offer golf balls with a Tonbo design printed on them as gifts for people who paid hometown tax to the city, with the goal of promoting the sport in the city and contributing to its financial reconstruction. This initiative raised more than ¥270 million in revenue for the city over a six-month period, with a total of 5,712 taxpayers participating.

== Reception ==
=== Manga ===
By June 2023, the manga had over 1.55 million copies in circulation (including digital copies); by November 2024, it had over 2.2 million copies in circulation (including digital copies). The manga placed third in Rakuten Kobo's second E-book Award in the "Long Seller Comic" category in 2024.

=== Anime ===
Anime News Network had four editors review the first episode of the anime: Richard Eisenbeis expressed that while the series was unlikely to become a breakout hit, it provided sufficient entertainment to warrant watching a second episode. Rebecca Silverman praised the effective establishment of the setting and the use of the island's "casual golf culture" to hint at Igarashi's past golf-related trauma, but she criticized Tonbo's initial characterization as more of a "non-character than a person." She suggested that the series required another episode to develop its plot and characters, and concluded that it was not comparable to Birdie Wing but might suit viewers seeking a low-key sports series. Nicholas Dupree criticized the leads for lacking engagement or interest and noted that the production exhibited traits of a long-running show with modest resources and limited ambition, citing inconsistent character art and reused footage. He commented that while nothing was inherently flawed, the series could improve as characters developed and the cast coalesced, and that it adequately served as a family-friendly sports show without excelling. James Beckett criticized the "stale characters" and the visuals, which he described as stiff and lifeless, remarking that the animation appeared to have been produced with minimal budget and that the end product felt comparable to viewing the manga with color and an unwelcome soundtrack.

Fellow ANN editor Jairus Taylor reviewed the complete first season and assigned it a D+ grade. He criticized the slow pacing of the plot, the "overly technical" and "more realistic approach" to depicting golf, the underdeveloped supporting cast, and OLM's "acceptable, if largely unimpressive" production, which failed to enhance the golfing scenes. Taylor concluded that the series did not warrant seeking out and that viewers would be better served watching an actual golf match. He contrasted Birdie Wing, which compensated for golf's lack of visual excitement through flashy and exaggerated presentation. Taylor selected the first season as his pick for the Worst Anime of 2024, citing poor pacing, one-note supporting characters, bland direction of golf scenes, and insufficient incentive to invest in the second season, concluding that boredom was a greater fault than terribleness and that the series was the year's most tedious watch.

Taylor reviewed the first episode of the second season, criticizing the first half for its pacing and "overly technical explanations" but praising the second half for introducing Hinoki and the potential for an ensemble cast alongside Tonbo and Igarashi. He concluded that viewers who had followed and enjoyed the first season would likely find more of the same and have a decent experience. Erica Friedman, also writing for ANN, reviewed the complete second season and awarded it an overall B+ grade. She criticized the "overblown and silly" depiction of golf and the "otaku-level details" but praised the plot's exploration of the sport's mental aspects through character development and the improved animation relative to the first season.
