= Tatsumaru Tachibana =

Japanese voice actor

- 橘 龍丸
- Born: April 21, 1991 (age 35); Fukui Prefecture, Japan
- Occupations: Actor; voice actor
- Years active: 2010–present
- Agent: Stay Luck
- Notable work: The God of High School as Jin Mori; Aoashi as Eisaku Ohtomo; Fanfare of Adolescence as Sōjirō Sakuraba
- Spouse: Minami Tsuda (m. 2024)

Tatsumaru Tachibana (Japanese: 橘龍丸, Hepburn: Tachibana Tatsumaru; born April 21, 1991) is a Japanese actor who specializes in voice acting. Inspired by voice acting by Kappei Yamaguchi, Tachibana decided to become a voice actor himself, which he later accomplished through connections from his father's theater company. Some of his noteworthy roles include Jin Mori in The God of High School, Eisaku Ohtomo in Aoashi, and Sōjirō Sakuraba in Fanfare of Adolescence.

== Biography ==
Tatsumaru Tachibana was born in Fukui Prefecture on April 21, 1991. In kindergarten, Tachibana watched Kappei Yamaguchi perform the male version of Ranma Saotome in Ranma ½, which inspired Tachibana to pursue voice acting. At the age of ten, his father founded a theater company, which is where he started acting professionally. Tachibana later used the connections he earned from this work to become a voice actor. He announced his marriage to voice actress Minami Tsuda in June 2024.

== Filmography ==
=== TV anime ===
2019

- Welcome to Demon School! Iruma-kun as Atori
- Case File nº221: Kabukicho as Toratarō Kobayashi

2020

- The God of High School as Jin Mori

2021

- World Trigger as Yukata Kashio
- Kageki Shojo!! as Male Students
- Idol Land Pripara as Mario
- The Fruit of Evolution as Shota Takamiya
- Blue Period as Utashima

2022

- Kotaro Lives Alone as Tasuku
- Fanfare of Adolescence as Sojiro Sakuraba
- Aoashi as Eisaku Ohtomo
- Lucifer and the Biscuit Hammer as Animus

2023

- Fate/strange Fake: Whispers of Dawn as Jester Karture
- Reign of the Seven Spellblades as Fay Willock
- Bikkuri-Men as Jack
- Kawagoe Boys Sing as Zen Koarashi
- The Apothecary Diaries as Basen
- Heaven Official's Blessing as Qi Rong / Night Touring Green Lantern

2024

- Black Butler: Public School Arc as Gregory Violet
- Tonari no Yōkai-san as Benmaru Kobayashi (Betobeto-san)
- The Do-Over Damsel Conquers the Dragon Emperor as Zeke
- My Hero Academia season 7 as Kunieda
- Tower of God 2nd Season as Yuje
- The Stories of Girls Who Couldn't Be Magicians as Club Vice President
- Haigakura as Gaishi
- The Most Notorious "Talker" Runs the World's Greatest Clan as Albert Gambino
- Fate/strange Fake as Jester Karture
- Uzumaki as Tsumura

2025

- Fermat Kitchen as Magoroku Inui
- Wind Breaker Season 2 as Taishi Mogami
- Private Tutor to the Duke's Daughter as Richard Leinster
- Sakamoto Days as Shinaya
- Wandance as Ogi

2026

- Magical Sisters LuluttoLilly as Hisashi Kadoya
- Liar Game as Akira Tsumura
- The Ghost in the Shell as Informant (ep. 5)
- Overgeared as Grid

=== Video games ===
2020

- Caravan Stories as Pitsch Arbouris

2021

- The Caligula Effect 2 as the male protagonist

2025

- The Hundred Line: Last Defense Academy as Addamaque

=== Musicals ===
2016

- Fushigi Yûgi as Chichiri

2018

- Norn9 as Akito Shukuri
- Sengoku Basara as Yamanaka Yukimori

2019

- Collar × Malice as Takeru Sasazuka

=== Tokusatsu ===
2021

- Dogengers Nice Buddy as Maid Butler

2022

- Dogengers High School as Maid Butler

2023

- Dogengers Metropolis as Maid Butler

2024

- Shin Dogengers as Maid Butler
