= Welcome to the Space Show =

- Promotional image
- Directed by: Koji Masunari
- Written by: Hideyuki Kurata
- Produced by: Tomonori Ochikoshi; Atsuhiro Iwakami
- Starring: Tomoyo Kurosawa; Honoka Ikezuki; Shotaro Uzawa; Tamaki Matsumoto; Takuto Yoshinaga; Keiji Fujiwara
- Cinematography: Takaharu Ozaki
- Edited by: Masahiro Goto
- Music by: Yoshihiro Ike
- Production company: A-1 Pictures
- Distributed by: Aniplex
- Release dates: February 18, 2010 (Berlinale); June 26, 2010 (Japan)
- Running time: 136 minutes
- Country: Japan
- Language: Japanese

Welcome to the Space Show (Japanese: 宇宙ショーへようこそ, Hepburn: Uchū Shō e Yōkoso) is a 2010 Japanese animated science fiction film produced by A-1 Pictures and distributed by Aniplex. It was directed by Koji Masunari from a script by Hideyuki Kurata, and stars the voices of Tomoyo Kurosawa, Honoka Ikezuki, Shotaro Uzawa, Tamaki Matsumoto, Takuto Yoshinaga, and Keiji Fujiwara. In the film, five children rescue an alien dog, and are rewarded a trip to the Moon in response. After events cause the group to become stranded in space, they must find a way to return to Earth before the kids' parents arrive.

== Plot ==
Welcome to the Space Show, whose story "surpasses Star Wars in its scale" according to its producers, tells of the four adventures of five schoolmates and an alien dog in space during summer vacation.

The plot revolves around five elementary school kids on their "school trip". In the process of looking for their missing class pet (a rabbit named Pyon-Kichi), the children rescue a dog they find injured in a corn field. The dog turns out to be an alien called Pochi Rickman, and he invites them to visit the Moon as a reward for helping him. However, through a series of strange events, they become stranded and must make their way across the galaxy to get to Pochi's homeworld, Wan, so that they may return to Earth. Along the way they are pursued by the aliens responsible for Pochi being injured in the first place. The aliens work for the host (called Neppo) of the universe's most popular entertainment, "The Space Show", which appears to be a variety act broadcast from a mysterious moving spaceship.

Neppo is bent on using the power of the ship, called the Pet Star, to become a god. However, the ship requires a particular power source to run; namely a substance called Zughan, which turns out to be a close relative of the wasabi root and also appears to function as a form of recreational drug. As Natsuki is carrying some of the root with them in her bag, Neppo has thus targeted the group. When his thugs fail to retrieve the bag, Neppo goes himself; arriving just as the children and Pochi reach Wan. The Pet Star's tractor beams steal the bag, but they also take Amane as well.

This leads to a show down at an interstellar festival, where with the help of friends they've made along the way, the children manage not only to defeat Neppo and rescue Amane but also save the entire universe. The children are then able to return home (along with Pyon-Kichi, who had been kidnapped by Neppo's henchmen as well) and arrive at the school just before their parents show up to retrieve them.

== Characters ==
Natsuki Koyama (小山 夏紀, Koyama Natsuki)
A fifth grade student who recently moved from town, the energetic and tomboyish Natsuki longs to be a heroine. Natsuki and her mother Shimizu have just recently moved out to the country and are staying with Amane's family. Natsuki also has a great love of wasabi. Voiced by: Tomoyo Kurosawa (Japanese); Stephanie Sheh (English)
Amane Suzuki (鈴木 周, Suzuki Amane)
The youngest of the five main characters, Amane is Natsuki's cousin and in second grade. She is an amiable and reliable person who has an honest and gentle personality. She starts the film annoyed with Natsuki, in part because her older cousin was responsible for Pyon-Kichi escaping his cage, and in part because Natsuki's personality appears to have changed (becoming more arrogant and lazy) since she has moved in. But in the end, she forgives Natsuki after her cousin rescues her and realizes it wasn't Natsuki's fault, it was Neppo's henchmen who kidnapped Pyon-Kichi. Voiced by: Honoka Ikezuki (Japanese); Michaela Dean (English)
Kiyoshi Satō (佐藤 清, Satō Kiyoshi)
The oldest of the group—being in sixth grade—Kiyoshi has leadership qualities: a strong sense of responsibility, honesty, trustworthiness, and kindness. Kiyoshi is a little bit hesitant to pursue what he wants and tends to second guess his own decisions. He takes the younger children's safety and well being very seriously though, and by the end of the movie has figured out what he wants to do with himself. Voiced by: Shotaro Uzawa (Japanese); Michael Sinterniklaas (English)
Noriko Nishimura (西村 倫子, Nishimura Noriko)
Despite being a very timid fourth grader, Noriko always acts like her dream is to be an idol star. She likes to wear trendier clothing and is embarrassed by her younger brother Hiroto. Noriko is also the voice of reason when Natuski and Amane bicker. Voiced by: Tamaki Matsumoto (Japanese); Cassandra Lee (English)
Kōji Harada (原田 康二, Harada Kōji)
Kōji wears glasses and is an avid bookworm brimming with curiosity about everything. He loves anything to do with UFOs, aliens, and the occult. While on the moon, he meets and becomes friends with an alien named Ink, who works with her father Rubin as traveling repairmen. Ink's father has a rocket ship he has been building with spare parts for a long time and the children end up using it during the festival to help them reach the Pet Star. Voiced by: Takuto Yoshinaga (Japanese); Michael Jacob Wayne (English)
Pochi Rickman (ポチ・リックマン, Pochi Rikkuman)
Looking like an ordinary dog at first glance, Pochi is actually an alien from the planet Wan. After the five schoolmates helped him after they found him injured, he rewarded them by inviting them to the Moon. Pochi is actually a famous professor on his home world, even though his occasional lack of responsibility has the children suspect otherwise. Pochi's father Taro is a doctor who specializes in helping cure strange and difficult diseases. Voiced by: Keiji Fujiwara (Japanese); Marc Diraison (English)

== Production ==
The production staff of Welcome to the Space Show was announced in the February 2008 issue of Newtype magazine, and the film was originally given the working title The Space Show. The film reunites the production staff of R.O.D the TV (2003–2004), including director Koji Masunari, writer Hideyuki Kurata, and character designer Masashi Ishihama. It was animated by Japanese studio A-1 Pictures.

Masunari decided to cast child voice actors for the film's main characters through a series of auditions. The film was conceived with the themes of entertainment and friendship among children.

Scottish singer Susan Boyle, who became famous after her television performance in Britain's Got Talent, contributed the song "Who I Was Born to Be" as the film's theme song. Prior to the announcement, the film had been screened without a theme song.

== Release ==
Welcome to the Space Show made its world premiere at the 60th Berlin International Film Festival (Berlinale) in February 2010. It was screened alongside Summer Wars (2009) as part of the festival's Generation program. They were the two anime films out of a total of 28 screened at the festival. The film was also screened at the 57th Sydney Film Festival in June 2010 as part of the Kids Flicks program. It premiered in the United States at Otakon on July 31, 2010.

The film was released on Blu-ray and DVD in Japan by Aniplex on February 9, 2011, in regular and limited edition pressings. Manga Entertainment acquired home video rights in the UK and released the film in a Blu-ray/DVD combo pack on July 2, 2012. Manga UK also produced the English dub, which was recorded at NYAV Post in the US. GKIDS has acquired theatrical and home video rights to the film in North America. The film was released in North America on DVD and Blu-ray on November 11, 2014.

== Reception ==
A review by the Yomiuri Shimbun encouraged families to watch the children's adventure film. While praising the artwork in village and lunar scenes, the reviewer also called the film an "explosive sense of moe". The film was criticized for its lack of originality, primarily because A-1 Pictures appears to draw too much material from the works of Hayao Miyazaki. Unlike Miyazaki's films, however, Welcome to the Space Show "has a much edgier attitude" and is more humorous.

Anime World Order reviewed the show at the Otakon 2010 premier and praised it for its imagination, but also echoed the issues such as other reviewers as Tim Maughan have stated, primarily about the length of the movie. Tim Maughan did comment on the similarities to works by Hayao Miyazaki, stating that the film has a "much edgier attitude than any of Miyazaki's works".
