= Atsuko Tanaka (animator) =

Japanese animator

Atsuko Tanaka (田中 敦子, Tanaka Atsuko) is a Japanese animator. She has been involved with TMS Entertainment and many of Studio Ghibli's works. She is a member of the Japanese Animation Creators Association (JAniCA).

She is best known for her work on Lupin the Third, Little Nemo: Adventures in Slumberland, Animaniacs, Princess Mononoke, The New Batman Adventures, Spirited Away, Sonic X, Howl's Moving Castle, Ponyo, Belle, and The Boy and the Heron. In addition to her film work, Tanaka became a freelance animator in the early 2000s, working with studios such as Studio Chizu and Studio Ponoc after her long tenure at Telecom Animation Film. This shift allowed her to contribute to newer generations of Japanese animation, broadening her range beyond the classic films of the 1990s and 2000s. As a veteran animator in a male-dominated industry, her continued freelance work illustrated the evolving role and recognition of female creators in Japanese animation.

== Works ==
- The Castle of Cagliostro (1979) – key animator
- Lupin the 3rd (1977–1980) key animator
- The New Adventures of Gigantor (1980-1981) – key animator "The Dreaded Double Robot"
- Downtown Story (1981) – animator
- Sugata Sanshirô (1981) – key animator
- Enchanted Journey (1981) – animator
- Space Cobra (1982–1983) – animator / Telecom Animation Film
- Here Come the Littles (1985) – key animator
- Sherlock Hound (1984–1985) – animator
- Galaxy High (1986) – key animator
- DuckTales (1987–1990) – key animator "Lost Crown of Genghis Khan" (uncredited)
- The Fuma Conspiracy (1987) – key animator
- Little Nemo: Adventures in Slumberland (1989) – key animator
- Fox's Peter Pan & the Pirates (1990–1991) – animation director "The Dream" / TMS
- Tiny Toon Adventures: How I Spent My Vacation (1992) – key animator / TMS
- Adventures of Sonic the Hedgehog (1993) – animation director "Robotnik's Pyramid Scheme"
- Animaniacs (1993–1998) – animation director / Tokyo Movie Shinsha Co. Ltd.
- Pom Poko (1994) – animator / Telecom Animation Film
- Whisper of the Heart (1995) – key animato r/ Telecom Animation Film
- Pinky and the Brain (1995–1998) – animation director "A Pinky and the Brain Christmas" / TMS Kyokjichi Corporation
- The Sylvester & Tweety Mysteries (1995–2002) – animation director / key animator / Tokyo Movie Shinsha Co. Ltd.
- Superman: The Animated Series (1996–2000) – storyboard artist / key animator
- Princess Mononoke (1997) – key animator / Telecom Animation Film
- The New Batman Adventures (1997–1999) – Director / storyboard artist / key animator
- Cybersix (1999) – Storyboard / Director / key animator
- Wakko's Wish (1999) – key animator (uncredited)
- Batman Beyond: Return of the Joker (2000) – key animator
- Spirited Away (2001) – Animation Supervisor / Telecom Animation Film
- WXIII: Patlabor the Movie 3 (2002) – animator
- Sonic X (2003–2005) – key animator "Dr. Eggman's Ambition"
- Hajime no Ippo: The Champion Road (2003) – key animator
- Howl's Moving Castle (2004) – Animator
- Monmon the Water Spider (2006) – animation director
- Tales from Earthsea (2006) – key animator
- Ponyo (2008) – key animator
- Green Lantern: First Flight (2009) – key animator
- Summer Wars (2009) – key animator
- Arrietty (2010) – key animator
- Pandane to Tamago Hime (2010) – key animator
- From Up on Poppy Hill (2011) – key animator
- The Wind Rises (2013) – key animator / Telecom Animation Film
- Space Dandy (2014) – key animator "The Search for the Phantom Space Ramen, Baby"
- When Marnie Was There (2014) – key animator
- The Boy and the Beast (2015) – key animator
- Your Name (2016) – key animator
- Mary and the Witch's Flower (2017) – key animator
- Mirai (2018) – key animator
- Belle (2021) – key animator
- The Boy and the Heron (2023) – key animator
