= Seiyu Award for Best Rookie Actor =

Japanese voice acting award

- Awarded for: Best Performance by a Rookie Actor
- Country: Japan
- First award: 2007
- Currently held by: Aoi Ichikawa; Reiji Kawashima; Gen Satō (2022)

The Seiyu Award for Best Rookie Actor is one of the awards at the Seiyu Awards. Starting in 2023, "Best New Actors" is no longer separated by gender.

== Winners ==
Winners	Agency	Characters	Anime	Ref
2007
Tetsuya Kakihara	81 Produce	Mikoto Yutaka	Princess Princess	
Masakazu Morita	Aoni Production	Ichigo Kurosaki	Bleach	
2008
Wataru Hatano	81 Produce	Sam Houston; Tenshi Yuri	Toward the Terra; Saint Beast: Kouin Jojishi Tenshi Tan	
Tsubasa Yonaga	Ken Production	Ren Mihashi; Shingo Suwa	Ookiku Furikabutte; Kishin Taisen Gigantic Formula	
2009
Nobuhiko Okamoto	Pro-Fit	Shin Kanzato; Ryuji Kuhoin; Accelerator	PERSONA -trinity soul- Kure-nai; Toaru Majutsu no Index	
Yuki Kaji	Arts Vision	Akina Hiizumu; Finnian	Yozakura Quartet; Kuroshitsuji	
2010
Atsushi Abe	Ken Production	Toma Kamijo	A Certain Magical Index	
Tomoaki Maeno	Arts Vision	Toya Fujii; Saku Oyagi	White Album; Sora no Manimani	
2011
Kōki Uchiyama	Himawari Theatre Group	Banagher Links; Natsuno Yūki	Mobile Suit Gundam UC; Shiki	
2012
Takuya Eguchi	81 Produce	Kazuya Kujo; Amemiya Taiyou	Gosick; Inazuma Eleven GO	
Yoshitsugu Matsuoka	I'm Enterprise	Narumi Fujishima; Riku Seya	Kami-sama no Memo-chō; Wandering Son	
2013
Nobunaga Shimazaki	Aoni Production	Kaito Kirishima	Ano Natsu de Matteru	
Kazutomi Yamamoto	Production Ace	Kio Asuno	Mobile Suit Gundam AGE	
2014
Kaito Ishikawa	Pro-Fit	Harutora Tsuchimikado	Tokyo Ravens	
Daiki Yamashita	Arts Vision	Sakamichi Onoda	Yowamushi Pedal	
2015
Ryōta Ōsaka	Early Wing	Nagate Tanikaze	Knights of Sidonia	
Sōma Saitō	81 Produce	Twelve	Zankyō no Terror	
Natsuki Hanae	Across Entertainment	Inaho Kaizuka	Aldnoah.Zero	
2016
Yūichirō Umehara	Arts Vision	Kuroo Hazama; Wakasa	Young Black Jack; Orenchi no Furo Jijō	
Shunsuke Takeuchi	81 Produce	Producer; Hugo	The Idolmaster Cinderella Girls; Young Black Jack	
2017
Setsuo Itō	Air Agency	Shigeo "Mob" Kageyama	Mob Psycho 100	
Yūma Uchida	I'm Enterprise	Hayate Immelmann	Macross Delta	
Yūsuke Kobayashi	Yu-rin Pro	Arslan	The Heroic Legend of Arslan: Dust Storm Dance	
2018
Kōtarō Nishiyama	81 Produce	Eichi Horimiya	TsukiPro The Animation	
Shun Horie	Pro-Fit	Tsugiyoshi Sumino	Juni Taisen: Zodiac War	
Taku Yashiro	VIMS	Naoto Azuma	Tiger Mask W	
2019
Kōhei Amasaki	I'm Enterprise	Haruo Yaguchi	'Hi Score Girl	
Mark Ishii	Just Production	Chrono Shindō	Cardfight!! Vanguard G: Z	
Fukushi Ochiai	Aoni Production	Natsunosuke Bonda	Gurazeni	
Shugo Nakamura	Across Entertainment	Teru Tendō	The Idolmaster SideM	
2020
Takeo Ōtsuka	I'm Enterprise	Kakeru Kuruhara	Run with the Wind	
Gakuto Kajiwara	Haikyō	Shinra Kusakabe	Fire Force	
Kotaro Daigo	A-Light	Hodaka Morishima	Weathering with You	
Katsumi Fukuhara	Axl-One	Yukiya Araki	W'z	
Shōgo Yano	Super Eccentric Theater	Mafuyu Satō; Nanao Kisaragi	Given; Tsurune	
2021
Masahiro Itō	Hibiki	Ren Nanahoshi	Argonavis from BanG Dream!	
Chiaki Kobayashi	Office Osawa	Makoto Edamura	Great Pretender	
Shimba Tsuchiya	Himawari Theatre Group	Sagami	My Teen Romantic Comedy SNAFU Climax	
2022
Aoi Ichikawa	Office Osawa	Nagara	Sonny Boy	
Reiji Kawashima	Aoni Production	Fushi	To Your Eternity	
Gen Satō	I'm Enterprise	Fumiya Tomozaki	Bottom-tier Character Tomozaki	
