= List of The Adventures of Mini-Goddess episodes =

The cover of the first English DVD compilation released by Geneon Entertainment on February 12, 2002

The Adventures of Mini-Goddess, also known as Ah! My Goddess: Being Small Is Convenient, is a Japanese animated TV series that aired 48 episodes between 1998 and 1999. It was directed by Hiroko Kazui and Yasuhiro Matsumura and was produced by Oriental Light and Magic. The series premiered on WOWOW as a part of the omnibus show Anime Complex. It was formerly distributed in North America by Geneon Entertainment. It is part of the Oh My Goddess! series, which follows the adventures of three goddesses (Belldandy, Urd, and Skuld) and their rat companion Gan-chan.

In Japan, the series aired on WOWOW between April 6, 1998 and March 29, 1999. The season was then released on DVD and VHS by Pony Canyon. Six VHS tapes were released between December 18, 1998, and October 20, 1999, and six DVDs were released between May 19, 1999, and October 20, 1999. A DVD box set was released in Japan on February 20, 2008. For Region 1, the season was licensed to Pioneer Entertainment (now Geneon Entertainment), and was released between February 12, 2002, and August 13, 2002, in four DVD compilations, each of which contained twelve episodes. Geneon released a limited-edition box set on July 1, 2003.

The series had two pieces of theme music, both ending themes. "Denwa Shite Darling (デンワしてダーリン, Denwa Shite Dārin; "Call Me Darling")" by Yuki Ishii served as the ending theme for episodes 1–24, and "XXX (Kiss Kiss Kiss)" by Splash! served as the ending theme for episodes 25–48.

== Episode list ==
No.	Title	Original release date
1	"Let's Tell Your Fortune"; Transliteration: "Uranai Shiyō yo!" (Japanese: 占いしようよ)	April 6, 1998
Gan-chan the rat wants a female companion. To help him, Urd arrives with a crystal ball and offers to act as a match-maker. However, Urd's choices are all inanimate objects. She finally settles on a kettle as the perfect match, and Gan-chan marries Mrs. Kettle. Urd gives the kettle a voice-over and legs during the honeymoon, but Gan-chan insists on Mrs. Kettle having her own voice. However, once Mrs. Kettle can speak for herself, she declares that she has fallen for another kettle and elopes, leaving Gan-chan single again.
2	"Secret Treasure in the Attic, Part I"; Transliteration: "Yaneura no Hihō (Zenpen)" (Japanese: 屋根裏の秘宝(前編))	April 13, 1998
While Gan-chan, Urd, and Skuld laze around, a rat falls through the ceiling and mutters about a treasure before losing consciousness. They become excited and decide to hunt for the treasure. Skuld builds mechas and they begin exploring the attic. However, their search is interrupted when they are attacked by a large rat.
3	"Secret Treasure in the Attic, Part II"; Transliteration: "Yaneura no Hihō (Kōhen)" (Japanese: 屋根裏の秘宝(後編))	April 20, 1998
The three goddesses battle the rat, but their attacks are ineffective, partly due to the poor mecha design. They try to escape, but the rat calls in reinforcements and blocks their path. The gang straps a piece of cheese to Gan-chan's mecha and he distracts the rat gang. Urd and Skuld find the treasure, but are disappointed to find it is only a gold-painted windup Buddha statue.
4	"Let's Fly in the Sky"; Transliteration: "Sora o Tobō yo" (Japanese: 空を飛ぼうよ)	April 27, 1998
When Gan-chan expresses a wish to "fly like the birds", Skuld and Urd build for him a series of increasingly complex flying machines, paralleling the history of flight. The devices begin with Urd's attempt to build Icarus' wings, followed by Skuld's construction of the Montgolfier brothers' balloon, Otto Lilienthal's glider, Samuel Langley's (unsuccessful) Aerodrome and, ultimately, the Bell X-1, as Belldandy narrates. However, Gan-chan is still unsatisfied and wishes to travel to space.
5	"Let's Fly into Space"; Transliteration: "Uchū o Tobō yo" (Japanese: 宇宙を飛ぼうよ)	May 11, 1998
Gan-chan is launched into space by Urd and Skuld in a Saturn-style rocket. He orbits Earth before performing a Moon landing, parodying Neil Armstrong's famous line by saying "One small step for rat, one giant step for ratkind." He plants a flag and takes a Moon rock before returning to his spaceship. Urd and Skuld convince him to fly into deep space, but they leave him when Belldandy announces that dinner is ready, leaving Gan-chan alone in deep space.
6	"Slimming Down! Go!"; Transliteration: "Surimu de Gō!" (Japanese: スリムでGO!)	May 18, 1998
Having gained excessive weight, Gan-chan is unable to fit into his hole in the wall. Skuld and Urd help him slim down. Skuld tries several inventions, including Mr. Sauna, Mr. Icy Bath, and Mr. 4000 Years, but they all fail. Urd gives Gan-chan a pill that causes him to exercise. He exercises furiously and collapses, exhausted, after crossing the entire globe. However, they discover the next morning that Gan-chan ate gluttonously after this exercise and regained the weight.
7	"Gabira, the Giant Monster – The Birth"; Transliteration: "Daikaijū Gabira Tanjōhen" (Japanese: 大怪獣ガビラ 誕生編)	May 25, 1998
After eating a moldy cake, Gan-chan becomes ill. Urd and Skuld attempt to cure him using potions and inventions; they give him salt, exercise pills, silica gel, and a vacuum, but no method cures Gan-chan. Urd appears to solve the problem, but discovers that a side effect of the "cure" has turned Gan-chan into a mini-Godzilla named Gabira.
8	"Gabira – The Final Battle"; Transliteration: "Daikaijū Gabira Kessenhen" (Japanese: 大怪獣ガビラ決戦編)	June 1, 1998
Gan-chan, in the form of Gabira, enters the kitchen. Urd self-multiplies to form an army, and Urd and Skuld set up multiple lines of defense to defeat Gabira. Using toy tanks, they slow down Gabira but fail to stop him. When the goddesses retreat to their final line of defense and play rock music, the mold is disgusted by Gan-chan's lack of rhythm when he attempts to dance. The stereo overloads. Keiichi finally destroys Gabira by exposing him to sunlight.
9	"For Whom the Bell Tolls – The Mysterious Can of Food"; Transliteration: "Ta ga Tame ni Kane wa Naru: Kanzume no Nazo...?" (Japanese: 〜誰がために鐘は鳴る〜 缶詰の謎...?)	June 8, 1998
The goddesses and Gan-chan find a can containing a vile-looking green slime that tastes delicious. The origin of this strange food comes as a surprise—a mysterious vending machine that has appeared at the temple. When they enter the temple, Skuld, Urd and Gan-chan surprise the operators, who eject them from the machine, transform it into a spaceship, and rapidly depart.
10	"For Whom the Bell Tolls – The Secret of the Diamond"; Transliteration: "Ta ga Tame ni Kane wa Naru: Daiya no Himitsu" (Japanese: 〜誰がために鐘は鳴る〜 ダイヤの秘密)	June 15, 1998
Gan-chan is having a bad day. Urd notices Gan-chan's ring has a diamond and asks if she can have it. Gan-chan's bad luck immediately transfers to Urd, leading her to conclude that the ring is cursed. They try to place a spiritual barrier on the ring, but it fails to materialize. The gang attempts to exorcise the spirit in the ring, but a black cat emerges, gives them a business card, takes the ring, and leaves.
11	"Gabira – The Strike Back"; Transliteration: "Daikaijū Gabira Gyakushūhen" (Japanese: 大怪獣ガビラ逆襲編)	June 22, 1998
Gan-chan has a relapse transformation into the monstrous Gabira. Using the earlier strategy, Urd and Skuld bathe him in sunlight. Unfortunately, it makes Gabira even stronger. Nearly out of ideas, Skuld unleashes a golden mecha version of Gabira. The two grapple but later become friends, reconciling their differences and leaving the temple grounds.
12	"Let's Play Baseball"; Transliteration: "Yakyū Yarōze!" (Japanese: 野球やろうぜ!)	June 29, 1998
Urd and Skuld argue about who is better at baseball. They duplicate themselves to form teams. Gan-chan and Belldandy emcee to a crowd of fake fans during the game. During extra innings, Urd and Skuld begin to play in ridiculous fashions; at one point, they mimic the tornado pitch of the Tasmanian Devil. Urd later disappears for her "ultimate pitch," and the others do the same, leaving the stadium deserted.
13	"Urd's Babysitting Adventures"; Transliteration: "Urudo no Komori Nikki" (Japanese: ウルドの子守日記)	July 6, 1998
Urd babysits three young rats named Ichiko, Jiro, and Juicy. They all want to play different games, so Urd replicates herself. She makes an obedience pill to calm the rats, but her plan backfires when Juicy forces her to eat it. Later, a thunderstorm arrives to the terror of the young rats, but Urd reassures them. When the group tries to take a nap, Urd and Juicy snore so loudly that Ichiko and Jiro wake up. Before she leaves, Urd promises to return another day.
14	"The Proposal Scheme"; Transliteration: "Puropozu Daisakusen Desu da!" (Japanese: プロポーズ大作戦ですだ!)	July 13, 1998
Gan-chan has fallen in love with Kaoru, a pink female rat, and plans a date with her. He is extremely nervous, so Belldandy gives him a pill to calm him. Urd creates costumes for Gan-chan, including a bow tie and a red rose. Urd casts a spell on the rose so that Kaoru will love him forever, but Gan-chan forgets the rose. When Urd attempts to return it to him, he accidentally proposes to Urd instead of Kaoru. Kaoru departs, devastated, leaving Urd and Gan-chan staring at each other.
15	"Welcome, Newlyweds!"; Transliteration: "Shinkon-san Irasshai!! Desu da!" (Japanese: 新婚さんいらっしゃい!!ですだ!)	July 20, 1998
Gan-chan and Urd are now married. Urd has been a loving wife and treating Gan-chan extremely well, which confuses Skuld. Urd brings Gan-chan tea, washes his back, and even prepares a bed for them to share. However, when Belldandy and Skuld leave, the last petals on the enchanted rose fall, causing Urd to revert to her normal self, at which point she attacks Gan-chan.
16	"Phone Me, Darling"; Transliteration: "Denwashite Dārin" (Japanese: *電話してダーリン*)	July 27, 1998
Gan-chan tries to clean Keiichi's desk, but trips, bruises himself, and begins hiccuping. Urd cures him with an energy pill, and Gan-chan completes his cleaning. The credits roll, but Gan-chan remarks that it is too early for the show to end. Time moves in reverse, and when Gan-chan repeats his attempt to clean Keiichi's desk he is injured again. Skuld cures Gan-chan this time with a robot named Mr. Helpful. The credits roll again, Gan-chan interrupts once more, and the sequence repeats yet again. This time Gan-chan turns for aid to Belldandy, who orders Gan-chan to ask Skuld and Urd for a cure. When the credits roll for the final time, Belldandy has not yet cured Gan-chan.
17	"SOS in the Big Snowfield, Part One"; Transliteration: "Daisetsugen Esuōesu (Zenpen)" (Japanese: 大雪原SOS(前編))	August 3, 1998
The episode starts with Gan-chan, Skuld, and Urd walking in the snow, disenheartened and without food. Gan-chan faints from exhaustion, but Skuld refuses to abandon him. They use a ruler as a bridge to cross a cliff gap, but Gan-chan and Urd argue and the ruler breaks, sending them plummeting. Urd explains their situation: the air conditioner broke, but became overpowered after Skuld fixed it. Gan-chan wants to give up the quest to fix the air conditioner, but Skuld and Urd continue their mission.
18	"SOS in the Big Snowfield, Part Two"; Transliteration: "Daisetsugen Esuōesu (Kōhen)" (Japanese: 大雪原SOS(後編))	August 10, 1998
Skuld throws a paper clip over the cliff and Gan-chan begins to climb down, only to fall along the way. Gan-chan uses some bulletin board tacks to stop his fall and begins to climb. Skuld and Urd imitate him, and Urd remarks that they seem to be reenacting the movie Cliffhanger. They arrive at the air conditioner, but it fights back with a security system created by Skuld. The four eventually destroy it.
19	"Kitchen Fighters"; Transliteration: "Kitchin Faitā" (Japanese: キッチンファイター)	August 24, 1998
The rats decide to have a martial arts championship. Gan-chan, emulating Bruce Lee, defeats his first opponent by using nunchucks given to him by Urd, his trainer. Skuld enters Banpei into the competition, and Banpei wins several rounds. In the final match between Gan-chan and Banpei, Banpei has the advantage until Gan-chan drinks a bottle of sake and begins using Jackie Chan's Drunken Master technique. However, the time runs out for the match, and the last rat standing, Jose Mendoda, is declared the winner.
20	"Gan-chan's Magnificent Days"; Transliteration: "Gan-chan no Karei Naru Hibi" (Japanese: 岩ちゃんの華麗なる日々)	August 31, 1998
When Gan-chan declares that he starts every day with Belldandy's morning tea, Urd begins following him as he hunts for food. When Gan-chan wakes up from a nap, he rushes to tea and repeats his routine. Urd, annoyed, argues with Gan-chan about how simple and regular the routine is.
21	"Ah! My Buddha"; Transliteration: "Aa! Hotoke-sama!" (Japanese: ああっ!仏さま!)	September 7, 1998
Urd incorrectly believes Skuld has fallen in love with a large Buddha statue, so she miniaturizes and animates it. The statue thinks the goddesses and Gan-chan are his disciples, and declares they must follow his teachings. Buddha notices how serene Belldandy is and hits the others, telling them to be more like Belldandy. When Keiichi returns, they revert Buddha to his original state.
22	"The Story of Gan-chan: Love Me to the Bone"; Transliteration: "Gan-chan no Hone Made Aishite" (Japanese: 岩ちゃんの骨まで愛して)	September 14, 1998
Gan-chan announces that he has a new girlfriend named Koharu-chan. Urd and Skuld interview him as a news crew would, and discover that he is attracted to the way she eats. Urd and Skuld then discover, to their disgust, that Koharu-chan eats everything offered to her. When Gan-chan tries to kiss Koharu, she engulfs half of his body with her mouth.
23	"Let's Form a Band! Side A"; Transliteration: "Bando Yarōze! Ei Omote" (Japanese: バンドやろうぜ!A 表)	September 21, 1998
Urd and Skuld need a drummer for their new band. Urd replicates herself and Skuld makes a drum machine, but Gan-chan demands to be drummer, so Urd tests his drumming skill. As they select a vocalist, Urd, Skuld, and Gan-chan all try to outdo each other. Belldandy arrives and becomes the singer after demonstrating her mouth recorder. They argue over the name of the band before deciding on "Goddess Fantastic Band".
24	"Let's Form a Band! Side B"; Transliteration: "Bando Yarōze! Bī Omote" (Japanese: バンドやろうぜ!B 表)	September 28, 1998
To pick a leader for the band, the characters try several techniques that are all rigged. They finally decide to vote for the leader and Belldandy wins. They sell tickets for the band's concert and fix a mistake on the posters. The concert is attended by a huge crowd of rats, who pay with food. Gan-chan is nervous about the concert, but Skuld and Urd use inventions and drugs to calm him down.
25	"Chu-Hard – Gan-chan's Desperate Situation"; Transliteration: "Chū Hādo – Gan-chan Zettai Zetsumei" (Japanese: Chu-Hard - 岩ちゃん絶体絶命)	October 5, 1998
The goddesses ask Gan-chan to guard the refrigerator, after securing it with Skuld's Mr. Safety. The goddesses' paranoia is well-founded; while they are gone, Gan-chan falls asleep. A group of rats attack and hold Gan-chan's rat friends hostage. He wakes up from his nap, is discovered, and flees. The terrorist rats set up a computer system to hack Mr. Safety, and Gan-chan infiltrates the group of computer rats.
26	"Chu-Hard 2 - Descent of the Devil"; Transliteration: "Chū Hādo Tsū – Maō Kōrin" (Japanese: Chu-Hard 2 - 魔王降臨)	October 12, 1998
The computer rats attempt several passwords to unlock Mr. Safety, but none are successful. The rats are led by Marller, who suggests the use of heavy artillery. Gan-chan subdues the terrorist rat squad, but Marller arrives and easily defeats Gan-chan. Just in time, the goddesses return. They greet Marller as a friend and talk with her, so she gives up. They open the fridge and reveal a cheesecake, which they share and eat.
27	"Pop! Goes the Urd!"; Transliteration: "Urudo de Pon!" (Japanese: ウルドでポン!)	October 19, 1998
Urd and Gan-chan host a chat show with questions from viewers. After answering one question, they are interrupted by an advertisement from Skuld Electronics Group. They attempt to answer two more questions, but the answers take too long. When Gan-chan asks Belldandy if she likes rats, Urd discovers that the "viewer questions" are all written by Gan-chan.
28	"Rainy Day"	October 26, 1998
While watching the rain outside, Urd watches a crow fly away. She takes a walk with an umbrella and rides down the river on a hat. She walks down the beach, travels on the subway, and walks outside, seeing the crow again. Then she sees Skuld, Belldandy, and Gan-chan, and runs toward them, smiling.
29	"Let's Meet in Our Dreams"; Transliteration: "Chikyū Saigo no Kessen / Yume de Aimashō" (Japanese: 地球最後の決戦 / 夢で逢いましょう)	November 2, 1998
Urd dreams that she defeats Marller and saves the world from destruction. Skuld creates Mr. Dream TV, which allows others to see the subject's dreams. When they examine Gan-chan, his dream is so boring that Skuld modifies it so that he dreams about Belldandy confessing her love to him. In the dream, he makes negative comments about Skuld and Urd, so they attack him. They attach Belldandy to Mr. Dream TV and the episode ends with the other characters staring at the monitor in shock.
30	"Female Detective Skuld's First Case... Mystery of Three Stolen Treasures: The Dangerous Trap Hidden in Steamy Smoke!"; Transliteration: "Onna Meitantei Sukurudo no Jikenbo Wan – Nusumareta Mittsu no Hihō no Nazo Yukemori Kakusareta Kiken na Wana!" (Japanese: 女名探偵スクルドの事件簿 1 盗まれた三つの秘宝の謎 湯煙に隠された危険な罠!)	November 9, 1998
Skuld the detective looks for her stolen ice cream, Gan-chan's stolen cheese, and Urd's stolen pickled squid. They investigate Marller, but she is not the thief. Skuld tests two devices to catch the thief at the scene of the crime, but the characters fall asleep without catching anybody. Belldandy appears with a hot pot containing all of the stolen items, and the characters enjoy it while Marller looks on, disgusted.
31	"Goddess Love Theater – Goddess Blade"; Transliteration: "Megami Ai no Gekijō – Megami no Ken" (Japanese: 女神愛の劇場 - 女神の剣)	November 16, 1998
Skuld, dressed as a medieval knight, attacks a castle. Gan-chan, a sorcerer from the castle, declares that he has kidnapped Belldandy. Skuld attacks, but Gan-chan is struck down by Urd, who claims that he was being controlled by someone else. Marller appears, attacking Urd and summoning a large rat dragon. The dragon disobeys Marller and attacks the entire group, but Belldandy appears and defeats it.
32	"Quick Fix Division of the Tariki Hongan Temple"; Transliteration: "Kochira Tariki Honganji-nai Sugu Yaru Ka" (Japanese: こちら他力本願寺内 すぐやる課)	November 30, 1998
Urd, Skuld, and Gan-chan open a "Quick Fix" club. A pink rat is their first customer. Her son is stuck in a gap in the kitchen, and they try to save him with a variety of strange methods. Skuld begins building a robot, and Urd gives Gan-chan a pill. They fiddle with their plans for so long that Belldandy saves the young rat instead. Wondering how Belldandy did it, they try to recreate the situation by stuffing Gan-chan into the hole.
33	"Fishing Journal"; Transliteration: "Tsuri Basu Nisshi" (Japanese: 釣りバス日誌)	December 7, 1998
Gan-chan is fishing in the bathtub when Urd becomes intrigued. Gan-chan explains to Urd how to fish, but Urd ignores him and begins fishing in a different way. Gan-chan is more successful at first, but Urd ups the stakes by using a shark lure. They begin to catch larger and larger fish, keeping track on an electronic scoreboard, but the power goes out and their scores are lost. Together, they reel in an extremely large fish, who heads toward Gan-chan. He declares victory, but the fish swallows him.
34	"Give Me Some Servants"; Transliteration: "Ware ni Shimobe o" (Japanese: 我にしもべを)	December 14, 1998
Marller arrives with a team of rats intent on causing chaos. Her rat henchmen capture Urd, Skuld, and Gan-chan with a bottle of sake, ice cream, and cheese respectively. She tries to capture Belldandy, but Belldandy has gone to make tea. When Marller checks on her henchmen, they are having a party with their captives. The Diamond of Fear, which Marller was trying to activate, shocks Marller instead.
35	"Rules of the Ninja, Volume I"; Transliteration: "Shinobi no Okite Ue no Maki" (Japanese: 忍びの掟 上の巻)	December 21, 1998
Marller summons new servants (three ninja girls) from a fighting game at an arcade. She orders them to attack the goddesses, and they disappear to find their targets' weaknesses. They sneak into the temple but are found by Skuld's Mr. Patrol, who tries to detain them. However, Mr. Patrol fails, and the goddesses wonder what is wrong with the robot. The ninjas complete their scouting and prepare a plan.
36	"Rules of the Ninja, Volume II"; Transliteration: "Shinobi no Okite Shimo no Maki" (Japanese: 忍びの掟 下の巻)	January 4, 1999
The ninjas enter the temple, intent on causing chaos. Mr. Patrol attacks Urd, but Urd deflects the shot and knocks out Mr. Patrol. The characters discover that Urd is a fake. The fake Urd attacks Belldandy, but Belldandy hands her a 500-yen coin, and "Urd" dashes away. The goddesses ask the real Urd what is going on, but she has no idea. Mr. Patrol discovers the ninja girls on the ceiling, and the goddesses demand to know who they are. Before they answer, they notice the time and dash off to watch their favorite ninja TV show.
37	"Urd vs. Urd"; Transliteration: "Urudo tai Urudo" (Japanese: ウルド対ウルド)	January 11, 1999
Urd loses an earring and clones herself to find it. She orders her clones to find her earring while she takes a nap. When she wakes up, she discovers that only a few of her clones have returned and the others have rebelled against her. They are led by a clone who has Urd's other earring. She declares war on the other Urd, but they cannot win against each other. It deteriorates to rock, paper, scissors, but each game ends in a draw.
38	"Gan-chan Runs for Election "Being Self-Made" Edition"; Transliteration: "Gan-chan Senkyo ni Tatsu Risshi Hen" (Japanese: 岩ちゃん選挙に立つ 立志編)	January 18, 1999
Gan-chan is running in an election and is faring well against his opponent, Gon, due to the help of the goddesses. However, Marller appears and offers Gon help. Gon hosts a party for the rat leaders of the temple and wins them over easily with the help of the ninja girls (dressed as escorts). He also starts a smear campaign and incites a crowd against Gan-chan. The goddesses investigate, and Urd discovers Gon plotting with Marller.
39	"Gan-chan Runs for Election "Times of Change" Edition"; Transliteration: "Gan-chan Senkyo ni Tatsu Fūun Hen" (Japanese: 岩ちゃん選挙に立つ 風雲編)	January 25, 1999
The rats hold a public debate, and Gon shames Gan-chan for the material dug up by the smear campaign. Gan-chan is losing badly, but Urd arrives with the captured ninja girls. Urd pops truth pills into their mouths, and they reveal all. Belldandy charms everybody and Gon apologizes for his actions. Gan-chan and Gon make amends and promise to run a clean election. On Election Day, to everyone's surprise, Belldandy wins instead of either Gon or Gan-chan.
40	"Urd's Ultimate Diet"; Transliteration: "Urudo Kyūkyoku Daietto" (Japanese: ウルド究極ダイエット)	February 1, 1999
When Urd finds that her skirt does not fit, she begins a diet. She tries magic pills, but Gan-chan comments on how those never work. Urd tries to keep busy with chores, but drinks so much sake that she regains her weight. She concentrates hard on forgetting to eat, but fails again. She eats tofu, but regains the weight by eating too much. She tries again with new ideas but they all fail; Skuld and Belldandy point out that goddesses cannot gain or lose weight and that the skirt shrunk.
41	"Happy Birthday, Gan-chan"; Transliteration: "Happī Bāsudei Gan-chan!" (Japanese: ハッピーバースデイ岩ちゃん)	February 8, 1999
On Gan-chan's birthday the goddesses prepare a great gift. They give him the Goddess Wish Maker, which grants three wishes before midnight. Asleep, Gan-chan dreams of a romantic encounter with Belldandy, but wakes up in the evening without having wished anything. Since the Wish Maker grants any wish it hears, it grants the wish of one of the goddesses. Gan-chan hurriedly tries to grant other wishes so that the Wish Maker does not grant them, but he loses another. As he tries to think of his final wish, he wastes his final wish by wishing for more time.
42	"Ah! My Average College Student"; Transliteration: "Aa! Heibon na Daigakusei!" (Japanese: ああ!平凡な大学生!)	February 15, 1999
Gan-chan ponders the "average college student" mentioned in the opening narration. Urd and Skuld attempt to explain but, to his surprise, the description sounds like himself—working part-time, partying, eating and sleeping, and falling in love. He asks to see the student, but he repeatedly misses Keiichi, the "average college student".
43	"This Happens Once in a While"; Transliteration: "Konna Koto mo Arunda ne" (Japanese: こんなこともあるんだね)	February 22, 1999
Gan-chan, Skuld, and Urd realize that the show is running even on their day off. They use several backdrops, but none of them work. Belldandy arrives with a script, but when they collaborate on the set's design, they end up arguing. When they finally agree to work together, they launch into outer space just as the credits roll.
44	"Gan-chan the Locomotive"; Transliteration: "Kikansha Gan-chan" (Japanese: 機関車岩ちゃん)	March 1, 1999
Gan-chan reads a number of train adventure books. He dreams that he is the Steam Locomotive 150 and travels on railroads while greeting the goddesses embodied as trains. Urd, as the Mallard Train, easily beats Gan-chan in a race. Skuld, as the Swiss Brienz Rothorn, climbs to the cupboard to snack. Gan-chan chases after her but to his dismay, he accidentally ends up at the roller coaster-like Extreme Thrill Ride Course.
45	"The Miso Jar"; Transliteration: "Miso no Tsubo" (Japanese: 味噌の壺)	March 8, 1999
When Gan-chan gets stuck in a jar of miso sauce, he finds that the walls are too slippery to climb and too thick to break. He calls for help, but nobody hears him. He imagines what life would be like if he lived in the miso jar. Urd wants miso for her curry so she pours hot spices into the jar and stirs it, but does not take any miso out, so Gan-chan is still stuck in the jar. After falling unconscious, he manages to escape. He chases the goddesses while completely covered in miso, frightening them.
46	"Deluxe Game of Life"; Transliteration: "Derakkusu Jinsei Sugoroku" (Japanese: DX人生すごろく)	March 15, 1999
The characters decide to play Life, but all of the game's actions happen in real life. Skuld opens a company, Urd goes on vacations, Gan-chan gets married and has children, and Belldandy studies. When they try to quit the game, they cannot figure out how. They declare bankruptcy but end up working on a farm until someone dies in peace.
47	"Mekimeki High School Memorial"; Transliteration: "Mekimeki Memoriaru" (Japanese: めきめきメモリアル)	March 22, 1999
Gan-chan desperately wants to experience stereotypical spring love, so he prays to God. As goddesses, Urd and Skuld wonder why he does not just ask them for help, but Skuld puts Gan-chan in her Dating Sim invention anyway. Inside the game, Gan-chan only eats and sleeps instead of entering dating scenarios, so Skuld forces him to "date". Gan-chan fails the scenarios several times until Skuld finally takes control of Gan-chan and completes them herself. He graduates after beating every scenario, but a tree falls on him, ending the game.
48	"What'll Happen Next?"; Transliteration: "Korekara Dō Naru no?" (Japanese: これからどうなるの?)	March 29, 1999
The gang wonders what to do for the final episode of the series, but reject each idea suggested. When they discuss death, Skuld reveals that Gan-chan has had various incarnations and has been cloned throughout the show. Gan-chan suddenly wakes up from his dreams repeatedly until Urd stops the redundant dream cycle. Belldandy suggests a party outside, so the goddesses have a picnic and they invite Gan-chan. They take a commemorative photo, but Gan-chan jumps in front of the camera, ruining the picture.
