= Urd (Oh My Goddess!) =

- Oh My Goddess! character
- Urd and her Angel World of Elegance
- First appearance: Chapter 13 (manga); Season 1, episode 8
- Created by: Kōsuke Fujishima
- Voiced by: Japanese Yumi Tōma English Lanelle Markgraf (OVA); Mary Elizabeth McGlynn (Movie); Wendee Lee (Mini-Goddess); Vibe Jones (TV)

In-universe information
- Species: Goddess/Demon hybrid
- Gender: Female
- Relatives: Tyr (father); Hild (mother); Belldandy (half-sister); Skuld (half-sister)
- Rank: Second class, management limited license
- Dimension: 10th (Yggdrasil)
- Elemental Affinity: Lightning
- Angel: World of Elegance

Urd (ウルド, Urudo) is a fictional character in the popular Oh My Goddess! manga and anime, voiced by Toma Yumi (冬馬由美). In the series, her character is only loosely based on the deity Urðr from Norse mythology. Visually, her character design shows influences from shoujo and Art Nouveau.

== Creation and conception ==
Urd was one of a series of characters created by Kōsuke Fujishima, and is depicted as the older sister of Belldandy. Belldandy, Keiichi Morisato, Skuld (Urd and Belldandy's younger sister) and Urd make up the four major characters in Oh My Goddess!. Urd first appeared in the manga in chapter 14, Sexy sister, but she has also been depicted in a novel (Ah! My Goddess: First End), three anime series (Oh My Goddess! (OVA), Ah! My Goddess and The Adventures of Mini-Goddess) and in Ah! My Goddess: The Movie.

=== Norse origins ===
Like her sisters, Belldandy and Skuld; Urd has her origins in Norse mythology. Urd is one of the three Norns and represents the past, (the Norse Verdandi representing the present, with Skuld representing the future). Nevertheless, other than her name, Urd (like her Oh My Goddess! sisters) has little in common with her Norse namesake.

Unlike the problems with transliteration that were encountered with Belldandy, "Urd" presented no significant difficulties for translators. While Toren Smith determined that "Urthr" would be the more accurate translation of the Old Norse, when translating the manga series into English he acknowledged that "Urd" was an accepted alternate translation, and thus was comfortable using the spelling.

== Biography ==
Urd is Belldandy's older sister and is the second Goddess to appear to Keiichi. Urd ranks as Goddess second class, management category limited license, similar to her youngest sister Skuld. She is Yggdrasil's System Administrator and Manager.

Although her powers exceed those of her sisters, she was supposedly relegated to second class ranking due to her tendency to lie according to her younger sister, Belldandy. Later, the real reason that Urd dropped the first class license examination was revealed to be because she was asked why she wanted to be a first class goddess. When she did not answer and the licensing goddess said "I think it better if you don't," meaning don't become a first class goddess. Many years later, Urd once again took the first-class licensing exam this time examined by Peorth and Belldandy. At one point, Peorth commented that Urd's control and mastery of her own powers, exceeded her own. At the end of this story arc the licensing goddess approved her first-class exam to which Urd surprisingly declined. She explained to Peorth that a first class goddess' prime directive is to protect and bless all things. However, Urd wishes to selectively protect what is most dear to her (this is followed by a page with Urd drawn enveloping her sisters with her black and white wings). She also concluded that there can be use in a Goddess that can lie, which is forbidden to first class goddesses.

Urd has extensive knowledge of potion lore. She checks her cabinet of potions each day and can tell if even a minute amount is missing. Urd recharges her energy by drinking sake and travels via television screens. She bears the emblem of the past. If allowed to wield her full first class power unsealed, Urd could possibly be the most powerful of the Goddesses on Earth. Her power is so great that she unknowingly burned Peorth (a first class Goddess) by merely touching her shoulder to which Peorth stated "It's no wonder the Almighty was cautious about her powers."

Urd fancies herself a Goddess of Love, although the mishaps of using her magical potions and her general lack of restraint tends to complicate, rather than stimulate, Keiichi and Belldandy's love life. She came to Earth to spur Keiichi onward with love potions and deceitful though well-meaning advice, but as punishment for deserting her post and for using her powers on Earth without authorization, The Almighty banished her from Heaven until further notice. That notice of return came after the Terrible Master Urd episode c. chapter 47, but by then she wanted to stay on Earth and everyone helped muck up things so she couldn't go back right away. She and Skuld have since done emergency duty on Yggdrasil in heaven at least twice since then, as of ch 162.

As she demonstrates later in the manga, she can exercise immense control over her powers despite her second-class status. She was able to draw her personal sigil using first-class lightning magic on her first attempt, a task that First Class Goddess Peorth needed numerous attempts to successfully complete.

Urd shares a common father with her younger sisters (Belldandy, Skuld), but has a different mother, the Demon Lord Hild. Their father has yet to be introduce to the series, but it is implied that he is someone of high status. Because of her heritage, Urd is a hybrid of Goddess and Demon, reflected in the half-white, half-black appearance of her Angel, World of Elegance. Urd is the first and only hybrid introduced in the series, and possibly the only hybrid in the Ah! My Goddess universe. Perhaps due to her Demonic heritage, Austrian Polka (in the English manga) or Enka (in the Japanese manga and TV series) instantly puts Urd to sleep and she is unable to awaken until the music ceases. Similarly, the demon Marller dances to rock music, and the two often use these weaknesses against each other.

Keiichi's friends and his sister Megumi are aware of Urd's existence and her relationship with Belldandy and residency at Keiichi's home; however, for the most part they are not aware of her "goddess" status.

For the longest time, she was unable to summon her angel since she was so scared when she first saw it and ordered it never to come out. This was caused by her self-doubt at being a hybrid Goddess/Demon since she equated having pure white wings as the sign of being a true Goddess. She has since gotten over whatever self-doubt that was holding her back and can now once again call her angel at will, much to Skuld's chagrin (she had originally thought that Urd had no angel and wanted to top her eldest sister by being first).

== Personality ==
Unlike her younger sister Belldandy, Urd is very impulsive and headstrong. Belldandy describes Urd as being very passionate about everything she does. Urd is a great believer in the idea that the 'End justifies the Means', although, as Belldandy puts it: "...she gets so wrapped up in the means that she forgets what the end was." She once stole Sleipnir to get a cure for a sick Belldandy, but spent so much time in the effort to master riding Sleipnir that it took eight days for her to get to the place where the cure was. Another god had fetched the cure six days earlier. Despite such, she usually means well and will do anything to protect her loved ones. Because of her being the oldest, she believes it's also her duty to look after Belldandy and Skuld.

Urd's impulsiveness often makes her act first without fully considering the consequences. She is also a constant meddler, seemingly unable to leave well enough alone. She is also quite short tempered for a goddess, and is rather easy to irritate and anger. Urd is also notable for her tendency to lie, something a goddess supposedly can't do (or, more accurately, it is something a goddess shouldn't do, being against the rules). Although she's not a pathological liar, she's more than willing to distort the truth if needed to accomplish an objective. She is also very open about (and rather proud of) her sexuality, evidenced by her provocative dress, jibes at the younger Skuld and her slightly comical distress when turned into a child as a result of energy drainage. Her first appearance to Keiichi Morisato was through a semi-pornographic video.

Urd has an interesting love-hate relationship with her youngest sister, Skuld. Both seem to antagonize one another at times, with Urd usually teasing Skuld about her age, bust size, and apparent lack of talent when it comes to magic. However both do care for each other and will come to the other's aid when necessary. Urd and Skuld are commonly seen playing different games at the table in front of the television for rights to watching their favorite shows, although the two of them have stated that simply watching television isn't as fun as competing for the television, they have been joined at times by Belldandy, Keiichi's mother and Peorth. When Keiichi asked Belldandy "Are they best friends or what?" Belldandy replied with a smile and "They're best friends. I almost envy their ability to feel so strongly for each other."

For a goddess, Urd seems to have an amazing tendency to have her plans backfire, usually a result of her impulsive tendency to use raw power to solve a situation. Given her power levels this tends to cause explosions. Quite often, something will happen to louse up whatever scheme she's currently cooked up. Examples including: drinking one of her own love potions, trying to help Belldandy bake a cake and blowing up the kitchen, trying to help Keiichi build a motorbike and blowing up the garage, trying to dispel a number of computer "bugs" and blowing up the house, and so on.

One of Urd's most defining traits is her mixed Goddess-Demon ancestry. Because of this unique heritage, Urd is occasionally uncertain of her status within her world, as her Goddess and Demon personalities are always in conflict inside her. It was this inner conflict that allowed the Lord of Terror to eventually overcome Urd's will at one point. Deep in her heart, she truly wishes to be recognized as a Goddess and, in her earlier years, often looked up to Belldandy as a role model. This has led Urd to quietly deny her demonic heritage, much to the consternation of her mother, Hild.

Yumi Touma has said that it is only in the last of the OAV episodes that Urd can be seen "as an older sister, one that you can depend on."

== World of Elegance's appearances ==
Episodes in which World of Elegance has appeared.

#	Episode
1x21	Ah! The One I Yearn For Is A White-Winged Angel!
1x25	Ah! Urd's Small Love Story?
2x14	Ah! My Darling Cupid!
