= Skuld (disambiguation) =

Skuld may refer to:

- Skuld, one of a group of three norns in Norse mythology
- Skuld (princess), a princess in Norse mythology
- 1130 Skuld, an asteroid discovered on 2 September 1929 and named after the Norn
- Skuld (Oh My Goddess!), a fictional character named after the Norn in the anime/manga series Oh My Goddess!
- Assuranceforeningen Skuld, a marine insurance company, based in Oslo
- SS Skuld, a cargo ship in service 1947-48
