= Skuld (Oh My Goddess!) =

- Oh My Goddess! character
- Skuld and her Angel Noble Scarlet
- First appearance: Chapter 32 (manga); Season 1, episode 13
- Created by: Kōsuke Fujishima
- Voiced by: Japanese Aya Hisakawa English Pamela Weidner (OVA); Sherry Lynn (Movie, Mini Goddess); Annice Moriarty (TV)

In-universe information
- Species: Goddess
- Gender: Female
- Relatives: Urd (half-sister); Belldandy (sister); Tyr (father); Ansuz (mother)
- Rank: Second class, first category, limited license
- Dimension: 10th (Yggdrasil)
- Elemental Affinity: Water
- Angel: Noble Scarlet

Skuld (スクルド, Sukurudo) is a fictional character in the anime/manga Oh My Goddess! and is the younger sister of Belldandy. Her character design shows influences from shoujo and Art Nouveau.

== Creation and conception ==
Skuld was one of a series of characters created by Kōsuke Fujishima, and is depicted as the younger sister of Belldandy, one of the two main protagonists of the series. Along with the characters of Belldandy, Urd and Keiichi Morisato, she is regarded as one of the four major characters in Oh My Goddess!. Skuld's first appearance in the manga was in chapter 32, The Third Goddess, but she has also been depicted in a novel (Ah! My Goddess: First End), three anime series—Oh My Goddess! (OVA), Ah! My Goddess and The Adventures of Mini-Goddess—and in Ah! My Goddess: The Movie.

=== Norse origins ===
Like her sisters, Belldandy and Urd; Skuld has her origins in Norse mythology. Skuld is one of the three Norns and represents the future (while Belldandy represents the present and Urd the past), and this role continues into the series, although the three Oh My Goddess! characters otherwise bear no resemblance to their Norse namesakes. Her affinity is with water, and her magic usually involves manipulating water. Unlike the problems with transliteration that were encountered with Belldandy (resulting in Verdandi becoming "Belldandy" in the manga), "Skuld" presented no difficulties for translators.

== Biography ==
Skuld is the younger sister of Belldandy (who she refers to as Onee-sama, lit. "Big sis" in the English anime) and is the third Goddess to appear to Keiichi Morisato. Skuld has a Goddess second class, type one, limited license, a category similar to her eldest sister Urd. Her true age is unknown, but her appearance (and actions) is that of a girl in her early teens.

Skuld is one of Yggdrasil's system debuggers. She compensates for her lack of magic power with her innate talent for invention which is known throughout Heaven (though it is revealed much later that this is also a type of magical ability). Skuld recharges her energy by consuming ice cream and travels via warm or hot water. (She can't swim.) She bears the emblem of the future.

Skuld is an engineering genius, capable of building just about anything out of the most mundane parts under most limited resources. Sample gadgets have included: explosives, a neutrino detector, glasses that allow user to see invisible "computer bugs," and even a device for removing a miniature black hole from Keiichi's body. Banpei-kun RX and the converted mannequin Sigel are "living" proof of her talent. She can compute equations and redesign even the most complex engineering blueprints in no time. All too frequently, though, she forgets to include instructions with her devices, which can create havoc if someone unsuspecting of their true power (such as Keiichi) interferes with them. Other times, she will concentrate too much on one aspect of a device (usually power) and forgets to compensate by boosting other aspects of the same device, making many of her inventions rather unstable. Though many of her contraptions tend to blow up, or self-destruct, she dislikes machines that have meaningless functions. In her battle with demonic puppet master, Mokkurkalfi she states that she dislikes machines whose prime directive is meaningless combat, and that a true mechanic must value the sanctity of his or her mecha's life.

In the manga, she has been gradually developing the ability to do magic. For a long time one of her only magic skills was the ability to imprint words (usually insults) on the surface of her targets, a power she often used when expressing frustration with Urd and Keiichi. Upon meeting a young boy named Sentaro, who taught her how to ride a bike, Skuld became determined to never quit and began to practice with her powers more, learning how to levitate small objects. When Sentaro was in danger, Skuld created a huge wave which saved him, although Urd, who was nearby, stated that it would have caused a huge flood if she hadn't been there to help contain it. Skuld's spells sometimes get out of control (which usually results in large waves of water), which Urd constantly teases her for. However, Urd states that losing control of a low level spell is proof of the depths of her true power.

Skuld's latent power is addressed once more in Chapter 256 of the manga in a one on one mecha battle with the demon Mokkurkalfi. Belldandy explains that Skuld uses a type of magic called Direct Manipulation, and has been able to unconsciously access this ability since the very beginning. This magic presents itself through Skuld's hands, and it is because of this magic that Skuld is always able to build machines even out of mundane objects. It is explained that Skuld's magical field is always active because of this, even if she's unconsciously aware of this fact. However, because Skuld has a low capacity her powers are restricted to building machines. Belldandy states that if Skuld were to hone this power, she could potentially be the strongest of the three sisters in the future. Urd on the other hand pleas to Keiichi to keep this a secret because she does not want her sister to get a big ego.

She travels to Earth after Belldandy's proximity to Keiichi started creating an increasing number of bugs in Heaven's supercomputer Yggdrasil. At least that was her official excuse, as she believed Belldandy was living with Keiichi against her will. She tried to convince Belldandy to return to Heaven to resolve the bug problem and at the same time with the ulterior motive of alleviating her loneliness. After realizing that Belldandy's relationship with Keiichi was not going to end any time soon, Skuld decides to stay on Earth and act as Belldandy's unofficial chaperone.

Skuld regularly clashes with her sister Urd, particularly when it comes to Belldandy's relationship with Keiichi. However, the two sisters do love each other and will work together to solve a problem or stave off a mutual threat.

In the manga, Skuld's engineering skills made her a minor celebrity around the Nekomi Tech campus, especially when she engaged in a "Robot Wars" competition with Keiichi's sister Megumi Morisato. Keiichi's friends are aware of Skuld's existence and of her living with Keiichi and Belldandy; however, they do not know of her "goddess" status.

Unlike Belldandy and Urd, Skuld did not possess an angel when she was first introduced. Later on in the manga she found an angel egg in Urd's room and accidentally swallowed it (whilst in the process of performing the classic little kid rebellion of touching something that was specifically marked as "hands off!", namely the egg.), leading to the birth of Noble Scarlet. Because of Skuld's lack of magic power, Noble Scarlet lacked the full unequivocal obedience an angel must have for her goddess. After interfering with Skuld's budding relationship with Sentaro, Noble Scarlet returned to her egg form as per Skuld's instruction ("If you do that again, you'll have to go back to your egg."). Urd promised that they'd meet again when Skuld gained enough power. In the meanwhile, Skuld wore the angel egg mounted on a necklace. Some time later, Skuld threw together a device with the intent of boosting her powers to the point that she could control and regain Noble Scarlet. When said gadget went out of control, Urd used her angel to save Skuld, thus unlocking World Of Elegance, and also revealing the back story as to why Urd couldn't initially call her and why she had Scarlet's egg in the first place - Urd wanted to "try again" since she had believed that she had sealed her angel away forever at its own birth. Later on the promise is fulfilled when Skuld calls forth Noble Scarlet in the fight against the Angel Eater. At this time, Skuld had gained the necessary power to control the angel and the only thing lacking was the desire to truly be with her.

=== Debugging mallet ===
Skuld generally carries her debugging mallet, used against Yggdrasil bugs (eight-legged rabbit-looking entities), as a precaution wherever she goes. Yggdrasil bugs can cause adverse effects to the surrounding area such as making it snow on a single house and causing the holy steed Sleipnir to temporarily show up in the temple, and the only way to counter such effects is by debugging. One way to debug is through squishing the bugs with a mallet. Other ways include various gadgets Skuld has built, such as the Mr. Bug Zapper.

== Personality ==
Perper and Cornog described Skuld as being ""somewhat bratty" - a view that is in keeping with her behavior throughout the series. Skuld started as very defensive of Belldandy and interpreted anyone having any kind of intimate relationship with her as an attempt to steal Belldandy from her. She and Banpei repeatedly placed restrictions to limit Belldandy's and Keiichi's relationship. For a brief while it was also implied that Skuld had a crush on Keiichi; the second special episode of the first TV series (where she's grown up for a day) explored this angle by placing Skuld and Keiichi in situations where they appear as a couple. Over time ground rules have been worked out and there haven't been any recent episodes of relationship restriction enforcement.

Skuld also doesn't appear to get along with her oldest sister, Urd perhaps because Urd is somewhat the opposite of Belldandy. However, it is slowly revealed that Skuld and Urd share a complex love-hate relationship, and so even when they are gambling violently over rights to the television, it is obvious that they are "the very best of friends."

Being the inventor that she is, Skuld loves anything technical, but hates inefficiencies, flawed creations, and useless mechanics. This is Urd's favorite way of punishing Skuld whenever she touches or breaks any of Urd's potions and such, by making her create gadgets that do absolutely nothing useful. She has a tendency to get carried away fixing or improving anything she sees inefficient. Even when her original intention is to destroy it, she always ends up with something much better (usually more destructive). Most of her inventions, more often than not, have extra functions that make situations more complicated, including a self-destruct device in almost everything (including her Robot Wars robot...).

Like Chihiro Fujimi, Skuld has a weakness for cute things, albeit a different kind of cute. She squeals at things like plushies, cute animals and cute stuff, but also mechanical equipment and tools.
