= Wyrd =

Anglo-Saxon concept of personal fate or destiny

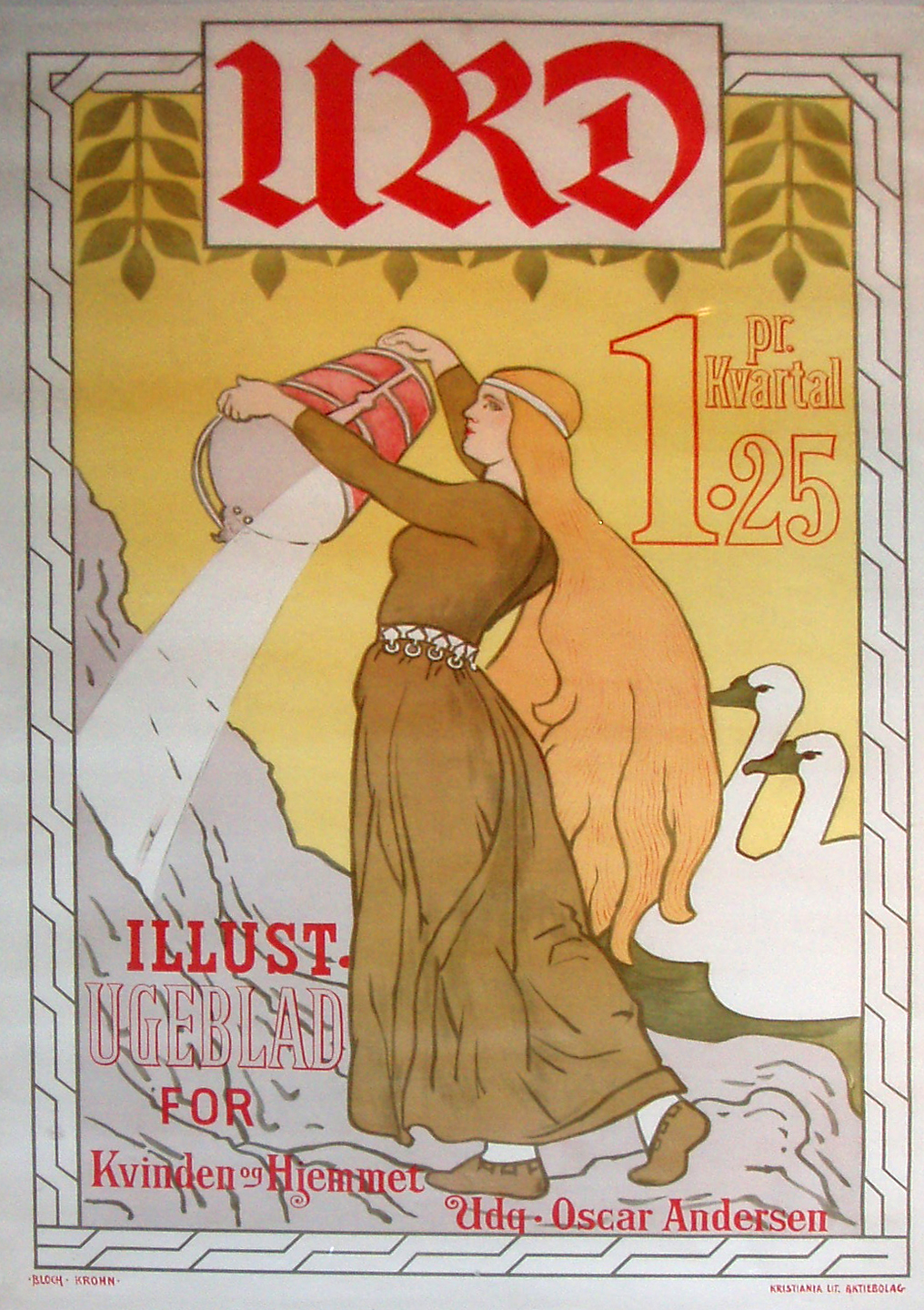
Poster for the Norwegian magazine Urd by Andreas Bloch and Olaf Krohn

Wyrd is a concept in Anglo-Saxon culture roughly corresponding to fate or personal destiny. The word is ancestral to Modern English weird, whose meaning has drifted towards an adjectival use with a more general sense of "supernatural" or "uncanny", or simply "unexpected".

The cognate term to wyrd in Old Norse is urðr, with a similar meaning, but also personified as a deity: Urðr (anglicized as Urd), one of the Norns in Norse mythology. The word also appears in the name of the well where the Norns meet, Urðarbrunnr.

== Etymology ==
The Old English term wyrd derives from a Proto-Germanic term *wurđíz. Wyrd has cognates in Old Saxon wurd, Old High German wurt, Old Norse urðr, Dutch worden (to become), and German werden. The Proto-Indo-European root is *wert- meaning 'to twist', which is related to Latin vertere 'turning, rotating', and in Proto-Germanic is *werþan- with a meaning 'to come to pass, to become, to be due'. The same root is also found in *weorþ, with the notion of 'origin' or 'worth' both in the sense of 'connotation, price, value' and 'affiliation, identity, esteem, honour and dignity'.

Wyrd is a noun formed from the Old English verb weorþan, meaning 'to come to pass, to become'. Adjectival use of wyrd developed in the 15th century, in the sense 'having the power to control destiny', originally in the name of the Weird Sisters (i.e. the classical Fates), who in the Elizabethan period became detached from their classical background and given an English personification as fays.

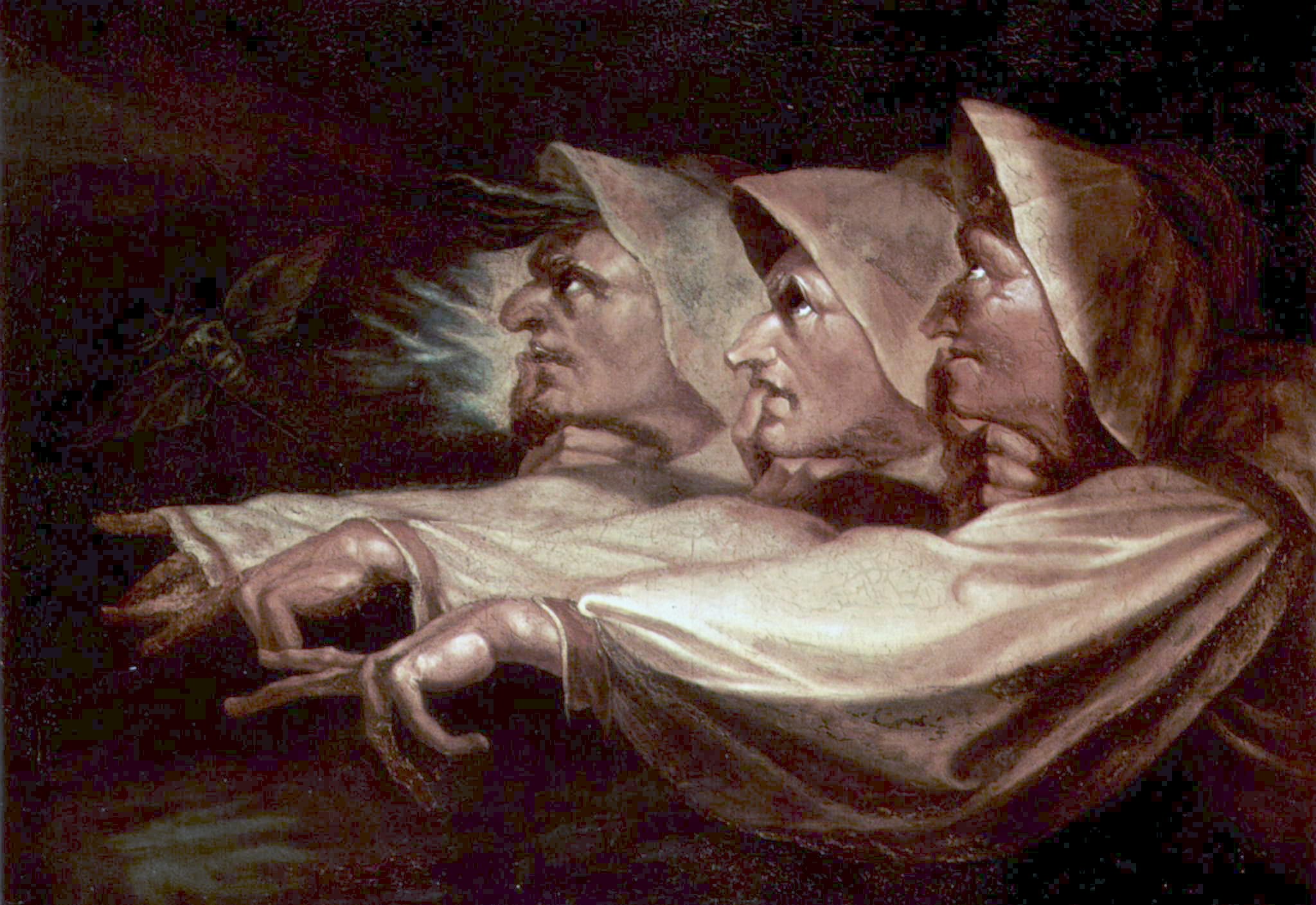
The Three Witches by Henry Fuseli (1783)

The weird sisters notably appear as the Three Witches in Shakespeare's Macbeth. To elucidate this, many editors of the play include a footnote associating the "Weird Sisters" with the Old English word wyrd or 'fate'.

The modern English usage actually developed from Scots, in which beginning in the 14th century, to weird was used as a verb with the sense of 'to preordain by decree of fate'. This use then gave rise to the early nineteenth century adjective meaning 'unearthly', which then developed into modern English weird.

The modern spelling weird first appeared in Scottish and Northern English dialects in the 16th century and was taken up in standard literary English starting in the 17th century. The regular form ought to have been wird, from Early Modern English werd. The replacement of werd by weird in the northern dialects is "difficult to account for".

The most common modern meaning of weird – 'odd, strange' – is first attested in 1815, originally with a connotation of the supernatural or portentous (especially in the collocation weird and wonderful), but by the early 20th century increasingly applied to everyday situations.

== Fate in Germanic mythology ==
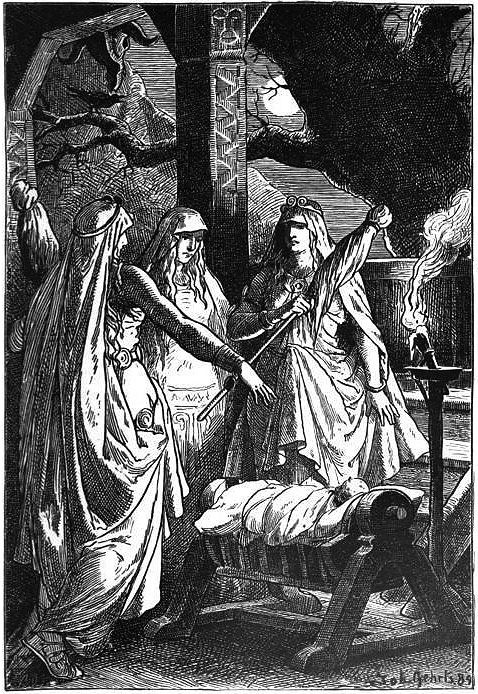
The Norns by Johannes Gehrts (1889)

According to J. Duncan Spaeth, "Wyrd (Norse Urd, one of the three Norns) is the Old English goddess of Fate, whom even Christianity could not entirely displace."

Wyrd is a feminine noun, and its Norse cognate urðr, besides meaning 'fate', is the name of one of the deities known as Norns. For this reason, Wyrd has been interpreted by some scholars as a pre-Christian goddess of fate. Other scholars deny a pagan signification of wyrd in the Old English period, but allow that wyrd may have been a deity in the pre-Christian period. In particular, some scholars argue that the three Norns are a late influence from the three Moirai in Greek and Roman mythology, who are goddesses of fate.

The names of the Norns are Urðr, Verðandi, and Skuld. Urðr means 'that which has come to pass', verðandi means "that which is in the process of happening" (it is the present participle of the verb cognate to weorþan), and skuld means 'debt' or 'guilt' (from a Germanic root *skul- 'to owe', also found in English should and shall).

Between themselves, the Norns weave fate or ørlǫg (from ór 'out, from, beyond' and lǫg 'law', and may be interpreted literally as 'beyond law'). According to Völuspá 20, the three Norns "set up the laws", "decided on the lives of the children of time" and "promulgate their ørlǫg". Frigg, on the other hand, while she "knows all ørlǫg", "says it not herself" (Lokasenna 30). Lawless that is "ørlǫglausa" occurs in Völuspá 17 in reference to driftwood, that is given breath, warmth and spirit by three gods, to create the first humans, Ask and Embla ('Ash' and possibly 'Elm' or 'Vine').

Mentions of wyrd in Old English literature include The Wanderer, "Wyrd bið ful aræd" ('Fate remains wholly inexorable') and Beowulf, "Gæð a wyrd swa hio scel!" ('Fate goes ever as she shall!'). In The Wanderer, wyrd is irrepressible and relentless. She or it "snatches the earls away from the joys of life," and "the wearied mind of man cannot withstand her" for her decrees "change all the world beneath the heavens".

== Other uses ==
The Wyrd Mons, a mountain on Venus, is named after an "Anglo-Saxon weaving goddess". Frank Herbert used the word "weird" in his science-fiction novel Dune to connote power, e.g. a martial art is referred to as "the Weirding Way", which takes place at the speed of thought. This was modified by director David Lynch, in his 1984 film version of the book, to become a system of sonic weapons called "weirding modules."

== See also ==
- Amor fati
- Beot
- Destiny
- Karma
- Predestination
- Predestination in Islam
- Moirai
- Ṛta
- Teotl
- Weaving (mythology)
