= Ah! My Goddess season 2 =

Anime series season

The cover of the first English DVD compilation released by ADV Films on May 8, 2007

Ah! My Goddess: Flights of Fancy, known in Japan as Ah! My Goddess: Everyone Has Wings (Sorezore no Tsubasa), is an anime television series directed by Hiroaki Gōda, animated by Anime International Company, and produced by Tokyo Broadcasting System (TBS). The episodes of the series are based on the manga series Oh My Goddess!, written and illustrated by Kōsuke Fujishima. Like its predecessor, the anime does not follow the manga chronologically. The plot covers adventures of Keiichi Morisato and Belldandy in the aftermath of the Lord of Terror fiasco.

It began broadcasting on TBS on April 6, 2006, and concluded its run on September 14, 2006, picking up the story from where the series left off in season one. Season two concluded with episode twenty-two, although the Japanese and North American DVD releases include episodes twenty-three and twenty-four. It was released to DVD in Japan between July 2006 and February 2007 by Bandai Visual. Media Blasters, who released the first season, passed up on this season and it was licensed to ADV Films instead for $516,000 The English dub was produced by NYAV Post, who had produced the dub for the first season. ADV Films released the season on six DVD compilations, each containing four episodes, between May and March 2007. The rights were later transferred to Funimation, who released a boxed set on November 25, 2007.

Three pieces of theme music were used throughout the series. The opening theme, titled "Shiawase no Iro" (幸せのいろ; Color of Happiness), was performed by Yoko Ishida. Ishida also performed the first ending theme "Bokura no Kiseki" (僕らのキセキ; Our Miracle). The second ending theme, starting from episode 12 onwards is "Koibito Doshi" (恋人同士; lit. 'Lovers') performed by Jyukai.

== Episode list ==
No. overall	No. in season	Title	Original release date
27	1	"Ah! I Wish...Once More!"; Transliteration: "Aa! Negai yo, Mō Ichido!" (Japanese: ああっ願いよ もう一度っ)	April 6, 2006
28	2	"Ah! The Beleaguered Queen of Vengeance!"; Transliteration: "Aa! Nayameru Fukushū no Joō-sama?" (Japanese: ああっ悩める復讐の女王さまっ)	April 13, 2006
29	3	"Ah! I Offer These Feelings on Christmas Eve!"; Transliteration: "Aa! Seiya ni Sasageru Kono Omoi!" (Japanese: ああっ聖夜に捧げるこの想いっ!)	April 20, 2006
30	4	"Ah! I Want To Fill The World With Happiness!"; Transliteration: "Aa! Sekai o Sachi de Mitashitai?" (Japanese: ああっ世界を幸で満たしたいっ)	April 27, 2006
31	5	"Ah! Well-Matched Vibes of Love!"; Transliteration: "Aa! Hikare Au Koi no Hachō?" (Japanese: ああっ惹かれあう恋の波長っ)	May 4, 2006
32	6	"Ah! Is That Jealousy?!"; Transliteration: "Aa! Sorette Shitto!?" (Japanese: ああっそれって嫉妬っ!?)	May 11, 2006
33	7	"Ah! I Shall Grant Your Wish!"; Transliteration: "Aa! Anata no Nozomi Kanaemasuwa!" (Japanese: ああっ貴方の望み叶えますわっ)	May 18, 2006
34	8	"Ah! I Want to Be of Use to You!"; Transliteration: "Aa! Anata no Yaku ni Tachitakute!" (Japanese: ああっあなたの役に立ちたくてっ)	May 25, 2006
35	9	"Ah! The Goddesses Go Head to Head on a Date!"; Transliteration: "Aa! Megami wa Dēto de Shōbu!" (Japanese: ああっ女神はデートで勝負っ)	June 1, 2006
36	10	"Ah! I Just Can't Say It!"; Transliteration: "Aa! Sono Hitokoto ga Ienakute!" (Japanese: ああっそのひとことが言えなくてっ)	June 8, 2006
37	11	"Ah! Grasp Your Dream With Your Own Hands!"; Transliteration: "Aa! Sono Te de Yume o Tsukamaete!" (Japanese: ああっその手で夢をつかまえてっ)	June 15, 2006
38	12	"Ah! A Goddess's Tears and His Dream!"; Transliteration: "Aa! Megami no Namida to Kare no Yume!" (Japanese: ああっ女神の涙と彼の夢っ)	June 22, 2006
39	13	"Ah! Let Those Feelings Awaken!"; Transliteration: "Aa! Mezamete?! Sono Kimochi!" (Japanese: ああっ目覚めてっ!その気持ちっ)	June 29, 2006
40	14	"Ah! My Darling Cupid!"; Transliteration: "Aa! Itoshiki Watashi no Kyūpitto?" (Japanese: ああっ愛しき私のキューピットっ)	July 6, 2006
41	15	"Ah! I'm Half Goddess, Half Demon?!"; Transliteration: "Aa! Megami to Akuma no Watashi?" (Japanese: ああっ女神と悪魔の私っ?)	July 13, 2006
42	16	"Ah! Shimmer Without Fear of the Darkness!"; Transliteration: "Aa! Yami o Osorezu Kagayaite?" (Japanese: ああっ闇を恐れず輝いてっ)	July 20, 2006
43	17	"Ah! The Chair of Demonkind Descends!"; Transliteration: "Aa! Daimakaichō-sama Kōrin?" (Japanese: ああっ大魔界長さまっ降臨っ)	July 27, 2006
44	18	"Ah! Do Demons Have Any Dignity?!"; Transliteration: "Aa! Mazoku no Ishin wa Arimasu ka?" (Japanese: ああっ魔属の威信はありますかっ?)	August 3, 2006
45	19	"Ah! The Love of a Goddess Saves the Ninja!"; Transliteration: "Aa! Megami no Ai wa Shinobi o sukuu!" (Japanese: ああっ女神の愛はシノビを救うっ)	August 10, 2006
46	20	"Ah! It Doesn't Matter Where, So Long as We're Together!"; Transliteration: "Aa! Donna Bashō de mo Futari Nara!" (Japanese: ああっどんな場所でも二人ならっ)	August 31, 2006
47	21	"Ah! Would It Be Okay If I Were a Demon?!"; Transliteration: "Aa! Watashi ga Mazoku demo Ii Desu ka?" (Japanese: ああっ私が魔属でもいいですかっ?)	September 7, 2006
48	22	"Ah! The Goddess's Confession!"; Transliteration: "Aa! Megami no Kokuhaku?" (Japanese: ああっ女神の告白っ)	September 14, 2006
49	23	"Ah! Everyone Has a Destiny!"; Transliteration: "Aa! Sorezore no Unmei" (Japanese: ああっそれぞれの運命っ)	February 23, 2007 (OVA)
50	24	"Ah! The Song of Love That Shakes the Heart!"; Transliteration: "Aa! Suki wa Kokoro o Yusaburu Uta" (Japanese: ああっ好きは心を揺さぶる歌っ)	February 23, 2007 (OVA)
