= List of Oh My Goddess! chapters =

The original Japanese cover of the first volume of Oh My Goddess, published by Kodansha on August 23, 1989

The chapters of the Japanese manga series Oh My Goddess! were written and illustrated by Kōsuke Fujishima and serialized in the seinen manga magazine Monthly Afternoon. The series premiered in September 1988 and finished after a 25-year run on April 25, 2014. The series followed the daily life of college student Keiichi Morisato, after his wish for a goddess to stay with him forever is granted by Belldandy and her two sisters.

Its 308 individual chapters were collected and published in forty-eight tankōbon volumes by Kodansha from August 23, 1989, to July 23, 2014. The series has been adapted into a five-episode original video animation (OVA) series released between February 1993 and May 1994; a 48-episode anime television series titled The Adventures of Mini-Goddess that featured super deformed versions of the characters; and a feature film released in 2000. In 2005, the manga was adapted into a second, 48-episode anime television series by Anime International Company that aired in Japan from January 2005 through September 2006. The series has also been adapted into a novel titled Oh My Goddess!: First End by Yumi Tōma, the voice of Urd, which was released by Kodansha on July 20, 2006; it was licensed in English by Dark Horse Comics and released on December 12, 2007.

Oh My Goddess! is licensed for an English-language release in North America by Dark Horse. The company initially published the first 112 chapters individually, with the first chapter released on August 1, 1994, and chapter 112 on September 1, 2004, until volume 19/20, after which they only published the collected volumes. They also serialized individual chapters in their defunct manga anthology, Super Manga Blast!. The first three volumes have had three different releases; they were initially published in a single abridged volume titled "1-555-GODDESS" on November 1, 1996, and were later re-released in unabridged volumes between June 5 and October 7, 2002. The first 129 chapters were redistributed between volumes 1 through 20 so that each volume better followed story arcs; after this reordering, the English release had 19 volumes. The fourth volume was released on October 15, 1997; volume 19, which Dark Horse numbered "19/20" and which ended on the same chapter as the Japanese volume 20, was released on January 19, 2005. After this release, they began republishing the first 20 volumes, this time following the Japanese chapter layout and using a new translation; they also continued publishing volumes from 21 on, these also followed the original Japanese chapter layout. The third re-release of volume 1 was on December 7, 2005, and the re-release was concluded with volume 20, which was released on February 22, 2012. Volume 21 was published by Dark Horse on July 6, 2005, and volume 48 was released on September 30, 2015. Editor Carl Gustav Horn noted Dark Horse's accelerated printing schedule of "new volumes every four months": when Dark Horse released volume 21 they were nine volumes behind Japan; at volume 41, they were only at four volumes behind; and that the English volume 44 was released five months after the Japanese release of volume 45, so he considered the publication caught up. In July 2014, Dark Horse Comics announced that they would release a fifteen-volume omnibus edition. The first volume was released on July 29, 2015. As of March 27, 2024, seven volumes have been released, covering the first 20 original volumes.

== Volume listing ==
=== Volumes 1–20 ===
| # | Japanese release date Japanese ISBN | Chapters | # | English | # | English Omnibus |
| # | English release date English ISBN | Chapters | # | Release date ISBN | # | Release date ISBN |
|---|---|---|---|---|---|---|
| 01 | August 23, 1989 978-4-06-321009-5 | 001. "Wrong Number" | 01 | June 5, 2002 978-1-56971-669-4 | 01 | July 29, 2015 978-1-61655-740-9 |
| 01 | December 7, 2005 978-1-59307-387-9 | 002. "Into the Lair of the Anime Otaku" | Volume title: Wrong Number | | | |
| | | 003. "A Man's Home Is His... Temple?" | Volume title: Wrong Number | | | |
| | | 004. "College Exchange... Goddess" | Volume title: Wrong Number | | | |
| | | 005. "Those Whom Goddess Has Joined Together, Let Not Woman Put Asunder" | Volume title: Wrong Number | | | |
| | | 006. "SLP Camera - Mission Accomplished!" | Volume title: Wrong Number | | | |
| | | 007. "The Lullaby of Love" | Volume title: Wrong Number | | | |
| | | 008. "The Megumi Problem" | Volume title: Wrong Number | | | |
| | | 009. "The Apartment Hunting Blues" | 02 | August 7, 2002 978-1-56971-764-6 | | |
| 02 | March 23, 1990 978-4-06-321013-2 | 010. "Naked Victory" | Volume title: Leader of the pack | | | |
| 02 | April 12, 2006 978-1-59307-457-9 | 011. "Let Flowers Bloom" | Volume title: Leader of the pack | | | |
| | | 012. "Leader of the Pack" | Volume title: Leader of the pack | | | |
| | | 013. "System Force Down" | Volume title: Leader of the pack | | | |
| | | 014. "Sexy Sister" | Volume title: Leader of the pack | | | |
| | | 015. "I'm the Campus Queen" | 03 | October 2, 2002 978-1-56971-765-3 | | |
| | | 016. "What Belldandy Wants Most" | Volume title: Final Exam | | | |
| 03 | September 22, 1990 978-4-06-321017-0 | 017. "Turkey With All the Trimmings..." | Volume title: Final Exam | | | |
| 03 | November 29, 2006 978-1-59307-539-2 | 018. "Life's Just a Game of 'Sugoroku Roulette'" | Volume title: Final Exam | | | |
| | | 019. "Final Exam" | Volume title: Final Exam | | | |
| | | 020. "Belldandy's Narrow Escape" | Volume title: Final Exam | | | |
| | | 021. "The Secret's Out!" | 04 | October 15, 1997 978-1-56971-252-8 | | |
| | | 022. "Winner Take All" | Volume title: Love Potion No. 9 | | | |
| | | 023. "What a Miracle" | Volume title: Love Potion No. 9 | | | |
| 04 | May 23, 1991 978-4-06-321021-7 | 024. "On a Wing and a Prayer" | Volume title: Love Potion No. 9 | | 02 | November 25, 2015 978-1-61655-784-3 |
| 04 | February 7, 2007 978-1-59307-623-8 | 025. "Love Potion No. 9" | Volume title: Love Potion No. 9 | | | |
| | | 026. "The CD from Hell" | Volume title: Love Potion No. 9 | | | |
| | | 027. "Mara Strikes Back!" | Volume title: Love Potion No. 9 | | | |
| | | 028. "The Scales of Love" | 05 | May 20, 1998 978-1-56971-329-7 | | |
| | | 029. "Sympathy for the Devil" | Volume title: Sympathy for the Devil | | | |
| | | 030. "Mystical Engine" | Volume title: Sympathy for the Devil | | | |
| 05 | October 23, 1991 978-4-06-321023-1 | 031. "Valentine Rhapsody" | Volume title: Sympathy for the Devil | | | |
| 05 | June 13, 2007 978-1-59307-708-2 | 032. "The Third Goddess" | Volume title: Sympathy for the Devil | | | |
| | | 033. "The Goddesses' Big Crisis" | Volume title: Sympathy for the Devil | | | |
| | | 034. "Urd Goes Berserk" | 06 | April 21, 1999 978-1-56971-369-3 | | |
| | | 035. "Urd's Terrible Master" | Volume title: Terrible Master Urd | | | |
| | | 036. "The Ultimate Destruction Program" | Volume title: Terrible Master Urd | | | |
| 06 | April 23, 1992 978-4-06-321025-5 | 037. "Urd Calls Forth the Beast" | Volume title: Terrible Master Urd | | | |
| 06 | September 5, 2007 978-1-59307-772-3 | 038. "The Secret of the Lord of Terror" | Volume title: Terrible Master Urd | | | |
| | | 039. "Confession" | Volume title: Terrible Master Urd | | | |
| | | 040. "Robot Wars" | 07 | November 24, 1999 978-1-56971-431-7 | | |
| | | 041. "The Trials of Morisato, Part 1" | Volume title: The Queen of Vengeance | | | |
| | | 042. "The Trials of Morisato, Part 2: Urd's Fantastic Adventure" | Volume title: The Queen of Vengeance | | | |
| 07 | October 23, 1992 978-4-06-321028-6 | 043. "The Trials of Morisato, Part 3: Belldandy's Tempestuous Heart" | Volume title: The Queen of Vengeance | | 03 | March 16, 2016 978-1-61655-895-6 |
| 07 | December 19, 2007 978-1-59307-850-8 | 044. "The Queen of Vengeance" | Volume title: The Queen of Vengeance | | | |
| | | 045. "Mister Unhappy" | 08 | April 12, 2000 978-1-56971-449-2 | | |
| | | 046. "Thank You" | Volume title: Mara Strikes Back! | | | |
| | | 047. "Good-bye and Hello" | Volume title: Mara Strikes Back! | | | |
| 08 | March 23, 1993 978-4-06-321030-9 | 048. "The Forgotten Promise" | Volume title: Mara Strikes Back! | | | |
| 08 | April 9, 2008 978-1-59307-889-8 | 049. "The Lunchbox of Love" | Volume title: Mara Strikes Back! | | | |
| | | 050. "Meet Me By the Seashore" | 09 | October 25, 2000 978-1-56971-474-4 | | |
| | | 051. "You're So Bad" | Volume title: Ninja Master | | | |
| | | 052. "Ninja Master" | Volume title: Ninja Master | | | |
| 09 | November 22, 1993 978-4-06-321037-8 | 053. "Law of the Ninja" | Volume title: Ninja Master | | | |
| 09 | June 25, 2008 978-1-59307-970-3 | 054. "Together for Never" | 10 | February 14, 2001 978-1-56971-522-2 | | |
| | | 055. "Jealous Love" | Volume title: Miss Keiichi | | | |
| | | 056. "It's Lonely At the Top" | Volume title: Miss Keiichi | | | |
| | | 057. "Fallen Angel" | Volume title: Miss Keiichi | | | |
| 10 | May 23, 1994 978-4-06-321040-8 | 058. "Play the Game" | Volume title: Miss Keiichi | | 04 | July 27, 2016 978-1-5067-0052-6 |
| 10 | November 12, 2008 978-1-59582-190-4 | 059. "Sorrow, Fear Not" | Volume title: Miss Keiichi | | | |
| | | 060. "Karaoke Hell" | 11 | June 20, 2001 978-1-56971-540-6 | | |
| | | 061. "Evil Spirits: 200 Proof" | Volume title: The Devil in Miss Urd | | | |
| | | 062. "Skuld Strikes Back!" | Volume title: The Devil in Miss Urd | | | |
| 11 | October 21, 1994 978-4-06-321044-6 | 063. "The Battle for Urd" | Volume title: The Devil in Miss Urd | | | |
| 11 | February 25, 2009 978-1-59582-254-3 | 064. "Shadow & Light" | Volume title: The Devil in Miss Urd | | | |
| | | 065. "SuperUrd" | Volume title: The Devil in Miss Urd | | | |
| | | 066. "Fourth Time's a Charmer" | 12 | October 17, 2001 978-1-56971-551-2 | | |
| | | 067. "I'll Do Anything For You" | Volume title: The Fourth Goddess | | | |
| 12 | June 23, 1995 978-4-06-321049-1 | 068. "The Battle For Keiichi" | Volume title: The Fourth Goddess | | | |
| 12 | June 24, 2009 978-1-59582-322-9 | 069. "The Dating Game" | Volume title: The Fourth Goddess | | | |
| | | 070. "When a Man Loves a Woman" | Volume title: The Fourth Goddess | | | |
| | | 071. "A Goddess Never Forgets" | Volume title: The Fourth Goddess | | | |
| | | 072. "Men Are From Earth, Goddesses Are From Yggdrasil" | Volume title: The Fourth Goddess | | | |
| 13 | April 23, 1996 978-4-06-321057-6 | 073. "Childhood's End" | 13 | March 13, 2002 978-1-56971-685-4 | 05 | November 30, 2016 978-1-5067-0093-9 |
| 13 | October 28, 2009 978-1-59582-386-1 | 074. "Crazy Little Thing Called Love" | Volume title: Childhood's End | | | |
| | | 075. "The Queen and the Goddess" | Volume title: Childhood's End | | | |
| | | 076. "Hail to the Chief" | Volume title: Childhood's End | | | |
| | | 077. "Forever Grrls" | Volume title: Childhood's End | | | |
| 14 | April 23, 1997 978-4-06-321067-5 | 078. "Live to Work, Work to Live!" | Volume title: Childhood's End | | | |
| 14 | February 24, 2010 978-1-59582-455-4 | 079. "Pretty in Scarlet" | 14 | November 6, 2002 978-1-56971-766-0 | | |
| | | 080. "The Goddess's Apprentice" | Volume title: Queen Sayoko | | | |
| | | 081. "Call Me Queen" | Volume title: Queen Sayoko | | | |
| | | 082. "And Then There Was One" | Volume title: Queen Sayoko | | | |
| 15 | September 22, 1997 978-4-06-321074-3 | 083. "Sayoko or Bust" | Volume title: Queen Sayoko | | | |
| 15 | September 1, 2010 978-1-59582-524-7 | 084. "At Sayoko's Side" | Volume title: Queen Sayoko | | | |
| | | 085. "Back Where You Belong" | Volume title: Queen Sayoko | | | |
| | | 086. "Megumi Versus the Queen" | 15 | February 5, 2003 978-1-56971-921-3 | | |
| | | 087. "The Secret of Speed" | Volume title: Hand in Hand | | | |
| | | 088. "Two Hearts Beat as One" | Volume title: Hand in Hand | | | |
| | | 089. "Another Me" | Volume title: Hand in Hand | | | |
| | | 090. "Never Let Go" | Volume title: Hand in Hand | | 06 | October 11, 2017 978-1-5067-0532-3 |
| 16 | November 21, 1997 978-4-06-321076-7 | 091. "I Wanna Hold Your Hand" | Volume title: Hand in Hand | | | |
| 16 | December 22, 2010 978-1-59582-594-0 | 092. "Welcome" | Volume title: Hand in Hand | | | |
| | | 093. "The Sorrows of Banpei" | Volume title: Hand in Hand | | | |
| | | 094. "The Boy Who Could See Goddesses" | 16 | May 14, 2003 978-1-56971-950-3 | | |
| | | 095. "The Beginning of the End" | Volume title: Mystery Child | | | |
| | | 096. "Memories of a Youth" | Volume title: Mystery Child | | | |
| | | 097. "Return of the Goddess" | Volume title: Mystery Child | | | |
| 17 | September 22, 1998 978-4-06-321091-0 | 098. "Light and Shadow" | Volume title: Mystery Child | | | |
| 17 | March 16, 2011 978-1-59582-691-6 | 099. "The Trouble With Doublets" | Volume title: Mystery Child | | | |
| | | 100. "Time Without End, Hope Without End" | Volume title: Mystery Child | | | |
| | | 101. "Turn Back, Oh Time" | Volume title: Mystery Child | | | |
| | | 102. "Come Walk With Me" | 17 | November 19, 2003 978-1-56971-986-2 | | |
| | | 103. "Getting to Know You" | Volume title: Traveler | | | |
| | | 104. "Almost My Hero" | Volume title: Traveler | | | |
| 18 | November 20, 1998 978-4-06-321093-4 | 105. "Unlicensed Goddess" | Volume title: Traveler | | 07 | March 27, 2024 978-1-5067-3467-5 |
| 18 | June 29, 2011 978-1-59582-749-4 | 106. "Wide, Wider, Widest" | Volume title: Traveler | | | |
| | | 107. "As Long As You're With Me..." | Volume title: Traveler | | | |
| | | 108. "Traveler" | Volume title: Traveler | | | |
| | | 109. "Missing Time" | Volume title: Traveler | | | |
| | | 110. "The Ghost of the Pass" | 18 | May 19, 2004 978-1-59307-217-9 | | |
| | | 111. "Sightings" | Volume title: The Phantom Racer | | | |
| | | 112. "Three of a Perfect Pair" | Volume title: The Phantom Racer | | | |
| 19 | September 22, 1999 978-4-06-314219-8 | 113. "Welcome Back" | Volume title: The Phantom Racer | | | |
| 19 | October 26, 2011 978-1-59582-815-6 | 114. "Meet Doctor Moreau" | Volume title: The Phantom Racer | | | |
| | | 115. "Android Dreams" | Volume title: The Phantom Racer | | | |
| | | 116. "The Trap of Doctor Moreau!" | Volume title: The Phantom Racer | | | |
| | | 117. "Man? Machine?" | Volume title: The Phantom Racer | | | |
| | | 118. "The Sign of Life" | Volume title: The Phantom Racer | | | |
| | | 119. "I Choose You, Sora!" | 19/20 | January 19, 2005 978-1-59307-316-9 | | |
| | | 120. "The Shortcut to Winning" | Volume title: Sora Unchained | | | |
| 20 | November 22, 1999 978-4-06-314222-8 | 121. "The Director's Curse!" | Volume title: Sora Unchained | | | |
| 20 | February 22, 2012 978-1-59582-901-6 | 122. "Special Training" | Volume title: Sora Unchained | | | |
| | | 123. "Drive" | Volume title: Sora Unchained | | | |
| | | 124. "Miles and Miles" | Volume title: Sora Unchained | | | |
| | | 125. "The Race Gets Hot, a Goddess Gets Hotter!" | Volume title: Sora Unchained | | | |
| | | 126. "Wrecked by a Kiss" | Volume title: Sora Unchained | | | |
| | | 127. "The Best Magic" | Volume title: Sora Unchained | | | |
| | | 128. "The Endless Battle, Part One" | Volume title: Sora Unchained | | | |
| | | 129. "The Endless Battle, Part Two" | Volume title: Sora Unchained | | | |

=== Volumes 21–40 ===
| No. | Original release date | Original ISBN | English release date | English ISBN |
|---|---|---|---|---|
| 21 | June 22, 2000 | 978-4-06-321114-6 | July 6, 2005 | 978-1-59307-334-3 |
130. "The Devil Inside"; 131. "Go Your Own Way"; 132. "A Goddess Never Forgets"; 133. "The Cat That Stretched"; 134. "The Final Option"; 135. "She's A Devil Woman"
| 22 | October 23, 2000 | 978-4-06-321118-4 | January 25, 2006 | 978-1-59307-400-5 |
136. "Let's Make A Deal"; 137. "Sister Act"; 138. "Maybe...?"; 139. "Wicked Game"; 140. "Morisato Residence, Rooms to Let"; 141. "Sparkle in Her Eyes"
| 23 | October 23, 2001 | 978-4-06-321129-0 | June 7, 2006 | 978-1-59307-463-0 |
142. "Bell and Keiichi and the Terrible Guest"; 143. "Dad on the Run"; 144. "Garden of the Goddesses"; 145. "Dad in Hell"; 146. "Moment of Decision"; 147. "Mother's Battle, Father's Battle"; 148. "Let's Dance"
| 24 | May 23, 2002 | 978-4-06-321136-8 | December 27, 2006 | 978-1-59307-545-3 |
149. "Running Dialogue"; 150. "The Path of Belief"; 151. "Prepared to Win, Prepared to Lose"; 152. "The Real You"; 153. "The Hot Springs Episode"; 154. "I Dub Thee, Yufuin"; 155. "Fighting Wings"
| 25 | November 15, 2002 | 978-4-06-321142-9 | February 28, 2007 | 978-1-59307-644-3 |
156. "Battle and Joy"; 157. "A Dance of Feathers"; 158. "The One-Winged Angel"; 159. "Devil of a Plot"; 160. "What Times Demand"; 161. "Binary Wings"; 162. "Goddess of the Ax"
| 26 | June 23, 2003 | 978-4-06-321150-4 | April 18, 2007 | 978-1-59307-715-0 |
163. "Flight of the Fighting Wings"; 164. "Pleasure and Duty"; 165. "With the Binary Angels"; 166. "To Call You Friend"; 167. "Inside Belldandy"; 168. "Landscape With Angels"; 169. "What We Would Save"
| 27 | November 21, 2003 | 978-4-06-321154-2 | October 10, 2007 | 978-1-59307-788-4 |
170. "The Great Earth Search"; 171. "Kiss Me Goodbye"; 172. "Shoot or Die!"; 173. "Horseshoes and Handgrenades"; 174. "Is Here She?"; 175. "That Flying Entity"; 176. "Sign of Gratitude"
| 28 | March 23, 2004 | 978-4-06-321158-0 | January 30, 2008 | 978-1-59307-857-7 |
177. "Little Voice, Great Sorrow"; 178. "Those Who Guard and Those Who Plunder"; 179. "What Can I Do For You"; 180. "The Polka-Dotted Cat and the Magic Broom"; 181. "Fastest Broom, Greatest Race!"; 182. "Courage and Trial"
| 29 | September 6, 2004 | 978-4-06-321163-4 | May 7, 2008 | 978-1-59307-912-3 |
183. "The Barriers That Bind"; 184. "Heaven and Hell"; 185. "Beautiful Name"; 186. "Wanted"; 187. "The Path To First-Class Goddess"; 188. "The Power of a First-Class Goddess"
| 30 | November 22, 2004 | 978-4-06-321166-5 | August 20, 2008 | 978-1-59307-979-6 |
189. "Happy! Happy?"; 190. "The Herald of Happiness"; 191. "Rain & Happiness, Cause & Effect"; 192. "For Whose Sake a First Class Goddess?"; 193. "Important Words"; 194. "Love Overflowing"
| 31 | September 21, 2005 | 978-4-06-321169-6 | January 7, 2009 | 978-1-59582-233-8 |
195. "Love You to Death"; 196. "Return to Base"; 197. "The Forbidden Gate?!"; 198. "Gotcha? Gotcha!"; 199. "A Goddess's Duty"; 200. "I Open Just for You"
| 32 | December 22, 2005 | 978-4-06-321173-3 | April 29, 2009 | 978-1-59582-303-8 |
201. "Let's Meet Again"; 202. "Paradise On Earth"; 203. "First Encounter"; 204. "The Sound That Reaches; The Sound That Doesn't"; 205. "Grand Showdown"; 206. "Festival"
| 33 | July 21, 2006 | 978-4-06-321177-1 | August 26, 2009 | 978-1-59582-376-2 |
207. "The Thing I Want to Make"; 208. "A New Door"; 209. "Debut"; 210. "A Journey's Opening Cheer"; 211. "Goddess Dash"; 212. "The Wind We Feel Together"
| 34 | November 22, 2006 | 978-4-06-321180-1 | January 20, 2010 | 978-1-59582-448-6 |
213. "Happiness, Three Times Faster"; 214. "Engine Of Happiness"; 215. "Happy Monkey Generations"; 216. "For Your Sake I'll Fly-y-y"; 217. "My Important Words, Your Cool and Clear Future"; 218. "A Goddess's Divine Protection"
| 35 | June 22, 2007 | 978-4-06-321185-6 | May 19, 2010 | 978-1-59582-509-4 |
219. "To a Higher Place!"; 220. "The Goddess Beyond The Lens"; 221. "Camera Talk"; 222. "Camera's Memories"; 223. "The Flower Can Continue To Bloom"; 224. "Drunken Queen"
| 36 | December 21, 2007 | 978-4-06-321186-3 | September 29, 2010 | 978-1-59582-581-0 |
225. "And Then, Oblivion"; 226. "Temporarily-Named Great Detective's Reasoning"; 227. "Why Does My Heart Throb So!?"; 228. "Overwritten Coupling"; 229. "Revealing The Truth"; 230. "Those Words, Again"
| 37 | July 23, 2008 | 978-4-06-321188-7 | February 02, 2011 | 978-1-59582-660-2 |
231. "The Maid From the Sky"; 232. "The Melancholy of a Clumsy Goddess"; 233. "A World Without Sound"; 234. "Change of Tone"; 235. "An Increase in the Propagation of Errors"; 236. "Hard Work"
| 38 | December 22, 2008 | 978-4-06-321190-0 | April 27, 2011 | 978-1-59582-711-1 |
237. "Where the Main Theme Fled To"; 238. "Chrono's Dance Performance"; 239. "Goddesses First Class Don't Lie"; 240. "Revolt"; 241. "Birth!!"; 242. "Emergency Request!!"
Keiichi and the Goddesses return home to find the program has settled in Velsper, the demonic cat. Chrono must defeat Velsper but she is frightened because she was traumatized by a cat when she was younger. After some encouragement, she fights Velsper with martial arts, enabling Belldandy to restore the program. Chrono returns home a bit embarrassed that she was conned into wearing a maid uniform. Later, Hild is surprised by an attack by demoness Hagal. Keiichi and Chihiro get a visit from Megumi who wants Keiichi to buy her a cute little motorbike as it is Keiichi's birthday. Belldandy, meanwhile, has bought a watch for Keiichi. They are about to celebrate when Hild suddenly drops in and destroys Whirlwind.
| 39 | July 23, 2009 | 978-4-06-321191-7 | August 31, 2011 | 978-1-59582-795-1 |
243. "Let Me Grant Your Wish"; 244. "The Closing World"; 245. "Risking All"; 246. "The Gates of Hell"; 247. "Three Goddesses, Three Demons"; 248. "1/1,000,000 Crystallization"; 249. "The Benefits of Misunderstanding"
Hagal has taken over Hell, and immediately sets out to grant people's wishes with unexpected results, leaving Hild with no choice but to ask the Goddesses for help to restore the balance between good and evil. Peorth and Lind head off to Earth in response to the worldwide chaos. Keiichi asks to come along. Peorth and Lind surprise Skuld and they practically destroy the home again when Hild "borrows" Skuld and some of the wish-fulfilling demons appear. Hild and the Goddess sisters strategize on how to defeat Hagal and then plan to use a gate to transport everyone by the power of three demons: herself, Velsper, and Marller. Peorth and Lind arrive and briefly attack Hild but learn of the situation and lend their support by staying at Earth. The demon trio opens up the gate.
| 40 | November 20, 2009 | 978-4-06-321193-1 | December 28, 2011 | 978-1-59582-870-5 |
250. "Kiss of Demonkind"; 251. "Upon Glühende Herz"; 252. "True Darkness"; 253. "Melting into Darkness"; 254. "Darkness, Shaken"
Hild has given Keiichi a kiss, which makes Belldandy a little jealous that she inadvertently summons a tornado that flings away Hagal's monster minions. Hild then sends Keiichi and the Goddess sisters off. Keiichi rides Glühende Herz while the sisters follow, and they arrive at the first gate of hell where they see a doorbell. Keiichi, Urd, and Skuld think it's a trap, but Belldandy pushes the doorbell anyway, and a girl greets them and escorts them down a narrow walkway (the abyss to each side) to the next door. She states how they must face various trials to get a key to unlock the next room. She gives Keiichi the first key for free. Keiichi opens it and they face a girl who specializes in darkness magic. The girl is able to beat Urd and Skuld, but Keiichi realizes the girl uses echo-location like a bat and tries some ideas such as shouting to fight her off. Belldandy summons a tornado and tries to counter her sound magic with her own.

=== Volumes 41–48 ===
| No. | Original release date | Original ISBN | English release date | English ISBN |
|---|---|---|---|---|
| 41 | July 23, 2010 | 978-4-06-321194-8 | April 25, 2012 | 978-1-59582-891-0 |
255. "Dividing the Darkness"; 256. "A Vista"; 257. "Fist of the Demon"; 258. "Invincible Thrym"; 259. "Invitation to Sleep"; 260. "Creative Destruction"; 261. "The Limits of Strength"
| 42 | February 23, 2011 | 978-4-06-321195-5 | August 29, 2012 | 978-1-59582-892-7 |
262. "An Emergency?!"; 263. "The Law of Aesthetics"; 264. "Magic Cancellation"; 265. "The Power of Love - Mecha Charge!!"; 266. "Counter-Attack Shavings"; 267. "Mecha Soul Explosion!!"; 268. "Are You Ready?"
| 43 | September 22, 2011 | 978-4-06-358346-5 | December 19, 2012 | 978-1-61655-082-0 |
269. "Quick Exit Contest!!"; 270. "The Curse of the Door"; 271. "Energy Draining Away"; 272. "I Will Do It For You"; 273. "Only That Person"; 274. "The Meeting That Must be Seen!"; 275. "At the Moment of Loss"
| 44 | April 24, 2012 | 978-4-06-321197-9 | April 10, 2013 | 978-1-61655-131-5 |
276. "Full Demon Urd"; 277. "That Which Should be There"; 278. "Flowers Bloom in Demon World"; 279. "The CEO's Responsibility"; 280. "Demonism out of Control"; 281. "Sisterly Ties"; 282. "One for the Little One"
Urd taps into her demonic power to destroy the device that sucks the goddess powers away, however, she goes out of control, so she asks Skuld to stop her. Meanwhile, Hagal tries to tap the rest of Belldandy's energy. Keiichi realizes that his missing limbs are actually an illusion. Belldandy asks Keiichi to terminate their contract and start a new one in which he is to unite with Belldandy under the condition that he accept all trials. They execute the contract with an oath kiss, which floods the area with flowers. Hagal tries to stop them but Keiichi blows the tiny avatar of Hild into her ear, allowing her to control Hagal and force her to make a statement that frees Hild and restores her position. After Urd blasts into the demon room with the two demon sisters, Skuld sets an anti-proton bomb to go off, and dares Urd to do something about it. Urd manages to contain the explosion, and returns to normal.
| 45 | November 22, 2012 | 978-4-06-321198-6 | November 20, 2013 | 978-1-61655-298-5 |
283. "Hagal's Confession"; 284. "The Destiny of a Demon World CEO"; 285. "Kiss of Truth"; 286. "The Interracial Romance Inquisition System"; 287. "Judgment Gate"; 288. "The Meaning of Trust"; 289. "The Choice"
Hagal explains her actions: she was worried that Hild was going to die when her term as CEO expires. However, Hild takes advantage of a loophole where, if her power is usurped and she reclaims it, her term is reset. Hild notices that Belldandy has given Keiichi the Kiss of Truth, which, coupled with her changed contract, unlocks Keiichi's sealed sexual desires for Belldandy. This causes a situation where Ansuz, the Interracial Romance Inquisitor and Belldandy's mother, arrives. She puts Keiichi and Belldandy to a trial where they are to enter a Judgment Gate to prove their relationship. When Keiichi enters, he becomes a guy by a lake where he is confronted with a puzzle of choosing between two harps.
| 46 | August 23, 2013 | 978-4-06-321199-3 | August 6, 2014 | 978-1-61655-433-0 |
290. "What the Eye Sees"; 291. "Visions I Want You to See, Music I Want You to Hear"; 292. "Onward, to That Place Beyond"; 293. "Beyond That Ocean Yet Unseen"; 294. "Determination towards Determination"; 295. "The CEO of Heaven's Barrier"; 296. "The First Challenge"
Belldandy and Keiichi learn that the man and the Goddess of the Lake were in love just like they were, but she fell from grace out of despair after the inevitable death of her loved one. Together, Belldandy and Keiichi change the tragic fate of the goddess, clearing the first part of the trial.
| 47 | March 21, 2014 | 978-4-06-321201-3 | March 11, 2015 | 978-1-61655-733-1 |
297. "The Magic of Encouragement!"; 298. "Countdown of Life"; 299. "Between Life and Death"; 300. "Their Piled Up Feelings Create a Miracle"; 301. "Last Stage"; 302. "After the Triumph"; 303. "A Spell for Love"
Belldandy's father, possessing the body of a gateway, appears before Keiichi and reveals that to complete the second part of the trial, he must clear and intricate race track with an exact replica of his motorcycle, thus "creating a miracle" by his own power. After being saved from falling to the death by Belldandy, Keiichi is assisted by the Goddess of the Lake in gratitude for their help and clears the track.
| 48 | July 23, 2014 | 978-4-06-358706-7 | September 30, 2015 | 978-1-61655-855-0 |
304. "Divine Certification"; 305. "Back to Regular Life"; 306. "Stop Time"; 307. "The amazing pair left on the surface"; 308. "I Want to Stay By Your Side Forever"
Having successfully completed the trials, Belldandy and Keiichi are finally allowed to live as a couple, and after receiving the blessings of her parents, rush against time to return with Urd and Skuld, before the gateway closes and traps them in Hell, while Peorth and Lind struggle to keep it open. Once reunited at the Human World, the Goddesses, with Hild and Mara as witnesses, celebrate Belldandy and Keiichi's wedding.
