= Belldandy =

Female protagonist in Oh My Goddess!

- Oh My Goddess! character
- Belldandy and her Angel Holy Bell
- First appearance: Chapter 1
- Created by: Kōsuke Fujishima
- Voiced by: Japanese Kikuko Inoue; Akemi Okamura (Mini-Goddess eps 1-13); Yumi Tōma (Young Belldandy in OVA); Mio Shionoiri (Young Belldandy in movie) English Juliet Cesario (OVA); Bridget Hoffman (Movie, Mini-Goddess); Chloe Thornton (Young Belldandy in Movie); Eileen Stevens (TV)

In-universe information
- Species: Goddess
- Gender: Female
- Spouse: Keiichi Morisato
- Relatives: Urd (half-sister); Skuld (sister); Tyr (father); Ansuz (mother)
- Rank: First class, second category, unlimited license, Valkyrie License
- Dimension: 10th (Yggdrasil)
- Elemental Affinity: Wind, Air
- Angel: Holy Bell, Blue Lance (temporary)

Belldandy (ベルダンディー, Berudandī; transliterated: Verðandi (Old Norse), meaning "Norn of the Present") is a fictional character in the popular anime and manga series Oh My Goddess!. She was created by Kōsuke Fujishima as one of three Goddesses who come to Earth to reside with Keiichi Morisato, and she serves as his love interest. She is depicted as a beautiful and powerful young woman, with strong nurturing tendencies, a trusting and innocent character, and an extremely kind heart. Belldandy is accidentally summoned from heaven by Keiichi in order to grant him a wish and stays when Keiichi wishes for "a goddess like you to be by my side forever". The stories follow Belldandy as she builds a relationship with Keiichi, using her powers (which include teleportation, telekinesis, telepathy, and levitation) to help both Keiichi and his friends while keeping her true identity a secret.

Her first appearance was in Kodansha's Monthly Afternoon magazine in September 1988. Belldandy has also featured in a novel, two TV series, a movie, and three OVA series. The character has gained considerable respect throughout the various formats, as evidenced by her appearance as one of the most popular characters in the Newtype and Animage polls. The concept of Belldandy draws loosely from Norse mythology, with "Belldandy" being a transliteration of the Old Norse Verðandi, one of a trio of Norns. She is joined by characters representing the other two of the trio of Norns—her sisters Urd and Skuld.

Belldandy is regarded by commentators as an example of the magical girlfriend character, and comparisons have been drawn with the characters of Samantha from Bewitched and Jeannie from I Dream of Jeannie. The character's very conservative nature, however, which almost completely subordinates her to her husband, Keiichi, has led to some concerns from Western critics and has polarized Western audiences despite relatively steady popularity among Japanese audiences.

== Creation and conception ==
Miyuki (Taiho Shichauzo) as Fujishima's original Goddess

Belldandy was created by Kōsuke Fujishima and features as one of the two principal protagonists in the manga Ah! My Goddess! (along with the character of Keiichi Morisato). Her first appearance was in Kodansha's seinen manga magazine Monthly Afternoon in September 1988, but she has also been depicted in a novel (Ah! My Goddess: First End), three anime series—Oh My Goddess! (OVA), Ah! My Goddess and The Adventures of Mini-Goddess—and in Ah! My Goddess: The Movie.

Belldandy's original concept was loosely based on a depiction of Miyuki Kobayakawa, one of the main characters of You're Under Arrest, which was also created by Kosuke Fujishima. Miyuki was featured as a goddess in an advertisement for a You're Under Arrest T-shirt giveaway and appeared as a goddess character in a "four panel gag strip" in the You're Under Arrest manga, leading to claims that Oh My Goddess is a spin-off series. The character Ken Nakajima from You're Under Arrest appears in the first episode of the original OVA. He is driving the car that Keiichi almost hits with his motorcycle.

=== Norse origins ===
Fujishima was particularly interested in the concept of a goddess "as a job", and turned to Norse mythology as he felt that it was relatively unknown in Japan. Thus Belldandy is based on Verðandi (or Verthandi), the Norse Goddess of the present, (whose name is literally translated as "to become" or "becoming"), and she is one of the three Norns or "fates" from Norse mythology. Verdandi, when translated into Japanese, becomes ベルダンディー (Berudandī). As the Japanese phonetic system does not distinguish between "b" and "v" or "r" and "l" (although ヴ can describe "v".), "Belldandy" can emerge as a product of consonant substitutions. Indeed, it was in the first chapter of the manga that her name was transliterated as Belldandy rather than Verdandi, and this romanization has stuck since. When the English translations were being prepared, Toren Smith considered returning the name to "Verthandi", (which Smith had determined to be the correct translation of the Old Norse), but chose to stick with Belldandy on the grounds that Fujishima was already "playing fast and loose with the mythos" and thus felt that no further harm was likely to come from employing Fujishima's transliteration. (Nevertheless, in the Swedish translation of the manga, released in 2007, her name was returned to Verdandi).

== Character outline ==
=== Background ===
Belldandy is depicted as being a Goddess working with the fictional "Goddess Relief Agency". Although the series never specifically mentions her age, there are hints that she is between 18 and 28 when the series begins: in the original manga her birthdate is shown as NOT KNOWN—the English translation offers no year, but simply says "UNKNOWN"—while in the anime the more specific 1985/01/01 is employed. This should not be seen as conclusive as Eileen Stevens, who provides the voice of Belldandy in the English-language version of the TV series, states that while Belldandy is "young in appearance, late teens to early 20s, she's ageless, perhaps thousands of years old." This is supported in-universe, in the manga, when Peorth mentions that gods and demons are essentially immortal, ageless beings - but they'll never forget those they meet.

Fujishima provided the character with two sisters—Skuld and Urd—each with notably different personalities from her own. These two sisters represent the other two Norns from Norse mythology, with Urd (the eldest of the three) representing the past while Skuld (the youngest) represents the future. In recent volumes, Fujishima revealed the identity of Skuld and Belldandy's mother, a goddess named Ansuz (アンザス, Anzasu), who seems to have a rivalry with Hild, Urd's mother.

When the series begins, Belldandy is working on the "Goddess Technical Helpline", also known as "Goddess Relief Office / Agency"" and is responsible for granting wishes to those who call. As such, her role is similar to the character Peorth's work at the Earth Assistance Agency. In spite of working for Heaven, Belldandy, unlike her two sisters, does not appear to play a significant role in maintaining Yggdrasil.

=== Personality ===
The "magical girl" character, of which Belldandy is an example, typically combines powerful abilities with very feminine characteristics. For Western audiences, a comparison can be drawn with the characters of Samantha Stephens from Bewitched and Jeannie from I Dream of Jeannie. As such, Belldandy is depicted as being very sweet and exceptionally kind-hearted, with very "old-fashioned" sensibilities. Combined with domestic skills portrayed through the series and her loyalty to Keiichi, this makes her a classic example of the concept of Yamato Nadeshiko. As a slight departure from the concept though, Belldandy can be highly competitive, be it in a race where she's Keiichi's co-pilot, or on those rare cases where she competes against him, as seen during Sora Hasegawa's nomination as the auto club's president.

Belldandy is exceptionally kind-hearted, even for a goddess. She can easily sense other people's emotions and tries her best to be empathetic to all those around her, displaying a combination of "serene beauty and acceptance". She rarely holds a grudge and is always willing to forgive anyone who does injury to her, unless Keiichi is involved. Even though Belldandy tries her best to be as kind as possible, it is revealed that at times she can become very insecure and sad, especially when she is confronted with an implication that involves Keiichi in one way or another. This aspect of her character provides one of the biggest plot points in the Ah! My Goddess movie: Belldandy's possessiveness of Keiichi could make her an easy target for manipulation or even brainwashing, if the right buttons were pressed; her jealousy of Morgan Le Fay was what allowed Celestin, her teacher, to lure Belldandy into his plans.

As noted by Perper and Cornog, Belldandy, as a depiction of what they term "kirei", is comfortable "being loved and admired" and very much aware of her own beauty—yet this does not equate to vanity.

=== Abilities ===
Belldandy is unflinchingly kind, patient, and warm, not only to Keiichi but to everyone, without exception. This, however, does not mean that she is to be taken lightly; Belldandy is licensed as a "goddess first-class, unlimited", and as such is depicted as being highly skilled. Her power is so great that she is required to wear a special earring on her left ear which constantly seals the full brunt of her magical strength. The only time at which she has ever revealed her true strength is during the "Lord of Terror" arc. At the end of this arc, Belldandy completely reconstructed their home from rubble, mentioning that doing so only took one ten-millionth of her power.

Belldandy's capacities and talents are diverse, whether magical or worldly. Not only can she change the appearance of her clothing and levitate (and, by extension, fly), but she can also teleport through mirrors, speak to and understand animals, "see" people's emotions as auras, heal minor wounds by speeding metabolism, and "speak" to machines. Furthermore, she is a superb cook, and her singing skills are held to be the best in the heavens. She is also incapable of becoming inebriated on alcoholic drinks, but instead becomes so with soda. (One can is enough to send her in a drunken rampage—although given her personality, "rampage" takes an entirely different, but no less destructive, meaning). During the manga's publication, more of Belldandy's capabilities are discovered, but she probably has many more : Urd notes that Belldandy loves accumulating capabilities, but usually doesn't mention them herself. Among those seen in the manga, she has a Valkyrie diploma - as demonstrated when she neutralizes Thrym the Invincible in hand-to-hand combat - and she's a champion flying broom racer. The only thing she can't do is lie (it is linked to her qualification as a goddess first class). She will go to great length to not hurt others provided Keichi isn't in harm's way, otherwise she will "deal" with anything and anyone standing in her way (see Thrym above for the most out of character example) whatever the cost on herself.

=== Holy Bell ===
Each of the fully-fledged goddesses in the series is teamed with an "angel", that represents the goddesses' "True Self" or "Higher Self". Belldandy's angel is called Holy Bell (Blesséd Bell in some versions of the English manga); her elemental attribute is wind. Like the other angels in the series, Holy Bell augments Belldandy's magical powers when called upon, and like all angels, she also reflects her master's current state. For example, when Belldandy falls unconscious after being infected with a virus, Holy Bell emerges comatose and covered with crystals that represent the virus.

== Plot overview ==
Belldandy is introduced to the series when Keiichi Morisato, portrayed as a typical college student with a notable lack of experience with women, accidentally dials the "Goddess Relief Agency" when attempting to order take-away noodles (the reason is simply explained as fate in the manga and anime adaptations). Belldandy appears before Keiichi and offers to grant him a wish. Convinced that the whole incident is a prank played on him by his seniors (Senpais), Keiichi half-jokingly wishes her to stay with him forever. ("I want a goddess like you to be by my side forever"). The wish, of course, is granted—thus providing one of the key premises of the series.

With Belldandy and Keiichi now portrayed as a couple, Fujishima introduces other factors: specifically the complications caused by family and friends. Forced to leave his dorm, as women are not permitted to stay on the premises, Keiichi and Belldandy end up living at the Tariki Hongan Temple in the city of Nekomi, Chiba Prefecture near Tokyo. Within both the manga and the anime, the temple was turned over to them by its former guardian, Koshian, a Buddhist monk who was overwhelmed by the purity of Belldandy's spirit and her unparalleled skills in polishing the temple altar, in cooking, and in Zazen meditation. Koshian departs the series by leaving for a pilgrimage to find spiritual perfection, (although he does briefly return later in the series), turning over the temple to Belldandy and Keiichi's care without realizing Belldandy's true nature as a Goddess. Later, Fujishima has Belldandy's two sisters (Urd and Skuld) join Belldandy and Keiichi in the temple. The story then follows the numerous misadventures of the not-so normal household, their growth over the course of the series and the budding romance between an ordinary young man and an angelic goddess.

=== Relationship with Keiichi ===
Although Belldandy was sent to grant Keiichi a wish and nothing more, Belldandy expresses many times that she has enjoyed her time with Keiichi and that her purpose is to make him happy. The contract really is an excuse for her to stay since her rival Marller, a first class demon, has stated that "she can cancel a contract with a human anytime". Belldandy had then stated that she did not want to, because Keiichi was a special person in her heart. This was reinforced at the conclusion of chapter 39: with the "System" down, Belldandy's contract with Keiichi is effectively suspended, yet she chooses to stay because, as Fujishima has her explain in the manga, "... I'm here now because I love you".

There have been a couple of noticeable twitches in this however, when Belldandy shows doubt as to her future with Keiichi. When he takes up his job at Whirlwind towards the end of his time at Nekomi Tech, Belldandy reflects on how he's beginning to follow his dream, before wondering just how far she can follow it with him. Then at the start of the current storyline in Volume 38, in which the demon Hagall overthrows Hild, Keiichi asks Belldandy if she will walk with him as his companion in life; she hesitates, saying "I... Of course I will", without meeting his eyes.

In chapter 285, "Kiss of Truth", Hild reveals that Keiichi's sexual desires for Belldandy have previously been sealed away in order to prevent humans and gods from mating, as would be the natural consequences of Keiichi's wish for a goddess to be with him always. This explains why Keiichi has never been very forward in their relationship. Although Belldandy has never lied about this situation, she has also never told him. When the old contract was dissolved and a new one is formed, Belldandy and Keiichi are immediately confronted with an Interracial Romance Inquisitor (Ansuz, mother of Belldandy and Skuld) who immediately sets a trial to determine if they are really meant to be together, and should Keiichi fail, they shall be separated forever. Once passing the test, Belldandy and Keiichi are allowed by the heavens to live together as a proper couple, with their wedding ceremony being held in the final chapter.

== Depictions ==
The character is depicted as being extremely beautiful, but not voluptuous in the same sense as her sister, Urd, nor does she possess the youthfulness of her younger sister, Skuld. As described by Perper and Cornog:

Belldandy in particular is drawn in kirei style—her prettiness is not the youthful innocence of bishojo or kawaii, but instead centers on composure, tranquillity, and utter self-possession coupled with great loveliness. Belldandy has a gentle elegance that is hard to describe, for example when her long, dark blonde hair flies about in sweeps and whorls and accentuates her movements.

— Perper and Cornog, page 65

She is often depicted in "angelic" poses, with "impossibly long" hair, sparkling eyes, and a perfectly proportioned body.

=== Manga ===
When Fujishima first started drawing Oh My Goddess! his style resembled that of his earlier series, You're Under Arrest, and as such lacked the polish that became evident in his later work. However, as his style evolved it became more refined, as seen in works such as those collected in Childhood's End. As part of this process the depictions of Belldandy within the manga have undergone change, with the later drawings displaying greater refinement than those in the earlier chapters. Nevertheless, it did not take long for Fujishima's style to emerge: while still considered to be one of his earlier works, in the "Terrible Master Urd" story arc many of his trademarks are already apparent, including the "long flowing, well-drawn hair". In Chapter 293 of the manga, Belldandy's original design was depicted in a flashback prior to coming to Earth using Fujishima's current drawing style.

Belldandy from "Wrong Number", 1989

Belldandy from "The Goddesses' Big Crisis", 1991

=== Anime ===
Belldandy from Oh My Goddess! (OVA), 1993

Kosuke Fujishima was involved in the design for the OVA, (even working on some of the storyboards), and the design of Belldandy is consistent with that of the manga of the period. While Fujishima wasn't as involved in Ah! My Goddess: The Movie, so that the character designs were produced Hidenori Matsuhara, the finished result has since been described as "staying true to Kosuke Fujishima's original designs". The TV series saw slightly greater change, with the producers opting to update and redesign the characters in line with modern anime, especially when contrasted to the earlier manga. Nevertheless, while Belldandy has a more rounded face in the TV series than in the manga, the approach is still in keeping with Fujishima's style. Adventures of Mini Goddess is quite different, being drawn in the super deformed style, and thus Belldandy's appearance differs considerably from the manner in which she is depicted elsewhere.

In the OVA, TV series, movie and in The Adventures of Mini Goddess, the original voice of Belldandy was provided by voice actress Kikuko Inoue; such was the success of Inoue that Fujishima was said to have been influenced by her when developing the manga character after the release of the first OVA. Akemi Okamura took on the role for the first 13 episodes of Adventures of a Mini Goddess due to Inoue's pregnancy.

Three different voice actors have provided Belldandy's voice in the English versions of the various anime series. For the English OVA, Belldandy's voice was provided by Juliet Cesario, with her child voice being played by Juliet Cesario with the aid of helium. Bridget Hoffman, (performing as Ruby Marlowe), provided the voice of Belldandy in both the movie and The Adventures of Mini Goddess, while Eileen Stevens voiced Belldandy for both seasons of the TV series.

== Reception and critique ==
The character of Belldandy was generally well received and has a large number of fans, as evidenced when she was voted the second most popular female character in a 2001 poll in Newtype. In addition, Belldandy topped the Animage character polls for many months and was placed third on the all time Best Character list at the 17th Anime Grand Prix held in 1993. Nevertheless, as reviewer Zac Bertschy described the situation: "People tend to go either way on the Belldandy character; either she's an obnoxious, archaic fantasy girl for men who prefer their women to act like indentured servants, or she's the archetype of perfection, a flawless example of graceful femininity".

The critique that Belldandy represents a negative stereotype of women, placing them in a subservient role to men, appears a number of times in the literature. Annalee Newitz states that the manner in which Belldandy is portrayed in the series would, in all likelihood, be impossible in the United States—especially, as she goes on to say, since "the advent of feminism and the women's rights movement". While Newitz sees this as reflective of Japanese culture, arguing that characters such as Belldandy are possible because feminist issues do not have the same recognition within Japan as they do in many Western countries, Susan J. Napier takes a very different line. She argues that characters such as Belldandy may be a reaction to the increasing assertiveness of women in Japan, thus presenting Belldandy as an attempt to reinforce traditional cultural values, rather than a reflection of them. To demonstrate this, Napier points to Belldandy's role in "Moonlight and Cherry Blossoms", the first of the OVA episodes. The episode begins with disorder, as Keiichi is evicted from his dorm after Belldandy's chaotic appearance into his life, but ends with a return to "traditional values", signified through the restoration of the old temple. Similarly, Napier notes that Belldandy's cooking is often commended by the other characters, and as such is another way in which the character of Belldandy can be seen to reinforce more traditional female roles. Carlos Ross of THEM Anime Reviews considers Belldandy's characterization in the film much better than in the OVA series, where he describes her as a "doormat".

Either way, commentators still notice strengths in Belldandy's character. While acknowledging the conservative portrayal, Napier describes Belldandy as "almost a perfect dream of feminine nurturance" and identifying that she has a "soothing and escapist function", while reviewer Megan Lavey states that Belldandy is no pushover, and that she can hold her own, noting that she is making "the best of difficult circumstances."

Another line of criticism of Belldandy relates to the sexual nature of the character, with Belldandy being described by one commentator as a "soft porn goddess". Nevertheless, other commentators have observed that Belldandy might be sexual, but writers such as Gilles Poitras note that the series—far from being soft porn—is in fact a very tender and romantic comedy: the characters do no more than simply kiss (and that infrequently) over the course of the series. Newitz suggests that part of the appeal of Oh My Goddess! is the romantic nature of the story: "In anime, romantic love is possible because overt sexuality is not". According to Newitz the relationships in romantic anime, such as Oh My Goddess!, are not about consummation but about "sexual innuendo and deferral".
