= Anime Complex =

Japanese animation block

Anime Complex was a series of omnibus Japanese anime shows broadcast on WOWOW and Kids Station. It featured two unrelated series from various producers (notably Bandai Visual and Pony Canyon) of 15 minutes each per airing, and cycled as one series ended. It had three runs from 1998 to 2001.

== Broadcasting ==
The first, Anime Complex, was broadcast on WOWOW from April 6 to September 28, 1998. It aired the following anime:

- Maico 2010
- Neo Ranga
- The Adventures of Mini-Goddess

The program was a large success, leading to a second program, Anime Complex II, which cycled shows as they ended. In the course of its run (October 5, 1998, to April 4, 2000), it contained the following shows:

- D4 Princess
- Kurogane Communication
- Neo Ranga
- Omishi Magical Theater: Risky Safety
- Steel Angel Kurumi

Another series, Anime Complex Night, followed, with season 1 airing from April 7 to June 29, 2001, on WOWOW and season 2 airing from April 2 to June 29, 2002, on KIDS STATION. It featured the following:

- Hanaukyo Maid Team (season 1)
- Rizelmine (season 2)
- Steel Angel Kurumi 2
