= Urðr =

Norn in Norse mythology

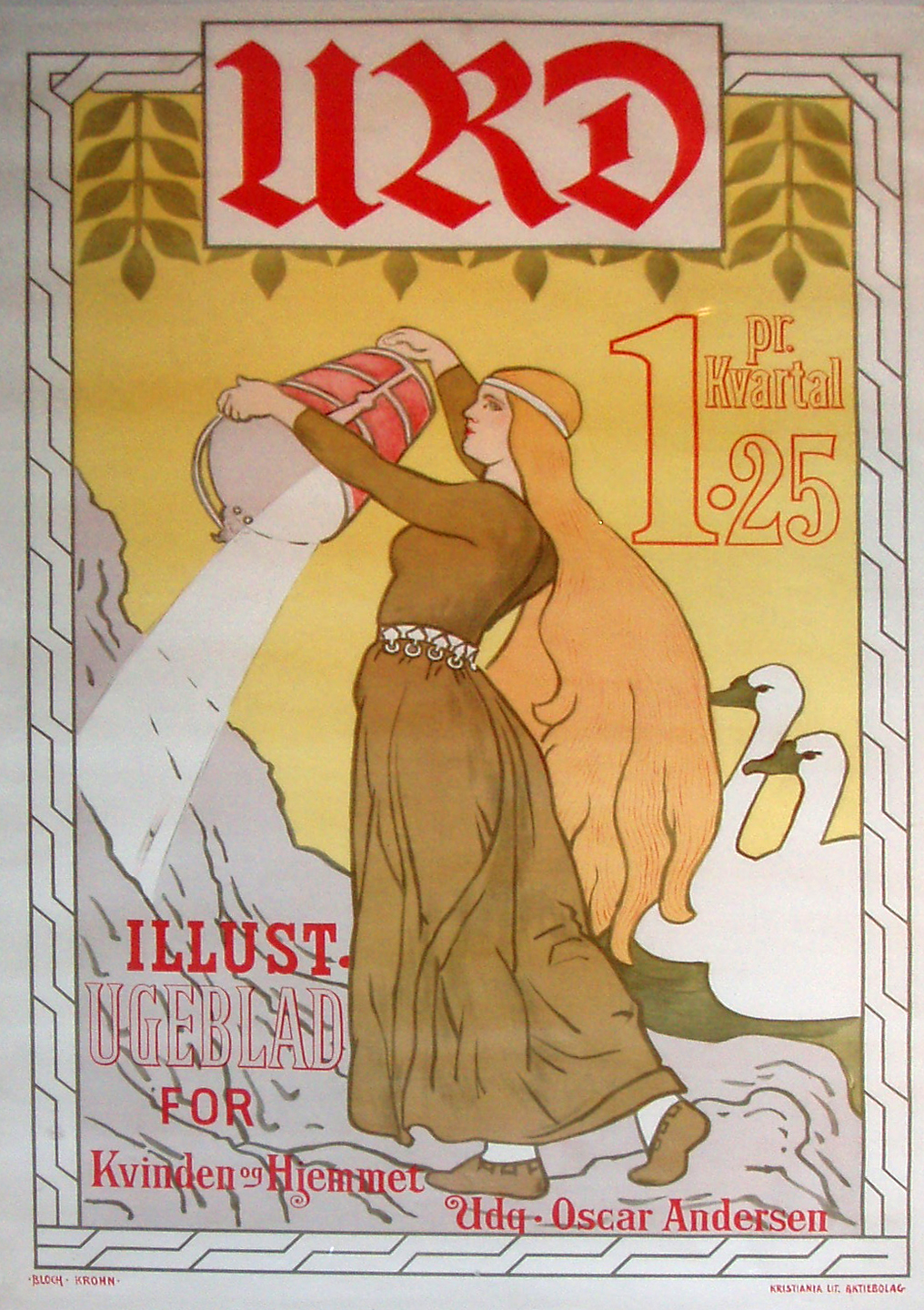
A poster for the Norwegian women's magazine Urd by Andreas Bloch and Olaf Krohn.

Urðr (Old Norse: fate) is one of the Norns in Norse mythology. Along with Verðandi (possibly "happening" or "present") and Skuld (possibly "debt" or "future"), Urðr makes up a trio of Norns that are described as deciding the fates of people. Urðr is attested in stanza 20 of the Poetic Edda poem Völuspá and the Prose Edda book Gylfaginning.

Urðr is together with the other Norns located at the well Urðarbrunnr beneath the world ash tree Yggdrasil of Asgard. They spin threads of life, cut marks in the pole figures and measure people's destinies, which shows the fate of all human beings and gods. Norns are always present when a child is born and decide its fate. The three Norns represent the past (Urðr), future (Skuld) and present (Verðandi).

Urðr is commonly written as Urd or Urth. In some English translations, her name is glossed with the Old English form of urðr; Wyrd.

== Attestations ==
In the Poetic Edda, Yggdrasil is said to stand "always over Urd's well", or the well of fate. Urd's well is located in Asgard. Urd appears in the Völva's prophecy Völuspá:

Benjamin Thorpe translation:
Thence come maidens, much knowing,
three from the hall, which under that tree stands
Urd hight the one, the second Verdandi,
on a tablet they graved—Skuld the third.
Laws they established, life allotted to the sons of men;
destinies pronounced.

Henry Adams Bellows translation:
Thence come the maidens mighty in wisdom,
Three from the dwelling down 'neath the tree;
Urth is one named, Verthandi the next, —
On the wood they scored, — and Skuld the third.
Laws they made there, and life allotted
To the sons of men, and set their fates.

== Sources ==
- Bellows, Henry Adams (Trans.) (1923). The Poetic Edda. New York: The American-Scandinavian Foundation.
- Orchard, Andy (1997) Dictionary of Norse Myth and Legend (Orion Publishing Group) ISBN 0-304-34520-2
- Lindow, John (2001) Norse Mythology: A Guide to the Gods, Heroes, Rituals, and Beliefs (Oxford University Press) ISBN 0-19-515382-0
- Steinsland, Gro (2005) Norrøn religion : myter, riter, samfunn (Oslo: Pax forlag) ISBN 978-82-530-2607-7
- Bugge, Sophus (2010) Norroen Fornkvaedi (Nabu Press) ISBN 978-1-146-65668-9
- Thorpe, Benjamin (Trans.) (1907). The Elder Edda of Saemund Sigfusson. Norrœna Society.
