= Oh My Goddess! =

Japanese manga series and its franchise

- First tankōbon volume cover, featuring Belldandy

ああっ女神さまっ (Ā Megami-sama)
- Genre: Fantasy; Harem; Romantic comedy
- Manga
- Written by: Kōsuke Fujishima
- Published by: Kodansha
- English publisher: NA: Dark Horse Comics
- Imprint: Afternoon KC
- Magazine: Monthly Afternoon
- English magazine: NA: Super Manga Blast!
- Original run: September 1988 – April 25, 2014
- Volumes: 48
Further information
Original video animation
Directed by	Hiroaki Gōda
Written by	Kunihiko Kondo; Nahoko Hasegawa
Music by	Takeshi Yasuda
Studio	AIC
Licensed by	AUS: Madman Entertainment; NA: AnimEigo (former); UK: MVM Films
Released	February 2, 1993 – May 17, 1994
Runtime	30 minutes (each)
Episodes	5
Anime television series
Adventures of Mini-Goddess
Directed by	Hiroko Kazui; Yasuhiro Matsumura
Written by	Shōji Yonemura
Music by	Tatsuya Maruyama
Studio	OLM
Licensed by	NA: Geneon Entertainment (former); UK: MVM Films
Original network	Wowow
Original run	April 6, 1998 – March 29, 1999
Episodes	48
Anime television series
Ah! My Goddess
Directed by	Hiroaki Gōda
Written by	Akira Watanabe; Hiroaki Gōda
Music by	Shirō Hamaguchi
Studio	AIC
Licensed by	NA: Media Blasters; UK: MVM Films
Original network	TBS
Original run	January 6, 2005 – July 7, 2005
Episodes	24 + 2 OVA
Anime television series
Ah! My Goddess: Flights of Fancy
Directed by	Hiroaki Gōda
Written by	Akira Watanabe; Hiroaki Gōda
Music by	Shirō Hamaguchi
Studio	AIC
Licensed by	Crunchyroll
Original network	TBS
Original run	April 6, 2006 – September 14, 2006
Episodes	24
Novel
Oh My Goddess! First End
Written by	Yumi Tōma
Illustrated by	Kōsuke Fujishima; Hidenori Matsubara
Published by	Kodansha
English publisher	NA: Dark Horse Comics
Published	July 20, 2007
Original video animation
Ah! My Goddess: Fighting Wings
Directed by	Hiroaki Gōda
Written by	Akira Watanabe; Hiroaki Gōda
Music by	Shirō Hamaguchi
Studio	AIC
Released	December 9, 2007
Runtime	25 minutes (each)
Episodes	2
Original video animation
Ah! My Goddess: Together Forever
Directed by	Hiroaki Gohda
Written by	Akira Watanabe
Music by	Shirō Hamaguchi
Studio	AIC
Released	February 23, 2011 – August 23, 2013
Runtime	30 minutes (each)
Episodes	3
Manga
Aa Shūkatsu no Megami-sama
Written by	Uhei Aoki
Illustrated by	Kumichi Yoshizuki
Published by	Kodansha
Imprint	Afternoon KC
Magazine	Monthly Afternoon
Original run	January 25, 2019 – October 25, 2021
Volumes	5
- Anime film
- Ah! My Goddess: The Movie (2000)
- icon

Oh My Goddess! (Japanese: ああっ女神さまっ, Hepburn: Aa! Megami-sama), or Ah! My Goddess in some releases, is a Japanese manga series written and illustrated by Kōsuke Fujishima. It was serialized in Kodansha's seinen manga magazine Monthly Afternoon from September 1988 to April 2014, with its chapters collected in 48 tankōbon volumes. The series follows college sophomore Keiichi Morisato and the goddess Belldandy who moves in with him in a Buddhist temple; after Belldandy's sisters Urd and Skuld move in with them, they encounter gods, demons and other supernatural entities as Keiichi develops his relationship with Belldandy. The manga series has been licensed for English-language release by Dark Horse Comics.

The series was adapted into an original video animation produced by Anime International Company (AIC), and an anime series which aired from 2005 to 2006. Additionally, AIC has developed two OVAs and a film, and OLM, Inc. has also developed an anime series as well. Companies have developed thousands of types of merchandise, such as video games, and a light novel. The OVA was licensed by AnimEigo, while the film was licensed by Geneon Entertainment, and the various TV series were licensed at various points by Media Blasters, ADV Films and Funimation.

As of June 2020, the manga had over 25 million copies in circulation, making it one of the best-selling manga series. In 2009, Oh My Goddess! won the 33rd Kodansha Manga Award for the general category.

== Story ==
=== Plot ===
Keiichi Morisato is a college sophomore who accidentally calls the Goddess Help Line. The goddess Belldandy materializes and tells him that her agency has received a system request from him and has been sent to grant him a single wish. Believing that a practical joke is being played on him, he wishes that she will stay with him forever, and his wish is granted.

Since he is unable to live with Belldandy in his male-only dorms, they are forced to look for alternative housing, eventually seeking shelter in an old Buddhist temple. They are allowed to stay there indefinitely after the young monk living there leaves on a pilgrimage to India upon being impressed by Belldandy's intrinsic goodness. Keiichi's life with Belldandy becomes even more hectic when her elder sister Urd and her younger sister Skuld move in as well. A series of adventures ensue as his relationship with Belldandy develops.

=== Setting ===
The Oh My Goddess! universe is fashioned loosely around Celtic/Norse mythology; various names and concepts are recycled for humor. Three worlds exist in the universe of Oh My Goddess!: Heaven (Valhalla), Hell (Niflheim), and Earth. Heaven is the realm of the All Mighty and goddesses, Hell is the realm of Hild and demons, and Earth is the realm of humans. Reality is controlled by an enormous and complex computer system, named Yggdrasil.

Each goddess is assigned Class, Category, and Restrictions. Class indicates power and skill in performing pure magic. First Class goddesses are held to a stricter standard regarding the prohibition to lie. There are also three categories: Administration, Commercial (Field), and Special Duty. Limited and Unlimited restrictions indicates boundaries on permitted actions. Goddesses may be penalized for dereliction of duty and may have their license suspended for a time. A goddess using her powers during suspension will have her license permanently revoked. Belldandy is a Goddess First Class, Second Category, Unlimited License. Urd and Skuld are Goddesses Second Class, First Category, Limited License. Goddesses also wear power limiters, usually in the form of jewelry.

The goddesses' purpose is to bring happiness to everyone around them. Toward that end, Heaven has created the Goddess Technical Helpline (also called Goddess Relief Agency), designed to bring happiness to the people of Earth, especially those with great virtue but terrible misfortune. A competing institution named the Earth Assistance Center, also is staffed by goddesses. In most scenarios, a goddess appears before one that the system has deemed worthy and grants him or her one wish. The wish must be approved by the system, after which a contract is created between the human and the goddess and stored on the Yggdrasil system as a file. The wish contract file is protected by a passcode known to the Goddess. As demons work toward the opposite end, the total happiness on Earth must remain in balance. Heaven and Hell strictly abide by an agreement to work through contracts and to prevent bloodshed between them, each god is linked to a demon by a life contract, thus if one of them is killed, the other perishes as well, with their memories of the contract erased to ensure no one knows who is paired with whom.

Demons have similar class and license restrictions, and are accompanied by familiars instead of angels. A seal exists between the demon world and Earth, named the Gate to the Netherworld. It was "created by the gods and can only be broken by an instrument of the gods." As such, demons require a catalyst to manifest on Earth. The demons possess a system similar to Yggdrasil, named Nidhogg. Both demons and goddesses possess the power to seal beings away. The demons also operate in a fashion similar to goddesses by creating contracts with humans and offering them wishes, but often at a price.

A goddess does not have an angel automatically, but receives one in egg form. When her power matures, the egg hatches into an angel, becoming a lifetime companion. The angel always obeys the goddess, being a reflection of the goddess' inner self.

Other creatures that exist in the Earth plane are a multitude of spirits that are responsible for almost every aspect of life. These include the spirits of Money, Wind, Engine and such. More specific entities include Earth spirits, which are guardians over a specific area of land. Morgan le Fay, a villain from the movie, is probably a high ranking Earth spirit (or a being from another dimension, but that is less likely because her tragic love story with a human must have happened on Earth) who demonstrates great strength fighting Belldandy and Urd, even though her powers are less potent than the ones of goddesses of their level.

== Production ==
Before starting work on Oh My Goddess!, Kōsuke Fujishima created the manga You're Under Arrest!. Miyuki Kobayakawa, one of the principal characters of You're Under Arrest!, was featured as a goddess character in a four-panel gag strip in the manga. While the exact relationship between this initial goddess character and the Oh My Goddess! series is unclear, there are suggestions that Oh My Goddess! can be viewed as a spin-off series. Irrespective of the origin, the concept of a goddess "as a job" interested Fujishima, leading to the first appearance of the Oh My Goddess! series in Kodansha's Monthly Afternoon in September 1988.

=== Title discrepancy ===
Translating the original Japanese title of Aa! Megami-sama! (ああっ女神さまっ) proved to be problematic. Fred Patten, in writing the preface to the collection "Watching Anime, Reading Manga: 25 Years of Essays and Reviews", stated that fans were still debating whether "Ah! My Goddess" or "Oh My Goddess!" should be used at the time of writing, approximately 15 years after the first Oh My Goddess! manga was published. When the United States anime import company AnimEigo obtained the original video animation (OVA) rights, they titled the series Oh My Goddess! This approach was also followed by Toren Smith and Dark Horse Comics when translating the manga, released in concert with the OVA series in 1994. Smith has since stated that he saw the title as a play on "Oh my god!", and felt that there was no problem when translating it. Smith confirmed that his interpretation of the author's intent was correct by consulting with Fujishima. Nevertheless, Kodansha's bilingual release of the manga used Ah! My Goddess, as did Pioneer's North American release of the film, and Media Blasters's 2005 DVD release of the TV series.

Fujishima stated in Animerica that "Oh" was closer to his intent, but acknowledged that the title should be rendered so as to make sense within the country that it is published, and specifically stated that films may warrant different titles than other works. He did, however, state that he would prefer to see consistency between the titles of the manga and those of the animations.

== Media ==
=== Manga ===
Written and illustrated by Kōsuke Fujishima, Oh My Goddess! started in Kodansha's seinen manga magazine Monthly Afternoon in September 1988, and finished after a 25-year run on April 25, 2014. Kodansha collected its 308 individual chapters in forty-eight tankōbon volumes, released from August 23, 1989, to July 23, 2014. The final volume of the manga was also released in Japan as a limited edition box set containing a special edition of volume 48, a mini book of all the Adventures of Mini-Goddess comics that appeared in the first volumes of the manga, a drama CD featuring the anime voice actors, and a selection of high quality prints of past volume covers, and the final volume cover.

A spin-off manga series, titled Aa Shūkatsu no Megami-sama (ああっ就活の女神さまっ; lit. 'Ah My Job-Hunting Goddess'), written by Uhei Aoki and illustrated by Kumichi Yoshizuki, focused on Keiichi and Belldandy's lives during a recession, was serialized in Monthly Afternoon from January 25, 2019, to October 25, 2021. Kodansha published the first tankōbon volume on September 20, 2019. The fifth and final volume was released on January 21, 2022.

==== English release ====
In North America, the series was licensed for English release by Dark Horse Comics and first published in a left-to-right format. The company initially published the first 112 chapters individually from August 1, 1994, to September 1, 2004. They also serialized individual chapters in their defunct manga anthology, Super Manga Blast!, from March 29, 2000, to April 25, 2001.

The first three volumes were initially published in a single abridged volume, titled "1-555-GODDESS", on November 1, 1996. After this release, the following collected volumes contained the regular unabridged chapters (although with different amount of chapters from their respective Japanese volumes, so that each volume better followed story arcs), starting from volume 4, released on October 15, 1997; the first three volumes were later re-released as unabridged volumes between June 5 and October 7, 2002. The 19th and last volume of this edition, numbered "19/20", which ended on the same chapter as the Japanese volume 20 (129th chapter), was released on January 19, 2005.

From volume 21, released on July 6, 2005, Dark Horse Comics published the volumes following the Japanese right-to-left chapter layout and using a new translation; the first twenty volumes were republished in this format from December 7, 2005, to February 22, 2012. The 48th and last volume was released on October 20, 2015.

In July 2014, Dark Horse Comics announced that they would release a fifteen-volume omnibus edition. The first volume was released on July 29, 2015. As of March 27, 2024, seven volumes have been released.

=== Light novel ===
The first novel of the series, Oh My Goddess! First End, was written by Urd's voice actress, Yumi Tōma, with the illustrations done by Fujishima and Hidenori Matsubara, the animation director for several of the series' animated adaptations. The story follows the manga, taking place three years after Belldandy and Keiichi first meet. The novel was first published in Japan on July 20, 2006, by Kodansha; it was then licensed in English by Dark Horse and released in North America on December 12, 2007.

=== Anime ===
==== Original video animation ====
In 1993, Anime International Company, KSS, Tokyo Broadcasting System and Kodansha teamed up to produce a five-episode original video animation (OVA) series based on the manga series. Directed by Hiroaki Gōda and distributed by Pony Canyon, the first episode was released on February 21, 1993, and the final was released on May 17, 1994.

The screenplay was written by Kunihiko Kondo and Nahoko Hasegawa, and the music was provided by Takeshi Yasuda. The character designer was Hidenori Matsubara.

The OVA was licensed for release in North America by AnimEigo, who released all five episodes in individual VHS volumes in both English-language and subtitled Japanese-language editions between June 29, 1994, and August 31, 1994. AnimEigo had released all five episodes on Laserdisc on two laserdiscs in Japanese language with English subtitles and on three laserdiscs in Japanese language with English subtitles on one side and English language on the other side by November 1996. They later released all five episodes across two DVD volumes in 2001, then re-released the episodes in a single "Remastered Collector's Edition" set in 2006. AnimEigo's license expired at the end of February 2010.

In March 2010, TBS announced they were producing a brand new 7-minute OVA for release only with a repackaged and redesigned boxed set for the first season. The first OVA was bundled with the 42nd volume of the manga, released on February 23, 2011. A second OVA was bundled with the 43rd volume, released on September 22, 2011. A third OVA was bundled with the 46th volume, released on August 23, 2013.

==== Film ====
A film, titled Ah! My Goddess: The Movie (劇場版ああっ女神さまっ, Gekijōban Aa! Megami-sama), premiered in Japan in 2000. It saw the return of the main cast, along with several popular characters from the manga who had not appeared in any of the previous anime. It is distributed in Japan by Shochiku and in North America and United Kingdom by Geneon Entertainment in 2001. The plot does not seem to follow any of the existing canon, but uses plot devices from several different story arcs from the manga, mostly the Lord Of Terror arc.

==== TV series ====
===== The Adventures of Mini-Goddess =====
A 48 episode TV series called Adventures of Mini-Goddess (ああっ女神さまっ 小っちゃいって事は便利だねっ, Aa! Megami-sama! Chicchaitte Koto wa Benri da ne) and featuring shrunken versions of Urd, Belldandy, and Skuld in a comedic super deformed style was produced by Oriental Light and Magic and aired on WOWOW from April 6, 1998 through March 29, 1999 as a part of the omnibus show Anime Complex. It is distributed in Japan by Pony Canyon and in North America by Geneon Entertainment. This series departs the most from the original manga storyline, and has almost no continuity with the previous series. The series revolves around the three goddesses and their rat companion Gan-chan, following their adventures in their temple home. The goddesses remain constantly in miniaturized form, for apparent freedom of space and in order to properly interact with Gan-chan.

===== Ah! My Goddess =====
Oh My Goddess! saw another TV iteration under the name Ah! My Goddess in 2005. The episodes, which followed the manga closely, were directed by Hiroaki Gōda, animated by Anime International Company, and produced by Tokyo Broadcasting System (TBS). The season began in Japan, on TBS, on January 6, 2005, and ended on July 7, 2005. Bandai Visual released the episodes in Japan between April and November 2005, as eight DVD compilations each containing three episodes. The two original video animations (OVAs), which had not been broadcast, were released on a special DVD on December 23, 2005. The series was licensed for a Region 1 release by Media Blasters. Six DVD compilations, containing all twenty-six episodes, were released between September 2005 and July 2006. Each DVD contained four episodes, excluding the first two, which contained five each. A premium complete season box set was released on November 7, 2006; the regular set followed on November 27, 2007. MVM Films distributed the series in the United Kingdom, with the individual volumes released between February and December 2007 in six similar DVD compilations. The box set followed in July 2008. Media Blasters confirmed on Facebook that the license to Ah! My Goddess has been expired, leaving the series out-of-print, but these episodes are still available on Hulu despite the license expiration.

The success of the first season inspired a second season titled Ah! My Goddess: Everyone Has Wings, released as Ah! My Goddess: Flights of Fancy in North America. Also directed by Hiroaki Gōda, animated by Anime International Company, and produced by Tokyo Broadcasting System, the series covered the adventures of Keiichi and Belldandy in the aftermath of the Lord of Terror fiasco. It premiered on TBS on April 6, 2006, and concluded on September 14, 2006, picking up the story from where the series left off in season one. Season two concluded with episode 22, although the Japanese and North American DVD releases include episodes 23 and 24. It was released to DVD in Japan between July 2006 and February 2007 by Bandai Visual. Media Blasters, who released the first season, passed up on this season and it was licensed to ADV Films instead. ADV Films released the season on six DVD compilations, each containing four episodes, between May 2007 and March 2008. The rights were then transferred to Funimation, who released a box set on November 25, 2008.

In 2007, Ah! My Goddess: Fighting Wings, a two-episode special to commemorate the 20th anniversary of the original publication of Oh My Goddess!, was released. It was directed by Hiroaki Gōda, animated by Anime International Company, and produced by Tokyo Broadcasting System. The episodes aired on December 9, 2007 and Bandai Visual released the episodes on a single DVD in Japan on February 22, 2008. Bandai Visual released the entire series on Blu-ray on September 24, 2014.

=== Soundtracks ===
The Japanese voice actors of the series are also professional singers. Either in the form of Goddess Family Club or an original soundtrack, the series has led to over a dozen albums.

=== Video games ===
Quiz: Ah! My Goddess—Stay with Fighting Wings Japanese Dreamcast disc cover

An adventure game titled Aa! Megami-sama! for the NEC PC-9801 was released in 1993 by Banpresto. An enhanced port was later released in 1997 for the PC-FX which added voice and other improvements.

A Dreamcast quiz game titled Quiz: Ah! My Goddess—Stay with Fighting Wings was released in August 1998 for the Sega Dreamcast. The player plays as Keiichi Morisato answering questions posed by other characters from the anime/manga, such as Belldandy, Skuld, Urd, Lind, and Peorth.

In February 2007 an Ah! My Goddess game developed by Marvelous Interactive was released in Japan for the PlayStation 2. The game was only released in Japan and was released in two editions, the limited edition (also known as the "Holy Box" edition) and the regular DVD edition.

== Reception ==
As of June 2020, the manga had over 25 million copies in circulation. In 2009, Oh My Goddess won the 33rd Kodansha Manga Award in the general category. Volume 41 of the manga was the tenth best-selling manga in Japan upon its release that week according to the Oricon Japanese Comic Rankings charts. The film ranked #28 on Wizard's Anime Magazine on their "Top 50 Anime released in North America". In the American Anime Awards from 2007, the anime series was a nominee in the category Best Comedy Anime, but lost to FLCL.
