= Verðandi =

Norn of the present time

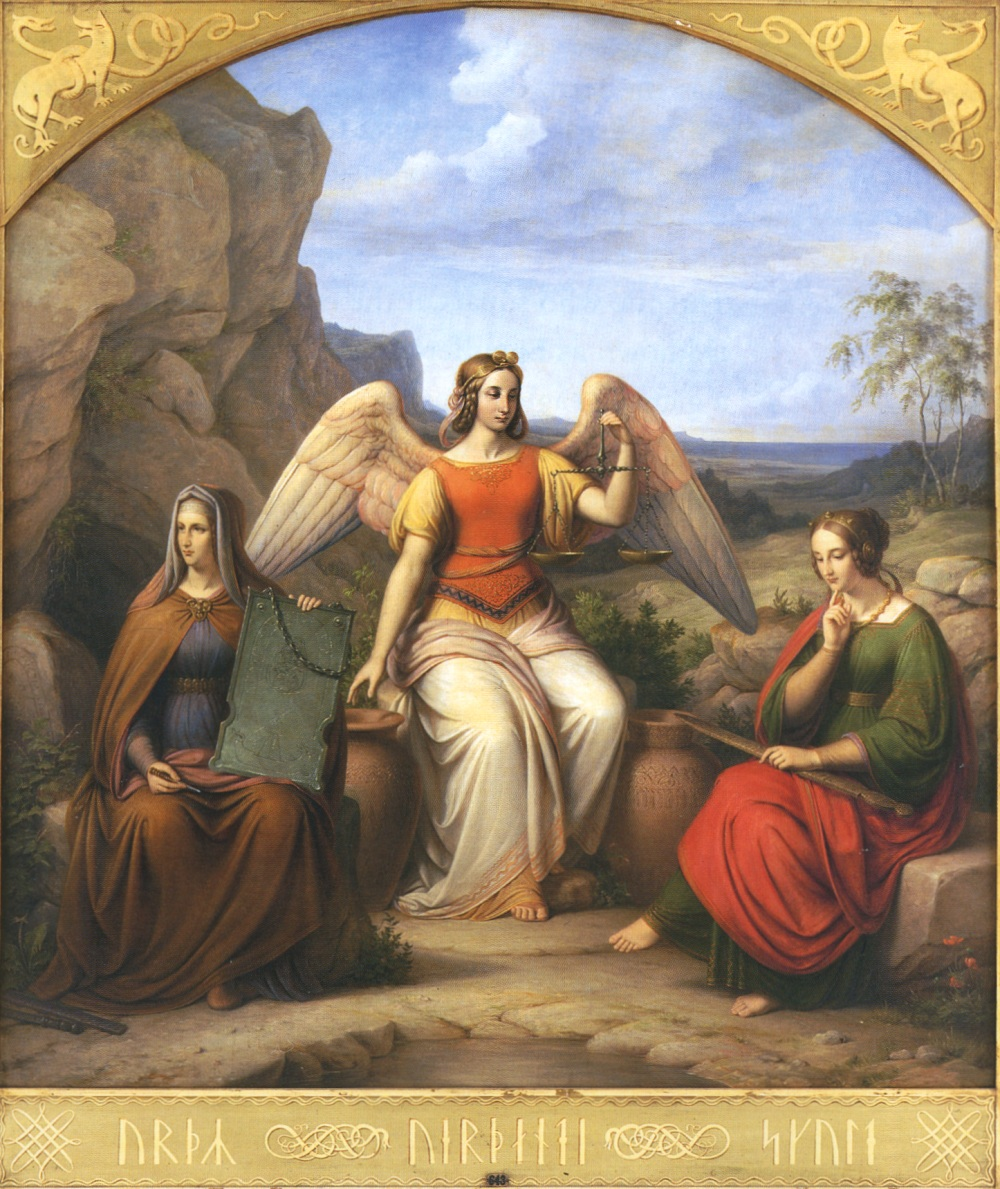
"Nornir" (c. 1884) by J. L. Lund, depicting Verðandi with wings.

In Norse mythology, Verðandi (Old Norse, meaning possibly "happening" or "present"), sometimes anglicized as Verdandi or Verthandi, is one of the norns. Along with Urðr (Old Norse "fate") and Skuld (possibly "debt" or "future"), Verðandi makes up a trio of Norns that are described as deciding the fates (wyrd) of people.

== Etymology ==
Verðandi is literally the present participle of the Old Norse verb "verða", "to become", and is commonly translated as "in the making" or "that which is happening/becoming"; it is related to the Dutch word worden and the German word werden, both meaning "to become". "Werdend" is not a commonly used German word in modern times, but intutitively means the things that "are becoming", as -nd is the gerund form.

== Attestation ==
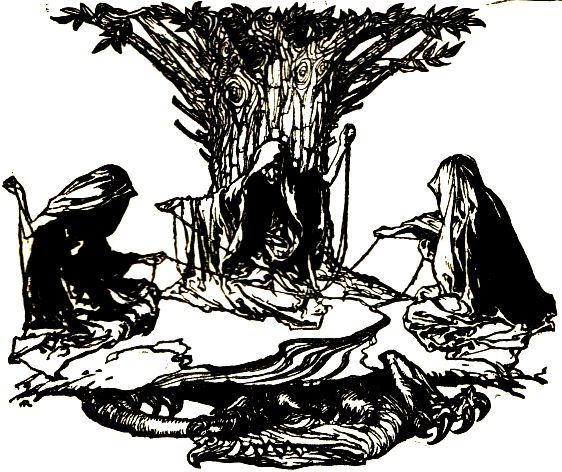
"Norns weaving destiny" (1912) by Arthur Rackham.

=== Völuspá ===
She appears in the following verse from the Poetic Edda poem Völuspá, along with Urðr and Skuld:

Þaðan koma meyjar margs vitandi þrjár, ór þeim sal er und þolli stendr; Urð hétu eina, aðra Verðandi, skáru á skíði, Skuld ina þriðju; þær lög lögðu, þær líf kuru alda börnum, örlög seggja.	Thence come maidens much knowing three from the hall which under that tree stands; Urd hight the one, the second Verdandi, on a tablet they graved, Skuld the third; Laws they established, life allotted to the sons of men, destinies pronounced.
