= Skuld =

Norn and Valkyrie in Norse mythology

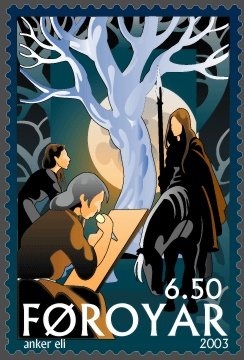
...and the youngest Norn, she who is called Skuld, ride[s] ever to take the slain and decide fights. Faroe stamp by Anker Eli Petersen depicting the norns (2003)

Skuld ("debt" or "obligation"; sharing etymology with the English "should") is a Norn in Norse mythology. Along with Urðr (Old Norse "fate") and Verðandi (possibly "happening" or "present"), Skuld makes up a trio of Norns that are described as deciding the fates of people. Skuld appears in at least two poems as a Valkyrie.

== Poetic Edda ==
Skuld is mentioned in Völuspá, a poem collected in the 13th century Poetic Edda:

Sá hon valkyrjur vítt um komnar, görvar at ríða til Goðþjóðar. Skuld helt skildi, en Skögul önnur, Gunnr, Hildr, Göndul ok Geirskögul.	She saw valkyries come from far and wide, ready to ride to Goðþjóð. Skuld held a shield, and Skögul was another, Gunnr, Hildr, Göndul and Geirskögul.

== Prose Edda ==
=== Gylfaginning ===
In the Prose Edda book Gylfaginning, Snorri informs the reader that the youngest Norn, Skuld, is in effect also a valkyrie, taking part in the selection of warriors from the slain:

These are called Valkyrs: them Odin sends to every battle; they determine men's feyness and award victory. Gudr and Róta and the youngest Norn, she who is called Skuld, ride ever to take the slain and decide fights."

=== Nafnaþulur ===
In the Nafnaþulur addition to Snorri Sturluson's Prose Edda the following sections reference Skuld:

Mank valkyrjur Viðris nefna. Hrist, Mist, Herja, Hlökk, Geiravör, Göll, Hjörþrimul, Gunnr, Herfjötur, Skuld, Geirönul, Skögul ok Randgníð. Ráðgríðr, Göndul, Svipul, Geirskögul, Hildr ok Skeggöld, Hrund, Geirdriful, Randgríðr ok Þrúðr, Reginleif ok Sveið, Þögn, Hjalmþrimul, Þrima ok Skalmöld.	I will recite the names of the valkyries of Viðrir (Odin). Hrist, Mist, Herja, Hlökk, Geiravör Göll, Hjörþrimul Gunnr, Herfjötur Skuld, Geirönul Skögul and Randgníð. Ráðgríðr, Göndul, Svipul, Geirskögul, Hildr and Skeggöld, Hrund, Geirdriful, Randgríðr and Þrúðr, Reginleif and Sveið, Þögn, Hjalmþrimul, Þrima and Skalmöld.

== See also ==
- Antevorta
- Atropos
