= Lord of Terror =

Lord of Terror may refer to:

- Lord of Terror (Oh My Goddess!), a character in Oh My Goddess!
- Lord of Terror (album), an album by Lord Infamous
- Angol Mois, a fictional character also known as the Lord of Terror in the manga Sgt. Frog
- Lord of Terror Baal, a boss in the Disgaea series of video games
