= Koshian =

Koshian may refer to:

- Koshian (越庵), a character from Oh My Goddess!
- Koshian (漉し餡), a type of red bean paste
