= List of Hare+Guu characters =

This article contains a list of fictional characters from the Japanese comics anime and manga series Haré+Guu.

== Description ==
Many characters in the series have names relating to weather (including, most obviously 'We-da'). The show's title has a double meaning, sounding like a weather forecast (Mostly fair skies, but then Guu) and a normal title (The Jungle was Nice, then came Guu). Many fans avoid translating the title, some simply referring to it as Hare Nochi Guu or (as the show does) HareGuu. Some fans of the show simply just refer to the show as Guu, being that Guu is a unique character.

== Characters ==
=== Main characters ===
- Haré (ハレ) (Hale in the manga)

Voiced by: Rikako Aikawa (Japanese); Philece Sampler (English)

One of the main protagonists of the series. Haré is a boy who grew up in a jungle village with Weda. He sports a sleeveless white shirt, red shorts, and is always barefoot. The usually patient and sweet-natured Haré (whose name means 'fair weather') is usually troubled by Guu's joy in creating chaos and he is prone to anxious rants or tantrums whenever Guu does something unnatural. This is accompanied by a sudden downpour of rain. Haré is used by Weda to do household chores and he is teased by Guu for having an Oedipus complex, exhibited in his competitive nature trying to keep Dr. Clive away from Weda. He gets worried about any other male character trying to win over Weda, such as Asio, coming to a boil in an episode where he throws himself into a competition over rights to her for a year, with Dr. Clive, Mari, and Uigher. Haré tends to think about things too much, and Guu takes advantage of that by psychoanalyzing Haré at every opportunity, and playfully taking advantage of Haré's neurosis. Hare is also seen reading the Hare+Guu manga. At the end of the manga, six years after Guu suddenly disappeared, Hare has become a teacher at the village school and marries Marie, who gives birth to his daughter. Upon seeing his face, the child gives him Guu's trademark smirk, which comically alarms Hare and prompts him to name her "Guu". In the omake, it appears the baby also has Guu's snarky attitude and generally demeaning behavior towards Hare, and she likes to act spoiled to annoy Hare.

- Guu (グゥ) (Goo in the manga)

Voiced by: Naoko Watanabe (Japanese); Stephanie Sheh (English)

One of the main protagonists of the series. Guu is a young girl with light pink hair, a pink dress, and is always barefoot. Guu's stomach is a world filled with buildings, hundred-legged cats, and a nice young couple of lovers that have been trapped there for ages (but apparently don't mind their predicament). Other than Haré, no character seems to be aware of Guu's strange nature (or for that matter the bizarre circumstances surrounding everything else in the series). The weird events that occur because of her are only ever acknowledged by Haré. Everyone who is eaten by Guu, only to be spat out later (excluding Haré) dismisses what happened as "sleeping" (occasionally, dreaming about Guu's Stomach world). Haré even dismisses his first time in Guu's Stomach but is quickly proved wrong. There are other strange things Guu can do which defy the laws of physics, logic, and reality which have included but are not limited to teleporting, time travel, reality warping, superhuman strength, elongating her body parts, breathing underwater, causing people to switch bodies, mind reading, causing disco music to play suddenly, switching her face (from a cute face to a completely plain face), transforming into a giant kaiju monster version of herself, and inciting mental breakdowns in Haré, though the latter is more of a talent than an actual power. She apparently has more than one stomach and cares enough about the people and creatures she swallows to keep dangerous things away from the area she keeps her 'guests'. Despite all this, Guu actually cares for some of Hare's personal problems, and often gives him advice with profound sayings- a lot of her powers are used to make Hare learn a lesson. At the end of the manga, Guu leads Hare to her birthplace in a dream (and refuses to let him go further, saying it would be a one-way trip for him), and it's strongly implied that Guu's birthplace is somewhere between life and death, and that she's some kind of physical god. Guu disappears the next morning, releasing the people in her stomach (who turn up in a TV show about missing people suddenly reappear) and erasing everybody's memories of her, except Hare's. Six years later, Hare spots Guu's smirk on his newborn daughter's face, and realizes she might be a reincarnation of Guu.

- Adult Guu (Big Guu in the manga)

A resident living inside Guu who is separate from Guu and can take over whenever she feels like it, she's a grown-up version of Guu and is very beautiful. Fortunately for Guu and the rest of the residents inside her stomach, she cares about them and their wants and desires, going so far as to steal Ame from Hare. She's also the one responsible for ripping off the village elder's chest hair, making him permanently traumatized of Guu. She also appeared one time to act as the school doctor after Clive tried unsuccessfully to give Guu a physical, causing Guu to tie-up Clive. Big Guu becomes a frequent visitor to the outside world when they are all in the city.

- Weda (ウェダ)

Voiced by: Kaoru Morota (Japanese); Wendee Lee (English)

Weda is Haré's mother. She is carefree and inclined to binge drinking. Because of her laziness, Haré looks after her and does most of the "housewifely" things. She left life in a rich home at the age of 14 when her father disowned her for becoming pregnant and refusing to divulge the father's name (out of fear that her father would destroy Clive's life). Upon living in a jungle village, Weda started sporting a leopard-printed fur bikini and is always barefoot. She raised Hare in the jungle by herself which, due to her chronic irresponsibility, is quite difficult to fathom. She may have survived on the fact that she's a brilliant hunter (her hunting activity is one of a few times when Weda wears sneakers) and is second only to the Elder. Despite her flakiness, Weda does love her son very much and sometimes tries to give him advice and cook lunches for him. Unfortunately, she is a terrible cook and usually injures herself badly when she tries to cook anything but shrimp au gratin. She is extremely maternal despite her sometime immaturity, since she enjoys mothering Marie and Guu, is delighted to discover her second pregnancy, and tells Hare that if he vanished she would follow him anywhere. Weda's relationship with Dr. Clive is an odd one, since she seems to be very fond of him and bears him no ill will, but inexplicably seems to regard any romantic overtures as jokes. She seems to be unaware that Asio and Uighur are in love with her, and she regards the Stupid Couple with contempt and irritation. In the OVAs, she becomes pregnant with her second baby with Clive, and later marries Clive. After the marriage, she appears much less tolerant of Clive's skirt-chasing.

- Ame

Voiced by: Yuri Shiratori

Hare's baby brother who was born in the OVA Haré+Guu Deluxe, but has barely any significance in the story. His name comes from "Megumi no Ame" (Rain of Blessing), When Haré goes back in time and met up with the past Weda, he claimed that his name was Ame rather than Haré. When he got back in the present, Weda remembered the boy from the past while naming her 2nd child.

- Dr. Clive (クライヴ Kuraivu)

Voiced by: Mitsuaki Madono (Japanese); Liam O'Brien (English)

The doctor of the school, Dr. Clive is apathetic towards everyone in the jungle, unless they happen to be female. He came in from the city shortly after the series began, and had a 'relationship' with Weda while she was 14 years old, which, as Weda admits, resulted in Haré's birth. The anime and manga state that Dr. Clive is Haré's biological father but despite this, he engages in violent arguments with Haré (most of the time the center of it being Weda). Highly perverted, he uses every opportunity to "reignite his old relationship" with Weda, which usually end in failures until he chases after Weda when she leaves for the city. When Weda later becomes pregnant with their second child, this prompts the doctor to propose marriage at last. He has white hair when the series begins, but eventually Hare dyes it black so Dama will stop stalking him. In the anime, it is shown that Dr. Clive was an abused child with a highly perverted mom that hated him which may explain his promiscuity and his antipathy towards young boys. He is fond of Marie in a paternal manner, even wearing clothes she makes for him and telling her that her food is delicious. His body language and high-strung nature (as well as his awareness of Guu's weirdness) are very similar to Hare's.

=== Jungle villagers ===
- Pokute (ポクテ)

The Pokute are creatures abundant in the jungle that are often seen in people's houses. They look like armless rabbits with human faces. While it is said that Pokute were supposedly sent from the heavens as protectors, the villagers use them as a food source. No matter where they go in the world, the characters of this anime will always find pokute.

- Marie (マリィ)

Voiced by: Yuki Matsuoka (Japanese); Sandy Fox (English)

A girl who is a student of the school that Haré and Guu attend and Reiji-sensei's younger sister. Mari is friendly towards Haré (Later turning into a crush), and imagines herself as a tragic, shōjo manga-esque character. She really loves Weda because she never had the chance to have a mother, and pictures Dr. Clive (father figure) as a part of her family as well. She gets extremely jealous of Hare whenever he goes to the city, always imagining Hare hooking up with various women. Her love for Hare has become very aggressive. At the end of the series, she marries Hare.

- Reiji-sensei/Lazy-Sensei (レジィ) (Leiji)

Voiced by: Kazuhiko Inoue (Japanese); Kirk Thornton (English)

Reiji is the teacher at the school that Haré and Guu attend and is Marie's older brother. He's taken care of Marie since she was a child after their parents died, and once was very close to Weda when she first came to the Jungle with a newborn Hare. However, he was soon put off by her after taking care of her when she was drunk. He likes to stay up all night watching anime, so he falls asleep during the day. The school does not have many students so they all are in Reiji's class. Unfortunately Reiji would much rather rest than teach. In fact, the only "lesson" he seems to want to teach is "mid-morning siestas." Later in the manga, Rebecca is captured by her pokute family and Lazy rescues her, convincing the pokutes that Lazy is the right love for her, despite his trying to convince them otherwise, and in a sudden twist, becomes the pokute's leader (a position usually reserved for pokutes only).

- Chourou/Village Elder (ボーア)

Voiced by: Tesshō Genda (Japanese); Michael McConnohie (English)

Chourou is an old man with a lot of chest hair, which he feels is a sign of his strength and manliness. Adult Guu steals it and this is used as a plot device. (As a result of this he has taken to calling her "Lord Guu" and keeping a safe distance.) As the Village Elder, he leads the pokute (recurring and common creatures in the jungle) hunts, and has dozens of recipes in which pokutes are used. He falls in love with a cat that looks almost like him which he ends up giving to Hare (much to Hare's chagrin) and even disappears for a while when his chest hair growth goes out of control. By the end, he's merely a furball with a head. His chest hair later becomes a warp zone between his hair and a fuzzball in a closet in the city, in which Hare uses.

- Toposte (トポステ)

Voiced by: Konomi Maeda (Japanese); David Neil Black (English)

Toposte is the grandchild of Chourou and like him, does not wear a shirt. He initially does not have chest hair like his grandfather, though he fears it is genetic. He attends at the school. When he does ends up growing chest hair, he accepts it happily after learning that the chest hair is how Chourou got girls attracted to him back when he was young. In the city, he is mind controlled by his chest hair and takes over his new class, becoming an idol because of his chest hair. But he is saved by Hare and Guu when the chest hair is removed. When everyone returns to the jungle he is still being sought out by Yumi-sensei, but he eventually returns her feelings.

- Rebecca (レベッカ)

Voiced by: Takako Nakamura (Japanese); Melissa Fahn (English)

Rebecca is Weda's drinking friend who was raised by Pokutes that take care of her, even after she started living in the village. They have been revealed as the source of her "magically cleaning" house (of which she has no knowledge). She is used as a female stock character, filling out various roles as Weda's friend. Later, her Pokute family tries to take her away. Thanks to Hare, Guu, and Lazy-Sensei, she is saved from the Pokutes.

- Uigher/Wiggle (ウイグル)

Voiced by: Tetsuya Iwanaga (Japanese); Dave Wittenberg (English)

A boy who is one of the older students. The lack of influence he has on the storyline is occasionally used as a gag. He is madly in love with Weda, but never gets to prove his love, usually resulting in a comedic attempt to hang himself. Even after Weda marries Clive, he still fantasizes and pursues Weda. After they all decide to return from the jungle, he ends up staying in the city and six years later, became an assistant professor at the university.

- Gupta (グプタ)

Voiced by: Sōichirō Hoshi (Japanese); Richard Cansino (English)

A boy who is another upperclassman in the school. He is fairly impulsive but not particularly mature. Starts off with long blonde hair, gets it cut short and blackened when Dama first appears, then it grows back out to a brown color later. In the manga, it frequently shown that he is in love with Ravenna. In the manga, Guu swaps everyone's genders to teach Hare a lesson and later turns everyone back to normal, but makes no change to Gupta's gender, making everyone (except Hare) believe that Gupta is a girl since birth. He spends the rest of the series gender-swapped and continues to pursue his interest in Lavenna (who has become a boy), and their relationship works out so much better that Hare is convinced he would rather let them stay that way. At the end of the series when Guu disappears, he gets his original gender back, and becomes a teacher in the village school six years later.

- Waji (ワジ)

Voiced by: Daisuke Kishio (Japanese); Yuri Lowenthal (English)

An obnoxious student who always combines his speech with laughter, and tries to encourage Guu to do the same, to questionable results. He is sometimes found weeping in the forest for unknown reasons. Some theorize it is because his father beats him. At the end of the series, he finds work in the city.

- Ravenna (ラヴェンナ)

Voiced by: Yuri Shiratori (Japanese); Karen Strassman (English)

A girl who is the oldest female student in the school. She is a bit air-headed and unsure of herself. Completely lost in her own world as she fails to pay attention or care about events going on around her when she runs errands for her mom. She is in a relationship with Gupta, but when he went to the city and Guu made him a woman, it is still unsure whether or not Guu made her a man so the relationship stays the same. At the end of the series, she becomes a nurse.

- Rāya (ラーヤ)

Voiced by: Masayo Kurata (Japanese); Kari Wahlgren (English)

A reticent girl. Along with Sagin, she seems to be part of a running gag in the series as both of them never talk or are always interrupted when they are about to (Like when Haré asks for an answer from everyone, and the camera pans over everyone, skipping past Sagin and Rāya when he looked at them). She only speaks two phrases in the entire course of the anime series and OVAs- "The Crotch" and "Briefs".

- Chet and Addie

Chet Voiced by: Takahiro Yoshimizu (Japanese); Johnny Yong Bosch (English)
Addie Voiced by: Emi Uwagawa (Japanese); Michelle Ruff (English)

Dubbed the "stupid couple" by the village, they are a couple that have been madly in love with each other for the past few years. Chet claims to have come from England on a research trip only to stay in the jungle when he laid eyes on Addie. A running joke later in the series is that whenever Chet and Addie are together on screen, they're usually doing something that needs to be blurred out. The true story behind them is that Chet, ever since he was a child, wanted to go to the jungle. He got good grades in school and excelled all for the sake of being able to go there. When he got there, he was given a guide so he could find his way around. The guide was Addie. After touring around for a bit, she got very mad at him for hitting on her so much and she yelled at him and said she doesn't like him that way. But later to be nice, Chet goes to find his way in the jungle without help, where he gets sick and lost. Addie goes to find him and does, where seeing how far he would go for her happiness, she returned his feelings. While Hare and friends are in the city, Guu sometimes pulls the couple out of nowhere when they are needed. It is unsure whether or not this is because she currently holds them in her stomach.

- Yumi-sensei

Voiced by: Junko Minagawa (Japanese); Kate Higgins (English)

A substitute teacher that took over for Lazy while he was sick. Ironic since she absolutely hates children and has never had a boyfriend. Extremely short fuse. She exhibited a 1-way attraction to Hare after Hare was so nice and understanding towards her plight, and eventually breaks it off in the end to be with Toposte. In the end, her and Toposte end up becoming a couple.

- Dama

Voiced by: Chie Kōjiro (Japanese); Jessica Gee (English)

A hairdresser with an afro-style hair from a nearby village that became obsessed with her long-lost white-haired husband. Unfortunately, she mistakes Dr. Clive for her dead husband and even spins an elaborate fantasy life explaining why he doesn't know her. After spending most of the series stalking Clive, she is eventually told to live for new love and starts training her body to be in top shape. Dama later meets, fights, and marries the bank robber only to get seduced by an assassin later. After realizing she was only being used by the assassin, she resumes her happily married life with the bank robber. She is found by Hare in Guu's stomach on their most recent trip to the city. Dama's sister is Tama, whom she used to get along with but now they fight. The two merged once while fighting and Hare and Guu had to stop her. She was able to separate from the merged self and stop her sister. They now get along once again and work as a pair of singer and pianist at the bar her husband runs. Dama has a habit of acting and thinking (her thoughts are often narrated to Hare as a common break-the-fourth-wall comedy trick) very girlishly (usually seductively), which is strongly inappropriate for her old age and often exasperates Hare.

- Tama

Dama's twin sister who looks exactly like Dama, but with white skin. The two were close as children. But as they grew, Dama became more popular especially with their teacher as the two were teenagers. Tama and Dama were eaten by Guu and spent some time within her stomach in the RPG simulated world she created. In one story in the manga, the two sisters meet up, argue, and merge into a giant Dama/Tama monster that fights Hare, Guu, and the Hare and Guu from a short time in the future. She plays piano as her sister sings in the bar. Like her sister, Tama also exhibits very inappropriately (to Hare, sickeningly) girlish behaviors (and it's shown she thinks like one, as well), and harbors feelings for her brother-in-law, although her feelings is resolved after a talk with her sister. Hare eventually finds himself unable to stand their presences and soon quits his part-time job at their bar.

=== Guu's Stomach World inhabitants ===
- Tomoyo

Voiced by: Kyōko Hikami (Japanese); Kari Wahlgren (English)

One of three people living inside Guu's stomach world. A kind and friendly office lady, she does not seem to mind living inside of Guu. Seiichi and she are good friends and are even possibly a couple. She takes care of Haré's pet bird Hee after Guu eats him.

- Seiichi

Voiced by: Akira Ishida (Japanese); Steve Staley (English)

One of three people living inside Guu's stomach world. Like Tomoyo, he is a friendly high school boy who doesn't seem to mind living inside of Guu. He is good friends with Tomoyo and is even possibly her boyfriend.

- Hiroko Yamada/"Angry Yamada"

Voiced by: Ayumi Furuyama (Japanese); Julie Ann Taylor (English)

One of three people living inside Guu's stomach world who first appears in episode 8 of the TV series. She is a 22-year-old who attempted suicide by throwing herself into the ocean and was rescued by Guu, who swallowed her while fishing (and while bringing in a massive haul of various sea life, she technically didn't catch any fish). Unlike Seiichi and Tomoyo, Hiroko is mentally unstable and bipolar, making her dangerous and unpredictable. In fact, she tried to kill herself in an elaborate plot to take revenge on her cheating husband by dying, going through hell, and coming back as an evil spirit to haunt him for the rest of his life. She now spends most of her time in Guu's stomach world drinking alone on a hill, where most of the other inhabitants have now learned to avoid. Became fast-friends with Yumi-sensei when Guu had swallowed Yumi for a short time.

=== City inhabitants ===
- Asio (アシオ)

Voiced by: Ryōtarō Okiayu (Japanese); Sam Riegel (English)

A servant at Weda's parent's estate, he has very scary eyes (though it wasn't always the case, was stated to have beautiful eyes when he was younger). Loves Weda, but she thinks of him as a brother. He is often the one who goes to pick up Weda after nights where she had been drinking specifically heavily (revealed to be quite frequent due to Weda's habits). Often coming up with ideas that seem not to be possible, Haré is put off by him from their first meeting.

- Bell (ベル)

Voiced by: Mari Yokō (Japanese); Melodee Spevack (English)

Another servant, she is prone to gigantic nosebleeds when thinking of Weda as a child (this implies she has a perverted obsession with Weda). She and Asio have often been used to fill in the story of Weda's past. Though Weda is quite happy the two of them returned, their odd tendencies often frighten Haré, who is quite easily unbalanced by their (and Guu's) acts that seem to defy the laws of physics. She hates Clive with a passion, which works to Hare's advantage when he tries to keep Clive from wooing his mother. In the manga, Bell is a heterosexual drag queen. His clothes are chosen to draw attention away from his height, broad shoulders, & flat chest. When Weda was younger, he had shorter hair & dressed like a normal man.

- Sagin (サギン)

Voiced by: Shizuka Ishikawa (Japanese); Tony Oliver (English)

A reticent boy. Along with Rāya, he seems to be part of a running gag in the series as both of them never talk, or are always interrupted when they are about to (Like having a video interview with everyone, where when their turn came the camera switched to the next person immediately when they open their mouths).

- Robert

Voiced by: Shōtarō Morikubo (Japanese); Keith Silverstein (English)

Weda's trigger-happy bodyguard after she, Hare, and Guu go to the city. After graduating high school, he arrived in the city and was beat up one night, and was later found by Bel. It's because of her that he got his job. At first he doesn't get along well with Weda, saying that she wasn't worthy of Bel's love, but that changes after they foil a bank robbery. He may or may not have feelings for Bel (as episode 23 implies). In addition to being trigger-happy, he is a paranoid lunatic and once tried to kill a boy who bullied Hare causing him to ironically protect his own abuser from Robert. After Guu switched everyone's genders, it took her a while to change him back.

- Bank Robber Guy

Voiced by: Keiji Fujiwara (Japanese); Patrick Seitz (English)

A complete video game nerd who gets along with Hare due to their mutual love of video games. They'd be friends if he wasn't constantly taking Hare as a hostage. He eventually marries Dama after being bested by her in battle. He now runs a bar in the jungle.

- Rita

Voiced by: Naoko Takano

A self-centered girl around Hare's age that attends school in the city, who only cares about herself, and pleases others to not make enemies so she can get ahead in life. Hare ends up becoming her first true friend. She seems to eventually grow a serious love for Hare.

- Johan

A student that went to school with Haré and Guu in the city. He is secretly in love with Rita and usually beats up Hare for being so close to her. At first he is fat but when the group returns to the city later he lost a lot of weight. By the time Hare and everyone leaves the city, he has accepted Rita and Hare's "love."

- Bartholomew

Weda's older brother whom she believes to have sent hitmen to kill her in order to take her out of the family will. Later, it's revealed that the hitmen were sent by Bartholomew's son Alva, who was upset with his grandfather's will that left Weda a big portion of the family fortune, while Bartholomew is shown to be as loving as Weda remembers him. Bartholomew is actually happy that his father has forgiven Weda and written her into the family's will.

- Donna

Weda's older sister whom Weda believes to conspire with Bartholomew to send hitmen after her and Hare. The hitmen, however, were actually sent by Donna's nephew Alva, while Donna herself is happy with Weda's return to the family.

- Quincy Porter (QP)/Pretty

A very large, muscular bald man who everyone met on an island when their plane crashed on their way to the city. His name is meant to be very ironic. He first protected the gang when they were trapped on the island but he sometimes appears in the city when Guu pulls him out of nowhere. He and Robert have become rivals but later became friends. QP has a wife named Sera, with whom he has two daughters. He has five younger brothers and sisters: Sam, Simon, Sandora, and Sean, Samuel. They all look too alike that annoys Haré. He is currently a woman because of Guu and he/she works as a maid for Hare's grandmother's mansion. He's likely changed back after Guu disappears.

- IT 1

A black-haired man who shows no emotion. He is actually a human form of a cockroach, changed into human form by Guu to get Hare to stop being afraid of bugs.

- IT 2

The sister of the black-haired man. Neither show any emotion or compassion for anything, except for their home.

- Alex

The family's pilot who was bribed by Alva to crash Weda's plane and kill everyone. However, due to Alex's absent-mindedness, he forgets to plan his own escape route from said crashed plane, and has to befriends the Jungle clients to work their way to the main family (it's hinted that Alex earns his share by acting in gay porn movies). He is very childish and is never serious. He is sometimes referred to as a yankee because of the way he stands. Despite his carefree attitude, Alex is an unfortunate man who divorced thrice, was stripped from the right to see his two children. The two ex-wives sabotaged his last marriage by accusing him being gay.

- Shirley

Alex's friend who helped him with his assassination attempt. She is very shy and only ever opens up when it comes to Alex. It was because of her that Robert decided not to shoot the two when captured.

- Alva

Bartholomew's son and Hare's cousin, and the true mastermind behind the assassination plots aimed at Weda since he loved his father and was upset to see Bartholomew's share in the will being reduced due to Weda's presence. He ends up going with everyone back to the jungle. He is usually getting lost, causing him to be returned to home by a rather over-sized Pokute. At the end of the series, he succeeds his father's business and sends Hare gifts when his daughter is born.

- Angela

Alva's mother and a famous actress. However, he denies that he has one. The reason for this is clear when Angela first appears in Hare's village after Alva goes there and claims she would like him back with her to help her rehearse for a new role, and denies that she ever care for her son at all. However, a conversation with Weda has revealed that Angela is actually a tsundere and loves her son very much, despite always acting the opposite. She later returns to check on Alva and hires Hare as her guide, but stays in disguise through much of the visit as she doesn't want people to think she's there for her son. She has an assistant who is frequently seen by her side, and usually interprets her true feelings to people whenever her tsundere side makes her unable to say it.

- Margaret

Robert's acquaintance, the de facto leader of a famous group of female assassins. She's in charge of the intelligence, and uses her hacking ability to aid her comrades during missions. It's also shown that she has a photographic memory, and is able to recite the number of pi for as long as three to four days. Robert and Hare hires her group to rescue Robert's friend from an enemy assassination group. Afterwards, Margaret and her friends are revealed to have become romantically interested in Hare.

- Dandelion

An assassin of Margaret's group. She has the best fighting ability among them, and is deadly with knives.

- Dahlia

An assassin of Margaret's group. She is the physically strongest, and is able to burst a volleyball with her bare hand. She specializes in close-range combat.

- Chamomile

An assassin of Margaret's group, she appears to be still in school. She's a very proficient sniper.

- Cherry

An assassin of Margaret's group, she appears to be in kindergarten. She has vast chemical knowledge, and is good at making bombs and chemicals.

- Lloyd

One of Wiggle's roommates in college. Being the top grader of his year, grandson of the college's principal, heir of a doctor family-line, he is very snobby and is always taking his girlfriend out and buying her expensive gifts.

- Sarah

Another one of Wiggle's roommates. She is of the typical snobby teen girl type.

- Ann

Another one of Wiggle's roommates. She seems peppy and excited all the time, but she is actually very sad. She once kidnapped Hare in an attempt to gain a large sum of money from his grandmother to pay for her family's debt. But she is stopped and thanks to Hare is still excepted by everyone.

- Yuuki

Wiggle's last roommate. He is very quiet but nice. People usually avoid him though because he has a scary face.
