= Jonathan Fahn =

American actor

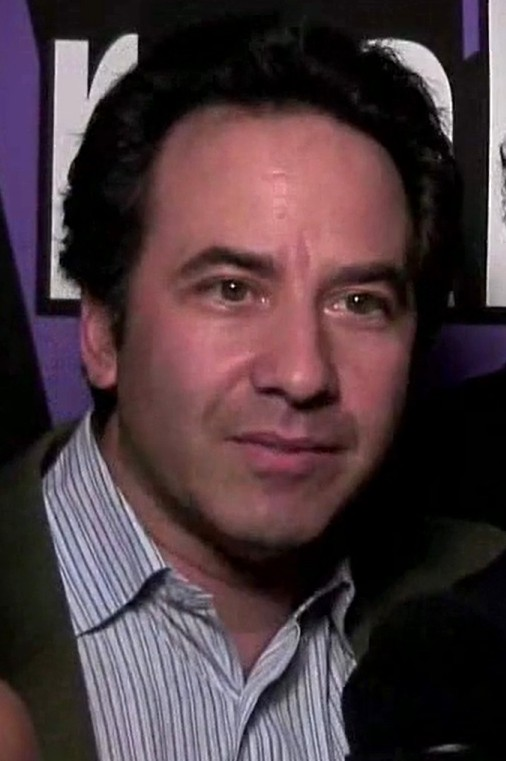
- Fahn in 2009
- Born: April 12, 1965 (age 61); Queens, New York
- Education: Edison High School (Huntington Beach, California); California State University at Long Beach
- Occupations: Voice/TV/Stage actor, director, writer, producer
- Spouse: Jennie Fahn
- Children: 2
- Relatives: Tom Fahn (brother); Melissa Fahn (sister); Mike Fahn (brother); Dorothy Elias-Fahn (sister-in-law)
- Website: jonathanfahn.com

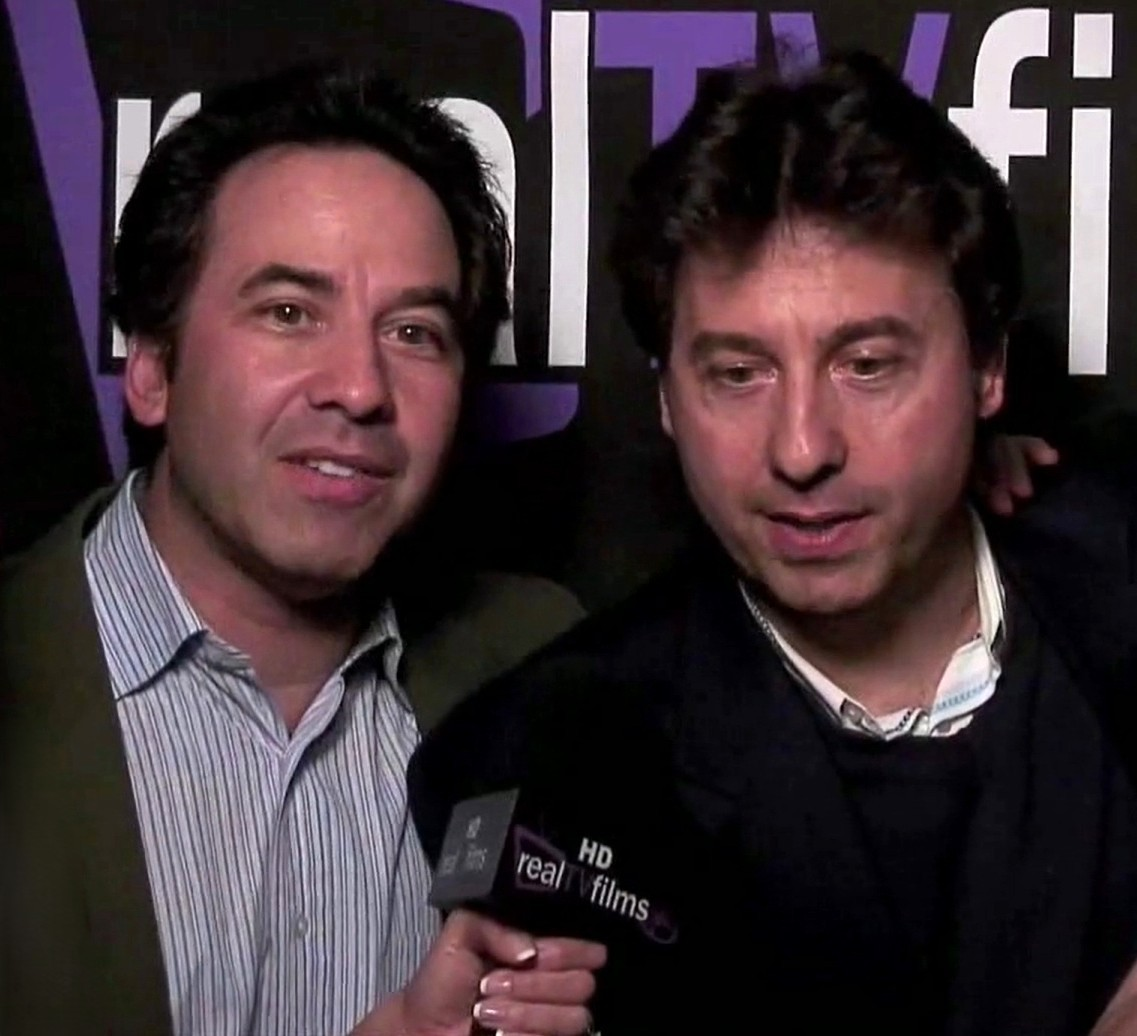
Left to right:Jonathan and Tom Fahn in 2009

Jonathan Fahn is an American voice actor, the brother of Melissa Fahn and Tom Fahn, the brother-in-law of Tom's wife, Dorothy Elias-Fahn, and the husband of Jennie Fahn.

== Filmography ==
=== Anime dubbing ===
- Ambassador Magma as Mamoru Murakami
- Battle Athletes Victory as Kannoji, Operator
- Blue Dragon as Marumaro's Father
- Cowboy Bebop as Miles
- Digimon Adventure 02 as Poi Brother #2
- Digimon Data Squad as Connor Shitori Demi-Devimon
- Forest of Piano as Jean Jacques Serrault
- Hyper Doll as Akai
- JoJo's Bizarre Adventure: Stardust Crusaders as Wilson Philips
- Mansquito as Detective Charlie Morrison
- Mobile Suit Gundam 0083: Stardust Memory as Scott
- Naruto as Shikaku Nara
- Naruto: Shippuden as Shikaku Nara
- Phantom Quest Corp as Higashi Narita
- Rurouni Kenshin as Ryuji
- The Super Dimension Century Orguss as Hardy
- The Super Dimension Fortress Macross II: Lovers, Again as Hibiki Kanzaki
- Trigun as Hoppered the Gauntlet
- Yu Yu Hakusho: The Movie (Media Blasters dub) as Yusuke Urameshi
- Zatch Bell! as British Gentleman, additional voices

=== Video games ===
- Naruto Shippuden: Ultimate Ninja Storm 3 as Shikaku Nara
- Naruto Shippuden: Ultimate Ninja Storm 4 as Shikaku Nara
- Naruto Shippuden: Ultimate Ninja Storm Revolution as Shikaku Nara
