= Tom Fahn =

American voice actor (born 1962)

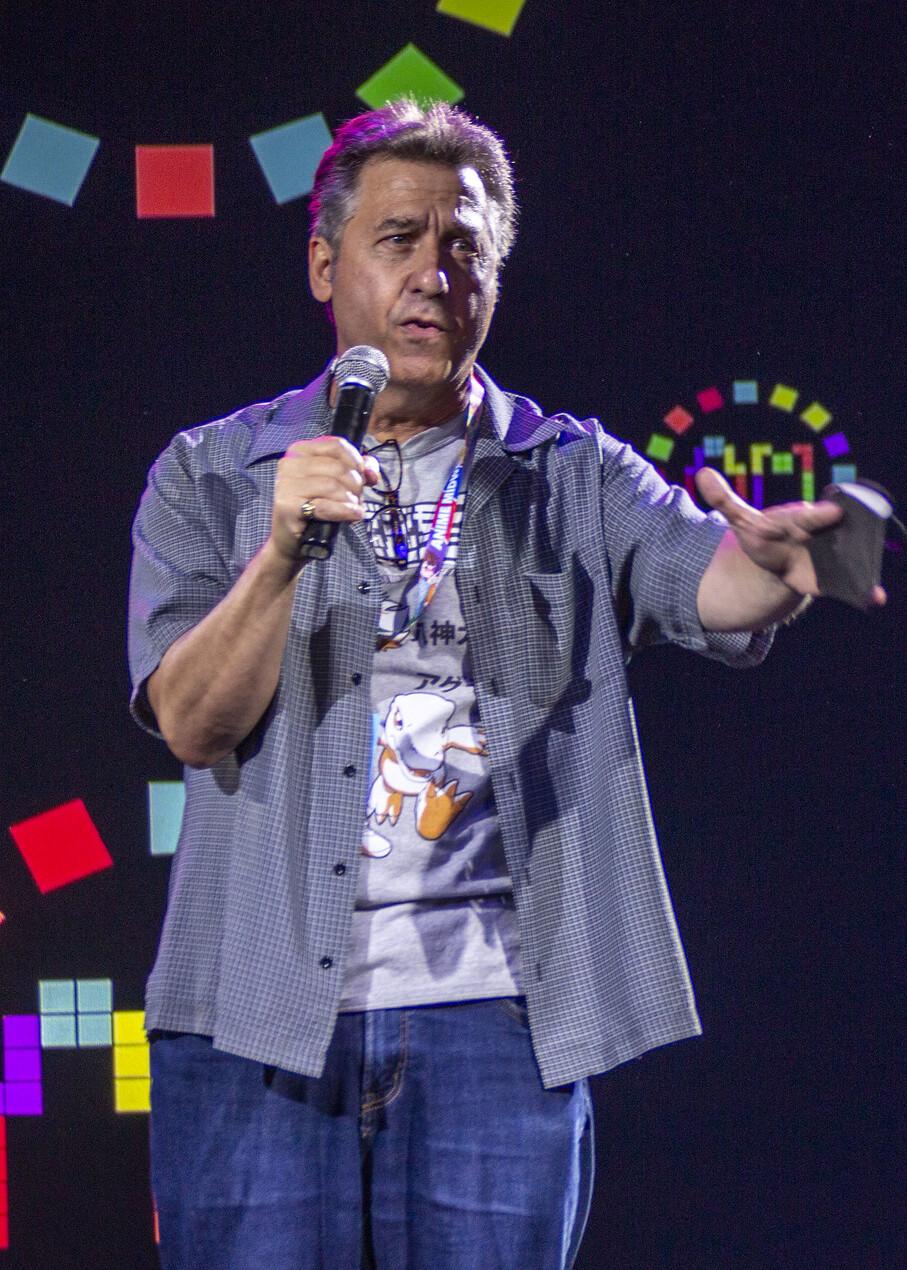
- Fahn in 2022
- Born: Thomas Fahn; April 30, 1962 (age 64); Queens, New York
- Occupation: Voice actor
- Spouse: Dorothy Elias-Fahn
- Children: 1
- Relatives: Jonathan Fahn (brother); Melissa Fahn (sister); Mike Fahn (brother)

Thomas Fahn (born 1962) is an American voice actor. He is known for his portrayals as Sho Fukamachi in Guyver and Agumon in the Digimon franchise.

== Personal life ==
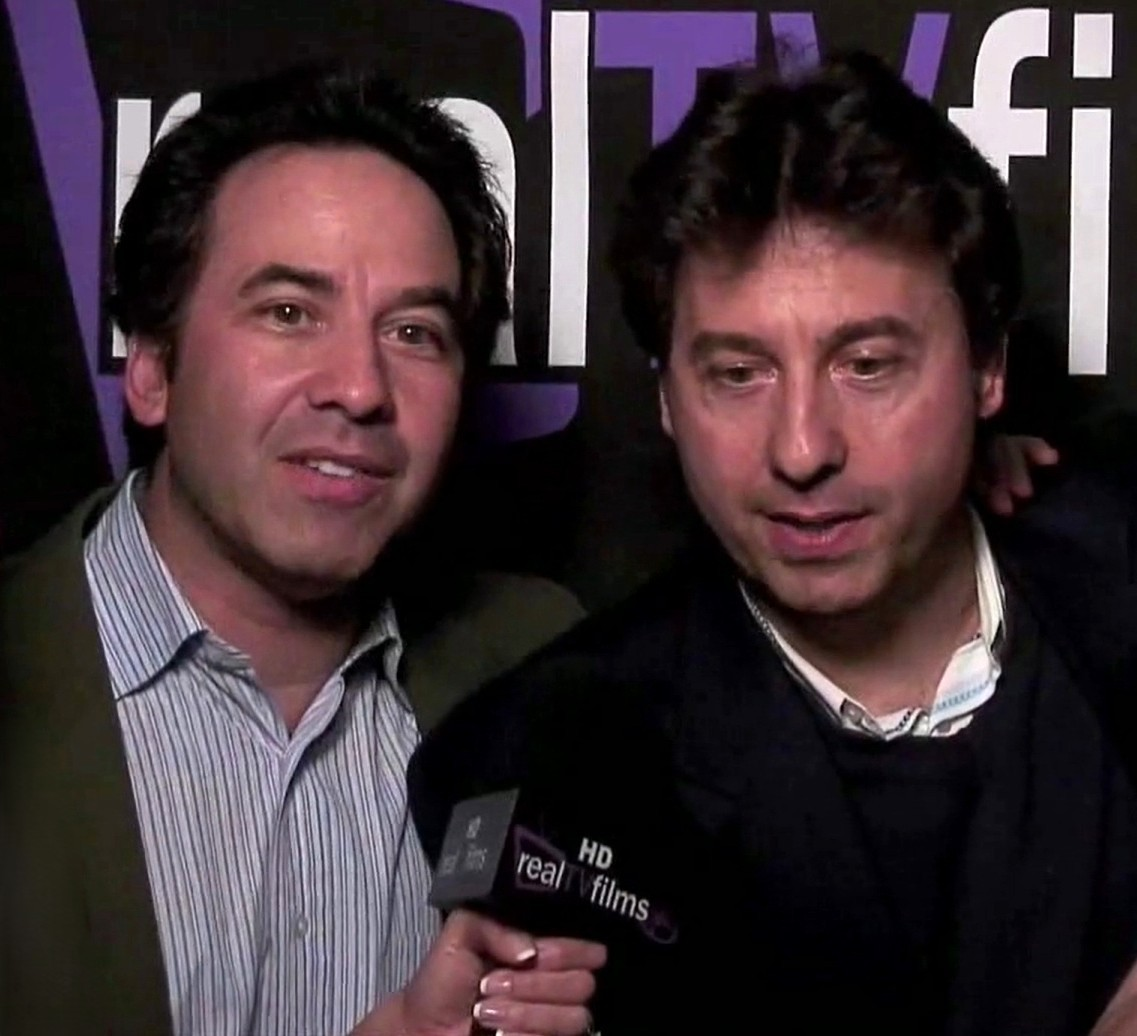
Left to right:Jonathan and Tom Fahn in 2009

His sister and brother, Melissa Fahn and Jonathan Fahn, respectively and wife, Dorothy Elias-Fahn, are also voice actors. His brother, Mike Fahn, is a jazz trombone player. Fahn is married to fellow actress Dorothy Elias-Fahn. They have one daughter.

== Filmography ==
=== Animation ===
- What a Cartoon! - Woim

=== Live action ===
- Big Bad Beetleborgs - Firecat (voice)
- Masked Rider - Dread Dragon (voice, uncredited)
- Mighty Morphin Power Rangers - Skelerena (voice, uncredited)
- Power Rangers: Lost Galaxy - Chameliac, Green Shark (voice)
- Power Rangers: Turbo - Count Nocturne, The Demon Racers, Wicked Wisher (voices, uncredited)
- VR Troopers - Trooper Terminator, Dream Master (voices)

=== Film ===
- Ice Age: The Meltdown - Stu, Male Ox (voice)
- The Adventures of Panda Warrior - Bruce Barkley
- The Even Stevens Movie - Gotcha! Father

=== Video games ===
- Digimon Rumble Arena - Agumon
- EverQuest II - Dirk Vagrin, Farnsby Dunwroth, Zenomaron Croosinaden, Ubani, Watchman Firececry, Armsdealer Froptub

== Dubbing roles ==
=== Anime ===
- Black Heaven - Michael Sato
- Black Magic M-66 - Ferris's Friend
- Bleach - Kano, Mizuiro Kojima
- Blood: The Last Vampire - Teacher
- The Big O - Eugene Grant
- Cowboy Bebop - Rocco Bonnaro
- Cosmowarrior Zero - Toichiro
- Digimon Adventure/Digimon Adventure 02 - Agumon, Digmon, Submarimon, Mantarou Inoue, Various
- Digimon Data Squad - Boxer Hayase Harris, DemiDevimon #3, Thug, Professor
- Digimon Tamers - Dolphin, Jijimon
- Digimon Frontier - Airdramon, Datamon, Centarumon, Pteramon
- Flint the Time Detective - Leafy, Super Ninja
- Giant Robo - Prof. Franken Von Folger
- Great Teacher Onizuka - Mutoh
- Guyver - Sho Fukamachi
- Hunter × Hunter 2011 series - Buhara (uncredited), Kiriko (Eps. 2, 13)
- JoJo's Bizarre Adventure - Wired Beck
- JoJo's Bizarre Adventure: Stardust Crusaders - J. Geil/Centerfold (uncredited)
- Kekkaishi - Daigo Todoroki, Masahiko Tsukijigoaka, Youkyokusai
- Kyo Kara Maoh! - Josak Guiere, Gunter Von Christ (Season 2)
- Marmalade Boy - Sakai
- Naruto Shippuden - Natori
- One Punch Man - Crablante
- Outlanders - Tetsuya Wakatsuki (L.A. Hero dub)
- Reign: The Conqueror - Ptolemy (Eps. 5–13)
- Shinzo - Hakuba
- The Super Dimension Century Orguss - Kei Katsuragi
- Tenchi Muyo! GXP - Alan

=== Live action ===
- Violetta - Rafa Palmer

=== Film ===
- Condorito: la película - Condorito
- Digimon: The Movie - Agumon, Digmon
- Digimon: Revenge of Diaboromon - Agumon
- Digimon Adventure tri. - Agumon
- Digimon Adventure: Last Evolution Kizuna - Agumon
- Digimon Adventure: Our War Game! (standalone dub) - Agumon, Additional Voices
- Digimon Adventure 02: Digimon Hurricane Touchdown!! / Transcendent Evolution! The Golden Digimentals (standalone dub) - Digmon
- Ice Age: The Meltdown - Stu, Male Ox
- NiNoKuni - Zeelok Doctor 2

=== Video games ===
- Digimon ReArise - Agumon
- Digimon Rumble Arena - Agumon
- Twin Mirror - Walter
