= Noein =

2005 science fiction anime television series

- Key visual

ノエイン もうひとりの君へ (Noein: Mō Hitori no Kimi e)
- Genre: Adventure; Drama; Science fiction
- Created by: Kazuki Akane; Satelight
- Anime television series
- Directed by: Kazuki Akane
- Produced by: Atsushi Yamamori; Hiroshi Kawamura; Tsutomu Kasai
- Written by: Kazuki Akane; Hiroshi Ōnogi
- Music by: Masumi Itō
- Studio: Satelight
- Licensed by: Crunchyroll: UK: Anime Limited
- Original network: Chiba TV
- English network: AU: ABC2; PH: TV5; US: Sci Fi
- Original run: October 12, 2005 – March 29, 2006
- Episodes: 24

Noein: To Your Other Self (Japanese: ノエイン もうひとりの君へ, Hepburn: Noein: Mō Hitori no Kimi e), also known simply as Noein, is a Japanese science fiction anime television series directed by Kazuki Akane and produced by Satelight. The series has 24 episodes which make up a complete storyline. The English version was produced and dubbed by Manga Entertainment.

== Summary ==
Fifteen years in the future, a violent pan-dimensional war is taking place between the two dominant "time-spaces" of the universe. These are La'cryma, a possible future of our own world, and Shangri-La, another possible dimension fifteen years after ours, intent on the destruction of all space and time. The key to stopping Shangri'la's invasion and saving reality is a mysterious object known as the "Dragon Torc" (竜のトルク, Ryū no Toruku). La'cryma's elite military force, known as the "Dragon Cavalry", is sent through space and time to find it.

In one possible present, twelve-year-old Haruka and her friend Yū Gotō are contemplating running away from home when they meet a member of the Dragon Cavalry named Karasu, who is a possible Yū from the future. La'cryma believes that Haruka is the Dragon Torque, but Karasu vows to protect her rather than sacrifice her for his home dimension. Other than the Dragon Cavalry, Haruka is targeted by the mysterious Noein, the entity behind Shangri'la who is intent on bringing her into his timespace to end all universes.

== Production ==
Noein is set in the Japanese port city of Hakodate, Hokkaido. The animators took care to recreate the city's buildings, port, and environments.

== Characters ==
=== Present timeline ===
Haruka Kaminogi (上乃木ハルカ, Kaminogi Haruka)
Voiced by: Haruka Kudō (Japanese); Melissa Fahn (English)
Haruka is the central protagonist of the anime. She is 12-years-old and was born in Tokyo, but moved with her mother when she was 8 to Hakodate to live in her mother's childhood home. Haruka is a very fast runner and acts very mature for a girl her age.
Asuka Kaminogi (上乃木明日香, Kaminogi Asuka)
Voiced by: Akemi Okamura (Japanese); Mona Marshall (English)
Haruka's 38-year-old mother. She moved with Haruka back to her hometown of Hakodate after her divorce from Takuya.
Takuya Mayuzumi (黛拓也, Mayuzumi Takuya)
Voiced by: Kenta Miyake (Japanese); Steve Kramer (English)
Haruka's 41-year-old father. He is a prominent scientist in the field of quantum physics and one of the founders of the Magic Circle Project, which aims to control the flow of spacetime.
Yū Gotō (後藤ユウ, Gotō Yū)
Voiced by: Fujiko Takimoto and Kazuya Nakai (at age 17) (Japanese); Yuri Lowenthal (English)
In the present timespace, he is one of Haruka's classmates and best friends, and one of the main protagonists of the anime. Yu is 12-years-old, and he, unlike other students, is being forced by his mother Miyuki to go to cram school in order to pass a provincial enrollment test and go to a Tokyo junior high.
Miyuki Gotō (後藤美有樹, Gotō Miyuki)
Voiced by: Atsuko Tanaka (Japanese); Ellyn Stern (English)
Yū's 38-year-old mother, who is very strict about Yū's school work.
Ai Hasebe (長谷部アイ, Hasebe Ai)
Voiced by: Saeko Chiba (Japanese); Dorothy Elias-Fahn (English)
In the present timespace, she is another of Haruka's classmates and one of her best friends. Ai is 12-years-old, and is a stubborn, hot-headed and tough tomboy. She is an expert in soccer, and she has a crush on Isami that doesn't initially seem to be reciprocated.
Isami Fujiwara (藤原イサミ, Fujiwara Isami)
Voiced by: Kōki Miyata and Kōhei Kiyasu (at age 17) (Japanese); Bryce Papenbrook (English)
He is another one of Haruka's friends in the present timespace. Isami is 12-years-old, and lives with his older brother Tsuyoshi, younger sister Fumiko, and grandmother, as their parents both recently died. He appears to be tough on the outside but has a fear for ghosts, and he is constantly nagging Yū about being a "mama's boy" and never doing anything but study and go to cram school.
Miho Mukai (向井ミホ, Mukai Miho)
Voiced by: Kaori Nazuka (Japanese); Lara Cody (English)
In the present timespace, she is a close friend and classmate of Haruka, Yū, Isami, and Ai. Miho is 12-years-old, and is a very chipper bespectacled girly-girl who's obsessed with ghosts, aliens, UFOs, Ouija, and the paranormal and supernatural in general.
Ryōko Uchida (内田涼子, Uchida Ryōko)
Voiced by: Sayaka Ohara (Japanese); Cindy Robinson (English)
She is a 27-year-old quantum researcher for the Magic Circle Project.
Kyōji Kōriyama (郡山京司, Kōriyama Kyōji)
Voiced by: Keiji Fujiwara (Japanese); Richard Epcar (English)
He is Ryōko's 39-year-old partner, acting as her personal driver and bodyguard while she researches quantum phenomena.
Yukie Nijou (二条雪恵, Nijō Yukie)
Voiced by: Mai Nakahara (Japanese); Cindy Robinson (English)
She is the 24-year-old teacher to Haruka and her group of friends. She does not seem to get along with Ryōko, and Isami has an obvious crush on her. Miss Yukie is also prone to reckless driving. Family-wise, she mentions in episode 2 that her mother lives in the area, but she's never seen.
Makoto Shinohara (篠原真琴, Shinohara Makoto)
Voiced by: Shunsuke Sakuya (Japanese); Yuri Lowenthal (English)
He is a 35-year-old scheming and corrupt corporate leader who will stop at nothing to make sure the Magic Circle Project is carried out, as he is the majority shareholder in it when Dr. Mayuzumi resigned and was paid out from it six months earlier. Shinohara is not above making threats or physical violence to make sure things go in his favor. After the timespaces separate, he was last seen on the floor in handcuffs. He was apparently arrested for attempted murder for shooting Kooriyama, and assaulting Dr. Mayuzumi.
Mariko Mukai (向井真理子, Mukai Mariko)
Voiced by: Fumi Oda (Japanese); Dorothy Elias-Fahn (English)
Miho's mother. Like her daughter, she wears glasses and they both share the same spiritual obsessions.
Tsuyoshi Fujiwara (藤原剛, Fujiwara Tsuyoshi)
Voiced by: Hiroyuki Yoshino (Japanese); Richard Cansino (English)
Isami's older brother. A stereotypical dumb high school jock.
Baron (バロン, Baron)
Haruka's Great Pyrenees.
Tono (トノ, Tono)
Haruka's black and white cat.
Clara (クララ, Kurara)
Miho's Dachshund.
Aya Maeda (前田あや, Maeda Aya)
Voiced by: Yōko Honda (Japanese); Stephanie Sheh (English)
One of Haruka's best friends and classmates when she lived in Tokyo.
The Time Drifter (時の放浪者, Toki no Hourousha)
Voiced by: Hikaru Miyata (Japanese); Steve Kramer (English)
This mysterious figure appears only to Haruka as an old man with a wide-brimmed hat that covers most of his upper face with the exception of one eye. He gives both cryptic (though often useful) advice and warnings to Haruka. Near the end of the series, he transforms into the Ouroboros.

=== La'cryma ===
Gokan (ゴカン, Gokan)
Voiced by: Fumi Oda (Japanese); Dorothy Elias-Fahn (English)
Member of the Supreme Council.
Enra (エンラ, Enra)
Voiced by: Daisuke Ono (Japanese); Steve Kramer (English)
Member of the Supreme Council.
Taiza (タイザ, Taiza)
Voiced by: Daisuke Kirii (Japanese); Eddie Frierson (English)
Member of the Supreme Council.

==== Dragon Knights ====
Karasu (カラス, Karasu)
Voiced by: Kazuya Nakai (Japanese); Crispin Freeman (English)
Karasu, the Japanese word for crow, is the 27-year-old version of Yū in the future timespace of La'cryma and one of the protagonists of the anime.
Fukurō (フクロウ, Fukurou)
Voiced by: Kōhei Kiyasu (Japanese); R. Martin Klein (English)
He is the 27-year-old version of Isami in the same future timespace as Karasu. Fukurō is Japanese for owl.
Atori (アトリ, Atori)
Voiced by: Kenichi Suzumura (Japanese); Eddie Frierson (English)
A 22-year-old Dragon Knight of Middle Eastern descent and whose name is Japanese for finch, he resembles a tall, skinny man with bulging purple eyes, dark lips, and a long point of blond hair that hangs over his face, as well as gray/silver spirals that almost resemble the bolts on the neck of Frankenstein's Monster.
Kosagi (コサギ, Kosagi)
Voiced by: Takako Honda (Japanese); Cindy Robinson (English)
The 25-year-old second in command of the Dragon Knights, whose name is Japanese for egret, she turned her love toward Karasu to hatred due to his perceived betrayal.
Tobi (トビ, Tobi)
Voiced by: Ryoko Shiraishi (Japanese); Lara Cody (English)
Tobi is a 21-year-old Dragon Knight who mastered the technical side of the future timespace whose name is Japanese for kite. Although weak in combat, Tobi is proven to be an invaluable member of the knights. Tobi is male in the original Japanese version, although for unknown reasons he is given a female voice and referred to as such in the English dub.
Isuka (イスカ, Isuka)
Voiced by: Kenta Miyake (Japanese); Steve Kramer (English)
He is a 28-year-old Dragon Knight who accompanied Atori and Tobi in leaving La'cryma.
Kuina (クイナ, Kuina)
Voiced by: Rikiya Koyama (Japanese); Richard Cansino (English)
He is the 32-year-old leader of the Dragon Knight Squad, and was the only member to remain on La'cryma. Kuina is Japanese for rail. He had feelings for Kosagi, but his affections were not returned.

==== Other La'cryma inhabitants ====
The following characters also reside in La'cryma:

Amamiku (アイ・アマミク・ハセベ, Ai Amamiku Hasebe)
Voiced by: Saeko Chiba (Japanese); Dorothy Elias-Fahn (English)
La'cryma's 27-year-old version of Ai. She works as a science officer for the Supreme Council in the Dragon Knight's main base.
Lily (リリ, Riri)
Voiced by: Kaori Nazuka (Japanese); Lara Cody (English)
Lily is Miho's 7-year-old daughter in La'cryma. She helps Haruka when she asks for a route to the surface and finds a place for Haruka and Yū to hide when the Dragon Knights are after them.
Haruka Kaminogi (上乃木ハルカ, Kaminogi Haruka) of La'cryma
Voiced by: Haruka Kudō (Japanese); Melissa Fahn (English)
The 22 year old Haruka of the La'cryma dimension is never seen in the present, only in flashbacks.

=== Shangri-La ===
Noein (ノエイン, Noein)
Noein Masked Voiced by: Kazuya Nakai (Japanese); Richard Epcar (English)
Noein Unmasked Voiced by: Kazuya Nakai (Japanese); Crispin Freeman (English)
Noein is another Yū from a different timespace where he survived the car crash that killed Ms. Yukie, Isami, and Ai and in which he had to endure watching a bloody Haruka be killed in the ensuing explosion. Unable to bear the pain of losing her, Noein decided to look for a new Haruka in a different timespace.
The Others (あざす, The Others)
Male Others Voiced by: Richard Epcar
Female Others Voiced by: Cindy Robinson
They are the residents of Shangri'la. They all were originally residents of other space-times who desired to live in Noein's world, discarding their bodies and existing as merely a collective consciousness that reluctantly serves as an extension of Noein's will. They appear to be able to take a limited form of a metallic dragon/seahorse shape with one ribbon like arm that ends in a hand. When Noein dies, his minions leave his body to return to their own worlds.

== Episodes ==
No.	Title	Directed by (Note: Production staff information is taken from the ending credits of each episode.)	Written by	Storyboarded by	Animation directed by	Original release date	English air date
1	"Blue Snow"; Transliteration: "Aoi Yuki" (Japanese: アオイユキ)	Kenji Yasuda	Kazuki Akane	Kazuki Akane	Satoru Nakaya	October 12, 2005	June 18, 2007
During summer break, a couple of friends decide to play a test of courage by hunting down a rumored ghost that is supposedly appearing throughout the city. During their quest, Haruka starts seeing something that her friends are unable to see, blue snow. Two friends in the present must now help freedom fighters from the future battle the evil dimension Shangri-La. With the help of a group known as the Dragon Cavalry, Haruka and Yuu travel through space and time to save the universe from imminent destruction.
2	"Runaway"; Transliteration: "Iede" (Japanese: イエデ)	Hiroyuki Tsuchiya & Kenji Yasuda	Kazuki Akane	Kenji Yasuda	Kensuke Ishikawa	October 19, 2005	June 25, 2007
Haruka may be in a bit more trouble than she expected. It is not only the two dragon knights that are battling right in front of her face. Yuu is thinking about running away to Tokyo, and Haruka promised she would go with him. In their attempts to run away, the supernatural just keeps on popping up everywhere they go.
3	"Hunted"; Transliteration: "Owarete..." (Japanese: オワレテ…)	Kiyoshi Matsuda	Hiroaki Kitajima	Yasuhiro Matsumura & Katsuyuki Kodera	Atsushi Okuda	October 26, 2005	July 2, 2007
Atori still pursues both Haruka and Yuu, though Karasu is heavily injured due to upholding the task of saving Haruka and Yuu, and battling Atori. Karasu however, got stuck in the present time-space, and who else but Haruka finds him.
4	"Friends"; Transliteration: "Tomodachi" (Japanese: トモダチ)	Naoki Horiuchi	Kazuharu Sato	Takeshi Mori	See note for the ADs (Note: Shinsuke Terasawa, Haruo Sotozaki, Masahiro Sekiguchi, Akira Takata, Yukari Kobayashi, Hiroaki Kawaguchi, Kanji Nagasaka & Usaku Myouchin)	November 2, 2005	July 9, 2007
Some misunderstanding is created between Haruka's and Isami's relationship that causes some inner hatred from Ai. Now, it seems Haruka has to weld it back together again.
5	"And Then..."; Transliteration: "Sorekara..." (Japanese: ソレカラ…)	Mamoru Enomoto	Hiroshi Ōnogi	Tsukasa Sunaga	Masahiko Komino & Rika Mishima	November 9, 2005	July 16, 2007
Atori, Tobi, and Isuka, travel onto the present time-space in order to destroy Haruka.
6	"Dimension of Tears"; Transliteration: "Namida no Jikū" (Japanese: ナミダノジクウ)	Takayuki Tanaka	Hiroaki Kitajima	Takayuki Tanaka	Satoru Nakaya, Masahiko Komino, Mitsuru Sōma, Akira Takata & Rika Mishima	November 16, 2005	July 23, 2007
Haruka is taken to La'cryma. She managed to escape and mix herself up with the residents at the local town. When she reaches the surface, she notices many similar things related to her world.
7	"Precious Person"; Transliteration: "Taisetsu na Hito" (Japanese: タイセツナヒト)	Kiyoshi Matsuda	Hiroaki Kitajima	Kenji Yasuda	Kensuke Ishikawa	November 23, 2005	August 6, 2007
Haruka is finally being used by La'cryma for their own diabolical reasons, but Karasu has other plans.
8	"Secrets"; Transliteration: "Kakushigoto" (Japanese: カクシゴト)	Shigeki Hatakeyama	Miya Asakawa	Katsuyuki Kodera	Yoshiko Imazato	November 30, 2005	August 13, 2007
Haruka returns to her present time-space and invites Karasu to live with her after he unplugged his pipeline. Though little did she expect she would get involved with Yuu's relationship problems with his mother.
9	"Beyond Time"; Transliteration: "Toki o Koete" (Japanese: トキヲコエテ)	Hiroyuki Yokoyama	Miya Asakawa	Atsushi Wakabayashi	Mariko Aoki	December 7, 2005	August 20, 2007
Yuu's mother causes a disruption in time-spaces, which causes her to wander down in memory lane. It is up to Haruka to use her powers and save her.
10	"A Stormy Night"; Transliteration: "Arashi no Yoru" (Japanese: アラシノヨル)	Mamoru Enomoto	Kazuharu Sato	Yasuaki Kurotsu & Atsushi Wakabayashi	Toshiya Washida & Toshimitsu Kobayashi	December 14, 2005	August 27, 2007
Atori makes one final attempt to destroy the Dragon Torc, but is stopped by Karasu. However, Atori is not the only one who wants Haruka.
11	"Out of Sync"; Transliteration: "Surechigai" (Japanese: スレチガイ)	Kenji Yasuda	Hiroshi Ōnogi	Takayuki Tanaka	Masahiro Sekiguchi (Note: Layout director) & Yoshiko Okuda (Note: Key animation director)	December 21, 2005	September 3, 2007
Yuu has decided to make it his goal to study in Tokyo, but Isami is in disagreement with him. Fukurou and Karasu are preparing themselves for a similar type of fight.
12	"The Battle"; Transliteration: "Tatakai" (Japanese: タタカイ)	Takayuki Tanaka	Kazuharu Sato	Kazuhiro Furuhashi	Hiroshi Ōkubo & Norio Matsumoto	December 28, 2005	September 17, 2007
Haruka's worse nightmare comes true; Karasu and Fukurou start their dreadful battle, and she does not even know where to find them.
13	"The Wish"; Transliteration: "Negai" (Japanese: ネガイ)	Kiyoshi Matsuda	Hiroaki Kitajima	Atsushi Wakabayashi	Masahiko Komino & Rika Mishima	January 11, 2006	September 24, 2007
Karasu has been severely injured as a result of the previous battle. Haruka and Tobi see to it that he gets the proper amount of Layze to heal himself, but Kosagi does her best to prevent it from happening.
14	"Memories"; Transliteration: "Kioku" (Japanese: キオク)	Yūji Yanase	Miya Asakawa	Tsukasa Sunaga	Mariko Aoki	January 18, 2006	October 2, 2007
Haruka visits various time-spaces in the space to see moments within her parents' past through the old telephone that hangs below the stairs.
15	"Shangri-La"; Transliteration: "Shanguri-Ra" (Japanese: シャングリラ)	Yasuhito Kikuchi	Hiroshi Ōnogi	Tsukasa Sunaga	Yūichi Takahashi	January 25, 2006	October 2, 2007
Haruka goes on her date with her dad, but it's cut a little short due to work. Though she is asked out on another date by the all-knowing being Noein.
16	"Repeat"; Transliteration: "Kurikaeshi" (Japanese: クリカエシ)	Mamoru Enomoto	Kazuki Akane	Kazuki Akane	Takahiro Kishida, Tomoyuki Niho & Ryo-timo	February 1, 2006	October 9, 2007
Haruka goes down through memory lane, but gets herself literally stuck in the past.
17	"Dilemma"; Transliteration: "Mayoi" (Japanese: マヨイ)	Norio Kashima	Miya Asakawa	Norio Kashima	Futoshi Fujikawa	February 11, 2006	October 9, 2007
Ai's parents are going to have their wedding ceremony, and Haruka is going to attend it, but she is stopped by Kosagi, who came to finish off what she had started before.
18	"Nightmare"; Transliteration: "Warui Yume" (Japanese: ワルイユメ)	Kenji Yasuda	Hiroaki Kitajima	Tsukasa Sunaga	Masahiro Sekiguchi & Rika Mishima	February 15, 2006	October 16, 2007
Haruka found an old video when she was younger. She looks around the town to find a tape that could hopefully play it, but in the process of it all, raiding units from Shangri-la have appeared, and Kuina has exploited his allegiance to Shangri-la.
19	"Reminiscence"; Transliteration: "Omoide" (Japanese: オモイデ)	Takayuki Tanaka	Hiroshi Ōnogi	Takayuki Tanaka & Kenji Yasuda	Satoru Nakaya & Hideki Yamazaki	February 22, 2006	October 16, 2007
Haruka deals with the concept of forgetting, as her memories of her grandmother are disappearing, and an old friend she had in Tokyo is unable to recognize her.
20	"Once More"; Transliteration: "Mō Ichido..." (Japanese: モウイチド…)	Mamoru Enomoto	Kazuharu Sato	Shōji Kawamori	Masahiko Komino	March 1, 2006	October 23, 2007
Yuu and Haruka were transported to La'cryma, and were quickly met by the heads of the Dragon Knights. Thanks to Haruka, the two were able to escape. However, Yuu mysteriously disappears off into Shangri-la.
21	"Illusion"; Transliteration: "Maboroshi" (Japanese: マボロシ)	Kiyoshi Matsuda	Miya Asakawa	Hiroyuki Morita	Akira Takata	March 8, 2006	October 23, 2007
Haruka agrees to submit herself to Noein in order to save Yuu and Karasu. Mysteriously, her house and her friends have appeared within the misty grasses of Shangri-la.
22	"To the Future"; Transliteration: "Mirai e..." (Japanese: ミライヘ…)	Yasuhito Kikuchi	Kazuharu Sato	Shinichirō Watanabe	Satoru Utsunomiya, Yūichi Takahashi & Atsushi Irie	March 15, 2006	November 13, 2007
Noein tries to manipulate Haruka into bending her will into his desires by showing her, through Ai, Isami, and Miho, the future they would have had if it remained untouched.
23	"The End"; Transliteration: "Owari" (Japanese: オワリ)	Norio Kashima	Hiroshi Ōnogi	Kenji Yasuda & Takayuki Tanaka	Nobuteru Yūki	March 22, 2006	November 13, 2007
Noein reveals his identity to Haruka, and shares with her his views on life, as well as how his sorrow originated. The Magic Circle Project is also swinging into full motion.
24	"The Beginning"; Transliteration: "Hajimari" (Japanese: ハジマリ)	See note for directors (Note: Kazuki Akane, Kenji Yasuda, Takayuki Tanaka, Kiyoshi Matsuda & Mamoru Enomoto)	Kazuki Akane & Hiroshi Ōnogi	Kazuki Akane, Kenji Yasuda & Takayuki Tanaka	Masahiro Sekiguchi (Note: Partial animation director)	March 29, 2006	November 20, 2007
Noein has possessed Haruka's abilities as a dragon torc, though Yuu and Karasu come to her rescue.

== Distribution ==
- Sci Fi began airing Noein in the United States as part of its Ani-Monday programming block on June 18, 2007.
- In Australia, Noein was first broadcast on free-to-air-TV on ABC2 (the national digital public television channel) from 7:30 pm on Tuesday 21 August 2007, and concluded on Tuesday 29 January 2008. Repeat airing began from 6:00 pm on Sunday 26 August 2007, and concluded on Sunday 3 February 2008. Repeats began again, airing double episodes from 12:30 pm Sunday 10 February 2008, and concluded on Sunday 11 May 2008.
- In the Philippines, TV5 started its broadcast on November 10, 2008.
- In Italy, Rai 4 started broadcasting the series free-to-air on September 30, 2012.

== Home media releases ==
Manga Entertainment originally licensed the anime in the North America and UK/Ireland territories, while Madman Entertainment has licensed it for Australia and New Zealand. The series was released on a total of six discs. In 2008, Manga re-release the series in a complete box set. On July 25, 2015, Funimation announced their license to Noein and re-released the series on Blu-ray on January 12, 2016. Anime Limited have acquired the series for a UK release.

== Music ==
The two original soundtracks are composed by Hikaru Nanase.

- Noein Original Soundtrack Vol.1 / LACA-5460
- Noein Original Soundtrack Vol.2 / LACA-5491

Opening Theme:

- "Idea" performed by Eufonius

Ending Theme:

- "Yoake no Ashioto" (夜明けの足音) performed by Solua
