= Melissa Fahn =

American actress

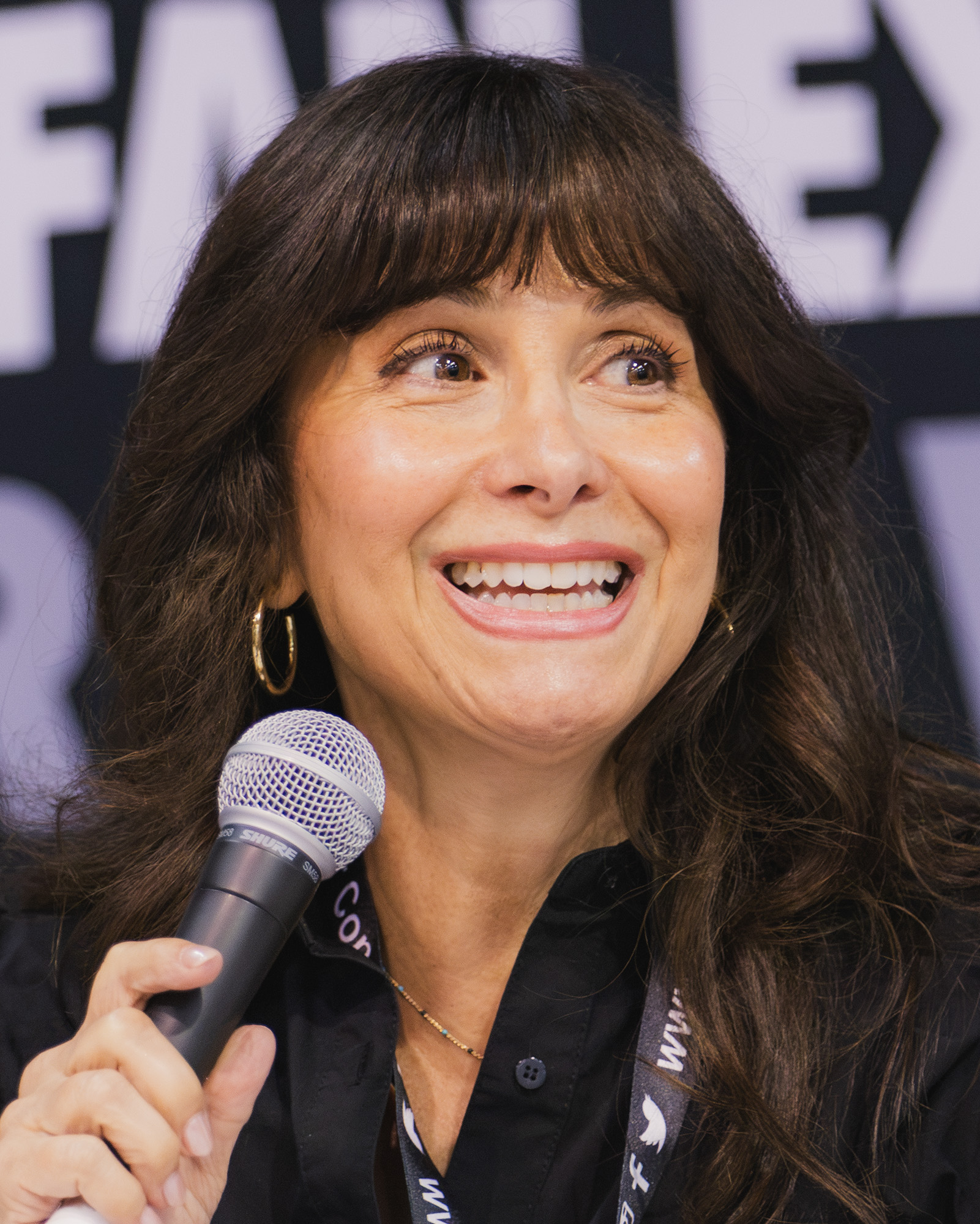
- Fahn in 2026
- Born: Long Island, New York
- Other names: Melissa Charles; Tina Dixon
- Education: Edison (Huntington Beach, California)
- Occupations: Actress; singer
- Years active: 1985–present
- Agent(s): Arlene Thornton and Associates
- Spouse: Joel Alpers (m. 2002)
- Relatives: Tom Fahn (brother); Jonathan Fahn (brother); Mike Fahn (brother); Dorothy Elias-Fahn (sister-in-law)
- Musical career
- Instrument: Vocals

Melissa Fahn is an American actress, best known as the voice of Gaz Membrane in the Nickelodeon animated series Invader Zim, Dendy in the Cartoon Network animated series OK K.O.! Let's Be Heroes, Hello Kitty in Hello Kitty's Paradise, as well as voicing many anime and video game characters like Himawari Uzumaki from Boruto, Radical Edward from Cowboy Bebop, Silver Wolf in Honkai: Star Rail, Neptune from Hyperdimension Neptunia, and Rider and her various other incarnations in the Fate stay/night franchise. She starred in the Broadway performance of Wicked and various theatre projects in Los Angeles.

== Early life and education ==
Fahn was born in Long Island, New York to Michael and Millie Fahn. She is the youngest of four siblings. She began dancing at the age of 3. Her family moved to Huntington Beach, California. Her father, a jazz drummer, encouraged her to branch out into singing and acting. She performed in community theater productions and toured with Young Americans. She majored in dance at California State University, Long Beach but left after one year.

== Career ==
While working as a receptionist, her voice caught the attention of a casting director for a new Betty Boop featurette, which led to her first voice-over role in The Betty Boop Movie Mystery. Fahn has voiced many animated characters, Edward in Cowboy Bebop, Haruka in Noein, Gaz as well as others in Invader Zim, and Rika Nonaka, Kristy Damon and Nene Amano in Digimon. She is the voice of Neptune in the Hyperdimension Neptunia series.

She performed live on stage worldwide in shows such as Hal Prince's 3hree, Gilligan's Island the Musical, Singin' in the Rain, No, No, Nanette and the rock-operas of Vox Lumiere.

In 2007, Fahn released her music album Avignon which was produced by her husband, Joel Alpers. Her brother Tom plays trombone, her sister-in-law Mary Ann McSweeney plays bass and Alpers plays drums and percussion.

=== Wicked ===
Fahn was a member of the ensemble in the original Broadway cast of Stephen Schwartz's musical Wicked. In March 2004, Fahn became an understudy for the role of Glinda, replacing Melissa Bell Chait who had suffered a minor stroke. Fahn departed the show on October 31, 2004. She later became an original cast member of the Los Angeles sit-down productions, performing in the ensemble and again understudying the role of Glinda before departing on December 30, 2007.

== Personal life ==
Fahn has three older brothers: Mike Fahn is a musician, while Tom Fahn and Jonathan Fahn are fellow voice and stage actors. In 2000, Fahn met musician Joel Alpers in Los Angeles, and they wed at Kauai, Hawaii, in 2002. In 2025, Fahn's home was destroyed by the Palisades Fire.

== Filmography ==
=== Animation ===
List of voice performances in animation
Year	Title	Role	Notes	Source
1989	The Betty Boop Movie Mystery	Betty Boop		Resume
1991	The Ren & Stimpy Show	Cindy, Debra, Lady, Girl		Resume
1998	The Wild Thornberrys	Katrina	Episode: "On the Right Track"	
2001–02	Invader Zim	Gaz Membrane, others		
2002	Zentrix	Akina		Resume
2009	Gormiti	Jessica	Season 1	Press
2017–19	OK K.O.! Let's Be Heroes	Dendy		
2019	Pucca: Love Recipe	Ching		
2020–present	Miraculous: Tales of Ladybug & Cat Noir	Duusu		

=== Anime ===
List of English dubbing performances in anime
Year	Title	Role	Notes	Source
1992	Super Dimension Fortress Macross II: Lovers, Again	Amy	As Melissa Charles	CA
1992–93	Guyver OVAs	Mizuki Segawa	As Melissa Charles; Also Guyver II	CA
1993	Moldiver	Mao Shirase	As Melissa Charles; OVA	CA
1995	Black Magic M-66	Ferris	As Melissa Charles	
1995	Phantom Quest Corp	Nanami Rokugou	As Melissa Charles; OVA	CA
1995–99	El-Hazard series	Alielle, others	Voice acting as Melissa Charles under El-Hazard Talent; English Vocal for theme song "Clever" in Wanderers as Melissa Fahn	CA
1997	Tokyo Revelation	Kiyoko	As Melissa Charles; OVA	CA
1998–2000	Fushigi Yuugi series	Nyan Nyan	As Melissa Charles	CA
1999	Cowboy Bebop	Radical Edward	As Melissa Charles	
1999	Jungle de Ikou!	Natsumi, Mei		CA
1999	Mobile Suit Gundam 0080: War in the Pocket	Dorothy	As Melissa Charles	CA
2000	Hello Kitty's Paradise	Hello Kitty		
2000	Apocalypse Zero	Megumi	As Melissa Charles; OVA	CA
2000	Arc the Lad	Shante, others	As Melissa Charles	CA
2000	Black Heaven	Psychic Bell Ringer	As Melissa Charles	CA
2000	Magic Knight Rayearth 2	Tarta & Tatra	As Melissa Charles	CA
2000	Panda! Go, Panda!	Panny		CA
2000	FLCL	Eri Ninamori	As Heather Lee Joelson	Press
2001	Samurai Girl Real Bout High School	Nanako Hishinuma	As Tina Dixon	
2001	Blood: The Last Vampire	Linda	OVA	CA
2001	Digimon Tamers	Rika Nonaka/Sakuyamon (Shared With Mari Devon)		
2001	Gate Keepers	Specs	As Melissa Charles	CA
2001	Mezzo Forte	Mikura Suzuki	As Tina Dixon	CA
2001	Mobile Suit Gundam: The 08th MS Team	Karen (Child)	As Melissa Charles	CA
2001	Nightwalker	Asami Akiba, Monique	As Melissa Charles	CA
2001	Vampire Princess Miyu	Lilith, Shizuko, Mei-Fah	TV series	CA
2002	Vandread series	Amarone Slainthiev	As Tina Dixon	CA
2002	Digimon Frontier	Narrator		CA
2003	Gun Frontier	Various characters	As Tina Dixon	CA
2003	Idol Project	Corvette Hyers	As Tina Dixon	CA
2003	Kikaider	Etsuko Sarutobi		CA
2003	Love Hina Again	Kanako Urashima	As Tina Dixon	CA
2003	Lupin III: Part II	Marianne, Party Guest		CA
2003	Mahoromatic	Chizuko Oe	As Tina Dixon	
2003	Please Teacher!	Kaede Misumi		CA
2003	s-CRY-ed	Cammy, Girl at Party, Chuka		CA
2003	Sakura Wars: The Movie	Orihime Soletta	As Tina Dixon	CA
2003	Wild Arms: Twilight Venom	Michelle Fran	As Tina Dixon	CA
2004	Burn-Up Scramble	Various characters	As Tina Dixon	CA
2004	Kaze no Yojimbo	Miyuki Tanokura		CA
2004	Sakura Taisen: Sumire	Orihime Soletta	As Tina Dixon	CA
2004–05	Ghost in the Shell: Stand Alone Complex series	Tachikoma	Also 2nd Gig, Tachikomatic Complex	CA
2005	Gankutsuou: The Count of Monte Cristo	Various characters	As Tina Dixon	CA
2006–07	Haré+Guu	Rebecca	As Tina Dixon	
2005	Le Portrait de Petit Cossette	Woman (Mistress)	As Tina Dixon; OAV series	CA
2005	Mars Daybreak	Vestamona "Vess" Lauren		CA
2005	New Getter Robo	Ruby, Lab Staff	As Tina Dixon	CA
2005	Samurai Champloo	Various characters	As Tina Dixon	CA
2005	Skyhigh	Sayuri Toyama	As Tina Dixon	CA
2005	Tenjho Tenge	Mana Kuzunoha	As Tina Dixon	CA
2005	Zatch Bell!	Tia		
2006	Karas	Chizuru		CA
2006	Noein	Haruka Kaminogi		CA
2006	Paradise Kiss	Miwako Sakurada	As Jolie Jackson	CA
2007	Digimon Data Squad	Kristy Damon		CA
2007	Blue Dragon	Bouquet		
2008	Stitch!	Sasha/Ani/Young Lilo		Press
2013	Digimon Fusion	Nene Amano		
2013	Hyperdimension Neptunia: The Animation	Neptune		Press
2014	Knights of Sidonia	Izana Shinatose		Press
2015	Fate/stay night: Unlimited Blade Works	Rider/Medusa		
2015	Glitter Force	Theresa	Netflix series	
2017	Glitter Force Doki Doki	Clara Yotsuba/Glitter Clover	Netflix series	
2018	Boruto: Naruto Next Generations	Himawari Uzumaki		
2018	Lost Song	Finis		
2019	Fate/Grand Order: First Order	Lancer/Medusa		
2019	Fate/Grand Order - Absolute Demonic Front: Babylonia	Ana, Gorgon, Tiamat		
2020–22	Ghost in the Shell: SAC 2045	Tachikoma		
2020	My Next Life as a Villainess: All Routes Lead to Doom!	Maria Campbell		
2022	JoJo's Bizarre Adventure: Stone Ocean	The Green Baby		

=== Film ===
List of English dubbing performances in feature, direct-to-video and television films
Year	Title	Role	Notes	Source
1999	Mobile Suit Gundam: The Movie Trilogy	Fraw Bow	As Melissa Charles	CA
2001	Ah! My Goddess: The Movie	Sora Hasegawa	As Melissa Charles	CA
2002	Cowboy Bebop: The Movie	Edward	As Melissa Charles	
2005	Digimon Tamers: Battle of Adventurers	Rika Nonaka		
2005	Digimon Tamers: Runaway Locomon	Rika Nonaka/Sakuyamon		
2017	Boruto: Naruto the Movie	Himawari Uzumaki		
2018	Sailor Moon S: The Movie	Princess Snow Kaguya	Viz media version	
2018	Fate/stay night: Heaven's Feel I. presage flower	Rider/Medusa		
2019	Promare	Biar Colossus		
2019	Fate/stay night: Heaven's Feel II. lost butterfly	Rider/Medusa		
2019	Invader Zim: Enter the Florpus	Gaz Membrane		
2021	Violet Evergarden: The Movie	Additional Cast		
2021	Fate/stay night: Heaven's Feel III. spring song	Rider/Medusa		

=== Video games ===
List of voice performances in video games
Year	Title	Role	Notes	Source
2002	Digimon Rumble Arena	Rika Nonaka		
2006	God Hand	Conchita, Villains, Villagers		
2008	Star Ocean: First Departure	Welch Vineyard		
2008	SpongeBob SquarePants Featuring Nicktoons: Globs of Doom	Gaz Membrane		
2009	Star Ocean: Second Evolution	Welch Vineyard		
2010	Sakura Wars: So Long, My Love	Rosarita Aries		
2011–present	Hyperdimension Neptunia series	Neptune		
2011	Nicktoons MLB	Gaz Membrane		
2013	Fire Emblem Awakening	Maribelle		Press
2013	Rune Factory 4	Frey	Also Special	
2016	Star Ocean: Integrity and Faithlessness	Welch Vineyard		
2016	World of Final Fantasy	Chocochick		
2017	Fire Emblem Heroes	Tana, Maribelle		
2018	OK K.O.! Let's Play Heroes	Dendy		
2019	Steven Universe: Unleash the Light	Demantoid		
2021	Tower of Fantasy	Ene		
2022	Star Ocean: The Divine Force	Welch Vineyard		
2023	Honkai: Star Rail	Silver Wolf		
2023	Nickelodeon All-Star Brawl 2	Gaz Membrane		
2026	Mega Man Star Force Legacy Collection	Luna Platz		

=== Theater ===
List of acting performances in theater
Year	Title	Role	Notes	Source
2003	Wicked	Ensemble Soloist, Glinda (understudy)	Original Broadway production, Los Angeles production	

=== Live action television and film ===
List of acting performances in film and television
Year	Title	Role	Notes	Source
	Passions	Young Esmerelda		Resume
1993	Beverly Hills 90210	Student in Black	Ep. "Emily"	
	Head of the Class	Stephanie		Resume
	The Eddie Files	The Waitress		Resume
	Fast Food	Cookie	short film	Resume
	A Night at the Roxbury			Resume
	The Last Day			Resume
1989	Say Anything...			Resume
	Cast a Deadly Spell			Resume
1988	Salsa	Featured Dancer		Resume
	Zombie Prom	Studio singer		Resume
2011	Tick Tock Boom Clap	Sara		Press

== Discography ==
- Avignon (2007)
