= Dorothy Elias-Fahn =

American voice actress

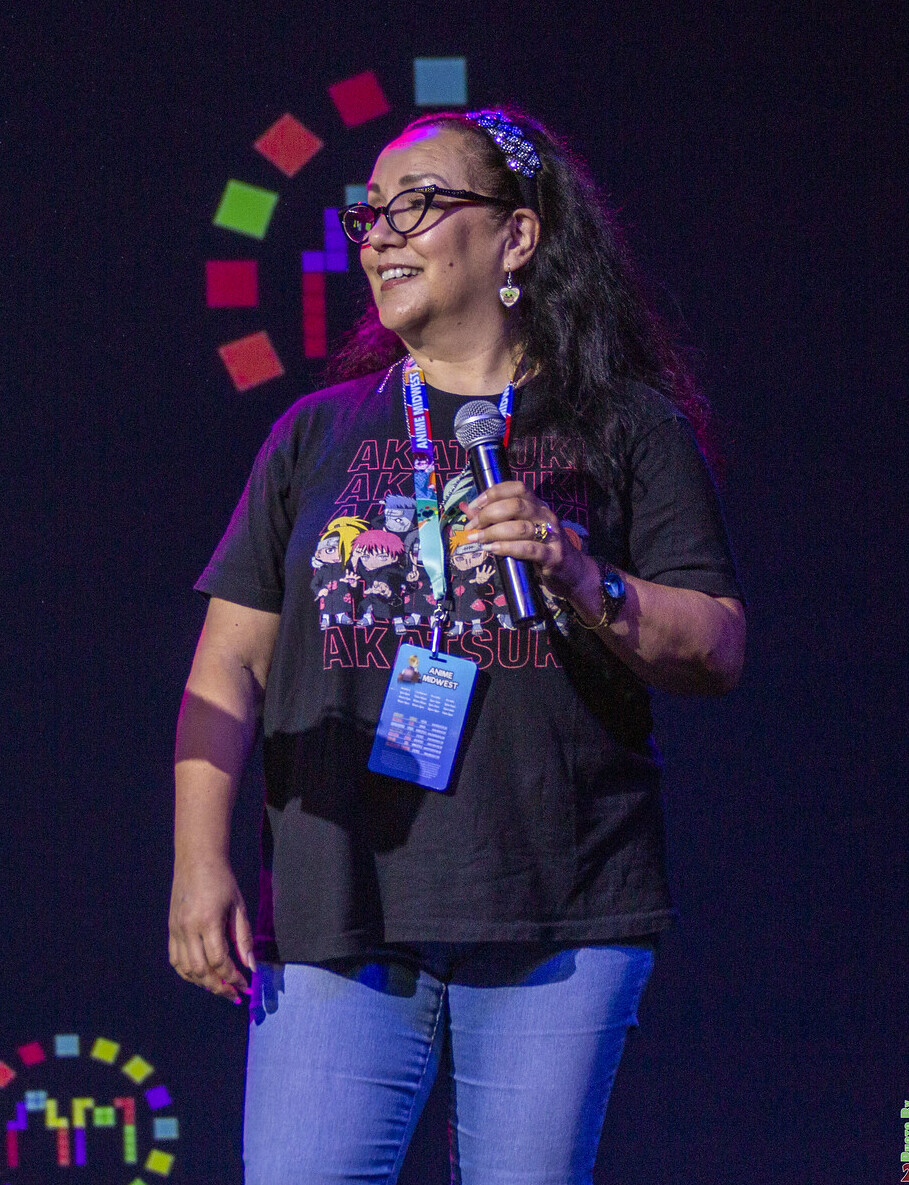
- Elias-Fahn in 2022
- Born: March 13, 1962 (age 64); Los Angeles, California, U.S.
- Other names: Dorothy Melendrez; Johanna Luis
- Education: California State University at Long Beach
- Occupation: Voice actress
- Years active: 1990–present
- Agent: Coast To Coast Talent
- Spouse: Tom Fahn
- Children: 1
- Relatives: Jonathan Fahn (brother-in-law); Mike Fahn (brother-in-law); Melissa Fahn (sister-in-law)
- Website: dfahn0.wixsite.com/website

Dorothy Elias-Fahn (born 1962), formerly known as Dorothy Melendrez, is an American voice actress. Some of her prominent lead roles include Meryl Stryfe in Trigun, Sayaka Maizono, Chihiro Fujisaki, and Tsumugi Shirogane from the Danganronpa series, Kamiya Kaoru in Rurouni Kenshin, Naru Narusegawa in Love Hina, Tomoe Kashiwaba in Rozen Maiden, Nina Purpleton in Mobile Suit Gundam 0083, Chizuru Minamoto in Kanokon and Konan in Naruto: Shippuden.

== Personal life ==
Elias-Fahn is married to fellow actor Tom Fahn. They have one daughter. She is the sister-in-law of voice actors Jonathan Fahn and Melissa Fahn.

== Filmography ==
=== Animation ===
List of voice performances in animation
| Year | Title | Role | Notes | Source |
|---|---|---|---|---|
| 2003 | The Night B4 Christmas | Evilina | TV special | |
| 2004 | Game Over | Tiffany, Brandy | | |
| 2009–10 | LeapFrog DVDs | Lily | | Press |
| 2013 | Lego Friends: Dolphin Cruise | Sasha | | |
| 2024 | Cosmic Dawn | Princess Tiatha | as Dorothy Fahn | |

=== Video games ===
List of voice performances in video games
| Year | Title | Role | Notes | Source |
|---|---|---|---|---|
| 2001 | Fear Effect 2: Retro Helix | Rain Qin | as Dorothy Melendrez | |
| 2015 | Fallout 4 | Brotherhood Soldiers, Vault-Tec Staff | | |

== Dubbing roles ==
=== Anime ===
List of English dubbing performances in anime
| Year | Title | Role | Notes | Source |
|---|---|---|---|---|
| 1992 | Macross II | Enesh, Nexx Fan | As Dorothy Melendrez | CA |
| 1993 | Outlanders | Momo | Animaze dub As Dorothy Melendrez | CA |
| 1994 | Moldiver | Agt. Vivien | OVA; As Dorothy Melendrez | CA |
| 1995 | Macross Plus | Airport Announcer, SDF-1 Bridge Officer, Ghost Ship Officer, others | OVA; As Dorothy Melendrez | CA |
| 1995 | Super Dimension Century Orguss | Shaya Thoov, others | OVA; As Dorothy Melendrez | |
| 1995 | Armitage III | Kelly McCannon | OVA; As Dorothy Melendrez | CA |
| 1995 | Phantom Quest Corp. | Tea House Girl 2, Hospital Worker | OVA; As Dorothy Melendrez | CA |
| 1995–98 | El-Hazard series | Miz Mishtal | As Dorothy Melendrez | CA, Press |
| 1997 | Street Fighter II: V | Additional voices | As Dorothy Melendrez | CA |
| 1998 | Fushigi Yûgi | Miaka's classmate, Korin's attendant | As Dorothy Melendrez | CA |
| 1998 | Battle Athletes | Kris Christopher | As Dorothy Melendrez | CA, Press |
| 1998 | Mobile Suit Gundam 0083: Stardust Memory | Nina Purpleton | As Dorothy Melendrez | |
| 1999 | Battle Athletes Victory | Kris Christopher | As Dorothy Melendrez | CA |
| 1999 | Cowboy Bebop | Space Gate | As Dorothy Melendrez | CA |
| 1999 | Mobile Suit Gundam 0080: War in the Pocket | Al's teacher | As Dorothy Melendrez | CA |
| 1999 | Outlaw Star | Hamushi | As Dorothy Melendrez | CA |
| 1999 | Saber Marionette J Again | Yumeji | As Dorothy Melendrez | CA |
| 1999 | Serial Experiments Lain | Teacher | As Dorothy Melendrez | CA |
| 1999–2000 | Digimon Adventure series | Lilymon, Yuko Kamiya | | |
| 2000 | Magic Knight Rayearth 2 | Nova, Kuu Hououji | As Dorothy Melendrez | CA |
| 2000–02 | Rurouni Kenshin series | Kamiya Kaoru, others | TV series Bang Zoom! Entertainment/AnimeWorks dub As Dorothy Melendrez | CA, Press |
| 2000 | Fushigi Yûgi | Houki, others | OVA and OVA2; As Dorothy Melendrez | CA |
| 2000 | Arc the Lad | Lieza, Barkeeper | As Dorothy Melendrez | |
| 2000 | Sol Bianca: The Legacy | Public announcement | As Dorothy Melendrez | CA |
| 2000 | Trigun | Meryl Stryfe | As Dorothy Melendrez | CA, Press |
| 2001 | The Big O | Louise Ferry | As Dorothy Melendrez | CA |
| 2001 | Mobile Suit Gundam: The 08th MS Team | Village merchant, Sally | As Dorothy Melendrez | CA |
| 2001 | Vampire Princess Miyu | Miyu Yamano | TV series As both Dorothy Melendrez and Dorothy Fahn | CA |
| 2001 | Saint Tail | Various characters | Grouped as Additional Voices | |
| 2001 | Zenki | Anju | As Dorothy Melendrez | CA |
| 2001 | Hand Maid May | Cyberdoll Mami | As Dorothy Melendrez | CA |
| 2001 | Nightwalker | Riho Yamazaki | As Dorothy Melendrez | CA |
| 2001 | Digimon Tamers | Mayumi Wong, Babamon, Curly, Harpymon | | |
| 2001–02 | Vandread series | Parfet Balblair, Celtic Midori, others | As Dorothy Melendrez | CA |
| 2002 | Fushigi Yugi: Eikoden | Yotaigo, Houki | OVA; As Dorothy Melendrez | CA |
| 2002–03 | Love Hina series | Naru Narusegawa | As Dorothy Melendrez | |
| 2002 | Mobile Suit Gundam: The 08th MS Team: Miller's Report | Sally | As Dorothy Melendrez | CA |
| 2002 | Digimon Frontier | Poyomon, TorikaraBallmon, Floramon | | |
| 2002 | The Twelve Kingdoms | Yōko Nakajima | | Press |
| 2002 | Tokyo Pig | Mom | | |
| 2002 | Tsukikage Ran | Omiyo, Townswoman | | CA |
| 2003 | Gun Frontier | Sanae, Mistress, Mrs. Utamaro, Shizuku | As Dorothy Melendrez | CA |
| 2003 | Iron Virgin Jun | Maid | OVA | CA |
| 2003 | Argento Soma | Maki Agata, Tsinober, Narrator, others | | CA |
| 2003 | Wild Arms | Sybil, Thief B | | CA |
| 2003 | Kikaider | Reporter, Woman in Car | | CA |
| 2003 | If I See You in My Dreams | Ms. Misaki | | CA |
| 2003 | S-CRY-ed | Mimori Kiryu | | CA |
| 2003 | Witch Hunter Robin | Various characters | | CA |
| 2004 | Rave Master | Claire Maltese, Rosa | | CA |
| 2004 | Ghost in the Shell: Stand Alone Complex | Sano | | CA |
| 2004 | Sakura Taisen: Sumire | Ri Kohran | OVA; As Dorothy Melendrez | CA |
| 2004–05 | Grenadier | Tenshi | as Dorothy Melendrez | CA |
| 2005 | Bobobo-bo Bo-bobo | Suzu | | |
| 2005 | Saiyuki Reload | Stuffed animal | | CA |
| 2005 | Zatch Bell! | Djem's mother, Djem | | CA |
| 2005 | Tenjho Tenge | Nurse | | CA |
| 2005 | Planetes | Yuri's wife, Noppo | | CA |
| 2005 | Scrapped Princess | Colette, Carol Cassul, Jewelry seller | | CA |
| 2006–12 | Bleach | Misato Ochi | | |
| 2006 | Requiem from the Darkness | Various characters | | |
| 2006 | Lupin III Part II | Baby | As Dorothy Fahn | |
| 2006 | Kannazuki no Miko | Reiko, others | As Dorothy Fahn | |
| 2006 | Karas: The Prophecy | Yoshihiko Sagisaka | | CA |
| 2006 | Saiyuki Reload Gunlock | Reika | | CA |
| 2006 | Noein: To Your Other Self | Ai Hasebe, others | | CA |
| 2007 | Tokko | Yukino Shiraishi, Mrs. Shindo, Reporter | | CA |
| 2007–11 | Rozen Maiden series | Tomoe Kashiwaba, Matsu Shibasaki | | |
| 2007 | Flag | Saeko Shirasu | | CA |
| 2007 | Digimon Data Squad | Lalamon, Sunflowmon, Lilamon, Rosemon | | |
| 2008 | Lucky Star | Matsuri Hiiragi, others | | |
| 2009 | Naruto: Shippuden | Konan | | Tweet |
| 2010 | Kekkaishi | Toshimori Sumimura | | CA |
| 2011 | Kanokon | Chizuru Minamoto | | |
| 2013 | B-Daman Crossfire | Rudy Sumeragi, Asuka Fan 1 | As Johanna Luis | |
| 2014 | Kill la Kill | Maiko Ogure | | Website |
| 2014 | Rock Lee & His Ninja Pals | Sakura | As Johanna Luis | |
| 2014-15 | JoJo's Bizarre Adventure: Stardust Crusaders | Nena, The Empress, Jotaro Kujo (Young) | | |
| 2015 | Yuki Yuna is a Hero | Students | As Johanna Luis | |
| 2015 | Charlotte | Tomori's Mother | | |
| 2015 | Miraculous: Tales of Ladybug & Cat Noir | Caline Bustier | Credited under Additional Voices | Tweet |
| 2015–17 | Sailor Moon | Natsumi Ginga/An, Cyprine, Ptilol | Viz Media dub as Johanna Luis | |
| 2015 | Sword Art Online II | Kyoko Yuki/Erika | as Johanna Luis | |
| 2015 | Fate/stay night: Unlimited Blade Works | Kane Himuro | TV series | |
| 2016 | Mob Psycho 100 | Hanako | | |
| 2016–17 | Kuromukuro | Marina Unami | | |
| 2017 | Hunter x Hunter | Senritsu (Melody) | 2011 series | |
| 2018 | Devilman Crybaby | Taro Makimura | | |
| 2018 | Violet Evergarden | Nerine | As Johanna Luis | |
| 2019 | Demon Slayer: Kimetsu no Yaiba | Kie Kamado | As Dorothy Fahn | |
| 2020 | Arte | Arte's Mother | As Dorothy Fahn | |
| 2021 | To Your Eternity | Pioran | As Dorothy Fahn | Tweet |
| 2021 | Yashahime: Princess Half-Demon | Fūta | As Dorothy Fahn | |
| 2021 | Komi Can't Communicate | Shūko Komi | Netflix | |
| 2022 | Lupin III Part 6 | Diner Waitress | As Dorothy Fahn | Tweet |
| 2023 | KonoSuba: An Explosion on This Wonderful World! | Yuiyui | As Dorothy Fahn | |
| 2024 | The Grimm Variations | Tsuruko Otawara | As Dorothy Fahn | |
| 2025 | Blue Box | Yukiko Inomata | As Dorothy Fahn | |

=== Film ===
List of English dubbing performances in direct-to-video and television films
| Year | Title | Role | Notes | Source |
|---|---|---|---|---|
| 1994 | Royal Space Force: The Wings of Honnêamise | Woman on Phone | Animaze dub As Dorothy Melendrez | CA |
| 1996 | They Were Eleven | Toto Ni | As Dorothy Melendrez | CA |
| 1997 | Armitage III: Poly-Matrix | Kelly | OVA | |
| 2000 | Catnapped! The Movie | Toriyasu | As Dorothy Melendrez | CA |
| 2000 | The Castle of Cagliostro | Fujiko Mine | As Dorothy Melendrez | CA |
| 2001 | Ah! My Goddess: The Movie | Chihiro Fujimi | As Dorothy Melendrez | CA |
| 2002 | Armitage III: Dual-Matrix | Reporter | | CA |
| 2003 | Sakura Wars: The Movie | Ri Kohran, others | Bang Zoom! Entertainment/Pioneer dub As Dorothy Melendrez | CA |
| 2005 | Aquarian Age the Movie | Hikari Shoji | As Dorothy Melendrez | CA |
| 2010 | Space Dogs | Strelka | | |
| 2015 | The Laws of the Universe Part 0 | Shizuka | Limited theatrical release | |
| 2021 | Demon Slayer: Kimetsu no Yaiba – The Movie: Mugen Train | Kie Kamado | | |
| 2021 | Violet Evergarden: The Movie | Nerine | | |
| 2024 | Digimon Adventure | Yuuko Kamiya | | |
| 2024 | Digimon Adventure: Our War Game! | Yuuko Kamiya | | |

List of English dubbing performances in feature films
| Year | Title | Role | Notes | Source |
|---|---|---|---|---|
| 2000 | Digimon: The Movie | Yuko Kamiya | | |
| 2016–2018 | Digimon Adventure tri. | Yuko Kamiya, Lilymon, Rosemon | Film series | Tweet |

=== Video games ===
List of English dubbing performances in video games
| Year | Title | Role | Notes | Source |
|---|---|---|---|---|
| 1998 | Brave Fencer Musashi | Mercenary Meitlofe | As Dorothy Melendrez; Grouped under additional voices | CA |
| 2001 | Fear Effect 2: Retro Helix | Rain Qin | as Dorothy Melendrez | |
| 2004 | Star Ocean: Till the End of Time | Maria Traydor | | Press |
| 2005 | Rave Master | Rosa | | |
| 2007 | Digimon World Data Squad | Lalamon, Sunflowmon, Lilamon | | |
| 2008 | Star Ocean: First Departure | Phia Melle | | |
| 2010 | Love Dance Seed | Tori Shinozaki | | |
| 2011 | Naruto Shippuden: Ultimate Ninja Impact | Konan | | |
| 2012 | Naruto Shippuden: Ultimate Ninja Storm Generations | Konan | | |
| 2013 | Naruto Shippuden: Ultimate Ninja Storm 3 | Mabui, Konan | | |
| 2014 | Danganronpa: Trigger Happy Havoc | Chihiro Fujisaki, Sayaka Maizono, Alter-Ego, Makoto's mom | | |
| 2014 | Naruto Shippuden: Ultimate Ninja Storm Revolution | Mabui, Konan | | |
| 2016 | Naruto Shippuden: Ultimate Ninja Storm 4 | Konan | | |
| 2017 | Danganronpa V3: Killing Harmony | Tsumugi Shirogane | | Website |
| 2017 | Fire Emblem Heroes | Mercedes von Martritz, Rinea | | Credited on the character stat screen and promotional video |
| 2017 | Fire Emblem Echoes: Shadows of Valentia | Rinea | | Tweet |
| 2018 | Shining Resonance Refrain | Sonia Blanche | | |
| 2019 | Fire Emblem: Three Houses | Mercedes von Martritz | | |
| 2020 | Death end re;Quest 2 | Julietta | | |
| 2021 | Demon Slayer: Kimetsu no Yaiba – The Hinokami Chronicles | Additional voices | | |
| 2022 | Fire Emblem Warriors: Three Hopes | Mercedes von Martritz | | |
| 2023 | Master Detective Archives: Rain Code | Teacher | | |
| 2025 | Digimon Story: Time Stranger | Minervamon, BeelStarmon, additional voices | | |

=== Live action ===
List of English dubbing performances in live action films and series
| Title | Role | Notes | Source |
|---|---|---|---|
| Zero Woman: Assassin Lovers | Rei | As Dorothy Melendrez | CA |
| Violetta | Francesca | As Johanna Luis | |
