= Mike Fahn =

American jazz musician

- Born: December 16, 1960 (age 65); Queens, New York, U.S.
- Genres: Jazz
- Instrument: Trombone
- Relatives: Melissa Fahn (sister); Tom Fahn (brother); Jonathan Fahn (brother); Dorothy Elias-Fahn (sister-in-law)

Mike Fahn (born December 16, 1960) is an American jazz trombonist.

== Background ==
Fahn was born and raised in Huntington, New York. His father played drums with Lionel Hampton and he started on drums himself. Mike played trumpet, baritone, then at age 12 was playing valve trombone. He later added slide trombone. His sister Melissa is an actress and singer. His brothers, Tom Fahn and Jonathan Fahn, are voice and stage actors. He has toured with Maynard Ferguson, Steve Torme, Ben Vereen and Leslie Uggams, Deodato, and Frank Gambale.

== Discography ==
=== As leader ===
- Steppin' Out (Cexton, 1989)
- Close Your Eyes...and Listen (Sparky 1 Productions, 2002)

=== As sideman ===
With Dick Berk

- One by One (Reservoir, 1995)
- Bouncin' with Burke (Reservoir, 1990)
- Music of Rodgers & Hart (Trend Records, 1988)
- More Birds Less Feathers (Discovery, 1986)

With Bob Cooper

- Tenor Sax Jazz Impressions (Trend Records/Discovery, 1979)
- Play the Music of Michel LeGrand (Musicraft, 1980)

With Jerry Vivino

- Walkin' with the Wazmo (Zoho, 2006)

With Frank Strazzeri

- Moon & Sand (Discovery, 1993)

With Andy Simpkins

- Comin' at Ya (MAMA Records,1990)

With Andrew Hill

- A Beautiful Day (Palmetto, 2002)

With Tom Harrell

- Time's Mirror (RCA Victor, 1999)

With Chita Rivera

- And Now I Swing (Yellow Sound, 2009)
