= List of Oh My Goddess! characters =

The following are characters in the Oh My Goddess! manga and anime series:

== Main characters ==
=== Keiichi Morisato ===
Keiichi Morisato

Voiced by: Masami Kikuchi (Japanese); Matt Caplan (English)

Keiichi Morisato (森里 螢一, Morisato Keiichi) is a student of the Nekomi Institute of Technology and a member of the NIT Motor Club. One day Keiichi accidentally dials the Goddess Relief Office. After summoning Belldandy by accident, he ends up wishing for her to be by his side forever. Ever since, the two have been together. Keiichi's pure and innocent personality also puts him in the middle of an unusual love relationship. While he understands his love for Belldandy, he sometimes has a difficult time expressing his feelings.

He is a skilled mechanic and race car driver. He is bestowed the directorship of the Motor Club, which he subsequently passes on to Sora Hasegawa. At his supposed graduation from college, he started working at the repair shop Whirlwind owned by the founder of the NIT Motor Club: Chihiro Fujimi.

Since meeting Belldandy, Keiichi has many experiences, including meeting other Goddesses and supernatural beings. He becomes the only person ever to have flown the Shinden, an experimental World War II Japanese airplane.

Keiichi is portrayed as young, virginal, bewildered, and a fundamentally nice guy.

=== Belldandy ===
Voiced by: Kikuko Inoue (Japanese); Eileen Stevens (English)

Belldandy (ベルダンディー, Berudandī) is a goddess who ends up contractually bound to Keiichi Morisato after he accidentally dials the Goddess Relief Office. Ever since, Belldandy dwells with Keiichi at the Tariki Hongan Temple in the city of Nekomi, Chiba Prefecture near Tokyo. She can cancel the contract at any time, but she states Keiichi is a special person in her heart, and that her purpose is to make him happy. This also evidenced by what she says after the Lord of Terror's Arc is concluded in which she tells Keiichi "I'm here now because I love you."

Belldandy is kind, patient, and warm, not only to Keiichi, but to everyone, without exception. She can easily sense other people's emotions, and tries her best to be empathetic to all those around her. However, even though Belldandy tries her best to be as kind as possible, it is revealed that at times, as a result of latent jealousy, she can become very insecure and sad, especially when she is confronted with an implication that involves Keiichi in one way or another. This can sometimes result in power leaks that affect everything within the vicinity, commonly referred to as "jealousy storms" in the anime.

Belldandy is licensed as a goddess first-class, unlimited, and as such is highly skilled. In the manga is revealed that she also has a Valkyrie License, only because she likes to collect such kind of things. Her power is so great, in fact, that she is required to wear a special earring on her left ear which constantly seals the full brunt of her magical strength. Belldandy's angel is Holy Bell (ホーリーベル, Hōrī Beru); her elemental attribute is wind. Like all angels, Holy Bell augments Belldandy's magical powers when called upon, and like all angels, she also reflects her master's current state.

=== Urd ===
Voiced by: Yumi Touma (Japanese); Lanelle Markgraf (OVA series), Mary Elizabeth McGlynn (Movie), Shannon Conley (TV series), Wendee Lee (The Adventures of Mini-Goddess; Geneon dub), Erin Jesse (The Adventures of Mini-Goddess; The Kitchen dub) (English)

Urd (ウルド, Urudo) is Belldandy's older half sister and is the second Goddess to appear to Keiichi Morisato. Urd ranks as Goddess second class, management category limited license, similar to her youngest sister Skuld. She is the Yggdrasil System Administrator and Manager. Though she is much more powerful than her sisters, she has not become a first class goddess, most recently because she chose not to become a first class goddess. Urd shares a common father with her younger sisters, but has a different mother, the Demon Lord Hild. Because of this, Urd is a hybrid of Goddess and Demon, reflected in the half-white, half-black appearance of her Angel, World of Elegance (ワールドオブエレガンス, Wārudo obu Eregansu).

Urd fancies herself a Goddess of Love, so she comes to Earth to spur Keiichi onward with love potions and well-meaning, but deceitful advice, but as punishment for deserting her post and for using her powers on Earth without authorization, The Almighty banishes her from Heaven until further notice. After being allowed to go back, she decides to stay on Earth instead.

=== Skuld ===
Voiced by: Aya Hisakawa (Japanese); Pamela Weidner-Houle (OVA series), Sherry Lynn (Movie, The Adventures of Mini-Goddess; Geneon dub), Kether Donohue (TV series), Chloe Dolandis (The Adventures of Mini-Goddess; The Kitchen dub) (English)

Skuld (スクルド, Sukurudo) is the younger sister of Belldandy, and is the third Goddess to appear to Keiichi Morisato. Skuld has a Goddess second class, type one, limited license, a category similar to her eldest sister, Urd. Skuld is one of Yggdrasil's system debuggers. She compensates for her lack of magic power with her innate talent for invention, which is known throughout Heaven. Skuld is an engineering genius, capable of building just about anything out of the most mundane parts under most limited resources. She can compute equations and redesign even the most complex engineering blueprints in no time.

She travels to Earth after Belldandy's proximity to Keiichi started creating an increasing number of bugs in Heaven's supercomputer Yggdrasil. At least that was her official excuse, as she believed Belldandy was living with Keiichi against her will. She tried to convince Belldandy to return to Heaven to resolve the bug problem and at the same time with the ulterior motive of alleviating her loneliness. After realizing that Belldandy's relationship with Keiichi was not going to end any time soon, Skuld decides to stay on Earth and act as Belldandy's unofficial chaperon. In the second season she begins to develop her goddess powers. Her angel's name is Noble Scarlet (ノーブルスカーレット, Nōburu Sukāretto).

== Heaven ==
Heaven is one of the two divine factions in the series. It is where the three main goddesses and several other characters reside. It contains, Yggdrasil (ユグドラシル, Yugudorashiru), the heavenly computer system that maintains reality, with the Gods and Goddesses acting as its programmers, system administrators, and debuggers. Yggdrasil works with the Goddess Relief Office by notifying the goddesses such as Belldandy working at the office of people whose fortune and misfortune is out of balance given their actions such as fortitude in facing misfortune, kindness in sympathizing with others. Each person Yggdrasil chooses is granted one wish which can be anything ranging from "wealth that would last a lifetime" to the destruction of the world, or even for simply a "Girl like you".

=== Almighty (Tyr) ===
Voiced by: Shinji Ogawa (OVA), and Hidetoshi Nakamura (TV Series) (Japanese); Marc Thompson (TV Series), and Dave Underwood (OVA) (English)

The Almighty One (神様, Kami-sama), or Tyr (ティール, Tīru) is the Lord (God) of Heaven. As Lord of Heaven, all goddesses ultimately answer to Him and He is responsible for maintaining reality, time, and probability as we know it. His attitude and personality is very commanding, but He is very polite and forgiving; he has forgiven the Norns for disobeying his orders multiple times (as is suggested by Keiichi in the manga). The Almighty One is very blunt and straightforward. He does not understand how humans act and communicate; possibly because He has not been to Earth in a long time. Throughout the manga and anime He is an unseen character as viewers never see His face, which is usually shrouded in shadow, turned away, or simply too close-up; all that can be discerned is that the Almighty One is tall and well-built, with long black hair. In chapter 294, he appears as a Gate character and calls himself Tyr, with the title of CEO of Heaven (大天界長, Daitenkaicho; Ruler of Heaven). In the anime, during the Trouble with Doublets saga (in the Dark Horse Comics translation of the manga), Belldandy answers the phone and tells her sisters "It's the Almighty." After Urd loses odds and evens against Skuld, she answers with "Oh goodness, Daddy?! It's been ages!" However, in the original Japanese version, Kami-sama is not referred to in this way. It is very likely that it is a translation error, as is the case with the OVA dub script, where Kami-sama is referred to as the Norns' father as well. In the subtitles for the OVA he is referred to simply as "Lord" in the places where the dub uses "father".

=== Peorth ===
Voiced by: Rei Sakuma (Japanese); Juliet Cesario (TV Series) and Riva Spier (Movie) (English)

Peorth (ペイオース, Peiōsu) is the fourth goddess of the series, and she enters the story when Keiichi accidentally calls her up one day, much like he did Belldandy. She is part of the Earth Help Center, and a Goddess First-class, Second Category, Unlimited. For a time, Peorth harbored a deep resentment towards Belldandy because Belldandy had reported the removal of a bug in Yggdrasil as a team effort. Believing Belldandy was pitying her, she held a grudge. During her stay she continually tried to seduce Keiichi in order to seem more of use to him than Belldandy, though she ultimately falls in love with him. However, after the misunderstanding is cleared up, Peorth remarks that she does not hate Belldandy anymore, and in recent appearances the two seem to be on friendly terms once again. Still, Peorth's incessant flirting with Keiichi puts some strains upon this new relationship.

Her magic is based on the element of Earth, mainly associated with roses, as with her own angel, Gorgeous Rose (ゴージャスローズ, Gōjasu Rōzu).

=== Lind ===
Voiced by: Miki Ito (Japanese); Evelyn Lanto (English)

Lind (リンド, Rindo) is the fifth Goddess to appear in the series. Lind is a Valkyrie, a member of the battle division of Heaven. Like the Goddesses Belldandy and Peorth, Lind carries a First Class License. However, unlike the other two, Lind's license is classified as "Special Duty, Unlimited", which denotes her position as a Valkyrie. Her elemental domain is ice, even though she is able to control fire and lightning beams perfectly.

In an unlikely turn of events, Lind obtained twin angels, Spear Mint (スペアミント, Supea Minto) and Cool Mint (クールミント, Kūru Minto), though at first she could only call upon one of them at a time, causing her to be teased all throughout Heaven and Hell. Frustrated by her 'weakness' and resulting inability to call forth her second Angel, Lind threw herself into Valkyrie training with incredible ferocity. This intense training gained Lind the reputation as a Goddess of extreme violence. Eventually, she is able to call out both her angels by realizing that she lacked a belief in herself and a trust towards others during her fight with the Angel Eater planted inside of her by Hild in an attempt to replace her angels with devils. She has since become more open and smiles often. She has also established close friendships with Keiichi Morisato and Belldandy.

Lind is notoriously bad at handling magic for constructive purposes, usually resulting in distortion and misshapen objects; it goes as far as altering the very essence of the object, rendering it unable to gain its original shape.

=== Chrono, Ere & Ex ===
Chrono Voiced by: Masako Jō (TV series) and Yui Horie (Movie) (Japanese); Rebecca Soler and Alissa Brodsky (TV series) and Tara Sands (Movie) (English)

Ere Voiced by: Yōko Honna (TV series) and Rumi Kasahara (Movie) (Japanese); Alissa Brodsky and Elizabeth Cartier (TV series) and Barbara Goodson (Movie) (English)

Ex Voiced by: Chiemi Chiba (TV series) and Akiko Yajima (Movie) (Japanese); Emily Jenness and Karen Neill (TV series) and Emily Brown (Movie) (English)

Chrono (クロノ, Kurono), Ere (エレ, Ere) and Ex (エクス, Ekusu) are three goddesses who maintain Yggdrasil in the anime. They generally help Peorth and Lind and such by giving relevant exposition, or lines to increase dramatic tension. They also serve as people for Peorth or Lind to give orders to, allowing the commanding character to verbally direct the conflict, and to explain the dangerous nature of certain actions.

Chrono is the sixth goddess to present in the human world. Like Lind and Peorth (initially), however, she stayed only for a few chapters, chapters 231-239 of the manga. Chrono is terrified of cats due to a childhood trauma up in the heavens with her pet cat, and she avoids Velsper like the plague. She also practices martial arts, aiming for a post in the Valkyrie ranks. At the end of her arc, Lind confesses to Peorth that she is interested in Chrono, so she'll recommend her for promotion to the "Silver Wings" unit. In the manga we can see this new goddess with a different hair color than in the movie: instead of being brown, she seems to be blonde or with a very light hair at least.

Ere and Ex have so far only been glimpsed in the manga, in a cartoon when Chrono gets back in heaven, showing the two goddesses interrupted in their discussion during a scene in which Peorth teases Chrono and later when Hagal's demons make too many contracts with humans unbalancing Heaven's equilibrium.

=== Ansuz ===
Ansuz (アンザス, Anzasu), is the CEO of the Goddess Collective and the mother of Skuld and Belldandy.^{[ch. 286]} She is married to Hild's ex-husband prior to the events in the series.^{[ch. 286]} She acts as the Interracial Romance Inquisitor when Belldandy gives the Kiss of Truth on Keiichi, and facilitates their Judgment Gate trial.^{[ch. 286,287]} She is named after the ancient Norse rune, and the name of a god in Germanic paganism.

=== Eir & Saga ===
Eir and Saga (OVA Itsudemo Futari De)

=== Hild ===
Voiced by: Gara Takashima (Japanese); Mary Elizabeth McGlynn (English)

Hild (ヒルド, Hirudo) is incredibly powerful, with her power dwarfing even the combined strength of the three goddesses. Despite her immense power, she respects the doublet system, and thus limits her power to prevent killing any of the Goddesses. She is Urd's mother, whom she loves deeply, though Urd does not return the feeling (it is revealed that doing so would mean that Urd would acknowledge and thus be taken over by her demonic side). Hild displays a similar witty personality to Urd, though she is far more mean-spirited, and a fondness for dressing in revealing outfits. Hild dislikes Belldandy, because Belldandy's attitude and love for humanity reminds her of Belldandy and Skuld's father and the relationship they once had. Because of this, she has often tried to corrupt or hurt Belldandy several times throughout the series. She also seems to have some feelings for Keiichi Morisato.

She appears a few times before leaving an avatar child version of herself, who would go on to become a regular antagonist for the goddesses, as well as a direct supervisor for Marller. While this avatar possesses only one thousandth of the true Hild's power, it is still enough to make the avatar a powerful enemy for anyone. Despite this, as well as being generally more competent than Marller, she often proved just as inept. In the manga, a small team of demons sealed her main body and attacked her avatar in the human world.

=== Lord of Terror ===
Voiced by: Chafurin (Japanese); Mike Pollock (English)

The Lord of Terror (恐怖の大魔王, Kyōfu no Dai Maō) is a virus that runs on Yggdrasil. It is divided into two parts—the will of the Lord of Terror, and the "Ultimate Destruction Program", Fenrir. It wants to destroy the world and create a world for demons in its place (this happens only in the anime, while in the manga we can see that his intent is to destroy the entire universe in order to create a new, violent one; this is the reason why Keiichi, possessed by the program, wants Skuld to build a 10 dimensional scythe for cutting the 10 dimensional string of the universe, which permit its existence). The heir to the Lord of Terror was Urd, because of her mixed ancestry. Basically, the Great Lord's will influenced Urd and eventually sealed her will away. It then utilized the urn Mao Za Haxon, which contained the Ultimate Destruction Program's bootup. After it had possessed Keiichi, Belldandy told it to transfer to her but it could not possess her, as the base wavelength was different, and was quickly forced to transfer itself to a floppy disk and was then erased by Skuld with a magnet.

=== Urn of Hakushon the Demon King ===
Voiced by: Chafurin (Japanese); Mike Pollock, Marc Thompson (English)

Marller took from a cave and woke up to start the Lord of Terror. The legend states that a bronze-skin demon will become the Lord of Terror. The Urn of Hakushon the Demon King (ハクション大魔王の壺, Hakushon Dai Maō no Tsubo) entices Urd to release her demonic side when she was suspended for walking off her job because Belldandy was sick. Later, the Urn has the direction to release the Ultimate Destruction Program. It was broken by Belldandy with an arrow that was the final step to release the Ultimate Destruction Program.

=== Marller ===
Voiced by: Urara Takano (Japanese); Alissa Brodsky (English)

Marller or Mara in the English anime (マーラー, Mārā) was once the childhood friend of Urd, even though she is a demon. Urd and Mara used to be very good friends, but got separated when Urd chose to be a goddess. Her actual duty is to increase the market share of the demons on earth, though she decides that removing the goddesses will make it one hundred percent. Like her Buddhist namesake, she is generally regarded only as a nuisance; extremely inept, generally failing due to her sheer incompetence, and on some rare occasions because she actually helps the goddesses.

Like Urd, because of her demonic heritage Marller has a music-based weakness: when hearing hard rock, she is compelled to dance until exhausted. Likewise, the close proximity or touch of good luck charms has adverse effects on her; the accidental touch of a hamaya (demon-slaying arrow) once caused complete, if temporary, amnesia.

=== Senbee ===
Voiced by: Norio Wakamoto (Japanese); Kevin T. Collins (English)

Senbee (魔神千兵衛, Majin Senbē) is the miniature genie and the self-proclaimed god of disaster and poverty. He constantly shifts accents while speaking, and lives by the philosophy of happiness being finite in the universe. Because of this belief, he places all sorts of misfortunes on others to raise his own happiness, often doing so by magically causing bad luck or accidents. He usually serves as a minion of Marller.

=== Velsper ===
Velsper (ヴェルスパー, Verusupā), also known as Welsper, is a demon, who is in a doublet, a link of fate established to preserve the balance between Heaven and Hell, with Belldandy. The doublets normally forget each other, but Velsper cursed himself to remain in child form in exchange for remembering his encounter with Belldandy. The curse could only be broken if Belldandy speaks his name. It turned out that his body could not handle his growing power, so he worked to break the curse by stopping time. After installing a virus in Yggdrasil, he ends up having the curse broken, and returns to the demon realm. However, because Velsper hacked into Yggdrasil, he was punished afterwards by being reincarnated into a kitten. He cursed himself again in order to retain his memories from before reincarnation; the consequence of the curse is that he is a female cat. As a cat and penalty-boxed demon she hosts an angel, formerly a tsukaima (demon servant). Hild had implanted it into Belldandy.( during the "Angel Eater" arc as shown in the 20th Anniversary OVA special "Ah! My Goddess: Fighting Wings") Belldandy had turned it to the good but was unable to support two angels. It was temporarily passed onto Keiichi, then to Velsper. Velsper's black fur became white spotted, but returned normal after she named this angel "Die Wespe der Blauen Lanze" (ディー・ヴェスペ・デア・ブラウエン・ランツェ, Dī Vesupe Dea Burauen Rantse) ("The Wasp of the Blue Lance" in German).

=== Hagall ===
Hagall (ハガル, Hagaru), is the second most powerful demon in Hell, who takes the control of Niflheim—The Hell—in a rebellion against Hild, because she thinks Hild has lost the power and glory of the demon world. Through an elaborate plan to get more share of wishes on Earth and to destroy everything related to the Goddesses, she imprisons Hild and sends her servants to attack Chibi-Hild on Earth, however Hild manages to escape and goes with Belldandy to ask for help (the story is currently being developed in the manga—chapters 240 till 275). Hagall usually talks about herself in third person and her powers include mental control and hypnotism. She is a very selfish and ambitious demon who does not consider the energetic balance between Heaven and Hell (brought by human contracts). Later it was revealed her coup was simply a ruse and she's always been loyal to Hild, using the situation to show her an ideal world for demons.

=== Halval ===
Halval (アールウﾞァル, Āruvaru), also known as Halvalth, is a powerful demon who serves Hagall in a rebellion against Hild. Her name has the 'rune of sound' "Þ" (Thurisaz, Thorn or Thurs). Her main power is an ability "to see sounds" and combat in complete darkness. She battled against Keiichi and Belldandy in episodes 251 to 255 of the manga. In episode 255, Halval lost the fight through a plan of Keiichi Morisato: he was influenced by the kiss of Chibi-Hild who transferred some of her knowledge to him before she went back to Niflheim.

=== Thrymr ===
Thrymr (スリュム, Suryumu), also known as Thrym, is a demon who serves Hagall in the rebellion, that specializes in physical strength. She is a strong and muscular woman, with short hair. She challenges Belldandy and co. and blocks their passage through Niffelheim from chapters 257 to 261. Her strength is so immense she's able to deflect sound-waves by punching in the air. After the battle she becomes friendly with the group after healing Keiichi's wounds and later wonders if anybody worthy of her strength will challenge her again.

=== Hrungnir ===
Hrungnir (also translated as Mokkurkalfi (モックルカーヴィ, Mokkurukāvi)) is also a demon who serves Hagall. She wears a mask and a helmet somewhat resembling an old German World War I uniform. She is a "puppeteer" in that she's able to create and control robots and machines similar to Skuld. Unlike Skuld, she views her creations as tools rather than affection as Skuld does. Unsurprisingly, when Keiichi and confront her, due to disabling magic in the room she ends up fighting Skuld.

== Nekomi ==
Nekomi is a Japanese town that acts as the main setting of the series. It houses the Nekomi Institute of Technology, where Keiichi attends, and the Tariki Hongan Temple, where he and the goddesses reside.

=== Toshiyuki Aoshima ===
Voiced by: Nobuo Tobita (Japanese); Scott Bailey (OVA series), Marc Diraison (TV Series) (English)

Toshiyuki Aoshima (青嶋 紀元, Aoshima Toshiyuki) is a playboy around the Nekomi Institute of Technology campus and Sayoko's cousin. He is enamoured by Belldandy and tries often to steal her away from Keiichi, going as far as to set up a rival motor club. However, he always fails miserably. In the TV series, he and his cousin Sayoko can be identified by the supercars that they drive, in Aoshima's case, an Enzo Ferrari (Ferrari 288 GTO in the manga).

=== Banpei ===
Banpei-kun RX (ばんぺいくんRX, Banpei-kun āru ekkusu) (changed to Banpei RX in the English edition of the anime) is a humanoid robot that was designed and built by Skuld. Banpei-kun's primary function is to guard the temple, originally from Marller, however, this has expanded to include any threat the demons send, and even to 'protecting' Belldandy from Keiichi Morisato. Banpei has gradually gained many new abilities as Skuld continues to create new add-ons or new functionality for him. Originally, he required a direct power connection via an external cable but was later given a battery. This allows him to travel anywhere for extended periods of time; however, when the battery runs low Banpei has to shut down and enter memory preservation mode.

Banpei's program continues to evolve on its own: Banpei gained sentience, an appreciation for life and, after meeting Sigel, the ability to love. Even though Sigel is not interested in Banpei, he is not disheartened, and spends a great deal of time and energy trying to get her to appreciate him; he will also not hesitate to risk serious damage to himself if only to help her. His emotional circuit will work at varying degrees, from being completely shut off, to being almost alive; in recent times it has gained stability, ensuring that he remains "alive" at all times. Unable to express emotion, Banpei will at times use a permanent marker to draw what he is feeling on his face: a tear for sadness, a furrowed brow, and clenched teeth for anger.

=== Chihiro Fujimi ===
Chihiro Fujimi (藤見 千尋, Fujimi Chihiro) is the original founder and director of the Nekomi Institute of Technology Motor Club. She is a resolute person and an incredibly skilled mechanic and motorcycle driver, even more so than Keiichi. She starts up her own motorcycle shop called Whirlwind and hires Keiichi and Belldandy to work for her. Normally a no-nonsense personality, she has a soft spot for cute objects, cats and children and seems to enjoy relaxing activities (such as bathing in an onsen) and having fun. She drives a Krauser Domani SSi. When she was director of the N.I.T. motor club, both Tamiya and Otaki confessed they loved her but she turned them both down rather than cause conflict in the club. Both Tamiya and Otaki respect and fear her very much, obediently following her orders. Chihiro is voiced by Yuka Imai in the Japanese version of the series. In the English versions, she is voiced by Dorothy Elias-Fahn in Ah! My Goddess: The Movie and by Veronica Taylor in Ah My Goddess: Flights of Fancy.

=== Gan-chan ===
Voiced by: Mitsuo Iwata (Japanese); Tony Pope (Geneon dub), James Keller (The Kitchen dub) (English)

Gan-chan (岩ちゃん, Gan-chan), also known as Mitsuo Iwata (岩田 みつお, Iwata Mitsuo), is the much-abused temple rat from the Adventures of Mini-Goddess series. Generally nice and friendly, Gan is somewhat emotional and very excitable, but highly prone to gluttony. Due to his nice and trusting nature, he is often led off on some wild adventure by Skuld and Urd, with the result of Gan getting physically abused in some way. Gan has a crush on and prefers the company of Belldandy, since she is much quieter (and far from being violent towards him) than her sisters.

=== Sora Hasegawa ===
Voiced by: Ikue Ōtani (OVA & TV first season), Satomi Kourogi (TV second season) (Japanese); Stephanie Griffin (OVA series), Meredith Zeitlin (TV Series), Melissa Fahn (Movie) (English)

Sora Hasegawa (長谷川 空, Hasegawa Sora) is a member of the Nekomi Tech Motor Club. A rather timid, mousy girl, she looks up to Keiichi and Belldandy. Throughout the series, the two help her to overcome her lack of confidence and believe in herself. When Keiichi leaves to work for Chihiro's company Whirlwind, he bestows the directorship of the Motor Club to her. She accepts the position, despite the fact that previous clubs that were led by her all collapsed (though not necessarily by her fault). Every time she gets drunk, she whines to Keiichi about how people think she is a middle school student, flashing her chest to show she is growing breasts to him. She has a crush on Toshiyuki Aoshima.

=== Hijiri ===
Voiced by: Noriko Shitaya (Japanese); Eileen Stevens and Michelle O'Medlin (English)

Hijiri (聖, Hijiri) is a little girl whom Keiichi befriends before meeting Belldandy for the first time. Appearing only in the TV series, Hijiri has become a running joke in the series, appearing from time to time in minor roles in the stories, such as being shown witnessing the Goddesses' dramatic battles, accidentally kidnapping a spirit that was transformed by Marller, or simply being there at the right time to help Keiichi get a meal.

=== Sentaro Kawanishi ===
Voiced by: Romi Park

Sentaro Kawanishi (川西 仙太郎, Kawanishi Sentarō) is a boy who loves riding his bike around the neighborhood in Nekomi. He meets Skuld during the time where she was learning to ride a bike. He was the one who taught her that it did not matter if she fell off the first few times she tried, what mattered was that she got back up, and eventually she learned. This coincided with Skuld's magical powers slowly developing—it was revealed that a Goddess' power comes from loving others. Skuld started to fall in love with Sentaro, and hence her powers started to develop. Sentaro eventually moves away with his family, though Skuld does not become sad by it, as she claims that despite the distance they will always meet when they want. It turns out that Sentaro only moved to the town just across the river. Urd's comments regarding this embarrassed Sentaro and angered Skuld. It is unclear whether or not Sentaro is aware that Skuld is a goddess, but he has seen Skuld use her powers, has heard her state that she is the goddess of the future, has seen Skuld's angel, and he has stated (albeit through inner-dialogue) that she looks like a goddess.

=== Koshian ===
Voiced by: Mugihito (Japanese); Mike Pollock (English)

Koshian (越庵, Koshian) is the Buddhist priest and caretaker of the Tariki Hongan temple where Keiichi and the Goddesses reside. After witnessing Belldandy's "spiritual enlightenment", Koshian left on a pilgrimage to seek his own enlightenment, leaving his temple and house in the care of Keiichi and Belldandy. He returns in the anime at one point after traveling for eleven months, but soon gets caught up in a fight and leaves again. After returning a second time, he appears briefly, kicking Belldandy (who at that time has an evil mark on her head) and Keiichi out; but when Belldandy gets her goddess licences back, she and Keiichi return to the temple. He is last seen watching Belldandy's lighting burst, calling it the "Great Dragon"; then he disappears for the rest of the series.

=== Sayoko Mishima ===
Voiced by: Junko Asami (OVA series), Mamiko Noto (TV Series) (Japanese); Belinda Bizic-Keller (OVA series), Nell Balaban (TV series) (English)

Sayoko Mishima (三嶋 沙夜子, Mishima Sayoko) is a popular girl at Nekomi Tech, to the point where she considers herself the "queen" of the school. She is also quite rich, coming from a wealthy family: she has her own apartment and an expensive car (Mercedes-Benz SLR McLaren, appeared in TV Series), and gets to throw lavish parties with very important people.

When Belldandy appears, all the guys' attention turns to her rather than Sayoko. Mishima begins to get jealous of Belldandy and wants to make her upset by seducing Keiichi, even though she does not have any interest in him. She even goes to the lengths of teaming up with Toshiyuki Aoshima and Marller to bring her down. Gradually, as the series progresses, she becomes less and less antagonistic, even offering Keiichi relationship advice and foiling Marller's schemes. It seems as though she develops feelings for Keiichi at the beginning of season 2, when she did not feel as lonely when he was with her. Sayoko has seen both Urd and Belldandy use their powers, although she now believes that Belldandy is a witch. She is shown to have much pride, and seems to almost enjoy competing with Belldandy at times.

=== Keima Morisato ===
Keima Morisato (森里 桂馬, Morisato Keima) is Keiichi and Megumi's father. Keima, like his children, is incredibly skilled as a mechanic and as a motorcycle driver (though he is actually a glass blower). He dislikes being called "father" and much prefers to be addressed by his given name. He also has a severe form of heterophobia (fear of members of the opposite sex), except for people that he loves. Belldandy was the only "stranger" who did not trigger this fear upon first contact.

=== Megumi Morisato ===
Voiced by: Yuriko Fuchizaki (Japanese); Emily Blau (English)

Megumi Morisato (森里 恵, Morisato Megumi) is Keiichi Morisato's younger sister. She attends the Nekomi Institute of Technology, like Keiichi, as an engineering student. Megumi is also a very skilled mechanic and motorcycle driver. She goes on to become the "queen" of bike racers around Nekomi. Belldandy has remarked that she sees a similarity between Megumi and Skuld, and that she would like to see Skuld learn some things from Megumi. As we know from the recent developments in the manga, she has a lot of success with boys, but she is not lucky in love because all of her boyfriends feel eclipsed by her motor-queen status and overshadowed by Keiichi.

=== Takano Morisato ===
Takano Morisato (森里 鷹乃, Morisato Takano) is Keiichi and Megumi's mother. Takano is a master player of mahjong and easily beats Skuld, Urd and Peorth at the game. She is also a much more confident and outgoing person than her husband, Keima.

=== Shohei Yoshida ===
Voiced by: Naomi Shindo (Japanese); Michael Sinterniklaas (English)

Shohei Yoshida (吉田 晶平, Yoshida Shōhei) was the temporary boyfriend of Urd in Episode 25 (bonus DVD episode) when she shrank due to problems at Yggdrasil as a result of the Lord of Terror incident. After spending a few days together, their relationship ends when Urd returns to her normal size and confronts Shohei, but not before she gives something special to him to remember her by. In both the original manga and the TV series, Shohei entertains Urd by lending her his handheld game console. In the manga, it's a NEC TurboExpress while in the anime it's a Sony PSP. The scene where Shohei meets the grown up (fully restored) Urd and she tells him that her "little sister" has left is different in the manga and anime. In the manga, the parting is final and Shohei understands that he'll never see "little Urd" once again. In the anime, Urd tells him to grow up quick and kisses him on the forehead, leaving the chance for a future relationship open.

=== Shiho Sakakibara ===
Voiced by: Asami Sanada (Japanese); Erica Schroeder (English)

Shiho Sakakibara (榊原 志保, Sakakibara Shiho) is a freshman in electronics at Nekomi Institute of Technology. She is also a second year correspondence course student in exorcism. Shiho first makes herself known to Keiichi through a secret letter that Keiichi, Urd, and Belldandy take to be a love letter. When Keiichi approaches the rendezvous mentioned in the letter with Belldandy and Urd, he finds that she is indeed very cute. However, she does not seem interested in a relationship with Keiichi, rather only to find out whether or not he is possessed by a demon. She is invited back to Keiichi's residence. At times, she becomes too friendly with Keiichi, making Belldandy jealous.

=== Sigel ===
Sigel (シーグル, Shīguru) was originally an antique welcome mannequin with the form of a ten-year-old girl, with a "welcome" message recorded in an internal tape player. The property of an antique shop, Skuld's utility robot Banpei fell in love with the mannequin on first sight, even going so far as to take her immobile form out on a date. The mannequin's voice player finally broke down and she was sent to the scrapyard, to be claimed by Whirlwind Garage owner Chihiro. Chihiro gave the mannequin, with a new digital voice player, to Skuld. After Skuld re-makes the mannequin into a sentient, walking robot, it demonstrates a reluctance to establish a relationship with Banpei, though she secretly does have a soft spot for him due to his devotion for her. This welcome robot was not named until much later by Belldandy, who named her after the Anglo-Saxon futhorc s-rune, Sigel.

Sigel shows a great deal of admiration and affection for Skuld, whom she addresses as "mistress", and she has also been seen showing respect for Belldandy. Sigel tries her best to keep demons away from the temple, although she lacks the impressive array of weapons that Banpei has. Her only weapons are skating wheels in the heels of her feet and detachable rocket punch hands (when asked about these, Skuld states that they are standard issue for robots).

=== The Three Ninjas ===
Kodama the Bedeviler (幻惑の木霊, Genwaku no Kodama)
The infiltration specialist and Mistress of Illusion. Voiced by: Emi Shinohara (Japanese); Rebecca Soler (English)
Hikari the Flash (閃光の火狩, Senkō no Hikari)
The weapons and assault specialist who wears a distinctive spiked ball helmet. Voiced by: Michie Tomizawa (Japanese); Caroline Lawson (English)
Nozomi the Clairvoyant (千里眼の覗見, Senrigan no Nozomi)
The recon specialist. She uses a recorder to effect her magic and summon their ninja auxiliaries. Voiced by: Yukana Nogami (Japanese); Veronica Taylor (English)

A trio of diminutive female ninja operatives created by Marller (apparently from transformed rats) to serve as her agents of chaos against the goddesses. They are expert fighters with all sorts of weapons. They are named after the three Shinkansen (bullet) trains in Japan.

The three ninjas were sent in one by one to eliminate the goddesses, but they failed in their task, mostly due to Belldandy's friendliness towards them. Eventually, they decided to quit their service with Marller and moved into the temple proper. They rarely appear in the mainstream series from that point on, but they do have several appearances in the Mini-Goddess comic strips and anime television series.

=== Tamiya and Ootaki ===
Tamiya Voiced by: Kiyoyuki Yanada (Japanese); Marc Matney (OVA series), Marc Thompson (TV series) (English)

Ootaki Voiced by: Issei Futamata (Japanese); Sean P. O'Connel (OVA series), Scott Rayow (TV series) (English)

Toraichi Tamiya (田宮 寅一, Tamiya Toraichi) and Hikozaemon Ootaki (大滝 彦左衛門, Ōtaki Hikozaemon) are the ex-directors of the Nekomi Motor Club. Tora (a dark-skinned, hulking man) and Hiko (who dresses in punk-style) are rather crude and brash seniors of Keiichi who make life very hard for him by passing on a lot of work to him. However, they have a great deal of respect for Keiichi's abilities both as a mechanic and a driver. In the manga, they pass the directorship of the Motor Club to Keiichi as they graduate. They were also both in love with the original director of the motor club, Chihiro Fujimi; however, she rejected both of them for the sake of the club. On the topic of love, Hiko later falls in love with Satoko after fixing her scooter, then proceeds to going out with her, and eventually even gaining Satoko's father's approval as his son in law. Tora addresses Hiko as "Dai-chan" (the Kanji "大" in Otaki's name is "O" but can be pronounced as "Dai") and Hiko addresses Tora as "Den-chan."

=== Satoko Yamano ===
Voiced by: Chie Nakamura (Japanese); Stephanie Sheh (English)

Satoko Yamano (矢間野 里子, Yamano Satoko) is a freshman in electronics at Nekomi Institute of Technology. She is quite attractive (even Keiichi Morisato comments that she is one of the top five most attractive girls at school); in the TV anime series, she is also a member of the Nekomi Arts Club and a huge cosplay fan. Satoko meets Otaki when her scooter breaks down on campus and Otaki decides to help her despite the insistence of one of her suitors, that she ride his car instead. They start going out and she eventually gets her father's approval of Otaki. However, afterwards the progress of their relationship is left unrevealed.

== Cast ==
OVA series cast
Character		Japanese	English
Principal cast
Keiichi Morisato		Masami Kikuchi Megumi Ogata (young)	Scott Simpson Jack Green (young)
Belldandy		Kikuko Inoue Yumi Touma (young)	Juliet Cesario
Urd		Yumi Touma	Lanelle Markgraf
Skuld		Aya Hisakawa	Pamela Weidner-Houle
Megumi Morisato		Yuriko Fuchizaki	Amanda Spivey
Toraichi Tamiya		Kiyoyuki Yanada	Marc Matney
Hikozaemon Ootaki		Kazunari Futamata	Sean P. O'Connell
Sayoko Mishima		Junko Asami	Belinda Bizic-Keller
Toshiyuki Aoshima		Nobuo Tobita	Scott Bailey
Episodic cast
1	Guys		Jack Skinner Matthew Johnson
1	Ken Nakajima		Scott Houle
2	Man	Yoshiko Marino	
3	Miyuki Tsujimoto		Joann Luzzatto
3	Newscaster		Pablo "Doc" Fraga
4	Yet More Guys		Patrick Humphrey Scott Bailey
4	Professor Osawa		Michael S. Way
4	Announcer		Stephanie Griffin
4	Sora Hasegawa		Stephanie Griffin
4	Tyr		Dave Underwood
5	Heavenly Operator		Treena Hales
5	Jewelry Store Attendant	Junko Asami	Connie Nelson

Additional voices:

- English: Bob Weidner, Dave Underwood, Jean Jones, John Jeter, Mark Franklin, Nick Manatee, Patrick Humphrey, Scott Bailey, Travis Stanberry

Movie cast
Character	Japanese	English
Keiichi Morisato	Masami Kikuchi	Tony Oliver
Belldandy	Kikuko Inoue	Bridget Hoffman (as Ruby Marlowe) Chloe Thornton (young)
Urd	Yumi Touma	Mary Elizabeth McGlynn (as Melissa Williamson)
Skuld	Aya Hisakawa	Sherry Lynn
Celestine	Hiroshi Yanaka	Steve Blum (as David Lucas)
Morgan le Fay	Ayako Kawasumi	Lia Sargent
Peorth	Rei Sakuma	Riva Spier (as Anne Sherman)
Toraichi Tamiya	Kiyoyuki Yanada	Bob Papenbrook (as John Smallberries)
Hikozaemon Ootaki	Issei Futamata	Daran Norris
Sora Hasegawa	Ikue Ootani	Melissa Fahn (as Melissa Charles)
Ex	Akiko Yajima	Emily Brown
Ere	Rumi Kasahara	Barbara Goodson
Chrono	Yui Horie	Tara Jayne-Sands
Megumi Morisato	Yuriko Fuchizaki	Stephanie Greene
Chihiro Fujimi	Yuka Imai	Dorothy Elias-Fahn (as Dorothy Melendrez)

Additional voices:

- English: Anthony Pulcini (as Tony Sarducci), Debbie Rothstein, Ilona Gyarmati, Johnny Yong Bosch, Jonathan Fahn (as Jonathan Charles), Julie Ann Taylor (as Julie Pickering), Kirk Baily (as Bo William) Lynn Fischer, Richard Epcar, Steve Kramer, Steve McGowan (as Richard Plantegenet), Steve Staley (as Steve Cannon), William Bassett (as Fred Bloggs)

The Adventures of Mini-Goddess cast
Character	Japanese	English	
Character	Japanese	Geneon/ Animaze (2002)	The Kitchen (2006)
Belldandy	Kikuko Inoue	Bridget Hoffman	Lissa Grossman
Urd	Yumi Touma	Wendee Lee	Erin Jesse
Skuld	Aya Hisakawa	Sherry Lynn	Chloe Dolandis
Gan-chan	Mitsuo Iwata	Tony Pope	James Keller
