= Phantom Quest Corp. =

1994 Japanese comedy-horror anime

- Cover art of Phantom Quest Corp. from the Perfect Collection DVD release distributed by Geneon (Pioneer) Entertainment LLC

幽幻怪社 (Yūgen Kaisha)
- Genre: Comedy horror, adventure
- Original video animation
- Directed by: Koichi Chigira; Morio Asaka; Jun'ichi Sakata
- Written by: Mami Watanabe
- Music by: Jun'ichi Kanezaki
- Studio: Madhouse; Pioneer LDC
- Licensed by: NA: Geneon
- Released: August 25, 1994 – February 25, 1995
- Episodes: 4
- Light novel
- Written by: Watanabe Mami
- Illustrated by: Hitoshi Ueda, Asako Nishida
- Published by: Fujimi Shobo
- Magazine: Fantasia Battle Royal
- Published: September 1995
- Volumes: 1
- Manga
- Written by: Jose Calderon
- Illustrated by: Dave Cooper
- English publisher: NA: Pioneer
- Published: March 1997
- icon

Phantom Quest Corp. (幽幻怪社, Yūgen Kaisha) is a comedy horror anime produced by Madhouse and Pioneer LDC. It was originally released as a four-episode original video animation (OVA) in Japan between August 25, 1994, and February 25, 1995. An English-dubbed version was released in North America by Pioneer (now Geneon Universal Entertainment) shortly thereafter. The plot of Phantom Quest Corp. revolves around Ayaka Kisaragi, the proprietor of a Shinjuku, Tokyo company dedicated to helping those in need of paranormal aid. The title is a play on words: Yūgen Kaisha (often written as You-Gen-Kai-Sya) means "limited liability company" in Japanese; but when written with different characters, the word yūgen can also mean "the occult." The kanji 怪 means mysterious, but can also be read as Kai. Kaisha is typically written "会社". This further adds to the pun.

In addition to the Phantom Quest Corp. OVA series, two soundtrack albums, a Japanese light novel, and a single-issue English comic also exist. Phantom Quest Corp. has been compared to the concurrent manga and anime Ghost Sweeper Mikami. The animation, comedy, and action sequences in Phantom Quest Corp. has been praised by critics. However, these same reviewers felt it lacked plot depth and character development due to its short length.

== Plot ==
Ayaka Kisaragi is a beautiful woman descended from a long line of Japanese exorcists. However, bored with their traditions, she started her own business, Phantom Quest Corp. The headquarters of the company is Ayaka's quaint little family home, nestled between the skyscrapers of Shinjuku, Tokyo. Along with the traditional knowledge she possesses, Ayaka also uses very unconventional weapons while attacking ghosts and demons, including a lipstick case that turns into a laser sword and earrings that explode into spiritual energy.

Although Ayaka is very competent with her skills, her own bad habits (overindulgence in sake, karaoke, and shopping binges) often cut into the company's meager earnings and interfere with paying the various experts whose help she usually depends upon. Also, because of her drinking, she often sleeps in bed late, which her partner and business associate Mamoru Shimesu has to find creative ways of waking her up. Along the way, and with a little help from various spiritual specialists, Ayaka can usually be found battling vampires, poltergeists, and cutthroat competitors bent on driving her out of business.

== Media ==
=== Anime ===
Phantom Quest Corp. was produced by the animation studio Madhouse and Pioneer LDC. A "draft" of the show was completed on June 30, 1994. This "File 0" episode is little more than a promotional item for the anime. Phantom Quest Corp. was originally released as a four-episode original video animation (OVA) in Japan between August 25, 1994, and February 25, 1995. Pioneer (now Geneon Universal Entertainment) released an English-dubbed version of the series in VHS & LaserDisc format in North America in two volumes on April 27, 1995, and June 27, 1995. The entire series was released on DVD in Japan on December 22, 1998, and in North America on November 21, 2000. Morio Asaka, one of the anime's three directors, has stated that if Madhouse had continued with the series with more than four episodes, he would have liked to have seen an expansion on the romantic relationship between Ayaka and Lieutenant Karino.

No.	Title	Original release date	English release date
1	"Kiss of Fire" "Mōichido Honō no Kuchi Dzuke o" (もう一度 炎のくちづけを)	August 25, 1994	April 27, 1995
2	"End of World" "Chinohate Made Kimi to" (地の果てまで君と)	October 25, 1994	April 27, 1995
3	"Love Me Tender" "Dare Yori mo Kimi wo Aisu" (誰よりも誰よりも君を愛す)	December 21, 1994	June 27, 1995
4	"Lover Come Back to Me" "Kimi yo Kaere Waga Mune ni" (君よ帰れ わが胸に)	February 25, 1995	June 27, 1995

=== CDs ===
The opening theme, "That's Yūgen Kaisha" (THAT'S 幽幻怪社), and the closing theme, "Mahiru no Tokai" (真昼の都会; lit. City at Noon), are sung by Rica Matsumoto, the Japanese voice actress for the protagonist Ayaka. English versions of the themes, titled "Blue Devil Blues" and "Dancin' with a Demon" respectively, are sung by an uncredited vocalist. A 12-song CD soundtrack for the OVA series was released in Japan by Pioneer LDC on August 25, 1994; it contains the themes, some background music, and a few drama tracks. A separate 11-track album, "Best of Phantom Quest Corp.", was released on March 25, 1997, in North America; it contains both English and Japanese vocal songs and some instrumental tracks.

=== Light novel and manga ===
A Phantom Quest Corp. light novel written by screenwriter Watanabe Mami and illustrated by artists Hitoshi Ueda and Asako Nishida was published in the Fujimi Shobo magazine Fantasia Battle Royal in September 1995. A single-issue English comic of Phantom Quest Corp. was released by Pioneer in North America in March 1997. It was written by Jose Calderon and illustrated by Dave Cooper. The plot involves Ayaka and her associates travelling to New York City for the "International Paranormal Investigator Convention", where they take on new case involving a jaded salaryman who has stumbled upon an ancient codex and becomes a powerful sorcerer.

== Voices ==
Character	Japanese voice actor	English voice actor
Ayaka Kisaragi	Rica Matsumoto	Wendee Lee (as "Wendee Day")
Mamoru Shimesu	Kazue Ikura (as "Kazu Ikura")	Brianne Siddall (as "Jetta E. Bumpy")
Suimei	Naoko Watanabe	Gloria Gines
Lieutenant Kozo Karino	Kōichi Yamadera	James Clay
Natsuke Ogawa	Aya Hisakawa	Debra Jean Rogers (as "Debbie Derosa")
Nanami Rokugo	Kotono Mitsuishi	Melissa Charles

== Reception ==
Phantom Quest Corp. has been almost universally compared to Ghost Sweeper Mikami, a franchise with a nearly identical premise that was released slightly earlier. Anime journalist John Oppliger is convinced that Madhouse based Phantom Quest Corp. on the latter series, noting stark similarities between the protagonists of the two works. Christopher Macdonald of the Anime News Network felt the art of Phantom Quest Corp. was subpar for a Madhouse release, but was impressed by the animation, stating, "Fight scenes and other scenes involving high-speed movement are absolutely astounding in animation quality". Macdonald also enjoyed the comedy found in the series, but disliked the lack of character development and how each episode's plot stands on its own without an actual story arc. Mania.com's Chris Beveridge and Raphael See of T.H.E.M. Anime Reviews agreeably noted that there are several enjoyable moments throughout the OVA despite this seemingly generic quality. They made similar positive comments regarding its visual attributes, with Beveridge calling the final battle in the fourth episode "just great both in choreography and animation". She likened the series to a mix between Ghostbusters, The X-Files, and Sledge Hammer!.
