= Kikuko Inoue =

Japanese voice actress and narrator (born 1964)

- 井上 喜久子
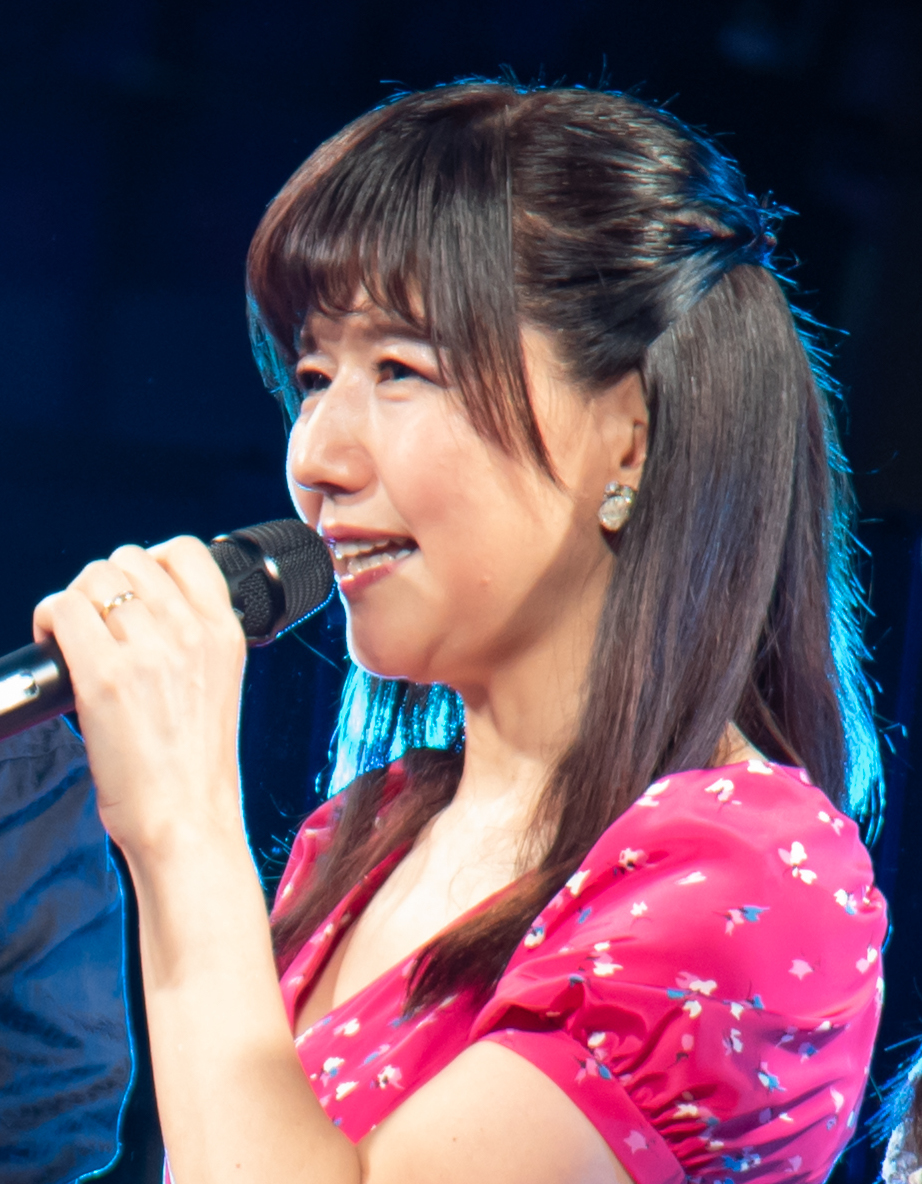
- Inoue in 2018
- Born: Kikuko Inoue (井之上 喜久子); September 25, 1964 (age 62); Yokosuka, Kanagawa, Japan
- Other name: Kikuko Kumagai (熊谷 喜久子) (married name)
- Occupations: Voice actress; singer; narrator
- Years active: 1988–present
- Agent: Office Anemone
- Notable credits: Ranma ½ as Kasumi Tendo; Ah! My Goddess as Belldandy; Guilty Gear as I-No; Clannad as Sanae Furukawa; Danganronpa V3: Killing Harmony as Kirumi Tojo; Fullmetal Alchemist: Brotherhood as Lust; Happy Sugar Life as Sato's Aunt; Please Teacher! as Mizuho Kazami
- Height: 164 cm (5 ft 5 in)
- Children: Honoka Inoue
- Awards: Best Supporting Actress, 4th Seiyu Awards; Kazue Takahashi Award, 10th Seiyu Awards
- Website: www.manbow.com

Kikuko Inoue (井上 喜久子, Inoue Kikuko; born September 25, 1964, formerly rendered as 井之上 喜久子) is a Japanese voice actress, singer and narrator. She has been part of the singing groups DoCo, and Goddess Family Club. She is also the founder and manager of her voice-acting company, Office Anemone. Inoue tends to play the "perfect girlfriend" or "motherly" role in many series, but has also played more sultry and provocative roles.

== Biography ==
Inoue's vocal roles are usually female characters characterized as dignified, reserved, beautiful, kind, regal, mature or domestic. For example, Belldandy, a goddess who is kind, compassionate and skilled at domestic tasks. Kasumi Tendo is an older sister who has taken over domestic duties after the death of her mother, and who acts as a counterbalance to the more rambunctious members of her family. Notably, both Kasumi and Belldandy are almost parallels of each other due to their roles as domestics in a home which could explode into chaos at any moment. She also plays Rune Venus in El-Hazard, a princess and leader of her country; as well as Kazami Mizuho in Please Teacher!, a sensible, strong-hearted alien agent in charge of observing humanity that ends up falling in love with an earthling. In the video game Danganronpa V3: Killing Harmony, she voices as Kirumi Tojo aka "The Ultimate Maid" A loyal and serious Ultimate who takes care of both chores and the students during the Killing School Semester, who goes by the saying "duty before self"; This role also exposes Kikuko's love of maids. When she thinks of maid characters, she always tends to imagine them as a lighthearted one, but Kirumi is definitely the type of an amazing perfectionist whose only cred is "selfless devotion". Inoue also said that she can be a little bit nervous playing as Kirumi in the official Artbook Character Profile. And on May 12, 2020, Kikuko cosplayed as Kirumi for Maid Day.

She occasionally takes on roles which are more sultry, such as Corvette in Idol Project, a curvaceous dancer who flirts quite intensely with Mimu, the young heroine. In the hentai OVA Ogenki Clinic she provides the voice of a sex-crazed nurse. Also, as Lust in Fullmetal Alchemist: Brotherhood, she was an antagonist the main characters have to contend with more than once. On very rare occasions she takes male roles, such as Tsubasa Oozora from Captain Tsubasa ROAD to 2002, as she has stated that these roles allow her to shout, which she finds "liberating".

She is referred to as "Onee-chan" ("big sister" in Japanese) and stayed with the title on her official site and a few albums because of her role as Kasumi Tendo in Ranma ½; this is confirmed in her online profile. She believes that in her past life she was a fish and therefore uses fish as her trademark. She made a guest appearance at the 2007 Animazement anime convention in Durham, North Carolina for an autograph and Q&A session. When asked her age, she often responds that she is only 17, which has become a running gag at events as well as anime shows. At an Otakon 2009 panel, she explained that the number 17 was an aesthetic choice. After voice acting Belldandy from the Ah! My Goddess anime, subsequent chapters of the manga used Inoue's distinctive style as the basis for Belldandy's character.

She won Best Supporting Voice Actress in the 4th Seiyu Awards. In 2016, at the 10th Seiyu Awards, she won the Kazue Takahashi Award for "the female performer who broadens the profession of voice acting in every form of media".

Inoue is married, and has a daughter named Honoka. Honoka uses Inoue as her stage "family" name and she is also a voice actress and singer. Inoue was good friends with fellow voice actress Atsuko Tanaka, who died on August 20, 2024.

== Filmography ==
=== Animation ===
List of voice performances in animation
Year	Title	Role	Notes	Source
1988	Hai Akko Desu	Schoolgirl	Debut role	
1989	Miracle Giants Dome-kun	Mayumi Shinjo	First major regular role	
1989	Blue Blink	Customer		
1989–1992	Ranma ½ series	Kasumi Tendo		
1989	Assemble Insert	Yoshiko Mikawa	OVA	
1990	Chibi Maruko-chan	Yocchan's Wife ヨッちゃんの妻		
1990	Nadia: The Secret of Blue Water	Electra		
1990	The Hakkenden	Hikute		
1991	Oniisama e...	Third-year student		
1991	Kekko Kamen	Chigusa Yuka	OVA adult	
1991	Otaku no Video	Yoshiko Ueno	OVA series	
1991	Sangokushi	Xianglan (adult)		
1991	Ogenki Clinic Adventures	Ruko Tatase	OVA adult	
1992	Oi! Ryoma	Kayo Sasaki 佐々木加代		
1992	Cooking Papa	Mitsuko ミツ子		
1992	Crayon Shin-chan	Aunt		
1992	Hime-chan's Ribbon	Hatsune Yamashita		
1992	My Patrasche	Renner teacher レナー先生		
1992	Fatal Fury: Legend of the Hungry Wolf	Lily McGuire		
1993	Oh My Goddess	Belldandy	OVA	
1993	Moldiver	Brooke		
1993	Dragon Half	Mana	OVA	
1993	Fatal Fury 2: The New Battle	Elsa エルザ		
1993	Mermaid Saga	Yukie	OVA	
1993	Shima Shima Tora no Shimajirō	Sakura Shimano (Shimajirō's Mom)		
1993	Black Jack	Sayuri Manabisu 小百合・マナビス	OVA Chart 1	
1994	Marmalade Boy	Anju Kitahara		
1994	Montana Jones	Piko		
1994	Tenshi Nanka Ja Nai	Hiroko Maki	OVA	
1994	Mahōjin Guru Guru	Rena		
1994	Magic Knight Rayearth	Tatra		
1994	Otaku no Seiza: An Adventure in the Otaku Galaxy	Maya	OVA ep. 2	
1994–1995	Maps	Rain	OVA ep. 3, 4	
1994	Key the Metal Idol	Toyoko Mima		
1995	Sailor Moon SuperS	Rubina ルビーナ		
1995	Soar High! Isami	Reiko Hanaoka, Mayuko Kiyokawa		
1995	Princess Minerva	Blue Morris Rui Elmitage		
1995	Megami Paradise	Stashia		
1995	Miyuki-chan in Wonderland	Queen	OVA	
1995	Battle Skipper	Reika Ayanokōji		
1995	Anpanman	Luna		
1995–1998	El-Hazard series	Rune Venus		
1995	Saint Tail	Seira Mimori		
1995	Golden Boy	Ayuko Haramizu	Ep. 4	
1995	Idol Project	Corvette Hyers		
1996	Case Closed	Chianti, others		
1996	Mobile Suit Gundam: The 08th MS Team	Aina Sahalin	OVA	
1996	Brave Command Dagwon	Anna アンナ		
1996	Sailor Moon Sailor Stars	Sailor Aluminium Siren/Reiko Aya		
1996	Dōkyūsei 2	Misako Narusawa	OVA adult	
1996	Kochira Katsushika-ku Kameari Kōen-mae Hashutsujo	Jinguji chicks 神宮寺ひなの		
1996	Battle Arena Toshinden	Uranus		
1996–1998	Saber Marionette J series	Panther	Also J to X	
1996	Gall Force:The Revolution	Elza		
1996	Galaxy Fräulein Yuna Returns	Genmu	OVA	
1996	Fake	Arisa		
1997	Clamp School	Yukiko Kudo		
1997	Voogie's Angel	Shiori		
1998	The Adventures of Mini-Goddess	Belldandy		
1998	Weiß Kreuz	Birman		
1999	Tenchi Forever! The movie	Haruna		
1999	To Heart	Girl's mother		
1999	D4 Princess	Doria Rurido		
1999	Omishi Magical Theater: Risky Safety	Raiel		
1999	Steel Angel Kurumi	Nadeshiko		
1999	Karakurizōshi Ayatsuri Sakon	Ayano Shigurezaki		
2000–2001	Ojamajo Doremi series	Majo Ririka	# and Motto!	
2000	Gate Keepers	Jun Thunders		
2000	Saiyuki	Yangming		
2000	Hand Maid May	Cyberdoll Mami		
2000–2001	Vandread series	Meia's Fama		
2000	Argento Soma	Guinevere Green		
2000	Shin Megami Tensei: Devil Children	Cool, Kyoko-sensei, Doppelganger Kuru		
2000	Inuyasha	Izayoi, Mu-onna		
2001	Angelic Layer	Shuko Suzuhara		
2001	Rune Soldier	Melissa		
2001	Prétear	Natsue Awayuki		
2001	Figure 17	Orudina		
2001	Shaman King	Anisu		
2001	Cosmo Warrior Zero	Lady Emeraldas		
2001	Samurai Girl Real Bout High School	Tomoe Kusanagi		
2001	Final Fantasy: Unlimited	Fabula, Crux		
2001	X	Tōru Shirō Tsukasaokamitoo, Magami Zico 司狼斗織、真神時鼓		
2001	Najica Blitz Tactics	Daniela		
2001	Mahoromatic	Lesa リーシャ		
2001	Captain Tsubasa	Tsubasa Ozora (young)		
2001	Cyborg 009	Khagaria jade 篝矢翡翠		
2002	Please Teacher!	Mizuho Kazami		
2002–2004	Happy Lesson	Yayoi Sanzenin		
2002	Chobits	Chitose Hibiya		
2002	Cosplay Complex	Ranko Takara		
2002–2003	Mahoromatic: Something More Beautiful	Ryūsha	Eps. 12, 14	
2002	Petite Princess Yucie	Queen Ercell		
2002	Mobile Suit Gundam Seed	Caridad Yamato		
2002	Kiddy Grade	Alv		
2003	Mouse	Mei Momozono		
2003	D.N.Angel	Rika Harada		
2003	Gad Guard	Catherine Flaubert		
2003	Submarine Super 99	Ze Straight ゼ・ストレート		
2003	Parasite Dolls	Angel	OVA series & film	
2003	Cinderella Boy	Alice		
2003	Dokkoida?!	Mizuho Kazami		
2003	Rumic Theater	Ruriko Tonegawa		
2003	Please Twins!	Mizuho Kazami		
2003–2010	Ikki Tousen series	Goei		
2003	Yami to Bōshi to Hon no Tabibito	Ritsuko		
2003	Gungrave	Maria Asagi		
2003	F-Zero GP Legend	Jody Summer		
2004	Yumeria	Nanase Senjou		
2004	Lament of the Lamb	Momoko Takagi 高城百子	OVA	
2004	Phantom - The Animation	Claudia McCunnen	OVA	
2004	DearS	Mitsuka Yoshimine		
2004	My-Hime	Yukariko Sanada		
2004	Gankutsuou: The Count of Monte Cristo	Mercedes		
2004	Mobile Suit Gundam Seed Destiny	Caridad Yamato		
2005	Negima! Magister Negi Magi!	Shizuna Minamoto		
2005	Air	Uraha		
2005–2006	Ah! My Goddess series	Belldandy	TV series	
2005–2008	Onegai My Melody series	Queen Elephant		
2005–2006	UFO Ultramaiden Valkyrie series	Inaruba		
2005	Oku-sama wa Mahō Shōjo: Bewitched Agnes	Ureshiko Asaba / Agnes		
2005	Akahori Gedou Hour Rabuge	Caramel Police きゃん理人さん		
2005	Gun Sword	Carmen 99		
2005	Happy Seven	Kokuanten		
2005	Angel Heart	Akemi 昭美		
2005	Black Cat	Sephiria Arks		
2005	My-Otome	Yukariko Steinberg		
2006	Binchōtan	Narrator		
2006	Papillon Rose: New Season	Papillon dahlia パピヨンダリア		
2006	Humanoid Monster Bem	Rose Schrele ローゼ・シュレレ		
2006	Kiba	Sara		
2006–2007	Higurashi When They Cry	Akane Sonozaki		
2006	Kirarin Revolution	Hunting Sumako 狩スマ子		
2006	Powerpuff Girls Z	Mother of Himeko 姫子の母		
2006	Pocket Monsters: Diamond and Pearl	Togekiss		
2006	Lovely Idol	Akina Sakaki 榊明菜		
2006	Tokimeki Memorial Only Love	Megami		
2006	Code Geass series	Cécile Croomy, Arthur, Naomi Inoue, Dorothea Ernst		
2006	Sumomomo Momomo	Inaho Kameda		
2006	Ghost Slayers Ayashi	Oshino 篠		
2006–2007	My-Otome Zwei	Yukariko Steiberg, Professor Gall	OVA	
2007	Moonlight Mile	Flora Beaumarchais フローラ・ボーマルシェ		
2007	GeGeGe no Kitaro	Kamehime 亀姫	5th TV series	
2007	Claymore	Miria		
2007	Kishin Taisen Gigantic Formula	Lily Luna		
2007–2008	Lucky Star	Miki Hiiragi		
2007	Emma - A Victorian Romance: Second Act	Countess Monica Mildrake		
2007	The Skull Man	Kisaragi Nami 如月奈美		
2007	Potemayo	Miku Moriyama		
2007–2012	The Familiar of Zero series	Eleanor		
2007	Fantastic Detective Labyrinth	Sara		
2007	Neuro: Supernatural Detective	Mio Kakei		
2007	Clannad	Sanae Furukawa		
2007	Hatara Kizzu Maihamu Gumi	Masami Yoshikawa		
2007	Ah! My Goddess: Fighting Wings	Belldandy	Also OADs in 2012–13	
2008	Rosario + Vampire series	Shizuka Nekonome		
2008–2009	Sayonara, Zetsubou-Sensei	Manami Ōkusa		
2008	Macross Frontier	Grace O'Connor		
2008	Zettai Karen Children	Pearl 真珠		
2008	Hakken Taiken Daisuki! Shimajirō	Shima no Sakura しまのさくら		
2008	Clannad: After Story	Sanae Furukawa		
2008–2010	A Certain Magical Index series	Shiina Kamijō		
2009	Hajime no Ippo: New Challenger	Takamura Kyoka 鷹村京香		
2009	Sora o Miageru Shōjo no Hitomi ni Utsuru Sekai	Nozomi Hidaka		
2009	Fullmetal Alchemist: Brotherhood	Lust		
2009	Sōten Kōro	Aman		
2009	Umineko: When They Cry	Virgilia		
2009	Tokyo Magnitude 8.0	Masami Onozawa 小野沢雅美		
2009	Shugo Chara Party!	Rikka's mother		
2009	The Sacred Blacksmith	Justina Albright		
2009–2010	Yumeiro Patissiere series	Queen of the Sweets Kingdom		
2009	Nogizaka Haruka no Himitsu: Purezza	Mizuki-sensei		
2009–2019	Fairy Tail	Minerva Orland		
2009	Kūchū Buranko	Hisako Tsuda 津田久子		
2010–2011	Baka and Test	Akira Yoshii		
2010	HeartCatch Pretty Cure!	Keiko Ban		
2010	Major	Oliver's wife オリバーの妻	6th TV series	
2010	Lilpri	Witch		
2010	Shimajiro Hesoka	Shima no Sakura しまのさくら		
2010–2011	Mitsudomoe series	Marina Sugisaki		
2010	Nura: Rise of the Yokai Clan	Hanako		
2010–2011	Asobi ni Iku yo!	Qoone		
2010–2012	Bakuman series	Miyuki Azuki		
2010	Otome Yōkai Zakuro	Rangui		
2010–2015	Tantei Opera Milky Holmes	Gray, woman, Amoore		
2011	Rio: Rainbow Gate	Lisa / Joker リサ/ジョーカー		
2011	I Don't Like You at All, Big Brother!!	Mature wife 熟奥様		
2011	Penguindrum	Chiemi Takakura 高倉千江美		
2011	Hunter × Hunter	Palm Siberia	2011 TV Series	
2011	Princess Resurrection	Sylvia	OVA	
2011	Future Diary	Saika Gasai 我妻西果		
2012	夢想夏郷, 東方 (Touhou Musou Kakyou / A Summer Day's Dream)	Yukari Yakumo		
2012	Brave 10	Sakurawari 桜割		
2012	Waiting in the Summer	Mysterious voice		
2012	Queen's Blade Rebellion	Branwen		
2012	Is This a Zombie? of the Dead	Imaginary Yuu		
2012	Shirokuma Cafe	Grizzly's Mom		
2012–2013	AKB0048 series	Nagisa's mother		
2012	La storia della Arcana Famiglia	Sumire		
2012	Total Eclipse トータル・イクリプス	Mira Bridges ミラ・ブリッジス		
2012	Good Luck Girl!	Yamabuki		
2012–2014	Love, Chunibyo & Other Delusions	Nanase Tsukumo		
2012–2015	Aikatsu! series	Asuka Amahane		
2012	Robotics;Notes	Misaki Senomiya		
2013–2014	Love Live! School Idol Project	Maki's mom		
2013	Kotoura-san	Kumiko Kotoura		
2013	The Severing Crime Edge	Hitomi Karuko		
2013	Devil Survivor 2: The Animation	Ai Nicaea (female)		
2013	Gargantia on the Verdurous Planet	caster キャスター		
2013	Space Battleship Yamato 2199	Starsha Iscandar		
2013	Brothers Conflict	Miwa Asahina		
2013	Symphogear G	Professor Nastassja		
2013	Day Break Illusion	Ariel Valtiel Westcott		
2013	The Eccentric Family	Mother Shimogamo		
2013–2015	Miss Monochrome series	Kikuko		
2013	Gaist Crusher	Hinoko Shirogane		
2013	Magi: The Kingdom of Magic	Myers		
2014	SoniAni: Super Sonico The Animation	Sonico's grandmother		
2014	Maken-Ki! Two	Aki's mother		
2014	Broken Blade	Greta		
2014	Sabagebu!	Kazue Sonokawa		
2014	Garo: The Animation	Aurelia オレリア		
2014	Gonna be the Twin-Tail!!	Emu Shindō		
2014	Girl Friend Beta	Kanata Amatsu		
2015	Yurikuma Arashi	Yurika Hakonaka		
2015	Maria the Virgin Witch	Michael		
2015	My Teen Romantic Comedy SNAFU TOO!	Yukino's mother		
2015	Re-Kan!	Mother of Young Gals spirit コギャル霊の母		
2015	My Love Story!!	Ai Sunakawa		
2015	Symphogear GX	Professor Nastassja		
2015	Working!!	Kikuno		
2015–2016	Durarara!!x2	Mimizu		
2015	Beautiful Bones: Sakurako's Investigation	Sōko Chiyoda		
2015	The Testament of Sister New Devil Burst	Liala		
2015	Valkyrie Drive: Mermaid	Torino Kazami		
2015	Is the Order a Rabbit?	Natsu Megumi's mother		
2016	Myriad Colors Phantom World	Arisu Himeno		
2016	Phantasy Star Online 2: The Animation	Yumiko		
2016	To Love Ru Darkness	Sephie Michaela Deviluke	OVA	
2016	Amanchu!	Kino Kohinata		
2016	Alderamin on the Sky	Yuka Sankrei		
2016	Maho Girls PreCure!	Benigio		
2016	Poco's Udon World	Sōta's mother		
2016	Magical Girl Raising Project	Calamity Mary/Naoko Yamamoto	Eps. 2-9 (Calamity Mary), 8 (Naoko Yamamoto)	
2017	Urara Meirochou	Narration, Benten (ep. 3)		
2017	Tsugumomo	Narration, Kikurihime no Kami		
2017	WorldEnd	Niglart		
2017	In Another World With My Smartphone	Olga Strand		
2017	The Laughing Salesman NEW	Ari Mamano	Ep. 11	
2017	Knight's & Magic	Kelhirt Hietakanas		
2018	Cells at Work!	Macrophage		
2018	Happy Sugar Life	Sato's aunt		
2018	Merc Storia	Queen Floreida	Eps. 3 - 4	
2019	Manaria Friends	Miranda		
2019	Bermuda Triangle: Colorful Pastrale	Feruma		
2019–2022	The Rising of the Shield Hero series	Mirellia Q. Melromarc		
2019	Mix	Mayumi Tachibana		
2019	Inazuma Eleven: Orion no Kokuin	Irina Girikanan		
2019	Mob Psycho 100	Okami	OVA	
2020	Mewkledreamy	The Queen Above the Skies		
2020	Super HxEros	Queen		
2020	By the Grace of the Gods	Lulutia		
2020	The Day I Became a God	CEO		
2021	Sorcerous Stabber Orphen: Battle of Kimluck	Sister Istersiva		
2021	I've Been Killing Slimes for 300 Years and Maxed Out My Level	Goodly Godly Godness		
2021	Edens Zero	Mother		
2021	Cestvs: The Roman Fighter	Aggrippina		
2021	Dragon Goes House-Hunting	Empusa		
2021	How a Realist Hero Rebuilt the Kingdom	Elisha Elfrieden		
2021	The Duke of Death and His Maid	Sharon Lendrott		
2021	The Heike Story	Taira no Tokiko	ONA	
2021	Tawawa on Monday 2	Okaa-san	ONA	
2021	Irina: The Vampire Cosmonaut	Natalia		
2021–2022	Komi Can't Communicate	Shūko Komi		
2021	Platinum End	Meyza		
2022	Onipan!	Kuma		
2022	The Devil Is a Part-Timer!!	Lailah		
2022	Overlord	Nigredo	Season 4	
2022	Shinobi no Ittoki	Yumika Sakuraba		
2022	Do It Yourself!!	Serufu's mother		
2023	Ōoku: The Inner Chambers	Kasuga no Tsubone	ONA	
2023	The Most Heretical Last Boss Queen	Rosa		
2023	Shy	Unilord		
2023	Ron Kamonohashi's Forbidden Deductions	Aimee Emmerich		
2024	Gushing over Magical Girls	Sister Gigant		
2024	My Deer Friend Nokotan	Ukai-sensei, Mitsu Inukai		
2024	Dandadan	Acrobatic Silky		
2024	Magilumiere Magical Girls Inc.	Miyako Asō		
2024	Ranma ½	Kasumi Tendo		
2025	My Happy Marriage	Fuyu Kudo	Season 2	
2025	Ishura	Lucnoca the Winter	Season 2	
2025	Possibly the Greatest Alchemist of All Time	Mūlan		
2025	Apocalypse Bringer Mynoghra	Isla		
2025	Turkey! Time to Strike	Suguri		
2025	Puniru Is a Cute Slime	Ōka Kirara	Season 2	
2025	A Mangaka's Weirdly Wonderful Workplace	Wakako Tatsunami		
2025	Spy × Family	Melinda Desmond	Season 3	
2026	The Daughter of the Demon Lord Is Too Kind!	Dahaaka		
2026	Dandelion	Seiki's mother	ONA	
2026	Draw This, Then Die!	Hebichika-sensei		
2026	The Cat and the Dragon	Mama-nyan		
2026	The Ghost in the Shell	Puppet Master		

=== Film ===
List of voice performances in film
Year	Title	Role	Notes	Source
1989	Kiki's Delivery Service	Beautiful designer girl		
1991	Nadia: The Secret of Blue Water: The Motion Picture	Medina La Lugensius Electra		
1991	Ranma ½: Big Trouble in Nekonron, China	Kasumi Tendo		
1992	Ranma ½: Nihao My Concubine	Kasumi Tendo		
1994	Ranma ½: Super Indiscriminate Decisive Battle! Team Ranma vs. the Legendary Phoenix	Kasumi Tendo		
1996	Violinist of Hameln	Queen		
1996	Black Jack the Movie	Betty McCall		
1997	Slayers Great	Laia		
1999	Tenchi Forever! The Movie	Haruna		
1999	Cardcaptor Sakura: The Movie	Li Yelan 李夜蘭		
2000	Ah! My Goddess: The Movie	Belldandy		
2003	Inuyasha the Movie: Swords of an Honorable Ruler	Izayoi		
2005	Air: The Motion Picture	Uraha		
2007	Pokémon: The Rise of Darkrai	Joy		
2009	Tenjōbito to Akutobito Saigo no Tatakai	Nozomi Hidaka		
2009	Detective Conan: The Raven Chaser	Chianti		
2009	Macross Frontier The Movie: The False Songstress	Grace O'Connor		
2009	Professor Layton and the Eternal Diva	Celia Raidley		
2010	Trigun: Badlands Rumble	Amelia's mother		
2010	Pokémon: Zoroark: Master of Illusions	Togekiss, Mumargi		
2011	Macross Frontier The Movie: The Wings of Goodbye	Grace O'Connor		
2011	Crayon Shin-chan: The Storm Called: Operation Golden Spy	Narao ナーラオ		
2013	Pikachu: Eevee & Friends	Eifie		
2013	Shimajiro and Fufu's Big Adventure	Shimajiro's Mother		
2013	Takanashi Rikka Kai: Gekijō-ban Chūnibyō demo Koi ga Shitai!	Nanase Tsukumo		
2014	Shimajiro and the Whale's Song	Shimajiro's Mother		
2015	Sleep Tight My Baby, Cradled in the Sky	Satomi Shionoha	limited theatrical release	
2015	Shimajiro and the Mother Tree	Shimajiro's Mother		
2015	Love Live! The School Idol Movie	Maki's mom		
2016	Detective Conan: The Darkest Nightmare	Chianti		
2016	Shimajiro in Bookland	Shimajiro's Mother		
2017	Shimajiro and the Rainbow Oasis	Shimajiro's Mother		
2018	Shimajiro the Movie: Adventures on Magic Island	Shimajiro's Mother		
2018	Love, Chunibyo & Other Delusions! Take on Me	Nanase Tsukumo		
2019	Shimajiro the Movie: Shimajiro and Ururu's Hero Island	Shimajiro's Mother		
2019	Qiaohu and the Fantastic Flying Ship	Shimajiro's Mother		
2019	My Tyrano: Together, Forever			
2020	Crayon Shin-chan: Crash! Graffiti Kingdom and Almost Four Heroes			
2020	Love Me, Love Me Not			
2021	Words Bubble Up Like Soda Pop	Tsubaki Fujiyama		
2021	The Irregular at Magic High School: Reminiscence Arc	Miya Shiba		
2023	Detective Conan: Black Iron Submarine	Chianti		
2024	Mobile Suit Gundam: Silver Phantom	Azami Meginne		

=== Video games ===
List of voice performances in video games
Year	Title	Role	Notes	Source
1990–1996	Ranma ½ games	Kasumi Tendo		
1992	Lunar: The Silver Star	Luna Noah, Alex Noah		
1992	Detonator Orgun	Akitaka Miyabi		
1993	Night Trap	Kelly		
1993	Dragon Half	Mana		
1994–1996	Megami Paradise	Stashia	Also II	
1994	TwinBee Taisen Puzzle Dama	Princess Melora	PS1/PS2	
1994	Lunar Eternal Blue	Luna, Althena		
1995	Mystaria: The Realms of Lore	Anju		
1995–1996	Policenauts	Karen Hōjō		
1995–1997	Dokyusei series	Yoshiko Serizawa		
1996	Dragon Force	Astea	SS	
1996	PoPoLoCrois Monogatari	Narrator	PS1/PS2	
1996	El-Hazard	Rune Venus	SS	
1996	Langrisser III	Lushiris, Varna	SS	
1996	Puyo Puyo CD 2	Will-o-wisp, Trio the Banshee	TG-SCD	
1996	Fist	Maria Kristel マリア・クリステル	PS1/PS2	
1996–1997	True Love Story	Saeko Mikami	PS1/PS2; Also Remember My Heart	
1996	Imadoki no Vampire: Bloody Bride	Anna Makimura 牧村杏奈	PS1/PS2	
1997	Tengai Makyō: Daiyon no Mokushiroku	Delacroix ドラクロワ	Also 2006	
1997	Saber Marionette J: Battle Sabres	Panther	PS1/PS2	
1997–1998	Eternal Fantasy	Alisa Astir アリサ・アスティア		
1997	Ayakashi Ninden Kunoichiban	Miyuki Tōno	PS1/PS2	
1997	YU-NO: A girl who chants love at the bound of this world	Ayumi Arima	SS	
1997–1998	Galaxy Fräulein Yuna games	Maboroshiyume 幻夢	SS	
1997–2007	Ah! My Goddess games	Belldandy		
1997–1998	Grandia	Liete		
1997–2011	Tales games	Philia Felice	Starting with Destiny	
1998	Mitsumete Knight	Claire Majoram	PS1/PS2	
1998	Twinbee RPG	Fortune-teller, Princess Melora	PS1/PS2	
1998	Black/Matrix	RupiRupi		
1998	Princess Quest	Panna cotta パンナコッタ	SS	
1999	Eretzvaju	Ihadurca Il Imella, Karin, Lea	PS1	
1999	Legend of Himiko	Io 夷緒	PS1/PS2	
1999	Gate Keepers	Jun Sanders ジュン・サンダース	PS1/PS2	
1999, 2006	Valkyrie Profile games	Riseria, Aari, Asaka	PS1/PS2	
2000	Phantom of Inferno	Claudia McCunnen		
2000	Salaryman Kintaro: The Game	Misuzu Suenaga 末永美鈴	PS1/PS2	
2000	Blood: The Last Vampire	Akariko 灯子	PS1/PS2	
2000–2003	Never 7: The End of Infinity	Izumi Morino	DC	
2001–05	Sakura Wars games	Lobelia Carlini		
2001	Segagaga	Alex Kidd, Kaorin Nijino, Secretary Arisa, BUG Otorii manager	DC	
2001	Armored Core 2: Another Age	Operator	PS1/PS2	
2001	Happy Lesson	Yayoi Sanzein	DC	
2001	Galaxy Express 999	Haguro Mystic 羽黒妖	PS1/PS2	
2001–2007	Everybody's Golf series	Gloria	PS1/PS2	
2001	Metal Gear Solid 2: Sons of Liberty	Rosemary		
2001	Prism Heart	Freya フレイア	DC	
2001	Inuyasha	Mu-onna	PlayStation	
2002	Guilty Gear XX	I-No	Arcade/PS2	
2002	Hourglass of Summer	Tomomi Yanagihara	PS1/PS2	
2002–2004	Gungrave	Maria Asagi	Also O.D. in 2004	
2002	Mobile Suit Gundam: Lost War Chronicles	Aina Sakhalin アイナ・サハリン	PS1/PS2	
2002	Air	Uraha 裏葉	PS1/PS2; Also 2007	
2002	Galaxy Angel	Shatoyan		
2002	Braveknight: Lieveland Eiyuuden	Remilia Arfolg レミリア=アーフォルグ	Xbox	
2002	Unlimited Saga	Marie, Laura		
2002	Unlimited Saga	Roller / Marie ローラ/マリー	PS1/PS2	
2003	Tenchu: Wrath of Heaven	Kagura		
2003	Yumeria	Nanase Senjō	PS1/PS2	
2003	Chobits: Chi Only Human	Chitose Hibiya	PS1/PS2	
2003	Phantom of Inferno	Crow Deer Makkyenen クロウディア・マッキェネン	PS1/PS2	
2003	Cyber Troopers Virtual-On Marz	Tangram タングラム	PS1/PS2	
2004	DearS	Mitsuka Yoshimine	PS1/PS2	
2004	Metal Gear Solid 3: Snake Eater	The Boss		
2005	Train Man	Hermes エルメス		
2005	Namco × Capcom	Valkyrie, Black Valkyrie	PS1/PS2	
2005	Rogue Galaxy	Lilika Rhyza	PS1/PS2	
2006	Baten Kaitos II	Valara		
2006	My-Hime games	Sanada Murasakiko 真田紫子	PSP	
2006, 2014	Clannad	Sanae Furukawa	PS1/PS2	
2006	Black Cat	Sephiria Arks	PS1/PS2	
2006	Everybody's Tennis	Gloria	PS1/PS2	
2007–2010	Higurashi When They Cry games	Akane Sonozaki	PS1/PS2	
2008–2015	Quiz Magic Academy series	Eliza	Starting from 5	
2008	Code Geass: Lelouch of the Rebellion Lost Colors	Cécile Croomy		
2008	Metal Gear Solid 4: Guns of the Patriots	Rosemary, Sunny	PS3	
2008	The Familiar of Zero	Eleanor	PS1/PS2	
2009	Shining Force Feather	Gurizeria グリゼリア	DS	
2009	Extravaganza of Rosario + Vampire CAPU2 love with a dream	Cat eyes static 猫目静	PS1/PS2	
2009	Macross Ultimate Frontier	Grace O'Connor	PSP	
2009–2010	Fullmetal Alchemist: Brotherhood games	Lust	PSP	
2010	Everybody's Tennis Portable	Gloria グロリア	PSP	
2010	Ikki Tousen: Xross Impact	Goei	PSP	
2010	Metal Gear Solid: Peace Walker	Chico, The Boss, The Boss AI	PSP	
2010	Another Century's Episode: R	Cécile Croomy, Grace O'Connor	PS3	
2010	Castlevania: Lords of Shadow	Marie マリー		
2010–2011	Umineko When They Cry	Virgilia	PS3	
2011	Macross Triangle Frontier	Grace O'Connor	PSP	
2011	Rune Factory: Tides of Destiny	Lily		
2011	Grand Knights History	Queen Muse		
2012	Dragon Age II	Leandra		
2012	Genso Suikoden: Tsumugareshi Hyakunen no Toki	Astrid アストリッド	PSP	
2012–2014	Robotics;Notes	Misaki Senomiya	Also Elite	
2012	Project X Zone	Valkyrie	3DS	
2013	Metal Gear Rising: Revengeance	Sunny	PS3	
2013–2014	Super Robot Wars series	Tyutti Norback, Cecile Croomy	PS1/PS2	
2013	God Eater 2	Dr. Leah Claudius		
2013–2015	Arcana Famiglia 2	Sumire	PSP	
2014	Guilty Gear Xrd -SIGN-	I-No	Arcade/PC/PS3/PS4; Also -REVELATOR-	
2014	Metal Gear Solid V: Ground Zeroes	Chico		
2014	Crayon Shin-chan Arashi o Yobu Kasukabe Eiga Stars!	Siren	3DS	
2014	Sonic & All-Stars Racing Transformed	Alex Kidd アレックスキッド	PS3, Wii U	
2014	Chaos Rings III	Mariaivu マリアイヴ		
2015–2016	Senran Kagura Estival Versus	Ryoki		
2015	Metal Gear Solid V: The Phantom Pain	The Boss AI		
2015	Project X Zone 2: Brave New World	Valkyrie	3DS	
2015	Omega Labyrinth	Yumi Amano		
2015	Exist Archive	Amatsume アマツメ		
2016	Root Letter	Yukari Ishihara		
2017	Danganronpa V3: Killing Harmony	Kirumi Tōjō		
2017	Fire Emblem Heroes	Rhea	iOS, Android	
2017	Fate/Grand Order	Caster of Nightless City/Scheherazade	iOS, Android	
2018	Sdorica	Lisa Ortiz Aguilar, Lisa SP	iOS, Android	
2018	Crystar	Anamnesis	PC/PS4	
2019	Our World is Ended	Erorie Nyunyu	PC/PS4/Nintendo Switch	
2019	Fire Emblem: Three Houses	Rhea	Nintendo Switch	
2019	Death Stranding	Amelie	PS4	
2020	Nioh 2	Miyoshino		
2020	Genshin Impact	Alice		
2021	Umamusume: Pretty Derby	Sasami Anshinzawa	iOS, Android, PC	
2021	Resident Evil Village	Alcina Dimitrescu		
2021	Guilty Gear -STRIVE-	I-No	PC/PS4/PS5	
2021	The King of Fighters All Star	I-No	iOS, Android	
2021	Final Fantasy XIV: Endwalker	Venat / Hydaelyn	PC/PS4/PS5/macOS	
2022	Arknights	Ling	iOS, Android	
2022	The Legend of Heroes: Trails Through Daybreak II	Latoya Hamilton	PS4/PS5	
2022	Monochrome Mobius: Rights and Wrongs Forgotten	Shantuura	PC/PS4/PS5	
2024	Reynatis	Sayoko Dougami	PS4/PS5/Switch/PC	
2025	The Hundred Line: Last Defense Academy	Moko Mojiro	Nintendo Switch, PC	
2025	Death Stranding 2: On the Beach	Lucy Strand	PS5	
2025	Duet Night Abyss	Lady Nifle	iOS, Android, PC	
2026	Kantai Collection	Hie Maru, Algérie	Web Browser, Android	

=== Drama CDs ===
List of voice performances in audio recordings
Title	Role	Notes	Source
Chitose Get You!!	Chitose's mom		
Toranoana	Aoisakidaidaiko 蒼崎橙子		
Dragon Quest V	Flora		
Higurashi When They Cry	Akane Sonozaki		
Lucky Star	Miki Hiiragi		
Nanaka 6/17	Isuzu Asaka 朝霞五十鈴		
Nyaruko: Crawling with Love	Yoriko Yasaka		
The Rose of Versailles	Marie Antoinette		
School Days	Physica フィジカ		
Scrapped Princess	Raquel Casull		
Ultra Kaijoshi	Alien Mefilas		

=== Tokusatsu ===
List of voice performances in tokusatsu
Year	Title	Role	Notes	Source
2011	Kaizoku Sentai Gokaiger	Insarn	Eps. 1 - 15, 17 - 19, 21 - 22, 24 - 30, 32 - 34, 36 - 38, 41 - 44, 46, 49, movies	

=== Dubbing ===
List of voice performances in dubbing
Title	Role	Voice dub for, notes	Source
The Mask	Tina Carlyle	Cameron Diaz	
A Life Less Ordinary	Celine Naville	Cameron Diaz	
Any Given Sunday	Christina Pagniacci	Cameron Diaz	
The Ring	Rachel Keller	Naomi Watts	
Stay	Lila Culpepper	Naomi Watts	
Funny Games	Ann Farber	Naomi Watts	
3 Idiots	Pia Sahastrabuddhe	Kareena Kapoor	
American Graffiti	Debbie Dunham	Candy Clark; 2011 Blu-Ray edition	
Big	Lee Jung-hye (Da-ran's mom)	Yoon Hae-young	
Bride of the Century	Ma Jae-ran	Shin Eun-jung	
Blue Steel	Tracy	Elizabeth Peña	
Breaking and Entering	Liv	Robin Wright	
The Butcher's Wife	Marina	Demi Moore	
The Crow	Shelly Webster	Sofia Shinas	
Deep Blue Sea	Janice Higgins	Jacqueline McKenzie	
Disney's Adventures of the Gummi Bears	Princess Calla	Animation	
Don't Breathe 2	Josephine	Fiona O'Shaughnessy	
Dragon Blade	Xiu Qing		
Evil Dead II	Bobby Joe	Kassie Wesley; 1991 TV Tokyo edition	
Fair Game	Kate McQuean	Cindy Crawford	
The Fast and the Furious	Mia Toretto	Jordana Brewster; 2005 TV Asahi edition	
The Fault in Our Stars	Frannie Lancaster	Laura Dern	
The Frighteners	Dr. Lucy Lynskey	Trini Alvarado	
The Gilded Age	Ada Brook	Cynthia Nixon	
The Godfather Part III	Mary Corleone	Sofia Coppola	
Grease	Sandy Olsson	Olivia Newton-John	
Hawkeye	Eleanor Bishop	Vera Farmiga	
The Help	Celia Foote	Jessica Chastain	
It Could Happen to You	Yvonne Biasi	Bridget Fonda	
Jurassic World Dominion	Dr. Ellie Sattler	Laura Dern	
Knights of the Zodiac	Guraad	Famke Janssen	
The Legend of Bagger Vance	Adele Invergordon	Charlize Theron	
League of Legends	Ashe	Melissa Hutchison; Video game	
Lethal Weapon 2	Rika van den Haas	Patsy Kensit; 1993 TV Asahi edition	
Lorenzo's Oil	Deirdre Murphy	Kathleen Wilhoite	
The Naked Gun	Beth Davenport	Pamela Anderson	
Masters of the Universe	Julia "Julie" Winston	Courteney Cox; 1992 TV Asahi edition	
The Monkey King 3	Advisor	Gigi Leung	
Moominvalley	Moominmamma	Rosamund Pike; Animation	
My Little Pony: Friendship is Magic	Princess Celestia (seasons 1–2)	Nicole Oliver; Animation	
The Parent Trap	Meredith Blake	Elaine Hendrix	
PAW Patrol: The Movie	Delores	Animation	
Raising Helen	Helen Harris	Kate Hudson	
Rambo: Last Blood	Carmen Delgado	Paz Vega	
Red Dwarf	Aniter	Helen George	
The Rescuers Down Under	Cody's mother	Animation	
Robots	Lydia Copperbottom	Dianne Wiest; Animation	
The Rocketeer	Jenny Blake	Jennifer Connelly	
Rolling Thunder	Linda Forchet	Linda Haynes	
RWBY	Mysterious Narrator/Salem	Jen Taylor; Animation	
She-Ra and the Princesses of Power	Shadow Weaver	Lorraine Toussaint; Animation	
Shining Through	Margrete von Eberstein	Joely Richardson	
Sliver	Vida Warren	Polly Walker	
Smash	Leigh Conroy	Bernadette Peters	
Spaceballs	Princess Vespa	Daphne Zuniga	
Spider-Man: Homecoming	Karen	Jennifer Connelly	
Steven Universe	Blue Diamond	Lisa Hannigan; Animation	
Super Pumped	Arianna Huffington	Uma Thurman	
Taxi Driver	Betsy	Cybill Shepherd	
Thumb Wars	Princess Bunhead		
Zoolander 2	Valentina Valencia	Penélope Cruz	

== Live appearances ==
- TV Champion (TV Tokyo, September 15, 2005)

== Stage appearances ==
- Densha Otoko (Erumesu)
- Sakura Taisen Paris Mini-Live 2001 Tokyo (Lobelia Carlini)
- Sakura Taisen Paris no Christmas, Joyeux Noël! 2001 Dinner Show, Tokyo (Lobelia Carlini)

== Discography ==
=== Albums ===
- Bokura no Best da, Onee-chan
- Funwari, Nobi Nobi Perfect Solo Collection (LD + 2-CD set)
- Fushigi na Omajinai: Tadaima 2
- Hidamari
- merry fish: sound & photo book
- Mizuumi
- Shiawase Tambourine
- Sora Iro no Ehon (2-CD set)
- Tadaima
- Tanoshii Koto
- Yūbi na Osakana

Outside Japan

- Anime Toonz Presents Kikuko Inoue (Jellybean, 2001)

=== Singles ===
- Dōzo Yoroshiku ne.
- Okaerinasai

=== Talk ===
- Inoue Kikuko no Gekkan Onee-chan to Issho monthly series (1997)
- Manbow Hōsōkyoku (1995)
- Ruri Iro Aquarium: Manbow Hōsōkyoku 2 (1996)
- Ruri Iro Aquarium Special: Manbow Hōsōkyoku 3 (1996)
- Ruri Iro Aquarium Selection (1996)
- Shin Onee-chan to Issho seasonal series (1999)

=== Collaboration ===
- Lu · puty · La · puty (Shiawase Kurowassan, Kikuko Inoue and Maria Yamamoto)
- Osakana Penguin no Theme (Osakana Penguin, Kikuko Inoue and Junko Iwao)
- Osakana Penguin CD (Osakana Penguin, Kikuko Inoue and Junko Iwao)
- Shiawase-san (Shiawase Kurowassan, Kikuko Inoue and Maria Yamamoto)

=== Soundtracks ===
- Anata no Birthday (as Belldandy)
- Aria Drama CD I (Alicia Florence and Hime M. Granchester from Aria)
- Aria Drama CD II (Alicia Florence and Hime M. Granchester from Aria)
- E-yume, Miyou! (Meimi and Seira from Saint Tail)
- Gimme Love (from Voogie's Angel)
- Girl Friends (from Voogie's Angel)
- Oh My Goddess! Mikami Debut Pack (as Belldandy from Oh My Goddess!)
- Shin Megami Tensei Devil Children Character File 3 (as Cool from Shin Megami Tensei Devil Children)

== Radio ==
Listed in broadcast order.

=== AM radio ===
- Inoue Kikuko no Twilight Syndrome (April–September 1995)
- Inoue Kikuko no Ruri Iro Aquarium (October 1995–March 1996)
- Kakikuke Kikuko no Sashisuse Sonata (October 1998–March 1999)
- Hexamoon Guardians Kikuko Maria no Otsuki-sama ni Onegai (April 1999–March 2000)
- It's on! (October 2001–March 2003)
- Onegai Teacher: Mizuho-sensei no Hachimitsu Jugyō (January–October 2002)
- Inoue Kikuko no Caramel Heights (October 2002–March 2005)
- Onegai Teacher: Hachimitsu Jugyō♥Ho · Shu · U (October 2002–March 2003)
- Onegai Teacher: Hachimitsu Jugyō Shingakki (April–June 2003)
- Onegai Twins: Mizuho-sensei to Hachimitsu Twins (July 2003–March 2004)
- Hāi Inoue Shōten Desu yo! (April 2005–current)

=== Satellite digital radio ===
- Inoue Kikuko no Osakana Radio (November 2000–March 2002)
- Inoue Kikuko no Shiitake Radio (April 2002–March 2003)
- Inoue Kikuko no Caramel Town (March 2003–current)

=== Internet radio ===
- Onegai Hour: Mizuho-sensei no Kojin Jugyō (May 2004–March 2005)
- Onee-chan ha Mahō Shōjo? (June 2005–current)

== Other products ==
- Coco Macne (white) and Coco Macne (black) from the ''Macne'' series.
- Haruno Sora, a Vocaloid for VOCALOID 5 and Synthesizer V.

== Awards ==
Year	Award	Category	Result
2016	10th Seiyu Awards	Kazue Takahashi Memorial Award	Won
