= Grand Kingdom =

2015 video game

- Developer: Monochrome Corporation
- Publishers: JP: Spike Chunsoft; WW: NIS America
- Director: Tomohiko Deguchi
- Producer: Kazuhiro Watanabe
- Artist: Chizu Hashii
- Writers: Kentaro Mizumoto; Tomohiko Deguchi
- Composers: Mitsuhiro Kaneda; Azusa Chiba; Kazuki Higashihara; Yoshimi Kudo; Masaharu Iwata
- Platforms: PlayStation 4 PlayStation Vita
- Release: JP: November 19, 2015; EU: June 17, 2016; NA: June 28, 2016
- Genre: Tactical role-playing
- Modes: Single-player, multiplayer

Grand Kingdom (Note: Guran Kingudamu (Japanese: グラン キングダム)) is a tactical role-playing video game developed by Monochrome Corporation for the PlayStation 4 and PlayStation Vita. It was published by Spike Chunsoft in Japan in 2015, and NIS America in the West in 2016. Following a mercenary group in the employ of different nations formed in the wake of a collapsed empire, the player engages in turn-based combat while navigating paths on maps similar to a board game. Online competitive asynchronous multiplayer where chosen teams of characters fight for a chosen nation was originally featured, but this ended as servers were shut down by 2019 in the West and 2022 in Japan.

Grand Kingdom began development in 2011 under director Tomohiko Deguchi, a former Vanillaware staff member, using similar design and aesthetic concepts to Grand Knights History (2011). The asynchronous multiplayer was developed to prove its viability in Japan, allowing a casual time investment from players. Manga artist Chizu Hashii designed the characters, who was asked to avoid moe design traits. The music was composed by a team from Basiscape, including Mitsuhiro Kaneda and Masaharu Iwata; it was one of Iwata's last original projects for Basiscape before leaving in 2017.

The game was announced in June 2015, when development was around 65% complete. Single-player downloadable content was released in Japan featuring scenarios around the nations and new player units between 2015 and 2016, all of which were bundled into the Western release. Reception was generally positive, with praise going to its gameplay and art design, though its audio saw some mixed response, and critics were generally indifferent to its narrative.

== Gameplay ==
Grand Kingdom is a tactical role-playing video game (RPG) in which players take on the role of a mercenary commander, who forms squads of fighters to complete missions for the four warring nations of Resonail. The game opens with the player naming the player character and mercenary group. The game is divided between single-player missions and the multiplayer-focused War mode. The single-player missions are split between "Campaign" missions which advance the main story, "Single" quests given by Resonail's nations, "Versus" which pits the player against AI-controlled parties created by other players, and "Travel" where players can freely explore areas. Between missions, the player can equip and customize their party using equipment and special gems at the Guild or shops in each nation's capital.

During mission gameplay, the player party is represented as a chess piece on a board game-like map, with pathways displayed in a grid pattern. With the exception of "Travel", every mission has a turn limit, with movement or passing taking up a turn. Enemies are also displayed as chess pieces, moving when the player moves or passes, with some moving on particular routes. Maps include treasure chests, short cuts and hidden paths to different areas of the map. Special events which can be triggered including siege weapons to help the player and traps which must be dealt with in ways that may take varying numbers of turns. Additionally random events can be triggered, leading to extra battles or allowing players to acquire new treasure.

=== Combat system ===
A battle sequence from Grand Kingdom; a melee-class character performs an attack on an enemy unit.

Combat uses a turn-based battle system. Units, together with additional objects such as barricades and traps, are positioned on one of three different horizontal lanes, which impact their ability to move and act. The turn order is displayed on a timeline at the bottom of the battle screen. During their turn, a unit's movement and attack duration are tied to separate action meters. Units attack using standard attacks and unique skills, and can defend if some action gauge remains at the end of a turn. Attacks are tied to button prompts, with proper timing and different button combinations raising damage and adding effects including stunning an enemy or shifting their position on the battlefield. Moves can be undone as long as the controlled unit took no damage prior to performing the action.

Rather than the player character taking a direct role, the player commands a team of up to six soldiers, each assigned a character class which dictates their abilities and statistics. There are seventeen classes which can be unlocked and hired for squads, with more powerful units becoming available as quests are completed. Classes are divided into four types; Melee, Ranged, Magic and "Special" classes with unique actions. Character classes have respective strengths and weaknesses; Melee classes are strong against Ranged, Ranged against Magic, and Magic against Melee. Performing well in battle builds up the Assist Gauge, which allows another unit to finish off an enemy unit near death by expending part of the Assist Gauge.

Unit health is not fully restored at the end of battle, with health recovered outside healing spells and items dependant on the number and effectiveness of assist attacks. Party units can be hit by friendly fire if they are in close proximity to an enemy unit. If battle is triggered near an allied siege weapon, the enemy party will be bombarded by it. The player loses five turns if defeated in battle. If the turn limit is reached, the mission is failed and in most scenarios the player reaches a game over. A quest's difficulty influences how many turns there are per mission, with higher difficulties allowing less turns but granting more in-game currency and experience points to raise unit levels. Efficient runs reward experience point boosts.

The War mode pitted players aligned with different nations against each other in battles through asynchronous multiplayer. Conditions surrounding the battle were defined by voting on the "Royal Order", a representation of the nation's overall battle strategy. Equipment could only be bought from the shops and trading posts of a party's chosen nation. A player could be involved until the campaign ends in victory for either side, or take part in the campaign to strengthen their side before leaving early. Each War lasted approximately one day in real-time. The player could also send up to six squads of AI-controlled units on missions. A currency called Royals could be earned through participation in the War mode, allowing special weapons and accessories to be purchased from shops loyal to of Resonail's nations. During online battles, monsters called Guardian Beasts could be summoned into battle using a Royal Order, with its defeat requiring multiple player parties working together. There was online cross-play support for PlayStation 4 (PS4) and PlayStation Vita players. The online functions were shut down in October 2019 in the West, and March 2022 in Japan.

== Synopsis ==
=== Setting and characters ===
Grand Kingdom is set on the continent of Resonail. Originally dominated by the Uldein Empire, the Empire's collapse one hundred years before led to the creation of four nations now in a constant state of war. The nations are Landerth, rich in natural resources and led by Queen Gladius Ringland; Valkyr, a land dominated by a tribal warrior culture led by their strongest warrior Graham Berngarde; Fiel, a forest-bound nation for those displaced by and tired of war protected by Queen Precia Teller; and Magion led by Julius Wiseman, a barren land whose people are the most powerful magicians on the continent. Due to the constant battles between the nations, mercenaries have become a necessity for leading and forming armies, with mercenary bands organised by the independent Guild.

The lead character is a mercenary brought into the Guild. They are assisted by fellow mercenary Flint Poker, and the organizer Lilia Sforza, daughter of the Guild leader Godfrey. The mercenary's main rival is Weiss, leader of Guild's top mercenary squad the White Wolves. The main scenario's antagonists are remnants of Uld, who seek to reclaim Resonail for themselves; they are led by Teterva, who uses the timid Corona for her own ends.

=== Plot ===
After the mercenary and Flint are recruited into the Guild, they are tested by Godfrey and upon passing form a new squad with Lillia as field assistant. The squad quickly proves its worth in combat, entering into a rivalry with Weiss's White Wolves. The mercenary's squad becomes involved in the Guild's fight against remnants of Uld, with one attack by Teterva succeeding in stealing Godfrey's sword Tyrbrand. At an ancient fortress, Teterva and her granddaughter Corona break one of the magical seals of Tyrbrand, intending to release demons onto Resonail. The squad attempt to reclaim Tyrbrand, but Weiss interferes in an attempt to fight and defeat them, and in the fortress's collapse the Uldiens escape and Weiss is left for dead. Corona, who despises Teterva's cause, steals Tyrbrand and saves Weiss, who in turn encourages her to stand up for herself and takes her in, though she later returns to Teterva with Tyrbrand to keep him safe. The Guild continue fighting the Uld and a growing number of demons released, with Godfrey revealing that Teterva is trying to release the Animus, a group of four demonic gods controlled by the Uldein Empire before it collapsed.

Teterva, sacrificing the rest of her people to hold back the Guild, breaks the final seal of Tyrbrand, allowing the Animus to return. The Guild's squads are decimated when they try to fight the Animus, but Godfrey successfully calls on the four nations to unite their armies under the Guild before instructing the mercenary to kill Corona, as her magic renders the Animus invincible. When the mercenary confronts Teterva and Corona, Weiss intervenes and urges Corona to return to them. She does so, revealing that she can also remove the Animus's protection. The mercenary's squad defeats the Animus, and an unhinged and cornered Teterva leaps to her death from a cliff. Weiss takes Corona in as his field assistant. Godfrey then retires from leading the Guild, leading to Weiss and the mercenary duelling for the position; the mercenary wins, becoming leader of the Guild.

Additional campaigns follow the mercenary unit on missions supporting the four nations of Resonail, unlocked after the main story is cleared. In Landerth, which is currently in conflict with Magion, the mercenaries serve Queen Gladius and protect her younger brother who is determined to prove himself a worthy successor. In Valkyr, the mercenaries end up supporting the dying warrior Silva, who spends his final days challenging his leader Graham in a ceremonial duel despite the protests of his adopted daughter Kiara. In Fiel, the group must train the soldiers of the nation, weaning them off their reliance on the predictions of their queen Precia as they are attacked by the forces of Landerth. In Magion, the group support efforts by Julius's sister Medea in bringing acceptance for non-magical "mundanes" in the nation, ending up in conflict with a magic supremacy group.

== Development ==
Tomohiko Deguchi, a former staff member at Vanillaware who was level designer for Muramasa: The Demon Blade (2009) and directed 2011's Grand Knights History, founded independent developer Monochrome Corporation that same year so he could pursue his own projects. After establishing Monochrome, Deguchi shopped game concepts around multiple publishers. Deguchi ending up meeting Kazuhiro Watanabe, a friend of his also from Vanillaware and now producer at Spike Chunsoft. Having previously agreed to work together if Deguchi ever went independent, they decided to collaborate. Grand Kingdom was chosen as the project had been in a planned state since their initial meeting, and Watanabe wanted to work on an RPG. Watanabe had also played and enjoyed Grand Knights History.

Deguchi acted as director, and Watanabe as producer, with Spike Chunsoft publishing. From the outset of development, Deguchi wanted a game that would mix elements from multiple unspecified game genres with an engaging online element. The team started with just three people in a small office, gradually expanding during development to fourteen. While working on the game, Deguchi kept in mind the learned development mindset of Vanillaware's George Kamitani of maintaining a concept throughout the whole of game development. Production originally began for the Vita, then partway through it was decided to develop for the PS4 as well. As the art was already in a high resolution format, changing to dual platform development did not cause problems. The team made use of later release delays to perform adjustments to the multiplayer.

While similar in art style and premise to Grand Knights History, Deguchi called the gameplay very different, focusing on real-time action and tactical positioning. Like Grand Knights History, Grand Kingdom was inspired by Deguchi's love of tabletop and board games, and video game series including Disgaea. He designed the asynchronous War mode for two reasons; to encourage a large number of people to engage in the nation wars without player limits, and to prove that asynchronous multiplayer could work as it was not the norm in Japan. The Versus mode was something Deguchi had long wanted to do, comparing it to playing alongside ghost characters in racing games. A specific element carried over from Grand Knights History was raising fighting units and sending them on missions.

Deguchi created the setting and premise, with Kentaro Mizumoto acting as planner. The choice of four kingdoms over the three of Grand Knights History was to broaden the storyline. When designing the kingdoms of Resonail, Deguchi wanted each to be distinct, having their stories and culture in mind before they were designed. Landerth was a "land of knighthood", Magion was included so the world's magical elements had an obvious outlet, and Fiel was included to show a young nation in the process of evolving. The concept for Valkyr as a strength-ruled warrior nation came from a different member of staff. When using the terms "knight" and "warrior" in reference to Landerth and Valkyr respectively, Deguchi was making reference to their use of chivalric and Viking "mythologies". Each nation was given a color theme based on their selected culture.

While most of the gaming industry was focusing on 3D graphics, Deguchi had a love for 2D going back to his early gaming days and wanted to preserve them. It proved a challenging choice as gamers expected 2D art in games to be high quality, encountering additional difficulty finding staff despite Japan having a strong culture of 2D game design. The characters were designed by Chizu Hashii, known as both a manga artist and character designer for anime series including Blood+ and Loups=Garous. The development team wanted to add the "flavor" of a manga illustrator, with Hashii being asked to create character designs emulating the art design of genre classics, and avoid traits of popular moe art design. General monster designs were created by illustrator Ippitsusai. The Guardian Beast monsters were designed by Shin Nagasawa, known for his work on the Etrian Odyssey series.

=== Music ===
The music was composed by a team from Basiscape, a company founded by Hitoshi Sakimoto who had previously worked with Vanillaware on their projects including Grand Knights History. Mitsuhiro Kaneda was both a composer and arranger, and the music director. Azusa Chiba, Kazuki Higashihara, Yoshimi Kudo and Masaharu Iwata all composed and arranged tracks. The game was one of Iwata's last contributions prior to leaving Basiscape in 2017. While sharing composers and a premise with Grand Knights History, its musical style was kept distinct using different instrumentation. The ending theme "Prayers of War" was performed by Corona's voice actress Eriko Matsui. It was composed by Kaneda, and the lyrics were written by Watanabe. A 3CD soundtrack album was published by Basiscape on June 29, 2016, its booklet containing commentary from Kaneda and the lyrics for "Prayers of War". The album later saw a worldwide release on streaming services in June 2025.

== Release ==
Grand Kingdom was announced in June 2015 through an issue of Japanese gaming magazine Famitsu, with development being reported as 65% complete. Originally scheduled for release in October that year, it was delayed to November 19. Pre-orders came with a CD of selected themes from the game, and a powerful character class and armour set. A demo subtitled "Lite Version" was released on November 12, giving players access to the first two story campaign chapters and the ability to take part in one War scenario per day. Save data from the demo could be carried over into the retail release. A strategy guide was published by Kadokawa Shoten on December 26.

The game was supported in Japan with free downloadable content. The first update, released on November 25 for free, included the opening chapters of single-player scenarios following the four nations of Resonail. The next update on December 23 unlocked the full storyline of Valkyr. The update for January 22, 2016 included the full Fiel campaign, new unit customization options, and new gameplay items. The February 2 update completed the Magion storyline, and came bug fixes, four new character classes, and a temporary experience boost campaign tied to the War mode. The final update on February 15 unlocked the full Landerth campaign, and included further bug fixes and a second experience boost campaign. The game and its DLC was delisted from digital store fronts on February 28, 2022, preparatory to the end of online services for multiplayer.

A physical and digital Western release by NIS America, building on their previous localizations of Spike Chunsoft series Danganronpa, was announced in January 2016. The PS4 version was among the playable games shown off by Sony at their PlayStation booth at the PAX East event in April 2016. A beta test for the online functions ran from May 3 to May 10, allowing participants to regain experience and money earned in the full release. For the English release, the storyline and character class DLC were bundled with the main campaign, and included the English and Japanese dubs. Originally scheduled for June 17 in Europe and June 21 in North America, the North American physical release was delayed to June 28 due to disc manufacturing issues. The demo version was also planned for release on June 7 in North America and June 8 in Europe, but due to technical issues the North American version was delayed until post-release.

In addition to the standard version, three limited editions were created by NIS America. The first "Launch Edition" included a five-track soundtrack CD and 30-age art book. The "Limited Edition" included a 128-page art book, a 15-track CD, a poster featuring promotional art, and a sticker set. The "Grand Edition" additionally included two more posters, a lapel pin set, and a set of mini art prints. The European Limited and Grand editions included the wrong soundtrack CD featuring five instead of fifteen tracks due to a manufacturing error, prompting NIS America to offer purchasers a replacement service. Digital pre-orders of the PS4 version included a PS4 theme and additional in-game items. As a consequence of the technical and manufacturing issues, NIS America extended the free download period for an early and day-one purchaser DLC "Lord' Set" bundle featuring a new themed player piece and equipment.

== Reception ==
Reception

Aggregate score
Aggregator	Score
Metacritic	78/100 (PS4); 76/100 (PSV)

Review scores
Publication	Score
Destructoid	7/10
Famitsu	31/40
Game Informer	8/10
Hardcore Gamer	4/5
Push Square	8/10
RPGamer	3.5/5
RPGFan	81/100 (PS4); 85/100 (PSV)
USgamer	4/5
NZGamer	7.5/10
RPG Site	6/10

Both versions of Grand Kingdom met with a "generally favorable" reception according to review aggregator website Metacritic. The website recorded scores of 78 out of 100 for the PS4 version based on 33 reviews, and 76 out of 100 for the Vita version based on 11 reviews.

Comments on the game's art design were positive overall. Kimberley Wallace, writing for Game Informer, lauded the character and background artwork, but felt the field environments lacking in detail. USGamer's Kat Bailey positively noted the art design and how changes in equipment were reflected in character models. Trace Wysaske of RPGFan, reviewing the PS4 version, said the art design helped keep player attention compared to other elements he felt lacking. RPGamer's Mike Moehnke praised the art design of characters in both cutscenes and gameplay, noting the smooth movement of character models in battle on the Vita. Dene Benham of NZGamer praised the character designs as "beautiful", noting both their variety and the liveliness given by animations. Josh Torres of RPG Site positively compared the artwork to that of Vanillaware's games, though felt some of the sprite animations were too choppy for his tastes.

The plot drew mixed responses. Wallace noted that the plot was not the game's main draw, calling it a basic set-up for the gameplay. CJ Andriessen of Destructoid noted the lack of a strong narrative, but enjoyed the immersion of major characters speaking directly to the player. Benham noted the story's similar style and delivery to Grand Knights History, citing it as unimportant. Reviewing the Vita version for RPGFan, Rob Rogen gave little mention to the story and characters, summing them up as "pretty generic". Moehnke also noted the plot's derivative nature, but enjoyed the White Wolves subplot. Hardcore Gamer's Chris Shive summed up the story as serviceable but forgettable until its later stages. Torres was disappointed in the lack of any narrative hook, and said that and the weak characters made the story campaign a slog to play through. Both Moehnke and Bailey praised the packaging of the story DLC in the Western release, noting both the increased playtime and the additional lore surrounding the nations of Resonail.

Reactions to the audio were mixed to positive. Speaking on the subject, Wallace called the music decent and was thankful that voice acting was sparse. Bailey by contrast liked the voice cast but called the music "forgettable". Wysaske praised the soundtrack as one of the game's strong points. Moehnke enjoyed the number of battle tracks in the game, and praised both the English voice work and the inclusion of the Japanese dub. Torres positively compared the music to that of Grand Knights History, highlighting the home base theme.

The gameplay saw general praise. The four Famitsu reviewers gave praise to the battle system, though one reviewer found the combat system overly complicated and another felt a lack of impact from the online elements. Andriessen praised it as one of the more original tactical games of the time, though noted its gameplay repetition might tire players. Wallace called the game "entertaining", and said that fans of strategy games will be satisfied with this title. Shive, after being disappointed in the first hour, gave high general praise to the battle design and depth of customization. Benham enjoyed the mixture of gameplay elements, recommending the Vita version as the best way to enjoy its battles in a casual way. Wysaske described Grand Kingdom as "constantly at odds with itself" due to its combination of new elements and elements carried over from Grand Knights History, though he found the gameplay enjoyable overall. Moehnke and Matt Adcock of Push Square both similarly praised the gameplay variety and depth of customization. Torres praised the board game presentation and depth of customization and systems. Bailey summed it up as "a messy, often ambitious game" that was difficult to describe, feeling that the game's mechanics would be better expressed in a potential sequel with more enemy and class variety. When mentioned the multiplayer saw general praise for its innovative design, with Rogan saying it helped set the game apart from others on the market. Occasional high difficulty spikes were negatively noted by reviewers.
