= Idol Project =

1995 anime series

- Logo from the series

アイドルプロジェクト (Aidoru Purojekuto)
- Genre: Comedy
- Original video animation
- Directed by: Yasuchika Nagaoka; Yutaka Satō
- Written by: Hiromitsu Amano; Naruhisa Arakawa
- Music by: Kanji Saitō
- Studio: Studio OX
- Licensed by: NA: Media Blasters
- Released: 22 September 1995 – 24 October 1997
- Episodes: 4
- Video game

Idol Project
- Developer: KSS
- Publisher: KSS
- Genre: Role-Playing, Simulation
- Platform: FM Towns, PC-98
- Released: September 22nd, 1994; July, 1995
- Video game

Idol Project 2
- Developer: KSS
- Publisher: KSS
- Genre: Role-playing, Simulation
- Platform: PC-98
- Released: December 22nd, 1995

Idol Project (アイドルプロジェクト, Aidoru Purojekuto) is a short four-episode original video animation (OAV) series produced in 1995 by Studio OX. This anime follows a cute 14-year-old girl named Mimu Emilton, who dreams of becoming a singing idol, much like her own idol, Yuri. Yuri brought world peace through her music and became the world's president. Mimu has a chance to audition in her hometown of Starland in front of Yuri, with the help of 6 "Excellent Idols" (Yuri's successors).

However, before Mimu has the chance to sing in front of Yuri, Yuri and the Excellent Idols are kidnapped by aliens and taken to another universe. The group lands on the Tropical Dimension's Bali Hawaii, where they are warmly welcomed. A competition is about to begin in two hours to raise Bali Hawaii's sun, and idols from all over space arrive to take part. The owner, Mr Bananaan, desires for the Excellent Idols to win, since they are his most recent obsession. The competition includes several activities, such as the Swing Ski, Muddy Quiz Contest, and Water-Scooter Fight. After several comical events, Yuri mistakenly is named the only one able to help the sun rise again for the first time.

After the competition, Mimu must save up enough money to make it back to Starland, her hometown which is universes away.

== Characters ==
Mimu Emilton (未夢・エミルトン, Mimu Emiruton)
Mimu is a 14-year-old girl with large aspirations of becoming the best idol in the universe. Although she is very ambitious, she often loses confidence quickly and becomes easily discouraged, but something always comes up to motivate her, and she works tirelessly for her dream. Her motto is Dream.
Voiced by: Mariko Kouda (Japanese); Michelle Ruff (English)
Layla B. Simmons (レイラ・B・シモンズ, Reira Bī Shimonzu)
Layla is an outgoing, gritty, 16-year-old rockstar who has an intimate relationship with her guitar. Although she appears extremely tough, she has unusual soft spots, especially for her guitar (which she cannot sleep without) and Mimu, whom she believes to have extraordinary talent. Her advice for aspiring idols is Guts!
Voiced by: Aya Hisakawa (Japanese); Sue Beth Arden (English)
Extra Kaidou (エクストラ・海堂, Ekusutora Kaidō)
Extra is a superfluous pianist who believes strongly in class. Because a lady never reveals her age, Extra's age is unknown (though she is probably 16 like her rival, Layla). Her philosophy for stardom is Dignity.
Voiced by: Mika Kanai (Japanese); Ellen Wilkinson (English)
Corvette Hiyards (コルベット・ハイヤーズ, Korubetto Haiyāzu)
Corvette is a 17-year-old stage dancer with a touchy-feely and too-friendly disposition. She loves taking baths and singing. Her motto is Rhythm.
Voiced by: Kikuko Inoue (Japanese); Tina Dixon (English)
Palpu Ranrang (ぱるぷ・蘭々, Parupu Ranran)
Palpu Ranrang (Palpurin for short) is an energetic 13-year-old martial arts expert with her own superhero show. She considers her whirlwind kicks and high-speed punches as signs of endearment - and her fans love being mauled by her. Her idol motto is Relax.
Voiced by: Hinako Kanamaru (Japanese); Julie Pickering (English)
Ruka Essenpolka (ルカ・エッセンポルカ, Ruka Essenporuka)
Ruka is a 9-year-old actress who loves collecting stuffed animals. Her advice for aspiring idols is Smile!
Voiced by: Satomi Koorogi (Japanese); Willow Armstrong (English)
Shion Suzukaze (鈴風紫音, Suzukaze Shion)
Shion is a 15-year-old ninja idol from Japan. Her hobby is reading.
Voiced by: Rie Iwatsubo

== Anime ==
The anime, also referred to as an OAV (Original Animated Version) was released in 1995 by Studio OX (known for Burn Up W, Ultra Maniac, and Wild Cardz). In Japan it was dubbed into various languages including English and Italian. It was directed by Yasufumi Nagaoka and the character designer/animation director was Noritaka Suzuki.

=== Episode list ===
No.	Title	Original release date
1	"Starland Festival"; Transliteration: "Sutārando Fesutibaru" (Japanese: スターランド♥フェスティバル)	22 September 1995
2	"Tropical Dimension"; Transliteration: "Toropikaru Dimenjon" (Japanese: トロピカル♥ディメンジョン)	26 January 1996
3	"Shocking Report"; Transliteration: "Shokkingu Ripōto" (Japanese: ショッキング♥リポート)	28 March 1997
4	"Final Concert"; Transliteration: "Fainaru Konsāto" (Japanese: ファイナル♥コンサート)	24 October 1997

== Music ==
Idol Project's music is upbeat, performed by its cast of voice actors.

=== OP/ED ===
Opening theme
Don't Stop
Ending theme
Kimi no Heart wo Neraiuchi

=== CDs ===
アイドルプロジェクト―ファーストプレゼント (Idol Project: First Present)

1. Don't Stop!―ス･テ･キにめぐり会いたい (Don't Stop! Suteki ni Meguri Aitai) (Opening Theme)
2. Angel Kiss
3. カ･ン･セ･ツ♥キッス (Kansetsu♥Kiss)
4. Crystal Generation
5. オ･ン･ナ･の果実 (Onna no Kajitsu)
6. Cotton Boy
7. ビーナス誕生！(Venus Tanjou!)
8. みんあ恋のせいね (Minna Koi no Seine)
9. FOLLOW THE HEART
10. 実力派に愛のエールを (Jitsuryokuha ni Ai no Yell wo)
11. 君のハートを狙いうち (Kimi no Heart wo Neraiuchi)
12. 星のメロディー (Hoshi no Melody)

アイドルプロジェクト―セカンド♥ステージ (Idol Project: Second Stage)

1. 天使のいる空 (Tenshi no Iru Sora)
2. 時季の国のアリス (Toki no Kuni no Alice)
3. 真珠色ロマンス (Shinju Iro Romance)
4. やる気のシャボン玉 (Yaruki no Shabon Dama)
5. Shinny Boy―真夏のまん中― (Shiny Boy -Manatsu no Mannaka-)
6. PI･A･NO
7. Be Up! ―夢を追いつめて― (Be Up! -Yume wo Oitsumete-)
8. 人魚のため息 (Ningyo no Tameiki)
9. Star Nights, Star Days
10. 愛だ！？正義だ！？ぱるぷりん (Aida!? Seigida!? Palpurin)
11. 恋唄 (Koi Uta)

Idol Project: New Dream
