= Miracle Giants Dome-kun =

Japanese anime television series

ミラクル・ジャイアンツ童夢くん (Mirakuru Jaiantsu Dōmu-kun)
- Genre: Sports, drama
- Manga
- Written by: Shotaro Ishinomori
- Published by: Gakken
- Magazine: Nen no Gakushuu
- Original run: August 1988 – March 1992
- Volumes: 2
- Anime television series
- Directed by: Takashi Watanabe
- Produced by: Hidehiko Takei; Kyotaro Kimura; Yasuo Kaneko
- Written by: Haruya Yamazaki; Michiru Shimada; Tsunehisa Ito
- Music by: Hiroaki Kondo
- Studio: Studio Gallop
- Original network: NTV
- Original run: April 2, 1989 – March 25, 1990
- Episodes: 49

Miracle Giants Dome-kun (ミラクル・ジャイアンツ童夢くん, Mirakuru Jaiantsu Dōmu-kun) is a Japanese anime television series based on a manga by Shotaro Ishinomori. It ran for 49 episodes and was animated by Studio Gallop. Directed by Takashi Watanabe, the anime closely follows the adventures of Dome Shinjo, a 10-year-old boy who is the son of a deceased legendary player of Yomiuri Giants.

== Plot ==
Dome Shinjo inherited the love for baseball and his great abilities for the sport from his father even if his mother and his elder sister try to discourage him from practicing the same. Before dying, Dome's father had time to teach him a magical shot. After his father died and his mother gave him the glove his father used, he made the same shot in a training session of the Giants and was contracted immediately.

With the support of veteran players in the team, this young player made the Giants unbeatable in their home ground and none of the main batters in the Japanese professional league managed to get past his magical shot. This unanimous victory however does not apply to games abroad since Dome is just allowed to play in the Tokyo Dome—after which he was named and where his father was consecrated as well.

When the veteran captain of the Dragons manages to bat his shot, this young boy finally tastes defeat but quickly bounces back after inventing a new magical shot. New rivals and friends like Melody Norman, an American girl who disguises herself as a boy because women aren't allowed to play the sport enter the scene along with the mysterious Don Carlos, a Spanish ex-bullfighter who plays for the Hiroshima Toyo Carp and had an old rivalry with his father.

== Voice cast ==
- Chika Sakamoto as Dome Shinjo.
- Kikuko Inoue as Mayumi Shinjo.
- Hideyuki Umezu as Yumeto Shinjō.
- Rena Kurihara as Akane Shinjo.
- Satomi Kōrogi as Kaori.
- Rei Sakuma as Andy/Melody Patricia Norman.
- Masahiro Anzai as Paula Dodo.
- Shō Hayami as Don Carlos.

== Storage status of the work ==
In 1996, all episodes were rebroadcast on CS Family Theater Family Gekijo, but since then, it has not been rebroadcast on CS or other channels, and has not been released on DVD except for some episodes (up to episode 10 and the special) on VHS. On the now-closed website of the director Takashi Watanabe, there is a statement that "the master tapes in Studio Gallop's warehouse were submerged due to a flood," and this is said to be the reason.

On July, 2025, a person asked to the archives of the Catalan channel TV3 if they had any tapes of this anime, and received the response that they had stored 49 episodes.

Preceded by Dennou Keisatsu Cybercop (10/2/1988 - 3/26/1989)	Nippon TV Sunday 10:30 Timeframe Miracle Giants Dome-kun (April 2, 1989 – March 25, 1990)	Succeeded by Sports Jockey Nakahata-kun and Tokumitsu-kun (4/1/1990 - 8/25/1990)
