= List of Kiba characters =

This is a list of characters from the Japanese anime television series Kiba. The series is set on a fictional universe where the characters are divided into different factions and races. It also features monster-like beings, known as "Spirits", which can be controlled by Shard Casters.

== Key Spirits ==
=== Amir Gaoul ===
The strongest member of the 6 "Key Spirits" of the show. At first, Amir Gaoul appeared as a turquoise being, who could summon two feathered wings to create its powerful wind-based attacks. After it started morphing, it first awakened as a phoenix; then, at its second awakening, it returned to its humanoid form, this time with the addition of feathered, golden armor. In its final form, Amir Gaoul is able to open its eyes. Its rightful, chosen owner is Zed. Amir Gaoul probably chooses Zed because they both desire an end to the meaningless fights between the nations. Since Amir Gaoul is the strongest of all 6 key Spirits, it cannot be taken from Zed unless Amir Gaoul chooses to break that relationship. Anyone attempting to use Amir Gaoul against its will, other than Zed, will experience extreme pain or death as evidenced from Master Zico's numerous attempts of finding Amir Gaoul's vessel.

=== Pronimo ===
In the very beginning it was split up with Zymot having half and the Kalb-Hu the other half. Hugh was able to combine the two together to form Pronimo in the invasion of Kalb-Hu. Pronimo's final form became a red faceless nude woman humanoid with long red hair and blue half mask used for her beam attacks. Later when Hugh was killed, Zed's mother took Pronimo. She then lost it to Xeem, who gave it to Tusk's savior, Mirred. After being unable to control Tusker, Noah took it from her.

=== Sachura ===
Noah's key Spirit that he received from a group of nomads called Seekers, shortly after entering the world. Sachura was taken by Mirred so she could awaken Tusker, but when Mirred couldn't control Tusker, Noah took back Sachura.

=== Monadi ===
Neotopia's key Spirit. It was hidden under the statue being built as a symbol of power and Absolute Justice at Neotopia, but when Neotopia fell under Tusk's control, it awoke, and was obtained by Sara, Zed's mother. Later, Sara lost Monadi to Xeem. Xeem gave it to Mirred to summon Tusker, but when she failed to satisfy Tusker's desire for a strong host, Noah took it.

=== Dynamis ===
Tusk's key Spirit, which remained dormant in Tusk's savior, Mirred, until all other key Spirits were in the vicinity. When Mirred fails to summon Tusker, Noah takes Dynamis from her.

=== Shadin ===
Key Spirit of the Seekers. Sagiri was given Shadin when she returned to the Seekers, as she was viewed as the savior. She gave Shadin to Zed in order to help him find Noah. Later, Xeem took Shadin from Zed and gave it to Mirred. When Mirred fails to summon Tusker, Noah takes Shadin from her.

=== Tusker ===
In the anime, Tusker is the result of the 6 Key Spirits brought together. Tusker is said to be the power that created and can destroy the world. It has the ability to control all Spirits (Ex-Machina was the only Spirit that couldn't be controlled by Tusker probably because it was a compound spirit similar to Tusker). Tusker needs to merge with the true savior, who appeared to be Zed (Zed, Mirred, Noah, and Sagiri are considered saviors because they were chosen by the Key Spirits), and its goal turned out to be the creation of a world that only included Spirits. Zed was able to stop Tusker by - due to the influence of Zico, who appeared in his conscience - separating himself and Amil Gaoul from Tusker. Once Zed separated Amil Gaoul, Tusker was thrown off balance and defeated. Tusker's abilities consist of close combat fighting, the manipulation of other Spirits, the original 6 Key Spirit's abilities, and the unleashing of meteor showers that destroy the land.

== Templar ==
Tempurā (テンプラー)

=== Zed ===
Zed (ゼッド, Zeddo)

Voiced by: Hiroyuki Yoshino (Japanese); Leraldo Anzaldua (English)
Zed is a 15-year-old boy originally from Calm, a city where the wind doesn't blow. While in Calm, Zed has a somewhat unusual habit: breaking doors and gates. He claims that by doing this he "feels that he can go anywhere". While on the run from the police of Calm, he encounters a space-time crevasse that leads him to the land of Templar, where he meets the sage, Zico and his disciple, Roya. He draws his Shards from a set of three crystals on his left arm. The blade he wields is red, requiring three Shards to form. His Spirit, Amil Gaoul, appears to be a wind-based entity that uses two large, white-feathered wings as weapons. These wings have proven capable of slicing through other Spirits, as well as humans. In the beginning, Zed is teleported in the middle of a battle between Zico and a Tuskan warrior. He is very bewildered and after Zico wins, Zed faints from shock. Later he is arrested for assaulting Dumas and Templar officers. During his battle with Dumas is when he first encounters Amil Gaoul. At first, he is unable to control it. Later he settles in with Dumas for training, but Dumas doesn't do much but plant. Dumas then tells him, "you must build physical strength before you learn to control your Spirit." When he enters the Joust in place of Mikey, he fights well, beating his opponents. When he faces Robès, he is asked to unleash his Spirit. Since Zed didn't know how, he fought with his shard sword. Robes put down his shard sword and claimed not to use a single shard. He fought well at first but as Zed pinned him down he used an electric shard to knock Zed back. Then he released his Spirit and knocked Zed out of the ring. At the end of the anime he was told he was Tusker by Tusker's power. In the last episode, Zed wants to fight Amil Gaoul, so he can find out who he really is. He is about to strike Amil Gaoul, when a portal opens up and he falls through it. It then shows him on a rooftop in Calm, where the wind has been restored, with Amil Gaoul's blue eyes, except he has no pupils. He then says "Let's go, Amil Gaoul." Then he jumps off the roof. There is a flash of light and Zed appears flying with Amil Gaoul's wings.

=== Roya ===
Roya (ロイア)

Voiced by: Nana Mizuki (Japanese); Brittney Karbowski (English)
Roya is a 16-year-old Tuskan native, living in Templar, she is the disciple of the elder sage Zico, who rescued 6-year-old Roya from Tusk. She was to be killed after it was predicted that she would kill her father, Morocco. Therefore, as growing up in Templar, she was falsely told that she was an orphan. She is a new-found friend of Zed, and old friend of Mikki. She draws shards from a crystal on her neck resembling a blue pendant. She has two weapons resembling sais. These blue weapons require three shards each to activate. Her Spirit, Apcarel, is a water-based entity capable of flight. On top of this, it is able to call forth a harp. Upon plucking the strings of said harp, energy arrows are shot.

After learning she was from Tusk (due to the sharp protrusions on her shoulders), Roya left Templar to find her real parents. After arriving in Tusk, she discovered that her father was a Tuskan Lord. Her father believed that Roya will kill him because of a prophecy. As a result, he attempts to have Roya executed. It is also at this time that Roya encounters her mother, who saved Roya when she was a child, but died in the process. Before her death, she transferred her soul into her killer in order to protect Roya, resulting in the killer and the mother sharing a body. Zed tracks Roya down and, with the help of Ginga, manages to rescue her, but not before the death of both her parents.

Later, Roya would accompany Zed and Robès to the Neotopian Joust to represent Templar. Despite some difficulty, she manages to win her first fight, but is seriously wounded. While recovering in the hospital, she has a dream of her mother, and finally decides which 'path' she wishes to lead her life by; to help others. It is at this time that she acquires the 'healing shard'. She then proceeds to help heal other patients in the hospital. However, under Neotopia's totalitarian rules, Roya is arrested for healing people without a license to practice medicine. As with all those that break 'any' rule of Neotopia, Roya is sentenced to death, but is saved by Zed before the execution is complete.

After Zed was kidnapped by Neotopia, Roya left to find him and found herself in the middle of the invasion by Zymot and Tusk's forces. She managed to find him and later attempted to heal Hairam after he ran himself through with his own sword, but ultimately was unable to help him. She accompanies Zed and Ginga back to Ulvarx to stop Tusk's invasion of the small nation. Zico has hinted that even though Roya has chosen 'her' path, she may be the only one capable of giving Zed the 'strength' to fulfill his own destiny.

After Zed's confrontation with his mother, Sara, Roya helps him escape from prison after he is put there by Zico. Roya is also strongly protective of Sagiri, especially when the little girl comes to Templar to escape the Seekers. When Zed and Sagiri later leave with the Seekers on their flying ship, Roya is distressed by the feeling that their parting may be the last time she ever sees Zed again. Shortly afterward, Roya begins working with a doctor, using her healing shards to help patients. While she seems to have finally found happiness, the uncertainty of Zed's current whereabouts still troubles her greatly.

After learning that Zico is going to Tusk to look for Zed, Roya begs him to take her with him. Roya tells him that she has to be by Zed's side to help him. Zico agrees and they both fly to Tusk on Zico's Spirit, Pyron. They find Zed and learn about what has happened in Tusk concerning the Key Spirits. Roya is present when Zed's mother, Sara, reappears. Despite her protest, Zed goes off with his mother saying he'll be back. Later, Sara emerges wielding Amil Gaoul, and fights Zico. Roya searches for Zed and asks him why he gave up his Key Spirit. When Zed angrily refuses to answer, Roya berates him, saying that he still has a mother, unlike her, and that Sara can still be saved.

As they leave to stop Sara, Zed is confronted by Dukeham and Zed tells Roya to leave while he deals with the crazed Tuskan. Roya arrives as Zico is being defeated by Sara, but witnesses the Key Spirit reject her. Sara collapses and Roya cradles her as she dies. Before finally passing away, Sara gives her Amil Gaoul's shard and whispers some words to her. Moments later, Zed arrives, Roya gives him back the Key Spirit, and also gives Zed the final words of his mother.

In the end, she sees Zed leave with Amil Gaoul. Later, back in Templar, she's seen taking Noah to the hill that Zed used to always look out from, as she longs for his return.

=== Zico ===
Jīko (ジーコ) Voiced by: Tamio Ōki (Japanese); Charles C. Campbell (English)
Zico is a 79-year-old man and is one of six sages of Templar; He has a rather calm and wise yet playful personality. Zico is the teacher of Roya, a girl of noble birth that he had saved, when she was a child. After Zed arrives, Zico acts as his mentor, and gives him advice on many occasions. Throughout the series, Zico seldom leaves Templar, but stays to regulate their politics and authority.

Zico possesses a very strong Spirit (due to his own strong will) called Pryon that seems to want to be captured by the military of Zymot. His Spirit is on a power level with Rambos (Zed's second Spirit). Zico's Spirit is a large red dragon that has many curves on its body, in which it regularly breathes large amounts of fire to completely destroy its opponents.

Zico often stresses caution and observation over rash action, and is quick to provide 'fatherly' advise to both Roya and Zed when they are experiencing periods of doubt. He was a friend of Neotopia's ruler, Hyrum, and was distressed to see how Hyrum had transformed Neotopia into a harsh state. Conversations between the two seemed to reveal that once Hyrum was much like Zico, but had become radical later in life.

Recent events have revealed that Zico was not always the kind and patient man he is now. Revelations about Zico's past have surfaced recently since the appearance of Zed's mother, Sara. It became obvious that Sara hated Zico, and Zico was hiding something that was of great pain to him. Zico later revealed to Zed that Amil Gaoul had once been the guardian Spirit of Templar but no one could wield him, not even Zico. To ensure Templar's survival, Zico had begun an aggressive campaign to find a Shard Caster for the Key Spirit. This appears to have gone on for some time until Zico discovered that Amil Gaoul had chosen someone else. Zico had been shown a vision of Zed's young mother, pregnant with Zed.

Zico traveled to Calm and abducted Zed's mother, Sara, and took her back to Templar where she was forcefully turned into a Shard Caster and received Amil Gaoul's shard. Zico then rigorously trained Sara to one day wield the Spirit, often working Sara so hard she would collapse at night from fatigue and pain. Later, Zico defended Templar from an invasion by Zymot. It was during this battle that Sara tried to call out Amil Gaoul, and when he appeared he abandoned Sara and left. Realizing that Sara was not the chosen one, Zico turned his back on Sara and told her to return to Calm.

After meeting Zed, Zico came to the realization that he had made a mistake thinking Sara was the chosen Shard Caster of Amil Gaoul. It was not Sara who was chosen, but her unborn child, Zed, growing in her womb, who was the chosen one. When Zed attempts to follow his mother, Zico intervenes and blocks his path. After exchanging angry words, he and Zed battle each other, and Zico knocks Zed unconscious with a swift blow to the gut. He then locks Zed up in a cell. After Zed awakens, Zico tries to explain that Sara has been possessed by the power that the Amil Gaoul possesses. As he was responsible for making her a Shard Caster, it is his responsibility to stop her rampage.

Zico sets out on Pyron searching for Sara and finds her some time later in the act of absorbing more life force energy. A battle ensues and Zico's Spirit soon faces off against Sara's Key Spirits, Menadi and Pronimo. However, Pyron is able to not only withstand the two Key Spirits, but push them back. Zico explains to the stunned Sara that she could never control a Key Spirit, and as such she can't truly bring out Menadi and Pronimo's power. Just as he begins to gain the upper hand, Sagiri appears and Sara grabs the little girl to use as a human shield. Unable to attack, Zico can only defend against Sara's merciless shard attacks. Eventually Zico is overpowered and collapses.

Some time after, Zed leaves with the Seekers, Zico and the other sages of Templar sense a power surge from Tusk. Believing it has something to do with Zed, Zico leaves to investigate. Roya confronts him and convinces him to let her go along. They fly to Tusk on Pyron and begin searching for him. As they separate, Roya is attacked by Sara, but Zico repels her attacks. Sara attempts to fight, but is so weak she can't even cast a shard. Zico tells her that in her condition, trying to wield Amil Gaoul would be fatal. Sara comments that she doesn't care and flees.

Zico and Roya then locate Zed and learn about the events surrounding Noa, Mirred, and the strange black Spirit. Shortly afterward, Zed goes off with his mother, Sara. Later, Sara re-emerges with Amil Gaoul's shard and Zico confronts her demanding the return of the Key Spirit. Sara summons Amil Gaoul and battles Zico and Pyron. His Spirit is no match for Amil Gaoul and Zico collapses to his knees. Before Sara can finish the fight, however, her body is overcome by the stress of wielding Amil Gaoul and collapses. Roya arrives and holds Sara as she dies. Zico can only look on in sorrow, unable to help her.

During Noa and Zed's final battle, he ordered Roya not to interfere with their battle. It's revealed that he, too, wanted to see Tusker resurrected. Unfortunately, he was horrified over the fact that the power he sought was destroying the world. When Tusker merges with Zed, and Tusker controls all the Spirits, he saves Roya from Afkeruru, but subsequently dies in the process. He then appears as a Spirit within Tusker to talk with Zed. He ultimately persuaded Zed to come to his senses when he reminded him of how his mother ended up dead after seeking power. Zico is never heard from again.

=== Robès Redondo ===
Robesu Redondo (ロベス・レドンド) Voiced by: Shin-ichiro Miki (Japanese); Chris Kennedy (English)

His name and mansion "Redondo House" all inherited from his father, Altajid Redondo. He is a princely figure living in Templar. He became the Shard Champion after winning the Shard Casters Jousting tournament. For fun he wears a mask, and under the name "No Face", likes to rob the townspeople of their riches. He wishes to know whether he or Dumas is stronger, but was denied the chance when Dumas let Zed fight in his place against Robès in the tournament. Robès draws his Shards from a yellow crystal on his right hand. His weapon is yellow and resembles a rapier. It uses two Shards, placed in the hilt of his weapon. His Spirit, Belladonna (ベラドンナ, Beradonna), resembles a mushroom-like ballerina, and slashes down foes with its arms. It has also been shown that Belladonna is capable of flight. In episode 13, it is revealed that Robès can use water shards as well as lightning shards.

In the end, he was disappointed to hear that Zed, his potential rival, had left.

=== Mikki ===
Mikkī (ミッキー) Voiced by: Nobuhisa Nakamoto (Japanese); Corey Hartzog (English)

A baker by trade and a former apprentice to Dumas. He is a friend of Roya and Zed. He is given Dumas' Spirit after Dumas was killed and had serious difficulty controlling it. He seems to be romantically interested in Pino, a maid of Robès.

Mikki seems to be a childhood friend of Roya. Mikki makes his first appearance in episode 2, in which he elaborates on his will to live up to the expectations of his sensei, Dumas. Mikki works hard every day within a field-like area, accomplishing simple tasks with Dumas. After Dumas was forced to leave his house, Mikki takes him to live in his family's abandoned house with Zed and Roya. This is when Mikki decides to start baking unique style bread as his new occupation, as a way to attain money. Other than baking bread, Mikki attempts to regularly become stronger as a Shard Caster, but seems to always fail in this endeavour due to having a kind and gentle heart. After Mikki later hears of Dumas' death, he seems to go insane. He kept striving for more power as to quell his suffering about how he could have been able to save Dumas if he had been stronger at the time. This insanity was caused when Robès had handed Mikey Dumas's Spirit. This seems to be a primary factor within the ways of the Spirit. Mikki later recovers from this and returns to baking.

Later, Mikki decides to give up shard casting and devote all his time to baking. He admits that he has more skill at business than fighting. As if to reinforce this notion, Mikki's bakery has become so popular in Templar that he has recently opened a branch store. Pino and another of Robès's maids have quit their job at Robès's mansion and are now working for Mikki full-time.

Mikki's Spirit: Mikki's Spirit's name is Arumadoru. It never accomplishes anything within the series due to being rather undisciplined, which reflects Mikki's weak will. Mikki attempted to use this Spirit when training with Roya, along with battling at the Joust tournament. He has Slugna, Dumas' old Spirit which Robès gave to him as a memento, but never used it in any battles other than when he was controlled by it.

=== Dumas Schuramux ===
Dyumasu Shukuramukusu (デュマス・シュクラムクス) Voiced by: Hiroshi Yanaka (Japanese); Rob Mungle (English)

Templar's previous Shard Champion, a title given to the strongest Shard Caster in the country. Even though he held the prestigious title, he works as a farmer. He had turned the basement of his house into a hospital for those of the country of Zymot who have been cast into exile, but when they started attacking the castle he helped to defend it against them. Dumas draws his Shards from an aqua-colored crystal on his right shoulder. His weapon is a brownish-orange and is about twice the width of Zed's sword. His shard element is earth. It requires six Shards to activate. His Spirit, Suraguna, resembles a knight and fights with a weapon that is a cross between a lance and a double-bladed sword.

Dumas bears a cross-like mark on his left palm, an inherited symbol of servitude that has run in his family for generations. He is obsessed with changing this 'destiny', and sought to do so by becoming the Shard Champion. To his chagrin, all that came with the title of Shard Champion was "useless honor" and being the first person to call when trouble came about, with no change in his station or position. Obsession turned to madness, and he became Zymot's usurpers' spy, the Joker, in exchange for marriage to Princess Rebecca.

Hugh had no intention of honoring his bargain with Dumas, and intended to have him and a captured Robès kill each other off. The duel was more or less even (though Suraguna defeated Belladonna) until Zed showed up. Armed with a new sword and his more controllable Spirit, Rambos, Zed easily defeated Dumas. Afterward, Gláucio executed the exhausted Dumas by shocking and strangling him with his flail and throwing him into the fire pits surrounding the Zymot Jousting ring.

== Zymot ==
Jīmoto (ジーモット)

=== Rebecca ===
Rebekka (レベッカ) Voiced by: Marina Inoue (Japanese); Serena Varghese (English)

A princess who is the last surviving member of the Zymot royal family. Seeing Zed's powerful Spirit, she asks for his help to regain her country.

Rebecca, a beautiful young girl, is the princess of Zymot. After Hugh had lusted to attain the power of the Key Spirits, he attempted to steal one of these Key Spirits which was in the hands of Rebecca's father, who had been the king of Zymot. Before the supposed death of the king, however, he placed the Spirit within the crest on Rebecca's head. Rebecca is saved by her bodyguard, Elda, after being captured by Hugh. At one time, after being saved, she stayed with Zed and Roya at their house. After she found out that Zed wields the mighty Amil Gaoul, she asked Zed to accompany her to Zymot, as to serve amongst her established defense against Hugh.

Hugh gets his hands on her and tricks Dumas into thinking that he can become the new king of Zymot if he is to marry her. Rebecca soon finds out that her father was alive, because only he can release the Spirit from Rebecca's forehead. After this task was completed, Hugh kills Rebecca's father and lets Rebecca do whatever she wanted, since she became useless to him. Rebecca then travelled into the desert area, blurting the words that she would have liked to be reborn as a bird, and that she doesn't want to be born as herself.

Rebecca is "reborn" as a warrior, and vows revenge against Hugh. To achieve her goal, she allies with the people of Kalbu-fu as a primary force against Zymot, which is because she had heard that Zymot was planning on launching an attack against that area. Zed and Roya soon assist Rebecca, in which they then end up battling against many soldiers of Zymot. After Rebecca spots Hugh, she attempts to run after him, but is soon stopped by Elmeida. A while after this, Rebecca battles relentlessly against Elmeida. However, Rebecca, who jumps in the way as to save one of her fellow people of Kalbu-fu, is stabbed by Elmeida's blade. After Zymot retreats, Rebecca lies on her bed for the last time. She utters how she now feels truly free of her inner hatred, she then dies in peace, without any regret.

Rebecca's Spirit - Rebecca's Spirit is a lightning type Spirit called Ariel. Its main attacks are lightnings cast forth from its arms. Ariel can also be controlled even if Rebecca is far away from Ariel.

=== Elda ===
Voiced by: Komina Matsushita (Japanese); Kara Greenberg (English)

Rebecca's body guard. She is different from the other members of the rebel army, who all neglect Rebecca. She later fights to her death against Hugh in order to protect Rebecca.

=== Philip ===
Firuppu (フィルップ) Voiced by: Norihisa Mori (Japanese); John Paul Green (English)

A member of the rebel army fighting against those who have overthrown the Zymot Monarchy. He is only seeking power for himself. He is killed by Glaudio as he seeks the reward from the Zymot usurpers for successfully persuading Rebecca to return to the castle and to agree to marriage.

=== Hugh ===
Hyū (ヒュー) Voiced by: Kappei Yamaguchi (Japanese); Andrew Love (English)

The head of the three Zymot Usurpers and the main antagonist of series 1 and a major antagonist of series 2. He wears a mask over his mouth until Amil Gaoul (the Key Spirit he stole from Zed) rejects him. He has a strict personality, but acts somewhat insane after he's rejected by Amil Gaoul. He is the previous owner of the Key Spirit, Pronimo, later stolen by Sara after Hugh's defeat.

Hugh's first appearance was in episode 7, in which he's shown next to his two primary officers, Glaudio and Elmelda. He used Dumas as a spy, manipulating Dumas in believing he will become the next king of Zymot by marrying Rebecca.

At an earlier age, Hugh acted as the primary retainer under Rebecca's father, who was the king of Zymot at the time. One day, however, Hugh had attempted to kill him, which was when the king placed his half key Spirit into Rebecca's forehead. Due to this fact, Hugh continuously captured Rebecca and later convinced Rebecca's father, whom he had let live, that he would marry Rebecca and become the new king of Zymot. This is only a trick, however, in order to make Rebecca's father release the shard within her head. After Hugh receives the shard, he kills Rebecca's father and casts her away, free to do whatever she wishes. After this event, Hugh became the new King of Zymot, and lusts to obtain every key Spirit he can get his hands on; this is Hugh's true ambition.

Hugh then furthers his influence by gaining the trust of many major figures within Tusk. After Hugh's campaign in the Kalbu-fu region, he meets up with Zed and finally realizes that he has Amil Gaoul in his possession. Hugh flees after he realizes that his key Spirit Pronimo (becomes whole after fusing with the fire half) cannot stand against Amil Gaoul. After Roya was to be sacrificed at a different time by the creatures of Tusk, Hugh takes glimpse of Noa's key Spirit along with Zed's, which makes his ambition burn even stronger. Hugh later retreats and continues to elaborate on his superiority within the series.

Hugh later participated in the Neotopian Joust, disguised as a representative of Tusk. After Zed was 'defeated' by Noa and taken to a hospital to recover, Hugh crept into his room at night and stole Amil Gaoul. The next day, Hugh, still in disguise, faced off against Noa in the final match of the Joust. During the battle, Noa knocked off Hugh's helmet revealing his true identity. At this point, Hugh summoned Pronimo to battle against Sachira, but then summoned Amil Gaoul to double-team Noa. Just when it seemed that Noa was defeated, Hugh was overcome with intense pain and regurgitated Amil Gaoul's shard. Noa, mentioned that Amil Gaoul had rejected Hugh, and the pain he was feeling was his punishment. Before he could be captured, Hugh teleported away, back to Zymot.

After returning to Zymot, Hugh stopped wearing his mask and revealed his true face, a menacing, devilish visage. It seems that the after-effects of having Amil Gaoul have also twisted Hugh, making him slightly insane. He has recently begun an invasion of Neotopia along with an army of Tusk beastmen.

Zed hits Hugh with a shard explosive and then stabs him through the torso. Pronimo and Amil Gaoul return to their owners as Hugh drops dead, revealing a face clothed once again.

Hugh is visually depicted as having the traits of one of the Three wise monkeys.

=== Elmeida ===
Elmeda (エルメイダ) Voiced by: Erino Hazuki (Japanese); Melissa Davis (English)

The female member of the three Zymot leaders who wears a blindfold over her eyes. Elmeida is the only Zymot Usurper that is still alive. She was one of two supreme commanders of Zymot that served under Hugh, the last King of Zymot. Elmeida typically wears the blindfold on her face to conceal the crystal from which she draws her shards. She is seen on multiple occasions eating snails. It also seems that Elmeida has a rather arrogant personality and is rather merciless in her qualities.

She made her first true appearance in episode 10 when she and Glaudio had fought against the Shard Casters from Templer that had invaded their territory. Elmeida is also the one to thank for retrieving Rebecca many times. She is later sent as the head commander when attacking the area of Kalbu-fu. While at this area, she duels against Rebecca, whom she later kills by stabbing her with her blade. After she finished off Rebecca, Elmelda retreats under Hugh's orders.

After Hugh's death, it is revealed that Elmeida is really working for Xeem and her original objective was to keep an eye on Hugh.

In the end, she stays as the second-in-command of Zymot.

Elmeida is also visually depicted as having the traits of one of the Three wise monkeys.

Elmeida's Spirit: Elmeida's Spirit is a large winged monster that has a skull as its face called Zakua. Zakua has the ability of being able to extend the spike within its right eye to a large extent, which is used primarily to impale its enemies.

=== Glaudio ===
Guraujio (グラウジオ) Voiced by: Aya Endo (Japanese); Greg Ayres (English)

The child member of the three Zymot leaders. His ears are covered bandages. Despite being a child, his power is extraordinarily high. Glaudio is assumed to be deceased, as Elmelda accuses Zed of killing him.

Glaudio is a child with blonde hair that had been recruited by Hugh at a rather young age. Glaudio served as one of the two main enforcers (the other being Elmelda) under Hugh's command. Glaudio made his first real appearance in episode 9, in which he unleashes his Spirit to dispose of the remaining allies that had failed in their mission. Glaudio seems to favor duels when assisted by Elmelda. It also seems that Hugh favors Glaudio when it comes to quickly cleaning up messes, such as when he finished off Dumas in episode 13. Glaudio would afterwards have a 1-on-1 duel with Zed, however, Zed ends up defeating Glaudio by attaching a certain explosive shard to his body. He was presumed dead after he fell into the fire pits of the jousting ring.

Gladudio is also visually depicted as having the traits of one of the Three wise monkeys.

Glaudio's Spirit: Glaudio's Spirit takes the appearance of a large monster, in which it can freely open its body (which seems to serve as a large jaw) for quick disposal style tactics. Glaudio's Spirit reappeared during the war with Neotopia, when Hugh was using multiple Spirits to obliterate the Neotopian people.

=== Nudeu ===
Nudu (ヌデュー) Voiced by: Takashi Kondō

Nedeu was Glaudio's replacement after Zed killed him. Nudeu enters the Joust in Neotopia as one of the representatives from Zymot. He seemed like he was going to win his fight against Robès but was defeated. He gets Robès drunk on wine after their match hoping to steal Belladonna but was foiled by a disguised Hugh. He later took part in the war against Neotopia. He was killed by Noah.

Nudeu's Spirit: Its name is Marakia. It has a bizarre appearance, and seems to be made of four connected blobs with a tail.

== Neotopia ==
Neotopia (ネオトピア)

=== Noah ===
Noa (ノア) Voiced by: Kazuma Horie (Japanese); Chris Patton (English)

Noah is Zed's friend from Calm. Unlike Zed, Noah is thought of as an upstanding citizen of Calm. Noah sticks up for Zed whenever people speak badly of him. Though others disapprove, Noah hangs around with Zed because Zed saved him from bullies during their childhood. Noah also gave Zed a token of their friendship; two feathers attached by a sort of round metal. Noah is plagued with a disease which forces him to always wear a brace around his neck and spine. He is given a life expectancy of thirty, and anything that causes drastic movements will shorten it. After Zed goes through the portal to Templar, Noah is eventually teleported to a militaristic land called Neotopia and begins making friends while staying with Carter, the man who found him, and his wife. Later, he is known as Lord Dolga, and is found working for the Tuskans. At the end of the anime he is seen in a wheelchair with Roya. He throws a paper airplane, which is taken by the wind and later lands near Zed in Calm.

=== Aisha ===
Aisha (アイシャ) Voiced by: Erino Hazuki (Japanese); Maggie Flecknoe (English)

A young girl that had been a citizen of Neotopia since childhood. Throughout her childhood, Aisha would become friends with a boy by the name of Keith, along with Gale. Aisha and Keith would always want to remain independent in their actions - as to be void of the strict Neotopian rules, they would occasionally sit at night amongst glowing flowers that provide light to the sky, and hide out in their established stone monument. Gale, however, joined the military when told to, which changed his life to a high extent. Aisha later meets Noah, in which she and Keith treat them as their old friend, Gale. However, when Gale returns and relatively destroys the previous peaceful ways of Neotopia, Aisha is amongst a large conflict. After Gale is about to slash and kill Keith for destroying the newly established laws, Aisha jumped in the way and was fatally wounded. Aisha lives long enough to transport the terror stricken Noah out of Neotopia to a remote country.

=== Gale ===
Geiru (ゲイル) Voiced by: Shinnosuke Tachibana (Japanese); Blake McMahon (English)

He's Carter's son and childhood friends with Keith and Aisha. He joins the military of Neotopia. After discovering that the village had not informed the Neotopian government of Noah's appearance, he kills his father and begins the destruction of his village, Ratt. Gale seeks to completely change the ways of Neotopia in a far more irrational authoritative governmental leadership system. Gale later attempts to kill Noah after he had run away, which led to Aisha trying to stop him and he tried to slash her. He was killed in his battle by Keith.

=== Keith ===
Kīsu (キース) Voiced by: Tōru Nara (Japanese); Brandon Hearnsberger (English)

One of the village youth (most notably the village that Noah was guest at, which is in Neotopia) that attacked Noah. At first, he assumed that Noah was some enemy soldier, or spy, working for the government when he saw Noah looking at the monument at the cliff near the village he was staying at. His Spirit is a centurion type of beast. While most people enlist in the Neotopian army as soon as possible, Keith rejects this way of life, seeming to only want to have fun. He fights with Gale after he wounds Aisha. Along with Gale, he was assumed to be dead, but turns up in Templar as a prisoner escaped from Neotopia. His wounds were healed by the government of Neotopia only so that he could later be executed for treason.

Zed and Roya are asked to escort him back to Neotopia. However, due to some circumstances during the shifting teleportation, Keith, Zed, and Roya end up in the land of Tusk. Noah, now indoctrinated into the laws of Neotopia, finally meets Zed in Tusk, and executes Keith by order of the government after Zed leaves.

=== Diana ===
Daiana (ダイアナ) Voiced by: Yumi Hikita (Japanese); Elizabeth Bunch (English)

Hairam's second in command and the one responsible for Noah being transported to Neotopia. She manipulated Noah into joining them believing that "absolute law" was the right form of justice. After witnessing the devastation of Neotopia by Hugh's forces, the fanatically loyal Diana 'rebels' against Hairam. The first factor in this change was Hairam's insistence that the people of Neotopia sacrifice themselves in battle, yet Hairam himself ran and hid from the enemy. The final straw was her anger at the impossibly heavy burden Hairam placed on Noah to be the 'savior' of Neotopia, a responsibility that was driving Noah to have a nervous breakdown. It has been revealed that Diana has a deep affection for Noah and wants to help him rebuild Neotopia. After a battle with Sara and a newly emerged key Spirit, Monardi, Diana fell down a crevasse in the earth.

It is later learned that Diana survived the destruction of Neotopia, when she resurfaces in Tusk looking for Noah. She witnesses the aftermath of Noah and Zed's feud. When Noah absorbs five of the six Key Spirits, she watches him leave with a look of concern on her face. She then encounters Noah at a disclosed location, but is distraught over the fact that the Noah standing in front of her is no longer the one she knew. She later approaches Noah after he resurrects Tusker, pleading that he let go of the power. She momentarily had Noah reconsider until she was knocked out by the power of Tusker. Her unconscious body is seen being carried by a revived Noah after Tusker is destroyed.

=== Kira ===
kira (キーラ) Voiced by: Komina Matsushita (Japanese); Jessica Boone (English)

The only female of the Royal knights of Neotopia that enforces the ultimate rules. At first, she had a sort of rivalry with Noah, but begins to develop feelings for him. It was later revealed that her brother is Herrick and her real name is Chelsea. The rest of her family was banished to Ulvarx for breaking the ultimate rules. The only reason why she wasn't banished was because she had potential as a Shard Caster. Kira draws her Shards from a green crystal in her navel.

In the end, she stays in Neotopia, rebuilding the city after the destruction caused by the war.

=== Hyrum ===
Hairam (ハイラム) Voiced by: Tomohisa Asō (Japanese); Jovan Jackson (English)

The leader and founder of Neotopia, he enforced the Ultimate Rules with an iron fist, and seemed to have a past history with Templer's sage, Ziko. Zed and Roya were subjected to the ultimate rules during the Neotopian joust. Elmeida nearly assassinated Hyrum, but Noa intervened to save his life. He strongly believed that Noah is a savior of Neotopia and the Ultimate Rules. Neotopians that were banished to Ulvarx (especially Helic) hold a strong hatred towards Hyrum. Hugh's army attacked Neotopia and managed to break the third wall surrounding the castle. All seemed lost at that point, and when faced with the murder of hostages and Hugh's demands for Hairam, Zed delivered Hyrum to Hugh. Hugh offers to let him live for as long as it takes Hyrum to murder the captives, but instead he chooses to kill himself. Roya attempts to heal Hyrum, but is unable to do so. His last wish is for Zico to watch over Noah and the Ultimate Rules.

== Tusk ==
Task (タスク)

=== Mirred ===
Mirette (ミレッド) Voiced by: Rika Morinaga (Japanese), Cynthia Martinez (English)

A young and free-Spirited Tuskan girl with a tragic past. Mirred was born with the Key Spirit, Dynamis, already inside her body. As such Mirred was dubbed the 'savior' of Tusk. Since the day of her birth, she has been isolated and confined to a small tower above the Tusk Palace, where she can be kept 'safe'. Though she has been visited by all of the four ministers, it is Gitra that is her primary guardian. She enjoys listening to the music that Gitra plays on a large pipe organ that she can hear from her room. Later, after expressing a desire to see a real sky, Molima gives her two 'shifting shards' that allows her to escape the castle. She explored the area around her, wide-eyed at all the things she has heard of, but never seen. She eventually encountered a man named Dolga, who showed her the insides of Tote's Cave, which resembles a night sky. Mirred was eventually found by Tusk soldiers in Gitra's care, but escapes again where she runs into Zed, who had just arrived in Tusk.

When Zed returns and reveals that he not only failed to get the other key Spirits, but also lost his own, Mirred decides to return to the palace. She feels that Zed's failure is a sign that she can't escape her 'destiny'. Zed has a private moment with her and gets her to confess that she truly doesn't want to be a 'savior', but she also doesn't want to run anymore. Zed asks her to let him take her burden, but she runs off before giving him an answer. Wanting to see Dolga and the 'stars' again, she returns to Tote's Cave and finds Lord Dolga there. She is at first happy, but her joy then turns to horror as Dolga demands she give him her key Spirit. Zed and Gitra arrive, but then Xeem and several squads of Tusk soldiers also arrive.

As a battle prepares to begin, Mirred's sorrow and shock at what's happening causes her own key Spirit, Dynamis, to awaken and emerge. The Spirit then draws all the other key shards to it and the shards revolve around in the air. Then all six key shards descend and enter Mirred's body. As the others look on, Mirred is surrounded by a black haze and a massive black Spirit, with long gray wings covering its face, appears. Xeem says that the Spirit is the true form of the combined key Spirits, Tusker. Mirred was unable to handle the resurrection of Tusker. When the key Spirits leave her body and go to Noah, she wakes up without her memories. Gitra becomes her caregiver, taking her on a journey to see the world.

=== Gitra ===
Gitora (ギトラ) Voiced by: Takuma Terashima (Japanese)

The younger brother of Xeem, and one of the four 'Ministers' of Tusk. Gitra's primary role is as Mirred's guardian and caregiver. As Mirred is never allowed to leave her tower, Gitra will frequently play a large pipe organ that Mirred can hear from her room. After Mirred escapes from the castle, Gitra goes on a desperate search for her and eventually finds her. Instead of taking her directly back to the castle, he takes her to his secret sanctuary. They manage to hide there for a short time before being discovered by Tusk soldiers. Gitra makes Mirred escape while he blocks the soldiers. After catching up, he confronts Zed and then Dukeham. After Zed defeats Dukeham and reveals his reason for being in Tusk, Gitra helps Zed enter the palace. His reasoning is that if Zed can acquire all the Key Spirits, then Mirred will finally be free of her 'fate' as the savior of Tusk.

Gitra fights with blue shards, that instead of being water-based, are in fact based on blue flames. In addition to wielding a sword, Gitra has demonstrated an ability to engulf his entire body in blue flames and then attack using hand-to-hand combat. The blue flames are so intense that he can disintegrate several opponents with a single flaming kick.

After Mirred loses her memories, he becomes her caregiver, and takes her to places to see the world.

=== Xeem ===
Jīmu (ジーム) Voiced by: Takashi Kondo (Japanese), Mark Laskowski (English)

One of the Ministers of Tusk and Gitra's older brother. He brought back the two key Spirits that Sara possessed, to Tusk. He appears to be the oldest member of the four leaders and his voice seems to carry the most weight. In addition to being fanatically loyal to Mirred, he is also an accomplished fighter and is able to handle two Key Spirits for a short time in battle. Xeem is present when Mirred absorbs all the key shards and the Spirit, Tusker, emerges. After Mirred collapses from the strain, Xeem takes her back to the Tusk Castle and places her back in her tower room. He later fights against Zed, Noah, and Gitra when they come and take Mirred back. He witnesses the Spirit, Tusker, break into the separate key Spirits and form a summoning ring. Believing that the true Tusker will emerge, Xeem removes his mask and walks into the center of the circle. To his horror, he is killed when Dynamis incinerates him with a fire blast.

=== Molima ===
Morima (モリマ) Voiced by: Haruhi Terada (Japanese), Stephanie Wittels (English)

A female Shard Caster who is one of the four ministers of Tusk. Not much is known of Molima, but it appears that she has her own goals that do not match those of Xeem or Dukeham. She often feigns allegiance to the idea of getting all the Key Spirits for Mirred, yet her actions speak to a different plan. It was Molima that gave Mirred the 'teleportation' shards that allowed her to escape and seems to not show any urgency with regards to finding the young girl. She is often seen standing in the shadows, more interested in observing than acting.

Her ultimate plan is to make sure that Tusker, the one she adores the most, gets resurrected, in order for him the destroy the current world, and then create a new one. After Noah gains all the key Spirits and resurrects Tusker, she uses a move shard to arrive at his location. Delighted to see that Tusker is right in front of her, she approaches him, but is subsequently stabbed by Noah. At first, she is distraught over the fact that "Lord Dolga" has stabbed her, but as she looks up at Noah's face and leans on him, she feels relieved, and calls him "Lord Tusker". She dies shortly after.

Her weapon is a blue shard powered, short-handled scythe.

=== Dukeham ===
Deucem (デュケム) Voiced by: Ken Takeuchi (Japanese), Brandon Hearnsberger (English)

Dukeham is one of the 4 Leaders of Tusk and a rather mysterious fellow. Like the other members of Tusk he wears a mask, covering his entire face. He led the attack on Ulvarx. From what we have seen, he is a very formidable Shard Caster, easily disposing of Ginga, whom he shares a past with. Dukeham was Ginga's Captain, and Ginga thought that he had killed his beloved Karen, which was a misunderstanding. Ginga also notes that Dukeham was known for caring deeply about those that served him, and Ginga respected him greatly for that.

When Karen failed a mission to sabotage the defense system in Neotopia and returned injured, saying that it was nearly impossible, Dukeham was angered and was about to kill her on the spot. Ginga pleaded for her life and promised to complete the mission in her place. However, he too failed the mission and was assaulted by a number of Neotopian Knights. He lost consciousness and when he regained it, he saw Dukeham standing over Karen with his drawn sword. Enraged, he attacked Dukeham, but Dukeham severely wounded him and left him for dead.

Dukeham explains to Ginga that after he left to go on the mission to Neotopia, Karen pleaded with him to allow her to help Ginga, but he refused. She, however, disobeyed orders and went after Ginga anyway. When he discovered what she had done, he chased after her. She saw Ginga lose consciousness and she ran to fight the Neotopians to save him, but they ended up killing her. Dukeham arrived and killed the Neotopian Knights, which is when Ginga regained consciousness and attacked him.

After battling Zed, Dukeham falls off one of Tusk's floating pieces of land. He later shows up again, sporting a scar across his chest which he received from his battle with Zed. He battles Zed one last time, but faces defeat once again. Dukeham is presumed dead after three fire shards, placed on his back by Zed, explodes.

=== Morocco ===
Morokko (モロッコ) Voiced by: Tomohisa Asō (Japanese)

A rather fat man that had been living within the lands of Tusk since his life had begun. Morocco is the father of Roya, in which he seems to be rather insane due to his great fear of his daughter. Morocco attained this fear by first dealing with a certain witch that had prophesied that Roya would "be the death of him". This insanity greatly prospered after Roya (as a child) had given Morocco a rose as a gift, which pricked his finger, causing for a minor amount of blood loss. This threw him into a state of insanity throughout the rest of his life in which he convinced himself that Roya must die. Due to this fact, Morocco hires Despara to assassinate Roya. Because Roya's mother had joined bodies with Despara right before her death - as a result of her protecting Roya - Morocco could never look Despara in the face without being thrown into fear as to look at his own wife's face.

Ten years into the future when Morocco sees Roya dressed beautifully as the newly adopted daughter of Norman - a high ranking noble man of Tusk - he literally gets on his hands and knees and crawls quickly away from Roya in a moment of extreme fear within his insanity. After this, Morocco finds the whereabouts of Roya, and personally holds her by the throat and attempts to kill her. However, Despara - who became Jesara momentarily - is struck by his blow. Morocco then attempts to flee, but is instantly cut down by Cloud, thus finally ending his life of distortion.

=== Jesara ===
A somewhat minor character within the anime due to only being shown within small intervals. Jesara is Roya's mother. Jesara is first shown in episode 20, where she had been shown leaning on Cloud's shoulder, whom she seems to have a high level of love towards him. When Jesara later hears that Roya has returned to the land of Tusk after ten years, she asked Cloud to tell Roya to meet her at the fallen cathedral within Tusk. After Roya comes up to her mother for the first time (within her memory), Roya realizes that she is soon confronting a woman by the name of Despara instead. It is revealed later in the episode that Jesara had merged her Spirit within Despara's body right before her death, which had taken place when she had protected Roya from Despara. Jesara is only later seen when she had protected Roya again by jumping in the way of Morocco's blade, who had at the time held Roya and intended on killing her. Despara is the one who had truly received the blow, in which Jesara had faded away in death in Cloud's arms, telling him to "live on".

=== Despara ===
Desupara (デスパラ) Voiced by: Hiromi Hirata (Japanese), Luci Christian (English)

A rather young woman that had seemingly been a high-ranking official of Tusk even since a young age. Despara always wears a half-mask around her face - a shared trait amongst the people of Tusk - and has a rather cruel and arrogant personality. Despara is also the right-hand guardian of Morocco, the father of Roya. At one time in which Despara had been ordered to kill Roya, due to Morocco's grand superstition and insanity, Despara had confronted Roya along a small cliff. Roya's mother however had vowed to protect Roya, which led to Roya accidentally falling of the cliff - later to be saved be Jiko - and the supposed death of Roya's mother. However, Roya's mother had quickly thrown her Spirit into that of Despara's, effectively leading Despara to have another person living inside of her.

Despara believes that the only way to get rid of Jesara from her body is to slay Roya. This later leads to Jesara meeting with Roya at a cathedral, but Despara ends up coming out and she attempts to kill Roya. However, Cloud holds Despara at bay, effectively allowing Roya to make her escape. Despara later encounters Roya again, however, Cloud duels her again. After Morocco himself holds Roya, intending on killing her, Despara jumps in the way of the blow (who was taken over by Jesara within a quick moment), and dies. Due to Despara's death, and the unity of their body, they both end up dying as a result.

=== Cloud ===
Kuraudo (クラウド) Voiced by: Tōru Nara (Japanese), Jay Hickman (English)

A man around the age of 30 who always wears a suit of armor with blue large shoulder pads. He also seems to have a considerate and kind personality towards others. Cloud is first shown when Hugh had gone to Kalb-Hu with Cloud and Despara. At this point, however, the characteristics of Cloud were unknown. Later on in the series, it is revealed that, like Dumas, Cloud is a Joker, or spy, for Templar. Cloud is sent to gather more knowledge about the country of Tusk, where he seems to hold a relationship with Roya's mother, Jesara. After Cloud assists in Roya's escape, Cloud later elaborated to Roya and Zed about the truth of Roya's past. After Cloud explains her past, they are attacked by a group of Tusker worshippers. Cloud flees with Roya while Zed holds the Tuskers at bay with Rambos and Amir Gaul. Later, Cloud explains to Roya that he will always protect her, as which is the will of her mother, Jesara.

Very soon after, however, Cloud is attacked by a rather angry Despara, whom he holds at bay for the second time. After Despara, who at the time became Jesara, is killed after being struck by Morocco's blade that had been intended for Roya, Morocco attempts to flee. Cloud however makes quick work of Morocco by delivering a fatal stab through his stomach, effectively killing him. After Roya and Zed return to Templar, Cloud sits by Jesara's side for the last time, because she had been sharing the same body with the now-dead Despara. Afterwards, Cloud returns to Tusk to continue his ways as a Joker.

== Kalb-Hu ==
Karubu Fū (カルブ・フー)

=== Guzman ===
Gusuma (グスマ) Voiced by: Ken Takeuchi (Japanese), Jonathan Novack (English)

The younger brother of the leader of the Kalb-Hu. He was imprisoned in the "dark training grounds" and forced to fight Zed for survival. Rebecca and her party interrupted, allowing and assisting both to escape. Like everyone in the training grounds, Guzman was also forced to undergo harsh training. If he didn't comply, his loved one would have been killed. After Zymot attacks the underground homeland of the Kalb-Hu, Guzman opposes, giving into Zymot's demands and assists Rebecca with fighting Hugh.

When Kalb-Hu was no longer in danger, Guzman lived happily with his wife and new born baby, whom they named Rebecca, after the late Princess Rebecca.

== Ulvarx ==
Urubākusu (ウルバークス)

=== Ginga ===
Ginga (ギンガ) Voiced by: Daisuke Sakaguchi (Japanese); Illich Guardiola (English)

A mysterious youth with the power to reverse Spirit summonings, however, Key Spirits are only able to be temporarily paralyzed. He is first seen in Tusk, where he rescues Roya from the Beast Humans, and later helps Zed stop her execution after she breaks the "Absolute Law" during the Neotopian Joust. He counsels Herrick against using the composite Spirit Ex-Machina to kill Hairam, but fails to stop Herrick. After Herrick is killed by Ex-Machina, he leaves Neotopia with Herrick's body.

Later when Ulvarx is under attack by Tusk he asks Zed and Roya for help. There, he goes after Dukeham, to take his revenge. It is stated that the girl whom he loved was killed by the soldiers from Neotopia and not by Dukeham. Dukeham leaves him and goes back to the central lab. Ginga is left behind while being stunned by this news. As the island explodes, it is hinted that he has died. You see his mechanic shoulder drifting in the sea with no body attached.

In the last episode, it shows that Ginga survived and used the completed Ex-Machina, though it was easily defeated by Tusker. After Tusker was defeated, Ginga went back to rebuild Ulvarx.

=== Herrick ===
Herikku (ヘリック) Voiced by: Shinnosuke Tachibana (Japanese); Adam Van Wagoner (English)

A former contender of the Neotopian Joust tournament. He attempts to recruit Zed to fight against Hairam, the supreme judge of Neotopia that oversees the "Ultimate Rules". After this is unsuccessful, he ignores Professor Bender's advice and takes the composite Spirit Ex-Machina, thinking that he can finally kill Hairam with it. He is killed while trying to stop Ex-Machina, which he can no longer control, after defeating Kira and discovering that she is his sister Chelsea.

=== Professor Bender ===
Wender (ヴェンダー) Voiced by: Kinryū Arimoto

Professor Bender appears to be the leader of the Ulbacus. He is involved with the creation of the composite Spirit Ex-Machina,"a Spirit that can beat all other Spirits", but feels that it is not yet complete. His ultimate goal is to take over and control every Spirit there is, as well as merge them into a more powerful Spirit; Ex-machina was supposed to be the result of this. All he cares for is his research. While being the leader of the Ulbacus, he switched over to Tusk, as they want to use his technology to capture Amil Gaoul. When he used his ultimate system on Amil Gaoul, he found out that the system was not enough to work on Amil Gaoul. Amil Gaoul goes on destroying the central lab. It is unknown if he has died when the island collapsed.

== Seekers ==
=== Sara ===
Sara (サラ) Voiced by: Kikuko Inoue (Japanese); Shelley Calene-Black (English)

Sara is first shown when Zed goes to Calm Hospital after taking Noah to be treated. He shows her a certain feathered pendulum that Noah had given him. She stares at the pendulum in a rather strange display of surprise. After Zed is later attacked by a teacher of Calm, who was actually a member of Tusk, Sara personally battles it out with him. This reveals that Sara herself is a Shard Caster and possesses a sense of duty to protect her son, or at least to get rid of this Tusk member. Most of this battle is not really shown because she never releases any Spirit, but instead continuously threw fire shards. Though, Sara is later shown holding the body of this Tusk member, in which it can be assumed he is dead. After this, she appeared several times, showing up in strange places, watching as events unfolded.

It is later revealed that she is a member of the Seekers, and was given a mission to find and bring Sagiri to the Seeker's flying fortress. During the siege of Neotopia, Sara appears to Diana and Noah in the catacombs below Hairam's temple, wielding the newly discovered key Spirit, Monadi. She uses the Spirit to battle Diana and in the end captures Sagiri. Before departing, she witnesses the death of Hugh at her son's hands and takes Pronimo's shard after it leaves Hugh's body. Sara was present at the destruction of Ulvarx.

After Sagiri escaped from the Seekers, Sara was sent to recover her in Templar. There she was reunited with Zico, whom Sara had an obvious hatred for. It was later revealed that Sara was originally from Calm, but had been kidnapped and brought to Templar by Zico, who believed that Sara was the chosen one of Amil Gaoul. Sara received Amil Gaoul's shard becoming a Shard Caster in the process. She then endured harsh training from Zico in order to one day wield the powerful Spirit. During the Zymot invasion, Sara tried to call Amil Gaoul prematurely, and even though the Spirit appeared, he turned and abandoned Sara. Shortly afterwards, Zico had turned his back on Sara and made her go back to Calm despite her pleas for another chance. It appears that Sara had experienced a moment of extreme ecstasy when Amil Gaoul first entered her body, and she longed to experience that sensation again. As a result, Sara has been living with constant 'withdrawal'-like feelings ever since. Her ultimate motive in all her actions was not to help the Seekers, but to gain the other key Spirits, in order to gain the power to control Amil Gaoul.

To further exemplify her obsession, Sara has developed a means of draining other Shard Caster's energy directly into her own body through multiple leech-like appendages that can be extended from her summoning crystal on her neck. It is this energy that allows her to wield the Key Spirit, Monadi, but only for short periods of time. Sara both loves and despises her son, Zed, because it was revealed that he had always been the chosen one of Amil Gaoul, and Sara has stated that if Zed were to die, she could regain the Spirit.

Sara confronted Zed and as they prepared to fight, Xeem and his soldiers appeared. He incapacitates Sara and takes her two key Spirits. At that moment, the Seeker fortress appears and Xeem flees. In the confusion, Sara also flees. She is not seen again until she tracks Zed to Tusk. Shortly afterwards, Zico and Roya appear looking for Zed. Sara tries to drain Roya's power, but is stopped by Zico. Sara is so weak at this point that she can't even cast a spell shard. Zico tells her that in this state, wielding Amil Gaoul would kill her. Sara states that as long as she can feel that 'ecstasy' again, she doesn't care.

Later, Sara appears before Zed and leads him to a small cave. As they walk, she asks Zed how old he is now, saying that she has missed so much of his growing up. She asks if he is hungry and that she can cook something for him. Zed is, at first, suspicious, but relents and allows her to cook for him. However, this is just a ruse to allow her to get the key Spirit, as she poisons the soup that she is preparing. However, Sara's mental state has deteriorated so much that she doesn't realize that she is speaking all her thoughts aloud and that Zed can hear her. Still she tries to give him the poisoned soup, which he angrily slaps away and tries to leave. She collapses and reaches out and grabs his arm begging for Amil Gaoul. Zed is so disgusted by this that he gives her the key Spirit.

Sara runs off happily and absorbs the key Spirit. Zico soon arrives and demands Amil Gaoul back, but Sara summons the Spirit and fights him, but Amil Gaoul is too powerful and Zico is defeated. As she stands triumphant, she suddenly grabs her head and screams. Inside her mind, she floats in a golden-colored void, but is suddenly surrounded by black feathers, turning the void black. She reaches out for the key Spirit shard floating in front of her and grabs it. Sara says that with the shard she can protect that which is most precious to her. However, she suddenly realizes that she can't remember what it was that was so precious to her. Begging the key Spirit to tell her, the shard flies up and creates a round opening where a bright light streams through.

From the light, Sara hears the faint laugh of an infant. As she peers into the light, she sees her younger self holding her baby, Zed, in her arms, as he laughs and holds her finger. Sara finally remembers what was most precious to her, the one thing that drove away the darkness in her life and gave her a reason to live... her son, Zed. Tears streaming down her face, she laments how she could have forgotten. Reawakening in Roya's arms, she gives Roya the key shard and whispers some words into her ear before dying. Her last words were,"My precious Zed... Thank you."

=== Sagiri ===
Sagiri (サギリ) Voiced by: Aya Endo (Japanese); Hilary Haag (English)

Sagiri is a little girl introduced in episode 5. She belongs to a group of nomads that were carrying with them the Key Spirit, Sachura. One day, while she was wandering through a forest with a nomad named Galba, she found Noah collapsed against a tree. Sagiri and Galba brought Noah to a place where he could recover. After nursing Noah back to health, she befriends him. When Noah obtained Sachura, all of the Nomads were killed except her. With nowhere else to go, she is taken by Noah to Neotopia.

During the war which led to Neotopia's downfall, she was kidnapped by Sara and was reunited with the Seekers. She learned that she is a descendant of a royal bloodline of Seekers, who were born in a place called Rion. At some point in time, Zymot invaded Rion. In order to keep Sagiri safe, she was entrusted to Galba, who raised her. Sagiri received the Key Spirit Shadin and is the Seekers "Savior", but in episode 46, she entrusts Shadin to Zed, in return for requesting that he find and protect Noah. She is last seen living on the Seeker's flying ship.
