= Grand Knights History =

2011 role-playing video game

- Developer: Vanillaware
- Publisher: Marvelous Entertainment
- Director: Tomohiko Deguchi
- Producer: Yoshifumi Hashimoto
- Artist: Kouichi Maenou
- Composers: Mitsuhiro Kaneda; Yoshimi Kudo; Noriyuki Kamikura; Masaharu Iwata
- Platform: PlayStation Portable
- Release: JP: September 1, 2011
- Genre: Tactical role-playing
- Modes: Single-player, multiplayer

Grand Knights History (Note: Guran Naitsu Hisutorī (Japanese: グランナイツヒストリー)) is a 2011 tactical role-playing video game developed by Vanillaware and published by Marvelous Entertainment for the PlayStation Portable. Following the adventures of a mercenary group in the employ of one of three warring nations, the player engages in turn-based combat while navigating maps. The game originally featured online competitive multiplayer where chosen teams of characters fight for their nation, but this ended when servers shut down in October 2013.

Production began in 2009 following the release of Muramasa: The Demon Blade; Muramasa publisher Marvelous wanted to work with Vanillaware on a PSP title. The game was directed by Tomohiko Deguchi, and GrimGrimoire artist Kouichi Maenou designed the characters. The aim was to blend Vanillaware's artistic style with a turn-based battle system and online multiplayer, both firsts for the company. Music was handled by a team from Basiscape, a frequent collaborator with Vanillaware.

The game was released to strong sales, making a significant contribution to Marvelous's fiscal profits. It also met with positive reviews from critics. Due to Vanillaware focusing on developing Dragon's Crown, a planned localization from Xseed Games and Rising Star Games was cancelled. After leaving Vanillaware, Deguchi used his concepts from Grand Knights History to develop the 2014 video game Grand Kingdom.

== Gameplay ==
A battle scene from Grand Knights History

Grand Knights History is a role-playing video game where players take on the role of the player-named leader of a mercenary knight squad in service to one of three kingdoms of the continent of Rystia. Players begin by selecting which nation to support, and are then introduced to the narrative. The player takes control of a group of up to four customised characters from three separate character classes—knight, archer, or wizard—who must travel on missions either for their nation or related to the main narrative. The story is advanced by taking part in quests which require the player to travel across the game world on a map with interconnected areas and towns. As players complete more quests, paths to new areas become available to explore. During exploration, the player party is represented as a chess piece on a large board. Each mission has a limited number of moves, with different spaces housing events, items, or battles.

Battle sequences take place on convex grid-based fighting area known as the "Battle Sphere Reel", which the game's camera pans across when party members or enemies take action. Combat uses a turn-based battle system. At the beginning of each turn, the player selects a character's actions; these include standard attacks, special skills, and healing spells or items. Each move or action uses a portion of the party's Action Point (AP) metre, which is replenished by a set amount each turn or when an enemy is defeated. Using particular skills or weapons repeatedly unlocks new skills for a character. By outfitting characters in new weapons, armor, and ornaments, a player may increase a character's statistics which allow them to become stronger, as well as further impact their appearance. Completing battles rewards experience points which raise the party's attributes, and currency used to buy items or equipment in towns and at the group's base. If a unit of the player is killed, it will be removed from the rest of the battle, receiving half the EXP and returning with 1 HP after the battle. If the entire party is defeated, the game ends.

Making use of the PlayStation Portable's PlayStation Network online function, players could battle each other in groups representing one of the game's three kingdoms. As each group won battles against opposing factions, they expanded their territory within the online environment, granting them access to rewards and a standing on community-based leaderboards. Winning groups could vote on which territory to attack next, and individual players could opt to have their characters controlled by artificial intelligence rather than themselves manually. The servers were shut down on October 31, 2013.

== Synopsis ==
Grand Knights History is set in the fantasy world of Rystia, which is divided into three warring kingdoms: Logres, the Ancient Kingdom, ruled by King Fausel; Union, the Kingdom of Knights, ruled by King Leon; and Avalon, the Kingdom of Magic, ruled by Queen Muse. The player is the head of a newly-formed group of knights, who allies with one of the warring nations. Upon their employment, the mercenaries are assigned the young assistant Liscia, who aids them on their campaigns for the chosen nation. During their campaigns, the group collect relics known as the Saint's Treasures; cross paths with the witch Mira; and a band commanded by the Masked Knight, who knows Liscia and attempts to take her into hiding against her will. During one mission to rescue Bishop Noyce of Rystia's Saint's Church, an ancient demon called the King of Chaos begins breaking free of its prison. Noyce, recognising Liscia as Lorendina, last descendant of a mythical hero called the Saint, plans to kill her before she can be used as a sacrifice to empower the King of Chaos. The Masked Knight, named Cerueila, was her assigned protector.

The mercenaries defend Liscia from the Church, then from the plans of the Clan of Chaos and their fortune teller ally Stola, who use the search for the Saint's Treasures to weaken seals they were maintaining, and manipulated the Church into destroying the Saint's bloodline. Liscia can embody the Saint and seal the King of Chaos again, but doing so will kill her. The mercenaries, escorting Liscia and the allied Mira, and followed by Cerueila, defeat the Church's forces and demons to reach where the heart of the King of Chaos remains. Cerueila sacrifices herself while protecting Liscia, and to save Liscia the mercenary leader interrupts the ritual. Fulfilling her one vision of a happy future, Stola takes Liscia's place in the ritual. Later Liscia arranges to return to her original place with the mercenaries, and they continue their campaigns against neighbouring nations.

== Development ==
Production on Grand Knights History began in 2009 and lasted around two years. Following the release by Marvelous Entertainment of Muramasa: The Demon Blade in 2009, producer Yoshifumi Hashimoto contacted Vanillaware about working on a new title together, after hearing Vanillaware's Tomohiko Deguchi wanted to develop for the PSP. The game was Vanillaware's first turn-based RPG, with Deguchi aiming for a war-based RPG that would "connect everyone". Deguchi, acting as the game's director, created the concept for Grand Knights History from his wish to do something new. This concept allowed him to express his wish to use the PSP's wireless communication functions for something unusual. He drew inspiration from his love of tabletop and board games, and video game series including Disgaea.

The game's art director was Kouichi Maenou, who had worked as character designer for GrimGrimoire, an earlier title from Vanillaware. The game was Maenou's first time working as art director. After trial and error, he decided to emulate classic Western fantasy art similar to previous Vanillaware titles, using a style of defined lines and soft colours for characters and backgrounds. He also incorporated blank areas around the edges of displays, as if players were looking at a book illustration. As with other Vanillaware titles, Grand Knights Kingdom made use of 2D graphics, but while this style was preserved it was adapted to turn-based role-playing, departing greatly from the company's previous action-based titles. The character animation used the same techniques as earlier Vanillaware titles.

When choosing the PSP for the platform, the team wanted to distinguish the game from other titles on the platform, many of which had multiplayer elements. Hashimoto described the multiplayer elements as a cross between online game structure and email communication. As players could not be online all the time, the team designed a system that would keep parties synchronised on the server. During production, Hashimoto consulted with the PSP's manufacturer Sony about its online elements, referring to them as "understanding" of the development process.

The music for Grand Knights History was composed by a team from Basiscape, a music company founded by Hitoshi Sakimoto who collaborated with Vanillaware since the company's 2007 debut Odin Sphere. The team consisted of lead composer Mitsuhiro Kaneda, and secondary composers Yoshimi Kudo, Noriyuki Kamikura and Masaharu Iwata. The game was described by Kaneda as an odd RPG to work on. A rock music style was requested for the battle themes, something he was not good at, so the final soundtrack ended up mixing rock and orchestral elements together. A soundtrack album was released in 2011, and was positively received by music critics. The album later saw a worldwide release on streaming services in June 2025.

Grand Knights History was revealed in late March 2009. At the time of its announcement, the game was 70% complete. It was released in Japan on September 1, 2011. It was promoted with a commercial featuring the single "Navigation", performed by J-pop artist Fumika. The game was originally planned for a Western release through Xseed Games (North America) and Rising Star Games (Europe). Due to their work on Dragon's Crown, Vanillaware was unable to dedicate any resources to help Xseed Games with the localization, eventually forcing them to cancel it despite the translation being almost complete. Due to Xseed's decision, Rising Star Games also cancelled the European version. An English fan translation was released in 2014. Deguchi would eventually leave Vanillaware and found Monochrome Corporation. There he developed Grand Kingdom, which drew inspiration from both Grand Knights History and other Vanillaware titles.

== Reception ==
Reception

Review scores
Publication	Score
Famitsu	36/40
Dengeki PlayStation	82.5

During its week of release, Grand Knights History reached the top of gaming charts as recorded by Media Create, with debut sales of over 64,600 units. It sold through over 90% of its stock. By the end of September, it had sold over 110,000 units. In their fiscal year report, Marvelous Entertainment cited Grand Knights History as a factor in strong financial gains during 2011.

Grand Knights History earned the Platinum Award from Japanese magazine Famitsu Weekly. The magazine praised the title's "traditionally-Vanillaware graphics" and character animations as well as its online mode. It also garnered a positive review from the magazine Dengeki PlayStation. In a list of Japanese-exclusive PSP titles, Game Informer noted the general excitement for the game following its announcement.
