= Aya Hisakawa =

Japanese voice actress (born 1968)

- 久川 綾
- Born: November 12, 1968 (age 57); Kaizuka, Osaka, Japan
- Occupations: Voice actress; singer
- Years active: 1988–present
- Agent: Aoni Production
- Notable work: Bleach as Retsu Unohana; Trapp Family Story as Rafaela; Sailor Moon as Sailor Mercury; Ah! My Goddess as Skuld; Cardcaptor Sakura as Kero; Detective Conan as various voices; HeartCatch Pretty Cure! as Yuri Tsukikage/Cure Moonlight; Dragon Ball as Bulma; Bakuten Shoot Beyblade as Rei Kon; Tenjho Tenge as Maya Natsume; Kid Icarus: Uprising as Palutena; The Twelve Kingdoms as Yōko Nakajima
- Height: 159 cm (5 ft 3 in)
- Musical career
- Genres: J-pop; anime song
- Instrument: Vocals
- Years active: 1993–present

Aya Hisakawa (久川 綾, Hisakawa Aya; born November 12, 1968) is a Japanese voice actress and singer. In addition to releasing various solo CDs, Hisakawa is well known for her voice roles in anime and video games. Some of her major roles are Retsu Unohana in Bleach, Rafaela in Trapp Family Story, Sailor Mercury in Sailor Moon, Skuld in Oh My Goddess!, Miki Kaoru in Revolutionary Girl Utena, Yuri Tsukikage/Cure Moonlight in HeartCatch Pretty Cure!, Kero in Cardcaptor Sakura, Haruko Kamio in Air, Kaoru Sayama in the Yakuza Series since Kiwami 2, Michie Matsumoto in Sound! Euphonium Yōko Nakajima in The Twelve Kingdoms. She performs some of her roles in her native Kansai-ben. She is affiliated with Aoni Production. On February 14, 2018, she was announced as the new voice of Bulma in the Dragon Ball series, replacing original voice actress Hiromi Tsuru, who had held the role from the original anime's debut in 1986 to her death in 2017.

== Filmography ==
=== Anime ===
List of voice performances in anime
Year	Title	Role	Notes	Source
1987	Kiteretsu Daihyakka	Taeko Sakurai	Third generation	
1989	Transformers: Victory	Boater, Joyce		
1989	Madö King Granzört	Mimi		
1989	Shin Bikkuriman	Pucchi Orin, Orin Princess		
1989	Dragon Ball Z	Chiko	Ep. 16	
1989	Sally the Witch	Sumire Kasugano	2nd TV series	
1990	Chibi Maruko-chan	Yacht-chan's wife	2nd	
1990	Mōretsu Atarō	Momoko	2nd TV series	
1990	RPG Densetsu Hepoi ja:RPG伝説ヘポイ	Miya Miya		
1990	Mahjong battle scramble turmoil war da Mahjong	Yuki	OVA	
1990–95	Devil Hunter Yohko	Yohko Mano, others	OVA series	
1991	Trapp Family Story	Rafaela		
1991	Chiisana Obake Acchi, Kocchi, Socchi	Akane		
1991	Dragon Quest: Dai no Daibōken	Leona		
1991	Ask Ultraman Kids Mother 30 million light-years ja:ウルトラマンキッズ 母をたずねて3000万光年	Primer		
1992	The Bush Baby	Doris		
1992–93	Sailor Moon	Ami Mizuno / Sailor Mercury		
1992	Crayon Shin-chan	Various characters		
1992	Maboroshima-chan	Parlu		
1993	Oh My Goddess!	Skuld	OVA	
1993	Sailor Moon R	Ami Mizuno / Sailor Mercury		
1993	Nintama Rantaro	Maple		
1994	Marmalade Boy	Arimi Suzuki		
1994	Sailor Moon S	Ami Mizuno / Sailor Mercury		
1994	Mobile Fighter G Gundam	Akino		
1994	Tenshi Nanka Ja Nai	Midori Saejima	OVA	
1994	Magic Knight Rayearth	Tarta		
1994	Phantom Quest Corp.	Natsuke Ogawa	OVA series	
1994	801 T.T.S. Airbats	Miyuki Haneda		
1995	Sailor Moon SuperS	Ami Mizuno / Sailor Mercury		
1995	World Fairy Tale Series	Beauty / Morgiana		
1996	Sailor Moon Sailor Stars	Ami Mizuno / Sailor Mercury		
1996	Detective Conan	Ako Amari, Masayo Aoshima, Kaori Kitasaka, Mika Ooga, Misato Tsutumi, Shizuku Tateishi, Saki Nijimura		
1996	Lupin III: The Secret of Twilight Gemini	Lara		
1997	Eat-Man	Kyrene Garbo	Ep. 1	
1997	Revolutionary Girl Utena	Miki Kaoru		
1997	Kindaichi Case Files	Yuri Tsuji		
1997	Battle Athletes Victory	Ichino Yanagida		
1997	Anime Ganbare Goemon	Yae		
1997	Voogie's Angel	Voogie	OVA series	
1998	All Purpose Cultural Cat Girl Nuku Nuku	Arisa Sono		
1998	Power Dolls Project α ja:POWER DoLLS プロジェクトα	Hardy Newland	OVA 2nd version	
1998	Trigun	Rem Saverem		
1998	The Adventures of Mini-Goddess	Skuld		
1998	Cardcaptor Sakura	Cerberus		
1998	DT Eightron	Judy	Ep. 21	
1998	Gasaraki	Caster		
1998	Geobreeders: Get Back the Kitty	Maki Umezaki	OVA series	
1999	To Heart	Tomoko Hoshina		
1999	Kaikan Phrase	Female customer, others		
1999	Karakurizōshi Ayatsuri Sakon	Hoshie Nishimura		
1999	Weekly Storyland ja:週刊ストーリーランド	Akane Sato, Religion Group (Woman), Takako, Yuki Machida		
2000	Shinzo	Binka		
2000	Love Hina	Amalla Su		
2001	Beyblade	Rei Kon		
2001	Earth Maiden Arjuna	Sayuri Shirakawa		
2001	Noir	Chloe		
2001	Project ARMS	Alice		
2001–02	Alien Nine	Megumi Hisakawa	OVA series	
2001	Fruits Basket	Yuki Sohma		
2001	Magical Nyan Nyan Taruto	Chips, Chiffon		
2001	Cosmo Warrior Zero	Marina Oki		
2001	X	Hinoto		
2002	Beyblade V-Force	Rei Kon, Keiko-sensei		
2002	RahXephon	Haruka Shitou		
2002	Tenchi Muyo! GXP	Ryoko Balta		
2002	Magical Shopping Arcade Abenobashi	Mune-Mune		
2002	Azumanga Daioh	Minamo "Nyamo" Kurosawa		
2002	The Twelve Kingdoms	Youko Nakajima		
2002	G-On Riders	Mio Sanada		
2002	Hanada Shōnen Shi	Yuki		
2002	Haibane Renmei	Kuramori		
2002	Kiddy Grade	Foxy Fox		
2003	Beyblade G-Revolution	Rei Kon		
2003	Anime Classical Literature Museum Volume 1 "Taketori Monogatari" :ja:アニメ古典文学館 第1巻「竹取物語」	Kaguya Hime	OVA	
2003–05	Kaleido Star	Sarah Dupont	2 seasons + OVAs	
2003	Ninja Scroll: The Series	Azami	Ep. 4	
2003	Detective School Q	Shino Katagiri		
2003–04	Godannar	Mira Ackerman	2 seasons	
2003	Rockman.EXE Axess	Igarashi Ran		
2004	SD Gundam Force	Keiko		
2004	Monkey Turn	Ryouko Seiji		
2004	Tenjho Tenge	Maya Natsume		
2004	Madlax	Rimelda		
2004	Melody of Oblivion	Miri Kanaya		
2004	Ragnarok the Animation	Takius		
2004	Beet the Vandel Buster	Kiss		
2004	Magical Girl Lyrical Nanoha	Lindy Harlaown		
2004	To Heart: Remember My Memories	Tomoko Hoshina		
2004	Haruka: Beyond the Stream of Time	Seri		
2005	Bleach	Retsu Unohana		
2005	Girls Bravo	Hijiri Kanata	season 2	
2005	Air	Haruko Kamio		
2005–07	Ah! My Goddess	Skuld	2 seasons + OVA	
2005	Kaiketsu Zorori	Ruby		
2005	Best Student Council	Chieri Rando		
2005	Eureka Seven	Ray Beams		
2005	My shelter ja:ぼくの防空壕	Yasuko Kasamatsu		
2005	Magical Girl Lyrical Nanoha A's	Lindy Harlaown		
2005	Gunparade Orchestra	Miyako Tokyo		
2005	Beet the Vandel Buster	Kiss		
2005	Chibi Vampire	Fumio Usui		
2006	Fushigiboshi no Futagohime Gyu!	Black School Director, White School Director		
2006	Zegapain	Arque		
2006	Yume Tsukai	Misako Mishima		
2006	Black Jack 21	Yuri		
2006	Tsubasa: Reservoir Chronicle	Keroberos	season 2	
2006	Binbō Shimai Monogatari	Mother, Keiko Yamada		
2006	Demashita! Powerpuff Girls Z	Mrs. Akatsutsumi		
2006	Government Crime Investigation Agent Zaizen Jotaro	Minako Ayano		
2006	Fist of the Blue Sky	Pān Yù-Líng, Aya Kitaoji		
2006	Gin'iro no Olynssis	Serena		
2006	Kenichi: The Mightiest Disciple	Chihiro Takashima		
2006	Ghost Slayers Ayashi	Tae		
2007	Gakuen Utopia Manabi Straight!	Kyōko Kibukawa		
2007	GeGeGe no Kitaro	Aria Puresutain, others	5th TV series	
2007	El Cazador de la Bruja	Jody "Blue-Eyes" Hayward		
2007	Over Drive	Mikoto's mother		
2007	Claymore	Priscilla		
2007	Romeo × Juliet	Portia		
2007	Emily of New Moon	Aileen Kent		
2007	Princess Resurrection	Witch		
2007	Devil May Cry: The Animated Series	Nina Rowell		
2007	Potemayo	Kira Kasugano		
2007	Night Wizard The ANIMATION	RaRA Mu		
2007	Neuro: Supernatural Detective	Yoshino Kuro		
2007	MapleStory	Lupan		
2008	Rosario and Vampire	Ririko Kagome	2 seasons	
2008	One Piece	Charlotte Lola, Charlotte Chiffon		
2008	To Love-Ru	Space monster		
2008	Our Home's Fox Deity.	Aya		
2008	Himitsu - Top Secret	Ruriko Aoki		
2008	Golgo 13	Cecilia		
2008	Sands of Destruction	Morte's mother		
2008–12	Nogizaka Haruka no Himitsu series	Akiho Nogizaka		
2008	Hell Girl	Mitsuko Yamaoka	season 3	
2008	Mōryō no Hako	Yoko Yuzuki		
2008	Asagaro of Negiblob ja:ねぎぼうずのあさたろう	Ashitaro's mother / Otama		
2009	Kurokami: The Animation	Kuro's mother		
2009	Phantom: Requiem for the Phantom	Claudia McCunnen		
2009	Pandora Hearts	Kate		
2009	Kon'nichiwa Anne: Before Green Gables	Louisa		
2009	Taishō Baseball Girls	Yae Suzukawa		
2009	Tegami Bachi	Anne Seeing	Also Reverse in 2010	
2009	Anyamaru Tantei Kiruminzuu	Miyuki Nanase		
2009	Aoi Bungaku	Shizuko		
2010	HeartCatch PreCure!	Yuri Tsukikage / Cure Moonlight		
2010	Occult Academy	Fumiaki's mother		
2011	Gosick	Coco Rose		
2011	X-Men	Storm/Ororo Munroe		
2011	Sket Dance	Various characters	Dodon Dondondon's Wife / Dodon Dondondon's Child / Miko's Mother	
2011	Jewelpet Sunshine	Kanon's Mama		
2011	Penguindrum	Mother of many mothers		
2011	Chihayafuru	Rieko Oe		
2011	Future Diary	Hinata's mother		
2012	Ano Natsu de Matteru	Nanami Kirishima		
2012	Saint Seiya Ω	Sonia		
2012	Zetman	Youko Amagi		
2012	Gon	Taupo		
2012	Ginga e Kickoff!!	Saionji Temple		
2012	Saku: Achiga-hen episode of side A	Mori Atago		
2012	Nyaruko: Crawling with Love	Yoriko Yasaka	also W in 2013 and F in 2015	
2012	Nakaimo - My Sister Is Among Them!	Kanoko Mikadono		
2012	So, I Can't Play H!	Almeia Restall		
2012	Jormungand: Perfect Order	Hex		
2013	Chihayafuru 2	Rieko Oe		
2013	Space Battleship Yamato 2199	Kaoru Niimi		
2013	Day Break Illusion	Hinata Taiyo		
2013	Futari wa Milky Holmes	Ryoko Komatsu		
2013	Kyōsōgiga	Lady Koto		
2013	Magi: The Kingdom of Magic	Aum Madaura		
2013	Tokyo Ravens	Ako Kifu		
2014	Robot Girls Z	Baron Ashura		
2014	Space Dandy	Capybarian	season 2	
2014	Blue Spring Ride	Hikari's mother		
2014	Encouragement of Climb	Megumi Yukimura	season 2	
2014	Tokyo ESP	Tozai Ryo		
2014	JoJo's Bizarre Adventure: Stardust Crusaders	Midler		
2014	Wolf Girl and Black Prince	Hitomi Sata		
2015	Minna Atsumare! Falcom Gakuen	Arianrhod		
2015	Shōnen Hollywood -Holly Stage for 49-	Kiyomi Maiyama		
2015	The Rolling Girls	Kukushino		
2015	Ghost in the Shell: Arise – Alternative Architecture	Jingji · Becca · Al · Saeed		
2015–24	Sound! Euphonium	Michie Matsumoto	3 seasons	
2015	Triage X	Fiona Ran Winchester		
2015	Gintama°	Mr. Atsuritsu		
2015	Shokugeki no Soma	Kinu Nakamozu	Season 1 Episode 17: Sensual Karaage	
2015	Fang Wolf – Red Guren Nozuki -	Kazuki Hime		
2016	Myriad Colors Phantom World	Reina's mother		
2016	Aikatsu Stars!	Keiko Nijino		
2016	Puzzle & Dragons X	Rena		
2016	WWW.Working!!	Sachiko Higashida		
2017	Akiba's Trip: The Animation	Lawrie Barbara		
2017	Scum's Wish	Hanabi's mother		
2017	BanG Dream!	Nonoe Hanazono		
2018	Cardcaptor Sakura: Clear Card	Cerberus		
2018	Dragon Ball Super	Bulma		
2020	Our Last Crusade or the Rise of a New World	Millavair Lou Nebulis VIII		
2021	Cute Executive Officer	Garcia's Mother		
2021	Kemono Jihen	Kumi		
2022	Requiem of the Rose King	Cecily Neville		
2022	Don't Hurt Me, My Healer!	Witch		
2022	Bleach: Thousand Year Blood War	Retsu Unohana		
2023	Heavenly Delusion	Mina		
2023	Dark Gathering	Nagiko Shami; Namiko Shami		
2026	Hikuidori	Akiyo		
2026	The Ghost in the Shell	Annapuma		

=== Films ===
List of voice performances in film
Year	Title	Role	Notes	Source
1986	Super Mario Bros.: The Great Mission to Rescue Princess Peach!	Toadbelle		
1990	CAROL	Carol Mudagolas		
1991	Dragon Quest: Dai no Daibōken: Great Adventure	Leona		
1992	21emon Soraike! Hadashi no Princess ja:21エモン 宇宙いけ！ 裸足のプリンセス	Princess Fana		
1992	Dragon Quest: Dai no Daibōken: Disciple of Avan	Princess Leona		
1993	Sangokushi (2) Chōkō Moyu! 三国志 第二部・長江燃ゆ！	Children singing voice 子供唄声		
1993	Sailor Moon R: The Movie	Ami Mizuno / Sailor Mercury	also related short	
1994	Sailor Moon S: The Movie	Ami Mizuno / Sailor Mercury		
1995	Sailor Moon SuperS: The Movie	Ami Mizuno / Super Sailor Mercury	also Ami's First Love short	
1998	MAZE★Bakunetsu Jikuu: Tenpen Kyoui no Giant	Jan Del		
1999	Pocket Monsters the Movie: Revelation Lugia	Yodel		
1999	Revolutionary Girl Utena: Adolescence of Utena	Miki Kaoru		
1999	Cardcaptor Sakura: The Movie	Keroberos		
2000	Cardcaptor Sakura Movie 2: The Sealed Card	Keroberos	also Leave it to Kero short	
2000	Ah! My Goddess: The Movie	Skuld		
2001	Detective Conan: Countdown to Heaven	Chinami Sawaguchi		
2002	Bakuten Shoot Beyblade The Movie: Gekitou!! Takao VS Daichi	Rei Kon		
2003	RahXephon: Pluralitas Concentio	Haruka Shitow		
2004	Detective Conan: Magician of the Silver Sky	Masayo Yaguchi 矢口真佐代		
2005	AIR: The Movie	Haruko Kamio		
2007	Bleach: The DiamondDust Rebellion	Retsu Unohana, Ying		
2008	Bleach: Fade to Black	Retsu Unohana		
2010	Magical Girl Lyrical Nanoha THE MOVIE 1st	Lindy Harlaown		
2010	HeartCatch Pretty Cure!: The Movie	Yuri Tsukikage / Cure Moonlight		
2011	Pretty Cure All Stars DX3: Deliver the Future! The Rainbow-Colored Flower That Connects the World	Yuri Tsukikage / Cure Moonlight		
2012	Pretty Cure All Stars New Stage: Friends of the Future	Yuri Tsukikage / Cure Moonlight		
2012	Magical Girl Lyrical Nanoha The MOVIE 2nd A's	Lindy Harlaown		
2014	Space Battleship Yamato 2199: Odyssey of the Celestial Ark	Kaoru Niimi		
2015	Pretty Cure All Stars: Carnival of Spring♪	Yuri Tsukikage / Cure Moonlight		
2016	Doraemon: Nobita and the Birth of Japan 2016	Time Patrol Captain		
2017	Magical Girl Lyrical Nanoha Reflection	Lindy Harlaown		
2018	Dragon Ball Super: Broly	Bulma		
2020	Love Me, Love Me Not			
2022	Dragon Ball Super: Super Hero	Bulma		

=== Video games ===
List of voice performances in video games
Year	Title	Role	Notes	Source
1990–93	Devil Hunter Yohko games	Yohko Mano		
1992–97	Graduation games ja:卒業 (ゲーム)	Jun Hiramoto? Shizuka Nakamoto?	Multiple platforms	
1994	Sailor Moon games	Ami Mizuno / Sailor Mercury		
1994	Megami Paradise	Pastel	PC Engine, also sequel in 1996	
1994	Power Dolls 2 ja:パワードール	Juan Kwan Mei ファン・クァンメイ	PS1/PS2; Marine Corps Oops Mother	
1994	Lunar: Eternal Blue	Gene	also Lunar 2 in 1998–99	
1996–97	True Love Story games	Tomoko Honda 本多智子	PS1/PS2	
1997	Tengai Makyō: Daiyon no Mokushiroku	Ann アン	Sega Saturn	
1997	Langrisser I & II	Jessica	PS1/PS2	
1997	YU-NO: A Girl Who Chants Love at the Bound of this World	Eriko Takeda	Sega Saturn; Adult	
1997	Oh My Goddess	Skuld	also Quiz in 2000, and 2007 game	
1997	Grandia	Mio	Sega Saturn/PS1	
1998	Battle Athletes: Alternative	Ikuno Yanagida 柳田一乃	PS1/PS2	
1998	Revolutionary Girl Utena: Story of the Someday Revolution	Miki Kaoru 薫幹	Sega Saturn	
1998	Grandia: Digital Museum	Mio	Sega Saturn	
1998	Star Ocean: The Second Story	Rena Lanford	PS1/PS2	
1999	Battle Athletes: GTO	Ikuno Yanagida 柳田一乃	PS1/PS2	
1999	To Heart	Tomoko Hoshina 保科智子	PS1/PS2, also PSE in 2003	
1999	Soulcalibur	Chai Xianghua	DC	
2001	Sega Gaga	Hayata Yayoi, Nurse, Mogetan 羽田弥生/看護婦/モゲタン	DC	
2002	Azumanga Daioh games	Minamo Kurosawa	PS2	
2002	Air	Haruko Kamio	PS2, also PSP in 2007, remake in 2016	
2003	Soulcalibur II	Chai Xianghua	Arcade, GameCube, PS2, Xbox	
2003	Summon Night 3	Aldira アルディラ	PS1/PS2; Melancer. The guardian of the machine world. HP with sample voice	
2004	Rozen Maiden	Sakurada Nori 桜田のり	Other	
2004	Monkey Turn V	Ryoko Seiji 世良涼子	PS1/PS2	
2005	Girls Bravo Romance 15's	Akira アキラ	PS1/PS2	
2005	Soulcalibur III	Chai Xianghua	PS2	
2006	JoJo's Bizarre Adventure: Phantom Blood	Erina Pendleton	PS2	
2007	Ace Combat 6: Fires of Liberation	Melissa Herman	Xbox 360	
2008	Nogizaka Haruka no Himitsu games	Akiho Nogizaka	PS2	
2009	Tales of Versus	Judith	PSP	
2009	Tales of Vesperia	Judith	PS3	
2011	Valkyria Chronicles III	Lydia Agute	PSP	
2011	Tales of the World: Radiant Mythology 3	Judith	PSP	
2011	The Legend of Heroes: Trails to Azure	Arianrhod	PSP, PC, PS Vita, PS4, Switch	
2012	Binary Domain	Faye Li	PS3, Xbox 360	
2012	Kid Icarus: Uprising	Palutena	3DS	
2014	Granblue Fantasy	Silva	iOS, Android, Web Browser	
2014	Super Smash Bros. for Nintendo 3DS & Wii U	Palutena	3DS, Wii U	
2014	Atelier Shallie: Alchemists of the Dusk Sea	Nady Elminus	PS3, also Plus version in PS Vita 2016	
2014	Dengeki Bunko: Fighting Climax	Kino	PS3, other. Also Ignition in 2015	
2016	Star Ocean: Anamnesis	Rena Lanford	iOS, Android, Web Browser	
2017	Yakuza Kiwami 2	Kaoru Sayama	PS4, PC	
2017	The Legend of Heroes: Trails of Cold Steel III	Arianrhod	PS4, Switch, PC	
2018	Super Smash Bros. Ultimate	Palutena	Switch	
2018	The Legend of Heroes: Trails of Cold Steel IV	Arianrhod	PS4, Switch, PC	
2019	Another Eden	Cerrine	iOS/Android	
2020	Dragon Ball Z: Kakarot	Bulma, Trunks (Baby)	PC, PS4, Xbox One	
2022	Arknights	Kjera	iOS, Android	
2023	Star Ocean: The Second Story R	Rena Lanford	PC, PS4, PS5, Switch	
2024	Like a Dragon: Infinite Wealth	Kaoru Sayama	PC, PS4, PS5, Xbox One, Xbox Series X/S	
2024	Dragon Ball: Sparking! Zero	Bulma	PC, PS5, Xbox Series X/S	

=== Tokusatsu ===
List of voice performances in tokusatsu
Year	Title	Role	Notes	Source
2014–15	Ressha Sentai ToQger	Madame Noir	Eps. 1 – 3, 5 – 15, 17, 19 – 25, 27 – 36, 38 – 41	
2014	Ressha Sentai ToQger the Movie: Galaxy Line S.O.S.	Madame Noir	Movie	
2015	Ressha Sentai ToQger vs. Kyoryuger: The Movie	Madame Noir	Movie	
2015	They Went and Came Back Again Ressha Sentai ToQGer: Super ToQ 7gou of Dreams	Madame Noir	OV	
2016	Shuriken Sentai Ninninger vs. ToQger the Movie: Ninja in Wonderland	Mochizuki Noir Chiyome	Movie	

=== Other dubbing ===
List of voice performances in other dubs
Year	Title	Role	Notes	Source
1992	Goof Troop	Rose Beckenbloom		
1992	The Little Mermaid (TV series)	Attina		
1994	Léon: The Professional	Mathilda Lando		
1994	Aladdin (animated TV series)	Saleen		
1993	Jason Goes to Hell: The Final Friday	Jessica Kimble		
1993	Ultraman: The Ultimate Hero	Julie Young		
1995	The NeverEnding Story III	Nicole Baxter		
1999	101 Dalmatians: The Series	Anita Radcliffe		
1999	Calla	Yoon Soo-jin		
2000	The in Crowd	Brittany Foster		
2001	Snow White: The Fairest of Them All	Snow White		
2005	Star Wars: Droids	Auren Yomm Baobab		
2015	Star vs. the Forces of Evil	Moon Butterfly		
2016	Wayward Pines	Rebecca Yedlin		

=== Drama CDs ===
List of voice performances in drama CDs and audio recordings
Year	Title	Role	Notes	Source
1994	Dragon Quest V	Maria	2 volumes	
1996	Dragon Quest VI	Mirielle	2 volumes	
1997	Power Dolls Wedding March	Hardy Newland		
2002	Kino's Journey: The Beautiful World	Kino		
2002	Nanaka 6/17	Yuriko Amemiya	3 volumes	
2004	Fullmetal Alchemist	Monica		
	Oh My Goddess	Skuld		
	Sailor Moon	Ami Mizuno / Sailor Mercury		
	Cardcaptor Sakura	Keroberos		
	Fruits Basket	Yuki Sohma		
	G-On Riders	Mio Sanada		
	Godannar	Mira Ackerman		
	Gunsmith Cats	Becky Farrar		
	Idol Project	Layla B. Simmons		
	Devil Hunter Yohko	Yohko		
	Marmalade Boy	Arimi Suzuki		
	Kekkon Marriage	Shizuka Nakamoto		
	Nanaka 6/17	Yuriko Amemiya		
	Nogizaka Haruka no Himitsu	Akiho Nogizawa		
	Ragnarok the Animation	Takius		
	Shining Force EXA	Mabel		
	Sotsugyou (Graduation)	Shizuka Nakamoto		
	Tokimeki Memorial	Natsue Marikawa		
	True Love Story	Tomoko Honda		
	Vampire Hunter	Lei Lei		

== Discography ==
=== Albums ===
- Kyasha
- Aya~Toki wo Tsumuide~
- Fantasy
- Hi-Ka-Ri
- for you for me
- MARCHING AYA
- PORTRAIT
- wish
- yakusoku
- decade: Character Song Collection 1989~1998

=== Singles ===
- Sunday
- Aoi Sora wo Dakishimetai
- Tameiki ga Nemuranai
- Kono Michi ga Owaru Made ni
- Kokoro Made Dakishimeraretara
- Kore wa Kore de Arikana Nante...
