= List of Shinzo characters =

The following is a list of characters from the anime and manga series Shinzo.

== Main characters ==
=== Yakumo Tatsuro ===
Voiced by: Yūko Minaguchi (Japanese); Peggy O'Neal (English)

Yakumo Tatsuro (神童八雲, Shindō Yakumo) is the last surviving human and the female protagonist of the series. She has celestial powers as a result of absorbing one of the four gems from the meteor that held Lanancuras. She hates violence and follows the path of peace, until she eventually learns violence is required to achieve that peace. She's in love with Mushrambo but Mushra attempts to show his love several times for her and she responds kindly in turn but it is unconfirmed as to whether she loves him as well. Yakumo is extremely powerful, able to match any of Lanancuras' minions. She is also considered to be the biggest threat to Lanancuras. Yakumo is exceedingly stubborn and even after Mushra, Kutal, and Sago discover their origins as the evil Mushrambo, she doesn't give up faith in them. Yakumo's gentle nature and kind heart have the ability to change those that are around her long enough for the better and she's always trying to protect those she loves. Yakumo seems to be at least semi-capable with a sword, able to duel with Black Mushrambo and even outmatch him momentarily. In one episode, it is shown that Yakumo can play the piano when it came to finding out King Nipper's connections with her father. Her powers activate during their encounter with Rusephine, and she very rapidly gains mastery over them. Immediately after she discovers them, Rusephine fires several energy bolts at her which she blocks, though her shields rapidly drain her strength. Her powers also appear in the first timeline to be more telekinetic as she uses them to hurl a massive rock at Satan Mushrambo. In spite of her kind nature and after believing her three friends in the form of Mushrambo to be dead, she informs Satan Mushrambo "All my life, I have tried not to be a vengeful person. But that is over! I cannot forgive you!" As the series progresses she becomes more and more powerful to the point where she can easily eliminate many enemies which Sago, Mushra, and Kutal struggle with even in their hyper-forms.

In the second timeline, as they near the meteor where Lanancuris is imprisoned, her powers begin to dwindle due to her constant use, since she uses them to maintain the seal even while asleep. In spite of every one else telling her to stop and to rest, she insists on using her power to weaken Lanancuras as much as she possibly can, and even though they try to distance her from the fight she continues to send her power. After a tear-filled conversation with Binka, she dies at sunset which all of the characters immediately sense. Yakumo's power is so great that even after her death, she uses her power to revive Mushrambo's EnCard so that he can fight against Lanancuras, in spite of it being burned and scattered. Her spirit joins Mushra as he carries Lanancuras into the flare from the sun, presumably to comfort him in his final moments (though he's shown later alive). Her spirit informs Mushra that she has finally reached Shinzo. Yakumo deeply impacts the lives of Mushra, Saago, Kutal, Binka, and the kittens, and they are nearly overwhelmed by her death. However, she also gives them the hope to continue on and live for the future in anime.

In the manga version, her fate is different where she marries Mushra, they have a daughter together, and live happily in a village with her friends.

Yakumo is a loose nod to Tang Sanzang from the Chinese classic novel, Journey to the West.

=== Mushra ===
Voiced by: Minami Takayama (Japanese); Tom Gibis (English)

Mushra (マシュラ, Mashura) is an Ex-Celestial Guardian and the male protagonist of the series. He is a human-type Enterran with fire-based powers. Mushra is a stubborn and at times naive; unlike Yakumo he believes that violence is necessary. He can transform into Hyper Mushra (フェニックスマシュラ, Fenikkusu Mashura; Phoenix Mushra), a phoenix-themed armored warrior by quoting "Hyper Flame." Hyper Mushra eventually received a boost by King Nipper, giving him orange bird-like wings. Originally a Celestial Guardian, he became an Enterran so he can try to stop Lanancuras, without memory of his previous life. He eventually resumed original form at the end of the series into Celestial Mushra (ゴッドマシュラ, Goddo Mashura; 'God Mushra'). He is in love with Yakumo ever since she freed him from being hanged over the waterfall.

In the manga version, he marries Yakumo and the two have a daughter.

Mushra is a loose nod to Sun Wukong from the Chinese classic novel Journey to the West.

=== Sago ===
Voiced by: Yasuhiko Kawazu (Japanese); Steve Blum (English)

Sago (サーゴ, Sāgo; 'Sargo') is a water-elemental human Enterran. Hyper Sago is something described as a water devil which he can transform into by quoting "Hydro Power." Hyper Sago gained bat-like wings from the boost he received from King Nipper giving him bat-like wings. He can create Aqua Dragons out of water as one of this attacks. Sago is the only one who can use his element outside of his Hyper Form as seen when he used a water attack on some of King Nipper's robot guards.

Sāgo is a loose nod to Sha Wujing from the Chinese classic novel Journey to the West.

=== Kutal ===
Voiced by: Naoki Tatsuta (Japanese); Bob Papenbrook (English)

Kutal (クータル, Kūtaru; 'Kurtar') is an Earth-elemental humanoid cat Enterran. Hyper Kutal is a liger with seismic-themed attacks which he can transform into by quoting "Eye of the Lion." Kutal is a cook and a traveler, even though he usually sends the group in the wrong direction to Shinzo. He is also a heavy eater. Kutal later received a power boost from King Nipper, giving him fairy-like wings.

Kutal is a loose nod to Zhu Bajie, from the Chinese classic novel Journey to the West.

=== Mushrambo ===
Voiced by: Minami Takayama (Japanese); Dan Lorge (normal form), Steve Blum (Gold) (English)

By absorbing Hyper Sago and Hyper Kutal's EnCards, Hyper Mushra becomes the reborn Ultimate Warrior of Enterra named Mushrambo (破壊神マシュランボー, Hakushin Mashrambo; Destroyer Musharambo) (in his debut episode, the command for the transformation was "Hyper Flame Mushrambo!").

Ryuma tried to control Mushrambo with the Black Card, becoming Black Mushrambo (漆黒の破壊神ブラックマシュランボー), only to be killed by the corrupted warrior who, as it turned out, Ryuma was not able to control. When Yakumo attempted to save him, she was told by Ryuma's minion who made the card that she would have to use Ryuma's sword to cut the card out of Mushrambo.

When Black Mushrambo attempts to kill her, Yakumo uses her love and pure heart to purify him and destroys the black card. Mushrambo later becomes Gold Mushrambo (黄金の守護神ゴールドマシュランボー, Ongon Shugojin Gorudo Mashrambo; Golden Guard Gold Mushrambo) during his final battle with Dark King Mushrambo. This power-boost was revoked by the Reversian Blade during the battle with Lanancuras.

=== Hakuba ===
Voiced by: Tsutomu Kashiwakura (Japanese); Tom Fahn (English)

Hakuba (ハクバー, Hakubā) is a Celestial Equine that came to Earth like Mushra has. Taking on a robotic-form, Hakuba served to protect Yakumo and serve as her mode of transportation. Hakuba is a loyal and gentle guardian for Yakumo and helps her adapt to her greatly changed world. Any EnCard placed in him can either give him the abilities of the Enterran or open a portal to another part of Enterra.

During the battle with Lanancuras, he absorbed the EnCards of the six Enterran generals and reassumed his true form, the Reversian Blade. The Reversian Blade later broke during battle when Lancuras' power was increased after absorbing Yakumo's lifeless body.

=== Binka ===
Voiced by: Aya Hisakawa (Japanese); Philece Sampler (English)

Binka (ビンカ) is a young girl introduced in the second timeline, sent out by Yakumo (who helped her after her parents were killed) to find the chosen ones. She is armed with a bazooka and several other weapons. Personality-wise she is the opposite of Yakumo where Binka is spunky, tomboyish, and short-tempered unlike the demure and gentle Yakumo, whom she loves like a mother nevertheless. Finding Mushra and the others, she keeps them on track on their journey though she is constantly bemused by their lack of resolve. She rides in a turtle-like robot which seems to have a mind of its own, but it is unknown whether the turtle is human-made or something akin to Hakuba. Binka has no powers of her own yet still fights with all her might. She and Hakuba are the only ones with Yakumo when she dies and she seems to be the most deeply affected. In spite of her bravery, Binka can be very insecure and has terrible nightmares on a regular basis. She remains loyal to Yakumo no matter what and often takes it upon herself to take care of Yakumo as she starts to lose strength.

== Supporting characters ==
Rei, Sean, Estee (レイ, セン, サンジュ, Rei, Sen, Sanju)
Rei Voiced by: Fushigi Yamada (Japanese); Dorothy Elias-Fahn (English)
Sen Voiced by: Chie Sawaguchi (Japanese); Brianne Siddall (English)
Estee Voiced by: Ai Maeda (Japanese); Sandy Fox (English)

Kutal's nephews and niece. Out of all three of the kittens, Estee is the most out spoken. Rei and Sen are often difficult to distinguish from each other.

Dr. Daigo Tatsuro
Voiced by: Banjō Ginga (Japanese); Stephen Apostolina (English)

A scientist who was the father of Yakumo. Daigo had helped to develop the cure for the DNA Virus and helped to create the Enterrans. During the war against the Enterrans, Daigo knew they were losing the war against the Enterrans. Under the inspiration of the Celestial Guardians, he built a place where he could make Yakumo survive, knowing she was special. By the time Yakumo was at the age of 4, Daigo had finished building an underground for Yakumo to survive in, which would allow her to live for 30 years and only grow a single year in physical shape (50 in the English version). Just at the moment this happened, Mushrambo destroyed the last sanctuary of the humans (the place called Shinzo). Then Mushrambo went after Yakumo and killed Daigo in the process.

King Nipper
Voiced by: Joe Ochman

Nipper is a robot who was once Dr. Tatsuro's robotic partner, he became the ruler of Mechano City. However, he reluctantly became a whipping boy for Queen Rusephine's minion Caris, making him hated by his people. But by the time Yakumo arrived, Nipper revealed his true nature and sacrificed himself to give time for Yakumo's three bodyguards to undergo the power boost he planned for them. Dies after telling the heroes about the Seven Enterran Generals.

Bolt
Voiced by: Brad MacDonald

Bolt is a robot who is the leader of a Robotic Rebellion against King Nipper until learning the truth about him.

Clip
Voiced by: Wendee Lee

A female robot friend of Bolt's in the Rebellion.

Chip

A fat robot who is a friend of Bolt's in the Rebellion.

Toggle

A skinny robot who is another friend of Bolt's in the Rebellion.

Daigo

Daigo was a giant warrior robot named after Yakumo's father Dr. Daigo Tatsuro. Originally Daigo seems to lack any sentience, being only controlled by the rider. But after Yakumo's tears hit its controls, it develops a personality of its own and fights without her control. He was destroyed by Caris while Mushra, Sago, and Kutal were being recharged.

Celestial Guardians
Celestial Guardian #1 Voiced by: Paul St. Peter
Celestial Guardian #2 Voiced by: Bob Papenbrook
Celestial Guardian #3 Voiced by: Jamieson Price

The Celestial Guardians are beings that are responsible for creating Mushra and sealing Lanancuras into a meteor.

Koyakumo (コヤクモ)

She is the daughter born to Mashura and Yakumo, who appeared in the epilogue of the manga version. She is a half-Matrixer, half-human. She has a cheerful and innocent personality. Although her name was not mentioned in the manga, she was officially named "Koyakumo" in the audio drama on the bonus disc of the complete DVD.

== Antagonists ==
Lanacuras
Voiced by: Takeshi Aono (Japanese); Tom Wyner (English)

The main antagonist of the series who surfaced in the 2nd timeline, though he was an influence in the first. An Ex-Celestial Guardian, he became a god of sorts to the Kadrians as they intended to revive him.

=== Seven Enterran Generals ===
The seven most powerful Enterrans who led the Enterrans to destroy the human race. Yakumo and company only encountered the first four in the first timeline. In the second timeline, the EnCards of the six other generals remained in Hakuba and enable him to use their power to transform.

Insect King Daku (昆虫王ドッカク, Dokkaku)
Voiced by: Kenji Utsumi (Japanese); Paul St. Peter (English)

Daku is the first of the Enterran Generals that the main characters encounter and the King of the Insect Enterrans and a Hercules beetle-themed knight. He is able to assume a gold-armored samurai-like Hyper Form by quoting "I summon my power as the Insect King." When Daku absorbed an EnCard, he gained the power of invisibility. He is later carded by Mushra, Sago, and Kutal.

Reptile Emperor Ryuma (爬虫王リュウマ, Ryūma)
Voiced by: Mami Koyama (normal & Hyper Ryuma); Kunihiko Yasui (Grand Ryuma) (Japanese)

Ryuma is the second of the Enterran Generals that the main characters encounter, the Emperor of the Reptile Enterrans, and one of a few Enterrans who look like humans. When he assumes his Hyper Form by quoting "Hyper Serpent Warrior," he has a near-reptile appearance and his rapier morphs into a two-edged sword. Devised a cunning scheme to bring the warrior Mushrambo to his bidding by forcing Mushra, Kutal, and Sago to become Mushrambo and use a mind controlling Black Card which one of his minions crafted to do so. Ryuma lured the three into a battle with his subordinate Grandora, succeeding in taking control of Mushrambo who transforms into Black Mushrambo. He then kidnaps Yakumo, deciding to marry her to prove his superiority. He has been shown to conjure snakes out of thin air and convert them into something as seen when he turns a bunch of them into a wedding dress for Yakumo. However, it causes Black Mushrambo to turn on Ryuma upon crashing his wedding. Ryuma then assumes his Hyper Form and then absorbs Grandora's EnCard to become Grand Ryuma, a giant dragonoid with a broadsword. In this state, he attempted to use his freezing breath on Black Mushrambo, yet was carded when Black Mushrambo released a dark energy burst as the two locked swords. Even though Ryuma shows a narcissistic, sadistic, and psychopathic personality, he does show concern for Ungra when she is mortally injured defending him. Though Ryuma was carded, his rapier remained as Yakumo uses it to remove the Black Card from Mushrambo.

Bird Queen Rusephine (獣王ルシフェーヌ, Rushifēnu)
Voiced by: Keiko Han (Japanese); Melodee Spevack (18), Wendee Lee (19-20) (English)

Rusephine is the third of the Enterran Generals that the main characters encounter and the Queen of the Bird Enterrans with power over time and space. While Rusephine's normal form has an angel-like appearance, her hyper form has a harpy-like appearance when she transforms by quoting "Hyper Talons." Her lair is in the middle of the ocean on where Egypt used to be. Attacking Mechano City in retaliation for the death of her warrior Caris, Rusephine uses her powers to teleport Mushra, Kutal, and Sago back in time. Then, after her servants bring her the cards of the three remaining Enterran Generals, Rusephine goes after Yakumo to obtain the cards of Daku and Ryuma as well to increase her own power. Absorbing the other generals' cards, Rusephine assumes General Monster (ゼネラルモンスター, Zeneraru Monstā) form with her waist and below transformed into a massive mix of all the other generals. When Golden Mushrambo challenges her, Rusephine uses her power to summon the original Mushrambo to present only to be carded and absorbed by him.

Sea King Franken (海洋王クラーケン, Kurāken; Sea Queen Kraken)

King of the Sea Enterrans. Carded prior to the series, presumably killed by Rusephine. Originally a female when looking closer at the card but dubbed as King. Her Japanese name is modeled after Kraken.

Beast King Diehanger (猛獣王ダイハンガー, Daihangā)

King of the Wild Beast Enterrans. He resembled a smilodon with long yellow hair. Carded prior to the series, presumably killed by Rusephine.

Phantom King Kimylas (幻獣王キマイラス, Kimairasu)

King of the Phantom Beast Enterrans. Carded prior to the series, presumably killed by Rusephine. His name and form are modeled after a Chimera where he has a centaur-like build with an unspecified blue creature for the torso while the lower portion of his body appears to be lion-like.

Original Mushrambo
Voiced by: Minami Takayama (Japanese); Dan Lorge (English)

The original Mushrambo was an Enterran with celestial powers, a result of absorbing three of the four gems from the meteor that held Lanacuras. He fell under influence of Lanancuras' evil and led the other six Eterran Generals in wiping out the humans. Eventually killed by Yakumo's aura, his three gems scattered and entered the three Enterrans that would be able to combine into the current Mushrambo. He was later brought to the present by Rusephine to help her fight Golden Mushrambo. However, Mushrambo cards her and absorbed the powers of the other Generals to assume a dark angel form, commonly known as Dark King Mushrambo (悪魔王サタンマシュランボー, Akumaō Satan Mashuranbō; Devil King Satan Mushrambo). Dark King Mushrambo also uses Rusephine's power to fight Golden Mushrambo, easily defeating his counterpart with time manipulation. After a lengthy and horrific battle, Dark King Mushrabo was finally killed by Mushra, Sago and Kutal. But as Mushrambo was summoned prior to the Enterrans' war with humans, it caused the timeline to change.

==== Minions of the Enterran Generals ====
Various antagonists who serve as subordinates for three of the Six Enterran Generals:

- Katris (1-2)

Voiced by: Hideyuki Hori (Japanese); Joe Ochman (English)

A bounty hunter and grasshopper-type Insect Enterran. He was the one that captured Mushra and Yakumo and had them hanging from the remains of the Statue of Liberty. When Mushra assumed his Hyper-Enterran form, Katris absorbed two insect cards to assume his Hyper-Enterran form. Upon catching up to Yakumo, Katris absorbed Queen Bee-ing's card and fought Mushra again. Carded by Hyper Mushra.

- Queen Bee-Ing (2)

Voiced by: Kazuko Sugiyama (Japanese); Mari Devon (English)

Queen of the Honey Bee-Ings and Hunting Bee-Ings. She believed that by consuming Yakumo, she would obtain her beauty. Transformed by the command "Hyper Bee-Stinger!". Carded by Hyper Mushra and was later absorbed by Katris where her face appeared on Katris' body.

- Big Blue and his brother (3)

Big Blue Voiced by: Steve Blum
Big Blue's Brother Voiced by: Bob Papenbrook

Big Blue and his unnamed older brother are two Spider-type Enterrans. Attacked with "Web of Destruction". After capturing Yakumo (who was ill at the time), their threat of dropping her into the Web of Destruction enraged Sago and Kutal and led to them Hyper-Forming into their Hyper-Enterran Forms as Big Blue and his older brother assumed their Hyper-Enterran forms. Even though they were defeated, Big Blue was carded by his older brother who assumed a stronger form and ended up netting Yakumo. Carded by Hyper Mushra who slashed their cards.

- Tombo (4)

Voiced by: Tom Wyner

A Centipede-type Insect Enterran. His attacks included Light of Illusion and Light of Blindness. Transformed into a humanoid form by the command "Hyper Mode Elumination!". Tombo was hatched to target Yakumo at an Insect Enterran amusement park. Carded by Hyper Mushra.

- Caterpillar Soldiers (5-6)

Voiced by: Bill Capeze

Servants of King Daku that rode giant caterpillars. Shown in the flashback of the wars with the humans brutally slaughtering a fleeing crowd of people.

- Katai (5-6)

Voiced by: Dan Lorge

A shapeshifting Insect Hyper-Enterran and servant of King Daku. He posed as a human named Kiri to lure Yakumo into Daku's castle, saying it was Shinzo. As Kiri he used his sway over Yakumo to help force away Saago, Kutal, and Mushra so as to lure her in by herself. Carded by Daku who used his powers for invisibility.

- Doctor Parasite (6)

Voiced by: Derek Stephen Prince

An Insect Enterran scientist and servant of Daku who specializes in brainwashing. He uses maggot type things to crawl into Mushra and Co.'s brains to devour them and make them mindless slaves. Doctor Parasite's plan backfires and he's left covered by his own maggots. His current fate is unknown.

- Crocodile Enterran Leader (7)

Voiced by: Beau Billingslea

An unnamed crocodile-type Reptile Enterran who alongside other Crocodile Enterrans ambushed Mushra and Yakumo by the river where the latter was bathing. After the other crocodiles were defeated, the Crocodile Leader hyper-formed and fought Mushra. Carded by Hyper Mushra.

- Waru (7-8)

Voiced by: Lex Lang

The King of the Lizard Enterrans and servant of Gyasa who plotted to destroy Mushra. He is able to turn his right hand into a sword, move through solid wall and shot metal darts from his mouth. He could also attack with a "Tongue Whip". He first ran into a chameleon-type Enterran who he caught plotting to attack. After the lead Crocodile Enterran was carded, Waru plotted to kill Mushra. While at an abandoned school, Waru assisted Gyasa into capturing Yakumo as Waru fought Mushra. Killed by Gyasa after Hyper Mushra broke his hand/sword with Gyasa saying "Without your blade, you're nothing". In the second timeline, a flashback has Mushra recalling that Waru was a champion of an unknown tournament.

- Gyasa (8-11)

Voiced by: Ryūsei Nakao (Japanese); Derek Stephen Prince (English)

The King of the Snake Enterrans. A Gorgon-like Reptile Enterran who can turn anyone to stone with the venom of his snake-like blonde dreadlocks and even undo the petrifying process. Whenever he survives a near-death experience in battle, Gyasa sheds his skin to increase his power. His attacks include Gyasa Blade, Venom Blast, and Thunder Venom. He becomes the demon-like Hyper Gyasa after summoning and absorbing numerous snake EnCards (captions said rattlesnakes, mambas, copperheads, cobras and pit vipers). His attacks as Hyper Gyasa included Hyper Viper Power, Spinning Snake Disc, Reptillian Water Blast, Hyper Venom, Hyper Gand Knife, Viper Cannon, Python Power Beam and Serpent Mind Control. He accompanied Waru in a plot to capture Yakumo which he did while Waru fought Mushra. After Waru's blade was broken by Mushra, Gyasa killed Waru and turned Yakumo to stone before engaging Mushra, Sago, and Kutal. Though he managed to card Sago and Kutal, this only lead to the first formation of Mushrambo and Gyasa meets his end at Mushrambo's hands. It is implied that Gyasa has a limited number of skins to shed, as he opts to Hyper-Form and fight instead of letting himself become damaged again and growing stronger. In Hyper-Form, he's able to absorb the damage from an enemy's attacks and deflect it back at them. However Mushrambo targets his weak point, which is on his head which cards Gyasa.

- Huntari (12)

Voiced by: David Lodge

A frilled lizard-type Reptile Enterran and bounty hunter armed with an axe. Absorbed by a live plant and his seeds scattered upon the plant's destruction.

- Ungra (13-14)

Voiced by: Mary Elizabeth McGlynn

A Reptile Enterran alchemist and servant of Ryuma. She created the Black Card that was used on Mushrambo, and was against the idea of Ryuma marrying Yakumo. She was the one to release Grandora from where he was kept in stone. She dies trying to defend her master from a falling portion of the castle ceiling when Black Mushrambo attacks. Before she dies, she informs Yakumo that the only way to save Mushrambo from the Black Card is for Yakumo to take Ryuma's sword and cut it out of him. Even though she was very supportive of Ryuma's plan, when she realises she has created what she and Ryuma were trying to prevent: the release of the "dark spirit"(Dark Mushrambo), she shows regret for doing so ("What have I done?") and apologises to Yakumo ("Forgive me!'), telling her how to stop the corrupted warrior before dying.

- Grandora (13-14)

A three-headed Ice Dragon controlled by Ryuma. Grandora heads uses a different form of attacking with ice: one of Grandora's heads roar is like a blizzard, another of his heads shoots ice in different shapes (like cubes for example), and his last head shoots an ice beam. In Ryuma's great plan to gain control of Mushrambo, Grandora was summoned to attack the city where Mushra, Sago, Kutal, and Yakumo were holding residence. After a large scale attack on the city, the three heroes became Mushrambo whereas Ryuma used his Black Card to bring his plan to fruition despite Yakumo trying to prevent Ryuma into doing so. When Black Mushrambo attacked the ice palace where Ryuma and Yakumo's wedding was taking place, Grandora made a short-lived attempt to guard his master. Grandora was overpowered by the Black Mushrambo and the beast was absorbed by Ryuma to become Grand Ryuma.

- Lord Caris (15-18)

Voiced by: Junko Shimakata (Japanese); Tom Wyner (English)

A powerful Tengu-like Bird Enterran that works for Rusephine. He and the bird Enterrans have been making King Nipper and his soldiers hunt for Yakumo while dealing with Bolt's resistance group. His attacks as Hyper Caris included Feather Blade, Hyper Claw, and Hyper Thorn. He absorbed an Egg EnCard that mutated him into the deformed Ultra Hyper Caris (whose attacks included Ultra Hyper Claw and Ultra Hyper Thorn) that sports fleshy tentacles covered in toothy mouths. One of the attacks upon Ultra Hyper Caris ended up regressing him back to Hyper Caris. He was carded by Hyper Mushra in his own newly gained "Ultra Hyper Form".

- Gabriel (19-20)

An Angel-like Bird Enterran servant of Rusephine. He presents her the EnCards of Franken, Diehanger and Kimylas (other Enterran generals). His fate is unknown after his mistress was carded and the timeline altered.

=== Kadrians ===
The Kadrians are an alien race whose homeworld was crashed through by the Meteor that Lanancuras was entombed in, trapping their lifeforce within it. Kadrians are different from Enterrans in different ways: they were not made by humans, they come from another world, and they are shapeshifters. Their purpose is to revive Lanancuras from his tomb and prevent the revival of Mushrambo. When a Kadrian is carded, their card is shown to have an octagon-like shape.

Eilis (アイリス, Eirisu; 22-25)
Voiced by: Hisao Egawa (Japanese); Steve Blum (English)

The prideful and sadistic commander of the Kadrian army, his body is made of quicksilver metal that allows him to alter his form. Eilis is also capable of covering large areas in quicksilver and altering any area of it as he desired. He is even seen altering an entire waterfall and lake. Could attack with a powerful "Solar Inferno". Eilis very nearly killed Mushra during their initial encounter, and chased the main characters until he was able to corner them. He created a Metalasaur (a metal dinosaur) during the fight with Mushra's group. He easily carded Sago and Kutal and impaled Hyper Mushra with his own spear. However, while taunting the injured Mushra and threatening to kill Binka, he gave Hyper Mushra the will and reason to transform and become Mushrambo for the first time in the second timeline. In spite of his incredible power, he was easily carded by Mushrambo who mocked him before finishing him off.

Lunaria (ルナリア; 22-26)
Voiced by: Mami Kingetsu

Lunaria is the Second-in-command of the Kadrians. Her servants were myth-based. She creates "Hyper-Forming" seals to give her monsters an advantage over normal Enterrans, which can even prevent the formation of Mushrambo. She is capable of creating dimension-altering "mazes" to trap the main characters. She also manages to trap them in an area the size of a card on the outside, but building-sized on the inside. One of her monsters very nearly killed the main characters but Yakumo suddenly appeared, taking her by surprise, and she was killed by Yakumo's aura. Lunaria was far more cunning and intelligent than her commander and recognized Mushrambo and Yakumo to be viable threats to their plans. She came very close to killing Yakumo with an energy attack that targeted her directly in the ruins of Shinzo where she was using her power to boost the seal on Lanancuras. In spite of her destruction at Yakumo's hands, she was very possibly the reason why Lanancuris was eventually able to escape, since her attack and her forcing Yakumo to a large quantity of power in a very brief period of time to save the others drastically weakened Yakumo and most likely helped lead to her death.

- Garizani (22)

Voiced by: Shinobu Satouchi (Japanese); Lex Lang (English)

A centipede/lobster Kadrian and first opponent in the second timeline. He attacked the town that Mushra and Binka were in. Before he was carded by Hyper Mushra, he shouted for his master to avenge him.

- Shiro & Kuro (23)

Shiro Voiced by: Steve Kramer
Kuro Voiced by: Hiromi Konno (Japanese); Lex Lang (English)

Furball-Like Kadrian brothers that serve Lunaria. They tried to get on Binka's good side while attempting to take the two remaining crystals. But after a while, the two revealed their true forms: A black bear with a yellow mask (Kuro) and a white bear with a purple mask (Shiro). They can combine to form a non-menacing giant panda with a bamboo stick as a weapon (by the command "Kadrian Bear!") and turn into a menacing red panda-like super-predator (by the command "Hyper Kadrian Predator!"). Carded by Hyper Mushra, Hyper Sago, and Hyper Kutal. The duo's names were puns on White (Shiro) & Black (Kuro).

- Pixie Kadrian (26)

Voiced by: Yūko Nagashima (Japanese); Mari Devon (English)

Servant of Lunaria that can use wind-based attacks, such as Tornado Blast and Whirlwind Attack. She trapped anyone in Lunaria's maze. Carded by Mushra.

- Troll Kadrian (26)

A servant of Lunaria with ox-like ears and horns that posed as Yakumo until his cover was blown. He could sprout as many arms as he wants. He almost succeeded in killing the heroes when Yakumo's aura carded him along with Lunaria.

- Kadrian Foot Soldiers

The foot soldiers of the Kadrians that work for Lanancuras and Lunaria.

- Granite Warriors

The Kadrians' foot soldiers created by Lanancuras from some rocks.
