= Kaori Futenma =

Japanese singer-songwriter (born 1973)

Kaori Futenma 普天間 かおり
- Born: 23 September 1973 (age 52); Nakagusuku, Okinawa, Japan
- Genres: Anison; Japanese pop Ryukyuan music
- Occupations: Singer-songwriter philanthropist radio personality
- Instrument: Vocals
- Years active: 1991–present
- Labels: Starchild Records (1991–1992); Teichiku Records (2002–present)
- Website: www.futenma.net

Kaori Futenma (普天間 かおり, Futenma Kaori; born 23 September 1973) is a Japanese singer-songwriter, radio personality, philanthropist and goodwill ambassador for Bandai Plateau in Kita-Shiobara Village, Yama District, Fukushima. She is originally from Nakagusuku village, in Nakagami county, Okinawa, Japan.

== Biography ==
Kaori Futenma was born into a bloodline of the royal family of the Ryūkyū Kingdom. She started her singing career at the age of 3 and used to be acclaimed in local music competitions in Okinawa. In 1991, Futenma signed with King Records and rose to prominence singing mostly anime songs under her stage name "Kaori Honma," but 6 years later changed her stage name to the real one to pursue a career as a singer-songwriter. In 1999 she signed with Teichiku records and since then CDs have been released by the label. In most of songs she penned she expresses her emotions about her home, Okinawa, on the lyrics.

In addition to her career as a singer, she performs as the host of radio shows e.g. she podcasts a show "Kaori Futenma's Summer Wind Letters (Japanese:普天間かおりの真南風便り|Futenma Kaori no Mafē Dayori)" on Radio Fukushima. Futenma appears on radio shows and TV commercials mainly on local broadcast stations in Fukushima.

On 11 March 2011, she encountered the 2011 Tōhoku earthquake while performing on a live radio show on Radio Fukushima. In the wake of the disasters, she founded a project called "Smile Again 0311" to benefit victims and started performing charity concerts for people who live in evacuation shelters and conducting benefit concerts to raise funds, also, penned a charity song called "Smile Again" and released it on the Internet and donated proceeds to those who suffered the disasters. Additionally, Futenma's since participated in another project called "Smile Books(Japanese:スマイル文庫|sumairu bunko)" hand in hand with local people and champions for the project in Jinbōchō, Tokyo, the most famous bookstore street in Japan—the aim of the project is book donation to children in Fukushima—she also tours round evacuation shelters and reads books and performs concerts for them as a member of the project. On this activity, she gains support for the project and builds bridges between philanthropists from various different fields.

== Discography ==
=== Singles ===
Kaori Honma
Year	A-side	B-side	Chart positions	Note
1991	"Tsukamaete Ite"	"Hoshi no Lullaby"	28	'Ronin Warriors: Message (anime video)' theme songs. The B-side was composed by Ritsuko Okazaki.
1991	"Toshiue (the single version)"	"Omoide ni Sayonara"	—	Composed by Ritsuko Okazaki.
1991	"Jinsei Madamada Agedaman"	"Sekai wa Watashi no Tame ni"	—	'Genji Tsūshin Agedama (TV anime series)' theme songs.
1992	"Soreike Kororin"	"Tengoku no Komori-uta"	—	'Chikyū SOS Soreike Kororin (TV anime series)' theme songs. The B-side was composed by Ritsuko Okazaki.
1992	"Tokoroga Dokkoi! Sexy-Musume"	"Kowarekaketa Kagami"	—	'Devil Hunter Yohko 2 (anime video)' theme songs.

Kaori Futenma
Year	A-side	B-side	Chart positions	Note
2000	"Unmei no Ito"	"Hikari no Kawa"	—	
2001	"Kono Chikyū ni Umarete"	"Daijōbu Dayo..."	—	
2002	"Kami Nanka Kittari Shinai"	"Akubi"	—	
2003	"Harukana Ai..."	"Itsuka no Sora"	—	The A-side is the theme song for 'Semishigure (jidaigeki show on NHK)'.
2004	"Inori"	"Waratte"	—	The A-side was on-aired on a children's show called 'Minna no Uta' on NHK from June to July 2004.
2005	"Nakenai Rhapsody"	"Ai no Uta"	—	
2006	"Hanahoshi Sanka"	"Kimi no Sanka," "Hanahoshi Sanka ("Eurasia Version" i.e. a Russian version)	—	"Eurasia Version" was used as a closing theme for 'Bi no Kyojin tachi,' an arts documentary show on TV Tokyo, from January to March 2006.
2007	"Mamoritai mono"	"Warai"	—	The A-side was used on a local TV commercial for a Hina-matsuri doll company in Fukushima called Ningyō no Tōgetsu: Futenma appeared on the commercial. It was also used as a closing theme for 'Iitabi Yume-Kibun," a travel show on TV Tokyo, in July 2006.
2008	"Tsukame nai mono"	"Beautiful Name"	—	The A-side was used as a closing theme for a TV show called Uwasa no! Tokyo Magazine on TBS from January to March 2008.
2008	"Mamoritai mono"	"Warai"	—	A limited edition with DVD.
2009	"Hallelujah"	—	—	A cover version of Leonard Cohen's 'Hallelujah'; Futenma wrote the Japanese lyrics.
2010	"Hitsuyō Nan Dayo"	"Mamoritai mono (Acoustic version)"	164	
2014	"Sakura Mau Machi de"	"Sakura Mau Machi de (sung by Toshiro "Bin" Murai)", " Sakura Mau Machi de (duet with Murai)"	—	All the proceeds from this single are donated to a charity called "Yorunomori no Sakura Hozen Kikin (the Yorunomori cherry blossom conservation foundation)" to help conserve cherry blossoms in Tomioka, Fukushima.

=== Albums ===
Kaori Honma
Year	Title	Chart positions	Note
1991	Message	—	

Kaori Futenma
Year	Title	Chart position	Note
1997	Mafē	—	An indie album
1999	"14-tsubu no Ai no Shizuku"	—	Label: Bandai Music Entertainment
2004	Yugafu	—	Label: Teichiku (from then on)
2004	Yuragi	—	Containing "Kami Nanka Kittari Shinai," "Akubi," "Harukana Ai," "Itsuka no Sora," "Inori" and "Waratte."
2006	MONSOON	—	Containing "Hanahoshi Sanka (A-side version and "Eurasia Version") and "Aeka naru Ai," which was used as a closing theme for "Shuji-i ga Mitsukaru Shinryojo," a medical talk show on TV Tokyo.
2007	Precious	—	Containing "Inori," "Waratte," "Mamoritai Mono" and "Tsukame nai Mono."
2010	Kaori Futenma Singles Best Collection And More!	—	Containing all the A-sides and a B-side ("Daijōbu Dayo..."), plus a cover of an Okinawa folk song and two unreleased songs.
2012	Smile Again	—	Containing "Smile Again" and "Mamoritai Mono (Acoustic Version)".
2014	Mellow	—	A cover album.

== Filmography ==
=== TV ===
Kaori Futenma

- "Tokimeki Wide" / 4 February 2000 / NHK
- "Beauty Tsūshin" / 1 July 2001 / BS Japan
- "Studio Park" / 24 August 2001 / NHK
- "NHK Kayō Concert" / 23 November 2001, 22 January and 10 December 2002 / NHK
- "Music Tide" / 22 September 2003 / BS-i
- "Jojōka Dai-zenshu 2010" / 30 October 2010 / NHK-BS2
- "Ongaku no Hi" / 29 June 2013 / TBS

=== Radio ===
Kaori Honma

- "Kaori no Hello! Ani Pop" (in Japanese) / October 1990 – September 1997 / Tokai Radio Broadcasting

Kaori Futenma

- "Kattobi Wide" / Radio Fukushima
- "Futenma Kaori no Ahaha de Ufufu" / Tōkai Radio Broadcasting, Ryūkyū Hōsō
- "Chura-Sunday" / Radio Fukushima
- "Kaori no Let's Night" / Radio Fukushima
- "Kenji to Kaori no Friend Radio" / Radio Fukushima
