= Genji Tsūshin Agedama =

Japanese anime television series and its adaptations

- LaserDisc cover of Vol. 1. (From left to right) Ibuki, Agedaman and Onyomiko.
- Created by: Hiroshi Tsuruta; Akira Sakuma
- Directed by: Masato Namiki
- Music by: Toshihiko Sahashi
- No. of episodes: 51

Production
- Producers: Shinsuke Kurabayashi (TV Tokyo); Yutaka Sugiyama (NAS); Ayao Wakana (Studio Gallop)
- Animator: Studio Gallop
- Production companies: TV Tokyo; NAS

Original release
- Network: TXN (TV Tokyo)
- Release: October 4, 1991 – September 25, 1992

Genji Tsūshin Agedama (ゲンジ通信あげだま) is a Japanese anime series created by Sukehiro Tomita and Akira Sakuma, produced by NAS and TV Tokyo, and animated by Studio Gallop. The series was broadcast on TV Tokyo every Friday evening from October 4, 1991, to September 25, 1992. It centers around a kid hero who comes down to Earth in a city in Japan and often battles the city's resident rich girl and supervillainess. The anime contains many of references and parodies from other anime series as well as live-action shows and movies that were popular at the time, e.g., Kiki's Delivery Service, Kamen Rider X, A Taxing Woman, and Sailor Moon (which had started airing a few months afterward, and Usagi Tsukino would be played by the same voice actress as the love interest of this show).

Aside from the anime, two manga series and a PC Engine side-scrolling video game by NEC Home Electronics were made as tie-ins, all of which were also released in 1991. The first manga was written by Kazuhiko Shimamoto and was serialized in Deluxe BomBom, released a few months before the anime. This version followed an early draft that featured different scenarios and character designs to the ones shown in the anime and served as the basis for the video game. The second manga was written by Eiichi Saitō, which was published in Comic BomBom and followed the anime closely.

== Plot ==
Agedama Genji is a 4th-grade student from Planet Hero who landed in Morisoba City with his robotic computer friend Wapro for some training during his summer vacation, at his father's request. After their arrival, he joins East-Morisoba Elementary School, where he meets his shy but studious love interest, Ibuki Heike, and his archenemy, Rei Kuki, an enormously wealthy heiress who arbitrarily rules the city, shares her grandfather Raizo's ambition to conquer the world, and, as a first step, attacks the city with a variety of monsters that she and her grandfather create with the Monster-Cooker (怪獣合成マシン, Kaijuu-gousei-machine), which the rich old man invented. When they plot to attack the city, Rei transforms into "Onyomiko", the town's local supervillain. Agedama then retaliates by using Wapro to transform into "Agedaman", the young and mysterious superhero. Thus begins the endless battle between Agedaman and Onyomiko.

== Characters ==
=== Protagonists ===
==== Agedama Genji ====
- Voiced by: Nozomu Sasaki

The main character of the show. He was born on Planet Hero on 26 October, and is a child superhero-in-training, who came to Earth during his summer vacation. Though the cheerful youngster doesn't seem special on the surface to all observers, he's a natural-born daredevil with a strong sense of justice, and could is confident resolving any problems he finds. He uses silly, shortened versions of expressions (e.g. 'thanky!' for 'thank you'), and wears a wristwatch-shaped corded phone handset that enables him to communicate with his best friend Wapro when he's away. Wapro is also able to receive phone calls and route them to the handset. Agedama also has a huge crush on Ibuki Heike, a female student in his class who he fell in love with at first sight. When Onyomiko enters the scene with the synthetic beast of the day and tries to attack Morisoba City, Agedama uses Wapro to transform into the mysterious savior known as Agedaman, but he can't let anyone know of his secret. When he transforms into Agedaman, he displays superhuman physical abilities and fights mainly using the Agedaman Punch, Agedaman Kick, and the thick Frisbees attached to both his hips (often used together as the "Double Frisbee"). When he's in a jam, he often pumps himself up to produce "Spirit Cards" from his headgear by concentrating his spirit energy. The Spirit Card is a data card that resembles the PC-Engine's HuCards and Wapro uses them to analyze the information of the synthetic beast and calculate its weaknesses, allowing Agedaman to gain the upperhand.

His family name comes from The Tale of Genji, a classic Japanese literature, his given name means agedama (also called tenkasu, something he's made fun of for at one point). The name of the show comes from his name in the Japanese naming order, Genji Agedama, and the Tsūshin in the middle of it literally means communication, particularly telecommunication here on account of his connection to Wapro. In episode 49, Ebiten offers Agedama his old battle suit when Wapro is temporarily put out of commission. This outfit was a part of Agedama's initial design used in the first manga and the video game, which also gave him brown hair instead of dark blue. This same outfit even appears towards the end of the first opening.

==== Wapro ====
- Voiced by: Kumiko Watanabe

A word processor robot who came to Earth with Agedama. His base body type is usually that of a ball with retractable feet and a pair of antennas, but he's able to change into several other forms, including an armadillo, a school bag, a pocketbike, a Jet, and a Submarine. He is Agedama's best friend, and although they have occasional spats with each other, their friendship is always proven to be unbreakable. Once the city is in danger, he fuses with Agedama allowing him to become Agedaman, all while analyzing the enemy's data and finding the most appropriate way to attack. As a word processor robot, this little guy can't help but pronounce every text character when he speaks, even punctuation marks and symbols.

His name comes from the Japanese abbreviation of "word processor". His initial design had a pure shade of white with a green and orange color scheme, a more animal-like muzzle, and his antennas could also form a helicopter-like propeller.

==== Ibuki Heike ====
- Voiced by: Kotono Mitsuishi

The series' cute ponytailed heroine and token love interest, born on July 15. She's a fourth grader at East-Morisoba Elementary School and is the first friend Agedama makes on Earth. Though her true feelings towards Agedama are up in the air, she is clearly in love with Agedaman. Ibuki is an honest, kind, and good girl with many skills under her belt and a sense of justice equal to Agedama's. While she starts off as shy and timid, Agedama's motivation and earning title of class president gave her more confidence. She eventually becomes a lot more assertive and resilient to the point to where she's able to stand up to Rei, who uses her power to do whatever she pleases. However, her words and actions can be a bit unrestrained at times and she giggles a lot. Towards the end of the series, she becomes the super heroine, Super Ibuki (initially known as Wonder Ibuki). This results in several blatant references to Sailor Moon, which had started airing around the same time. She shares a voice actress with Usagi Tsukino and the scriptwriter, Sukehiro Tomita, was in charge of the early scripts of Sailor Moon.

Her family is named after The Tale of Heike (a classic novel published centuries ago). As for her hairstyle, she was originally designed with a twin-tailed hairstyle that was pink in early promotional material, including the video game and the ‘’Deluxe BomBom’’ manga. This design is shown in its current brown hair color in the first opening.

=== Villains ===
==== Rei Kuki ====
- Voiced by: Sakiko Tamagawa

The series' central antagonist, born on August 21. She is the daughter of the chairman of the Kuki Conglomerate and is infamous for being an extremely selfish brat who uses the power of money to take charge of those under her. She believes that she is the center of the universe and as such, she goes along with her grandfather Raizo's plans for world domination without question. She has to dominate in everything, be it beauty (She has proportions and good looks that make her look more like a teenager than an elementary school student), skill, or wealth, and she hates Agedama and Ibuki for always refusing to submit to her or attempting to challenge her. However, she is not entirely evil or selfish; she's also a hard worker who secretly pushes herself to remain number one. Her parents work and travel overseas all year round, so much that they don't have time to pay attention to her, so she harbors a sense of loneliness and sadness deep in her heart despite being left in the care of Raizo and the conglomerate's three butlers. When she dons her villainous battle suit and becomes Onyomiko, she takes command of a synthetic beast and makes that creature wreak havoc over things that get in the way of her current goal, even becoming one herself on a couple of occasions. Even though her battle suit doesn't have any special powers, Rei's high skill levels allows her to fight on equal terms with Agedaman, sometimes overwhelming him. By combining herself with PC-ro, the evil counterpart of Wapro, Onyomiko can transform into the stronger Hyper Onyomiko, but hardly ever wants to because she has to be stripped naked by the robot during the transformation procedure, and he's like a dirty old man.

The alias is a portmanteau of On'yomi (one of the two ways of reading kanji) and miko (Shinto priestess). This goes back to an early stage of the series' development, where Onyomiko was originally accompanied by a man named Bifū Kunreikan (the family name is a portmanteau of Kun'yomi, the other type of Kanji reading and shireikan, meaning commander), and the duo would plot to control all the kanji around the world, with Agedaman fighting to save the day. The video game and the first manga followed this plot, while Raizo and the butlers were made for the anime series.

==== Raizo Kuki ====
- Voiced by: Junpei Takiguchi

Rei's grandfather, also known as Notridamus XI. He's a rich old man with a very optimistic and upbeat personality and often comes up with ridiculous ideas, leaving those around him dumbfounded. He dotes on his granddaughter and spoils her thoroughly, but at the same time, he's trying to teach her the art of rulership, so he sometimes has to be strict with her. Like his granddaughter, he never gives up despite his old age. He was once an extremely poor man, but he succeeded in deciphering the "Chapter of Rise" in the "Great Prophecy of Notridamus" left by his ancestor, Notridamus I. Using that to successfully manage assets, he built one of the world's leading conglomerates in just one generation. Perhaps because of his origins, unlike Rei who's been rich for her entire life, he still has a somewhat "commoner" sensibility. He then began to live a life of leisure in a large mansion in Morisoba City, but he grew tired of it and, using the remaining prophecy "Chapter of World Conquest" to make money, he built a synthetic beast manufacturing machine and began plotting for world domination. Since then, he's been ordering his henchmen to bring several ingredients to his underground laboratory and, by putting them into Monster Cooker, creates miscellaneous monsters that Rei takes command of.

His alias (and the name of his ancestor for that matter) is a pun on nottori (Japanese:taking over someone else's property) and damasu (to deceive), while also being a spoof of Nostradamus' predictions.

==== The Butler Trio ====
The three henchmen of Raizo and Rei who often appear in black suits and sunglasses. Even though they're given the title of "butlers", they also work as the Kuki's bodyguards, caretakers, chauffeurs, valets, cooks, dining musicians, pilots, soldiers, and pretty much anything else Raizo or Rei wants them to do. They're often used as the main vessel of the synthetic beasts. They may look tough, but they aren't evil and are just conscientious men who are just doing their job. They even show sympathy for many of their victims affected by the Kuki's operations. They have been butlers for 13 years but have been working together for much longer. They work from 7am to midnight for a low monthly salary, and Raizo and Rei abuse them every day. Although they're promised a salary of two million yen per month, it's gradually cut down when the henchmen make a blunder or make their bosses mad, so they end up getting paid just 50,000 yen (approx. 405 US dollars), or at worse nothing at all every month. Their surnames are also the top three most common in Japan.

- Satō (voiced by Tomoyuki Morikawa)
  - The one at medium height, lives in a small apartment with his wife (called Nabeko) and their baby, from Tokushima prefecture and is enthusiastic about Awa dance—a local dance of his hometown. Holds the honor as the first person in the series to become a synthetic beast.
- Tanaka (voiced by Wataru Takagi)
  - The tallest of the three. He owns a house and lives with his wife and daughter. He's so honest and clean that he doesn't hesitate to sacrifice himself thinking about his family, sometimes volunteering to become a synthetic beast out of desperation. He's good at housework can even sew handmade dolls. He's also under a lot of mental pressure from his mother-in-law, who often asks when he'll become the president of Kuki Conglomerate, to such an extent that he even has nightmares about it.
- Suzuki (voiced by Tetsuya Iwanaga)
  - The shortest of the three, whose full name is Yasutaro Suzuki and is the only bachelor of the trio. He lives in a small, noisy apartment near a railroad track. In his childhood, he had a crush on a girl in his hometown named Shiratori, and ever since then he's had an obsession with knee-high socks and, when seeing a young girl wearing a pair, can't help but roll it down to the ankle (he calls that movement 'kutsushita kururun', sock roll), which makes him come across as a lolicon fan. He also has a 3rd dan in calligraphy, a 2nd dan in abacus, and a 4th dan in judo.

==== PC-ro ====
- Voiced by: Kōzō Shioya

A personal computer robot who first appears in the last half of episode 31, made by the Monster-Cooker from some computer parts and Rei's stuffed panda Pantaro that had been Rei's favorite doll since she'd been a toddler. He was created after an unsuccessful attempt to kidnap and brainwash Wapro. He speaks with a very fluent Kansai accent, always has a cigarette in his mouth, and is known for being sneaky, sly, and lecherous. He gives Rei the ability to merge with him to become a Hyper Onyomiko and is more than thrilled to see Rei naked when they merge. He also enjoys teasing Sato, Tanaka, and Suzuki at every opportunity. His name is a play on words PC (Japanese pronunciation: pee-shee, which was also a header given to the series number of NEC's PC series devices) and Shiro (a given name for Japanese males or for pets.)

==== Modam ====
- Voiced by: Bin Shimada

A nonentity from Planet Hero. He and his sister, E-Hub, were supposed to be banished to a planet with no civilization because of their evil hearts, and according to the rules of Planet Hero, their memories and their clothes were stripped and they were supposed to become the literal Adam and Eve of that planet, but on the way there they crash-landed on Earth, specifically Morisoba City. At first, they had no memories whatsoever, but like Adam and Eve, they regained them by eating a forbidden apple (a synthetic beast created by Raizo). Adam hid the fact that he had regained his memory and served Raizo, but gradually revealed his evil nature. He's a legitimate villain who plans to take over the world, superior to the Kukis in both fighting ability and brains. Even his synthetic beasts are more powerful than those created by them.

His name is a play on the words modem and Adam, and is modeled after Mobile Suit Zeta Gundam antagonist Paptimus Schirocco, who was played by the same voice actor.

==== E-Hub ====
- Voiced by: Megumi Hayashibara

A nonentity from Planet Hero, and Modam's younger sister. She's so high-handed and ruthless that she makes Rei look friendly and is strong and intimidating enough to make her tremble. Like her brother, she's a legitimate villain compared to the Kukis, but she has a more lighthearted side than Modam, like when she takes Raizo's interpretation of the prophecy book seriously, or when she gets in a heated rock-paper-scissors duel with Wonder Ibuki. Her name is a play on the words Ethernet hub and Eve.

=== Supporting Cast ===
==== Ebiten ====
- Voiced by: Masahiro Anzai

A small, fairy-like old man who serves as one of Agedama's guardians during his time on Earth. Though he looks like a silly old man in a rice bowl, he was once an active hero in his day, eventually passing down his old battle suit to Agedama. The name is a portmanteau of Ebisu (a member of Seven Lucky Gods) and ebi-tempura (shrimp tempura). He was one of the earliest characters created for the series, but he wasn't heavily redesigned like the protagonists were during the anime's production.

==== Okame ====
- Voiced by: Masako Miura

Ebiten's wife, an old fairy-like woman who has the body of a small jar and makes food for Agedama. She's usually very gentle, but when she gets angry, she becomes so scary that even Ebiten won't go near her. She can change her costume whenever she likes, and has appeared in race queen and swimsuit outfits.

Modeled directly after Okame (Noh mask: that of an ugly chubby woman used as a comedy relief between serious performances; its name origin is a Japanese word, kame (jar), since each of its plump cheek looks like a round shape a clay jar; nowadays it's known as the mascot of a natto brand called Okame Natto more than as the traditional mask.) One of the earliest characters created for the series, and while she had a similar shape, she was presented in artwork as human-sized with legs.

==== Uroncha ====
- Voiced by: Katsumi Suzuki

A suspicious-looking person named after oolong tea and wears Chinese clothing. Though he claims to be a 4th grader in Agedama's class, he looks like a middle-aged man. Despite being a frequent money-grubber, he's the only person at the school who remains neutral during the ongoing conflicts between Agedama/Ibuki and Rei. However, it's later revealed that he's also a native of Hero Planet and is a member of the Solar System branch of the Space Patrol, an object of admiration for all the children on that planet. Other members of the team include Habucha (herbal tea) and Jasmincha (jasmine tea), and all of them have the exact same face and voice. One of the earliest characters created for the series, but wasn't completely redesigned like the protagonists during the anime's production.

==== Kensaku Morikawa ====
- Voiced by: Tomoyuki Morikawa

The teacher in charge of Agedama's class. He always presents himself in a kendo uniform and appears to have the traditional Japanese spirit. When he was a student, he was the captain of a sumo club in school, weighed 100kg (220lbs). Nowadays, although he has a somewhat timid personality, he is very honest and shows more passion for teaching and education than anyone else. Even though he can't completely resist Rei's power, even he has standards and won't let her walk over him or anyone else. He also has strong feelings for his colleague and fellow teacher Hitomi Kirara. His character is modeled after Kensaku Morita.

==== Katsuo Harada ====
- Voiced by: Bin Shimada

The captain of Rei's bodyguards in Agedama's class, a fat kid who is often called "Tsuripan" (for his suspender shorts). Although he is still an elementary school student, he is the managing director of the Harada Real Estate Agency, a family-owned company run by his father. While he shows genuine professionalism during his work hours, at school he uses his power and connection to Rei to behave in an overbearing and unpleasant manner toward his classmates and other students throughout the school. He's only subservient to Rei because his family's business is connected to the Kuki Conglomerate, and in reality hates her as much as everyone else does. However, he's not a bad person and stays by Rei's side when the Kuki Conglomerate goes bankrupt and the other bodyguards bail on her.

==== Hitomi Kirara ====
- Voiced by: Wakana Yamazaki

A beautiful female teacher in East-Morisoba Elementary who Kensaku's got a huge crush on. Though the feelings are somewhat mutual, she prefers machismo, and Kensaku's timidity doesn't carry that weight. In the meantime, she's just nursing her emotions and waiting for the old-fashioned, straightforward teacher to toughen up and become wild. Ironically enough, she also seems to be dissatisfied with the weak position that women carry in society.

==== Kodama Heike ====
- Voiced by Satomi Kōrogi (in episode 6) → Ikue Ōtani (from episode 13 to the final)

Ibuki's younger brother who's a big fan of Agedaman. Although he's a young child who still takes baths with his older sister, he shares her inner strength. This is shown when he pretends to be a hero, known as "Agedaman No. 2", and attempts to take on the synthetic beast Batmanjuu. His foot size is 12.5 cm (5 inches), which he uses for the 12.5cm kick, a parody of the 16-Mon Kick, the nickname for Giant Baba's signature technique.

==== Hikari Yumenokōji ====
- Voiced by: Kappei Yamaguchi

A handsome, preppy boy from another school, known for his excellent grades and matching athletic skills. He becomes Agedama's rival once he captures Ibuki's attention during his track and field run. Though they don't really like each other, they are eventually shown to be a pretty good comedy duo during Morisoba City's comedy competition. He's based on an early antagonist concept that was used in the first manga and video game, Bifū Kunreikan, whose sister was Onyomiko. He and Rei were not only redesigned for the anime but they also aren't related, with only minimal interaction between the two, including the two coming close to being betrothed and then Hikari later getting kidnapped by her crew and being turned into a synthetic beast called "Brahamman".

=== Other characters ===
Yuri Shiratori
Voiced by: Yuri Shiratori
A childhood friend of Suzuki who he was in love with at one point. She is based on Taeko Okajima of the Studio Ghibli movie Only Yesterday and even has a scene that parodies the "climbing to the sunset sky" scene. She is also named after her voice actress.
The Principal
Voiced by: Junichi Sugawara
The useless principal of East-Morisoba Elementary School who regularly brown-noses school board chairman Raizo and his granddaughter Rei.
Vice Principal
Voiced by: Katsumi Suzuki
The vice principal of East-Morisoba Elementary School, who is an obsequious eduacator who keeps a low profile.
Hotaru Heike
Voiced by: Masako Miura
Ibuki's mother, who is as quick to laugh and giggle at even the worst of comedy as her daughter. Her name comes from "Japanese firefly" (heike-botaru).
Kanio Heike
Voiced by: Junichi Sugawara
Ibuki's father, an unremarkable businessman who lives in a small apartment with his family and dreams of owning a house. His name is from 'Samurai crab (heikegani)'
Yamabuki Heike
Voiced by: Sumi Shimamoto
A distant relative of Ibuki's family who resembles Raizo's late wife Kiku when she was young. Tsuripan's father offered him an arranged marriage, and when he saw a photo of her in a kimono, Raizo fell in love with her at first sight.
Kiku Kuki
Voiced by: Sumi Shimamoto
Raizo's late wife who Rei never knew because she died before she was born. Just after World War II, when a thief snatched a sack of rice that the young woman bought in a black market, Raizo caught the quick thief, knocked him out, and brought it back Kiku, which is how they met and eventually got married. Her name is an anagram of Kuki and means chrysanthemum.
Yoshio Harada
Voiced by: Yuu Shimaka
Tsuripan's equally overweight father and the president of the Harada Real Estate Agency. He's very loyal to Raizo as his agency is affiliated with Raizo's conglomerate. This fat man is also one of few people chosen to be an ingredient of a synthetic beast ingredient aside from the butlers.
The Owner of Ganko-Tei
Voiced by: Masahiro Anzai
A middle-aged man who runs the eponymous ramen shop, which Kensaku has visited since he was a student. The chef uses a special martial arts technique that he calls the "Noodle Bound", which he invented himself after some hard training in the Hida Mountains. The fighting maneuver consists of casting noodles against an opponent and binding the body, so the more the victim tries to get out of the knot the tighter they tangle.
Masumasu Yamanoki
Voiced by: Katsumi Suzuki
A middle-aged man in glasses who is also a so-called "professional food connoisseur". Agedama and his friends happen to see him every so often as another diner in Ganko-Tei. He is modeled after food and rakugo critic Masuhiro Yamamoto.
Mika
Voiced by: Chisa Yokoyama (in episode 6) → Kumiko Watanabe)
A young adult woman who's sometimes around when Agedaman and Onyomiko are duking it out in the city. She's dating a man named Katchi who she's deeply in love with, but is also very opinionated, which almost led to them breaking up. She is a parody of Rika Akana from Tokyo Love Story, a popular seinen romance manga at that time that had just been adapted into a TV drama.
Katchi
Voiced by: Bin Shimada
Mika's boyfriend, who's always with Rika. When the couple wants to hug, kiss, or show genuine intimacy around each other, the fighting lad Agedama and the evil lass Onyomiko somehow find a way to exchange blows around them and ruin their sweet moments. He is a spoof of Kanji Nagao, the main character of Tokyo Love Story.

== Episode list ==
No.	Title	Original release date
1	"It's the Light of Fighting Spirit, Agedaman!"; Transliteration: "Kiai no Hikari da Agedaman!" (Japanese: 気合の光だ あげだマン)	October 4, 1991
Agedama Genji transfers to the school attended by the studious Ibuki Heike and the haughty Rei Kuki, the only daughter of the Kuki family whose grandfather is Raizo Kuki, aka Notridamus XI. Agedama was ordered by his father to train and came to Earth from Planet Hero with the word-processing robot Wapro.
2	"The Town is Shaky!"; Transliteration: "Go Chōnai wa Gu〜ragura" (Japanese: ご町内はグ〜ラグラ)	October 11, 1991
Notridamus XI creates a burrowing synthetic beast that Rei uses to achieve victory in the school's marathon.
3	"Where There's Dust, There's a Dirty Trick!"; Transliteration: "Tatakeba Hokori no Warudakumi" (Japanese: 叩けばホコリの悪巧み)	October 18, 1991
Notridamus XI tries to collect all the dust in the town, his influence being a prophecy that says, "Those who have lost the dust will prostrate themselves before the earth..."
4	"The Janken Dog is a Kill Number!"; Transliteration: "Jan-ken-pon wa Koroshi no Bangō" (Japanese: 雀犬ポンは殺しの番号)	October 25, 1991
Notridamus XI believes that the best rock-paper-scissors player would conquer the world and creates a fusion of a sparrow and a dog.
5	"Cast Your Vote for Ibuki!"; Transliteration: "Ibuki ni Kyōki Ippyō o" (Japanese: いぶきに清き一票を!)	November 1, 1991
Agedama recommends Ibuki to run for student council president. However, she's disappointed by Rei's dirty election tactics.
6	"A Tree of Crabs, Crabs, Crabs"; Transliteration: "Kani Aru Ki da Kani Kani" (Japanese: カニある木だカニカニ)	November 8, 1991
Notridamus XI creates a crab-like tree to steal the legs of the townspeople.
7	"Neighborhood Dance Panic"; Transliteration: "Gochōnai Dansu Panikku" (Japanese: 御町内ダンスパニック)	November 15, 1991
When Rei finds out that Ibuki has been learning new types of dances, she suggests that they hold a contest to settle things.
8	"My True Feelings are Scary! I Hate Them!"; Transliteration: "Honne wa Kowai! Dai Kirai!" (Japanese: 本音はこわい!大嫌い)	November 22, 1991
Notridamus XI tries to take Japan for himself, and creates a synthetic beast by combining an octopus, a magnet, and a potted plant. Agedama and Ibuki also share an accidental kiss.
9	"Burn! Kensaku"; Transliteration: "Moeyo! Kensaku" (Japanese: 燃えよ!ケンサク)	November 29, 1991
Rei plots to revive the devil's heart from a single man's heart. Meanwhile, we learn that Kensaku-sensei has feelings for Hitomi-sensei.
10	"Hakushon's Great Annoyance"; Transliteration: "Hakushon Dai Meiwaku" (Japanese: ハクション大迷惑)	December 6, 1991
Notridamus XI tries to cause a great uprising by exploding peppers in the air. Then, Rei goes out into the town with the synthetic beast.
11	"An Extreme Battle for the Exclusive Story"; Transliteration: "Kageki ni Tokudane Gassen" (Japanese: 過激に特ダネ合戦)	December 13, 1991
Ibuki has officially become the student council president. Meanwhile, Rei wants to reclaim her popularity, so she makes her own commercial newspaper to compete with Ibuki's school newspaper.
12	"Cherry Blossom Snowstorm"; Transliteration: "Sakura Fubuki ga Omitōshi" (Japanese: 桜吹雪がお見通し)	December 20, 1991
Rei criticizes Kensaku-sensei for not scolding Ibuki when she is late or forgets something. Then, she goes crying to Notridamus XI, who then creates a synthetic beast that completely corrupts Ibuki's sweet nature.
13	"F1 Morisoba Grand Prix"; Transliteration: "F1 Morisoba Gurando Puri" (Japanese: F1盛蕎麦グランプリ)	December 27, 1991
After being humiliated in Harajuku, Rei wants to make her family's name known by inviting a popular racer to hold a Grand Prix.
14	"The School Play is a Harehireho"; Transliteration: "Gakugei-kai wa Harehireho" (Japanese: 学芸会はハレヒレホ)	January 10, 1992
Ibuki gets to play the role of Cinderella in the school play, but behind the scenes, Rei is hatching a scheme to upstage her.
15	"New Captain of the Guard Agedama"; Transliteration: "Shin Shin'eitaichō Agedama" (Japanese: 新親衛隊長あげだま)	January 17, 1992
Rei makes her own interpretation of "the meaning of the unsung hero" and creates a synthetic beast to change people's personalities. However, Rei finds herself caught up in this plan.
16	"The Smooth Snatcher"; Transliteration: "Suisui Sūtoru Sumibukurō" (Japanese: スイスイすー取る墨梟)	January 24, 1992
Agedama and his friends go to the skating rink. Ibuki is fascinated by Rei's gorgeous costume and performance. Agedama then tries to prove that he's equally talented.
17	"You're Too Dazzling, Hikari-kun"; Transliteration: "Mabushi Sugiru ze Hikari-kun" (Japanese: まぶしすぎるぜ 光君)	January 31, 1992
Agedama sees Ibuki happily talking with Hikari Yumenokōji, an athlete who is said to be a future Olympic candidate. Agedama becomes jealous as he now believes he has some serious competition for Ibuki's affection.
18	"Rei is a Yokozuna!"; Transliteration: "Rei wa Yokozuna de Gonsu" (Japanese: 麗は横綱でゴンス)	February 7, 1992
At school, everyone is excited about a story about two popular wrestling brothers. However, Rei, who doesn't know about the story, is hurt because she can't be the center of attention.
19	"I'm Cool in Your Eyes"; Transliteration: "Kimo no Hitomi ni Kūrakura" (Japanese: 君の瞳にクーラクラ)	February 14, 1992
Hikari applies to join the "Tapping Rouge Jellyfish Gang". Then Notridamus XI takes the opportunity to plot a marriage between Rei and Hikari to connect the Kuki family and the Yumenokōji family.
20	"A Dream House for 10,000 Yen"; Transliteration: "Yume no Ikkodate Ichi-man En" (Japanese: 夢の一戸建一万円)	February 21, 1992
Notridamus XI tries exploiting people's desire to buy their own homes. He sets a trap, and the Heike family gets caught in it, literally.
21	"Women are Fine on the Outside"; Transliteration: "On'na wa Genki de Soto ga Ii" (Japanese: 女は元気で外がイイ)	February 28, 1992
Rei was excited to be able to see her mother for the first time in six months, but she's unable to meet with her due to an urgent matter. So Notridamus XI created the synthetic beast, Tsumayoji, for her.
22	"Quiz, Quiz, Quiz!"; Transliteration: "Kuizu.Kuizu.Kuizu" (Japanese: クイズ.クイズ.クイズ)	March 6, 1992
Ibuki and Rei get 100 points on a test. However, Rei's not happy with them getting the same score, so she confronted their teacher and asked who was better, her or Ibuki.
23	"Time Tiger Bellah Slips"; Transliteration: "Taimu Tora Berā Suberu" (Japanese: タイム虎ベラーすべる)	March 13, 1992
Onyomiko is always defeated by Agedaman. Noticing this, Rei then realizes that it's important to know your enemy, so she watches videos of their previous battles to find his weaknesses.
24	"The Laughing Chow Chow"; Transliteration: "Warai Tocchauchau" (Japanese: 笑い取っチャウチャウ)	March 20, 1992
Notridamus XI creates a ridiculous synthetic beast, believing that taking away people's laughter is the shortest way to conquer the world.
25	"If It's Good, It's Filling."; Transliteration: "Umakerya Ponpoko" (Japanese: うまけりゃポンポコ)	March 27, 1992
Agedama discovers a popular, overcrowded ramen shop with an absurdly long line. The secret to its popularity seems to be that it was featured in a magazine, but another reason is the new volunteer Ibuki, whose cute appearance and friendly demeanor send people flocking to the shop.
26	"Wanted!? Agedaman"; Transliteration: "Shimei Tehai!? Agedaman" (Japanese: 指名手配!?あげだマン)	April 3, 1992
Agedaman is supposed to protect the peace of the town, but one day rumors spread that he's cracking into safes and stealing jewels. Meanwhile, Ibuki's younger brother, Kodama, tries to prove Agedaman's innocence.
27	"Dig Here, Ibuki"; Transliteration: "Koko Hore, Ibuki" (Japanese: ここ掘れ、いぶき)	April 10, 1992
Ibuki dreams of becoming a female archaeologist and wants to discover new things such as dinosaur fossils during outdoor lessons on ancient ruins excavation.
28	"Let's Make a Fanclub"; Transliteration: "Fankurabu o Tsukurō" (Japanese: ファンクラブを作ろう)	April 17, 1992
Ibuki and her friends form a fan club for Agedaman. Rei, who's not amused by this, forms a fan club for Onyomiko.
29	"Rei and Agedama, Living Together!?"; Transliteration: "Rei to Agedama Dōsei-chū!?" (Japanese: 麗とあげだま 同棲中!?)	April 24, 1992
Rei gets into a fight with Notridamus XI over tamagoyaki, which causes her to run out of the mansion, somehow rolling into Agedama's place.
30	"Romance, Cha Cha Cha"; Transliteration: "Romansu Cha Cha Cha" (Japanese: ロマンス チャチャチャ)	May 1, 1992
Notridamus XI is in a bad mood and is advised to go on a blind date. Agedaman is surprisingly enthusiastic about the idea because the woman Raizo is being matched with not only looks just like his late wife, but is also related to Ibuki. However, Rei is strongly against it.
31	"The Day Without Synthetic Beasts"; Transliteration: "Gōseijū ga Denai-hi" (Japanese: 合成獣が出ない日)	May 8, 1992
Agedaman is delighted to find a letter from Ibuki among the presents from his fans, saying that there's a present she wants to give to him in person.
32	"Laughing Hyper Onyomiko"; Transliteration: "Warau Haipā Onyomiko" (Japanese: 嗤うハイパー怨夜巫女)	May 15, 1992
Rei goes to school with PC-Ro, which she made to compete with Wapro. However, Wapro, now revealed to the public, becomes popular in class. This causes Rei to become jealous and turn off PC-Ro.
33	"Follow Me, Raizo"; Transliteration: "Raizō no Washi ni Tsuite Koi" (Japanese: 雷蔵の儂について来い)	May 22, 1992
Notridamus XI comes to observe a class at Morisoba Elementary School and says he would reform education by becoming the principal.
34	"I'm the Teacher Now"; Transliteration: "Wate ga Kyōshi Dasu" (Japanese: ワテが教師だす)	May 29, 1992
Continuing on his word to reform education, Notridamus XI insists that the teachers should also be educated. Rei takes to the podium as a special lecturer, and the teachers are then put to the test.
35	"Reading and Writing is a No-no"; Transliteration: "Yomikaki wa Dame yo" (Japanese: 読み書きはダメよ)	June 5, 1992
When Notridamus XI becomes so astonished by the poor handwriting of the school's children, PC-ro suggests that they abolish any type of written characters.
36	"The Salaryman Roars!"; Transliteration: "Sararīman Hoeru!" (Japanese: サラリーマン吼える!)	June 12, 1992
Raizo and Rei's trio of underpaid butlers, Sato, Suzuki, and Tanaka, take the time to enjoy a "peaceful" day without their masters.
37	"Cookie is a Whirlwind!"; Transliteration: "Kukkī wa Tsumujikaze!" (Japanese: クッキーはつむじ風!)	June 19, 1992
After a limousine incident gone wrong, Rei flies into the sky and crash lands into Agedama's house. Rei's now suffering from amnesia and her hair now covers her eyes, with no one sure of who she is. On the plus side, she's now friendly, approachable, and has a weird love for cookies for some reason.
38	"Our Ancestors Know Everything"; Transliteration: "Gosenso-sama wa Omitōshi" (Japanese: 御先祖様はお見通し)	June 26, 1992
PC-Ro reexamines the data of the previously failed missions and concludes that the prophecy that Raizo clings to is false.
39	"I Want Moneeeeey"; Transliteration: "Okane ga Hoshi〜ii" (Japanese: お金が欲し〜いッ)	July 3, 1992
Notridamus XI tries to issue a "ban on luxury" upon Rei and uses PC-ro to create a synthetic beast called Maru-U to keep a strict watch over her and take any money and credit cards she has. Rei is then forced to get a job at the local ramen shop.
40	"Who's the Orange Big Shot?"; Transliteration: "Dare ga Mikan no Taikiya-nen" (Japanese: 誰が未完の大器やねん)	July 10, 1992
When Notridamus XI and Rei go on a hot spring trip, Sato, Suzuki, and Tanaka steal the prophecy and read it to upstage their masters and rule the world themselves.
41	"You're a Bad Guy Too"; Transliteration: "Onushi mo Waru yo Nō" (Japanese: おヌシもワルよのう)	July 17, 1992
Taking influence from the television drama Mito Kōmon, Notridamus XI poses as the title character.
42	"Summer Vacation on a Southern Island"; Transliteration: "Minami no Shima de Natsuyasumi" (Japanese: 南の島で夏休み)	July 24, 1992
Notridamus XI, worried about what would happen after he conquered the world, bought a deserted island to train Rei as his successor and have her study the art of rulership.
43	"Call Me Queen!"; Transliteration: "Watashi o Joō-sama to Oyobi!" (Japanese: 私を女王様とお呼び!)	July 31, 1992
Agedama and his friends are exiled from Reisama Island after they refuse to become residents and be controlled by Rei.
44	"Because You're So Blue"; Transliteration: "Kimi ga Tottemo Aoi kara" (Japanese: 君がとっても青いから)	August 7, 1992
Rei is having trouble with her summer vacation research project. She is then inspired by the words in the prophecy that say "The homework assigned to the future is to revive the blueness of the Earth".
45	"Raizo, Fall Down Seven Times, Stand Up Eight"; Transliteration: "Raizō, Nana Korobi Yaoki" (Japanese: 雷蔵、七転び八起き)	August 14, 1992
Rei's parents have suffered major financial losses and the Kuki Conglomerate has faced with the misfortune of bankruptcy. Now, Rei and Raizo must move into one of their butlers' homes for a while.
46	"The King of Terror Appears!"; Transliteration: "Kyō no Daiō, Arawaru!" (Japanese: 恐怖の大王、現る!)	August 21, 1992
An earthquake causes a huge hole to appear in the schoolyard of Morisoba Elementary School. Two naked figures appear from the hole along with a ball of light.
47	"I'm, Actually Onyomiko!"; Transliteration: "Watakushi, Jitsu wa Onyomiko!" (Japanese: 私、じつは怨夜巫女!)	August 28, 1992
The brother and sister Modam and E-hub awaken, destined to rule the world. Meanwhile, Agedama has a certain dream and feels a sense of impending doom...
48	"The Mysterious Duo of Justice and Evil"; Transliteration: "Seigi to Aku no Mei Konbi" (Japanese: 正義と悪の迷コンビ)	September 4, 1992
Rei and Agedama find out each other's true identities and proceed to clash. However, they are forced to work together to take on Modam and E-hub.
49	"It's Ibuki's Turn"; Transliteration: "Ibuki-chan Deban desu" (Japanese: いぶきちゃん出番です)	September 11, 1992
The prophecy that Modam and E-hub obtain proclaims that "a new superhuman with unknown powers will appear and confront the ruler". Ibuki then transforms into a superhero, going by the title of Wonder Ibuki.
50	"Agedama in Dire Straits!"; Transliteration: "Agedama Zettai Zetsumei!" (Japanese: あげだま絶体絶命!)	September 18, 1992
Trouble is brewing when it's revealed that Rei's parents have been captured by Modam and E-hub. As Rei tries to rescue them, Agedama and Ibuki offer to help.
51	"A Gift From Space"; Transliteration: "Uchū kara no Okurimono" (Japanese: 宇宙からの贈り物)	September 25, 1992
Uroncha appears and reveals that he's a member of the Space Patrol of Planet Hero. However, he and his similar-looking cohorts fall under the control of the evil siblings. Agedaman, Onyomiko, and Super Ibuki (formerly Wonder Ibuki) are now being put through the fight of their lives to save the world. After the battle, Agedama and Wapro hitch a ride with the space patrol, as their break has ended. Agedama then reassures both Ibuki and Rei that he'll return once his next break starts.

== Music ==
=== Theme songs ===
- "Opening Theme 1: Jinsei Madamada Agedaman" (from episode 1 to 26)
  - Lyrics by: Yūko Ōtomo
  - Composed by: Toshihiko Sahashi
  - Arranged by: Toshihiko Sahashi
  - Sung by：Kaori Honma (later known as Kaori Futenma)

Not officially translated, means 'You've got a long way to go, Agedaman.' The lyrics has nothing to do with the anime's stories.

- "Opening theme 2: Jishin Manman Agedaman" (from episode 27 to the final)
  - Lyrics by: Mitsuko Shiramine
  - Composed by: Toshihiko Sahashi
  - Arranged by: Toshihiko Sahashi
  - Sung by: Nozomu Sasaki

Means 'Gutsy Agedaman.' Agedaman's theme song, the voice actor sings himself in a lower key.

- "Closing Theme 1: Sekai wa Watashi no Tameni" (from episode 1 to 26)
  - Lyrics by: Yūko Ōtomo
  - Composed by: Toshihiko Sahashi
  - Arranged by: Toshihiko Sahashi
  - Sung by: Kaori Honma (later known as Kaori Futenma)

Means 'The World Is Dedicated to Me.' One of Rei's theme songs, a teenage pop singer who just debuted that year, Kaori Honma (later changed her stage name to the real one, Kaori Futenma) sings the villainess' ambition, to conquer the world. In the animation, Rei is taking a bubble bath.

- "Closing Theme 2: Kanzenmuketsu no Jōō-sama" (from episode 27 to the final)
  - Lyrics by: Mitsuko Shiramine
  - Composed by: Toshihiko Sahashi
  - Arranged by: Toshihiko Sahashi
  - Sung by：Sakiko Tamagawa with Tomoyuki Morikawa, Wataru Takagi and Tetsuya Iwanaga (chatter)

Means 'Absolute Queen.' Another theme song for Rei, the voice actress sings herself going out of mind. The butlers grumble after she brag about herself. At the end of the song, Rei laughs crazily and Tanaka butts in and tells her "An ambulance has come!"

=== Featured song ===
- "Chikyū wo Todokeyō" (from episode 49 to the final)
  - Lyrics by: Mitsuko Shiramine
  - Composed by: Toshihiko Sahashi
  - Arranged by: Toshihiko Sahashi
  - Sung by：Nozomu Sasaki

Means 'Send from Earth.' Used in the showdown with Modam and E-Hub, friends and other people on earth sing this song to send energies to Agedaman in a pinch. Kotono Mitsuishi, who plays Ibuki, sings this song, too, her version was just meant for use in Ibuki's fight scene in episode 49, thus, is not a full-length song.

== Staff ==
- Pre-production Writers: Sukehiro Tomita, Akira Sakuma
- Draft Scenario Writer: Oji Hiroi
- Draft Character Designer: Kennosuke Mizutani
- Executive Producer: Yoshibumi Sugisawa
- Director: Masato Namiki
- Character Designer, Animation Director: Hatsuki Tsuji
- Animation Supervisor: Tadashi Kudo
- Cinematographers: Hiroaki Edamitsu→Katsuya Kozutsumi
- Music Composer: Toshihiko Sahashi
- Director of Audiography: Kazuo Harada
- Producers: Shinsuke Kuramochi (TV Tokyo), Yutaka Sugiyama (Nihon Ad Systems), Akio Wakana (Studio Gallop)
- Frame Drawing Studios: Thumbtack Kikaku, Nakamura Production, Bunsei Animation, Animal-Ya, Wombat, Film Magic, Studio Musashi
- Background Illustrator: Kobayashi Production
- Color Coordinators: Yukitaka Shishikai, Naoko Kodama
- Cel Painting Studios: Studio Marin, Sendai Animation, Onion Production, Bunsei Animation, Dong Woo Animation, Oscar Kikaku
- Camera Operators/Best Boys: Yasunori Hayama, Katsuya Kozutsumi, Hisao Kazayama, Tōru Kobayashi, Hiroshi Nakatomi, Yasuhiro Shimizu, Hiroshi Tamura, Kenji Akazawa, Satoshi Arakawa, Yoshiaki Tsutsui, Yutaka Hasegawa, Ayako Īri, Hideo Kikukawa, Akira Kato
- Recording Engineers: Takeshi Seyama, Hiroshi Adachi
- Logo Designing Company: Maki Production
- Film Developer: Tokyo Laboratory ltd.
- Sound Effects Creator: Top Sound
- Foley Artist: Mitsuru Kageyama (Fizz Sound Creation)
- Music Supervisor: Hisashi Kawai
- Mix Engineer: Fujio Yamada
- Assistant Director: Naoko Yagi
- Recording Studio: New Japan Studio
- Managers: Masaru Wakita (TV Tokyo,) Yoshio Ōtsuka (Studio Gallop)
- Writers' Assistant: Hiroshi Tsuruta
- Line Producer: Hiroshi Oyama
- Production Assistants: Hiroshi Ōsawa, Noriyuki Mitsuhashi, Yasuhiro Geshi, Hiroshi Oyama, Yoshito Kuwa, Ryōki Kamitsubo
- Gofer: Sachiko Nakazumi
- PR Manager: Mari Itō (TV Tokyo)
- Technical Adviser: Ryōsuke Takahashi
- Mandy Actors: Arts Vision
- Animation Creator: Studio Gallop
- Broadcaster: TV Tokyo

Preceded by Tokimeki Ōen TV (talk show) (April 5th 1991 - September 27th 1991)	TV Tokyo Friday 18:00-18:30 Timeframe Genji Tsūshin Agedama (October 4th 1991 – September 25th 1992)	Succeeded by Hime-chan's Ribbon (anime) (October 2th 1992 - December 3rd 1993)
