= Mamono Hunter Yōko: Dai 7 no Keishō =

1991 Japanese video game

- Developer: Klon
- Publisher: Masaya
- Series: Devil Hunter Yohko
- Platform: Sega Mega Drive
- Release: JP: March 22, 1991
- Genre: Platform game
- Mode: Single-player

Mamono Hunter Yōko: Dai 7 no Keishō (魔物ハンター妖子 第7の警鐘) is a platform game developed by Klon and published by NCS Masaya for the Sega Mega Drive in 1991 exclusively in Japan. It is an adaptation of the manga and anime series Devil Hunter Yohko.

== Gameplay ==
Mamono Hunter Yoko is a side-scrolling platform game in which the players take the role of the titular protagonist Yoko, who is armed with a sword. If the attack button is held, Yoko's sword will create a protective shield around her, which can also be thrown at enemies, but the projectiles can break their way through the shield if it receives consistent damage. Players are given a life bar that drops when Yoko receives damage, then slowly regenerates. There are intro and cut scenes between levels.

== Reception ==
The game received mixed reviews, including being rated 46% by German magazine PowerPlay and 88% by French magazine Joystick.
