= Devil Hunter Yohko =

Anime series by Madhouse

魔物ハンター妖子 (Mamono Hantā Yōko)
- Genre: Action, comedy, horror
- Original video animation
- Directed by: Katsuhisa Yamada (#1, 4); Hisashi Abe (#2–3); Jun'ichi Sakata (#5); Akiyuki Shinbo (#6)
- Written by: Sukehiro Tomita (#1); Hisaya Takabayashi (#2); Katsuhisa Yamada (#3); Tatsuhiko Urahata (#5–6)
- Music by: Hiroya Watanabe (#1–5); Toshiyuki Omori (#2–3, #6)
- Studio: Madhouse
- Licensed by: NA: ADV Films
- Released: December 1, 1990 – July 1, 1995
- Runtime: 30–45 minutes (each)
- Episodes: 6
- Manga
- Written by: Gaku Miyao
- Published by: Shōnen Gahōsha
- Imprint: YK Comics
- Magazine: Young King OURs
- Original run: 1995 – 1996
- Volumes: 1

Devil Hunter Yohko (Japanese: 魔物ハンター妖子, Hepburn: Mamono Hantā Yōko) is a Japanese original video animation series created by Madhouse, produced by Toho, and released in North America by ADV Films as their first release. The series was first released on December 1, 1990, and ended on July 1, 1995. It is about a sixteen-year-old girl named Yohko Mano, voiced by Aya Hisakawa, who banishes demons from the Earth.

An English dubbed version of the series was also released. The six-episode series was adapted into several video games by Masaya.

== Plot ==
For centuries, the Mano family has been slaying demons. Yohko's grandmother, Madoka, is the 107th Devil Hunter, and Yohko's mother, Sayoko, would have been the 108th, but for a small hitch: A Devil Hunter must be a virgin to take on the power and responsibility. Sayoko became pregnant before Madoka could reveal the family's secrets, and so the job fell to Yohko. Now the 108th Devil Hunter, Yohko must face off against demons while trying to live her life as a boy-crazy schoolgirl.

== Characters ==
- Yohko Mano (真野 妖子 Mano Yōko)
  Voiced by: Aya Hisakawa (Japanese); Amanda Winn-Lee (English): The heroine of the anime. Her grandmother gives Yohko the responsibility to be the 108th Devil Hunter and continue their family's legacy of Devil Hunters. She now fights as a Devil Hunter against demons that appear and interrupt her life and ruin her chances of ever getting with the guy of her dreams. In part 1, she was drawn with a lot of detail, giving her a mature look. By part 6, less detail and a younger look were used. In the dub, she speaks with a heavy Valley Girl accent.
- Azusa Kanzaki (神崎 あづさ Kanzaki Azusa)
  Voiced by: Konami Yoshida (Japanese); Kimberly Yates (English): A sidekick, or apprentice under Yohko. She is a Devil Hunter in training. Azusa is from a mountain village and came down seeking Yohko to be trained. Although she is not a skilled fighter and can be a klutz, Azusa fights alongside Yohko where she can and continues to learn to become just like her master, Yohko. Azusa wears a Youma bracelet instead of the traditional Youma ring that Yohko possesses and she wields the Spear of Fuma in combat.
- Madoka Mano (真野 マドカ Mano Madoka)
  Voiced by: Yūji Mitsuya (Japanese); Sharon Shawnessey (English): Grandmother to Yohko Mano and mother of Sayoko Mano, Yohko's mother. She was the former 107th Devil Hunter but now is too old to continue being a Devil Hunter, although she still has some skill and fight in her. She passes the title of Devil Hunter to Yohko to continue the family legacy.
- Sayoko Mano (真野 小夜子 Sayoko Mano)
  Voiced by: Hiromi Tsuru (Japanese); Carol Amerson (English): Daughter of Madoka Mano and mother to Yohko Mano. She was supposed to be the 108th Devil Hunter but became pregnant with Yohko (Only virgins can become Devil Hunters). She had a very frank and open opinion on sex and even gave Yohko a package of condoms in the first episode. This attitude, like most things in the series, was later toned down greatly in subsequent episodes.
- Chikako Ogawa (小川 千賀子 Ogawa Chikako)
  Voiced by: Chieko Honda (Japanese); Tiffany Grant (English): Yohko's best friend. Chi (her nickname) seems to have an extensive information gathering network and tends to know about most of the events going on at the school. She usually supplies Yohko with info (sometimes pictures) on the most handsome guys. She employs herself as Yohko's "manager" and assists Yohko where she can, although she does tend to get caught in the line of fire.

=== Secondary characters ===
- Osamu Wakabayashi
  Voiced by: Kappei Yamaguchi: A friend and admirer of Yohko, he gets used by the demons in the first OVA in an attempt to prevent her from becoming a Devil Hunter.
- Haruka Mano (真野 ハルカ Mano Haruka)
  Voiced by: Noriko Hidaka (Japanese); Sue Ulu (English): The first Devil Hunter from the Mano Family. She is very skilled as a Devil Hunter and is able to fend and defeat any demon, even the most powerful of all demons, Yujiro Tasugaru. In several artworks, she is portrayed with a white Devil Hunter outfit with pink hair. In the anime however, she wears a red Devil Hunter outfit and has light green hair.
- Yujiro Tasugaru
  Voiced by: Kenji Nomura: The strongest of all demons, Yujiro is one of the first formidable demons and enemy of the Mano Family, being an oni-looking humanoid muscle demon and wearing a monster face on his back. Yujiro is very powerful and has the ability to manipulate time and space. He was responsible for allowing demons to enter the human world and almost brought the world to the brink of hell, until the first Devil Hunter, Haruka Mano, defeated and sealed him. Every generation, Yujiro manages to free himself, only to be beaten and sealed again by that generation's Devil Hunter. Not only is he extremely powerful, he is extremely clever and cunning.
- Chiaki Mano
  Voiced by: Shigeru Chiba: Twin sister of Madoka Mano and Grandmother to Ayako Mano. Chiaki competed against Madoka to see which of the two would hold the title of the 107th Devil Hunter. Chiaki lost to her sister and because of this, she grew bitter of Madoka and left the family house, stealing the Whip of Destruction in the process. She now trains Ayako and Azusa 2 to defeat the 108th Devil Hunter, Yohko Mano, to prove that Ayako is the true 108th Devil Hunter.
- Ayako Mano
  Voiced by: Aya Hisakawa: Granddaughter of Chiaki Mano and cousin to Yohko Mano. She was trained by Chiaki Mano to defeat Yohko and become the true 108th Devil Hunter. Ayako shares a very similar appearance to Yohko, thus making them look like twins. However, Ayako has lighter hair and her eyes are a bit more narrow than Yohko's, and her Devil Hunter uniform is black, not red. She is the wielder of the Whip of Destruction, which she uses at its full potential. Together with Azusa 2, she had planned to take the Devil Hunter title from Yohko and claim it as her own. However, they joined forces to fight a very powerful demon, one Ayako had accidentally released, which temporarily shook her confidence. Afterwards, Ayako decided she needed more training and left to improve herself, parting with her cousin on more amiable terms.
- Azusa 2: Sidekick to Ayako Mano. She looks very much like Azusa Kanzaki. Since she never mentioned her actual name, Madoka dubs her with the name "Azusa 2". She is very much like Azusa, both in appearance and in skill, which means that she too is a klutz at times and not very skilled in fighting. She does seem to have a bit more experience in combat, although not much of a difference compared to Azusa Kanzaki.

== Episodes ==
No.	Title	Directed by (Note: Information is taken from the ending credits of each episode.)	Written by	Storyboarded by	Original release date
1	"Monster Hunter Yohko"; Transliteration: "Mamono Hunter Yohko" (Japanese: 魔物ハンター妖子)	Katsuhisa Yamada (Note: Assisted by Keitarou Motonaga.)	Sukehiro Tomita	-	December 1, 1990
Yohko Mano is introduced. Yohko goes about her daily life; day dreaming about a cute guy named Hideki. Yohko learns that her family has a long history of being devil hunters. But this time the demons decide to take out the next devil hunter before she can fight back. After a failed attempt to take Yohko's virginity (so that she can't become a devil hunter), the demons decide to use Hideki as bait. Yohko must become the 108th devil hunter and rescue the man of her dreams. Note: The English-dubbed "Special Edition" of this episode restores approximately 30 seconds of assorted footage that was cut from the final Japanese print of the film.
2	"Devil Hunter Yohko 2"; Transliteration: "Mamono Hunter Yohko 2" (Japanese: 魔物ハンター妖子2)	Katsuhisa Yamada; Hisashi Abe (animator)	Hisaya Takabayashi	Kazunari Kume	December 22, 1992
Yohko trains to become a good devil hunter. Nearby a local construction site destroys a forest in which sleeping spirits lie. The spirits are disturbed by this and start harassing the construction workers. Azusa Kanzaki, a Devil Hunter in training, is introduced. Azusa came to become an apprentice to Yohko. The two team up to fight against the spirits that are harassing the workers.
3	"Devil Hunter Yohko 3"; Transliteration: "Mamono Hunter Yohko 3" (Japanese: 魔物ハンター妖子3)	Katsuhisa Yamada; Hisashi Abe	Katsuhisa Yamada	Hisashi Abe	April 11, 1993
Yohko has a dream about a man named Master Biryu. Yohko is transported to another dimension and learns that Biryu has been imprisoned. Yohko learns that she must save Master Biryu (although she develops a crush on him). Meanwhile, Azusa saw Yohko disappear and attempts to get Yohko back with Yohko's friend, Chi. They manage to get to where Yohko is, but fail and manage to get themselves back where they started. She must fight the demon holding Master Biryu captive in order to free him.
4	"Devil Hunter Yohko 4-Ever"; Transliteration: "Super Music Clip" (Japanese: スーパー ミュージック クリップ)	Katsuhisa Yamada; Yasuhiro Kuroda (4.3); Genrou Tanaka (4.45); Tatsuyoshi Yamazawa (4.45)	-	Katsuyuki Kodera (4.3)	December 21, 1993
A tribute to Devil Hunter Yohko, with a collection of music videos. These videos feature songs from the series (including three new songs), put to scenes from the anime, colored manga picture, an original animated video featuring chibified versions of Yohko and Azusa, and two live videos.
5	"Hell on Earth"; Transliteration: "Kouin Haou no Ran" (Japanese: 光陰覇王の乱)	Junichi Sakata	Tatsuhiko Urahata	-	July 1, 1994
Madoka, Yohko's grandmother, senses the return of Tokima: the demon who from the time of the first devil hunter has been the enemy of the Mano family, is approaching. Tokima appears and possesses Ryuichi Asakura, a man whom Yohko has a crush on. Tokima tricks Yohko and gets near the clock that keeps his power sealed, but is repelled by special talismans. The next day, Madoka ends up with her past youthful body! Tokima possesses Azusa, who takes the clock. Yohko fights Azusa to try to stop her from destroying the clock. Yohko is tricked and "killed". The clock is destroyed and the demon's power released. Yohko is taken to the time of the very first Devil Hunter, Haruka Mano. The two go back into the present and fight against Tokima.
6	"Double Jeopardy"; Transliteration: "Yohko x 2 (Squared)" (Japanese: 妖子×2(二乗))	Akiyuki Shinbo	Tatsuhiko Urahata	Akiyuki Shinbo; Kouichi Ishihara	July 1, 1995
Ayako Mano, who is nearly identical in appearance to Yohko, is introduced; she has spent her life training and honing her abilities so that one day she may defeat Yohko and become the devil hunter of the Mano family, and now she is ready for the final confrontation. Yohko continues to live her life and is unaware of Ayako until she starts stealing away every guy that on whom Yohko has a crush. Then one night while taking a bath, Yohko hears something outside and gives chase. She then meets up with an Azusa look-alike. She and Ayako attack the unsuspecting Yohko with crushing attacks, while Yohko parries the onslaught. The fight stops, but Ayako vows to finish it. Madoka reveals a certain part of her past that relates to the encounter. Yohko's teacher, whom she has a crush on, is used as bait to lure Yohko. Ayako and Yohko meet face-to-face for the showdown. The fight awakens a demon who sleeps deep within the Earth and the two must learn to fight together to fend off this powerful creature.

== Theme music ==
- Episode 1 End Theme: "Go, Go! Love Coup (Koi de Coup d'État Go Go; 恋のクーデター・ゴーゴー)" by Aya Hisakawa
- Episode 2 End Theme: "Not So Fast, Sexy Girl (Tokoro ga Dokkoi! Sexy Musume; ところがどっこい! セクシー娘)" by Kaori Honma
- Episode 3 End Theme: "So Bad Boy" by Aya Hisakawa
- Episode 5 End Theme: "I Like the Way I Don't Give Up on Myself (Ganbaru Watashi ga Suki; 頑張る私が好き)" by Aya Hisakawa
- Episode 6 End Theme: "Touch My Heart" by Aya Hisakawa

== Release ==
Devil Hunter Yohko was ADV Films' first VHS release, on December 15, 1992. ADV co-founder Matt Greenfield said the reason Yohko was chosen as the first release was because "we wanted something that was really very unique, that people were going to say 'Whoa! What was that?', because at the time no one in the US had seen anything like this." Toho reluctantly licensed Devil Hunter Yohko to ADV, making the title ADV's first; even though Shozo Watanabe, the general manager of the Los Angeles office of Toho, expressed concern that ADV would not be able to handle the distribution of the film, Toho was unable to find another distributor, so it selected ADV. The story was adapted into a manga by Gaku Miyao. The anime was re-released on DVD in 2002, commemorating the tenth anniversary of its original release by ADV.

Toho released a Blu-ray box set of the OVA series on July 20, 2022.

== Video games ==
The series was adapted into several video games by Masaya (a division of NCS Corporation):

- Mamono Hunter Yōko: Dai 7 no Keishō (1991) for the Sega Mega Drive.
- Mamono Hunter Yōko: Makai kara no Tenkōsei (1992) for the PC Engine.
- Mamono Hunter Yōko: Tooki Yobigoe (1993) for the PC Engine.
