= True Love Story =

- Genre: Simulation
- Developer: ASCII
- Platforms: PlayStation; PlayStation 2

True Love Story (トゥルー・ラブストーリー, Turū Rabusutōrī) is a series of four dating sims. True Love Story and True Love Story 2 were released by ASCII for the PlayStation. True Love Story 3 and True Love Story: Summer Days, and yet... were released by Enterbrain for the PlayStation 2.

The True Love Story land are notable for their gekō (下校), or walk-home system. When the player asks a girl to walk home with him from school, the game enters a special conversation mode. In this mode, in addition to the usual long-term, strategic "love meter", the girl you are conversing with has a short-term, tactical "heartthrob meter" representing her level of immediate interest in the conversation with you. The player is given the choice of approximately 30 topics of conversation to choose from, and the heartthrob meter will increase or decrease based on the appropriateness of his selections. High heartthrob can then be leveraged to ask the girl out on a date, or simply to effect a permanent increase in her love meter.

Later True Love Story games added further complexity to this system, such as a "combo" system measuring the number of consecutive good choices of conversation topics. In large part because of this system, True Love Story is one of the most gameplay-rich dating sims.

An OVA based on the True Love Story; Summer Days, and yet... story was released in 2003. It was 3 episodes long.

== Games ==
There have been 6 installments in the True Love Story. The PlayStation installments were published by ASCII, while the PlayStation 2 installments were released by Enterbrain.

=== Main series ===
- True Love Story (PS: 1996, re-released on 1998): Player is a high school student who can pursue 9 heroines.
- True Love Story 2 (PS: 1999): Player can pursue 13 heroines, including his sister.
- True Love Story 3 (PS2: 2001, re-released on 2003): Player can pursue 10 heroines, including his twin sister.
- True Love Story: Summer Days, and yet... (PS2: 2003, re-released on 2004): The only title of the series with an anime adaptation.
  - Natsuko Kuwatani sung the opening theme of the OVA, Sweet Connection.

=== Fandiscs ===
- True Love Story ~Remember My Heart~ (PS: 1997): Remake for the original game featuring an enhanced interface and new heroines.
- True Love Story Fandisc (PS: 1999): A short game featuring two new heroines; a pair of twin sisters.
