= Animaze =

American audio production company

Animaze.. iNC
- Industry: Anime dubbing
- Founded: 1992
- Defunct: 2014
- Fate: Defunct
- Key people: Kevin Seymour (founder)

Animaze.. iNC was an American production company known for producing English language dubs for many high-profile anime series, such as Cowboy Bebop, Trigun, Code Geass, and Wolf's Rain, and video games, such as Xenosaga Episode I: Der Wille zur Macht and the .hack series. It was also known for its work on anime films such as Ghost in the Shell and the redub of Akira. The company was founded by Kevin Seymour, formerly of U.S. Renditions. The company cease production in 2010, then closed when Kevin Seymour died in 2014.

== Production list ==
=== Anime ===
- Ah! My Goddess: The Movie (Pioneer-Geneon)
- Ambassador Magma (Dark Image Entertainment/Manga)
- The Adventures of Mini-Goddess (Pioneer-Geneon)
- Akira (Pioneer-Geneon)
- Appleseed (Pioneer-Geneon)
- Armitage III (Pioneer-Geneon)
- The Big O (Bandai Entertainment)
- Bastard!! (Geneon)
- Battle Athletes (Pioneer-Geneon)
- Black Heaven (Pioneer-Geneon)
- Black Jack OVA (Central Park Media)
- Black Jack The Movie (Manga Entertainment)
- Black Magic M-66 (Manga Entertainment)
- Catnapped! (Pioneer-Geneon)
- Code Geass (Bandai Entertainment)
- Cowboy Bebop (Bandai Entertainment)
- Cowboy Bebop: The Movie (Destination Films/Sony Pictures Home Entertainment)
- Cyborg 009 (2001 series) (Avex/Sony Pictures Home Entertainment)
- Dual! Parallel Trouble Adventures (Pioneer-Geneon)
- El Hazard (Pioneer-Geneon)
- Fist of the North Star (Manga Entertainment)
- Fushigi Yugi (Pioneer-Geneon)
- Gate Keepers (Pioneer-Geneon)
- Giant Robo (L.A. Hero/Manga Entertainment)
- Ghost in the Shell (Bandai Visual/Manga Entertainment)
- Ghost in the Shell 2: Innocence (Bandai Entertainment)
- Ghost in the Shell: Stand Alone Complex (Bandai Entertainment/Manga Entertainment)
- Ghost in the Shell: Stand Alone Complex: Solid State Society (Bandai Entertainment/Manga Entertainment)
- Guyver (L.A. Hero/Manga Entertainment)
- Hand Maid May (Pioneer-Geneon)
- .hack//Liminality (Bandai Games)
- Hyper Doll (Pioneer-Geneon)
- Kikaider (Bandai Entertainment)
- The Legend of Black Heaven (Pioneer-Geneon)
- Lupin III: The Castle of Cagliostro (Manga Entertainment)
- Macross II (L.A. Hero)
- Macross Plus (Manga Entertainment)
- Metropolis (Sony Pictures)
- Mobile Suit Gundam: The Movie Trilogy (Bandai Entertainment)
- Mobile Suit Gundam 0080: War in the Pocket (Bandai Entertainment)
- Mobile Suit Gundam 0083: Stardust Memory (Bandai Entertainment)
- Mobile Suit Gundam: The 08th MS Team (Bandai Entertainment)
- Moldiver (Pioneer-Geneon)
- Ninja Scroll (Manga Entertainment)
- Ninku (Media Blasters)
- Outlanders (Dark Image Entertainment)
- Outlaw Star (Bandai Entertainment)
- Orguss 02 (Manga Entertainment)
- Perfect Blue (Manga Entertainment)
- Phantom Quest Corp. (Pioneer-Geneon)
- Resident Evil: Degeneration (Sony Pictures Home Entertainment)
- Saber Marionette J Again (Bandai Entertainment)
- Serial Experiments Lain (Pioneer-Geneon)
- Sol Bianca: The Legacy (Pioneer-Geneon)
- Street Fighter Alpha (Manga Entertainment)
- Street Fighter II: The Movie (Manga Entertainment)
- Street Fighter II V (Manga Entertainment)
- The Super Dimension Century Orguss (L.A. Hero)
- The Wings of Honneamise (Bandai Visual/Manga Entertainment)
- They Were 11 (Central Park Media)
- Trigun (Pioneer-Geneon)
- Tsukikage Ran (Bandai Entertainment)
- Wolf's Rain (Bandai Entertainment)
- Yukikaze (Bandai Entertainment)
- YuYu Hakusho: The Movie (Media Blasters)

=== Video games ===
- Ace Combat 5: The Unsung War (Bandai Namco Games)
- Ace Combat Zero: The Belkan War (Bandai Namco Games)
- The Bouncer (Square Enix)
- Brave Fencer Musashi (Square Enix)
- Breakdown (Namco)
- Bushido Blade 2 (Square Enix)
- Castlevania: Curse of Darkness (Konami)
- Castlevania: Lament of Innocence (Konami)
- Castlevania: The Dracula X Chronicles (Konami)
- Death by Degrees (Bandai Namco Games)
- Drakengard (Square Enix)
- Dragon Ball GT: Final Bout (Bandai Namco Games)
- Final Fantasy XI (Square Enix)
- Firefighter F.D.18 (Konami)
- Front Mission 4 (Square Enix)
- Galerians: Ash (Sammy Studios)
- Grandia III (Square Enix)
- .hack//Infection (Bandai Namco Games)
- .hack//Mutation (Bandai Namco Games)
- .hack//Outbreak (Bandai Namco Games)
- .hack//Quarantine (Bandai Namco Games)
- Nano Breaker (Konami)
- Phase Paradox (SCEI)
- Resident Evil Outbreak File 2 (Capcom)
- Rumble Roses XX (Konami)
- Silent Bomber (Bandai Namco Games)
- Silent Hill (Konami)
- Star Ocean: Till the End of Time (Square Enix)
- Suikoden IV (Konami)
- Suikoden V (Konami)
- Suikoden Tactics (Konami)
- Xenosaga Episode I: Der Wille zur Macht (Bandai Namco Games)
