= List of Macross Plus albums =

This is a list of albums for the anime OVA series Macross Plus. The series has been described as needing "an extremely strong score to support the plot about the rise of a popular singing idol who turns out to be a computer generated Artificial Intelligence". This is none other than Sharon Apple, whose music itself is featured in the series. There are four albums: two soundtracks and two albums featuring the songs of Sharon Apple. All four albums were first released in Japan beginning in October 1994 up through November 1995. Macross Plus Soundtrack and Macross Plus Soundtrack II have also been released in the United States by AnimeTrax.

Macross Plus features the work of renowned Japanese musician and composer Yoko Kanno. While Please Save My Earth was the first anime series that she composed for, her work on Macross Plus has tended to overshadow the former. Kanno's Macross Plus compositions have been described as seeming "to be written in a far future or a distant galaxy," yet still retain their listener appeal. Kanno has stated that several of the songs such as "SANTI-U" and "Pulse" do not feature actual languages, but rather sound like them. She has also described Macross Plus executive director Shoji Kawamori as not being very detailed when it came to musical instruction.

== Macross Plus Original Soundtrack ==
Macross Plus Original Soundtrack

Studio album by Yoko Kanno
- Released: (Japan) October 21, 1994 (United States) 1995
- Recorded: 1993–1994
- Genre: Anime soundtrack
- Length: 52:27
- Label: Victor
- Producer: Shiro Sasaki

Macross Plus Original Soundtrack is the first soundtrack for the OVA series and the sole soundtrack on which vocalist Mai Yamane makes an appearance. It features three vocal tracks. "After, in the Dark" which is sung by Yamane is the ending theme song for episodes 1 through 3. "Voices", which recurs throughout the series, is sung by Akino Arai, the singing voice for the character Myung Fang Lone; its main melody is based on Sicilienne, featured in the Pelléas et Mélisande by Gabriel Fauré. It is the second ending theme song, appearing on episode 4, and is also the ending theme song for Macross Plus: Movie Edition, the theatrical version of Macross Plus, which was released on August 27, 1995. "SANTI-U" by Gabriela Robin is one of Sharon Apple's songs. Members of the Israel Philharmonic Orchestra were also involved in the production, and part of the album was recorded in Tel Aviv. The album cover features a CG of one of Sharon Apple's logos.

=== Track listing ===
	Track name	Artist	Length
1.	National Anthem of Macross	Israel Philharmonic Orchestra	2:56
2.	Fly Up in the Air ~ Tension	Israel Philharmonic Orchestra	6:17
3.	After, in the Dark / Torch Song	Mai Yamane	9:00
4.	Myung Theme	Israel Philharmonic Orchestra	5:01
5.	Bees and Honey	Israel Philharmonic Orchestra	1:41
6.	In Captivity	Israel Philharmonic Orchestra	2:46
7.	More Than 3 cm	Israel Philharmonic Orchestra	4:28
8.	Voices	Akino Arai	3:54
9.	Break Out ~ Cantabile	Israel Philharmonic Orchestra	6:11
10.	Very Little Wishes	Israel Philharmonic Orchestra	2:29
11.	SANTI-U	Gabriela Robin	7:13

== Sharon Apple: The Cream P-U-F ==
Sharon Apple: The Cream P-U-F

Studio album
- Released: (Japan) February 22, 1995
- Recorded: 1994
- Genre: Anime soundtrack
- Length: 26:15
- Label: Victor
- Producer: Shiro Sasaki

Sharon Apple: The Cream P-U-F (「MACROSS PLUS」~ザ・クリーム・パフ) is a mini album featuring four Sharon Apple songs. It was only released in Japan.

=== Track listing ===
	Track name	Artist	Length
1.	Information High	Music/Arranged: CMJK, Lyrics: DAI & KEN=GO, Performance: Melodie Sexton	8:04
2.	Idol Talk	Music/Arranged: Yoko Kanno, Lyrics: Gabriela Robin & Akino Arai	5:40
3.	The Borderline	Music/Arranged: Yoko Kanno, Lyrics: Gabriela Robin	5:16
4.	SANTI-U	Music/Arranged: Yoko Kanno, Lyrics: Gabriela Robin	7:10

== Macross Plus Original Soundtrack II ==
Macross Plus Original Soundtrack II

Studio album by Yoko Kanno
- Released: (Japan) July 21, 1995 (United States) November 1995
- Recorded: 1994
- Genre: Anime soundtrack
- Length: 49:51
- Label: Victor
- Producer: Shiro Sasaki

Macross Plus Original Soundtrack II is the second soundtrack for the OVA series. "Idol Talk" by Akino Arai is the opening theme song for episode 2, while "Pulse" by Mongolian artist Wuyontana is the opening theme song for episode 4, marking her only solo appearance. She appears alongside Arai, Gabriela Robin, and Koko Komine as the Raiché Coutev Sisters, who perform A Sai Ën. The album cover features a CG of one of Sharon Apple's logos.

=== Track listing ===
	Track name	Artist	Length
1.	Idol Talk	Akino Arai	5:38
2.	Jade		3:27
3.	Nomad Soul		2:56
4.	Welcome to Sparefish		2:51
5.	Go Ri A Te		3:55
6.	Let's News		0:26
7.	Pulse	Wuyontana	5:19
8.	3 cm		4:14
9.	Voices (Acoustic Version)	Akino Arai	4:09
10.	Pu Qua O		3:18
11.	Sweet Feather		2:15
12.	A Sai Ën	Raiché Coutev Sisters	1:18
13.	Bad Dog		3:52
14.	Child Myung		3:01
15.	Coma		2:38

== Macross Plus Original Soundtrack Plus - for fans only ==
Macross Plus Original Soundtrack Plus - for fans only

Studio album by Yoko Kanno
- Released: (Japan) November 22, 1995
- Recorded: 1994–1995
- Genre: Anime soundtrack
- Length: 47:59
- Label: Victor
- Producer: Shiro Sasaki

Macross Plus Original Soundtrack Plus - for fans only features instrumentals and alternate versions of vocals not featured in the first two original soundtracks. It also includes music from Macross Plus: Movie Edition, the theatrical version of Macross Plus, which was released on August 27, 1995. The a cappella version of "Voices" by Akino Arai is the opening theme song for episode 1. Members of the Israel Philharmonic Orchestra and Czech Philharmonic Orchestra were involved in the production, with some of the recordings being done in Tel Aviv and Prague. Like The Cream P-U-F, for fans only was only released in Japan.

=== Track listing ===
	Track name	Artist	Length
1.	Welcome to Sparefish		2:53
2.	Fly Up in the Air	Israel Philharmonic Orchestra	2:58
3.	Idol Talk	Akino Arai	5:01
4.	Tepee		4:04
5.	Nomad Soul (Piano Version)		1:39
6.	Break Out	Israel Philharmonic Orchestra	3:03
7.	Cantabile	Israel Philharmonic Orchestra	3:17
8.	Myung Theme (Cello Version)	Israel Philharmonic Orchestra	5:41
9.	Wanna Be An Angel	Akino Arai	5:36
10.	SANTI-U	Gabriela Robin	5:09
11.	Torch Song	Gabriela Robin	2:39
12.	Dogfight	Czech Philharmonic Orchestra	4:06
13.	Voices (A Capella Version)	Akino Arai	2:15
