= Kirk Thornton =

American voice actor

- Other names: Ron Allen; Sparky Thornton; Spanky Roberts; Donald Lee
- Education: University of Washington
- Occupations: Voice actor; ADR director; screenwriter
- Years active: 1979–present
- Spouse: Julie Nesbitt
- Children: 2
- Website: kirkthornton.com (archived)

Kirk Thornton is an American voice actor, director and screenwriter working mainly with English-language versions of Japanese animated series.

== Career ==
His major roles include Brandon Heat in Gungrave, Hotohori in Fushigi Yūgi, Klein in Sword Art Online, Jin in Samurai Champloo, Anavel Gato in Gundam 0083: Stardust Memory, Hajime Saito in Rurouni Kenshin, Jet Link in Cyborg 009, Don Patch in Bobobo-bo Bo-bobo, Ensign Nogami in The Cockpit and numerous Digimon. Additionally, Thornton co-directed for the anime series Bleach alongside Wendee Lee and also serves as the narrator. In video games, he voices Organization XIII member Saïx in the Kingdom Hearts series and Shadow the Hedgehog and Orbot in the Sonic the Hedgehog series.

In early February 1989, Thornton appeared as a contestant on the game show Classic Concentration.

== Personal life ==
Thornton is married to Julie Nesbitt. Together they have two children.

== Filmography ==
=== Anime ===
List of English dubbing performances in anime
| Year | Title | Role | Crew role | Notes | Source |
|---|---|---|---|---|---|
| 1991 | Zillion: Burning Night | Big Odama | | | |
| 1992 | Fight! Iczer-One | Teacher | | As Sparky Thornton | |
| 1993 | Doomed Megalopolis | Doctor | | | |
| 1993 | The Cockpit | Ensign Nogami | | | |
| 1995 | Crimson Wolf | Professor Shagdol | | | |
| 1997 | Street Fighter II V | Guile | | | |
| 1997 | Super Pig | Milton Massen | | | |
| 1997 | Black Jack | Black Jack | | | |
| 1998 | Mobile Suit Gundam 0083: Stardust Memory | Anavel Gato | | As Sparky Thornton | |
| 1998 | Fushigi Yūgi | Hotohori | | As Sparky Thornton | |
| 1999 | Serial Experiments Lain | Masami Eiri | | | |
| 1999 | Perfect Blue | Yamashiro | | As Sparky Thornton, grouped under Voice Cast | |
| 1999 | Cowboy Bebop | Steve, Asimov Solensan | | | |
| 1999–2001 | Digimon: Digital Monsters | Gabumon, Mummymon, others | | Adventure/02/Tamers | |
| 2000 | The Castle of Cagliostro | Count Lazare do Cagliostro | | As Sparky Thornton. In the 1992 English dub of the film, he voiced Gendarme Captain Gustav and the Archbishop. | |
| 2001 | Rurouni Kenshin | Hajime Saito | | As Sparky Thornton | |
| 2001 | Transformers: Robots in Disguise | Dr. Onishi | | | |
| 2002 | Love Hina | Seta Noriyasu | | As Ronald Allen | |
| 2002 | Digimon Frontier | Tsunomon, Gabumon, Karatenmon | | | |
| 2002 | Gundress | | ADR director | | |
| 2002 | Cosmo Warrior Zero | | ADR director | | |
| 2002 | Ys | Ruta Gemma, Kaita | | Credited as Ron Allen and Sparky Thornton | |
| 2003 | Ys II: Castle in the Heavens | Darm, Ruta Gemma | | Credited as Ron Allen | |
| 2003 | s-CRY-ed | | ADR director | | |
| 2003 | Heat Guy J | Ken Edmundo | | | |
| 2004 | Duel Masters | Black Knight | | | |
| 2004 | Wolf's Rain | Leara's father | | | |
| 2004 | Gad Guard | | ADR director | | |
| 2004 | Gungrave | Brandon Heat / Beyond the Grave | | As Ron Allen | |
| 2004 | Tsukihime | | ADR director | | |
| 2004 | Mobile Suit Gundam F91 | Sam Ehrug | | | |
| 2004 | Sky Blue | Cade | | | |
| 2005 | Otogi Zoshi | | ADR director | | |
| 2005 | Planetes | Hachirota | | | |
| 2005 | Mars Daybreak | | ADR director | | |
| 2005 | IGPX | Mark | | TV series | |
| 2005 | Ghost in the Shell: Stand Alone Complex 2nd GIG | Kuze | | | |
| 2005–06 | Samurai Champloo | Jin | | Grouped under English Voice Cast | |
| 2005–09 | Naruto | Kisame Hoshigaki, Tazuna, others | ADR director (episodic) | | |
| 2006 | Eureka Seven | Matthieu | | | |
| 2006 | Kannazuki no Miko | Girochi | Voice Director | | |
| 2006 | Bobobo-bo Bo-bobo | Don Patch | | | |
| 2006 | Fate/stay night | Kiritsugu Emiya | | | |
| 2006–13 | Bleach | Narrator, Zennosuke Kurumadni, others | ADR director, ADR script | | |
| 2007 | Digimon Data Squad | Homer Yushima | | | |
| 2007 | Afro Samurai | Various | | | |
| 2008 | Blue Dragon | Minotaur | ADR director (episodic) | | |
| 2008 | Code Geass | Kaname Ohgi | | | |
| 2008 | Strait Jacket | George Thomson | | | |
| 2009 | Monster | The Baby, others | | | |
| 2009–13 | Stitch! | Hämsterviel, Suzuki, others | | | |
| 2009–18 | Naruto: Shippuden | Kisame Hoshigaki, Fukasaku, Shukaku, others | | | |
| 2012–14 | Monsuno | Beyal | | | |
| 2012 | Persona 4: The Animation | Kinshiro Morooka | | | |
| 2012 | The Testament of Sister New Devil | Jin Toujou | | | |
| 2012–present | Blue Exorcist | Shiro Fujimoto, Satan, Ukemochi | | | |
| 2013 | B-Daman Crossfire | Goichiro Tsukinowa / Grizz Sukino | | | |
| 2013 | K | Daikaku Kokujoji, Yujiro Benzai, Saburota Bandom, Prime Minister, Yo Chitose | | | |
| 2013–15 | Digimon Fusion | Tactimon, AxeKnightmon, Leviamon, Kabukimon, others | | | |
| 2013–present | Sword Art Online | Klein/Ryōtarō Tsuboi | | 3 TV seasons and a movie | |
| 2013–present | The Jungle Bunch | Maurice | | | |
| 2014 | Blood Lad | | ADR director | | |
| 2014–19 | Sailor Moon | Sakiko's Father (ep. 20), Takao (ep. 95), Katsutoshi Yamada (ep. 98), Dr. Gia/Sailor Doctor (ep. 185), Jotaro Kiriyama/Sailor Antique (ep. 186) | | Viz Media dub | |
| 2015 | Coppelion | Mitsuo Kawabata | | | |
| 2015 | Mobile Suit Gundam: The Origin | Ramba Ral | | | |
| 2015 | Durarara!!×2 | | ADR director | Directed the first part called Shō with Patrick Seitz | |
| 2015 | BlazBlue Alter Memory | Jubei | | | |
| 2015–16 | Aldnoah.Zero | Saazbaum | | | |
| 2016 | One-Punch Man | Snek, Sitch, Fukegao, and Frog-Man | | | |
| 2016 | March Comes In like a Lion | Kai Shimada | | | |
| 2017 | Hunter x Hunter | Dalzollene | | 2011 series | |
| 2017 | Anohana: The Flower We Saw That Day | Atsushi Yadomi | | | |
| 2018 | The Seven Deadly Sins | Galand | | | |
| 2018–2020 | Baki | Yujiro | | Netflix ONA | |
| 2019–present | Demon Slayer: Kimetsu no Yaiba | Hand Demon, Tanjuro Kamado | | | |
| 2020–21 | Boruto: Naruto Next Generations | Shukaku | | | |
| 2020 | Marvel Future Avengers | Arnim Zola, Scragg, Councilman Reiner, Narrator | | | |
| 2020 | Drifting Dragons | Ura | | | |
| 2020 | Dorohedoro | Narrator | | | |
| 2020 | Great Pretender | Seiji Ozaki | | | |
| 2021 | Kuroko's Basketball | Masaaki Nakatani | | | |
| 2021 | Case Closed: The Fist of Blue Sapphire | Inspector Ginzo Nakamori | | | |
| 2021–23 | Vinland Saga | Askeladd | | Netflix dub | |
| 2021 | The Faraway Paladin | Gus | | | |
| 2022 | Vampire in the Garden | Largo | | | |
| 2022 | Fate/Grand Carnival | James Moriarty | | | |
| 2022 | Cyberpunk: Edgerunners | Jimmy Kurosaki | | | |
| 2022–present | Bleach: Thousand-Year Blood War | Zennosuke Kurumadni, Rojuro Ohtoribashi, Hiyosu | | | |
| 2023 | The Legend of Heroes: Trails of Cold Steel – Northern War | Bleublanc (ep. 7) | | | |
| 2023 | Junji Ito Maniac: Japanese Tales of the Macabre | Tagaisu ("Four x Four Walls"; ep. 4a), Rogi ("Mold"; ep. 6a), Additional Voices | | | |
| 2023 | Mashle: Magic and Muscles | Regro Burnedead | | | |
| 2023–present | Jujutsu Kaisen | Atsuya Kusakabe, Narrator | | | |
| 2023 | Pluto | Schelling, The Doctor | | | |
| 2023 | Onimusha | Matsuki Kensuke | | | |
| 2023 | Akuma-kun | Saito | | | |
| 2024 | Mission: Yozakura Family | Ban Yozakura | | | |
| 2024 | Dandadan | Juichi Kito | | | |
| 2025 | Sakamoto Days | Pizza Nakajima, Yutaro's Father | | | |
| 2026 | Akane-banashi | Ikken Arakawa | | | |

=== Animation ===
List of voice performances in animation
| Year | Title | Role | Crew role | Notes | Source |
|---|---|---|---|---|---|
| 2007 | Edgar & Ellen | Mayor | | | |
| 2009 | Huntik: Secrets & Seekers | DeFoe | | | |
| 2009 | Superman: Red Son | Jimmy Olsen, Batman, Hal Jordan/Green Lantern, Pyotr Roslov | | Web series | Tweet |
| 2009 | Spectrobes | Commander Grant | | Web series | |
| 2012 | The Avengers: Earth's Mightiest Heroes | Adam Warlock | | Episode: "Michael Korvac" | |
| 2012 | Star Wars: The Clone Wars | King Sanjay Rash, others | | 3 episodes | |
| 2013 | Mad | Matt Hooper, Spock | | Episode: "Old Spock's Off Their Spockers" | |
| 2014 | Clarence | Buckey O'Neil | | | |
| 2014–17 | Sonic Boom | Orbot, Shadow the Hedgehog, various voices | | | |
| 2019 | Love, Death & Robots | Old Man | | Episode: "Fish Night" | |
| 2019 | Pucca: Love Recipe | Uncle Dumpling, Bruce | | | |
| 2020 | The Idhun Chronicles | Ashran | | | |

=== Films ===
List of voice and English dubbing performances in feature films
| Year | Title | Role | Crew role | Notes | Source |
|---|---|---|---|---|---|
| 2000 | Digimon: The Movie | Gabumon, MetalGarurumon and Omnimon (Shared) | | English dub | |
| 2004 | What the Bleep Do We Know!? | Voice Over Talent | | | |
| 2016–2018 | Digimon Adventure tri. | Gabumon, Garurumon, WereGarurumon, MetalGarurumon, Omnimon (shared), Tsunomon | | English dub | |
| 2016 | Kingsglaive: Final Fantasy XV | Newscaster | | English dub | |
| 2019 | The Queen's Corgi | Donald Trump | | US dub | |
| 2020 | Ni no Kuni | Teacher | | English dub | |
| 2020 | Digimon Adventure: Last Evolution Kizuna | Gabumon, Garurumon, WereGarurumon, Tsunomon, Omnimon (Shared), Gabumon (Bond of Friendship) | | English dub | |
| 2021 | Demon Slayer: Kimetsu no Yaiba – The Movie: Mugen Train | Tanjuro Kamado | | English dub | |

List of voice and English dubbing performances in direct-to-video and television films
| Year | Title | Role | Crew role | Notes | Source |
|---|---|---|---|---|---|
| 1994 | Dirty Pair: Project Eden | Boss | | | |
| 1995 | Street Fighter II: The Animated Movie | Guile | | As Donald Lee; English dub | |
| 1998 | Yu Yu Hakusho: The Movie | Hiei | | As Sean Thornton; English dub | |
| 1999 | Black Jack: The Movie | Black Jack | | As Sean Thornton; English dub | |
| 1999 | Perfect Blue | Yamashiro | | As Sparky Thornton | |
| 2001 | Akira | Various | | As Sparky Thornton, Animaze/Pioneer dub | |
| 2008 | Resident Evil: Degeneration | President | | English dub | |
| 2009 | Happily N'Ever After 2: Snow White Another Bite @ the Apple | Munk | | | |
| 2013 | Tiger & Bunny: The Rising | Muramasa Kaburagi | | English dub | |
| 2013 | The Snow Queen | Housemaster | | English dub | |
| 2014 | The Swan Princess: A Royal Family Tale | Jojo | | | |
| 2015 | The Nutcracker Sweet | Drosselmeyer, Commander, Mice | | Peruvian film | |
| 2017 | The Swan Princess: Royally Undercover | Antonio, Mechanic | | | |
| 2017 | The Jungle Bunch | Maurice | | English dub | |
| 2017 | The Son of Bigfoot | Japanese Man #1 (a.k.a. Asian Investor #1) | | Belgian-French film | |
| 2024 | Digimon Adventure: Our War Game! | Gabumon, MetalGarurumon, Omnimon | | English dub | |

List of motion capture performances in direct-to-video and television films
| Year | Title | Role | Notes | Source |
|---|---|---|---|---|
| 2012 | Resident Evil: Damnation | Ivan Judanovich / Ataman | | |

=== Live-action dubbing ===
List of English dubbing performances in live-action series
| Year | Title | Country | Dubbed from | Role | Original actor | Source |
|---|---|---|---|---|---|---|
| 2016 | Marseille | France | French | Farid | Hedi Bouchenafa | |

=== Video games ===
List of voice and English dubbing performances in video games
| Year | Title | Role | Crew role | Notes | Source |
|---|---|---|---|---|---|
| 1998 | Brave Fencer Musashi | Ed | | | |
| 1999 | Rugrats: Studio Tour | Tour Guide (Larry), Security Guard (Steve), Pirate Director, Racetrack Announcer | | | |
| 2000 | Gundam Side Story 0079: Rise From the Ashes | Leung Lee-Fai | as Sparky Thorton | | |
| 2000 | Silent Bomber | John Loss | | as Sparky Thornton | |
| 2001 | The Bouncer | Commander | | as Sparky Thornton | |
| 2001 | Kessen II | Cao Cao | | | |
| 2002 | Digimon Rumble Arena | Gabumon, MetalGarurumon, Omnimon | | | |
| 2003 | .hack//Infection | Orca | | | |
| 2003 | Dynasty Warriors series | Xiahou Dun, Meng Huo | | From 4 to 8 | |
| 2003 | Mission: Impossible – Operation Surma | Simon Algo, George Spelvin | | | |
| 2003 | Front Mission 4 | Billy Renges | | | |
| 2004 | .hack//Quarantine | Orca | | | |
| 2004 | Resident Evil Outbreak: File 2 | Kevin Ryman | | | |
| 2004 | Scaler | Bootcamp | | | |
| 2004 | World of Warcraft | Various | | | |
| 2005 | Xenosaga Episode II | Capt. Matthews | | | |
| 2005 | Dungeons & Dragons: Dragonshard | Various voices | | | |
| 2005 | JumpStart Reading | Trash Can, Trash Can't | | | |
| 2006 | Kingdom Hearts II | Saïx | | Also Final Mix | |
| 2006 | Samurai Champloo: Sidetracked | Jin | Voice director | | |
| 2006 | Dirge of Cerberus: Final Fantasy VII | Various | | | |
| 2006 | Enchanted Arms | | Voice director | | |
| 2006 | Xenosaga Episode III: Also Sprach Zarathustra | Capt. Matthews | | | |
| 2006 | Company of Heroes | Various | | | |
| 2006 | Baten Kaitos Origins | Shanath | | English dub | |
| 2006 | Tales of the Abyss | Jade Curtiss | | | |
| 2006–07 | .hack//G.U. series | Negimaru, Antares, Azure Orca | | | |
| 2007 | Rogue Galaxy | Cancer King, Various | Voice director | | |
| 2007 | Ghost Rider | Mephisto | | | |
| 2007 | Spectrobes | Commander Grant | | | |
| 2007 | Kane & Lynch: Dead Men | Various | | | |
| 2007 | Digimon World Data Squad | Lucemon, Creepymon, Commander Homer Yushima | | | |
| 2007 | Time Crisis 4 | | Voice director | | |
| 2007–11 | WWE SmackDown vs. Raw/WWE | | Voice director | 2008–12 versions | |
| 2007–14 | Naruto games | Kisame Hoshigaki, Mifune, Foo, others | | Starting with Ultimate Impact | |
| 2008 | Race Driver: Grid | Pit Chief | | | |
| 2008 | Are You Smarter Than a Fifth Grader | | Voice director for Jeff Foxworthy | | |
| 2008 | Spider-Man: Web of Shadows | Various | | | |
| 2008 | Call of Duty: World at War | Marine | | | |
| 2008 | Endwar | Various | | | |
| 2008 | Biohazard: Degeneration | President | | | |
| 2008 | The Tale of Despereaux | | Guest Director | | |
| 2009 | The Lord of the Rings: Conquest | Grim Wormtongue | | | |
| 2009 | Hotel for Dogs | | Voice director | | |
| 2009 | Monsters vs. Aliens | Various | | | |
| 2009 | Red Faction: Guerrilla | MacReady | Additional Voice Over Direction | Voice roles grouped as "Also with" | |
| 2009 | Dirt 2 | | Voice director | | |
| 2009 | Marvel: Ultimate Alliance 2 | Electro, others | | | |
| 2009 | Kingdom Hearts 358/2 Days | Saïx (No. VII) | | | |
| 2009 | Operation Flashpoint: Dragon Rising | Saber | Additional Voice Direction, Casting Director | | |
| 2009 | Magna Carta 2 | Nix | | | |
| 2009 | Dragon Age: Origins | Various | | | |
| 2009 | Call of Duty: Modern Warfare 2 | Col. Marshall | | | |
| 2009 | Silent Hill: Shattered Memories | Harry Mason | | | |
| 2010 | Final Fantasy XIII | Cocoon Inhabitants | | English dub | |
| 2010 | Resonance of Fate | Juris | | English dub | |
| 2010 | Kingdom Hearts Birth by Sleep | Isa | | | |
| 2010 | Hot Wheels Racing Circuit | Ace Turner | | | |
| 2010–present | Sonic the Hedgehog games | Shadow the Hedgehog, Orbot, others | Main role | Grouped under English character voices | |
| 2011 | DC Universe Online | Superman, Calculator | | | |
| 2011 | Catherine | Thomas Mutton/Dumuzid | | | |
| 2012 | Binary Domain | Yoji Amada, Mifune | | | |
| 2012 | Battleship | Captain Willie Perozzi | | | |
| 2012 | Guild Wars 2 | Various | | | |
| 2012 | Resident Evil 6 | BSAA | | | |
| 2013 | Fire Emblem Awakening | Yen'fay | | English dub | |
| 2013 | Gears of War: Judgment | COG News Reporter, COG Announcer, Survivor Six | | | |
| 2013 | Kingdom Hearts HD 1.5 Remix | Saïx (No. VII) | | | |
| 2014 | Earth Defense Force 2025 | Midnight Pilot, Ranger 3 | | | |
| 2014 | Digimon All-Star Rumble | Gabumon, MetalGarurumon/Omnimon | | | |
| 2014 | Kingdom Hearts HD 2.5 Remix | Saïx (No. VII) | | | |
| 2015 | Xenoblade Chronicles X | Maurice Chausson | | | |
| 2016 | The Legend of Heroes: Trails of Cold Steel II | Bleublanc | | Uncredited | |
| 2016 | Lego Dimensions | Shadow the Hedgehog | | | |
| 2017 | Friday the 13th: The Game | Mitch Floyd | | Uncredited | |
| 2017 | Horizon Zero Dawn | Hishavan | | | |
| 2017 | Octopath Traveler | Additional voices | | | |
| 2019 | Kingdom Hearts III | Saïx | Main role | English dub/ADR Director | |
| 2019 | Judgment | Kaoru Ichinose | | English dub | |
| 2020 | One-Punch Man: A Hero Nobody Knows | "Snakebite" Snek | | | |
| 2020 | Deadly Premonition 2: A Blessing in Disguise | The Mirror | | | |
| 2020 | The Legend of Heroes: Trails of Cold Steel II | Bleublanc | | Credited as Ron Allen | |
| 2020 | Yakuza: Like a Dragon | Additional voices | | English dub | |
| 2021 | Nier Replicant ver.1.22474487139... | Sebastian, additional voices | | English dub | |
| 2021 | Shin Megami Tensei III: Nocturne HD Remaster | Additional voices | | | |
| 2021 | Call of Duty: Vanguard | Additional voices | | | |
| 2021 | Demon Slayer: Kimetsu no Yaiba – The Hinokami Chronicles | Tanjuro Kamado, Hand Demon, Akaza | | | |
| 2021 | Shin Megami Tensei V | Zeus | | | |
| 2022 | Fire Emblem Warriors: Three Hopes | Additional voices | | | |
| 2023 | Trinity Trigger | Ionia Simmons, Dolk | | English dub | |
| 2023 | The Legend of Heroes: Trails into Reverie | Soldiers & Citizens of Zemuria | | English dub | |
| 2023 | Mato Anomalies | Francois, Young Man, Kalpa Monk | | English dub | In-game credits |
| 2023 | Starfield | Benjamin Bayu | | | |
| 2024 | Like a Dragon: Infinite Wealth | Additional voices | | English dub | |
| 2024 | Persona 3 Reload | Igor | | English dub | |
| 2024 | Unicorn Overlord | Conrad, Great Sage of Bastorias, Mercenaries (Type F), additional voices | | English dub; credited as Kirk Allen | |
| 2024 | Farmagia | Zucchero, additional voices | | English dub; credited as Ron Allen | |
| 2025 | Like a Dragon: Pirate Yakuza in Hawaii | Additional voices | | English dub | |
| 2026 | Yakuza Kiwami 3 & Dark Ties | Additional voices | | English dub | |
| 2026 | Trails in the Sky 2nd Chapter | Phantom Thief Bleublanc | | English dub | |
| 2026 | Grand Theft Auto VI | The Local Population | | | |

=== Other voice work ===
- iLife 08 apps
