= Shamanic Princess =

Japanese OVA series

- Laser Disc cover

シャーマニックプリンセス (Shāmanikku Purinsesu)
- Genre: Drama, action, magical girl
- Original video animation
- Directed by: Mitsuru Hongo; Hiroyuki Nishimura
- Produced by: Minoru Takanashi; Kazuhiko Ikeguchi; Kōji Kikei
- Written by: Mami Watanabe; Mitsuru Hongo; Hiroyuki Nishimura
- Music by: Yoshikazu Suo
- Studio: Triangle Staff
- Licensed by: NA: Media Blasters
- Released: June 25, 1996 – June 25, 1998
- Runtime: 30 minutes per episode
- Episodes: 6
- Novel

Shamanic Princess Yorudo no Za
- Written by: Mami Watanabe
- Illustrated by: Atsuko Ishida
- Published by: Kadokawa Shoten
- Published: September 1998

Shamanic Princess (Japanese: シャーマニックプリンセス, Hepburn: Shāmanikku Purinsesu) is a six episode OVA series developed by the Princess Project creative collective and produced by Animate Film in association with Triangle Staff starting in June 1996 and continuing over a two-year period. Central Park Media (CPM) licensed the series for its North America release through CPM's US Manga Corps in 2000. Following the closure of Central Park Media, the series has been re-licensed to Media Blasters for a 2013 release. The OVA later premiered on Toku in the United States in January 2016 and was added to Tubi in 2019 with its 2013 DVD's cover art.

== Format & Release ==
Shamanic Princess has had multiple releases over the years. Its initial Japanese release was on 6 Obi LaserDiscs holding 1 episode each and 3 VHS tapes holding 2. The first episode was released in June 1996, and the last was released in June 1998.

Its initial English (ENG) subtitled release was in 2000, also on 3 VHS tapes holding 2 episodes. It was later re-released on 1 DVD in February 2001 as The Complete Shamanic Princess with ENG dub, original Japanese (JPN) audio, ENG sub, and the following DVD & DVD-ROM Features:

- Chapter Stops
- Sneak Peeks
- Motion Menus
- Bonus Japanese Trailers
- Info About the Artist
- Scripts
- Art Gallery
- Character Bios
- Reviews
- Production & Cast Credits

In that same year (2001), it was released on 2 region 2 DVDs within their own case—numbered 1 & 2 respectively—and with JPN audio and French (FRE) subtitles.

After the Media Blasters re-licensing, it was again re-released on 1 DVD as Shamanic Princess with only the following Special Features:

- Textless Opening
- Textless Closing TV Spots

=== Cover art ===
==== Front ====
While the ENG 2001 & 2013 DVD's respective front cover art only differs in its text—with the latter bearing nothing more than the series title in a style very similar to the series 'title logo'--the LaserDiscs all use their own cover art, including a winged depiction of Tiara that's not shown in the series. DVD #2's front cover art matches the LaserDisc Vol. 2's and, to a lesser degree, the 2001 DVD's rear cover art. Other than Vol. 1 of the LaserDiscs and #1 of the FRE DVD's both matching the first VHS tape's, the rest of the 13 releases use a completely different front cover art.

Only the 2000 VHS tapes have their own subtitle on the front cover: Tiara's Quest, The Talisman Unleashed, and Guardian World respectively.

==== Rear ====
The 2001 & 2013 DVD's, 2000 VHS tapes, 1990's LaserDiscs, and FRE DVD's all use their own set of rear cover art with relatively few similarities. Only the first VHS tape (Tiara's Quest) and 2001 DVD align their text to the left side while the FRE DVD's and last 2 VHS tapes align theirs to the right. The LaserDiscs and 2013 DVD all align theirs to the center, with the LaserDiscs reserving a small portion of the right side for additional information.

Vol. 2 of the LaserDiscs heavily resembles the first VHS tape, which includes 2 more images from the series, and both of the FRE DVD's rear cover art most closely resembles the 2013 DVD's, but with the following:

- all-French text
- a much larger paragraph in the center
- the series 'title logo' at the top center
- the names of the first 3 episodes (1. Le Trône de Yord, 2. La Forêt, 3. L'Eveil) in the upper center
- the Staff list sectioned off on most of the right side
- 4 screenshots spread out like photos below the center paragraph instead of 6 above it
- the Beez Entertainment company logo on the lower left instead of CJ and AnimeWorks'
- 5 fairies in-flight throughout, with 1 seemingly pointing at the screenshot of Tiara on the lower right and another reaching for the 'title logo' at the top center

=== Internal Art ===
The LaserDiscs all have their own art inserts, including:

- Vol. 1:
  - an illustration of Lena, on the left side, standing with her hand over a smaller cutout-like Kagetsu who appears to be part of her dress while Tiara, on the right side, stands in side profile turning back to the viewer with her forefinger covering her mouth and the image of Sara on the side of her dress
    - smaller illustrations of Leon & Japolo's respective head are above their respective partners
    - in between them both are simple non-English manga panels
  - an entirely blue illustration of a kaiju Japolo on the left side blasting a burning city with his mouth ray while Tiara, on the right side, stares on
- Vol. 2:
  - an illustration of Tiara & Lena in a wedding gown with humorous non-English manga panels and a praying Sara in between them
  - a red version of Volume 1's kaiju illustration
- Vol. 3:
  - an illustration of Tiara & Lena standing in fancy fantasy gowns with non-English manga panels and a very long-legged young Sara floating between them with a bouquet of red flowers in both hands
  - a dark grey version of Volume 1's kaiju illustration
  - adverts for "1 • 25 New Release Information" on the bottom, Entertainment's Mini Mini Magazine cover on the top right, and "Coming Soon EMOTION!" 2/25/1997 sales on the top left
- Vol. 4:
  - an illustration of Tiara standing in a field of flowers next to a large lake with her pink dress blowing in the wind along with a recently released bandage while yellow-haired fairies fly around in front of her
  - a green version of Volume 1's kaiju illustration
  - adverts for "6 • 25 New Release Information" on the bottom, Entertainment's Mini Mini Magazine cover on the top right showing the series' 2013 DVD cover art, and "Coming Soon EMOTION!" 7/26/1997 sales on the top left
- Vol. 5:
  - a cover art-like illustration of a young Tiara & Sara standing in front of Graham, whose left arm is completely bandaged with blood splotches throughout
  - a yellow version of Volume 1's kaiju illustration
  - adverts for "11 • 25 New Release Information" on the bottom, Entertainment's Mini Mini Magazine cover on the top right, and "Coming Soon EMOTION!" 12/18/1997 sales on the top left
- Vol. 6:
  - the cover art of the third VHS tape (Guardian World)
  - line art of Tiara, Lena, and three characters who appear to be from a different anime

=== Disc Art ===
The 2001 DVD's disc art shows an illustration of Tiara & Lena standing partially back-to-back in front of a large blue moon while interlocking fingers and looking at the viewer, matching the left side of the third VHS tape's rear box art, and the front cover's title at the bottom.

The 2013 DVD's disc art shows the front cover's stylized title at the top of a blue background bearing the series' enlarged eye symbol.

The LaserDiscs only have an inch or so of a 'cover' around their center with the series' 'title logo' at the top, the Side # on the right, and the Volume # on the bottom along with extra text. The background color of Vol. 1-4 all match or resemble their respective rear cover's background while Vol. 5-6 both use white instead of red and black respectively.

=== Chronology ===
The show is known partially for its odd chronology: the first 4 episodes properly consist of what fans dub the "Throne of Yord Saga", and the final 2 episodes cover the happenings that lead up to the Throne of Yord situation.

=== Adverts ===
Shamanic Princess appeared in multiple adverts, including but not limited to:

- VHS sell sheets
- CPM's The Anime Zone Buyer's Guide online catalogs
- Right Stuf's MangaStuf newsletters
- Video Business magazine's June 26, 2000, issue titled Central Park Media 10 Years of Anime Leadership

=== Reception ===
Right Stuf's monthly MangaStuf newsletter for June 2000 predicted that the series "should do well" while listing both the ENG dub & sub versions of the first VHS tape (Tiara's Quest) selling for $17.99 and $22.49 respectively among many other releases.

The Video Business interviewer Hulse Ed wrote that Mike Pascuzzi (CPM's Director of Sales) believed the second VHS tape (The Talisman Unleashed) could be their biggest release of 2000 before quoting him as saying "It's already got several fan Web sites devoted to it." and "There has been a lot of buzz, and we're getting plenty of inquiries."

=== Other Releases ===
==== Mahou Tsukai Tai! vs. Shamanic Princess (OVA) ====
The latter half of the 1998 OVA Mahou Tsukai Tai! vs. Shamanic Princess (alt title: Shamanic Princess vs. Magic User's Club) shows 2 minutes and 43 seconds of a Shamanic Princess centered animation that presents multiple versions of Tiara all wearing different clothing as well as nude. At the very end, presented in chibi form sitting arms folded and legs crossed in front of multiple naked women's butts, 2 of its creators are shown above their respective name and title: S-ki Seiji (Story Concept) and Hongou Mitsuru-kun (Director).

The short omake was only sent to buyers who could prove they purchased all 6 first edition LaserDiscs of both series and was never sold in stores.

== Discrepancies ==
=== Dub vs Sub ===
The ENG dub & sub both show different character names in episode 6's credits:

- The Throne of Yord / Talisman of Yorde
- Graham / Gram
- Elder / An Elder

The ancestor Magic Users in episodes 5 & 6 are called "Priestesses" in the ENG credits roll, but are missing from the JPN one.

=== Subtitles vs Ep. 6 Credits ===
The ENG subtitles show "Sara" throughout the series, but it's spelled "Sarah" in the credits.

== Plot ==
The Guardian World lies in another dimension, and its inhabitants are charged with guarding and controlling magical forces. To this end, the inhabitants possess varying levels of magical power which allows them to change shape, destroy objects, suspend time, or call up elemental beings to do their bidding. The source of power in the Guardian World is the Throne of Yord, a mysterious painting watched over by the Elders, who train Neutralizers to tend the Throne and make sure it is kept safe. One of these Neutralizers (Kagetsu) has stolen the Throne and taken it to Earth for an unknown purpose, causing the Elders to send two different teams to Earth to reclaim the Throne—for if the Throne is away for too long or is destroyed, the Guardian World will be undone.

== Characters ==
Tiara (ティアラ)
Voiced by: Sayuri (Japanese); Tara Sands (English)
A member of the Guardian World's royal family, Tiara is an agent charged with retrieving the Throne of Yord. She believes strongly in her duty and is well known as one of the most powerful people in her world: she can both summon elemental beings and transform herself into a demon-like creature with red hair/wings coming from her head. Tiara is hot-tempered and can be abrasive, but she is more innocent and naïve than she likes to let on.

As the story opens, she enrolls in a girls' college and pretends to be an ordinary young woman, as she searches for the powerful Throne of Yord, and her ex-lover Kagetsu. She is angered by Kagetsu's killing of her partner Graham, and by her classmate Lena's assistance of Kagetsu. The fact that Tiara's best friend Sara is inside the Throne of Yord does not initially seem to bother her. But after Kagetsu is badly injured by a mysterious foe, Tiara finds that she has feelings for him still, and is not sure whether to help him or obey her orders.

When the Throne of Yord overtakes the entire city, Tiara starts fighting its cruel personality, and is forced to reexamine her feelings and her selfish motives. She teams up with Leon, Lena, Kagetsu and Japolo, and manages to bring Sara's kindly personality to the forefront of the Throne.

She, Lena and Kagetsu return the Throne to the Guardian World, and Tiara mentions that she and Kagetsu will be "starting all over" romantically.

Episodes 5-6 show some of Tiara's earlier years, as well as her budding love affair with Kagetsu, and the tempestuous, confusing relationship with her deformed first partner, Graham. She had great difficulty summoning Graham, because he was ensnared by her "shadow demon", until Tiara absorbed her shadow side and gained new power from it.

Though Tiara cared deeply about Graham, she did not return his romantic feelings, and was angered by his hostility towards Kagetsu.

Tiara initially seems very cold, nasty and mocking, as well as indifferent to the possible suffering of her friend Sara, which provokes Lena to rage against her. However, her confusion begins to show as she remembers her love for Sara and Kagetsu, and by the end she has become a much more understanding, warm person.

Japolo (ジャポロ)
Voiced by: Rica Matsumoto (Japanese); P.M. Lewis (English)
A small, ferret-like creature, Japolo appears in episodes 1-4, and briefly at the end of Episode 6. He is Tiara's "partner", according to Guardian World terminology, or a creature summoned into the Guardian world to assist Tiara, after the shocking death of her first partner Graham. He has considerable magical power, but doesn't seem to be very strong physically.

Despite his title, Tiara and Japolo are neither peers nor equals. Japolo serves Tiara as a familiar and acts as a backup to her powers. He is highly intelligent, and possesses much knowledge which Tiara doesn't about her mission and why the Throne was stolen. Japolo's powers include being able to freeze time by creating suspension fields (which allows battles to go on in crowded cities without anyone noticing), and detecting other magical presences from his world.

Despite his irritation with and frequent criticism of Tiara, Japolo is quite fond of her, and announces that when she is upset, depressed, angry or in an emotional slump, he will be there to help. Despite their respective mistress's fights, he is on friendly terms with Lena's partner Leon. For reasons that are unknown, Japolo has an Eastern European accent in the English dub.

Graham (グラム)
Voiced by: Rica Matsumoto (Japanese); Tristan Goddard (English)
Graham has a slightly dark straw-colored half-mask covering the left side of his face, a constantly wide open left eye, a permanently closed right eye, a large mask-matching clawed gauntlet for a left arm, and bandages wrapped around parts of both legs. Graham used his superhuman strength and shapeshifting right hand to support Tiara.

Graham is the first "partner" whom Tiara summoned, only appearing in episodes 5–6. He was, however, disfigured in the process, and possibly suffered brain damage since he landed on his head upon entry and talking seems to be difficult for him. Tiara had to fight long in order to possess him, as well as fighting off a demon formed from her own shadow, which now is the demon-like creature she can become in battle. Because of this Graham initially feared Tiara, but his fear soon gives way to a fierce loyalty and limerance.

He feels that Tiara's love for Kagetsu is unhealthy and sees Kagetsu as the source of her pain, though most of those thoughts came from his own affection for her. Graham attacked Kagetsu in the final episode when Kagetsu stole The Throne of Yord (containing the soul of his sister Sara), because the thought of Kagetsu hurting Tiara by leaving enraged Graham. Unable to match Graham's superior physical strength, and about to be strangled to death, Kagetsu reluctantly "neutralizes" Graham in the struggle. As Graham's physical form was perpetuated as an extension of Tiara's magic, neutralizing it disintegrates Graham's body. Screaming in pain, the last thing he says is Tiara's name.

Lena (レナ, Rena)
Voiced by: Mitsuki Yayoi (Japanese); Suzy Prue (English)
Lena is a childhood friend of both Sara and Tiara, and later, a rival to Tiara. She uses a flute to perform her magic, summoning vines, ribbons and greenish specters to battle Tiara. Lena is calm and reserved, and while much admired for her accomplishments she harbors feeling of inferiority towards Tiara, partly because Tiara's magic seems to be stronger. With support from the Throne of Yord, she too can become a demon-like creature during battles.

She originally was sent to retrieve the Throne of Yord and Kagetsu, but eventually ended up joining him, seemingly because of her affection for her childhood friend Sara. She attempted to mislead Tiara, but ended up fighting her on two occasions, enraged that Tiara could so coldly refuse to help her best friend and ex-lover. She was particularly angry when Kagetsu was badly injured by the Throne of Yord while attempting to save Tiara.

Lena, along with Leon and Kagetsu, is sucked into the Throne of Yord, and she is possessed to fight Tiara. However, she collapses from the Throne of Yord's control, and teams up with Tiara to defeat it. At the end, she accompanies Tiara, Leon and Kagetsu back to the Guardian World.

Over the course of the series, Lena reluctantly realized that she is in love with Kagetsu, but does nothing to pursue these feelings, perhaps realizing that Kagetsu is only in love with Tiara.

Leon (レオン, Reon)
Voiced by: Hiro Yūki (Japanese); Alvaro J. Gonzalez (English)
Leon is Lena's "partner", capable of transforming into a ferocious beast and mirroring Japolo's powers. Leon has a preternatural attachment to Lena and will defend her regardless of the risk to himself. He is only moderately powerful, but Lena can lend him her powers via her flute.

Leon was summoned right around the time the Throne was stolen, and immediately became very attached to "Miss Lena." He accompanies her to our world and assists her in helping Kagetsu, caring more for her wishes than for the orders of the Guardian World. He fights Tiara and her spirit beasts on more than one occasion, but confers with her partner Japolo on friendly terms.

When the Throne sucks Lena and Kagetsu inside itself, Leon is pulled in as well. He ends up being controlled by the Throne, through Lena, and collapses with blood streaming from his eyes during a fight with Tiara. Later, he and Japolo are devoured by the Throne, but both turn up at the end alive and well, and return to the Guardian World with their respective mistresses.

During fights, Leon can be powered up to two levels—he can be enveloped in Lena's vines, making him only slightly more powerful, and he can turn into a white-haired beastlike warrior who is nearly capable of defeating Tiara. He apparently smokes a great deal when stressed, a habit Lena does not like. Leon makes it clear that he would stop if she ordered him to, but asks that she allow him this one vice.

Kagetsu (華月)
Voiced by: Kōichi Yamadera (Japanese); Crispin Freeman (English)
A Neutralizer from the Guardian World, Kagetsu possesses the ability to neutralize other people's magic, but his ability to summon powers of his own is limited. He is able to summon "invisible power" in the form of a small shield, and a neutralizing spirit with the command "Aumkis".

Kagetsu was Tiara's first love, as well as the devoted brother of her best friend Sara. The two fall in love over the course of Tiara's studies, but their relationship became strained after Sara vanished. Kagetsu knew what had happened, since he could hear his sister's voice inside the Throne of Yord, but was unsure what to do. As Kagetsu tried to figure out what to do, he also had to contend with Graham's jealousy. Though Kagetsu tried to be kind to Graham, Graham followed and attacked him while he stole the Throne. Kagetsu was forced to kill Graham as he fled.

He hid out in a small attic room in our world, and joined forces with Lena as they tried to figure out what to do. When Lena was attacked by Tiara, Kagetsu stayed close so he could neutralize Tiara's magic. But when Tiara was attacked by the Throne, Kagetsu tried to rescue her at the cost of his own safety. He was badly injured, but the incident reawakened Tiara's love for him.

During his recovery, Kagetsu was drawn into the Throne, along with Lena and Leon. He was forcibly bound inside a wall, and forced to watch as his friends and ex-lover fought one another under the Throne's influence. After the Throne defeated Lena and Tiara both, Kagetsu broke free and confronted the Throne, only to be informed that it wanted to stay with him forever (presumably Sara's influence). It consumes him and possesses him, forcing him to fight Tiara.

Fortunately with Sara's help, Tiara is able to break the malign influence on Kagetsu. Kagetsu has another vision of his sister thanking him—and his friends—for trying to help her, and for letting her be the dominant part of the Throne. Finally at peace, and knowing his sister is happy, Kagetsu returns the Throne and reunites with Tiara. Because he returned it willingly, he is apparently not punished.

Sara (紗羅)
Voiced by: Tomo Sakurai (Japanese); Mary Anne Towne (English)
Sara is Kagetsu's sister and a Tiara's childhood friend. A sweet, gentle girl with a weak constitution, she has untapped ability as a Neutralizer. She mysteriously disappeared before the Throne of Yord was stolen by her older brother, who could hear her voice coming from the painting.

Unable to handle this, Kagetsu stole the painting and promised Sara he would save her. Sara also appeared in a series of dreams to Tiara, giving her cryptic advice about reality and how to capture her. She does not seem particularly worried about what is going on, except for the possibility of causing trouble for others.

It is implied at the conclusion of the "Throne of Yord Saga" (and is indeed the thing that saves Tiara's life) that Sara is and always has been a part of the Throne of Yord, and that she was destined to be joined to it from birth. However, her personality seems to have been submerged under the Throne's malevolent personality, until Tiara brings her to the forefront. She thanks her friends and brother for helping her, and remains as part of the Throne.

The Throne of Yord (ヨルドの座, Yorudo no Za)
Voiced by: Rokuro Naya (Japanese); Tristan Goddard (English)
The Throne of Yord is the powerful entity (in the form of a painting) which shaped the Guardian World. It is sentient and exists in what appears to be a world within the painting, as well as the painting itself (it is both world and painting). It enjoys taking the shape of other characters, and is very manipulative of some of the characters. It is a lonely being, which is why it takes Sara in as part of its being.

== Music ==
One of Shamanic Princess' standout features is its unique soundtrack, composed by Yoshikazu Suo. With songs ranging from relaxed chamber orchestra pieces, to synthesizer-driven pieces with rambling melodies and tribal-inspired percussion. Mysterious, moody, and sometimes jarring, the soundtrack complements the atmosphere of the OVA admirably. Notable songs include the opening and ending themes Morning of Prayer (祈りの朝 Inori no Asa) and Forest of Memories (思い出の森 Omoide no Mori), performed by Miwako Saito and the ep. 5 ending song, Festival of the Wind (風の祭り Kaze no Matsuri), performed by the Mongolian singer Wuyontana, which was also performed at ep. 6's halfway point.
