= Hyper Doll =

Japanese manga series

- Cover of US DVD release of Hyper Doll

楽勝!ハイパードール (Rakushou! Haipā Dōru)
- Genre: Action, Comedy
- Manga
- Written by: Shimpei Itoh
- Published by: Tokuma Shoten
- Magazine: Shōnen Captain
- Original run: January 1995 – September 1997
- Volumes: 5
- Original video animation
- Directed by: Makoto Moriwaki
- Written by: Ryou Motohira
- Music by: Takayuki Negishi
- Studio: Triangle Staff
- Licensed by: NA: Geneon USA
- Released: September 25, 1995 – November 25, 1995
- Episodes: 2

Hyper Doll (楽勝!ハイパードール, Rakushou! Hāipa Dōru) is a Japanese manga series by Shimpei Itoh. It was adapted into a two episode OVA by Triangle Staff between September 25, 1995, and November 25, 1995. The story is about two alien androids that are sent from space to defend the Earth. An English-dubbed version of the OVA was later released in the US by Pioneer Entertainment (later Geneon) in VHS & LaserDisc format in two volumes, each containing a single episode, between March 26, 1996, and June 18, 1996. The OVA series was released on DVD in Japan on October 23, 1998, and in the US on November 21, 2000.

== Plot ==
Mew and Mica, two spacey alien androids, pose as cute high school students to conceal their identities as the most undependable dynamic duo ever sent to defend the Earth. The OVA follows the misadventures of Mew, Mica and their reluctant friend, Akai.

== Characters ==
Mew Fumizuki
Hyper Doll Mew, has short blue hair and is quieter and more laid back than Mica.
Mica Minazuki
Hyper Doll Mica has long red hair and is more outgoing.
Hideo Akai
Classmate of Mew and Mica who knows the secret identities of the Hyper Dolls. Slightly afraid of them, due to them threatening to twist his head off.
Shouko Aida
Another classmate of Mew and Mica's. Constantly attempting to find the identities of the Hyper Dolls. May have a crush on Akai.
Detective Toudou
Local police officer who is in over his head when facing super-powered threats to the city. An unashamed fan of the Dolls.
Commander
The Hyper Dolls' commander who sent them to defend the Earth. He is very slug-like in appearance and appears on various foods in holographic form.

=== Cast ===
Hyper Doll cast
Role	Japanese	English
Role	Japanese	Animaze (1996)
Narrator	Michihiko Hagi	Jonathan Cook
Mew Minazuki	Mayumi Iidzuka	Heidi Lenhart
Mica Minazuki	Yukana Nogami	Julie Ann Taylor
Hideo Akai	Mitsuaki Madono	Jonathan Fahn
Shouko Aida	Yuri Shiratori	Bridget Hoffman
Dr. Zaiclit	Seizou Katou	Milton Jamin
The Commander	Ritsuo Sawa	Steve Blum
Konishi	Takashi Nagasako	Gary Dubin
Matsushita	Yuuji Ueda	Joe Romersa
Detective Toudou	Ken Yamaguchi	Daran Norris
Kurageman	Kuujira	Richard Cansino
Inagoman	Hidetoshi Nakamura	Kevin Seymour
Mimizuman	Fumihiko Tachiki	Tony Pope
Erika	Megumi Ogata	Dyanne DiRosario

== Anime ==
No.	Title	Original release date	English release date
1	"The Earth, The Earth is in a Bind!"; Transliteration: "Chikyū ga Chikyū ga Dai Pinch!" (Japanese: 地球が地球が大ピンチ！)	September 25, 1995	March 26, 1996
Mew Fumizuki and Mica Minazuki are two alien androids posing as schoolgirls while secretly serving as Earth's defenders. Despite their reluctance to take their duties seriously, they must confront two giant monsters sent by the mad scientist Dr. Zaiclit: Kurageman, resembling an enormous jellyfish, and Inagoman, a giant grasshopper. Meanwhile, their classmate Hideo Akai, who knows their secret identities, worries that their friend Shouko Aida's attempts to discover the Hyper Dolls' identities will put her in danger.
2	"Peace on Earth, Love Humans!"; Transliteration: "Chi ni wa Heiwa o Hito ni wa Ai o!!" (Japanese: 地には平和を人には愛を！！)	November 25, 1995	June 18, 1996
Mount Fuji erupts as Mimizuman, a gigantic earthworm equipped with an acid-firing collar, emerges. Dr. Zaiclit had intended the creature to participate in a coordinated attack alongside Kurageman and Inagoman, but its inability to follow instructions has delayed its arrival. Mew and Mica initially refuse to fight Mimizuman, considering the task beneath them, but eventually defeat it. Despite this latest failure, Zaiclit remains undiscouraged and looks forward to continuing his schemes.

== Reception ==
The Encyclopedia of Science Fiction described Hyper Doll as a reasonably amusing pair of original video animations, comparing its combination of science fiction action and comedy to Dirty Pair, although it considered the series less substantial. It highlighted the humor arising from the protagonists' reluctance to perform their duties as Earth's defenders and their interactions with a human classmate who knows their secret identities. The encyclopedia also noted the considerable fan service, particularly in the revealing costumes worn by the two heroines. It expressed regret that the story remained unfinished after only two episodes, suggesting that insufficient commercial success may have prevented further installments.

== Music ==
Opening theme
"Fight! Easy Win! Hyper Doll" (戦え!楽勝!ハイパードール, Tatakae! Rakushō! Hāipa Dōru)

Lyrics: Natsuko Karedo
Music: Hiromoto Hisawa
Arrangement: Ikurō Fujiwara
Performed by Mayumi Iizuka and Yukana Nogami

Ending theme
"Monster" (モンスター, Monsutā) (Episode 1)

Lyrics: Yū Aku
Music: Shunichi Tokura
Performed by Mayumi Iizuka and Yukana Nogami

"Heart no Ace ga Detekonai" (ハートのエースが出てこない; "Show the Ace of Hearts") (Episode 2)

Lyrics: Machiko Ryū
Music: Kōichi Morita
Performed by Mayumi Iizuka, Yukana Nogami, and Yuri Shiratori
