= Dyanne DiRosario =

American voice actress

- Other name: Dyanne de Rosario
- Occupations: Voice actress; make-up artist

Dyanne DiRosario is an American former voice actress and make-up artist. She has provided voices for a number of English-language versions of Japanese anime films and television series.

== Filmography ==
=== Voice Roles ===
- Akira - Groupie
- Perfect Blue - Yukiko
- Bastard!! - Sean Ari
- Battle Athletes - Akari Kanzaki (OVA); Tomoe Midou (Victory)
- Carried by the Wind: Tsukikage Ran - Onami
- Fight! Iczer-1 - Sepia
- Gate Keepers - Barako Ogawa
- Code Geass - Additional voices
- .hack//Liminality - Kie
- Hyper Doll - Erika
- Legend of Black Heaven - Rinko
- Macross Plus - Lucy Macmillan
- Mobile Suit Gundam - The Movie Trilogy - Kacyllia Zabi
- Mobile Suit Gundam 0083: Stardust Memory - Paula Gullish
- Royal Space Force: The Wings of Honnêamise - Matti's Girlfriend
- The Castle of Cagliostro - Waitress

=== Live Action Roles ===
- Al TV - Crazed Fan
- On the Edge - Shawna
- Portal - VAL
- Scarecrows - Kellie
