= Taishō Baseball Girls =

Japanese light novel series and its adaptations

- Cover of the first light novel

大正野球娘。（たいしょうやきゅうむすめ。） (Taishō Yakyū Musume.)
- Genre: Historical, slice of life, sports
- Light novel
- Written by: Atsushi Kagurazaka
- Illustrated by: Sadaji Koike
- Published by: Tokuma Shoten
- Imprint: Tokuma Novels Edge
- Original run: April 17, 2007 – June 17, 2010
- Volumes: 4
- Manga
- Written by: Shimpei Itoh
- Published by: Tokuma Shoten
- Magazine: Monthly Comic Ryū
- Original run: July 19, 2008 – February 19, 2011
- Volumes: 5
- Anime television series
- Directed by: Takashi Ikehata
- Written by: Takashi Ikehata
- Music by: Takayuki Hattori
- Studio: J.C.Staff
- Licensed by: NA: Sentai Filmworks
- Original network: TBS
- Original run: July 2, 2009 – September 24, 2009
- Episodes: 12
- Video game

Taishō Yakyū Musume: Otome Tachi no Seishun Nikki
- Developer: Suzak
- Publisher: 5pb.
- Genre: Visual novel
- Platform: PlayStation Portable
- Released: October 29, 2010

Taishō Baseball Girls (Japanese: 大正野球娘。, Hepburn: Taishō Yakyū Musume) is a Japanese light novel series written by Atsushi Kagurazaka and illustrated by Sadaji Koike. Tokuma Shoten published four novels from April 2007 to June 2010. It has been adapted into a drama CD, a manga series serialized in Monthly Comic Ryū, and an anime television series animated by J.C.Staff aired between July and September 2009. The anime had been licensed in North America by Sentai Filmworks and Section23 Films released the complete collection on November 16, 2010.

== Story ==
In 1925, after being told by a baseball player that women should become housewives instead of going to school, two 14-year-old Japanese high school girls named Koume and Akiko decide to start a baseball team in order to prove him wrong. During this time, when even running was considered too vulgar for women, baseball is known as "what the boys do" and they face many difficulties when having to find enough members, to get permission from their parents and also when learning about the sport itself.

The first book in the series opens in Taishō 14 (1925), introducing Koume, who is the 14-year-old daughter of a yōshoku restaurant owner, and a student at a local girls' academy. One day, Koume's friend, Akiko, asks her to join in an all-girl baseball team and have a match against a boys team. While the first volume can be read as a stand-alone work, the second volume develops the storyline further.

The second book is set in the summer of Taishō 14. Koume, Akiko, Manoe and the rest of the nine members of the Baseball Girls continue to face off against numerous all-boy teams, and have trouble dealing with the fast balls thrown by the boys. To combat the anxiety they experience, playing against more experienced teams, they decide to abandon their traditional baseball uniforms in favor of a kimono-style uniform. The girls also partition off the batter's box so that other teams cannot see what they are doing.

Apart from baseball, the series also deals with certain cultural changes that are not seen quite so often in anime. For example, the popular "sailor" school uniforms, now a staple of real-world Japanese schools, as well as school-based anime and manga, are only just being introduced into Japanese society during the Taishō period in which this work is based.

== Characters ==
=== Main characters ===
The main characters are the members of the girls' baseball team Ouka-kai. Most of the girls are from class 1–2 and the team's coach is their homeroom teacher.

Koume Suzukawa (鈴川 小梅, Suzukawa Koume) Voiced by: Mikako Takahashi (Drama CD) / Kanae Itō (anime)
The main protagonist of story, second member and catcher of team. She is the daughter of a yōshoku restaurant owner. Her dream is to wear a sailor uniform.

Akiko Ogasawara (小笠原 晶子, Ogasawara Akiko) Voiced by: Maria Yamamoto (Drama CD) / Mai Nakahara (anime)
Koume's closest friend, captain and pitcher of the team. She is from a wealthy family.

Yuki Souya (宗谷 雪, Sōya Yuki) Voiced by: Asami Imai (Drama CD) / Mamiko Noto (anime)
Class president and childhood friend of Tamaki. She and Tamaki played baseball with boys when they were in elementary school. She is third/fourth team member: she spoke with Koume about their baseball team in the evening, but Koume didn't recognize her desire, and so Yuki repeated her request on the following day again (after Noe). She supplied first baseball equipment for the team (catcher mask, several gloves and balls) and also "stole" first team uniforms (western-like sport uniform) from her family kimono shop (it was too modern, so it didn't sell and was kept in storage).

Noe Kawashima (川島 乃枝, Kawashima Noe) Voiced by: Kaoru Mizuhara (Drama CD) / Kana Ueda (anime)
Third/fourth member and main strategist/tactician of the team.

Tomoe Tsukubae (月映 巴, Tsukubae Tomoe) Voiced by: Aya Endo (Drama CD) / Yuko Kaida (anime)
Fifth member and Shizuka's elder twin sister. She has a huge crush on Koume and joined the team to be closer to her. Before the baseball team, she was in the newspaper club. She is very athletic and her dream is to hit a home run. Unlike her twin, she wears a sailor uniform for school. She shares a room with her twin in the school dorms.

Shizuka Tsukubae (月映 静, Tsukubae Shizuka) Voiced by: Hiromi Konno (Drama CD) / Eri Kitamura (anime)
Sixth member and Tomoe's younger twin sister. Before the baseball team, she was also in the newspaper club. Unlike her twin, she normally dresses in traditional Japanese clothing.

Kyouko Sakurami (桜見 鏡子, Sakurami Kyōko) Voiced by: Yui Makino
Seventh-eighth member. She has a large crush on Tomoe, and when Tomoe asked her to join – she agreed without thinking.

Tamaki Ishigaki (石垣 環, Ishigaki Tamaki) Voiced by: Masumi Asano (Drama CD) / Ryou Hirohashi (anime)
Ninth member. Yuki's childhood friend. Initially she was the most skilled player in team.

Kochou Kikusaka (菊坂 胡蝶, Kikusaka Kochō) Voiced by: Saori Goto
Noriko's replacement. Before the baseball team she was on the track team.

Anna Curtland (アンナ・カートランド, Anna Kātorando) Voiced by: Chiaki Takahashi (Drama CD) / Satomi Arai (anime)
She is the English language teacher, class 2–1 homeroom teacher and the girls' coach.

Name	Position	Class	Membership order
Akiko Ogasawara	Pitcher	2–1	Initiator
Koume Suzukawa	Catcher	2–1	2nd
Shizuka Tsukubae	First base	2–1	6th
Yuki Souya	Second Base	2–1	3rd/4th
Tomoe Tsukubae	Third Base	2–1	5th
Tamaki Ishigaki	Shortstop	2–1	9th
Kyouko Sakurami	Left Fielder	1–1	7th–8th
Owari Noriko (retired)	Center Fielder	2–2	7th–8th
Kochou Kikusaka	Center Fielder	1–1	—
Kawashima Noe	Right Fielder	2–1	3rd/4th

=== Others ===
Noriko Owari (尾張 記子, Owari Noriko) Voiced by: Ayumi Fujimura
The newspaper club president. Initially she was seventh-eighth member (she was forced to join by Tomoe because she owed her money), lately she retired from the team, but she stays their fan.
Saburou Kitani (紀谷 三郎, Kitani Saburō) Voiced by: Satoshi Hino
A young man who's a promising chef and works in the Suzukawa's restaurant. He becomes Koume's fiancé through arranged marriage in the middle of the anime.
Sousuke Iwasaki (岩崎 荘介, Iwasaki Sōsuke) Voiced by: Masayuki Katou
Akiko's arranged finance. He held chauvinistic views believing women belonged only in domestic roles prompting Akiko to take up baseball. He changes after playing against her.
Banboku Takahara (高原 伴睦, Takahara Banboku) Voiced by: Shinji Kawada
One of Iwasaki's fellow baseball players, due to a misunderstanding he self-proclaims himself Koume's boyfriend henceforth becoming extremely rude and pushy about it.

== Media ==
=== Anime ===
An anime television series adaptation animated by J.C.Staff was announced in August 2008 and aired for 12 episodes on TBS from July 2 to September 24, 2009, replacing K-On! in its timeslot. It was written and directed by Takashi Ikehata with character designs by Kanetoshi Kamimoto, who is known for his design work for Tomy toys. The anime was licensed in North America by Sentai Filmworks and the complete collection was released on November 16, 2010.

=== Drama CD ===
Taishō Baseball Girls: Young Ladies Hiking (大正野球娘。乙女たちのハイキング, Taishō Yakyū Musume: Otome-tachi no Haikingu)
Audio CD, 72 minutes, 7 tracks, Frontier Works, FCCN-0032, 21 December 2007.

=== Manga ===
A manga series by Shimpei Itoh was published in Monthly Comic Ryū from July 19, 2008, to February 19, 2011, and collected into five volumes.

=== Novels ===
Taishō Baseball Girls. (大正野球娘。, Taishō Yakyū Musume.)
221 pages, April 17, 2007, ISBN 978-4-19-850742-8, Tokuma Shoten
Taishō Baseball Girls: Covered in Dust and Dirt (大正野球娘。―土と埃にまみれます, Taishō Yakyū Musume. Tsuchi to Hokori ni Mamiremasu)
202 pages, August 20, 2008, ISBN 978-4-19-850753-4, Tokuma Shoten
Imperial Capital Takoyaki Girls: Taishō Baseball Girls. 3 (帝都たこ焼き娘。―大正野球娘。3, Teito Takoyaki Musume. Taishō Yakyū Musume. San)
212 pages, July 2009, ISBN 978-4-19-850831-9, Tokuma Shoten
Taishō Baseball Girls. 4 (大正野球娘。4, Taishō Yakyū Musume. Yon)
224 pages, June 17, 2010, ISBN 978-4-19-850866-1, Tokuma Shoten
