= Kevin Seymour =

American ADR director and voice actor (1958–2014)

- Seymour, unknown date
- Born: Kevin Michael Seymour; December 25, 1958
- Died: February 6, 2014 (aged 55)
- Other names: Quint Lancaster, Jenny Haniver, Dougary Grant, Tom Carlton, Michael Porter, Bodean Chubb, Mr. X, Bull Whizins
- Occupations: ADR director, ADR screenwriter, voice actor
- Years active: 1987–2014

Kevin Seymour (December 25, 1958 – February 6, 2014) was an American ADR (automated dialogue replacement) director and writer and voice actor, known for his work on numerous English-language anime dubs.

== Career ==
Seymour was the founder of U.S. Renditions and Animaze, and worked on the English versions of titles, including Ninja Scroll, the Ghost in the Shell franchise, Macross Plus, Perfect Blue, Armitage III, Metropolis, and Code Geass - Lelouch of the Rebellion, as well as redubs of Akira and The Castle of Cagliostro.

Seymour was responsible for the 2000 English voice direction overdub applied to the 1972 Tokyo Movie/A Production Japanese anime film Panda! Go, Panda!.
