= Shimpei Itoh =

Japanese manga artist

Shimpei Itoh (伊藤 伸平, Itō Shinpei, born June 17, 1960 in Saitama Prefecture, Japan) is a Japanese manga artist. His best-known works include Moldiver and Hyper Doll. He recently began a new series, Taishō Baseball Girls, based on the light novels by Atsushi Kagurazaka.

Itoh's works are characterized by fight teams, idol stars, military action, and science fiction laced with inside jokes based on otaku culture. He also tends to include a lot of explosions, handgun fights, and gritty action scenes.

== Works ==
- Apple Cinderella (1987, 1 volume), Shogakukan
- Ayame ni Oteage! (1987–1988), Shogakukan
- Tokyo Bakuhatsu Musume (1992, 1 volume), Fujimi Shobo
- Moldiver (1993–1994, 3 volumes), Tokuma Shoten
- Rakushō! Hyper Doll (1995–1997, 5 volumes), Tokuma Shoten
- Nemesis no Tsurugi (1996, 1 volume), Hakusensha
- Angel Attack (1998, 2 volumes), Hakusensha
- Angel Heart (1998, 1 volume), Hakusensha
- Haruka Refrain (1998, 1 volume), Hakusensha
- Tokyo Bakuhatsu Musume (1998, 2 volumes), Kadokawa Shoten
- Shōjo Tantei (1999, 1 volume), Tokuma Shoten
- Suteki na Lovely Boy (2001, 1 volume), Shonengahosha
- Mazinger Anthology (2002, 1 volume), Futabasha
- Angel Heart: Shinseiki Sailor-fuku Densetsu (2002, 1 volume), Noir Shuppan
- Eien no Grace (2002, 1 volume), Shonengahosha
- Cutie Honey aGoGo! (2005–2007, 2 volumes), Kadokawa Shoten/Tokuma Shoten, based on the works by Go Nagai
- Nihon Furusato Chibatsu (2006, 1 volume), Tokuma Shoten
- Ko wa Kasugai Amanatto (2008, 1 volume), Tokuma Shoten
- Taishō Baseball Girls (2008-current), Tokuma Shoten, based on the light novels by Atsushi Kagurazaka
