= The Castle of Cagliostro =

1979 film by Hayao Miyazaki

Lupin III: The Castle of Cagliostro
- Theatrical release poster art
- Kanji: ルパン三世 カリオストロの城
- Romanization: Rupan Sansei: Kariosutoro no Shiro
- Directed by: Hayao Miyazaki
- Screenplay by: Hayao Miyazaki; Haruya Yamazaki
- Based on: Lupin III by Monkey Punch
- Produced by: Tetsuo Katayama
- Starring: Yasuo Yamada; Eiko Masuyama; Kiyoshi Kobayashi; Makio Inoue; Goro Naya; Sumi Shimamoto; Tarō Ishida
- Cinematography: Hirokata Takahashi
- Edited by: Mitsutoshi Tsurubuchi
- Music by: Yuji Ohno
- Animation by: Yasuo Ōtsuka
- Production company: Tokyo Movie Shinsha
- Distributed by: Toho
- Release date: 15 December 1979
- Running time: 100 minutes
- Country: Japan
- Language: Japanese
- Budget: ¥500 million (US$2.3 million)

Lupin III: The Castle of Cagliostro (Japanese: ルパン三世 カリオストロの城, Hepburn: Rupan Sansei: Kariosutoro no Shiro) is a 1979 Japanese animated action adventure comedy film directed and co-written by Hayao Miyazaki. It is the second animated feature film based on the 1967–69 manga series Lupin III by Monkey Punch and the third film from said franchise in general. The film was Miyazaki's feature directorial debut after having previously worked as an animator for Toei Animation and Telecom Animation Film, and directing several animated television series, including Lupin III Part I.

The Castle of Cagliostro follows gentleman thief Lupin III, who successfully robs a casino—only to find the money to be counterfeit. He heads to the tiny country of Cagliostro, the rumoured source of the bills, and attempts to save the runaway Princess Clarisse from Count Cagliostro's men; the Count plans to marry Clarisse in order to cement his power and recover the fabled ancient treasure of Cagliostro, requiring Clarisse's ancestral ring. Lupin enlists his associates, Jigen and Goemon, and sends his calling card to the Count to get Inspector Zenigata, his longtime nemesis, to the castle. After becoming trapped in the dungeon under the castle, Lupin and Zenigata form a pact to escape and foil the Count's counterfeit operation and save Clarisse from her forced marriage to the Count.

The original theatrical release in Japan occurred on 15 December 1979, distributed by Toho. In North America, it was screened at various festivals in the early 1980s, while a heavily edited and shortened version became available in the form of an arcade LaserDisc video game, Cliff Hanger (1983), combined with footage from the previous Lupin III film, The Mystery of Mamo (1978). The Castle of Cagliostro eventually made its American theatrical debut on 3 April 1991, with the home release following in October 1992. This first theatrical dub was produced by Streamline Pictures and released on home video the following year. A new dubbed version was produced by Manga Entertainment in 2000 and has had several releases.

Despite initially underperforming at the box office, The Castle of Cagliostro has garnered high praise, with critics and historians noting the film's influence on Miyazaki's later works, becoming the most popular and well-regarded entry in the entire Lupin III franchise, and has since been recognised as a cult film. However, some have disapproved of its depiction of Lupin as a gallant hero instead of his original persona as a ruthless criminal. The film has served as a major influence on animators and directors worldwide, such as filmmaker John Lasseter and several Walt Disney Animation Studios films, including titles of the Disney Renaissance. The Japanese computer animated film Lupin III: The First (2019) also has a plot structure loosely modelled after The Castle of Cagliostro.

== Plot ==
Master thief Lupin III and his colleague, Daisuke Jigen, flee the Monte Carlo Casino with huge quantities of stolen money, but as they celebrate their latest heist, Lupin recognizes the bills as distinctively high-quality counterfeits. (Note: In the Japanese dialogue, the counterfeit bills are called "Gōto-satsu" (ゴート札), which is written as "Ghoto bills" in the heavily-simplified TMS subtitled version. The Streamline dub, which used TMS' subtitles as its primary translation source, explains that "Ghoto" was the name of the person responsible for the creation of Cagliostro's counterfeiting ring. The Animaze/Manga dub interprets "Gōto" as a transliteration of goat – the Japanese word for which is "yagi" (ヤギ) – in part due to the abundant goat and ram-related imagery present in the film, and thus refers to the counterfeits as "Goat bills". However, in the Japanese version, Lupin describes the writing on Clarisse's ring as being "Gōto-moji" (ゴート文字), or Gothic characters, which implies that the houses of Cagliostro are descended from the ancient Goths. The Animaze/Manga dub describes the writing as "Capran", furthering the film's symbolic use of goats. When preparing the English subtitles for Discotek Media's DVD and Blu-ray, translators Shoko Oono and Reed Nelson chose to name the counterfeits "Gothic bills" instead of "Goat bills".) Deciding to seek out the source, they head to the Grand Duchy of Cagliostro, the alleged wellspring of the counterfeits.

Shortly after arriving, the two are passed by a young woman in a wedding gown driving a red car being chased by a group of armed thugs. They attempt to rescue the young woman, but in the ensuing mayhem Lupin is knocked unconscious and the woman gets captured. However, she leaves him a signet ring. After seeing the ring, Lupin recognizes the woman as Clarisse, the princess of Cagliostro, who will soon be married to Count Cagliostro, the country's regent against her will. The Count's arranged marriage will cement his power and recover the fabled ancient treasure of Cagliostro, for which he needs both his and Clarisse's ancestral rings.

The next night, a squad of assassins attack Lupin and Jigen at their inn, but they escape. Lupin leaves his calling card on the back of Jodot, the Count's butler and chief assassin, announcing he is going to steal Clarisse. Lupin summons Goemon Ishikawa XIII and tips off his longtime pursuer, Inspector Koichi Zenigata, to his whereabouts to provide a distraction. Lupin disguises himself as Zenigata and makes his way into the castle, while the real Zenigata ends up trapped in the castle's catacombs. After meeting his on-off lover Fujiko Mine posing as Clarisse's lady-in-waiting, Lupin makes his way to Clarisse and returns her ring, vowing to help her to escape. Before he can act, the Count drops Lupin down a trapdoor into the catacombs. Lupin mocks the Count through the ring he gave to Clarisse—a fake containing a transmitter—and the Count sends three assassins to retrieve the real ring.

Lupin encounters Zenigata, and they form a pact to help each other escape. After overpowering the assassins, they escape into a room full of printing presses, the source of the counterfeits which Cagliostro has used throughout history to form a global shadow empire. Zenigata wants to collect evidence, but Lupin points out they must escape the castle first. They start a fire as a distraction and steal the Count's autogyro, but as they attempt to rescue Clarisse, Lupin is seriously wounded. Clarisse offers the ring to the Count in exchange for Lupin's life, but after securing the ring, the Count's attempt at betrayal is foiled when Fujiko's actions allow her, Lupin, and Zenigata to flee. As Lupin recovers from his injuries, Zenigata tries convincing his superiors at Interpol to prosecute the Count for counterfeiting, but fearing political repercussions, they halt the investigation and remove him from the case. Lupin intends to stop the wedding and rescue the princess, revealing to his companions that ten years earlier she had saved his life during his unsuccessful first attempt to find the treasure of Cagliostro. Fujiko tips off Lupin regarding how to sneak into the castle, and forms a plan with Zenigata to publicly reveal the counterfeiting operation under the cover of pursuing Lupin.

The wedding with a drugged Clarisse appears to go as planned, until Lupin disrupts the ceremony and, despite the Count's precautions, makes off with Clarisse and the Count's rings. To expose the Count's operations, Zenigata leads Fujiko, posing as a television reporter, to the Count's counterfeiting facility. After the Count corners Lupin and Clarisse on the clock tower's face, Lupin attempts to trade the rings for Clarisse's life, but the Count betrays him, and Lupin and Clarisse fall into the castle's lake. After using the rings on a secret mechanism built into the tower, the Count is crushed to death by the converging clock arms. Lupin and Clarisse watch as the mechanism drains the lake to reveal exquisite Roman ruins—the true treasure of Cagliostro. Clarisse explains that she doesn't want Lupin to go, even expressing her readiness to become a thief like him, but Lupin gently rejects her, and he and his friends bid farewell to Clarisse, now the rightful heir of Cagliostro. With Zenigata pursuing them again (for the crime of "stealing Clarisse's heart") and Fujiko fleeing with the plates from the printing presses, Lupin and the gang leave Cagliostro.

== Voice cast ==
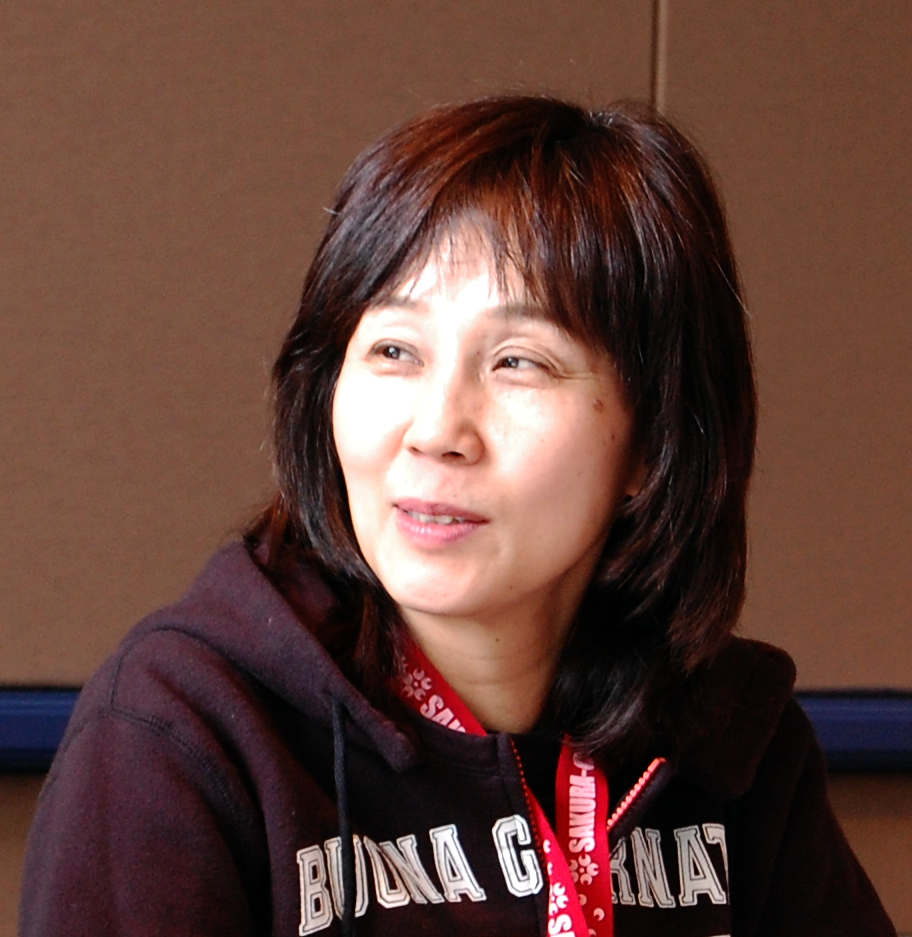
Sumi Shimamoto voiced Lady Clarisse de Cagliostro in the original Japanese version

| Character name | Voice actor | | | |
| Character name | Japanese | English | | |
| Character name | Japanese | Screenmusic Studios/Streamline (1991) | Animaze.. iNC/Manga (2000) | Epcar Entertainment/Discotek Media (2025) |
|---|---|---|---|---|
| Arsène Lupin III | Yasuo Yamada | Wolf | David Hayter | Tony Oliver |
| Arsène Lupin III | Yasuo Yamada | Bob Bergen | David Hayter | Tony Oliver |
| Lady Clarisse de Cagliostro | Sumi Shimamoto | Joan-Carol O'Connell; Barbara Goodson (young) | Bridget Hoffman | Cherami Leigh |
| Count Lazare de Cagliostro | Tarō Ishida | Michael McConnohie | Kirk Thornton | Jamieson Price |
| Chief Inspector Koichi Zenigata | Gorō Naya | Insp. Keibu Zenigata | Kevin Seymour | Doug Erholtz |
| Chief Inspector Koichi Zenigata | Gorō Naya | David Povall | Kevin Seymour | Doug Erholtz |
| Daisuke Jigen | Kiyoshi Kobayashi | Steve Bulen | John Snyder | Richard Epcar |
| Fujiko Mine | Eiko Masuyama | Edie Mirman | Dorothy Elias-Fahn | Michelle Ruff |
| Jodot | Ichirō Nagai | Jodo | | Steve Kramer |
| Jodot | Ichirō Nagai | Jeff Winkless | Milton James | Steve Kramer |
| Goemon Ishikawa XIII | Makio Inoue | Steve Kramer | Michael Gregory | Lex Lang |
| Gardener | Kōhei Miyauchi | Walter | Christopher | Paul St. Peter |
| Gardener | Kōhei Miyauchi | Mike Reynolds | Barry Stigler | Paul St. Peter |
| Gendarme Captain Gustav | Tadamichi Tsuneizumi | Kirk Thornton | Joe Romersa | Jason Charles Miller |
| Interpol Chairman | Shōzō Hirabayashi | Jeff Winkless | Peter Spellos | Paul St. Peter |
| Riot Squad Captain | Jūji Matsuda | Captain Sam | Jamieson Price | Bill Rogers |
| Riot Squad Captain | Jūji Matsuda | Kerrigan Mahan | Jamieson Price | Bill Rogers |
| Archbishop | Kinpei Azusa | Kirk Thornton | Michael Forest | Paul St. Peter |
| Hostess | Yōko Yamaoka | Julie Donald | Dyanne DiRosario | Kayli Mills |

== Production ==
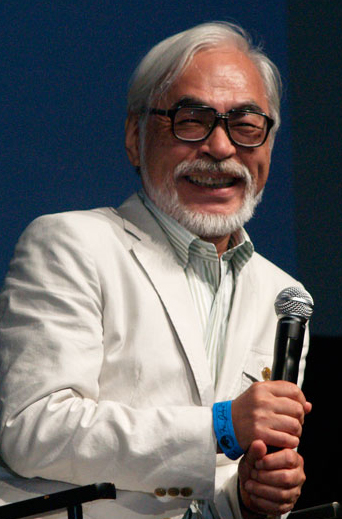
Miyazaki at the 2009 San Diego Comic-Con

Lupin III began as a Japanese manga series written and illustrated by Monkey Punch. The title character, Lupin III, was inspired by (and is claimed in the series to be the grandson of) Maurice Leblanc's fictional character Arsène Lupin, a gallant and famous outlaw able to outsmart even Sherlock Holmes. Lupin III is a gentleman thief and announces his intentions to steal valuable objects by sending a calling card to the owners of the desired items. The manga's popularity led to two anime series, titled Lupin III and Lupin III Part II. The first film, The Mystery of Mamo, was released on 16 December 1978. The Castle of Cagliostro released a year later following the financial success of that film. This is marked as the first feature-length film to be directed by Hayao Miyazaki, who had previously co-directed episodes of the first Lupin anime series with Isao Takahata. The two directors along with Toshio Suzuki would give birth to Studio Ghibli in 1985. He was also a writer and director of two episodes in the second series under the pseudonym "Telecom", both produced a year after Cagliostro. In works other than Castle of Cagliostro and the series episodes directed by Miyazaki and Takahata, Lupin III is portrayed as a scheming and lecherous thief, sometimes supported by his former enemies Jigen and Goemon. Miyazaki's film conflicts with the typical behaviour and personality of the characters, a change that has been described as Lupin "growing up".

Castle of Cagliostro marked Miyazaki's debut as a theatrical movie director, but he also was a writer, a designer, and a storyboardist on the movie. The production for the film began in May 1979 with the writing of the story and storyboarding for the film. Miyazaki began by drawing a bird's eye view of the setting before creating the story to completion. After the first draft scenario was returned to Miyazaki without change, he began the storyboards. The story was divided into four parts, but after reaching the third part changes had to be made at the storyboard phase in order to not exceed the decided running time. Animation work began in July while the storyboards were only a quarter complete; Miyazaki had to complete them during the animation production. Production wrapped up at the end of November and the film's premiere on 15 December 1979 was a short seven and a half months from the project's undertaking, with only five months of production time.

The film draws upon many sources of inspiration that were important in the production of the film. McCarthy writes that a research trip was not specifically undertaken for the film, but says Miyazaki's Heidi, Girl of the Alps sketchbooks were useful for the scenery. Miyazaki would cite Italian Mountain Cities and the Tiber Estuary from Kagoshima Publishing as influencing the production of the film. The film included elements that were seen in other Arsène Lupin works, including La Justice d'Arsène Lupin by Boileau-Narcejac, involving the discovery of a tremendous stash of forged franc notes with which World War I–era Germany had planned to destabilize the French economy. Maurice Leblanc's The Green-eyed Lady also featured a secret treasure hidden at the bottom of a lake. The design of mechanisms with secret tunnels in the clock tower, and the adventure plotted around beauty is inspired from Ghost Tower by Edogawa Ranpo. The castle is visually influenced by that of the original 1952 unfinished release of The King and the Mockingbird. Greenberg writes, "Cagliostro also borrowed many narrative and visual elements from Grimault's film: the basic plotline of disrupting the wedding of an evil tyrant and a beautiful innocent girl, the tyrant's luxuriously-decorated palace that is also full of traps, and a gang of henchmen serving the tyrant – both oversized goons and ninja-like assassins..." The staff added personal touches to the film, the most iconic being Lupin's car, the Fiat 500, was the car of head animator Yasuo Ōtsuka. Clarisse's car in the chase scene is a Citroën 2CV, which was Miyazaki's first car.

McCarthy describes the summery color palette of the film as matching the scenery and the characters, but notes the use of dark and light colours to emphasize the subplot of the dark and light sides of the Cagliostros. The film's score was composed by series regular Yuji Ohno, and varies between jazz, romance and orchestral music. Notably, it includes a variation of Lupin III's iconic TV theme. The music was performed by You & The Explosion Band, who had previously worked on the second television series. The main vocal song "Fire Treasure" was performed by Bobby (aka Toshie Kihara) and saw release as an LP single. The first release of the soundtrack was Lupin the 3rd The Castle of Cagliostro Original Soundtrack BGM Collection, an album containing extended versions of select cues from the film. It was originally sold on vinyl and cassette tape in 1983, but later saw release on CD in 1985 with several additional prints runs. In 2003, the entire score was finally released on a newly commissioned album entitled Lupin the 3rd: The Castle of Cagliostro – Music File and also contained 13 unused cues.

Castle of Cagliostro's portrayal of the characters was changed to better identify with Miyazaki's concept of a "hero" and to remove a sense of apathy in the story. This resulted in Lupin being a happy-go-lucky and upbeat thief who drives and lives out of a Fiat 500; a sharp contrast to the scheming and lecherous Lupin who drives expensive cars like the Mercedes-Benz SSK because it was "Hitler's favorite". The changes would also impact secondary characters like Jigen and Goemon, changing their serious and cold personalities into friendly and humorous; even the erotic elements involving the femme-fatale Fujiko were dropped.

Fred Patten, who worked at Streamline Pictures was involved in the English adaptation of the film and was involved in the choice of title for the English release,

The Japanese title is Lupin III: Cagliostro no Shiro, which is literally Lupin III: Cagliostro of Castle [sic]. (Note: Cagliostro no Shiro actually translates to 'Castle of Cagliostro'.) So which would be better in English; Cagliostro Castle, Cagliostro's Castle, or The Castle of Cagliostro? It was my argument that The Castle of Cagliostro sounded the most sinister. Cagliostro Castle is just a castle's name, like Windsor Castle, but the Castle of Cagliostro emphasizes that it is the evil Count's lair!

The film had a production budget of ¥500 million or $2,282,000 (equivalent to $10,000,000 in 2025) at the time, surpassing Space Battleship Yamato (1977) to become the most expensive anime film up until then. Its production budget record was later matched by Miyazaki's Laputa: Castle in the Sky (1986) and then surpassed by Royal Space Force: The Wings of Honnêamise (1987).

== Release ==
The film's Japanese theatrical release was on 15 December 1979.

=== Box office ===
In Japan, the film grossed ¥610 million, equivalent to $2,784,000 (equivalent to $12,000,000 in 2025), in 1979. The MX4D release in 2017 grossed a further ¥76 million ($678,000) in Japan. The film's overseas screenings in 2007 and 2017 grossed $152,775 in Italy and South Korea, and $142,425 in the United States, adding up to at least $3,753,200 grossed in Asia, Italy and the United States.

In terms of box office admissions, the film sold 900,000 tickets in Japan as of 2006, 109,072 tickets in France and Italy, 58,000 tickets in the United States, and 1,729 tickets in South Korea, adding up to at least 1,068,801 tickets sold worldwide.

=== English releases ===
In 1980, Tokyo Movie Shinsha began screen testing the film in North America and it was notably shown at the World Science Fiction Convention in Boston for a marketing survey. It was later screened at other festivals during the 1980s, including FILMEX 82 in Los Angeles. Despite resounding acclaim from the screenings, many of them were unsuccessful. According to Fred Patten, the primary reason was that, "most people did not bother to come to it since it was 'only' an animated-cartoon feature, not a 'serious' live-action movie." A heavily edited and shortened version of the film eventually became available in North America in the form of an arcade laserdisc video game, Cliff Hanger (1983), which combined an English-dubbed version of the film's footage with that of the previous Lupin film Mystery of Mamo.

The American theatrical debut was on 3 April 1991 in New York City by Carl Macek's Streamline Pictures, with the home release following in October 1992. Due to copyright issues with the estate of Maurice Leblanc, the creator of the original Arsène Lupin, Lupin is referred to as "Wolf". Inspector Koichi Zenigata is erroneously named "Keibu Zenigata," likely due to a translation error (keibu being the Japanese title for a police inspector). The UK release followed on 10 June 1996 by Manga Video. Optimum Releasing re-released Cagliostro in the UK after Manga Entertainment lost its licence in the UK. The new DVD features an anamorphic widescreen print with the original Japanese audio track as well as the Streamline dub, both in stereo.

On 25 April 2000, Manga released the film on home video in the United States with a newly commissioned dub that adhered closer to the original script with the correct names restored. The DVD preserves the film in its original aspect ratio of 1.85:1 widescreen and is non-anamorphic. It additionally features remastered audio and picture, but contains no extras. The same company later released a new special edition DVD of Cagliostro on 29 August 2006. The disc is double-sided with the film on side A and the extras on side B. It includes a new digital transfer; Manga's English dub in 2.0 and 5.1 surround plus Japanese, Spanish, and French language tracks in mono; the complete film in storyboard format, accompanied by Japanese audio with English subtitles; an original Japanese trailer; a sketch and still gallery; a 26-minute interview with animation director Yasuo Ōtsuka, and animated menus. The film is presented in 16:9 anamorphic widescreen; however, the opening credits have been heavily re-edited to remove the Japanese credits, instead using selected still-frames of scenes that appear without Japanese writing. The English-translated names are superimposed over these stills. This change was negatively received by fans of the film. Both DVD releases are out-of-print, with Manga no longer owning the U.S. film rights.

In December 2008, the film was released on Blu-ray in Japan. Its video format is MPEG-4 AVC and its digitally-remastered audio is improved over that of the DVD, but contains no English audio or subtitle options despite being in Region A format. Years later, a new HD digital remaster was produced and Cagliostro was given a limited theatrical re-release in Japan on 9 May 2014. The remaster was released both individually and as part of The Collected Works of Hayao Miyazaki, a box set containing all of Miyazaki's movies. Both these newer releases were released by Studio Ghibli in conjunction with Disney. StudioCanal released a Blu-ray and DVD bundle of the film on 12 November 2012 in the UK. The StudioCanal release is of superior quality with its new high definition transfer, but the credits for the film are absent.

North American anime distributor Discotek Media announced on 26 March 2014 that they had licensed the film and planned to release it on DVD in 2014, with a Blu-ray release to follow at a then-unspecified future date. The DVD version was eventually delayed to 6 January 2015 and included the Streamline and Animaze/Manga dubs, a "Family Friendly" alternate version of the Animaze/Manga dub with reduced profanity, the original Japanese audio with newly translated English subtitles, an alternate subtitle option based on the subtitles used by TMS in their 1980 screenings of the film, a collection of alternate opening and closing sequences to the film from previous releases, translation notes, two trailers and a fan-made audio commentary by Reed Nelson. The Blu-ray was released on 23 June 2015 and featured the same extras in addition to another alternate subtitle option using a literal translation of the film's screenplay, new interviews with Lupin's English actors Bob Bergen and David Hayter, an introduction to the film by Hayter, translated past interviews from the French Blu-ray (featuring Yasuo Ōtsuka, Kazuhide Tomonaga and Monkey Punch), an optional storyboard viewing mode, a slideshow gallery of production and promotional art, and a text-based overview of the film's production history. Plans to include an emulated port of Cliff Hanger as an extra feature for the Blu-ray were dropped when the original contracts for the game could not be found.

Walt Disney Studios Home Entertainment would later release The Castle of Cagliostro in The Collected Works of Hayao Miyazaki, which released on November 17th, 2015. This release only features the Streamline dub and the Japanese audio with English subtitles; none of the extras from Discotek's releases are included.

A 4K UHD remaster of the film by VAP was released in Japan on 24 July 2019. Alongside that release in the United States, Discotek Media released a 4K UHD version on 26 January 2021 with a new Japanese audio track in 7.1 surround sound and an improved mix of the Animaze/Manga dub.

In 2025, the film received its first theatrical release in English, by Crunchyroll and Discotek Media, with a new English dub featuring the same voice actors as other Lupin III films. The theatrical release was followed by a Blu-ray edition containing the new dub as well as all previous English dubs.

== Reception ==
While the film was not initially a box-office success, it developed a cult following through numerous re-releases and was even voted as "the best anime in history" by the readers of Animage in November 2001. Following a July 1992 release by Streamline Pictures, Janet Maslin said she thought the film "should fare nearly as well [as Akira] with animation fans of any age, provided they are unwavering in their devotion to the form and do not think 100 minutes is an awfully long time." According to Maslin, the film is an "interestingly wild hybrid of visual styles and cultural references" whose "animation is weak when it comes to fluid body movements, but outstanding in its attention to detail." According to Marc Savlov of The Austin Chronicle, "C of C refrains from the Technicolor ultra-violence that helped make films like Golgo 13, Akira, and Vampire Hunter D such audience favorites, and instead focuses on broad, almost slapstick humor and chaos to keep viewers riveted. Sometimes it works, and unfortunately, sometimes it doesn't."

On the review aggregator website Rotten Tomatoes, 96% of 23 critics' reviews are positive, with an average rating of 7.7/10. According to Metacritic, which compiled 7 reviews and calculated an average rating of 72 out of 100, the film received "generally favorable reviews". Some fans maintain that it is not a "true" Lupin title, due to Miyazaki's altering of the titular character into a bumbling hero, rather than his original ruthless criminal self. Monkey Punch, creator of Lupin III, called Castle of Cagliostro an "excellent" film, but agreed Miyazaki's vision of Lupin differs from his own.

The film received the Ōfuji Noburō Award from the 1979 Mainichi Film Concours. Cagliostro, the country and setting, is depicted in meticulous detail and unconstrained by limitations of architecture, geography and culture, which can be described as "akogare no Paris" (Paris of our dreams), which is a fantastical view of Europe through Eastern eyes. The use of unexpected and unique camera angles and attention to individual movement of the characters are distinctive signatures of Miyazaki's style, including the opening heist scene which provides characterization and spirit to understanding the character of Lupin. The changes made to the portrayal of the cast, depicting a heroic and selfless Lupin, a friendly Jigen, funny Goemon, and un-sexualized Fujiko, were initially not well received by fans. Otaku USA's Surat compared this shift to "a James Bond movie where [James Bond] stayed at Motel 6 and his 'Bond mobile' was a Toyota Camry!"

The film was the best selling anime DVD in May 2001, and the third best selling in June. Both of Manga Entertainment's releases of The Castle of Cagliostro received DVD Talk Collector Series recommendation status, the highest status given by the review website DVDtalk.com. In January 2001, the Japanese magazine Animage elected Castle of Cagliostro the 9th best anime production of all time. Chris Beveridge of AnimeOnDVD.com gave the film a grade of "A+", although he disliked Manga Entertainment's use of PG-13 level language in the English dub. The Castle of Cagliostro placed in 5th place on Japan's Agency for Cultural Affairs's list of best anime. The film was named The Best Japanese Animated Film of All Time by Japanese film magazine Kinema Junpo in 2009. In 2020, CBR.com ranked The Castle of Cagliostro as the best Lupin movie.

=== Legacy ===
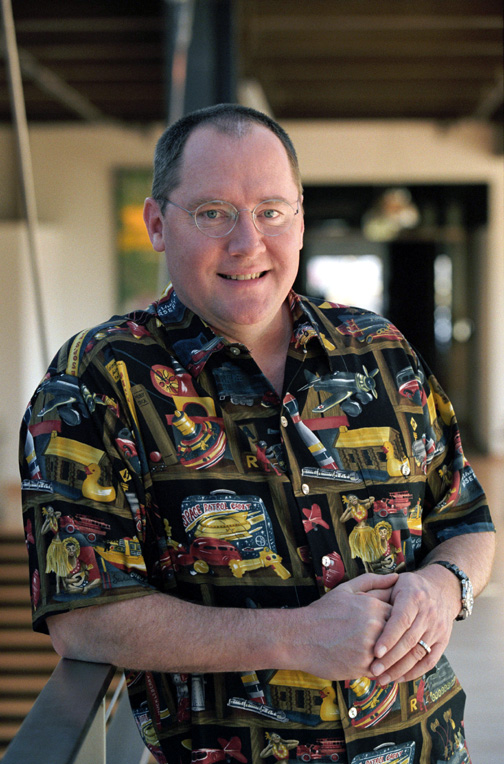
John Lasseter (pictured in 2002) has stated that "[The Castle of Cagliostro] was a tremendous inspiration for me and it had a tremendous impact on me."

Several critics have noted similarities between The Castle of Cagliostro and the Indiana Jones films, particularly the first entry Raiders of the Lost Ark (1981). These similarities include a rollicking adventure, humorous tone, similar overall action style, treasure hunting plot, a clever protagonist (Lupin and Indiana Jones) thrown into very difficult situations, overcoming obstacles with his wits, the use of gadgets, the help of several competent sidekicks, and a high-speed car chase down winding mountain roads. This has led to rumours, though unconfirmed, that the film may have influenced the Indiana Jones franchise. However, both the script and most of the filming for Raiders of the Lost Ark was completed by early 1981, years before The Castle of Cagliostro first became available in English.

In 1983, TMS Entertainment and Stern Electronics wanted to capitalize on the success of animated laserdisc video games at the time. They released the arcade game, Cliff Hanger, which used footage from this film, along with the previous Lupin film Mystery of Mamo. Even though the films themselves weren't available in North America at the time, the Cliff Hanger game was featured in an episode of the 1980s game show Starcade. The arcade game also made an appearance in The Goonies (1985)..

The character of Clarisse has been cited as a potential ancestral example of moe character design.

Cagliostro deeply influenced Pixar Animation Studios co-founder John Lasseter, along with Miyazaki's later films; in October 2014, Lasseter delivered a keynote address to the Tokyo International Film Festival describing how Miyazaki's influence upon his own life and work began when he first saw a clip from Cagliostro.

Walt Disney Animation Studios' 1986 film The Great Mouse Detective, co-directed by John Musker and Ron Clements, paid homage to Cagliostro with the film's climactic Big Ben sequence. The two-minute climax scene used computer-generated imagery (CGI), making it the first Disney film to extensively use computer animation, a fact that Disney used to promote the film during marketing. In turn, The Great Mouse Detective paved the way for the Disney Renaissance.

Another reference to the clock-tower fight is in "The Clock King" episode of Batman: The Animated Series. In the original video animation (OVA) Here Is Greenwood, students set a play where the scene of Lupin saving Clarisse on the clock tower is re-enacted.

Gary Trousdale, co-director of Disney's Atlantis: The Lost Empire, said that a scene at the end of Atlantis, where the waters recede from the sunken city, was directly inspired from the ending in Cagliostro. One of the sequence directors of The Simpsons Movie also mentioned Cagliostro as an influence; a brief shot where Bart Simpson rolls down the roof of the family house was inspired by Lupin running down the castle roof during his rescue attempt.

The 2019 film Lupin III: The First was inspired by The Castle of Cagliostro. The director Takashi Yamazaki found the tone in The Castle of Cagliostro as the best portrayal for the 3D film. Yamazaki was profoundly moved by The Castle of Cagliostro ever since he saw the film on TV in the 1980s. The experience entrenched in himself the idea that Japan can make high-quality films. The moment influenced the direction for the current film. Therefore, the movie is constructed around the model of Cagliostro with many homages added. The ending's emotional climax is similar to the climax in Cagliostro.

== See also ==
- Alessandro Cagliostro
