= Moldiver =

Japanese OVA anime series

- Cover art from the DVD release of Moldiver

モルダイバー (Morudaibā)
- Genre: Adventure, comedy, magical girl
- Original video animation
- Directed by: Hiroyuki Kitazume
- Studio: AIC; Pioneer LDC
- Licensed by: NA: Pioneer Entertainment
- Released: February 25, 1993 – November 25, 1993
- Runtime: 30 minutes
- Episodes: 6
- Manga
- Written by: Shimpei Itoh
- Published by: Tokuma Shoten
- Imprint: Shōnen Captain Comics Special
- Original run: June 1993 – July 1994
- Volumes: 3
- icon

Moldiver (モルダイバー, Morudaibā) is a six-episode 1993 OVA anime series. It is a parody of magical girl and superhero anime series.

The series in part resembles the basic premise of the DC Comics superhero Hourman. An inventor finds a way to grant superhuman abilities to individuals, but these abilities only last for a very short timespan (60 minutes for Hourman, 11 minutes for this series). The inventor creates a superhero alter ego for himself, but his sister tampers with the power-granting device and creates a more feminine superhero costume. She reluctantly becomes a superheroine in order to stop the schemes of a malicious roboticist, the roboticist's private army of destructive robots and androids, and the attacks of her own younger brother, who chose a supervillain career because he dislikes both of his heroic siblings.

== Plot ==
The plot focuses on a young girl by the name of Mirai Ozora, living in Tokyo in 2045. Being obsessed with her hobbies of shopping and modeling, one would never expect her big brother Hiroshi to be a brilliant inventor for ZIC, a major technological corporation.

It all begins with Hiroshi's invention of the "Mol-Unit", a device capable of allowing an object to operate outside of the normal laws of physics. Flight, super-speed and strength, invulnerability, all capable through the Mol-Unit's power. The only catch, however, is that it can only stay active for a limited time, only 666 seconds (just over 11 minutes).

Such a device would have changed the world on a whole, but Hiroshi's motives for its invention are not so much for the world as it is for his own ego. Using the Mol-Unit and its power, Hiroshi develops a new superheroic personality for himself, Captain Tokyo.

After his initial debut, "Captain Tokyo" becomes a media sensation, and Hiroshi eats it up. However, things backfire when, out of curiosity, Mirai finds the Mol-Unit and tampers with the costume it generates, giving it a more feminine appearance. In doing so, the Mol-Unit malfunctions, causing the costume to randomly alter between Hiroshi's design and Mirai's. Upon realizing this, Hiroshi is forced to lend the Mol-Unit to Mirai, whose own personal use for the device seems to be more lighthearted than her brother's.

However, things are not right in Tokyo. A mysterious man by the name of "Dr. Machinegal" (actually an old friend and teacher of Hiroshi's, Professor Amagi) and his personal robot army, among them the destructive android group known as the "Machinegal Dolls" (all named after famous models and actresses) is bent on causing havoc upon the world. To make matters worse, Nozumu, the youngest of the Ozora siblings, has developed his own Mol-Unit and created a supervillain persona to oppose his brother and sister out of spite. Completely unaware of such events at first, but obligated to do something, Mirai finds herself thrown into the world of superheroism, which she takes in stride.

== Episodes and home releases ==
No.	Title	Japanese release date	English release date
1	"Metamorforce!"	February 25, 1993	June 1, 1994
2	"Overzone"	March 25, 1993	June 29, 1994
3	"Longing"	June 25, 1993	July 27, 1994
4	"Destruction"	August 25, 1993	September 7, 1994
5	"Intruder"	September 25, 1993	September 28, 1994
6	"Verity"	November 25, 1993	October 26, 1994

The word "Moldiver" is spelt out using the first letter of the first five episode titles and the first three letters of the episode title for episode six (Metamorforce!, Overzone, Longing, Destruction, Intruder, Verity).

Moldiver was originally released on VHS and LaserDisc in dubbed and subtitled versions by Pioneer LDC between June 1, 1994, and October 26, 1994. All six episodes were later released by Pioneer on one dual-layered DVD in 2001.

== Other appearances ==
The OVA was later followed by a Moldiver manga by Shinpei Itou (the writer of Hyper Doll), which ran in "Shōnen Captain".

Moldiver also makes a cameo appearance in episode 8 of the Tenchi Universe series, "No Need for a Genius". In it, Moldiver is Mihoshi's favorite TV show.

== Soundtrack ==
- Opening: Go! Go! Moldiver (Japanese version performed by Yukana Nogami, English version performed by Molly Pasutti)
- Ending: Time Limit (Japanese version performed by Yukana Nogami, English version performed by Molly Pasutti)
- Insert song (episode 2): Falling in Love in the 20th Century (Japanese version performed by Nariko Fujieda, English version performed by Molly Pasutti)

== Voice cast ==
- Mirai Ozora: Yukana Nogami (Japanese), Julia Kato (English)
- Hiroshi Ozora: Toshiyuki Morikawa (Japanese), David Hayter (English)
- Nozomu Ozora: Rica Matsumoto (Japanese), Joshua Seth (English)
- Professor Amagi / Dr. Machinegal: Jouji Yanami (Japanese), Doug Stone (English)
- Mao Shirase: Akiko Hiramatsu (Japanese), Melissa Fahn (English)
- Isabelle: Emi Shinohara (Japanese), Susan Byrkett (English)
- Sayuri: Izumi Kikuchi (Japanese), Heidi Lenhart (English)
- Nastassja: Kaoru Shimamura (Japanese), Debra Jean Rogers (English)
- Brooke: Kikuko Inoue (Japanese), Mari Devon (English)
- Vivien: Kumiko Nishihara (Japanese), Dorothy Elias-Fahn (English)
- Elizabeth: Yumiko Shibata (Japanese), Wendee Lee (English)
- Jennifer: Yuri Amano (Japanese), Mimi Woods (English)
- Kaoru Misaki: Kiyoyuki Yanada (Japanese), Steven Blum (English)
- Amy Lean: Nariko Fujieda (Japanese)
