= Wuyuntana =

Mongolian singer

Wuyuntana (simplified Chinese: 乌云塔娜; traditional Chinese: 烏雲塔娜; pinyin: Wūyúntǎnà, Mongolian: Уюнтана / ᠣᠶᠣᠨᠲᠠᠨᠠ, romanized: Uyuntana), known in Japan as Uyontana (ウヨンタナ, uyontana), is a Mongolian singer from the Horqin district of Tongliao, Inner Mongolia, China. She has been living in Japan since 1987 and has contributed vocals to a variety of anime including Macross Plus, Shamanic Princess, Betterman and the first Cardcaptor Sakura movie.

== Albums ==
- Khorchin (ホルチン, 1998)
- Ten no Kabe (天の壁, 2001)
