= Breakdown (video game) =

2004 video game

- Developer: Namco
- Publishers: JP: Namco; NA: Namco Hometek; EU: Electronic Arts
- Director: Masafumi Shibano
- Producer: Hirofumi Kami
- Designer: Ryouji Ichikari
- Programmer: Kazushige Watanabe
- Artist: Masataka Shimono
- Writers: Masahide Kito; Akira Uematsu; Takehiro Imai
- Composers: Yoshihito Yano; Yoshinori Kawamoto
- Platform: Xbox
- Release: JP: January 29, 2004; NA: March 16, 2004; EU: June 18, 2004
- Genre: Action-adventure
- Mode: Single-player

Breakdown (ブレイクダウン, Bureikudaun) is a 2004 action-adventure game developed and published by Namco for the Xbox. In 2018, Microsoft announced it would be available via backwards compatibility on the Xbox One. The game received mixed reviews from critics.

== Gameplay ==
Although Breakdown is a first-person action game, it integrates elements of a fighting game and uses auto-lock for shooting enemies. The viewpoint is always the player's, and interaction with objects is realistic: ammunition is picked up by looking down and grabbing it (instead of walking over it), doors are opened by grabbing the handle, key cards are used by swiping them over a scanner and ladders climbed by using one's arms. Health and energy are replenished by consuming energy bars, hamburgers, and sodas.

== Plot ==
An underground complex, known to humanity as Site Zero, has been discovered in Japan and seems to be the cause of increased earthquake activity. It was built by mysterious forces and is controlled by a being known as Nexus. A research facility is established to study the complex and its inhabitants, the T'lan. As the game begins, there have been minor skirmishes between humans and the seemingly invincible T'lan.

Protagonist Derrick Cole has developed amnesia from an injection of T'langen, a fluid recovered from Site Zero which was intended to create supersoldiers with T'lan abilities. He is in a recovery facility near Site Zero at the beginning of the war between the humans and Nexus, which overflows into the facility. Derrick is rescued by a mysterious woman named Alex Hendrickson, who seems to know him and is dismayed about his amnesia. As they make their escape, they are separated by an earthquake during an encounter with T'lan warriors. As they go their separate ways, Derrick's new abilities manifest and he is able to break through the T'lan energy shields, much like Alex can. The two eventually reunite and encounter Solus, a human-like T'lan who defeats both Derrick and Alex with ease before running off to complete a different objective.

Derrick and Alex learn of an evacuation helicopter on the roof of the building and plan to use it to escape the hostile soldiers and T'lan. However, the U.S. military destroys the helicopter and Derrick and Alex escape to the Terminus 4 research facility, where they encounter the Beta Project test subjects. These are children who have been slowly injected with small amounts of T'langen over a long period of time to give them the same abilities as Derrick. Alex recognizes one named Ernest and calls out to him, promising that help is on the way. Further into the research center, they meet Stefania Wojinski, a neurologist specializing in memory loss and recovery, who has had her project funding terminated. After a brief discussion with her about Derrick's memory, the two are greeted by Chief Researcher Glen Ogawa. They learn that Nexus is planning a massive attack on humanity. Glen gives Derrick an additional injection of T'langen known as "accelerator", boosting his physical capabilities and giving him new powers.

Departing to Site Zero, Derrick and Alex are separated again and they both agree to regroup at the entrance. Along the way, Derrick encounters USMC Lieutenant Gianni deLuca and his squad, equipped with anti-T'lan lasers. Derrick learns from Gianni that Nexus is planning on deploying its T'lan troops all over the Earth using crystal rockets, and it is Gianni's mission is to stop them. Gianni and his squad plan to join up with another unit. While Gianni and his squad have a different goal, other squads are ordered to shoot Derrick on sight. The two part ways and Derrick travels to Site Zero on foot. Traveling into Terminus' sewer system, Derrick is interrupted by Solus, who has been ordered to stop him from entering Site Zero. Narrowly escaping, Derrick reunites with Alex and the two head into the complex.

Inside the complex, the two learn from Gianni that Stefania stole a valuable disk containing all of Terminus 4's research on Site Zero and the T'lan, deleting all backups. The U.S. military wants the information, so they send in a team to retrieve the disk before they order a nuclear strike. Deep into Site Zero, Alex is captured by Solus. As Derrick makes his way through alone, he witnesses Stefania's execution after she turns the data over to the military. Derrick travels on foot to the silos but arrives to find Gianni's squad decimated. The rockets are launched, and the T'lan are scattered all over the world. Derrick enters the heart of Site Zero to stop Nexus but is challenged by Solus. During the fight, Solus kills Alex, and the U.S. military launches a nuclear strike in a last-ditch effort to destroy Site Zero. The resulting explosion reacts with Solus' shield and Derrick is sent 15 years into the future.

Derrick awakes in a device designed by Stefania, and it is revealed that the device was used to piece together Derrick's fragmented memories. Derrick finds himself in a dystopian future controlled by the T'lan. A group of Terminus 4 scientists explains that Derrick will experience the "pendulum effect", swinging him back in time to shortly before he left. This will allow him to relive events, and hopefully, prevent the rockets' launch. Traveling through the complex to reach Glen, Derrick finds Alex. They meet Glen, who reveals that although they failed to stop the launch 15 years before, they had time to further refine T'langen. The "ultra accelerator" injection gives Derrick the power he needs to change the past. As the pendulum effect begins, Alex accompanies Derrick to the present, knowing she will be killed by Solus. They are separated in the pendulum-effect tunnel and arrive at different times. Derrick arrives moments after Alex is captured by Solus, while Alex is sent to the recovery facility at the moment where she rescued Derrick, facilitating Derrick's journey at the beginning of the game.

Derrick saves Stefania before she is thrown off a ledge, and uses an elevator to take him deep into the silos, allowing him to reach Gianni's squad in a timely manner. Derrick defeats Solus, saves Alex and destroys Nexus, ending the T'lan threat. Derrick and Alex escape from Site Zero as it collapses. In a helicopter above the site with Stefania and Gianni, Alex questions the future; since she is still alive, the future has been divided into two separate timelines. As the pendulum effect begins to throw Alex into the future she jumps out of the helicopter to avoid dragging the others with her. Derrick has a choice: remaining in his own time or following her to destroy Nexus in her timeline. If Derrick chooses to go with Alex, they both go to an unknown future. If Derrick chooses to stay in the past, then, after the ending credits, a message from Dr. Ogawa appears saying that Alex has died alone.

== Characters ==
- Derrick Cole: A former combat soldier skilled in firearms and hand-to-hand combat, he is the only survivor of 10 Alpha Project test subjects who received large intravenous doses of T'langen; because of this, he is capable of fighting the T'Lan. His out-of-place environments, such as a desert, are fragments of older memories used to fill the gaps in his memory of the T'Lan offensive.
- Alex Hendrickson: A physically-capable and determined woman, who can fight with guns and knives. She is a member of the facility's Beta Project, a more-successful project which looks for gradual results instead of those from one injection. While traveling through the facility, Derrick remembers seeing a young Alex as a test subject in a room with other children.
- Glen Ogawa: A Japanese-American professor of medicine, after conducting biological research in Australia he was banned from the medical community for creating a human clone. He is now involved in a classified project. Glen spearheaded experiments in augmenting soldiers to supersoldiers, with military support, and processes the T'langen given to Derrick.
- Stefania Wojinski: A visiting professor from Poland and memory specialist, whose recent project was canceled. Embittered by this, she deleted and appropriated data from her employers' hard drives.
- Gianni de Luca: An Italian-American Marine first lieutenant, he leads an elite unit specializing in top-secret missions. Colorfully-spoken, he is a good, passionate person who is cool under fire. Although Gianni is deployed by the army looking for Derrick, Gianni answers to a higher authority and is tasked with a secret mission to reach Nexus and prevent the launch of the T'lan rockets.
- Solus: A powerful T'lan leader and avatar of Nexus. He meets Derrick and Alex in the Botanical Research Facility, incapacitating both. Solus later meets Derrick underground, and the latter can only run. In Site Zero, he kidnaps Alex and interrogates her. As Derrick frees her, Solus seems to be defeated but kills Alex. After a nuclear explosion, a reaction with his shield energy and sends Derrick into the future.

== Backwards compatibility ==
While already available via backwards compatibility on the Xbox 360, Microsoft announced on April 10, 2018 that backwards compatibility would be supported for Breakdown on Xbox One from April 17, 2018. Physical discs will be playable on the system, while available on the Xbox Live Store as a digital download.

== Reception ==
Reception

Aggregate score
Aggregator	Score
Metacritic	71/100

Review scores
Publication	Score
Edge	5/10
Electronic Gaming Monthly	8/10
Eurogamer	5/10
Famitsu	27/40
Game Informer	7.5/10
GamePro	4/5
GameRevolution	D+
GameSpot	7.6/10
GameSpy	3/5
GameZone	7.5/10
IGN	6.7/10
Official Xbox Magazine (US)	8.5/10
The Cincinnati Enquirer	3.5/5
The Times	4/5

Breakdown received "mixed or average" reviews from critics, according to the review aggregator website Metacritic. In Japan, Famitsu gave it a score of three sevens and one six for a total of 27 out of 40.

David Chen, writing for Xbox-gaming magazine Xbox Nation, said, "Hardcore gamers ... will find Breakdown suffers from a few too many design flaws," but praised the game, saying: "In spite of any ... shortcomings, Breakdown is an enormously compelling, satisfying game." IGN's Hilary Goldstein criticized the game for boring level design and clunky gameplay mechanics but praised it for its solid voice acting and deep story.

The Times gave the game four stars out of five, saying, "The graphics are strong and shot from a realistic firstperson point of view, which adds to the disorientation while at the same time immersing you in the story." Playboy gave it 75%, saying, "Even noncombat activities are seen from Cole's view, whether he's eating a cheeseburger or ogling his sexy sidekick. Brilliant." However, The Cincinnati Enquirer gave it three-and-a-half stars out of five, saying, "Fans of run 'n' gun games and arcade-fighting titles likely will find that Breakdown is a uniquely enjoyable -- though visually dizzying -- single-player tale."

In 2009, GamesRadar+ included it in its list of games "with untapped franchise potential", saying: "Breakdown got a lot of attention for its originality (first person fistfights!) and bizarre plot (time traveling alien super-soldiers!). Official Xbox Magazine went so far as to claim that Breakdown's story was better than Halo."
