= Melodie Sexton =

American R&B singer

- Genres: R&B; soul
- Occupation: Singer
- Instrument: Vocals
- Label: Sony Music Records

Melodie Sexton is an American R&B singer.

== Overview ==
Born in New York, Sexton started singing at the age of 3 at her father's church. She went on to become a professional singer who delivered back up vocals to artists such as Salt and Pepa, Living Colour and Brenda K. Starr. She eventually moved to Japan in 1990. Sexton released her debut album entitled Beautiful Dream in 1992 upon Sony Music Records.

She eventually went on to collaborate with Japanese House Music group GTS. Sexton at first sang with GTS upon a 1996 cover of Chaka Khan's Through The Fire which rose to 47 upon Japan's Tokio Hot 100 chart. She again paired with GTS upon the 1998 single Brand New World which rose to 37 upon the US Billboard Dance Club Songs chart. Sexton later featured as a vocalist upon Japanese R&B singer Ai's 2007 album Don't Stop Ai. The album debuted at number four on the Japanese Oricon Albums chart and was eventually certified gold by the RIAJ.
