= Silent Bomber =

1999 video game

- North American cover art
- Developer: CyberConnect
- Publishers: WW: Bandai; EU: Studio 3
- Director: Hiroto Niizato
- Designer: Takayuki Isobe
- Composers: Chikayo Fukuda; Seizo Nakata
- Platform: PlayStation
- Release: JP: October 28, 1999; NA: February 29, 2000; EU: July 21, 2000
- Genre: Action
- Mode: Single-player multiplayer

Silent Bomber (Note: Japanese: サイレントボマー, Hepburn: Sairento Bomā) is a 1999 action video game developed by CyberConnect and published by Bandai for the PlayStation. Silent Bomber is based on the classic top down shoot 'em up genre but with a twist: Instead of shooting the enemy, the player blows them up using bombs. It was the second and last game to be developed by CyberConnect, after Tail Concerto, before they rebranded as CyberConnect2 in 2001. In 2006, it was released for the PlayStation Network in Japan.

== Gameplay ==
The player takes control of the protagonist, Jutah, whose mission is to attack and destroy the facilities and defenses of the colossal space dreadnought Dante. The player can either plant bombs simply where they stand, or by launching them using the lock-on reticle. Bombs that are launched at enemies also attach to their target. Bombs can then be detonated at any time at the player's discretion. This introduces the chaining element of gameplay, where the number of enemies simultaneously destroyed awards more points. Bombs can also be "stacked", and a larger number of bombs in the same place is more destructive. Jutah can set only a limited number of bombs at one time, so the set bombs must be detonated before more bombs can be set.

Jutah also has access to material liquids, which are enhanced bombs with special effects. Napalm continues to burn after it is detonated, damaging enemies within the flames. It is also more effective against biological enemies. Gravity forms a miniature black hole, sucking in nearby enemies. Paralysis temporarily disables electrical devices. It also does extra damage to mechanical enemies. Material liquids can also be stacked and chained with standard bombs.

Jutah can upgrade the number of bombs he can plant before needing to detonate them, the range of his bomb-planting hologram and his resistance to enemy attack by using E-Chips hidden throughout the levels. Jutah's E-Chips can be configured at any time to adapt his skills to different situations.

In keeping with arcade style tradition, many levels end with a powerful boss that Jutah must destroy or repel to move on through the game's 14 levels.

== Plot ==
The game begins with Jutah Fate, a war criminal, being drafted into a covert military operation by his home planet of Hornet. Seven years prior, he was ordered to destroy an enemy stronghold, only to find that there are civilians inside. Due to the trauma of having to follow his orders, he is largely devoid of emotions. The mission is to destroy a space cruiser, known as the Dante, that is threatening the planet. Also part of the mission are Benoit Manderubrot, a political criminal; Micino Tifone, a spy; and John Loss, an escape artist and member of an oppressed tribe. The operation is headed by CO Annri Ohara.

Upon arrival at the Dante, their ship is shot down by Dante's anti-aircraft weapons. Everyone lands on the cruiser unharmed, but Jutah is separated from the group. As the game progresses and Jutah is asked to destroy various parts of Dante, Jutah and Annri begin to develop feelings for each other.

Finally, Jutah reaches Dante's bridge, but finds that the crew was killed by its own defenses. A hologram of Benoit appears and reveals that it was he who killed the crew, and that he had taken control of the ship and still planned to destroy Hornet. After Jutah refuses to join with Benoit, Benoit tries to kill Jutah by ejecting him into space. He is rescued by his crew as Benoit seals off Dante.

Jutah breaks back into the ship and destroys Dante's powerful cannon in time to save Hornet. With the cannon gone, Jutah finds Benoit in the ship's core, and discovers that Benoit has bonded himself to the Dante's AI. After the final battle, Benoit activates Dante's self-destruct system. Jutah tries to get back to his ship, but his way is blocked, forcing the others to leave without him. The game ends with Jutah visiting Annri at her home three years later.

== Characters ==
- Jutah Fate: A genetically engineered man created by the military government Tarakhan and based on the planet controlled by it and named for it-Tarakhan-as part of its Elite Fighter Engineering Project. He was trained as a military weapon, specialising in spying, assassination, and demolition. He lived only to destroy. Then the military government collapsed, and he was sentenced to 30 decades in prison. There, he had a mental breakdown. Now, he's fighting for his freedom.
- Annri Ohara: An elite military officer and computer specialist that graduated from the military academy at the head of her class. Annri sought fulfillment in the Hornet government maintaining planet-wide peace. But, after joining the Hornet army, she discovered there were problems with the government, as with any large institution. Annri is the only member of Operation Toroy from the Hornet Military.
- Benoit Manderubrot: An international political criminal and chess master who has joined and led seven major revolutions. Benoit assumed a different identity and embraced a different ideology for each conflict. He believes that revolution is like chess, and uses people as game pieces. He volunteered for Operation Toroy. Benoit is considered the most mysterious member of the troop, his ability as a soldier exceeding even Jutah's.
- Micino Tifone: A professional spy who will do anything for money. Micino has stolen state secrets by seducing government officials with her beauty. Her strong points are her physical strength and cat-like agility, and her uncanny sixth sense.
- John Loss: A hero, he uses guerrilla tactics to fight for the liberation of the oppressed Nufu tribe, a 'primitive' tribe held in government "preservation". He agreed to join Operation Toroy on condition that the tribe be freed. His character is described as intelligent and quiet, but once he's on the battlefield, his bravery and ferocity are unmatched.
- Tim Palmer: The youngest member of the mission, Tim is a brilliant and resourceful pilot. He needs only a few minutes to master any vehicle. He gets his nickname "Mr. Escape" from his previous career of breaking prisoners out of jail. He's a talented weapons operator and is master of the hasty retreat.

== Reception ==
Reception

Aggregate score
Aggregator	Score
GameRankings	81%

Review scores
Publication	Score
Electronic Gaming Monthly	7.625/10 (Note: Three critics of Electronic Gaming Monthly gave the game each a score of 7.5/10, and another gave it 8/10 in an early review.)
EP Daily	8/10
Eurogamer	9/10
Famitsu	29/40
Game Informer	7.75/10
GameFan	(J.W.) 88% 87% (Note: In GameFan's viewpoint of the game, three critics gave it each a score of 90, 80, and 91.)
GameSpot	8.2/10
IGN	8/10
Next Generation	4/5
Official U.S. PlayStation Magazine	4/5

The game received favorable reviews according to the review aggregation website GameRankings. In an early review, Jeff Lundrigan of NextGen called it "An engrossing, challenging game with a very different approach than most." In Japan, Famitsu gave it a score of 29 out of 40.

The D-Pad Destroyer of GamePro said of the game in one review, "Silent Bomber is just the thing for action gamers looking for something different. It's challenging enough to keep veterans busy, but the controls are simple enough to rope in casual gamers. If you've got an old-school action itch and want to try something different, this game is da bomb." (Note: GamePro gave the game three 4.5/5 scores for graphics, sound, and fun factor, and 5/5 for control in one review.) In another review, Major Mike said, "Gamers looking for a fun action game that's easy to pick up will be served well by Silent Bomber. It doesn't have the deep story line of Resident Evil 3: Nemesis or Syphon Filter 2, but, as an amusing time-killer, it gets the job done." (Note: GamePro gave the game all 4/5 scores for graphics, sound, control, and fun factor in another review.)
