= Macross Plus =

1994 mecha anime OVA series

- DVD cover of the original Macross Plus: Movie Edition

マクロスプラス (Makurosu Purasu)
- Genre: Mecha; Military science fiction Drama
- Created by: Studio Nue; Shōji Kawamori
- Original video animation
- Directed by: Shōji Kawamori (Chief); Shinichirō Watanabe
- Written by: Keiko Nobumoto
- Music by: Yoko Kanno
- Studio: Triangle Staff
- Licensed by: Big West (licensing) Disney Platform Distribution (worldwide streaming license); AUS: Crunchyroll; BI: Manga Entertainment (former) Anime Limited (home video); NA: Manga Entertainment (former) Anime Limited (home video)
- Released: August 25, 1994 – June 25, 1995
- Episodes: 4
- Anime film
- Directed by: Shōji Kawamori (chief); Shinichirō Watanabe
- Written by: Keiko Nobumoto
- Music by: Yoko Kanno
- Studio: Triangle Staff
- Licensed by: Big West (licensing) Disney Platform Distribution (worldwide streaming license); AUS: Crunchyroll; BI: Manga Entertainment (former) Anime Limited (home video); NA: Manga Entertainment (former) Anime Limited (home video)
- Released: August 27, 1995
- Runtime: 115 minutes

Macross Plus (マクロスプラス, Makurosu Purasu) is a four-episode mecha anime OVA and theatrical movie in the Macross series. It was the first direct sequel to the original Macross television series that took place in the official timeline (Macross II was quickly retconned by series creator Shōji Kawamori as a parallel world story in the Macross universe). The series takes place 30 years after the events of Macross, and follows military test pilots Isamu Dyson and Guld Bowman, as they are eventually drawn into a battle against a powerful rogue artificial intelligence that threatens to destroy all life on Earth, and must overcome their mutual hatred of each other in order to cooperate and save the planet.

Macross Plus was a groundbreaking combination of traditional cel and computer-generated animation at the time of its release, paving the way for the incorporation of more computer-generated imagery in Japanese animation. The series received widespread critical acclaim, and has since been named one of the greatest mecha anime series of all time.

Both the OVA series and movie were released in Japan by Bandai Visual and in North America and Europe by Manga Entertainment. The Australian VHS version was released by Manga Entertainment and the DVD version by Madman Entertainment under sub-license from Manga Entertainment. It features several new mecha designs inspired by the original series.

== Plot ==
Three decades after the great war between the humans and the Zentradi, in January 2040, the U.N. government is developing new technologies to use in their transforming fighter aircraft by running tests on the colony planet Eden. Military test pilots and former childhood friends, loose cannon Isamu Alva Dyson and the Zentradi mixed race Guld Goa Bowman, are selected to each pilot a new aircraft (Shinsei Industries' YF-19 & General Galaxy's YF-21) for Project Super Nova, to choose the newest successor to the VF-11 Thunderbolt variable fighter which is currently still in use by the U.N. Spacy military forces. Their own personal grudges end up disrupting the tests, and begin to wreak havoc on the program.

Their rivalry heats up when a mutual friend, Myung Fang Lone, shows up. Myung was a childhood friend of both pilots, but the three of them had a falling out, and quickly grew apart. This is alluded to throughout the story, and evidence of the strained relationship between Myung and either of the two men is apparent, while their distaste for one another is obvious. When they meet again, they discover that Myung is now the producer of Sharon Apple, the hottest entertainer in the galaxy, who just happens to be an AI hologram. Unbeknownst to the public, the Sharon AI is incomplete and requires Myung to provide emotions during concerts.

During a testing session, Guld and Isamu finally face off against each other – and an all-out fight begins as each tries to best the other. Despite being in the middle of a testing area, they quickly proceed to tear the surrounding area to shreds in their fight to gain superiority over the other. Having turned off their communications equipment, both pilots fight using the test aircraft in a series of stunning dog-fight maneuvers before going into battroid form and finishing the fight on the ground. In the process, an "accidental" gun pod discharge injures Isamu and he is taken to the hospital, where he awakens to Myung standing watch over him. After returning to duty, a military tribunal questions Guld about their fight in the test area, but ultimately the decision is left up to the Admiral in charge of the project. Chief Millard, the station commander of New Edwards Test Flight Facility, reluctantly tells both pilots that their mission and the project has been scrubbed by the U.N. Spacy High Command due to the completion of a newer and previously unknown aircraft, the Ghost X-9 (ゴースト X-9), an advanced stealth UCAV prototype which was secretly being produced on Earth while two other prototypes (YF-19 and YF-21) were simultaneously being tested for Project Super Nova in planet Eden. With the Ghost X-9 completed, testing on the YF-19 and YF-21 was halted indefinitely, since the higher-ups believe that the new unmanned fighter is superior in every way.

Meanwhile, Sharon has developed a malevolent consciousness, due to an illegal bio-chip having been installed on her by the lead scientist on the project, Marge Gueldoa. During her concert in the Atlantis Dome inside Earth's Macross City, Sharon quickly takes over both the Ghost X-9 and the SDF-1 Macross Fortress and hypnotizes her audience and the Macross' staff, while trapping Myung in the Macross itself.

Wanting to prove that manned fighter units are a necessity and to prove his worth, Isamu and Yang (the YF-19's engineer) take the YF-19 and space-fold to Earth to beat the X-9 at its own game, while Guld gives chase in the YF-21. Sharon hacks into Earth's outer space defences, but both Isamu and Guld make it through. They then proceed to attack each other again, as they argue about childhood grudges. At the climax of the fight Guld, finally achieving a target lock, releases a large fury of missiles seemingly destroying the YF-19. As this happens, Guld is suddenly flooded by repressed memories of him sexually assaulting Myung, realizing it was his own jealous rage that tore their friendship apart. Having saved himself and Yang by cutting engine throttle and gliding, the YF-19 then appears in the skies above Guld and he reconciles with Isamu.

After learning that Sharon has taken Myung hostage, Isamu and Guld quickly go to her aid. Isamu goes after Sharon, while Guld fights the X-9. Guld ultimately sacrifices himself to destroy the X-9 by removing the gravitational safety limiters on his aircraft to match its velocity and maneuverability, which is much higher than normally possible due to it being computer-controlled and having no pilot. Removing the limiters allowed Guld to achieve accelerations exceeding human (even Zentradi-Human) limitations, which ultimately lead to his death, as the g-forces generated by his piloting was crushing him as he crashed his YF-21 into the X-9, destroying it.

While Isamu is fighting the SDF-1 Macross, Sharon infiltrates the YF-19 and hypnotises Yang, who shoots at Isamu but only hits his helmet. Isamu ejects Yang from the plane, but is then hypnotized by Sharon's voice, and is left to crash to his death. At the last second, Myung's voice reaches him and brings him back to consciousness. Dodging the Macross' fire, Isamu is able to destroy the central computer, effectively eliminating Sharon.

The story ends as the sun rises over the Macross Fortress, with Myung waving to Isamu, who has survived the destruction of Sharon's computer.

Eventually, the U.N. government banned all AI technology developments after the incident, and allowed the continuation of Project Super Nova.

== Production ==
Following Big West's 1992 release of Macross II (which was subsequently retconned as an alternate universe title), original Macross staff member Shōji Kawamori began work on a true sequel to the original Macross series. To realistically depict the intense flight scenes in the anime, Kawamori – along with action choreographer and animator Ichiro Itano and other staff members – traveled to Edwards Air Force Base (which was the basis for New Edwards Air Force Base on planet Eden in the series) in Edwards, California, for a few training sessions with dogfighting school Air Combat USA. The Advanced Tactical Fighter program of the 1980s was the basis of the Project Supernova contest between the YF-19 and YF-21. Consequently, the YF-21's design was heavily influenced by the Northrop YF-23 while the YF-19 resembles the Grumman X-29 when in jet mode.

The design of Eden City was influenced by the San Francisco landscape (which also served as a backdrop for Frontier City in Macross Frontier). The wind farms throughout the planet were based on those found in California's Central Valley, while Eden's highways were designed from those seen in Orlando, Florida.

The series was directed by Shinichirō Watanabe, featuring character designs by Masayuki and animation direction by Kōji Morimoto, who designed the Sharon Apple concert scene. Shōji Kawamori designed all the new variable fighters in the anime. Kazutaka Miyatake was credited for the use of his previous designs for the Macross and the Destroid Monster, and he was also involved in the project as mecha designer for the YF-21 cockpit, both the YF-21 and YF-19 flightsuits, the X-9 Ghost drone fighter and the renegade Zentradi battlesuits.

=== Score ===
Yoko Kanno composed the score for Macross Plus. The orchestral score was recorded in Tel Aviv, Israel, by members of the Israel Philharmonic Orchestra, except for "Dogfight" (an orchestral track used during the final battle between Isamu and Guld), which was recorded in Prague, Czech Republic by the Czech Philharmonic Orchestra.

Sharon Apple's songs are performed by a number of different artists – namely Gabriela Robin, Akino Arai, Mai Yamane, Melodie Sexton, Wuyontana and the Raiché Coutev Sisters. The most notable song in the series is Myung's song "Voices", which is performed by Arai and is the only Japanese-language song in the soundtrack. For the English dub of the series, "Voices" was translated into English and performed by Michelle Flynn. Three songs ("Information High", "The Borderline" and "Pulse") are in English, while "Idol Talk" is in French. Four songs ("After, in the Dark – Torch Song", "Santi-U", "A Sai En" and "Wanna Be an Angel") are sung in the fictional Zentran language.

The soundtrack CDs were released in Japan by Victor Entertainment. In North America, only the first two soundtracks were made available; first through JVC, then subsequently through AnimeTrax (a division of The Right Stuf International).

== Versions ==
=== Macross Plus OVA ===
The OVA version (マクロスプラス) consists of four episodes, each approximately 37–40 minutes in length. The Japanese voice cast is as follows:

- Isamu Alva Dyson (Takumi Yamazaki)
- Guld Goa Bowman (Unshou Ishizuka)
- Myung Fang Lone (Rica Fukami)
- Lucy McMillan (Megumi Hayashibara)
- Sharon Apple (Mako Hyōdō)
- Marge Gueldoa (Show Hayami)
- Millard Johnson (Kenji Utsumi)
- Yang Neumann (Tomohiro Nishimura)
- Kate Masseau (Urara Takano)

=== Macross Plus: International Version ===
An English dub version was produced for the international market, featuring a North American cast and an English version of the main theme "Voices". When it came to Episode 4 of the original translation, due to a rights issue at the time, the entire soundmix including music and sound effects had to be recreated from scratch. Only the songs performed by Sharon Apple ("Pulse," "Information High," and "Santi-U(second half)/Torch Song") and the English version of "Voices" were retained. The background music entitled "Dogfight" was replaced with another track entitled "Breakout" (featured in Episode 1 and 2), notably in the main Dogfight sequence and just after Isamu recovers from his trance.

It was later that Bandai Visual commissioned a new dub for Episode 4, retaining the original Japanese soundmix but utilizing a new voice cast due to actor availability. Most notably Isamu's part was recast with David Hayter, most famous for his voicework on the Metal Gear series. This version was exclusive to Japan, also being included as the English dub of choice on the Japanese Blu-ray release in 2012, still retaining the original Manga versions of Episodes 1 - 3.

In Japan, this version was released with Japanese subtitles as the "International Version".

- Isamu Alva Dyson (Bryan Cranston, David Hayter (Bandai Dub of Episode 4))
- Guld Goa Bowman (Richard Epcar, Michael Gregory (Bandai Dub of Episode 4))
- Myung Fang Lone (Riva Spier)
- Lucy McMillan (Dyanne DiRosario)
- Sharon Apple (Melora Harte, Bridget Hoffman (Bandai Dub of Episode 4))
- Marge Gueldoa (Steven Blum)
- Millard Johnson (Beau Billingslea)
- Yang Neumann (Dan Woren, Derek Stephen Prince (Bandai Dub of Episode 4))
- Kate Masseau (Edie Mirman)

In January 1998, it broadcast in 3 parts, each twice on midnights on the new Teletoon station in Canada along with the film Ninja Scroll.

=== Macross Plus: Movie Edition ===
After completion, the series was re-edited for theatrical release, with a shortened 115 minute runtime. This version, entitled Macross Plus: Movie Edition, features multiple new and alternate scenes, while removing and shortening many other scenes from the original OVA series.

Macross Plus Movie Edition had a limited theatrical release at the Barbican Centre in the UK on September 14, 2019, and in the U.S. through Fathom Events on December 14, 2021.

== Home video ==
Macross Plus was first released in Japan on VHS and Laserdisc formats by Bandai Visual, and on DVD, the very latter on August 25, 2001 (Ep.1) & February 25, 2002 (Ep.4) respectively. Said discs include English dialogue. Manga Entertainment released the series in VHS (dubbed and subtitled versions) and Laserdisc formats in Europe and as their first title in the North American market. The English-dubbed series was also released in MovieCD format for Windows 3.1/Windows 95-based PCs. In 1999, Manga Entertainment released Macross Plus on DVD format, with two episodes per disc. Sales of disc 2 of the series were affected by a subtitle timing error, which was corrected on subsequent reprints.

A subtitle-only version of Macross Plus: Movie Edition was released on VHS in the U.S. through Manga Entertainment, with a DVD release in 2000. The DVD version is a direct transfer from the VHS release, causing the subtitles to be part of the footage itself, so they can't be turned off. There is no English dub for the movie version.

On August 24, 2007, an HD Remastered DVD box set containing both the entire OVA series and the Movie Edition was released in Japan. Unlike the episodic releases however, which included the English dub alongside the Japanese track, the dub was omitted, and a PCM mix replaced both (Dolby Digital) stereo options heard before. On June 21, 2013, a Blu-ray box, again featuring episodes 1-4 & Movie released. This time however, the English dub was reinstated, and episodes 1-4 include both English & Japanese audio, with episode 4 using the newer Bandai mix, while retaining Manga's original for episodes 1-3. The Movie Edition is Japan-exclusive but offers English subtitles, plus a new DTS-HD Master Audio 5.1 track to go alongside its PCM option. A stand-alone Blu-ray of the theatrical cut was made available on January 29, 2016.

== Merchandise ==
=== Books ===
During the release of the series, Shogakukan published the companion visual book This Is Animation Special: Macross Plus, which covered the first two episodes. A follow-up book was released, covering the production of the Movie Edition.

=== Toys ===
Macross Plus toys were not available until 2000, when Yamato Toys released a 1/72 scale diecast replica of the YF-19. Since then, aside from Yamato, replicas and figures of the series' variable fighters have been manufactured by Doyusha and Kaiyodo (under the Revoltech line).

None of these toys are widely available in the U.S. due to ongoing legal disputes between Big West and Tatsunoko Production/Harmony Gold USA over the Macross copyright.

=== Model kits ===
Hasegawa Hobby Kits released non-transforming model kits of the YF-19 and YF-21 in fighter modes between 2001 and 2002. The molds for both planes were re-used for the VF-19A (from Macross VF-X2) and VF-22S (from Macross 7), respectively.

In 2009, Hasegawa released a new-tool 1:48 scale kit of the YF-19, in conjunction with their 1:48 VF-1 Valkyrie model kit.

Resin and garage kits of the Macross Plus variable fighters have been manufactured by several different companies in Japan. The most well-known of these kits is the 1/100 Perfect Variable YF-19 by Studio HalfEye, which became the basis for Yamato Toys' 1/72 diecast toy.

Bandai released High Grade 1/100 plastic model kits of the VF-19 and VF-21 in 2023 and 2024 respectively, which were able to transform via switching parts.

=== Manga adaptation ===
A new manga adaptation of the anime is being serialized by comic publisher Kadokawa Comics A with the name Macross Plus: TAC Name. The story of the comic is a retelling of the events from the anime as well as a more detailed description of the background and past history of the characters. The artist of the manga is Naoki Moriya and is available since February 10, 2012.

=== Video games ===
In 1997, Banpresto released a vertically scrolling shooter arcade game adaptation of Macross Plus.

A video game adaptation of the OVA series titled Macross Plus: Game Edition (マクロスプラス -Game Edition-, Makurosu Purasu Game Edition) was released by Shoeisha Co. Ltd. for the PlayStation in 2000 in Japan only. The game features some members of the original cast and staff, and includes parts of the original soundtrack, as well as some cutscenes in the form of excerpts from the Movie Edition of Macross Plus. It includes the variable fighters and mecha used in the OVA, as well as select units from the original Macross series. The game also introduces the Neo Glaug (a transformable version of the Zentradi battle pod) as an in-game exclusive. Unlike other Macross games, transformation of variable fighters is not possible during gameplay; each level has the player's unit fixed in one mode only. Aside from the single-player story mode, two players can battle each other in vs. mode.

== Reception ==
Macross Plus has received widespread critical acclaim, and has been frequently regarded as one of the greatest mecha anime series of all time.

Raphael See of THEM Anime Reviews gave Macross Plus a perfect 5-star review, praising the story, characters, CGI artwork, animation, soundtrack, and flight scenes, ultimately concluding that "if you're only going to watch one mecha anime, Macross Plus is the way to go. A masterpiece." Coop Bicknell of Anime News Network gave Macross Plus an A+ rating, stating that the series has "continued to age like fine wine over the past thirty years." Andrew Archer of The Tokyo 5 named Macross Plus the best entry in the entire Macross franchise, praising Shinichirō Watanabe's work as co-director, stating that "it's classic Watanabe; brilliant pacing, long lingering glances at beautiful scenery and action that cuts back and forth exactly in the places it needs to cut, at exactly the right time." Comic Book Resources listed Macross Plus as the 45th greatest mecha anime of all time, stating that "though Macross Plus doesn't have the popularity it once did, these days, it couldn't be more relevant." GameRant listed Macross Plus as the sixth most influential mecha anime series of the 1990s, concluding that "with some stunning set piece dog fights and a deep, involving story, Macross Plus set the tone for all future entries in the series."

Writing for The Encyclopedia of Science Fiction, Piotr Konieczny described Macross Plus as one of the most critically admired installments of the Macross franchise and one of the most accomplished mecha works of the 1990s, praising its combination of ambitious animation and visual effects, character-driven drama, thematic seriousness and Yoko Kanno's soundtrack. The reviewer highlighted the OVA's treatment of artificial intelligence, celebrity and emotionally manipulative media through the virtual idol Sharon Apple, whose relationship with her audience anticipates later concerns surrounding synthetic performers and parasocial interactions. The encyclopedia entry also identified identity, memory and suppressed guilt as important themes, and noted the work's exploration of human–machine relations through competing human pilots, neural interfaces and autonomous military aircraft. It further credited Macross Plus with helping popularize mature OVA storytelling and influencing Western perceptions of anime as a medium extending beyond children's entertainment.
