= Lia Sargent =

American voice actress

- Born: February 20, 1957 (age 69); Los Angeles, California
- Other names: Mary Briscoe, Lia Sargeant
- Occupation: Voice Actor/Director/Acting Coach
- Years active: 1983–present
- Notable credit(s): Xenosaga (Episode I & Episode III) as Shion Uzuki; The Big O as R. Dorothy Wayneright; Street Fighter as Chun-Li; Trigun as Milly Thompson
- Family: Joseph Sargent (father); Mary Carver (mother)

Lia Sargent is an American voice actress. She is known for extensive anime and video game voice work and has also done ADR directing and script writing for Animaze.. iNC. She is the daughter of movie and TV director Joseph Sargent and actress Mary Carver.

== Notable voice roles ==
=== Anime ===
- 3×3 Eyes - Meixing Long (Streamline dub)
- Ah! My Goddess: The Movie - Morgan le Fay
- Ai Yori Aoshi - Miyabi Kagurazaki, Kumi Hojo
- Battle Athletes OVA - Jessie Gurtland
- Battle Athletes Victory - Akari Kanzaki
- The Big O - R. Dorothy Wayneright
- Black Magic M-66 - Sybel
- Bobobo-bo Bo-bobo - Suzu
- Cardcaptor Sakura Movie 2: The Sealed Card - The Nothing Card
- Catnapped! - Chuchu
- Cosmo Warrior Zero - Marina Oki
- Cowboy Bebop - Judy
- Cowboy Bebop: The Movie - Judy
- Cyborg 009 - Artemis, Sandra (Ep. 29), Vena
- El-Hazard - Nanami Jinnai
- éX-Driver - Lisa Sakakino
- Galerians: Rion - Rita
- Gate Keepers - Yukino Hojo
- Gate Keepers 21 - Satoka Tachikawa, Yukino Hojo
- Ghost in the Shell: S.A.C. 2nd GIG - Tachikoma
- Hand Maid May - Cyberdoll May
- Kikaider the Animation - Mitsuko Komyoji
- Mahoromatic: Automatic Maiden - Yoshimi Tanaka, Sera
- Megazone 23 (Streamline dub) - Mai Yumekanou
- Mobile Suit Gundam III: Encounters in Space - Lalah Sune
- Mobile Suit Gundam 0083: Stardust Memory - Latora
- Nightwalker - Mikako, Manami's Mother
- Ninja Cadets - Matsuri
- Planetes - Claire Rondo
- Rurouni Kenshin - Magudaria Sayo
- Saber Marionette J Again - Marine
- Sakura Wars: The Movie - Kaede Fujieda
- Scrapped Princess - Eirote Borchard
- Serial Experiments Lain - Chisa Yomoda
- Street Fighter II: The Animated Movie - Chun-Li (as Mary Briscoe)
- Street Fighter II V (Animaze Dub) - Chun-Li
- Street Fighter Alpha: The Animation - Chun-Li
- Trigun - Milly Thompson
- Vandread: The Second Stage - Misty Cornwell
- Wolf's Rain - Neige, Cher's Assistant
- X (TV series) - Arashi Kishu
- Yu Yu Hakusho: The Movie - Botan (Animaze Dub)
- Zenki - Hiroshi, additional voices.

=== Non-anime ===
- Dead Space: Downfall - Jen Barrow
- The Nutcracker and the Mouseking - Clara
- Shrek - Additional Voices
- Zentrix - Silver General

=== Games ===
- Brave Fencer Musashi - Bubbles
- Gundam Side Story 0079: Rise From the Ashes - Jacqueline
- .hack series - Aura, Natsume
- Xenosaga Episode I: Der Wille Zur Macht - Shion Uzuki
- .hack//G.U. Vol. 2//Reminisce - Sophora
- Phase Paradox - Additional voices
- Shadow Hearts: Covenant - Saki Inugami
- Star Ocean: Till the End of Time - Clair Lasbard
- The Bard's Tale - Additional voices
- Xenosaga Episode III: Also Sprach Zarathustra - Shion Uzuki

=== Live action ===
- What the Bleep Do We Know!? - Various Character Voices

== Production credits ==
=== Voice direction ===
- Battle Athletes Victory
- The Big O (season 2)
- .hack series
- Gate Keepers
- Hand Maid May
- Perfect Blue
- Resident Evil Outbreak File #2
- Serial Experiments Lain
- Trigun

=== Script adaptation ===
- The Big O
- Mobile Suit Gundam 0080: War in the Pocket
- Mobile Suit Gundam 0083: Stardust Memory
- Outlaw Star
- Perfect Blue
- Wolf's Rain

=== Casting director ===
- Johnson War Country
