= Mitsuru Miyamoto =

Japanese actor, voice actor and narrator (born 1958)

- 宮本 充
- Born: September 8, 1958 (age 67); Tokyo, Japan
- Occupations: Actor; voice actor; narrator
- Years active: 1985–present
- Agent: Theatre Company Subaru
- Height: 176 cm (5 ft 9 in)

Mitsuru Miyamoto (宮本 充, Miyamoto Mitsuru; born September 8, 1958) is a Japanese actor, voice actor and narrator, affiliated with Theatre Company Subaru. He is best known for his roles as Keiichi Nakagawa in Kochira Katsushika-ku Kameari Kōen-mae Hashutsujo, Roger Smith in The Big O, Ougai Mori in Bungo Stray Dogs, Gaku Yashiro in Erased, Steven A. Starphase in Blood Blockade Battlefront and Maiza Avaro in Baccano!. He is the Japanese voice of adult Simba in The Lion King and related media. In the live-action field, Miyamoto is the dub-over artist of Ethan Hawke, Adrien Brody, Matthew Modine, Gil Bellows and Guy Pearce, and the first dub-over artist of Keanu Reeves and Brad Pitt.

== Filmography ==
=== Anime series ===
1990s

- YuYu Hakusho (1993) (Akarenja)
- H2 (1995) (Hideo Tachibana)
- Baby and Me (1996) (Harumi Enoki)
- Kochira Katsushika-ku Kameari Kōen-mae Hashutsujo (1996) (Keiichi Nakagawa)
- Kinda'ichi Case Files (1997) (Takuya Ogi)
- Fancy Lala (1998) (Katsunoshin Asaka-sensei)
- Super Doll★Licca-chan (1998) (Louie Akiyama)
- The Big O (1999) (Roger Smith)

2000s

- Fruits Basket (2001) (Ayame Sohma) (snake zodiac)
- Piano: The Melody of a Young Girl's Heart (2002) (Shirakawa)
- RahXephon (2002) (Itsuki Kisaragi)
- Inuyasha (2002) (Lord Kuranosuke Takeda)
- Full Metal Panic? Fumoffu (2003) (Mr. Mizuhoshi)
- Gunslinger Girl (2003) (Jean)
- Wolf's Rain (2003) (Hubb Lebowski)
- Naruto (2005) (Akahoshi)
- Tsubasa: Reservoir Chronicle (2005) (Kyle Rondart)
- Air Gear (2006) (Sora Takeuchi)
- Baccano (2007) (Maiza Avaro)
- Saiyuki Reload: Burial (2007) (Koumyou Sanzo)
- Blue Dragon (2007) (Conrad)
- Claymore (2007) (Pablo Mountain Male Awakened Being)
- Wangan Midnight (2008) (Eiji Kamiya)
- Corpse Princess (2008–2009) (Akasha Shishidou)

2010s

- Katanagatari (2010) (Ginkaku Uneri)
- Metal Fight Beyblade: Baku (2010) (Dr. Ziggurat)
- Fractale (2011) (Barrot)
- Tiger & Bunny (2011) (Dr. Rotwang)
- Dragon Crisis! (2012) (George Evans)
- Space Battleship Yamato 2199 (2013) (Mamoru Kodai)
- Wake Up, Girls! (2014) (Tōru Shiraki)
- Yu-Gi-Oh! Zexal II (2014) (Don Thousand - second form)
- Mushi-Shi -Next Passage- (2014) (Masaki (Ep. 6))
- Tokyo ESP (2014) (Kiriya Konparu)
- Nanatsu no Taizai (2014) (Dale)
- Akatsuki no Yona (2014) (Ao)
- Blood Blockade Battlefront (2015) (Steven A. Starphase)
- Erased (2016) (Gaku Yashiro)
- Drifters (2016) (Murasaki)
- Joker Game (2016) (Aaron Price)
- Bungo Stray Dogs (2016) (Ōgai Mori)
- Fate/Apocrypha (2017) (Caster of Black/Avicebron)
- After the Rain (2018) (Chihiro Kujo)
- Beyblade Burst Super Z (2018) (Taiga Akaba)
- A Certain Magical Index III (2019) (Aiwass)

2020s

- The Misfit of Demon King Academy (2020) (Diego Kanon Ijaysica)
- The Millionaire Detective Balance: Unlimited (2020) (Shigemaru Kambe)
- Bungo Stray Dogs! Wan (2021) (Ōgai Mori)
- The Idaten Deities Know Only Peace (2021) (Takeshita)
- Fanfare of Adolescence (2022) (Futoshi Kashino)
- Classroom of the Elite 2nd Season (2022) (Chairman Sakayanagi)
- Takt Op Destiny (2022) (Bartender)
- To Your Eternity 2nd Season (2022) (Cylira)
- Soaring Sky! Pretty Cure (2023) (Skearhead)
- Kaiju No. 8 (2024) (Mizoguchi)
- Blue Miburo (2024) (Jutarō Kimura)
- Magic Maker: How to Make Magic in Another World (2025) (Gawain)
- The Mononoke Lecture Logs of Chuzenji-sensei (2025) (Soichiro)
- The Oblivious Saint Can't Contain Her Power (2026) (Raymond)

=== Films ===
- Ghost in the Shell (1995) (Mizuho Daida)
- One Piece The Movie: Dead End Adventure (2003) (Shuraiya Bascúd)
- Welcome to the Space Show (2010) (Robby)
- Saint Seiya: Legend of Sanctuary (2014) (Mu)
- Fireworks (Yusuke's father) (2017)
- Seven Days War (2019) (Kaori Yamazaki's father)

=== Video games ===
- Everybody's Golf 2 (xxxx) (Hawk)
- Double Switch (Eddie) (Japanese dub)
- Heavy Rain (2010) (Ethan Mars)
- Resident Evil: Revelations (2012) (Parker Luciani)
- GioGio's Bizarre Adventure (2002) (Diavolo and Vinegar Doppio)
- Super Robot Wars series (xxxx) (Roger Smith)
- Tales of Zestiria (xxxx) (Rosh)
- Civilization VI (xxxx) (Philip II)
- Kingdom Hearts II (2005) (Simba)
- Fate/Grand Order (2018) (Avicebron)
- Marvel's Spider-Man (2018) (Mr. Negative/Martin Li)
- Disney: Twisted-Wonderland (2020) (Dire Crowley)
- Tactics Ogre: Reborn (2022) (Nybeth Obdilord)
- Final Fantasy XVI (2023) (Ultima)
- Death Stranding 2: On The Beach (2025) (Tarman)

=== Drama CDs ===
- Soul Eater (xxxx) (Franken Stein)

=== Tokusatsu ===
- Kaitou Sentai Lupinranger VS Keisatsu Sentai Patranger (2018) (Dogranio Yaboon (eps. 1 - 4, 6 - 7, 10 - 11, 13 - 15, 18, 20 - 23, 25 - 26, 28 - 30, 32, 34 - 36, 38, 40 - 43, 46 - 51))
- Kaitou Sentai Lupinranger VS Keisatsu Sentai Patranger en Film (2018) (Dogranio Yaboon)

=== Dubbing ===
==== Live-action ====
- Adrien Brody
  - Love the Hard Way (Jack)
  - The Pianist (Wladyslaw Szpilman)
  - The Village (Noah Percy)
  - The Jacket (Jack Starks)
  - King Kong (Jack Driscoll)
  - Cadillac Records (Leonard Chess)
  - The Experiment (Travis)
  - Third Person (Scott)
  - Backtrack (Peter Bower)
  - Dragon Blade (Tiberius)
  - Manhattan Night (Porter Wren)
  - Bullet Head (Stacy)
  - Chapelwaite (Captain Charles Boone)
  - Blonde (Arthur Miller)
- Ethan Hawke
  - Alive (Nando Parrado)
  - Before Sunrise (Jesse Wallace)
  - Gattaca (Vincent Anton Freeman)
  - Snow Falling on Cedars (Ishmael Chambers)
  - Hamlet (Hamlet)
  - Before Sunset (Jesse Wallace)
  - Taking Lives (2008 TV Asahi edition) (James Costa)
  - Assault on Precinct 13 (2008 TV Asahi edition) (Sergeant Jake Roenick)
  - Daybreakers (Edward Dalton)
  - Before Midnight (Jesse)
  - Getaway (Brent Magna)
  - Boyhood (Mason Evans Sr.)
  - The Magnificent Seven (Goodnight Robicheaux)
- Keanu Reeves
  - My Own Private Idaho (Scott Favor)
  - Point Break (1993 NTV edition) (FBI Agent Johnny Utah)
  - Bram Stoker's Dracula (1995 TV Asahi edition) (Jonathan Harker)
  - Speed (1998 TV Asahi edition) (Officer Jack Traven)
  - Johnny Mnemonic (Johnny Mnemonic)
  - Feeling Minnesota (Jjaks Clayton)
  - Chain Reaction (Eddie Kasalivich)
  - The Matrix (Broadcasting inflight edition) (Thomas Anderson/Neo)
- David Arquette
  - Scream (1996) (Dewey Riley)
  - Scream 2 (Dewey Riley)
  - Scream 3 (Dewey Riley)
  - Never Die Alone (Paul)
  - The Adventures of Sharkboy and Lavagirl in 3-D (Max's Father)
  - Scream 4 (Dewey Riley)
  - Scream (2022) (Dewey Riley)
- Brad Pitt
  - Interview with the Vampire (1998 Fuji TV edition) (Louis de Pointe du Lac)
  - Legends of the Fall (Tristan Ludlow)
  - 12 Monkeys (Jeffrey Goines)
  - The Devil's Own (Rory Devaney/Francis "Frankie" McGuire)
  - The Dark Side of the Sun (Rick)
  - Meet Joe Black (Joe Black/Man in the Coffee Shop)
- Matthew Modine
  - Pacific Heights (1997 Fuji TV edition) (Drake Goodman)
  - Cutthroat Island (1998 Fuji TV edition) (William Shaw)
  - Any Given Sunday (2002 NTV edition) (Dr. Oliver "Ollie" Powers)
  - Transporter 2 (Jefferson Billings)
  - Backtrace (MacDonald)
  - Sicario: Day of the Soldado (James Riley)
- Takeshi Kaneshiro
  - Executioners (Chong Hon / Coda)
  - Downtown Torpedoes (Jackal)
  - Hero (Ma Wing-jing)
  - Tempting Heart (Ho-jun)
  - Lavender (Angel)
  - Confession of Pain (Yau Kin-bong)
- Guy Pearce
  - L.A. Confidential (Det. Lt. Edmund "Ed" Exley)
  - The King's Speech (King Edward VIII)
  - Lawless (Charlie Rakes)
  - Mary Queen of Scots (William Cecil)
  - Bloodshot (Dr. Emil Harting)
  - Without Remorse (Thomas Clay)
- Luke Wilson
  - Blue Streak (Carlson)
  - Around the World in 80 Days (2008 TV Tokyo edition) (Orville Wright)
  - Vacancy (David Fox)
  - Henry Poole Is Here (Henry Poole)
  - All We Had (Lee)
- Chris O'Donnell
  - The Three Musketeers (D'Artagnan)
  - Batman Forever (Dick Grayson/Robin)
  - Batman & Robin (Dick Grayson/Robin)
  - Kinsey (Wardell Pomeroy)
- Dermot Mulroney
  - The Heart of Justice (Elliot Burgess)
  - Point of No Return (1997 NTV edition) (J.P.)
  - Bad Girls (1997 TV Asahi edition) (Josh McCoy)
  - My Best Friend's Wedding (Michael O'Neal)
- Matt Damon
  - Courage Under Fire (2004 TV Asahi edition) (Specialist Ilario)
  - Good Will Hunting (Will Hunting)
  - Rounders (Mike McDermott)
  - The Good Shepherd (Edward Wilson)
- Edward Norton
  - Everyone Says I Love You (Holden Spence)
  - Birdman (Mike Shiner)
  - Collateral Beauty (Collateral Beauty)
  - Glass Onion: A Knives Out Mystery (Miles Bron)
- 12 Years a Slave (Ford (Benedict Cumberbatch))
- Alien: Covenant (David and Walter (Michael Fassbender))
- Along Came Polly (Claude (Hank Azaria))
- Amélie (Nino Quincampoix (Mathieu Kassovitz))
- Antitrust (Milo Hoffman (Ryan Phillippe))
- Apollo 13 (John Aaron (Loren Dean))
- August: Osage County (Bill Fordham (Ewan McGregor))
- Bandidas (Quentin Cooke (Steve Zahn))
- Battlestar Galactica (Dr. Gaius Baltar (James Callis))
- Behind Enemy Lines (Lieutenant Chris Burnett (Owen Wilson))
- The Big Lebowski (VHS/DVD edition) (Brandt (Philip Seymour Hoffman))
- Birthday Girl (John Buckingham (Ben Chaplin))
- Blood & Treasure (Simon Hardwick (James Callis))
- Blood In Blood Out (Miklo (Damian Chapa))
- The Boondock Saints (Murphy MacManus (Norman Reedus))
- The Boondock Saints II: All Saints Day (Murphy MacManus (Norman Reedus))
- The Bourne Identity (Danny Zorn (Gabriel Mann))
- Brain Games (Mark Cuban)
- Broken City (Jack Valliant (Barry Pepper))
- Can't Hardly Wait (Preston Meyers (Ethan Embry))
- Choke (Lord High Charlie (Clark Gregg))
- Christine (2019 Blu-Ray edition) (Detective Rudolph "Rudy" Junkins (Harry Dean Stanton))
- Clueless (Josh Lucas (Paul Rudd))
- The Crow (1997 TV Tokyo edition) (Eric Draven/The Crow (Brandon Lee))
- Dead Poets Society (1994 Fuji TV edition) (Neil Perry (Robert Sean Leonard))
- Dear John (Tim Wheddon (Henry Thomas))
- Desperate Measures (Frank Conner (Andy García))
- Down with Love (Catcher Block (Ewan McGregor))
- ER (George Henry (Chad Lowe))
- Final Destination 2 (2006 TV Tokyo edition) (Thomas Burke (Michael Landes))
- First Blood (1995 TV Asahi edition) (Deputy Mitch Rogers (David Caruso))
- The Flash (Dr. Harrison Wells (Tom Cavanagh))
- Gentlemen Broncos (Dusty (Mike White))
- Gladiator (2003 TV Asahi edition) (Commodus (Joaquin Phoenix))
- Golden Job (Lion (Ekin Cheng))
- The Great Gatsby (Nick Carraway (Sam Waterston))
- A Hidden Life (Franz Jägerstätter (August Diehl))
- Hocus Pocus (Max (Omri Katz))
- Hollywood Homicide (Detective K. C. Calden (Josh Hartnett))
- Home Alone (1998 TV Asahi edition) (Marv (Daniel Stern))
- Hope Floats (Justin Matisse (Harry Connick Jr.))
- The Hudsucker Proxy (Norville Barnes (Tim Robbins))
- The Indian in the Cupboard (Little Bear (Litefoot))
- Inspector Gadget (Sanford Scolex / Dr. Claw (Rupert Everett))
- Kalifornia (Brian Kessler (David Duchovny))
- Lara Croft: Tomb Raider (2005 TV Asahi edition) (Bryce (Noah Taylor))
- Lara Croft: Tomb Raider – The Cradle of Life (2006 TV Asahi edition) (Bryce (Noah Taylor))
- The Legend of Zu (King Sky (Ekin Cheng))
- Lincoln (President Abraham Lincoln (Daniel Day-Lewis))
- The Lord of the Rings trilogy (Faramir (David Wenham))
- The Lord of the Rings: The Rings of Power (Celebrimbor (Charles Edwards))
- Love in the Time of Cholera (Florentino Ariza (Javier Bardem))
- Mannequin (Jonathan Switcher (Andrew McCarthy))
- Martial Arts of Shaolin (Chao Wei)
- Moulin Rouge! (Christian (Ewan McGregor))
- Much Ado About Nothing (Count Claudio (Robert Sean Leonard))
- Music and Lyrics (Alex Fletcher (Hugh Grant))
- Nemesis (Billy (Thomas Jane))
- Octopus (Roy Turner (Jay Harrington))
- The Order (Alex Bernier (Heath Ledger))
- Ouija: Origin of Evil (Father Tom Hogan (Henry Thomas))
- Pay It Forward (Ricky McKinney (Jon Bon Jovi))
- Platoon (1998 DVD edition) (Chris Taylor (Charlie Sheen))
- Prometheus (David (Michael Fassbender))
- Pulp Fiction (Lance (Eric Stoltz))
- Quiz (Charles Ingram (Matthew Macfadyen))
- Quiz Show (Charles Van Doren (Ralph Fiennes))
- The Reader (Michael Berg (Ralph Fiennes))
- Resident Evil (Matt Addison (Eric Mabius))
- Scandal (Stephen Finch (Henry Ian Cusick))
- Scary Movie (Doofy Gilmore (Dave Sheridan))
- Sense and Sensibility (Edward Ferrars (Hugh Grant))
- Single White Female (Sam Rawson (Steven Weber))
- Sleeping with the Enemy (Fleishman (Kyle Secor))
- Sneakers (Carl Arbogast (River Phoenix))
- Someone like You (Eddie Alden (Hugh Jackman))
- Speed 2: Cruise Control (Merced (Brian McCardie))
- Switchback (Dr. Lane Dixon (Jared Leto))
- The Terminator (1998 DVD edition) (Kyle Reese (Michael Biehn))
- The Texas Chainsaw Massacre 2 (L. G. Peters (Lou Perryman))
- This Boy's Life (Arthur Gayle (Jonah Blechman))
- Transformers: Dark of the Moon (President Kennedy)
- U.S. Marshals (2004 TV Tokyo edition) (John Royce (Robert Downey Jr.))
- The Usual Suspects (Fred Fenster (Benicio del Toro))
- Waitress (Dr. Jim Pomatter (Nathan Fillion))
- What's Eating Gilbert Grape (Gilbert Grape (Johnny Depp))
- Wyatt Earp (Morgan Earp (Linden Ashby))

==== Animation ====
- The Animatrix (Tom)
- The Boss Baby: Back in Business (Bootsy Calico)
- A Bug's Life (Flik)
- Cars (Flik)
- The Lion Guard (Simba)
- The Lion King (adult Simba)
- Toy Story 2 (Flik)
