= List of The Big O episodes =

Cover art for The Big O Complete Collection DVD release by Bandai Entertainment

The Big O (THE ビッグオー, Tha Biggu Ō) is a mecha-anime television series directed by Kazuyoshi Katayama and animated by the Japanese animation studio Sunrise. The series follows Roger Smith, Paradigm City's top Negotiator.

The first season of the series premiered on October 13, 1999, on Wowow with the episode "Roger the Negotiator" and concluded with "R.D." on January 19, 2000. Starting on April 2, 2001, The Big O aired two times in its edited form on the Cartoon Network: once during the afternoon Toonami programming block at 5:30 PM, and once at 12:30 AM during Toonami: Midnight Run; the 12:30 AM showing was the premiere and the more publicized 5:30 PM showing a rerun. In anticipation of the premiere of The Big O: Season Two, the first thirteen episodes were re-aired, completely uncut, on the Adult Swim block.

Originally a 26-episode series, it was reduced to 13 episodes due to low ratings in Japan. However, positive international reception resulted in a second season co-produced by Cartoon Network, Sunrise, and Bandai Visual. The Big O: Season Two premiered on 2 January 2003 on Sun Television with the episode "Roger the Wanderer" and concluded with "The Show Must Go On" on March 27, 2003. The American premiere took place on Adult Swim on August 3, 2003. On October 26, the scheduled premiere of the final episode, "The Show Must Go On", was instead accidentally replaced by a rerun of episode 20, "Stripes". This resulted in the Adult Swim message boards being flooded with complaints by viewers. After an apology from Kim Manning, programming director for Adult Swim, the final episode was properly aired on November 2.

The first opening theme is the Queen-inspired "BIG-O!" Composed, arranged and performed by Rui Nagai. The second opening theme is "Respect," composed by Toshihiko Sahashi. The track is an homage to the music of UFO, composed by Barry Gray. In 2007, Rui Nagai composed "Big-O! Show Must Go On," a 1960s hard rock piece, for Animax's reruns of the show. This opening was subsequently used in the 2007 North American DVD re-release of the series. The closing theme is "And Forever," written by Chie and composed by Ken Shima. The duet is performed by Robbie Danzie and Naoki Takao.

== Episode list ==
=== Season 1 (1999–2000) ===
No.	Title	Directed by	Written by	Original air date	English air date
1	"Roger The Negotiator"	Ikurō Satō	Chiaki Konaka	October 13, 1999	April 2, 2001
Roger Smith, top negotiator of Paradigm City, is hired to oversee the retrieval of R. Dorothy Wayneright, the kidnapped daughter of the wealthy scientist Miguel Soldano. The thugs try to escape with the briefcase of ransom money until Roger finds out that Dorothy is really an android, a replacement of her deceased human counterpart. After destroying the briefcase and returning home, Roger is visited by Dorothy, who requests that Roger protect her. Roger unwillingly takes Dorothy to her father's factory, only to see it in ruins as her father passes away in front of them. The thugs from before begin to shoot missiles at Roger and Dorothy, yet the two manage to defeat them with the use of a diversion. A giant Megadeus, known as Dorothy-1, roaming the city is seen attacking the bureau building, overpowering the military police. Roger summons his Megadeus, the Big O, from underground and prevents Dorothy-1 from stealing printing plates from the bureau building.
2	"Dorothy Dorothy"	Ikurō Satō	Chiaki Konaka	October 20, 1999	April 3, 2001
Dorothy, distraught from having seen Dorothy-1 destroyed, suddenly disappears after the Big O returns to its underground base. Rogers ponders what Dorothy's connection with the giant Megadeus is. At night, Dorothy is seen with Timothy Wayneright I, introduced as her grandfather at a clubhouse. Roger quickly deduces that Wayneright is Dorothy's true "father," who built her using his memories. Jason Beck, appearing a second time, shoots Wayneright after taking him hostage and stuns Dorothy after she tries to escape. Dorothy-1, revealed to be piloted by Beck, runs amok in the city once more. However, when Roger tries to finish off Beck, he sees Dorothy attached to Dorothy-1, being used as a power regulator circuit. Roger, hesitant to fight back, climbs out of the Big O and pulls Dorothy out, making Dorothy-1 useless and leading Beck to his arrest. Following the aftermath of Wayneright's death, Dorothy resides with Roger as his maid.
3	"Electric City"	Tōru Kitahata	Chiaki Konaka	October 27, 1999	April 4, 2001
There have been power outages occurring recently within the city. Casey Jenkins, a representative of the city's power management, hires Roger to go to the Electric City and negotiate with the locals the reactivation of the hydroelectric power plant. The reason for their hindrance is because of their belief that a god who lives in the lake will arise and harm the city. While sneaking out at night, Roger finds himself in the cabin of an old man who despises those who work for the city, though the old man grows to appreciate his kind services. Roger later finds a secret basement under the cabin, finding out that the old man is a retired researcher. The turbines of the dam mysteriously turn on, and Rogers finds out that Casey, exposing herself as Angel, is responsible for this, after going to the power plant himself. As the underground pipes overflow, a creature, known as the Eel, peers from the lake, absorbing the electricity from the dam. Angel tries to escape by car, but the creature causes it to stall. Roger, summoning the Big O, goes into battle against the Eel, but it does not go well for him. The old man manages to shut down the dam, and Roger is able to fire a blast straight through the Eel. Roger later destroys the power plant to prevent future reactivation, while keeping in mind that the old man was the one who had created the Eel.
4	"Underground Terror"	Tetsuya Watanabe	Chiaki Konaka	November 3, 1999	April 5, 2001
A journalist named Michael Seebach has gone missing for three months, and has taken his latest manuscript with him. Angel, now working as a secretary at the city's press as Patricia Lovejoy, hires Roger to retrieve the manuscript and give Seebach his severance pay. In his search for Seebach, Roger discovers that the reporter has been leading a double life as the maniacal Schwarzwald. As Roger climbs deep underground past the abandoned subway, he undergoes trauma when he sees ghosts passing by. Dorothy, who had followed him, manages to return Roger's mental state back to normal, and brings him to where an old Megadeus known as the Archetype, has been dumped. Schwarzwald suddenly appears and prepares to burn up the area, when Dorothy somehow activates the Archetype, throwing Schwarzwald off guard. Dorothy, feeling fear for the first time, is chased by the Archetype, until Roger calls forth the Big O and destroys it. Schwarzwald is presumed dead in the aftermath.
5	"Bring Back My Ghost"	Hideki Okamoto	Keiichi Hasegawa	November 10, 1999	April 6, 2001
Roger, having traveled all the way to East Town, is hired by a wealthy and blind old woman to help find her son Bonny Fraser for her birthday the next day. However, Bonny died in a protest one year ago. The informant Big Ear tells Roger that a ghost appears by the river when the fog is thick enough, and that three of the top brass of the military police have already died after seeing it. As a colonel named Anthony Gauss heads back to the military police headquarters, he realizes that Bonny is still alive, and falls into the river after seeing the ghostly figure. After the military police fail to attack the figure, Roger arrives in the Big O ready to fight, but his attacks pass right through. He discovers that Bonny uses a ghostly Megadeus, known as Osrail, to show a projected image of the figure, thus explaining its transparency. He destroys Osrail, and Bonny later explains that after he fell into the river the day of the protest, his life was saved by Osrail, who was submerged in the water. Bonny goes to see his mother the night of her birthday, making her cry tears of joy. His mother then passes away, and Bonny turns himself in.
6	"A Legacy of Amadeus"	Ikurō Satō	Masanao Akahoshi	November 17, 1999	April 9, 2001
Sick and tired of waking up to the banging of piano keys, Roger brings Dorothy to a piano bar, where he takes her to meet a robotic concert pianist named R. Instro, who performs a nocturne in front of an audience. It is explained that Instro's father Amadeus had built and owned the bar, leaving the piano for him to play. Roger asks Instro to teach Dorothy how to play the nocturne, but their lesson is soon interrupted by a scientist named Gieseng, who leaves after short notice. Dan Dastun, the chief of the military police, discusses with Roger that the city firm had bankrolled the funds for an experimental photo-sonic machine, known as Constanze, that went haywire. Gieseng and Amadeus had been research partners until there was a lab accident, killing Amadeus and leaving Gieseng the only survivor. Roger and Dorothy go to visit Instro the following day, however they find a massive hole in the wall and Instro gone missing. The two soon go to Amadeus's house, only to see Instro linked inside Constanze under Gieseng's orders. Roger, trying to snap Instro out of thinking that he is a tool for this experiment, brings out Big O in an attempt to stop him. The Big O is nearly torn apart by Constanze, but Dorothy plays the nocturne, distracting Instro. Roger uses the diversion to destroy Constanze and inadvertently kills Gieseng. Instro, his hands destroyed from disconnecting from the machine, realizes that he was born to be a pianist. His hands are repaired and he resumes teaching Dorothy. Much to Roger's dismay, Dorothy plays the nocturne at her usual high speed, earning praise from Instro.
7	"The Call from The Past"	Masakazu Obara	Chiaki Konaka	November 24, 1999	April 10, 2001
Three days earlier, Roger learns from a fisherman that the price of fish has gone up because of a rumored sea titan that lurks in the water. He goes to a ship factory the next day to rent a newly built submarine ship, but Angel beats him to it the day of his departure. He chases her down and jumps into the submersible with her. Meanwhile, Norman Burg, Roger's butler, becomes exceedingly worried as to why Roger has not returned home for the past three days. While Roger and Angel view an underwater city, they are bombarded by men in scuba diving gear, said to be the servants of the sea titan. They wind up crashing inside a building, and are trapped with only a limited amount of air left. Angel explains that she wanted to find a cache of memories in order to receive payment. It seems that the servants are looking for the exact same thing, but their meddling awakens the sea titan. Roger signals the Big O, accompanied by Dorothy, and follows the sea titan. The military police attacks it, only to find out that it was a projection from the sea Megadeus, known as Dagon. Roger punches out Dagon, and destroys all the memories it carries, much to Angel's chagrin.
8	"Missing Cat"	Tetsuya Watanabe	Keiichi Hasegawa	December 1, 1999	April 11, 2001
A strange murder occurs when a dog turns into a monstrous creature and kills its owner before dying. Soon after, Dorothy discovers an abandoned kitten named Pero on the way home, however Roger has his doubts when the kitten dirties his office area. Roger notices a change in Dorothy since bringing the cat home, though she does not realize it. When Pero's owners show up, Roger tries to negotiate with them to no avail. As Roger advises Dorothy to personally return Pero back to his owners, a man operating an aircraft captures Dorothy and Pero and kills the distraught owners. Big Ear says that the man is named Eugene Grant, an alchemist that researched artificial proteins. Eugene shows Dorothy his human experiments of animal genetic manipulation, revealing that Pero used to be a human child before Eugene took him for experimentation and the owners he murdered were his parents. Meanwhile, Roger and Angel find the laboratory, and fight to get past all the obstacles in their way. Roger summons Big O when an experiment, known as the Chimera, wreaks havoc. Dorothy, apprehended by Eugene, tells Roger not to attack the Chimera because Pero is the base of the experiment. The Chimera kills Eugene when Dorothy calls out to it, but it chooses to end its life in the ruins of the laboratory.
9	"Beck Comes Back"	Ikurō Satō	Shin Yoshida	December 8, 1999	April 12, 2001
Beck breaks out of prison and has a new scheme up his sleeve. Roger is brought in to negotiate in the kidnapping of the son of a wealthy man named Wise. However, Wise is in disagreement with Roger's terms of action. Roger and Dorothy take the ransom money from Wise and go to the hideout, only to be framed by Beck, involving the military police. The two learn from Wise that his wife died when his son had been born forty years ago. Roger and Dorothy then go to the warehouse to confront Beck. However, Beck traps Dorothy with a giant magnet and manipulates her programming in order to crush Roger to death. She is able to break free, but collapses from shock. Beck operates a different Megadeus, known as the Beck Victory Deluxe, in retaliation, but Roger brings out the Big O to fight back. Beck's laser beams and other attacks are no match against the Big O's armor, and he is easily defeated. Dorothy then asks Roger a hard question; if they had lost their memories and they met, would they have fallen in love?
10	"Winter Night Phantom"	Sumio Watanabe	Keiichi Hasegawa	December 15, 1999	April 13, 2001
An unknown bomber sends a toy robot to detonate a church nearby. At the same time, Dastun is haunted by dreams of a foreign woman in a movie. He shows up for an inquiry conference meeting at Paradigm's headquarters, and the committee ignores the idea that the bomber is a foreigner. The woman in his dream seems to appear in the city streets frequently after more bombings. Dastun tells Roger that at the end of the movie, the woman is shot on a boardwalk on a snowy night, and whispers the words "vous êtes si gentil". Roger finds out that the actress named is Sybil Rowan, who starred in only one movie. The city government had arrested Sybil for assumed terrorist threats, and it is assumed that she died in prison a long time ago. A scheduled speech at an amusement park is interrupted when a giant toy Megadeus, known as the Eumenides, is sent by the bomber. Dastun finds the woman at the boardwalk seeing that she is the one behind all the bombings, while Roger is busy handling the Eumenides using the Big O. When Dastun shoots the woman, this gives Roger the chance of destroying the Eumenides, but Dastun weeps as he experiences the scene shown in his dream. It is unveiled that "vous êtes si gentil" is translated to "you're so sweet," but the woman's true identity is left unknown.
11	"Daemonseed"	Tōru Kitahata	Shin Yoshida	January 5, 2000	April 16, 2001
It is said that Heaven's Day is the date of the founding of the city, and it coincides with Dorothy's birthday. A poor saxophone player named Oliver is given an emerald egg, later known as the Daemonseed, by a strange old man. Alex Rosewater, chairman of Paradigm, shows Roger a letter that he received five days earlier, that says in seven days, the world will be reborn. There are only two days left, and Roger and Dastun scramble to find potential leads. Dorothy visits Oliver's blind girlfriend Laura, questioning her as to why she loves Oliver so much despite his lies about his lack of success from playing the saxophone for spare change. As Oliver plays in the city dome on the day before Heaven's Day, the Daemonseed hatches into a giant plant and grows large vines, covering the entire dome. Roger calls Big O and struggles to contain the creature, but nonetheless, the Daemonseed stops growing when it breaks past the dome. Alex Rosewater reveals that Heaven's Day used to celebrate the birth of God's son. Oliver and Laura reunite in the rubble of the streets. Roger exchanges gifts with Dorothy, while Oliver plays a tune in front of the crowd.
12	"Enemy is Another Big!"	Tetsuya Watanabe	Masanao Akahoshi	January 12, 2000	April 17, 2001
It is reported that Schwarzwald is still living, piloting a Megadeus of his own which is wrapped in bandages. Roger goes into combat using the Big O against Schwarzwald. The bandages covering the Megadeus are burned away during the fight, revealing its true identity as the Big Duo. Thanks to Angel, Roger finds Schwarzwald later at a bizarre masquerade party on a skyscraper building, but things go awry when the masks of the party's guests light up in flames, causing them all to jump out of the building. Schwarzwald challenges Roger to a final showdown in their respective giant robots. Even though Roger is left unarmed, he fires a laser beam to blast through the city dome, causing a mass explosion. Roger manages to hang from the top of the dome with his chain weapon, much to Schwarzwald's surprise. The Big O lands on the Big Duo, nearly tearing it to pieces. When Schwarzwald manages to jump out of the Big Duo, it begins to move on his own for a moment until it collapses, futilely reaching towards Paradigm headquarters.
13	"R・D"	Ikurō Satō	Keiichi Hasegawa	January 19, 2000	April 18, 2001
An assassin stalks the streets of the city. A series of seemingly unrelated murders has Dastun stumped as to the motive, and the only clue is the killer's calling card, which says, "cast in the name of God, ye not guilty," unnerving Roger. Big Ear hears that the victims were said not to have been born in the city. Roger goes to an abandoned library that he recognizes from a photo in the house of one of the victims. He stumbles upon Angel, who asks him the purpose for piloting the Big O, seeing as he is already familiar with all the controls, before she decides to take her leave. A book, containing a piece of paper showing the names of the victims, suddenly appears, and Roger keeps it so he can investigate further. This leads him to find Gordon Rosewater, the author of this book, at a farm. It is deduced from the book that there had been memories of the past implanted years ago into children, and four of them are the murder victims. However, the book itself is unfinished, and Gordon encourages Roger to figure out the answer for himself. As he returns to the abandoned library, he encounters R.D., an android who looks identical to Dorothy, who says her name stands for "Red Destiny." Roger is nearly killed, but the Big O suddenly rises from the ground, with Dorothy inside, and crushes R.D. into the ceiling. The military police line up at the coast, and as three foreign megadeuses approach the city, Roger and Dorothy prepare to face them.

=== Season 2 (2003) ===
No.	Title	Directed by	Written by	Original air date	English air date
14	"Roger the Wanderer"	Ikurō Satō	Chiaki Konaka	January 2, 2003	August 3, 2003
Roger Smith and R. Dorothy Wayneright, inside the Big O, go against the three foreign megadeuses, but are eventually overwhelmed. In the midst of battle, Roger takes an attack that makes him question his existence. He finds himself in Paradigm City as it was forty years earlier, living as a vagabond and unable to call Big O. He learns that his mansion used to be a bank owned by a wealthy Jason Beck, who shuns Roger for causing a disturbance. He also sees Dorothy entering a night club with a young man, much to his dismay. In a skit-like manner, Norman Burg explains that he has waited a long time for Roger to become the pilot of the Big O. Roger comes to believe he may have been portraying someone other than himself after the memories had disappeared from his mind. He comes across Angel, who addresses him as Major, referencing his former job in the military police. She asks him if he wants to run away from himself, but when he sees Dorothy, he comes to his senses and realizes his identity in the present. Continuing his fight against the three foreign Megadeuses, he ultimately defeats them all.
15	"Negotiation with the Dead"	Tōru Kitahata	Chiaki Konaka	January 9, 2003	August 10, 2003
Kelly Fitzgerald, wife of the senator Roscoe Fitzgerald, hires Roger to negotiate with the assassin targeting her husband. Rumor has it that the members of the city senate know something from before forty years ago, and someone is running amok killing innocent people who have shared memories of the past. Roger and Dorothy go to Big Ear to figure out who would construct such a murderous android. The two visit the home of the deceased Timothy Wayneright I in order to find answers. Dorothy is soon bound to a magnetic device and Roger is attacked by a stray android, until Angel comes to rescue them. It is revealed that Roscoe is the only senator that never lost any of his memories of the past. A Megadeus known as Glinda is somehow activated and overwhelms the military police. Roger summons the Big O to destroy Glinda. Meanwhile, Dorothy and Angel discover that Roscoe is actually an android himself. The assassin, named Alan Gabriel, suddenly appears and kills Roscoe, confiscating his compact disc of stored memories before making his escape.
16	"Day of the Advent"	Tetsuya Watanabe	Chiaki Konaka	January 16, 2003	August 17, 2003
A mysterious object shrouded in light crash-lands in the city. Before anyone can investigate, a team from Paradigm recovers it. Roger meets with an old hotel manager named Jim McGowen, who pins his hopes that this object is said to be an angel of salvation. Roger reunites with Angel later, and the two locate a factory hidden in a cavern, where they find the three foreign Megadeuses that were previously destroyed. They are attacked by the same men in scuba diving gear, but manage to escape. Visiting Paradigm's headquarters, Roger chases Alan Gabriel and is brought to Alex Rosewater, who shows him a fragment of the mysterious object. Alex believes that the object is part of a satellite made forty years ago, which he deduced from the disk stolen from Roscoe. Angel discovers that more objects will fall out of orbit outside the city domes, causing massive damage, but Rosewater is unconcerned. Roger calls forth the Big O and does all he can to repel the falling satellite, finally punching it head-on. A huge explosion occurs, but the area outside the domes is unharmed. Glowing snow falls from the sky, to the delight of McGowern's sick daughter, who plays in the street with Dorothy.
17	"Leviathan"	Ikurō Satō	Chiaki Konaka	January 23, 2003	August 24, 2003
Schwarzwald attempts to stir fear by showering the city with the foretelling of his latest discovery, a Megadeus known as the Leviathan. Roger is yet again forced to track him down and investigate his whereabouts. After Dorothy finishes a piano lesson under the tutelage of R. Instro, he invites her to a church where he is now an organist. Roger decides to return to the underground exposition room where the Archetype was unearthed by Schwarzwald. He follows a tunnel that leads to a hangar containing Big Duo. To Roger's shock and dismay, it is almost completely repaired from their previous battle. Roger also finds the three foreign megadeuses he destroyed earlier, and realizes they are carrying the parts for another big-type Megadeus. Alex Rosewater appears and expresses his desire to pilot it. He tells Roger that his communicator watch is useless in the hangar, and after briefly scuffling with Alan Gabriel, he decides to return to the surface. Meanwhile, the Leviathan attacks the city, using its claws to turn anything it touches to sand. Dorothy pleads the Leviathan to stop, and she refuses its demands to become a part of it. Enraged, it attempts to smash Dorothy, yet with the help of Norman, Big O emerges from below and punches the Leviathan back. Roger returns and enters Big O with Dorothy. As the metal dragon attacks, Roger manages to hold back its arms and forces one of the claws to touch the Leviathan's own body. The weapon causes the Leviathan to disintegrate. Angel later tells Roger and Dorothy that Schwarzwald's body was found in the desert before the Leviathan's appearance.
18	"The Greatest Villain"	Kenji Nakamura	Chiaki Konaka	January 30, 2003	August 31, 2003
Beck busts out of jail again, this time using a bolt of lightning to turn off the security system, comically giving him an afro. Roger goes out to negotiate with the legal counsel for an industrial corporation, however this is a front for another scheme that Beck has cooked up. Dan Dastun reports to Dorothy that Roger has been kidnapped, prompting her to take up the position of the negotiator. Beck has constructed a replica of Roger's face and body with the ability to mimic his voice. He uses it to activate the Big O and have it mindlessly roam in the city until it stops right before the edge of the coast. Dorothy heads toward the industrial corporation building in an attempt to rescue Roger. Beck tries to capture Dorothy again, but she constrains him to a giant magnet with a metal disc around his neck. Beck activates his new Megadeus, known as Beck the Great RX3, as a last resort. Roger summons the Big O and easily takes down Beck's Megadeus in one shot. Beck is arrested for a third time.
19	"Eyewitness"	Tōru Kitahata	Chiaki Konaka	February 6, 2003	September 7, 2003
A serial killer who targets androids has claimed two victims and has yet to be identified. Paradigm takes drastic measures and assigns a new inspector named R. Frederick O'Reilly, himself an android, to the case. Dastun does not approve of this, but he must form an uneasy partnership to catch the criminal. While Dorothy returns to Norman with high grade oil, she gets a glimpse of the "android crusher" after she is shot with a time bomb, but manages to release it in time by deflecting it off a large truck. Dastun and Frederick temporarily keep Dorothy in custody in order to look through her memory. Roger attempts to track down Alan Gabriel, believing him to be the killer, but he and Alex Rosewater are said to be on vacation. He runs into Angel, who says that they are more alike than he thinks. Dastun figures out that the culprit determines which androids to kill based on their ability to receive orders of high grade oil, he tracks him down to a local oil dispensary. When Frederick chooses to engage, he is shot with a time bomb, but quickly detaches his arm and flings it into the store. The resulting explosion destroys the crusher, revealing his identity as an android, and Frederick takes out its memory chip, considering his job finished. The police headquarters then come under attack by a Megadeus known as the Construction Robot, who targets Dorothy. Norman, driving her in his motorcycle, distracts the Construction Robot long enough for Roger to bring out the Big O in order to destroy it. Dastun realizes that Frederick was sent as a puppet of Paradigm; while the android realized this as well, he still carried out the job nonetheless.
20	"Stripes"	Tetsuya Watanabe	Chiaki Konaka	February 13, 2003	September 14, 2003
Roger has recurring nightmares of his memories, and the doubts concerning his role as negotiator drive him towards Gordon Rosewater, who says that Roger is bound to him under a contract which he does not remember. Later, Roger meets with Angel, and questions her about what Alex plans to do with the foreign Megadeuses. As they get into an argument about the status of their relationship, Angel recognizes a chorus from outside the dome, and a Megadeus suddenly appears inside the city. Roger calls forth the Big O to prevent this Megadeus, known as Bonaparte, from tearing up the city. Angel goes into the remains of Grand Central Station, where she meets Vera Ronstadt, leader of the Union, a group of agents sent from a foreign land. Dorothy also enters the station, but Alan Gabriel, revealed to be a Union agent as well, shoots her in the leg. Just as Roger tries to finish off Bonaparte, the Big O suddenly stalls.
21	"The Third Big"	Ikurō Satō	Chiaki Konaka	February 20, 2003	September 21, 2003
The Big O shields itself right before Bonaparte tries to drill into it. After being shown an image of Dorothy being in danger, Roger agrees to let Big O stall and defend itself while he makes his way to Grand Central in Dastun's car. Alan prepares to pierce through Dorothy, ignoring the arrival of Angel, who is unwilling to stop him. Roger arrives just in time and confronts Alan, but Dastun interrupts their fight. As Bonaparte begins to destroy the city dome under Vera's command, Alex awakens his newly modified Megadeus, known as the Big Fau, and makes short work of the robot. However, the Big Fau suddenly refuses to obey Alex's commands, and haphazardly starts destroying the dome. Roger returns and gets back into the Big O to stop him, but the Big Fau unexpectedly shuts down.
22	"Hydra"	Akira Yoshimura	Chiaki Konaka	February 27, 2003	September 28, 2003
The military police start rounding up citizens suspected of being Union sleeper agents. At a villa, Alex explains that his father founded Paradigm City in order to preserve the memories of human civilization. Elsewhere, Angel tells Dorothy that Roger must not let the memories of the city fall into the hands of Alex or Vera. Roger is outraged that Alex would form an alliance with Vera in order to further his goals. Paradigm attempts to reactivate the Big Fau, but Vera interrupts the procedure by awakening a three-headed monster known as the Hydra Eel, which shuts off the electricity from the underground water system. Roger enters the Big O to engage in battle, but the Hydra Eel, with its ability to generate vast amounts of electricity, disables Big O and nearly shocks Roger to death. The attack evokes a memory from the past, where a lone Big O pilot faces a giant Megadeus also with the ability to use electricity as a weapon. The pilot presses a button on the floor, and Roger mirrors the action, revealing an additional control panel for Big O's force-field system. Big O transforms, and generates an impenetrable sphere of energy around itself that deflects the Hydra's attack, which is suddenly intercepted by the emergence of a lightning rod owned by Paradigm. Roger causes the force field to greatly expand outward. As the blazing sphere of energy obliterates the Hydra Eel, the energy from its last attack, collected by the lightning rod, allows the Big Fau to be reactivated.
23	"Twisted Memories"	Tōru Kitahata	Chiaki Konaka	March 6, 2003	October 5, 2003
Roger is given the message from Dorothy concerning what Angel told her. Alan releases Beck from jail to persuade him to reconstruct the Big Fau's interface, or face an order of execution as an alternative. Alex visits Gordon at his farm and asks about his memories, but when the latter says nothing, he covers the fields in flames, killing his father. Dastun shows Roger that another sleeper agent is still at large: Angel. While trying to find her, Roger discovers Vera in a tunnel, where she instructs him to tell Angel that the bird whose wings have been plucked will shed all its feathers and will turn into the beast it was before it evolved into a bird. She releases flares to alert the Union. The mansion suddenly comes under attack by scorpion-like machines, and Dorothy and Norman do their best to fend them off until the Big O manages to intervene. Roger finds out that Beck is behind the robots' attempt to capture Dorothy. She is taken, with Roger in hot pursuit, until he is stopped by a repaired and improved Big Duo.
24	"The Big Fight!"	Tetsuya Watanabe	Chiaki Konaka	March 13, 2003	October 12, 2003
The new Big Duo seems to have the upper hand due to its airborne capabilities. However, Roger is able to fire multiple missiles to weaken his opponent. Much to his surprise, the pilot of the Big Duo is Alan, who is directly linked to his Megadeus via multiple wires. Just as Alan prepares for the finishing blow, the spirit of Schwarzwald engulfs Alan inside the cords of the Megadeus, ascending him into the atmosphere. Roger finds Dorothy atop the ledge of a building, but he sees that her memory circuit has been stripped. Meanwhile, Alex thanks Beck for helping restore the Big Fau, and asks for assistance in recreating the city to his liking. Staring at Dorothy's motionless body, Roger contemplates her earlier question, whether or not he would fall in love with her if she was a human. While journeying underground, Angel stumbles upon a stage set of a cabin, where she was first told about the scars on her back as a child. Dastun walks into a movie theater, where he sees his memories displayed on film.
25	"The War of the Paradigm City"	Ikurō Satō	Chiaki Konaka	March 20, 2003	October 19, 2003
Several beams of light fall from the sky due to the Union's attack, demolishing the city. At the stage set, Vera is revealed to have rescued Gordon from being burned with his farm. She then says that Gordon had attempted to regain his memories by artificially cultivating children. Any children that had later reawakened their memories as adults were murdered by R.D. The people cast out of the city forty years ago because they were inferior to the other children established the Union to take revenge. Angel, maddened by Vera's priorities, prepares to kill her. Vera fights back using her whip, cruelly lashing her, when Roger suddenly arrives and subdues Vera. Gordon says that neither Roger nor Angel were a part of the artificial cultivation program, and that no one was able to remember what had happened forty years ago despite the occasional subconscious glimpse. He reveals that the Union does not exist, and the "attack" on the city is shown to be a gigantic set of stage lights hanging from above. He tells Angel that she is a memory due to the scars on her back, confusing her. As Alex waits in the Big Fau, he learns that he was one of the children in Gordon's experiment. Gordon remembers that he hired Roger long ago to conduct negotiations with "the director" to changes the roles of all "the actors" in the city. Vera activates a monstrous Megadeus, known as the Behemoth, before being unceremoniously destroyed when Roger calls the Big O to return to the surface. Roger and Alex face off, and prepare to have their final showdown.
26	"The Show Must Go On"	Kazuyoshi Katayama; Akira Yoshimura	Chiaki Konaka	March 27, 2003	November 2, 2003
The military police and the surviving citizens of the city watch as Roger and Alex fight each other, but it is not long until the Big O is overpowered due to the Big Fau's protective capabilities. As the Big Fau drags the Big O to the edge of the coast, intending to throw an unconscious Roger into the sea, Dastun rallies some of his men to fire their weapons. The Big O is dropped into the water, but wraps its chains around the Big Fau, pulling it down as well. Alex manages to break free of the chains, however, and swim to the surface, leaving Roger to sink deep into the ocean and drown. Meanwhile, in an elevator, Gordon tells Angel that she has the ability of containing or releasing memories prior to forty years ago. They arrive at their destination deep underground; Angel proceeds onward, while Gordon relinquishes his book and disappears. Underwater, Roger has visions of various realities of Paradigm City from unknown time periods. Dorothy, who manages to awaken without her memory circuit, dives into the water and saves him from drowning. Roger recovers and surfaces to face Alex once more, this time with Dorothy plugged into the Big O. This enables him to generate an enormous amount of energy and heavily damage the Big Fau. Before the two can finish each other off, a Megadeus known as the Big Venus appears, causing the environment around them to disappear. Alex and the Big Fau are vaporized. Before the city is reset, Roger attempts to negotiate with Angel, whose last name is revealed to be Rosewater, proclaiming that the people living in Paradigm City are defined by more than just their memories. Although he himself is unsure of his past, he concludes that he'll never forget meeting her, and implores Angel to "live as a human being." The Big O and the Big Venus merge into each other and vanish. The city seemingly resets, and Roger is shown driving through Paradigm City exactly as he did in the first episode, with Dorothy and Angel looking on. However, it is implied that the watch he uses to call Big O is not on his wrist.
