= List of The Big O characters =

The fictional characters of The Big O anime series were designed by series creator Keiichi Sato, who also designed characters for the City Hunter series. Because of union rules, most of the English voice cast for the first season were credited under pseudonyms. The only voice actors who used their real names were Lia Sargent (R. Dorothy Wayneright), Wendee Lee (Angel), Michael McConnohie (Schwarzwald) and William Frederick Knight (Gordon Rosewater).

== Main characters ==
=== Roger Smith ===
Voiced by: Mitsuru Miyamoto (Japanese); Steve Blum (English)

Roger Smith (ロジャー・スミス, Rojā Sumisu) is the series protagonist and the Negotiator (ネゴシエイター, Negoshieitā) for Paradigm City, also known as the "City of Amnesia." Roger's job is to resolve Paradigm City's troubles, but his personal feelings about Paradigm Corporation cause him to accept only jobs that either interest him or involve a threat to Paradigm City. When memories betray the people and force them to reawaken monsters from the city's past, Roger's only option is to fight back with a monster of his own, the black megadeus Big O. The Roger Smith character, originally envisioned as a private eye, shows similarities to Batman, James Bond, and Daisaku Kusama from Giant Robo.

Creation and Characterization

In 1996, Keichii Sato and Kazuyoshi Katayama began work on what would become The Big O. Looking to create something distinguishable from the Gundam franchise, they looked to old super robot series and American TV shows for inspiration. Sato's original concept was a giant city-smashing robot piloted by a man in black, Roger Smith. Inspired by detective shows like Oretachi wa Tenshi da! (We Are Angels!) and Tantei Monogatari (Detective Story), Roger was to be a private eye. However, the creators thought this to be too ordinary and turned him into a Negotiator. With a negotiator, it would be "made sure the negotiations never work out... so, it's guaranteed the robot always trashes the place!" However, as the series progresses, most of his cases either require an investigation before actual negotiations can proceed or they coincide with a police investigation. Thus, he ends up doing more detective work than negotiating.

Unique among robot shows, the protagonist is not a young boy but a "cool adult". Sato's reasoning behind the decision is he wanted to give young viewers someone to look up to and older viewers someone to identify with. In terms of personality, he starts off the series as a very arrogant, witty, sarcastic, and seemingly unconcerned individual to the point of being almost snide. In situations involving his work, however, he is professional to the extreme, masking any hint of potentially emotional behavior. He values logic and hates to feel out of control of either his emotions or whatever situation he is in. Thus, during negotiations, he maintains a calm, collected, and pleasant attitude.

As the series progresses, however, many of these traits are ironed out of his character, and he begins to exhibit a much more compassionate and open-minded attitude, learning how to cope with emotional issues and people instead of ignoring them. Some interesting incongruities pop up about his character as the story progresses. It is implied by Gordon Rosewater that Roger was alive before the Event and was not one of Gordon's genetically created children. Both he and Gordon refer to Roger as having "lost memories" even though he appears to be in his mid-twenties. Gordon specifically mentions a contract that he made with Roger prior to the Event. His flashbacks and hallucinations during the series would seem to indicate that he was a member of the military before the Event occurred, apparently holding the rank of major, and was Big O's pilot even then. These flashbacks also seem to support Gordon's position that Roger was indeed alive prior to the Event, and a photograph taken of Roger and a younger Gordon also seems to lend credence to the theory.

Roger's Rules

The Negotiator is portrayed as very methodical and strict. He has a number of rules and policies that dictate all aspects of his everyday life, from how people must behave in his house to the way he performs his job:

- "I have a special house rule that only lovely young women can unconditionally enter this mansion." (Act:01)
- "If you stay [in my house], then you wear black." (Act:02)
- "It's not my style to carry a gun." (Act:03)
- "I value women and the elderly. It's one of my policies." (Act:05)
- "If someone lacks courtesy and sincerity, I ask them to leave." (Act:05)
- "The most important rule of all is under no circumstances must anyone touch my desk!" (Act:08)
- "The basic rule of negotiating is to consider and respect the other person's feelings." (Act:08)
- "If you want to live a happy life in this city, leave memories alone when they pop up. That's Roger Smith's Rule No. 1." (Act:11)
- "You have to use your pent-up energy to fight through the harshness of reality. That's Roger Smith's Rule No. 2." (Act:11)
- "A Negotiator only uses force as a last resort." (Act:18)
- "Something else that goes against my policies--using violence against women." (Act:25)

Tools of the trade

The Griffon

Roger's wristwatch

Roger considers side arms unbecoming a gentleman, (though he has used them as tools, rather than weapons, on occasion) so he avails himself of a number of gadgets to aid his job. Inspirations for the equipment include characters such as Batman, James Bond and Dick Tracy; and shows like Thunderbirds, Giant Robo, and The Avengers.

Roger's vehicle of choice is the Griffon (グリフォン, Gurifon), a black luxury sedan comparable to the Batmobile and James Bond's Aston Martin. The car comes equipped with armor for the wheels and windows, missile launchers, a communications station, Browning machine guns behind the front indicators, smart glass camouflage, and a police scanner.

The Negotiator's second most important weapon is his wristwatch, the tool for summoning the Big O. By calling the megadeus' name into the watch, Roger informs the giant it is "Showtime!" and it comes to its master's side. The watch also works as a remote control to the Griffon and includes a grappling cable, a laser cutter and a two-way communicator.

Roger's greatest weapon is the Big O. A metal giant that, unlike the giants of other robot anime, does not exhibit speed nor grace. Although it lacks agility, it compensates for this with strength and resilience: The Big O is equipped with armed missiles, powered punches, machine guns and laser cannons.

Big O is transported around Paradigm City and out into the country via underground railway tunnels aboard the massive, quad-engine carrier train called the Prairie Dog, which has a telescoping chute that can deploy and recover Big O on the surface. It apparently operates via remote, as Roger's butler Norman deploys it to different parts of the city from the mansion when his master has need of it. When not in use, it rests in an underground railway junction beneath Roger's mansion. In the manga, it is revealed that this transport also carries interchangeable arms for Big O that can be exchanged easily, something that is not shown in the anime.

In addition to these tools, Roger has exhibited extraordinary physical conditioning throughout the series, and has been shown many times to be much more physically capable than most humans. Of particular note is his strength; he has been able to carry Dorothy on several occasions, once even holding her while jumping down around 15 feet, while it has been shown that any other character in the series who has attempted to so much as move her can hardly even budge her. Also, during his brief hand-to-hand fight with Alan Gabriel (who has been shown to have superhuman capabilities), he was able to not only hold his own, but floor the cyborg during their initial exchange. This level of physical ability is never explained, but the final episode of the show suggests, in one of several flashbacks that are themselves never explained, that Roger is himself an android not unlike Dorothy, designed for the purpose of piloting Big O.

=== R. Dorothy Wayneright ===
Voiced by: Akiko Yajima (Japanese); Lia Sargent (English)

R. Dorothy Wayneright (アール・ドロシー・ウェインライト, Āru Doroshī Weinraito) is Roger's personal assistant. Introduced in Act:01 as Dorothy Soldano, the kidnapped daughter of rich scientist Miguel Soldano, she is later revealed to be an android constructed by him. Her actual "father" would be Timothy Wayneright, the man who commissioned her construction and father of the real and presumably deceased Dorothy Wayneright. Roger rescues R. Dorothy, and to show her gratitude, and as a form of payment for Roger's help, she decides to move in with him and help out Norman with the chores. In occasional episodes, Dorothy accompanies Roger in his work as a negotiator.

Dorothy stands just under 5 feet (150 cm) tall, has red hair, chalk-white skin and much more body weight than her slender appearance reveals (about 130 kg or approximately 287 lbs.). Her dress is a size three. Her forehead houses an illuminated CD ROM drive, which is loaded from a drawer made to resemble an Alice band. While capable of normal human facial expression, in film-noir tradition she typically maintains a pouty contour and a mildly sarcastic personality, described by Angel as being "perpetually foul-tempered". Her dry wit is best reflected by her catchphrase "You're a louse, Roger Smith," her teasing response to Roger's sometimes unreasonable demands. She and Roger maintain playful retorts throughout the series, with Dorothy often going out of her way to irritate Roger or otherwise rattle his cage. Regardless, she has shown hints of romantic feelings towards Smith. Offsetting her straightforward attitude is her general likability; she gets along rather well with virtually everyone, even those with whom she harbors suspicion. From her conversation and behavior, it is evident that Dorothy has the capacity for human emotions. She has shown genuine fear on a number of occasions and reveals jealousy toward Angel's relationship with Roger and satisfaction from its failure to become romantic. An annoying habit (at least to Roger) is that she plays the piano loudly when he oversleeps, mostly due to his late nights on the job.

Dorothy is quite durable and much stronger than any human, able to punch down a brick wall with one blow or leap several dozen feet into the air. She has amazing balance, as seen during her moments of contemplation while standing precariously on the edge of Roger's balcony. R. Dorothy can run or bicycle at superhuman speed and does not require oxygen to operate. She shows superhuman coordination, performing effortless gymnastics and is able to steer a car with her foot while standing on the hood. That she takes regular meals with Roger indicates she can consume food and beverages, although she admits in episode 11 "Daemon Seed" not being able to taste. As she is fully mechanical, it is unknown if eating contributes to her operation. Dorothy also seems to have an unexplained connection to Big O itself. In eps. 20 and 21, when Dorothy is nearly destroyed by Alan Gabriel, Big O apparently senses this and shuts down in order to facilitate her rescue by Roger. In the final Act, she activates Big O's Final Stage weapon by plugging herself directly into the megadeus. She shows self-awareness and capacity for learning; throughout the series she exhibits talents at performance singing and virtuoso piano. It's suggested that the show's closing song "And forever" is R. Dorothy performing with a male vocalist, who may or may not be Roger. (In episode 8 "The Missing Cat" she can be heard humming it.)

Creation and Characterization

The character of R. Dorothy Wayneright is a creation of the series head writer, Chiaki J. Konaka. Until Konaka's involvement with the project in 1999, R. Dorothy was only known as "the android girl who lives with Roger." Her design was considerably changed, and the characterization followed suit. Series creators Keiichi Sato and Kazuyoshi Katayama call her "edgy" but "loveable", aiming for a realistic character rather than the idealized portrayal of females that persists in anime.

Dorothy shares a similarity in behavior, appearance and speech with the android Lal from Star Trek: The Next Generation episode ''The Offspring". The character has the same name as Dorothy Gale of The Wonderful Wizard of Oz, a work Konaka references occasionally in his scripts, and the "R" initial is for "Robot", a naming convention used by Isaac Asimov in his works. Her name may also be a reference to Dorothy Wainwright, a character from the 1980s British sitcom Yes, Prime Minister, of which Konaka is a fan.

=== Norman Burg ===
Voiced by: Motomu Kiyokawa (Japanese); Milton James (Season 1), Alan Oppenheimer (Season 2) (English)

Norman Burg (ノーマン・バーグ, Nōman Bāgu) is Roger's butler. Forty years ago he, along with all of Paradigm, lost all memories, but he wouldn't think twice before going once more unto the breach for his master. Resourceful and talented, he is also caretaker of the Big O robot. Aside from duties befitting a butler of a house, Norman is also a fine chef who makes it a point to keep hot food available for Roger no matter what time his employer's arrival home. Norman is older than Roger and has apparently lost an eye, which he keeps covered with a patch. The butler is a fatherly influence for both Smith and Dorothy, and the first defense of the Smith mansion, capable of using a number of firearms in case of attack, ranging from small handguns to high caliber machine guns. In the opening credits of the show, he's shown effectively handling a chain gun. Norman also displays a tendency to get involved in the relationship between Roger and Dorothy, "pushing" the two together for sake of the emotional good each does the other. Where Roger drives his limo, Dorothy makes use of a bicycle occasionally, Norman's form of transportation is a motorcycle outfitted with a sidecar, ridden while the butler comically wears a "stormtrooper" (Stahlheim) style helmet. Norman is grateful to Roger Smith for providing him a purpose and in return, Roger considers Norman his most trusted and infallible aide de camp. In the Manga, he has a running gag where he will inquire Roger on paying him, but Roger always manages to avoid it.

=== Dan Dastun ===
Voiced by: Tesshō Genda (Japanese); Peter Lurie (English)

Dan Dastun (ダン・ダストン, Dan Dasuton) is the middle-aged provost marshal of the military police, introduced in Act:01. In "Winter Night Phantom", Roger describes him as "a hard-nosed cop [...] completely devoted to the force, and he has more pride in the Military Police than anything else." He continues, "Paradigm City needs him as much as it needs [The Negotiator]." He is Roger's former commander, but they still maintain contact. Dastun resents having the force called the "watchdogs" of the Paradigm Corporation and has expressed his disdain for its executives.

Dastun himself gets a burst of memory in "Winter Night Phantom", of a movie he saw as a child. In the movie, a police officer is arguing with a woman holding a balloon on a dock, ending with him shooting her. Her dying words are "Vous-êtes si gentil" ("You are so kind"). In the present, Dastun began seeing a woman that looked exactly like the actress from the movie, Sybil Rowan, but not aged a day, roaming Paradigm City setting off explosions as a means of political assassination. This culminated in Dastun shooting her on a pier while she was holding a balloon, living out the scene from the movie. Towards the end of season 2, Dastun sees two children entering a theater to see the movie, the poster of which bills him as appearing, and when he follows to investigate, he finds they are child versions of himself and Sybil Rowan. Dastun's pride as a member of the military police puts him somewhat at odds with Roger after he resigns from the force, and he expresses an extreme amount of irritation every time Big O appears. At first this irritation is passed off as disliking the vigilante nature of the megadeus. However, as the series progresses, he reveals to Roger that his irritation stems from the fact that the military police do not have the ability to protect the city adequately due to frequent megadeus attacks. This requires Big O to step in fairly often to counter these attacks, which Dastun feels robs the military police of purpose. However, he comes to accept this during season two. He is also one of the few characters who know of Roger's affiliation with Big O, and the only such character within the police department. He was revealed to have obtained this knowledge at some point before season two but is only seen directly discussing it with Roger once.

=== Angel ===
Voiced by: Emi Shinohara (Japanese); Wendee Lee (English)

Angel (エンジェル, Enjeru) is the beautiful woman Roger encounters throughout the series. Introduced in Act:03 as Cassey Jenkins (according to the business card she gave to Roger), investigator for Paradigm Power Management, then again in Act:04 as Patricia Lovejoy, secretary for the publisher of Paradigm Press. In Act:07, it is revealed that she bears two long scars on her back, giving the impression that she once had wings; hence her name. Originally a recurring character, Angel was given top billing in Season Two. Her role is that of a femme fatale, the woman who deceptively misleads and ensnares the hero or other males in order to gain some end they would not freely help her achieve. Her interactions with Roger eventually force her into a somewhat different role. As the series progresses, she becomes more and more involved with Roger, even forsaking her duties to the union in order to feed him information, betraying them for Roger's sake. However, her relationship with Roger ultimately does not become romantic, as she believes him to be in love with Dorothy and, though he protests it, the opinion is further reinforced by Alan Gabriel's insistence that Roger "cares for [Dorothy] more than anyone". At the end of the series, she is shown to have some sort of special connection to whatever power controls their world, possibly even being that power herself (though this role is not adequately explained). She is also identified as one Gordon Rosewater's daughter and is identified as "Angel Rosewater" in Act:26. At the end of the final Act, a new version of her is seen (along with a new version of Dorothy) standing on the sidewalk as Roger drives to a negotiation. One reviewer calls Angel a "Fujiko clone" with a "body-hugging suit [that] would give Emma Peel a run for her money."

== Antagonists ==
=== Alex Rosewater ===
Voiced by: Unshō Ishizuka (Japanese); Michael Forest (English)

Alex Rosewater (アレックス・ローズウォーター, Arekkusu Rōzuwōtā) is the primary antagonist of the series. He is the chairman of the Paradigm Group (パラダイム社, Paradaimu Sha) and the son of Paradigm City's founder. Alex shows great contempt for the poor of Paradigm and the foreigners living in the city; going so far as to appreciate some of the catastrophes that befall the city as they "clean up some of that abominable mess" (referring to the people outside the domes). For Alex, Paradigm's true citizens are those within the domes. Alex always wears a white suit in direct contrast to Roger Smith's black one.

Alex possesses an unquenchable thirst for power, and an "ends justify the means" philosophy. Despite being more or less the absolute ruler of Paradigm City, Alex harbors dreams of even greater power and will stop at nothing to achieve them. The power that he desires is the power of the megadei, specifically the "Big" type megadei, as he believes that their pilots are "agents of the power of God". Alex sees himself as privileged as being the son of Gordon Rosewater, and at times acts as a "spoiled child", as observed by Vera Ronstadt. Although he appreciates the power of Big Fau, he treats it as his toy, even going so far as to crafting a miniature version of Big Fau to play with as seen in Act 22.

As Season 2 goes on, Alex develops a messianic complex, after reconstructing Big Fau and starting to pilot it. Initially, he is rejected by the megadeus as its pilot after using it to easily destroy a Union megadeus. After the Union megadeus was dealt with, Big Fau displayed the message "Ye Not" as it fired its dorsal beams into the already damaged cityscape. He manages to get it to work properly only after rigging it with Dorothy's memory core, so it is unknown if he is indeed its true pilot. After he enters the megadeus for the second time, his mental state seems to continually degrade much like Schwarzwald's did after coming into contact with Big Duo. During the Union bombardment of Paradigm, he declares that he will create a new world and destroy those who don't deserve to live in his world, specifically the people who live outside the domes and the Union. It is revealed in Act 25 by Big Fau that he is not really Gordon's son but merely one of his many artificial children. As his battle with Roger drags on, Big Fau inserts cables into Alex's back, apparently fusing itself with him. Though half of Big Fau is vaporized by Big O's Final Stage weapon, Alex survives and aims to finish Roger off - however, before he can do so, he is erased by Big Venus.

=== Alan Gabriel ===
Voiced by: Issei Futamata (Japanese); Crispin Freeman (English)

Alan Gabriel (アラン・ゲイブリエル, Aran Geiburieru) is an eccentric psychopath, a cyborg who takes Angel's place as Rosewater's assistant and the Union's liaison in season two. Gabriel's real agenda is somewhat nebulous, though it would appear that he is straddling the fence between the Union and Rosewater, depending on who will give him the opportunity to kill the most people. He seems to have a particularly gruesome hobby of dismantling androids while they still function, as he claims to despise androids, despite being half-mechanical by choice. After attempting to kill Dorothy and subsequently being foiled by Roger, Alan seems to make killing Roger his top priority.

=== Vera Ronstadt ===
Voiced by: Sayuri Yamauchi (Japanese); Carolyn Hennesy (English)

Vera Ronstadt (ヴェラ・ロンシュタット, Vera Ronshutatto), introduced in Act:20, leads the Union's (ユニオン, Yunion) agents within Paradigm. Vera made a deal with Alex Rosewater in which the Union would deliver the parts to construct Big Fau for Alex, but he then reneged on the deal and hunted down all of the Union members. Towards the end of season 2 Vera claimed to be Angel's mother, although given that Angel's memories of her mother appear to have been fabricated, Vera may not have been speaking in the genetic sense.

== Recurring characters ==
=== Big Ear ===
Voiced by: Shinpachi Tsuji (Japanese); Jamieson Price (English)

Big Ear (ビッグイヤー, Biggu Iyā) is Roger's informant. He hangs around the Speakeasy, always reading the newspaper that is revealed in the finale to record the future. During the final episode, Big Ear is revealed to be an android, with synthetic skin applied over a metallic body, although this is not the case in the manga. His name likely comes from his almost comically large ears, which usually have in ear headphones, presumably to feed information. He also usually wears a kippah.

=== Jason Beck ===
Voiced by: Hochu Ohtsuka (Japanese); Bob Buchholz (English)

Jason Beck (ジェイソン・ベック, Jeison Bekku), sometimes referred to as Beck Gold (due to his overall appearance) is introduced as Dorothy's kidnapper in the series premiere. After "being humiliated" by Roger during the kidnapping case, Beck's further appearances on the show consist of his trying to humiliate Roger back. However, his plans continually degrade from sinister and dangerous to almost comical in nature. As Dorothy puts it "You never learn, do you?", since he's tried to use her multiple times in the past as a key component to his machines. He also seems to have numerous memories relating to the operations and abilities of the Megadeus, including one pertaining specifically to Roger's identity as the pilot of Big O. Beck becomes Alex Rosewater's agent after Alan Gabriel threatens him with an order of execution but is unhappy with this situation despite both a successful attack on Roger and a considerable compensation. Thus, he betrays Rosewater and ends up aiding Roger in the final Act by telling Dorothy how to activate Big O's Final Stage. Beck apparently is a satire of Lupin III, due to his lanky appearance and goofy behavior.

=== Schwarzwald ===
Voiced by: Katsunosuke Hori (Japanese); Michael McConnohie (English)

Schwarzwald (シュヴァルツ・ヴァルト, Shuvarutsu Varuto; lit. "Black Forest") first appears in Act:04, "Underground Terror". His real name is Michael Seebach (マイクル・ゼーバッハ, Maikuru Zēbahha), a reporter for Paradigm Press. As a reporter, Seebach was obsessed with bringing the truth to the people of Paradigm City, but became frustrated as the Paradigm Corporation continually censored his work. Eventually his search for the truth would become an obsession, and Seebach began living a double life. In time he became even more obsessed with his work and cut himself off from human contact, including his wife and children. But Seebach's obsession also resulted with an attempt on his life by Paradigm which disfigured his face.

Seebach eventually decided to journey into the underground of Paradigm City, where he encounters a megadeus Archetype, with him running off after Big O's fight with the Archetype. He reappears in Act:12, as the pilot of Big Duo.

In Act:17, thousands of copies of Schwarzwald's writings, a prophecy foretelling the coming of the Leviathan, peppered the city. By episode's end, it is revealed Schwarzwald has been dead for a long time. Schwarzwald appears to Big Duo's new pilot, Alan Gabriel, in Act:24. The apparition declares Gabriel not worthy of piloting it and, subsequently, the megadeus kills him. Schwarzwald's final act is a letter delivered to Roger Smith. The contents of the letter are unknown but may be the monologue on the nature of "truth" delivered by Schwarzwald in voice over. Roger Smith wondered "if [Schwarzwald] was still wandering the city relentlessly in search of his own personal truth, even after his body had perished."

In the Manga, his appearance before the accident is revealed. He seemed to be a middle-aged man with a short beard, dressed in a trench coat and hat. It also reveals the origin to his alias, as it was part of a poem his mother taught him when he was a child.

=== Gordon Rosewater ===
Voiced by: Goro Naya (Japanese); William Frederick Knight (English)

Gordon Rosewater (ゴードン・ローズウォーター, Gōdon Rōzuwōtā) is often credited as the man responsible for the construction of Paradigm City, and the original founder and chairman of the Paradigm Corporation. Gordon's son Alex Rosewater took over his father's duties when he retired. Gordon spends much of his time in a private dome of his own growing tomatoes.

Gordon appears to be perfectly content with the uncertainties of the past, much to the dismay of those who come to him for memories, including his own son. While many look to him for answers, Gordon typically appears to be rather senile, or at least very apathetic. However, his odd speeches about his tomatoes appear to actually be a cryptic euphemism to answer the question.

Roger Smith has a recurring flashback of a man in a bloodstained surgeon's uniform standing before a group of children, and Roger believes this man to be Gordon Rosewater, implanting memories of the past into a younger generation. Gordon refuses to comment on this accusation directly, but, referring to his tomato crop, states "these tomatoes are reproduced synthetically, with only the memories of the sweet flavor from the original. If we keep repeating the process, this fruit will eventually become the real thing." He does not appear to have actually lost any of his memories however, as he has moments of apparently random lucidity throughout the series during which he reveals important clues to the Event. At the end of the series, he apparently regains both his mind and his interest in the city's past, explaining to Roger, Angel, and Vera several important truths about Paradigm and each of their various existences (Roger and Angel not being genetically engineered for example).

== Minor characters ==
=== Timothy Wayneright ===
Timothy Wayneright

Voiced by: Takkou Ishimori (Japanese); Kevin Seymour (English)

Timothy Wayneright (ティモシー・ウェインライト, Timoshī Weinraito) is introduced in Act:02 as R. Dorothy's grandfather, but turns out to be the man who commissioned its construction using his daughter Dorothy's memories. In "Negotiations with the Dead", it is revealed Wayneright's work was being funded and supported by the Union.

In Act:14, Roger sees a young Wayneright walking into the Nightingale club alongside the human Dorothy.

=== R. Instro ===
Voiced by: Akio Nojima (Japanese); Kirk Thornton (English)

R. Instro (R・インストル, Āru Insutoru) is an android introduced in Act:06. He is a very gifted concert pianist who gives Dorothy lessons. Instro was constructed by Amadeus, a scientist whose work was bankrolled by Paradigm until he was murdered by his research partner, Giesing.

R. Instro reappears in Act:17, now expressing his skills as an organist in one of Paradigm City's churches.

In the manga, he was arrested as a serial killer due to the fact his hands match what an eyewitness saw. It later turns out he was innocent, and the crimes were being perpetrated by a cyborg who regained his memories.

=== Sybil Rowan ===
The Winter Night Phantom

Voiced by: Sakiko Tamagawa (Japanese); Mona Marshall (English)

The name of Sybil Rowan (シベール・ロアン, Shibēru Roan) applies to two different characters in Act:10.

- The first is an actress and anti-government activist expelled from the city 30 years before. She starred in Winter Night Phantom, a movie Dastun saw as a child and now remembers as a recurring dream.
- The second character is the bomber featured in the episode. She identifies herself as "Phantom" (ファントム, Fantomu) after Rowan's film. Her death at the hands of Dastun parallels that film's ending and it is shown that a young Dastun watched the film with a young girl in the theater, the implication being that she is either a childhood friend or his sister.

=== R.D. ===
Red Destiny

Voiced by: Akiko Yajima (Japanese); Lia Sargent (English)

R.D. (アール-ディ, Āru-Di), short for Red Destiny (レッド・デスティニー, Reddo Desutinī), is the titular character of the first-season finale. She is R. Dorothy's "doppleganger", an android of the same make and model. R.D is a serial killer who targets foreigners that claim to have memories of forty years prior. Her calling card is a message that reads "Cast in the Name of God, Ye not Guilty", the same reading on the Megadeuses screens when activated. She is destroyed after Big O mysteriously reactivates and arrives to protect Roger Smith.

Though identical to Dorothy physically, R.D has a more robotic, computerized voice, and displays psychotic facial expressions as she chases Roger through the subways. The character is seen again, through flashback, during "Negotiations With The Dead". In Act:25, it is revealed she was activated by Alex Rosewater.
