= Gate Keepers =

Japanese media franchise

- Cover image of the first volume featuring Shun Ukiya (right) and Ruriko Ikusawa (left).

ゲートキーパーズ (Gēto Kīpāzu)
- Genre: Harem, science fiction, mecha
- Video game
- Developer: Entertainment Software Publishing
- Publisher: Kadokawa Shoten
- Genre: Tactical role-playing game
- Platform: PlayStation
- Released: December 19, 1999
- Manga
- Written by: Hiroshi Yamaguchi
- Illustrated by: Keiji Gotoh
- Published by: Kadokawa Shoten
- English publisher: US: Tokyopop
- Magazine: Ace Next
- Original run: 1999 – 2001
- Volumes: 3
- Anime television series
- Directed by: Junichi Sato (chief); Koichi Chigira
- Written by: Hiroshi Yamaguchi
- Music by: Kohei Tanaka
- Studio: Gonzo
- Licensed by: Crunchyroll; US: Geneon
- Original network: WOWOW
- English network: SEA: AXN
- Original run: April 3, 2000 – September 18, 2000
- Episodes: 24
- Novel

Gate Keepers 1985
- Written by: Ko Yamaguchi (山口宏, Yamaguchi Kō)
- Illustrated by: Akiko Asaki (朝来昭子, Asaki Akiko), Hideyuki Takenami (竹浪秀行, Takenami Hideyuki)
- Published: January 30, 2003
- Related
- Gate Keepers 21

Gate Keepers (ゲートキーパーズ, Gēto Kīpāzu) is a tactical role-playing game developed by Entertainment Software Publishing and published by Kadokawa Shoten for the PlayStation. The game was then adapted into a manga series written by Hiroshi Yamaguchi and drawn by Keiji Gotoh and an anime series produced by Gonzo, and first aired on April 3, 2000. A six episode original video animation (OVA) sequel, Gate Keepers 21, was released in 2002. The main characters in the OVA sequel were the next generation of Gate Keepers.

All Gate Keepers series follow the same basic premise and share most of their characters, with some major discrepancies (mainly involving the character Reiji Kageyama). A character from the game, Francine Allumage is completely absent from the anime. Another character from the game Misao Sakamori, was replaced in the anime with the new original character Megumi Kurogane (though Misao does make a guest appearance towards the end of the anime).

== Plot ==
The story is set in 1969, a period of time in which Japan is experiencing intense economic and social development after the end of World War II in 1945. Unbeknownst to humans, alien/interdimensional beings have emerged with plans to take over the world by sending numerous agents to wreak havoc in cities, turning people into robotic minions. They are referred to as "Invaders" (インベーダー, Inbēdā).

In an attempt to confront the Invaders and defend the planet, an elite but highly secret organization of peace-keepers called the Alien Exterminating Global Intercept System (more commonly known as A.E.G.I.S.), was set up with special funding from the government. They rely on the ability of "Gate Keepers", who have the power to open dimensional "gates" of a paranormal energy that give them their superpowers. These superpowers are the only weapons that have any effect on Invaders.

Although A.E.G.I.S. has branches around the world, the series focuses on the Far East division in Japan. The headquarters of the Far East branch of A.E.G.I.S. lies beneath Tategami High School, a facade created by the organization to mask the active recruitment of new Gate Keepers. Since many of the candidates were High School students, the location allowed the agents to be enrolled in school and be available for a mission at a moment's notice.

== Characters ==
=== A.E.G.I.S. members ===
Names with asterisks indicates an anime-only character.

Shun Ukiya (浮矢 瞬, Ukiya Shun)
Voiced by: Takahiro Sakurai (Japanese); Randy McPherson (English)
Shun Ukiya, the focus of the series, is a young Japanese schoolboy (who permanently wears a bandage over his nose, the only exception being his appearance in the final chapter of Gatekeepers 21) with a deep passion for kendo. Shun discovers that he has the ability to open the Gate of Gales in a chance encounter with an Invader attack near his hometown, where he meets fellow Gate Keeper and childhood friend, Ruriko Ikusawa. He is subsequently invited to join A.E.G.I.S. after discovering the existence of Invaders and of A.E.G.I.S. Skills he developed after discovering his Gate includes 'Ultra Senpuu Kiri (Ultra Whirlwind Slash)' and 'Shinkuu Missile (Vacuum Missile)'. Its later revealed near the end of the tv series that he has secretly held romantic feelings for Ruriko since childhood. They become a couple at the end of the TV Series. His Gate is considered to be among the most powerful Gates to have been discovered. It's later revealed that he inherited the Gate of Wind from his father. His Gate color is blue.
Ruriko Ikusawa (生沢 ルリ子, Ikusawa Ruriko)
Voiced by: Ayako Kawasumi (Japanese); Wendee Lee (English)
Ruriko is one of the first Gate Keepers recruited in Japan by A.E.G.I.S. and controls the Gate of Life. Ruriko is the unhappy bearer of the nickname 'Rurippe' (pronounced "RU-RI-PE"), which Shun relates it to her childhood appearance as the one who always has a runny nose. Viewed as a model student and an active participant in school activities, Ruriko only snaps when Shun uses her nickname in public. Her original ability involves a healing light and she utilizes it for combat through the materialization of a bow and arrow. She is taken by Reiji Kageyama and is convinced to hate others, thus changing her Gate into the Minus Gate of Genocide (a gate, according to Misao Sakimori, that should never be opened because of the devastation it brings). When she discovers that her secret love for Shun is reciprocated, her hatred fades and restores her Gate of Life. She and Shun become a couple at the end of the TV Series. Her Gate color is yellow.
Reiko Asagiri (朝霧 麗子, Asagiri Reiko)
Voiced by: Mayumi Iizuka (Japanese); Julie Ann Taylor (English)
Despite the fact that Reiko is an extremely forgetful and absent-minded girl (perhaps a result of the shock from the divorce of her parents), she is an extremely talented pianist who discovered her Gate of Illusion when Invaders attacked her during her very first public recital at a theater. Her ability to create illusions while playing music does not go unnoticed by Invaders, who suffer intense agony when they hear her melodies. She is the only Gate Keeper other than Shun Ukiya who has operated the prototype Unit 00 Gate Robo, and the only one to pilot a jet aircraft. But, individually, she utilizes any keyboard musical instrument as a weapon (like a melodica). In the final episodes, after seeing one of her comrades getting hit, she snapped, unleashing the full force of her Gate's powers. Her Gate color is pink.
Kaoru Konoe (近衛 薫, Konoe Kaoru)
Voiced by: Naoko Takano (Japanese); Michelle Ruff (English)
A tomboyish athlete, Kaoru was tormented by her previous stint in the track team. She awoke her own Gate of Close Combat, which increases her natural physical abilities to insane proportions, to create such a logic defying world record for sprinting that it was revoked. She jumped at the chance to join A.E.G.I.S. so that she could use her abilities without restraint, and to 'steal Shun from Ruriko'. She wears her PE uniform; a white shirt with her class tag and blue burūmā, when fighting Invaders. Her skills include 'Kaoru Punch' and 'Kaoru Kick', among other self-named close combat fighting styles, and her incredible lifting and stopping abilities (like her Hustle move, where she lifts heavy objects and turns them into projectiles) Her Gate color is blue, like Shun's.
Misao Sakimori (防人 操, Sakimori Misao)
Voiced by: Hiroko Konishi (Japanese); Patricia Ja Lee (English)
A small German-Japanese girl from A.E.G.I.S. Germany who maintains the Gate of Perception. She operates Gate Robo Unit 03. In the game she plays a bigger role and is one of the first characters to join the player. In the game Misao controls the Gate of Walls. Her role was replaced by Megumi in the anime who is an anime only character. In the anime, her Gate of Perception gives her powerful and accurate precognitive abilities. Her Gate color is green.
Megumi Kurogane (鉄 恵, Kurogane Megumi)*
Voiced by: Rikako Aikawa (Japanese); Patricia Ja Lee (English)
This mumbling asocial girl has the ability to set up force fields around herself with her Gate of Walls (Gate of Steel in other translations). She resembles Misao Sakimori in some aspects but their personalities are totally different. Megumi has a secret loathing for Ruriko — she is bitterly jealous of Ruriko's wealth, intelligence and popularity (which contrasts with her own state of living, being a delivery girl for a noodle shop) and hates it when Ruriko outshines her without seeming to put forth any effort. She is a member of A.E.G.I.S. but does not appear to be particularly interested in socializing with her fellow Gate Keepers. She eventually joins Reiji and the Invaders when Reiji promises to 'recognize her true abilities.' She gains a Minus Gate, the Gate of Invasion (which allows her to invade into the minds of others), but Reiji betrays her when Ruriko becomes good again. Megumi replaces the role of Misao from the game though both characters share the same gate they both have very different personalities. Her Gate color is green.
Feng Fei Ling (鳳妃玲 (フェン·フェイリン), Fen Fei Rin; Chinese: Fèng Fēilíng)
Voiced by: Chinami Nishimura (Japanese); Bridget Hoffman (English)
Wielder of the Gate of Fire, Fei hails from the Chinese (Shanghai) branch of A.E.G.I.S., and joined the Japanese branch to help out with the high concentration of Invader activity. Her companion, a golden monkey called Shun (a licensed A.E.G.I.S. agent—but was once confused with Shun Ukiya), often helps her target Red Invaders. Her skills include 'Da Xiong Mao' (Exploding Panda Fireball) and a fiery dragon (Shocking Fire Dragon). According to a flashback, her brother and grandfather were taken away from their house in China by unidentified men (possibly a reference to the Cultural Revolution), never to be seen again. Her Gate color is red.
Jun Thunders (ジュン·サンダース, Jun Sandāsu)
Voiced by: Kikuko Inoue (Japanese); Mary Elizabeth McGlynn (English)
A fashion model from the United States of America who is affiliated with A.E.G.I.S. (in the game she actually joins the A.E.G.I.S. branch quite early on as she has been transferred there from the American branch). She controls the Gate of Lightning and is the operator of Gate Robo Unit 02. She plays a bigger role in the game and has a lot more character development since she is one of the main characters. Her Gate color is violet.
Francine Allumage (フランシーヌ·アリュマージュ, Furanshīnu Aryumaju)
Voiced by: Junko Iwao
Francine only appears in the game and manga. She controls the Gate of Heat and Explosion (Fei actually uses this gate in the anime whereas in the game Fei's gate was the Gate of a Hundred Animals). Francine was originally assigned to the French branch since she is French. She is later assigned to the A.E.G.I.S. branch. Despite being French in origin, she is actually a western film lover and speaks fluent English. In her game image song she mentions two of the most famous western film stars (John Wayne and Clint Eastwood). Although she likes America she has never actually been there despite the fact that she usually cracks American jokes. She is a cheerful, fun-loving girl whose goal in life is to make 1000 friends.
Hōjō Yukino (北条 雪乃)
Voiced by: Masami Suzuki (Japanese); Lia Sargent (English)
She is the oldest Gate Keeper in Japan, having been born in 1169. However, she has stopped aging and appears in 1969 as a young girl in a white kimono (and again in Gate Keepers 21 without any trace of aging). Like her name Yukino suggests, she commands the Gate of Ice and Snow, being able to summon blizzards and hail. She is one of the most powerful Gate Keepers in the series, being referred to as a 'top-secret, High-Level Gate Keeper A.E.G.I.S. has been hiding' by Reiji Kageyama. One of her unique traits is the fact that she converses in Tanka poetry. She does help the A.E.G.I.S. members, despite being not an official member of A.E.G.I.S. She also has her pet ermine Hisame with her. She returns in Gate Keepers 21. In the game Yukino is actually a hidden character, but if she joins, she interacts more with the main characters and actually attends the same school as them (she joins the same class Fei is in) unlike the anime where she usually keeps her distance from the rest of the characters. Her Gate color is white.
Chotaro Banba (番場 長太郎, Banba Chōtarō) (a.k.a. Bancho or Big Boss)*
Voiced by: Takehito Koyasu (Japanese); Kirk Thornton (English)
The over-enthusiastic Osakan gangster-turned-good, Bancho was recruited into the team only because Shun believed Bancho 'has the eyes of a Gate Keeper'. With the mindset of a samurai, Bancho likens the girls in the Gate Keepers team as princesses and himself as their hero. It is only much, much later in the series that he reveals his latent Gate Keeper ability, the Gate of Solid Crush, which seemingly attracts Kaoru (perhaps because of the similarity of their gates). His Gate color is orange.
Voice actor Koyasu also appeared as himself in one of the later episodes.
Kanetake Meguro (目黒 兼武, Meguro Kanetake)
Voiced by: Etsuko Kozakura (Japanese); Melissa Fahn (English)
The head of the mechanics department of AEGIS. Megane, as he is fondly called, is a genius kid who can easily repair machines. In both the game and anime he helps the Gate Keepers by bringing the Gate Engine or Gate Robo to them, even restoring an out-of-commission Gate Robo (after the battle at the Tokyo Tower). In the anime he is good friends with Bancho who often helps Megane with the mechanics. "Megane" is Japanese for spectacles or glasses and is a common nickname for kids who wear glasses in Japan; he is called Specs in the English version.
Voice actor Kozakura also appeared as herself in one of the later episodes.
Commander (司令, Shirei)
Voiced by: Kinryū Arimoto (Japanese); Jamieson Price (English)
The commander of the A.E.G.I.S. Far-East Branch oversees the operations and deployments of Japan's Gate Keepers. He was an ensign in the Imperial Japanese Navy during World War II, and was supposed to fly an Ohka piloted bomb on a suicide mission in 1945, near the end of World War II. However, his mothership was shot down, and ironically, he was the sole survivor. When he attempted to commit suicide with a pistol after being rescued by the US Navy, he was restrained by a sailor who told him two words: "Stay alive." This changed his life and after the war he was one of the first members of the Police Reserve (later the Japan Self Defense Force). In the PlayStation Gate Keepers RPG and the Gate Keepers 1985 novel, it is revealed that the Commander's name is Tetsuya Tokiwatari (時渡 哲也, Tokiwatari Tetsuya) and he has the Gate of Time and Space.
Keiko Ochiai (落合 恵子, Ochiai Keiko)
Voiced by: Miki Nagasawa (Japanese); Lynn Fischer (English)
The private secretary to the Commander (Shirei) and is practically Second-in-Command of A.E.G.I.S. Far East (in Shirei's absence). She is also the school nurse at Tategami High School. She hates violence and acts as an adviser to the Gate Keepers (both at school and when they perform their Gate Keeper duties). Despite her feelings for the Commander, she was briefly engaged (an arranged marriage) to a man who was revealed to be an Invader.
Jim Skylark (ジム·スカイラーク, Jimu Sukairāku)*
Voiced by: Shin-ichiro Miki (Japanese); Steven Blum (English)
A British racer who drives a Lotus Seven (Caterham Seven) and is a member of A.E.G.I.S. England sent to Japan by A.E.G.I.S. HQ. He controls the Gate of Supersonic, and is uses it in conjunction with Gate Robo Unit 01. Overconfident after beating the top brass of the Invaders in their first encounter on Dream Island, he got himself killed by one accurate blast from Kikai Shogun's tank in a rematch. Luckily Ruriko was just around and revived him. His Gate color is blue.

=== Invaders ===
Reiji Kageyama (影山 零士, Kageyama Reiji)
Voiced by: Tomokazu Seki (Japanese); Johnny Yong Bosch (English)
At a young age by many tragedies in his family, his original Gate of Foresight was warped into the Jet-Black Gate of Darkness. The Gate of Darkness allows him to do many things unavailable to the other Gate Keepers. For example, he is able to transport objects, change his outfit and perform a variety of attacks. He possesses clairvoyance, which the Commander theorizes helped him open his gate initially by allowing him to 'Grasp a future beyond his reach'. A formidable enemy, Kageyama's secret identity is not discovered until it was too late, even though he had been befriended by Ukiya as a student of Tategami High School. In the anime, his real name is revealed to be Yuji Mitsuoka (光山 有士, Mitsuoka Yūji), the son of a rich man who was duped by one of his associates. He returns in Gate Keepers 21 as a middle-aged businessman working for A.E.G.I.S. Network, and is seen riding a blue TVR Tuscan. He is missing several body parts such as his arm, leg, and internal organs due to the overuse of his Gate.
Count Akuma (悪魔伯爵, Akuma Hakushaku; lit. 'Count Demonic')
Voiced by: Hidekatsu Shibata (Japanese); Michael McConnohie (English)
The evil Count is a top ranking Invader who manipulates the minds of people into believing false ideas and twisting their hearts to suit the needs of the Invaders. He once even had the Gate Keepers in his trap. He returns in Gate Keepers 21 to battle his archenemy's daughter, only to be defeated. His name is also known as Baron Akuma in the English translation of the anime.
Kaiser Kikai (機械将軍, Kikai Shōgun; lit. 'General Mechanical')
Voiced by: Shōzō Iizuka (Japanese); Tom Wyner (English)
This Nazi-like character with a deep, raspy voice and a "Heil Vader!" catchphrase is a top Invader with the power to control machinery. He was said to have caused the disappearance of the SS Marine Sulphur Queen in the Bermuda Triangle and made it resurface 6 years later standing up in Yokohama Bay. He first appears trying to control the first Shinkansen and sends it on a destructive maiden journey. He also returns in Gate Keepers 21 only to be defeated by the daughter of the man who defeated him, with the gate engine.
Yasutaka Fukuoka (福岡康隆, Fukuoka Yasutaka)
Voiced by: Kaneto Shiozawa (Japanese); Kevin Seymour (English)
He was a teacher at Tategami High, and, despite being Megumi Kurogane's favorite teacher, is hated by most of the students. He is a red Invader with fake identity papers and armed with a chalk-shooting gun. It was slain by Shun Ukiya right in front of Megumi.
Itoi (糸井)
Voiced by: Norio Wakamoto (Japanese); Daran Norris (English)
Ochiai-kun's Fiance, he's obnoxious and loudmouthed, therefore making him a perfect candidate for an Invader.
Nishiya (西谷)
Voiced by: Kinryu Arimoto (Japanese); Dan Woren (English)
The fiance of Ochiai's high school classmate who chased her and Shirei after knowing they know his true identity. Being a race driver, he has an unusual obsession to become Number One. He drove a Nissan Skyline GT-R KPGC10 "Hakosuka."

=== Others ===
Saemi Ukiya (浮矢 朗美, Ukiya Saemi)
Voiced by: Chiemi Chiba (Japanese); Sherry Lynn (English)
Shun's younger sister. She supports her big brother on his activities with the AEGIS. She has a crush on a boy named Takeshi Ikeda. She also appears in Gate Keepers 21 as Ayane's aunt. Only appears in the anime.

=== Forms and disguises ===
Invader Soldier
The Invader soldier unit usually resembles a humanoid robot in black suit, hat, dark glasses and holding a suitcase. Combined together in Fusion Mode, they create the more powerful and larger versions of Invaders of which can take multiple forms like centipedes, balls, and fake highways. Their weakness is the Red Invader, who initiates the Fusion and if destroyed, will cause a similar chain reaction to the other Invaders in the same form. The Invaders are not human but they can take on the appearance of a human in the original series.
Cyclopean Dog
An Invader that was disguised as an irritable Japanese Spitz. Feng Fei Ling initially thought that its keeper, a vendor of stone-roasted yams, was the Invader, but it revealed itself after being confronted by Shun and the other Gatekeepers.
Six-Engined Jumbo Jet
One of the many forms of the Invaders taking the form of a six-engined jumbo jet. It turned into a dinosaur then into a Concorde when Shun Ukiya shot one of its engines and crashed. It was finally put out of commission by Fei Fen Ring with the help of the Gate Engine.
ET-11 Ball-Type Invader
This conglomeration of Invaders first appeared in the first episode, attacking the A.E.G.I.S. bus carrying the Gate Engine. Its core is the red Invader. According to A.E.G.I.S. archives, it first appeared in Los Angeles.
ET-13 Drill-Type Invader
Also made an appearance as a dam buster in Germany, this one wreaked havoc in a shopping mall in Shibuya.
Twin-Barreled Tank
Also appearing in Europe, this one is commandeered by Kaiser Kikai himself and merged with a junked battleship on Dream Island. With the tank, Kaiser Kikai was able to defeat the combined (and overconfident) forces of Gate Robo Units 1-3, seriously injuring Jim Skylark in the process.
"Chef Boyardee"-style Invader
A cross between a giant billboard and a building. Made its appearance at the start of the "Sally Forth, Gate-Robo!" episode, which Reiko Asagiri accidentally revived with her Maiden's Prayer.
Highway-Type Invader
Disguised itself as part of the Tomei Highway, allowing it to strike unexpectedly and flatten any car in the highway, only to vanish and go undetected. This was the first invader Kaoru Konoe has ever encountered.

== A.E.G.I.S. weapons, transport and gear ==
Gate Engine
The Gate Engine is a device that is able to amplify the abilities of a Gate Keeper. However, due to its size, it requires support personnel to transport it to and from the battlefield. Using this device, Konoe Kaoru was able to stop a runaway Shinkansen a la Superman, and Fei Fen Ring was able to down the Concorde-shaped Invader. It was shrunk to fit inside the Gate Robo--whose design was invented by Shun's father.
Gate Robo
A mecha that uses a more compact version of the Gate Engine as its power source. Ukiya uses the Prototype Unit 00 Gate Robo, which is known for its extreme instability and unpredictability. Units 01, 02, and 03 are used by Jim Skylark, June Thunders, and Misao Sakimori respectively and amplifies their Gates even more. Aside from Ukiya, Reiko Asagiri has also operated Unit 00, and used its secret weapon, the "GRO5V" (see below), to activate her Gate of Illusions. Unit 00 was initially disabled by Reiji Kageyama's Shadow Robot at the battle atop the Tokyo Tower by smashing its Gate Engine, but Megane found an original prototype gate engine in the Ukiya garage, reviving it. This is the same engine that was used by Ukiya to eventually defeat Kageyama in front of live national TV.
GRO5V
The Gate Robo Unit 00's secret weapon; essentially a giant piano. However, Ukiya does not know how to play the piano, so Reiko Asagiri uses it when operating the Gate Robo. Unlike the Gate Engine, this big machine requires lesser support personnel to transport it to and from the battlefield--it can just be dropped into the battlefield with a Vertol 3000.
UP-15
It is a modified Toyota Sports 800 bearing the license plate AEGIS 01, powered by a Gate Engine, and is capable of using Shun Ukiya's Gate of Gales to reach incredible speeds. When it exits, the front of Tategami High erupts in a blinding sandstorm, which is a cover as the A.E.G.I.S. hangar doors open and the car exits. Ukiya even ran the car on tracks designed for a roller coaster in an effort to hurry to the scene of a battle. It is transportable to any location via a transport truck disguised as a tanker and is available on call within three minutes. It is referred to by Megane as the "Yota-hachi." As of Gate Keepers 21, it was the only working mecha remaining inside the ruins of A.E.G.I.S. Far East. After a brief hunt for Invaders, it was programmed by Ayane Isuzu to self-destruct (by overloading its Gate Engine) to destroy Kikai Shogun and his minions.
BB5005 Electric Locomotive
An electric locomotive loaned from A.E.G.I.S. France to help stop the runaway Shinkansen possessed by Kikai Shogun. It was the fastest locomotive in France, breaking speed records (at speeds in excess of 200 km/h).
A.E.G.I.S. Bus
It is a battle carrier disguised as an old Toyota bus. Upon command, it reveals its armor and communications equipment. It is also armed on both sides with two five-barreled anti-Invader cannons and a ramming bumper. It also transported the first Gate Engine to be used, then, after adding a launch button, used as a carrier for the Gate Robo.
Vertol 3000
Twin-rotor helicopter used to transport personnel and heavy cargo, including the Gate Engine and the GRO5V. It is not designed for high velocities (it tore to pieces when Shun warped it), and is unstable in strong winds (the Jumbo Jet Invader blew it away like a piece of paper).
Earth Defense License
An identification card that identifies an individual (man or animal) as an A.E.G.I.S. agent. The license has text that authorizes the bearer to perform tasks beyond the law and marks them as exempt from arrest and police interference.
Special Bokken Sword
Issued to Shun Ukiya, it contains a tiny Gate amplifier in its tip to supplement his kendo attacks with his Gate ability. It is retractable, thus it can be kept out of sight.
Citroen DS
An ordinary Citroen car issued to Shirei for official trips outside of A.E.G.I.S. Headquarters. It has an emergency pistol in its glove compartment. It was used when Shirei brought Shun to the secret A.E.G.I.S. headquarters for the first time; and when he and Keiko were chased by the monster #1 Hakosuka.
Lotus Seven
The car issued to Jim Skylark. Bears the license plate AEGIS 02.

== Media ==
=== Manga ===
A three-volume manga series, created by Keiji Goto and following the plot of the video game, was published by Kadokawa Shoten. Two volumes were released in the United States by Tokyopop.

No.	Original release date	Original ISBN	English release date	English ISBN
1	November 29, 1999	4-04-713308-6	March 11, 2003	978-1-59182-164-9
01. "Captain"; 02. "Lesson One"; 03. "The Shadow Gate"; 04. "Alone in the Library"; 05. "The Girl from Szechuan"; 06. "Shadow Boxing"; 07. "Command for Termination"
2	October 29, 2001	4-04-713464-3	May 6, 2003	978-1-59182-165-6
08. "Lost Kittens"; 09. "Snow White"; 10. "Snow White 2"; 11. "Alice"; 12. "The Princess And The Witch"; 13. "Darkness Returns"; 14. "The Third Giant"

=== Anime ===
The anime series was produced by GONZO, written by Hiroshi Yamaguchi, and was directed by Koichi Chigira. The network WOWOW aired the 24-episode series from April 3 to September 8, 2000. In 2001, Geneon Entertainment USA (then known as Pioneer) acquired the series and released them in eight volumes on DVD and VHS. In 2004, Geneon re-released the series under the Signature Series label. In 2007, Geneon USA was soon dissolved and left the series (including the GK21 OVA's) out-of print.

=== Songs ===
Opening theme

- "Asu no Egao no Tameni" (明日の笑顔のために; "For the Smile of Tomorrow")
  - Lyrics: Junichi Sato
  - Composition: Kohei Tanaka
  - Arrangement: Yasunori Iwasaki (岩崎 文紀, Iwasaki Yasunori)
  - Artist: Yumi Matsuzawa

Ending theme

- "Kyō Kara Asu E" (今日から明日へ; "From Today to Tomorrow")
  - Lyrics: Hiroshi Yamaguchi
  - Composition: Kohei Tanaka
  - Arrangement: Yasunori Iwasaki
  - Artist: Yumi Matsuzawa

=== Light Novel ===
Gate Keepers 1985 (ISBN 4-04-413105-8-C0193) tells the story of the 15 years leading up to Gate Keepers 21.

== See also ==
- Gate Keepers 21, the six episode OVA sequel.
