= Gate Keepers 21 =

Japanese OVA series

- Gate Keepers 21 DVD Cover in North America

ゲートキーパーズ21 (Gettokipazzu21)
- Genre: Drama, Science fiction
- Original video animation
- Directed by: Hiroshi Yamaguchi
- Written by: Hiroshi Yamahuchi
- Music by: Kohei Tanaka
- Studio: Gonzo
- Licensed by: NA: Geneon USA
- Released: April 24, 2002 – January 8, 2003
- Episodes: 6

Gate Keepers 21 (ゲートキーパーズ21, Gēto Kīpāzu Nijūichi) is a six-part sequel OVA series to the Gate Keepers animated TV series and has a darker and more serious plot than its predecessor. Some of the questions left unanswered in the TV series are answered in this sequel. Linking the two series are the characters Reiji Kageyama, Yukino Houjo, and the former Far Eastern AEGIS Headquarters setting, Tategami High School.

== Plot ==
Thirty one years have passed since the Far Eastern Branch of AEGIS and the Invaders waged war in Japan. Big businesses thrived until the eighties (when the Shōwa period ended with the death of Hirohito). The heyday of growth and prosperity have passed, the crime rate has increased, environmental problems have worsened, and the international situation has become increasingly unstable. The bright future that people hoped for is spiraling out of the reach of the common citizen. Coupled with the decline in the values and morals of the Japanese people comes the emergence of a new type of Invader. No longer an alien entity, the Invaders can now absorb ordinary humans into their ranks.

Officially disbanded and discredited, the few remaining remnants of AEGIS have formed a clandestine network of operatives to hunt down and destroy the Invaders. The premier agent of the AEGIS Network is the antisocial Ayane Isuzu who collects the crystal remains of Invader in exchange for money doled out by the mysterious Reiji Kageyama.

== Characters ==
Ayane Isuzu (五十鈴 綾音, Isuzu Ayane)
Voiced by: Ikue Ōtani (Japanese); Rebecca Forstadt (English)
An intelligent student, Ayane is ranked third-highest of her entire class at Tategami High School. Ayane's classmates consider her to be a geek and more than a little strange, not only because she is seldom seen without her computer, but also because of her introverted attitude and near-hostility to social situations. She has a strong resemblance to Saemi Ukiya but she has an attitude reminiscent of Megumi Kurogane. When Ayane battles Invaders, she prefers to use pre-programmed imitation Gates that are triggered by specially designed cellular phones. She often uses her computer to strategically time the deployment of the imitation Gates, and also uses various tracking programs to detect and home in on Invader activity. She is bitter about almost everything, as if she does not care about her surroundings, which is why she has few to no friends at all. Her past is revealed bit-by-bit in each episode, including her reason for avoiding any of the connections to her father. She and her mother were left to fend for themselves when her father, Shun Ukiya, dies battling Invaders. Because of this abandonment she resents using UP-15 and her inherited Gate of Wind. The only thing she treasures is a tiny bell, one of the few happy memories she has from her childhood, which she keeps on the lid of her laptop computer.
Miu Manazuru (真鶴 美羽, Manazuru Miu)
Voiced by: Yukiko Hanioka (Japanese); Kari Wahlgren (English)
Miu is a cheerful, clumsy and often clueless student in Ayane's class at Tategami High. She has few wants or desires apart from spending time with her friends, going on dates, and managing the school's soccer team. Miu's Gate power manifests itself when she attempts to escape from the excessive attentions of one of her dates—and that is when Ayane discovers her as well, and reluctantly recruits her to the AEGIS cause. After being recruited by Ayane, Miu starts to hang out with her which makes her friends wonder what made her hang out with such a weird person. When Miu is in Ayane's presence, she asks if she can do anything, but Ayane either ignores her or just tells her how worthless she is. Miu, upon being asked by Ayane what she is fighting for, answers that she wants to make everyone happy and is just curious. Her close friends, Chinami and Nao, even says that she does not get mad at all.
Yukino Hōjō (北条 雪乃, Hōjō Yukino)
Voiced by: Masami Suzuki (Japanese); Lia Sargent (English)
The ageless gatekeeper who talks in Tanka poetry and wears a kimono has taken up residence in Tategami High. Along with her pet ermine, Hisame, they have been the source for the rumors of ghosts that come out at night. Tragically while her body has not aged, her powers and strength are finally waning and long ago gave up appearing in front of her old friend Saemi Ukiya. Recognizing a similar sadness in the daughter of an old friend, she helps and befriends Ayane and Miu. She even consents to be given a new Sailor Fuku to wear. The reason for her agelessness is explained in episode 5. Gate Keepers usually have sad backgrounds because their gates absorb their happiness. Reiji Kageyama even mentions that gates that are used many times can destroy a gatekeeper. In Yukino's case, she was summoning her gate constantly in times of emergency so her time was frozen because of overuse.
Nazo/Reiji Kageyama (影山 零士, Kageyama Reiji)
Voiced by: Tomokazu Seki (Japanese); Kirk Thornton (English)
A mysterious man who is often seen driving a slick blue TVR Tuscan. He gives commands to Ayane Isuzu on attacking Invaders. He pays Ayane in exchange for the Invader crystals that she collects. These human-based crystals do not disintegrate as they did in the original series. Apparently, he is an AEGIS Network authority, possibly similar to Shirei who was the commander of AEGIS Far East branch. After the events in Gate Keepers, he is able to wield both versions of his gate in combat and also as a means to gain funding through Stock Market trades. While extremely effective in combat (he easily destroys a battalion of Invader soldiers) the use of his Gate severely weakens him. Like Yukino, his excessive use of the Gate has started to affect him. In his case, instead of his time being frozen, his Gate is slowly eating his body. Some of his body parts are already artificial such as an arm and some internal organs. In episode 5, his left arm is cut off by Yuurei Shōjo (Ghost Girl) but it does not bother him because it was prosthetic. In episode 6, he warns Satoka of this problem as his own left arm is consumed by overusing his Gate Keeper powers.
Satoka Tachikawa (太刀川 里香, Tachikawa Satoka)
Voiced by: Sakura Nogawa (Japanese); Lia Sargent (English)
Tachikawa's first appearance is in the third episode, where she rescues Miu and her friends when the Invaders attack a Karaoke Bar. Her combat tactics generally revolve around frontal assaults using her gate to materialize a variety of swords and knives. Summoned to the region by Reiji Kageyama, she arrives as reinforcements for the Top-Ranked hunter, Ayane Isuzu. Unlike Ayane, she does her job with zeal and seems to relish making money from her ventures. The differences in their personalities also fuels the one sided rivalry that she has with Ayane. Ayane is shown to generally ignore her and walks away even during the middle of conversations. This dismissive attitude only serves to frustrate Satoka even more.

=== Light Novel ===
Gate Keepers 1985 (ISBN 4-04-413105-8-C0193) tells the story of the 15 years leading up to Gate Keepers 21.

== Episodes ==
The OVAs were periodically released from April 24, 2002, to January 8, 2003. Geneon USA licensed the series and were released on DVD. North American cable network TechTV aired the series in July 2003. In 2007, Geneon USA was dissolved which left the series (and the main Gate Keepers TV series) out of print.

No.	Title	Original release date	English air date
1	"Encounter"; Transliteration: "Deai" (Japanese: 出会い)	April 24, 2002	2003-07-17
Ayane Isuzu destroys some Invaders, and collects the crystals they leave behind. While looking for more Invaders, she sees a girl fly across the sky. After school the next day, Ayane meets with a mysterious man who tells her to locate a girl called Miu Manazuru, for she is a Gate Keeper. Ayane gives the man a bag of crystals in exchange for money. That night, Ayane approaches Miu, and tells Miu to join her in her effort to destroy the Invaders. Miu is wondering what to do, when they are suddenly surrounded by Invaders...
2	"Mad Dash"; Transliteration: "Maddo Dasshu" (Japanese: マッドダッシュ)	July 17, 2002	2003-07-18
Ayane and Miu are chasing after a truck under control of the Invaders. Ayane manages to throw off the police that were following, and then tells Miu to fly over to the truck. Miu almost succeeds, but hits a highway sign instead. The next day, Miu and Ayane are at their school, when they see what appears to be a ghost. They decide to follow it, and in the process stumble upon an elevator that takes them to an underground complex. Down there they discover something that can help them find the Invaders.
3	"Late Summer"; Transliteration: "Banka" (Japanese: 晩夏)	August 21, 2002	2003-07-22
Miu's school friends notice that Miu seems distant depressed. Miu's friends decide to take her to a karaoke lounge to try to cheer her up. They are in a singing room when an interruption occurs in the form of a power outage. Suddenly, Invaders start swarming all over the place. Ayane hears about the Invaders at the karaoke lounge, and goes to help.
4	"Ayane"; Transliteration: "Ayane" (Japanese: やめ)	September 19, 2002	2003-07-23
A new Gate Keeper, Satoka Tachikawa, has appeared. She destroys Invaders to collect their crystal remnants for money. Ayane and Miu are outside of school when Satoka confronts them. She attempts to get Ayane to answer a question about her past, but Ayane manages to slip away. Later, Reiji notices signs of Invader activity, and Satoka rushes off to fight them.
5	"Miu"; Transliteration: "Miu" (Japanese: 美羽)	October 17, 2002	2003-07-24
Miu's decides to visit Reiji at his headquarters, where they talk more about the Invaders, and Ayame.
6	"The Sound of Wings"; Transliteration: "Hane no oto" (Japanese: 羽の音)	January 8, 2003	2003-07-25
The Gatekeepers face their final confrontation against the Invaders.

== Reception ==
Reception to Gate Keepers 21 has been mixed. Mike Toole of Anime Jump praised the show, showing "Japan's current cultural zeitgeist, where otaku rarely leave their perches on message boards and mobile phone networks, and apathy and self-centeredness are slowly breeding a newer, scarier "me" generation. This raises the question: are the "invaders" an insidious hidden enemy, as some characters believe, or simply the manifestation of abhorrent human behavior?"

Anime News Network criticized the show's theme, saying that the humor from the original Gate Keepers may have given it a good name and its dark theme just "isn't very entertaining". Helen McCarthy in 500 Essential Anime Movies commented that the anime "has a fascinating idea at its roots - the aliens feed on human selfishness."
