= Giant Robo =

Japanese manga series

- Giant Robo manga cover art

ジャイアントロボ (Jaianto Robo)
- Manga
- Written by: Mitsuteru Yokoyama
- Published by: Shogakukan
- Magazine: Weekly Shōnen Sunday
- Original run: May 1967 – February 1972
- Volumes: 3
- Anime television series

GR: Giant Robo
- Directed by: Ren Usami (chief); Masahiko Murata
- Produced by: Hitoshi Hayakawa
- Written by: Chiaki J. Konaka
- Music by: Shinya Kimura (Kimushin)
- Studio: A.C.G.T
- Licensed by: Softgarage
- Original network: SKY Perfect
- Original run: January 19, 2007 – July 6, 2007
- Episodes: 13
- Manga

GR: Giant Robo
- Written by: Ryoumachi Shiro
- Published by: Wani Books
- Magazine: Comic Gum
- Original run: 2007 – 2008
- Volumes: 1
- Related works
- Giant Robo, (1967, tokusatsu series); Giant Robo: The Day the Earth Stood Still (1992, OVA series)
- icon

Giant Robo (ジャイアントロボ, Jaianto Robo) is a Japanese manga series by Mitsuteru Yokoyama. The manga, which was first published in 1967, spawned a live-action tokusatsu television series of the same name, as well as a series of original video animations called Giant Robo: The Day the Earth Stood Still.

== Concept and plot ==
The project was launched on the premise with a tv-adaptation. Yoshinori Watanabe from Toei Company proposed a concept "to admix Daimajin (by Daiei Film) and Ultraman (by Tsuburaya Productions)", and Yokoyama, the author of Tetsujin 28-go, accepted an offer for a new manga series. The three-part manga was serialized in the Weekly Shōnen Sunday from May 1967 to March 1968.

=== Part 1 ===
The secret society "Big Fire", scheming to conquer Earth, is furthering Project GR. The special investigation organization of the United Nations dispatches an agent in Country T to interfere with the plan. Daisaku Kusama, a Japanese tourist, is mistaken for the agent and is abducted by "BF".

=== Part 2 ===
Daisaku Kusama comes back barely alive to Japan with Secret Agent Azuma with GR1. However, "BF" plans an attempt on Daisaku's life to recapture GR1 and they let GR2 and GR3 attack Tokyo.

=== Part 3 ===
A bomber carrying a hydrogen bomb crashes into Japanese waters. The hydrogen bomb has already been recovered by "BF" though the bomber is recovered at once. "BF" demands that GR1 should be exchanged for the hydrogen bomb.

== Characters ==
- Daisaku Kusama (草間大作, Kusama Daisaku): A moral teenage Japanese boy who was traveling to T Nation in order to study. Being an Olympic Sharpshooter, he is proficient at wielding firearms. He is calm and collected during battles and often quickly thinks of methods to save the day.
- Azuma (あずま, Azuma): The chairman of the Japanese branch of the special investigation organization of the United Nations. He is dedicated to stopping Big Fire's machinations and serves as Daisaku's mentor.

== Mecha ==
- GR-1: The former Big Fire robot that Daisaku controls, GR-1 is the only thing standing in the way of Big Fire's world domination plan. Built primarily for land combat but overhauled to have flight and naval capabilities in volume 2, GR-1 is powered by a nuclear engine located in the abdomen section and is armed with a missile launcher hidden in its head, a laser beam emitted from its eyes, and a heat ray cannon located on its belt buckle. It is also equipped with a minesweeper on its feet. In GR: Giant Robo, GR-1 is able to manipulate gravity using the bolts on its ankles and wrists, which allows it to briefly move at blinding speeds and punch with more force. This power is increased to allow levitation when it is combined with GR-8 "Dakolar." This also grants it the ability to fire its forearms attached to GR-8's tentacles. GR-1 is at times hinted to be self-aware and will act on its own will to protect Daisaku.
- GR-2: Big Fire's naval combat robot, GR-2 is armed with a rocket punch attack, a missile salvo and can escape from danger with an underwater vortex engine. In GR: Giant Robo, GR-2's rocket punch attack can be steered in midair by an operator with psychokinetic abilities and its mouthplate hides a powerful beam weapon.
- GR-3: Big Fire's aerial combat robot, it is equipped with rocket launchers in its fingers, a retractable spike in its head and a flamethrower in its chest. GR: Giant Robo replaces the rocket launchers with laser weapons.
- Dakolar: A giant UFO mecha that appears in the first volume, Dakolar bears retractable tentacles to grab and capture items. A version of this mecha is designated GR-8 in GR: Giant Robo and is able to combine with GR-1, increasing its abilities.
- Flying Stingrays: Giant stingray-shaped robots that emerge from the submarine base of the BF team to interfere with the UN's search for a downed hydrogen bomb carrier in the second volume.
- GR-4 "Disaster": Appearing only in GR: Giant Robo, GR-4, nicknamed "Disaster," is a GR discovered in the United States following an underground nuclear weapons test, which heavily damaged it. GR-4 looks nearly identical to GR-1 aside from an all-black color scheme and possesses the same gravity manipulation functions. GR-4 is a reference to Calamity, an enemy from the tokusatsu series that was also a monochrome copy of Giant Robo.
- GR-5: Appearing only in GR: Giant Robo, GR-5 is a husky, mustard colored robot with a retractable horn. It is used to fight GR-4 in a battle that lead to both machines being destroyed.
- GR-6: Appearing only in GR: Giant Robo, GR-6 was stored in a base alongside GR-5 before it was destroyed with the base during GR-4 and GR-5's duel.
- GR-7: Appearing only in GR: Giant Robo, GR-7 was found in an ancient ruin in China but was destroyed during excavation attempts. Its design is a reference to the mecha Titan from Mitsuteru Yokoyama's 1976 manga Mars
- GR-0: Appearing only in GR: Giant Robo, GR-0 is a large head shaped machine capable of destroying all life on Earth should 7 out of the 8 GR units be destroyed. Its head design and ability to self destruct out of self preservation is a reference to the mecha Gaia from Mitsuteru Yokoyama's 1976 manga Mars

== Adaptations ==
Adaptations include:

- Giant Robo (TV series), a 1967–1968 live-action tokusatsu TV series based on the manga. Released in the U.S. as Johnny Sokko and His Flying Robot, Stock footage from the U.S. dub of the series was condensed into a TV movie titled Voyage Into Space (1970).
- Giant Robo: The Day the Earth Stood Still, a 1990s direct-to-video series reimagining of the manga.
  - Giant Robo: The Day the Earth Burned, a 2006 spin-off manga series from the creator of Giant Robo: The Day the Earth Stood Still.

=== GR: Giant Robo ===
GR: Giant Robo (GR ジャイアントロボ, GR: Jaianto Robo) is an anime TV series written by Chiaki Konaka (Serial Experiments Lain, The Big O) and directed by Masahiko Murata (Jinki:EXTEND, Mazinkaiser) and produced by SoftGarage. The TV series is a re-imagining of Mitsuteru Yokoyama's manga and was created to commemorate Giant Robo's 40th anniversary.

GR: Giant Robo premiered on January 19, 2007. The TV series finished its run on July 6 of the same year, totaling 13 episodes, with the possibility for two further seasons.

The story takes place at the dawn of the 21st century, when a terrorist organization known as Gigantic Rebellion Operators (GRO) utilizes giant robots built by an ancient civilization known as "GRs" to cause fear and destruction around the world. Meanwhile, the United Nations paramilitary organization UNISOM attempts to discover and secure hidden ruins containing GRs before GRO can obtain them. The independent 24/7 news organization known as Broadcasting Frontline Network (BFN) reports on the conflict between GRO and UNISOM, always seeming to have more information than they should. One day, 18-year-old scuba diving guide Daisaku Kusama encounters a GR, designated GR-1, in a ruin in Okinawa. Beckoned by forces that he cannot understand, Daisaku is made to bond, body and spirit, with the ancient weapon and fight against GRO, discovering the truth behind the conflict and the nature and purpose of the GRs along the way.

A pilot for the TV series was made in 2005, which was a selection of scenes from the 1967 manga in animated form. Due to a change in staff at SoftGarage, the idea of a faithful adaptation of Giant Robo was scrapped in favor of a modern worldview. The show also has elements of the Cthulhu Mythos in it, with the Giant Robos originally being ancient machines built to fight off eldritch beings known only as "The Old Ones" that threatened the sanctity of the human race.

=== Reception ===
The Encyclopedia of Science Fiction described the 2007 anime GR: Giant Robo as an ambitious but flawed series, criticizing its confused storytelling, slow pacing and frequently dull execution. Although acknowledging its attempts to engage with broader intellectual and political ideas, including a reference to Noam Chomsky, the encyclopedia found that these ambitions did not translate into a particularly compelling narrative. It also criticized the giant robot battles as unremarkable, although it noted that such confrontations were not the series' primary focus. Overall, it considered the production far from entirely unsuccessful but substantially weakened by its narrative shortcomings.
