= The Big O =

1999 Japanese anime television series

- Cover art for The Big O Complete Collection North American DVD release by Bandai Entertainment featuring Norman (left), Roger (middle), and Dorothy (right)

THE ビッグオー (Za Biggu Ō)
- Genre: Mecha; Neo-noir; Tech-noir
- Created by: Hajime Yatate
- Manga
- Written by: Hitoshi Ariga
- Published by: Kodansha
- English publisher: NA: Viz Media
- Magazine: Monthly Magazine Z
- Original run: July 1999 – October 2001
- Volumes: 6
- Anime television series
- Directed by: Kazuyoshi Katayama
- Produced by: Eiji Sashida; Chieo Ohashi; Atsushi Sugita (Bandai Visual)
- Written by: Chiaki J. Konaka; Kazuyoshi Katayama
- Music by: Toshihiko Sahashi
- Studio: Sunrise
- Licensed by: AUS: Madman Entertainment; NA: Sentai Filmworks (expired); Discotek Media; UK: Beez Entertainment
- Original network: Wowow
- English network: US: Cartoon Network (Toonami), Adult Swim
- Original run: October 13, 1999 – January 19, 2000
- Episodes: 13
- Anime television series

The Big O II
- Directed by: Kazuyoshi Katayama
- Produced by: Atsushi Sugita (Bandai Visual); Kenji Uchida; Chieo Ohashi
- Written by: Chiaki J. Konaka; Kazuyoshi Katayama
- Music by: Toshihiko Sahashi
- Studio: Sunrise
- Licensed by: AUS: Madman Entertainment; NA: Sentai Filmworks (expired); Discotek Media
- Original network: SUN, MX-TV, CTC, TVS, TVK, TVA, Wowow
- English network: US: Adult Swim (Toonami)
- Original run: January 2, 2003 – March 23, 2003
- Episodes: 13
- Manga

The Big O: Lost Memory
- Written by: Hajime Yatate
- Illustrated by: Hitoshi Ariga
- Published by: Kodansha
- Magazine: Magazine Z
- Original run: November 2002 – September 2003
- Volumes: 2
- icon

The Big O (Japanese: THE ビッグオー, Hepburn: Za Biggu Ō) is a Japanese mecha-anime television series created and produced by Sunrise. The writing staff was assembled by the series' head writer, Chiaki J. Konaka, who is known for his work on Serial Experiments Lain and Hellsing. The story takes place forty years after a mysterious occurrence causes the residents of Paradigm City to lose their memories. The series follows Roger Smith, Paradigm City's top Negotiator. He provides this "much needed service" with the help of a robot named R. Dorothy Wayneright and his butler Norman Burg. When the need arises, Roger calls upon Big O, a giant relic from the city's past.

The television series was designed as a tribute to Japanese and Western shows from the 1960s and 1970s. The series is presented in the style of film noir and combines themes of detective fiction and mecha anime. The setpieces are reminiscent of tokusatsu productions of the 1950s and 1960s, particularly Toho's kaiju movies, and the score is an eclectic mix of styles and musical homages.

The Big O aired on Wowow satellite television from October 13, 1999, and January 19, 2000. The English-language version aired on Cartoon Network's Toonami from April 2 to 23, 2001. Originally planned as a 26-episode series, low viewership in Japan reduced production to the first 13. Positive international reception resulted in a second season consisting of the remaining 13 episodes, co-produced by Cartoon Network, Sunrise, and Bandai Visual. Season two premiered on Japan's Sun Television on January 2, 2003, and the American premiere took place seven months later. Following the closure of Bandai Entertainment by parent company Bandai (owned by Bandai Namco Holdings) in 2012, Sunrise announced at Otakon 2013 that Sentai Filmworks acquired both seasons of The Big O. In August 2026, it was announced that Discotek Media had acquired the license to The Big O and will release it on Blu-ray.

== Synopsis ==
=== Setting ===
An aerial shot of Paradigm City. The city is based on the island of Manhattan and is suggested to be New York City itself.

The Big O is set in the fictional city-state of Paradigm City (Note: パラダイム・シティ, Paradaimu Shiti). The city is located on a seacoast and is surrounded by a vast desert wasteland. The partially domed city is wholly controlled by a monopolistic megacorporation called Paradigm Corporation, resulting in a corporate police state. Paradigm is known as "The City of Amnesia" (Note: 記憶喪失の街, Kioku soushitsu no Machi) because forty years prior to the story, "The Event" (Note: 何か, Nani ka; lit. 'Something') destroyed the world outside the city and left the survivors without any prior memories. The city is characterized by severe class inequality: the higher-income population resides inside the more pleasant domes, with the remainder left in tenements outside. Residents of the city believe that they are the last survivors of the world and no other nations exist outside the city. Androids and giant robots known as "Megadeus" coexist with the residents of Paradigm City and residents do not find them unusual.

=== Plot ===
After failing to negotiate with terrorists at the cost of his client's life, Roger Smith is obligated to care for Dorothy Wayneright, a young female android. Over the course of the series, Roger Smith continues to accept negotiation work from the residents of Paradigm City, he often leads to uncovering the nature and mystery of Paradigm City and encountering megadeus or other giant enemies that require Big O. Supporting characters are Angel, a mysterious woman in search of memories; Dan Dastun, chief of the military police of Paradigm city and old friend of Roger Smith; and Norman Burg, the butler of Roger Smith and mechanic of Big O.

The main antagonist is Alex Rosewater, the chairman of Paradigm City whose goal is to revive the megadeus "Big Fau" in attempts to become the god of Paradigm City. Other recurring antagonists are Jason Beck, criminal and con-artist attempting to humiliate Roger Smith; Schwarzwald, an ex-reporter obsessed with finding the truth of Paradigm City and also pilot of the megadeus "Big Duo"; Vera Ronstadt, leader of a group of foreigners known as the Union searching for memories and revenge against Paradigm City; and Alan Gabriel, a cyborg assassin working for Alex Rosewater and the Union.

The series ends with the awakening of a new megadeus, and the revelation that the world is a simulated reality. A climactic battle ensues between Big O and Big Fau, after which reality is systematically erased by the new megadeus, an incarnation of Angel, recognized as "Big Venus" by Dorothy. Roger implores Angel to "let go of the past" regardless of its existential reality, and focus only on the present and the future. In an isolated control room, the real Angel observes Roger and her past encounters with him on a series of television monitors. On the control panel lies Metropolis, a book featured prominently since the thirteenth episode; the cover features an illustration of angel wings and gives the author's name as "Angel Rosewater". Big Venus and Big O physically merge, causing the virtual reality to reset. The final scene shows Roger Smith driving down a restored Paradigm city with Dorothy and Angel observing him from the side of the road.

=== Planned continuation ===
Sato, Katayama, Konaka, and Bandai in general received many inquiries from fans in Japan asking for further clarification on the plot and ending. The three directly addressed these questions via an art book and companion to the series in 2004. Katayama describes Paradigm City as the created narrative of Angel, who (alongside Roger Smith only) stands above the story but writes herself a role to play. The narrative provided for civilization to continue in some form, though Angel included a safeguard that would reset the narrative should her identity as the creator ever be discovered by the characters. Having fallen in love with the character of Roger Smith, she inserts herself into the story with conditions designed to bring them together whenever Roger encounters a particularly tough challenge or is investigating mysteries. According to Katayama, her planned narrative collapses when she becomes jealous of Roger's affinity for R. Dorothy, culminating in Gordon Rosewater's realization that Angel is indeed the creator of Paradigm City. Angel prepares to end the narrative world via piloting Big Venus, which Konaka states will return everything to its destroyed, ruined state it lay in immediately after the cataclysm 40 years ago. Roger however successfully negotiates for her to simply restart the narrative and allow Paradigm City to be reset and continue in some form. Konaka originally wrote the ending to clearly show that Angel changed her role to become Roger's assistant, repeating a scene in the first episode where Roger negotiates for the release of Dorothy Waynewright, who is implied to now be human; Katayama changed this to make the ending more ambiguous. In both endings, Paradigm City continues as a city of amnesiacs, despite Gordon Rosewater's wishes for Roger to negotiate with the creator to return people's memories to them.

== Production and release ==
Development of the retro-styled series began in 1996. Keiichi Sato came up with the concept of The Big O: a giant city-smashing robot, piloted by a man in black, in a Gotham-like environment. He later met up with Kazuyoshi Katayama, who had just finished directing Those Who Hunt Elves, and started work on the layouts and character designs. But when things "were about to really start moving," production on Katayama's Sentimental Journey began, putting plans on hold. Meanwhile, Sato was heavily involved with his work on City Hunter. The initial story idea revolved around a cataclysm (caused by a meteorite impact) that destroyed most of human civilization. The setting would be a city that survived, where the protagonist pilots a giant robot engineered from the meteorite's recovered superalloy to battle against the authority in charge of the surviving city.

Sato admits it all started as "a gimmick for a toy" but the representatives at Bandai Hobby Division did not see the same potential. From there on, the dealings would be with Bandai Visual, but Sunrise still needed some safeguards and requested more robots be designed to increase prospective toy sales. In 1999, with the designs complete, Chiaki J. Konaka was brought on as head writer. Among other things, Konaka came up with the idea of "a town without memory" and his writing staff put together the outline for a 26-episodes series. Konaka deliberately chose to present the setting, Paradigm City, as a city of amnesiacs to avoid needing to develop lore for the origin of the show's mecha. When Cartoon Network later offered funding for the second season, its representatives requested that the story be satisfactorily finished at the end of this season; this prompted Konaka to continue developing the concept of the amnesiac city as its central theme.

The Big O premiered on October 13, 1999, on Wowow. When the production staff was informed the series would be shortened to 13 episodes, the writers decided to end it with a cliffhanger, hoping the next 13 episodes would be picked up. In April 2001, The Big O premiered on Cartoon Network's Toonami lineup.

The series garnered positive fan response internationally that resulted in a second season co-produced by Cartoon Network and Sunrise. Season two premiered on Japan's Sun Television in January 2003, with the American premiere taking place seven months later as an Adult Swim exclusive. The second season would not be seen on Toonami until July 27, 2013, 10 years after it began airing on Adult Swim.

The second season was scripted by Chiaki Konaka with input from the American producers. Cartoon Network raised two requests for the second season: more action and reveal the mystery in the first season, although Kazuyoshi Katayama admitted that he did not intend to reveal it, just to make an anthology of adventures set in the universe. Along with the 13 episodes of season two, Cartoon Network had an option for 26 additional episodes to be written by Konaka, but according to Jason DeMarco, executive producer for season two, the middling ratings and DVD sales in the United States and Japan made any further episodes impossible to be produced.

Following the closure of Bandai Entertainment by parent company in 2012, Sunrise announced at Otakon 2013 that Sentai Filmworks rescued both seasons of The Big O. On June 20, 2017, Sentai Filmworks released both seasons on Blu-ray. In August 2026, Discotek Media announced that it would release both seasons on a Blu-ray set in October of the same year, in Japanese with English subtitles and with an English dub, and the second season will include the 5.1 audio mix of the English dub.

=== Music ===
The Big O was scored by Geidai alumnus Toshihiko Sahashi. His composition is richly symphonic and classical, with a number of pieces delving into electronica and jazz. Chosen because of his "frightening amount of musical knowledge about TV dramas overseas," Sahashi integrates musical homages into the soundtrack. The background music draws from film noir, spy films and sci-fi television series like The Twilight Zone. The battle themes are reminiscent of Akira Ifukube's compositions for the Godzilla series.

The first opening theme is the Queen-influenced "Big-O!". Composed, arranged and performed by Rui Nagai, the song resembles the theme to the Flash Gordon film. The second opening theme is "Respect," composed by Sahashi. The track is an homage to the music of UFO, composed by Barry Gray. In 2007, Rui Nagai composed "Big-O! Show Must Go On," a 1960s hard rock piece, for Animax's reruns of the show; this composition replaced the original opening themes for the Blu-Ray release of the series. The closing theme is the slow love ballad "And Forever..." written by Chie and composed by Ken Shima. The duet is performed by Robbie Danzie and Naoki Takao.

Along with Sahashi's original compositions, the soundtrack features Chopin's Prelude No. 15 and a jazz saxophone rendition of "Jingle Bells." The complete score was released in two volumes by Victor Entertainment.

== Design ==
The Big O is the brainchild of Keiichi Sato and Kazuyoshi Katayama, an homage to the shows they grew up with. The show references the works of tokusatsu produced by the Toei Company and Tsuburaya Productions, as well as shows such as Super Robot Red Baron and Super Robot Mach Baron and "old school" super robot anime. The series is done in the style of film noir and pulp fiction and combines the feel of a detective show with the giant robot genre.

=== Style ===
The shadows of Venetian blinds cast upon the protagonist, a signature visual of film noir.

The Big O shares many of its themes, diction, archetypes and visual iconography with film noirs of the 1940s like The Big Sleep (1946). The series incorporates the use of long dark shadows in the tradition of chiaroscuro and tenebrism. Film noir is also known for its use of odd angles, such as Roger's low shot introduction in the first episode. Noir cinematographers favoured this angle because it made characters almost rise from the ground, giving them dramatic girth and symbolic overtones. Other disorientating devices like dutch angles, mirror reflection and distorting shots are employed throughout the series.

The characters of The Big O fit the noir and pulp fiction archetypes. Roger Smith is a protagonist in the mold of Chandler's Philip Marlowe or Hammett's Sam Spade. He is canny and cynical, a disillusioned cop-turned-negotiator whose job has more in common with detective-style work than negotiating. Big Ear is Roger's street informant and Dan Dastun is the friend on the police force. The recurring Beck is the imaginative thug compelled by delusions of grandeur while Angel fills the role of the femme fatale. Minor characters include crooked cops, corrupt business men and deranged scientists.

The dialogue in the series is recognized for its witty, wry sense of humor. The characters come off as charming and exchange banter not often heard in anime series, as the dialogue has the tendency to be straightforward. The plot is moved along by Roger's voice-over narration, a device used in film noir to place the viewer in the mind of the protagonist so it can intimately experience the character's angst and partly identify with the narrator.

The tall buildings and giant domes create a sense of claustrophobia and paranoia characteristic of the style. The rural landscape, Ailesberry Farm, contrasts Paradigm City. Noir protagonists often look for sanctuary in such settings but they just as likely end up becoming a killing ground. The series score is representative of its setting. While no classic noir possesses a jazz score, the music could be heard in nightclubs within the films. Roger's recurring theme, a lone saxophone accompaniment to the protagonist's narration, best exemplifies the noir stylings of the series.

Amnesia is a common plot device in film noir. Because most of these stories focused on a character proving his innocence, authors up the ante by making him an amnesiac, unable to prove his innocence even to himself.

The series style has also been classified as dieselpunk.

=== Influences ===
Before The Big O, Sunrise was a subcontractor for Warner Bros. Animation's Batman: The Animated Series, one of the series' influences. Cartoon Network, under the Toonami flag advertised the series as "One part Bond. One part Bruce Wayne. One part City Smashing Robot."

Roger Smith is a pastiche of the Bruce Wayne persona and the Batman. The character design resembles Wayne, complete with slicked-back hair and double-breasted business suit. Like Bruce, Roger prides himself in being a rich playboy to the extent that one of his household's rules is only women may be let into his mansion without his permission. Like Batman, Roger Smith carries a no-gun policy, albeit more flexible. Unlike the personal motives of the Batman, Roger enforces this rule for "it's all part of being a gentleman." Among Roger's gadgetry is the Griffon, a large, black hi-tech sedan comparable to the Batmobile, a grappling cable that shoots out his wristwatch and the giant robot that Angel calls "Roger's alter ego."

The Big O's cast of supporting characters includes Norman, Roger's faithful mechanically inclined butler who fills the role of Alfred Pennyworth; R. Dorothy Wayneright, who plays the role of the sidekick; and Dan Dastun, a good honest cop who, like Jim Gordon, is both a friend to the hero and greatly respected by his comrades.

The other major influence is Mitsuteru Yokoyama's Giant Robo. Before working on The Big O, Kazuyoshi Katayama and other animators worked with Yasuhiro Imagawa on Giant Robo: The Day the Earth Stood Still. The feature, a "retro chic" homage to Yokoyama's career, took seven years to produce and suffered low sales and high running costs. Frustrated by the experience, Katayama and his staff put all their efforts into making "good" with The Big O.

Like Giant Robo, the megadeuses of Big O are metal behemoths. The designs are strange and "more macho than practical," sporting big stovepipe arms and exposed rivets. Unlike the giants of other mecha series, the megadeuses do not exhibit ninja-like speed nor grace. Instead, the robots are armed with "old school" weaponry such as missiles, piston powered punches, machine guns and laser cannons.

Katayama also cited Super Robot Red Baron and Super Robot Mach Baron among influences on the inspiration of The Big O. Believing that because Red Baron had such a low budget and the big fights always happened outside of a city setting, he wanted Big O to be the show he felt Red Baron could be with a bigger budget. He also spoke of how he first came up with designs for the robots first as if they were making designs to appeal to toy companies, rather than how Gundam was created with a toy company wanting an anime to represent their new product. Big O's large pumping piston "Sudden Impact" arms, for example, he felt would be cool gimmicks in a toy.

== Related media ==
=== Publications ===
The Big O was conceived as a media franchise. To this effect, Sunrise requested a manga be produced along with the animated series. The Big O manga started serialization in Kodansha's Magazine Z in July 1999, three months before the anime premiere. Authored by Hitoshi Ariga, the manga uses Keiichi Sato's concept designs in an all-new story. The series ended in October 2001. The issues were later collected in six volumes. The English version of the manga is published by Viz Media.

In anticipation of the broadcast of the second season, a new manga series was published. Lost Memory (Note: ロストメモリー, Rosuto Memorī), authored by Hitoshi Ariga. Lost Memory takes place between volumes five and six of the original manga. The issues were serialized in Magazine Z from November 2002 to September 2003 and were collected in two volumes. Paradigm Noise (Note: パラダイム・ノイズ, Paradaimu Noizu), a novel by Yuki Taniguchi, was released 16 July 2003 by Tokuma Shoten.

The Big O Visual: The official companion to the TV series (ISBN 4-575-29579-5) was published by Futabasha in 2003. The book contains full-color artwork, character bios and concept art, mecha sketches, video/LD/DVD jacket illustrations, history on the making of The Big O, staff interviews, "Roger's Monologues" comic strip and the original script for the final episode of the series.

=== Audio drama ===
"Walking Together On The Yellow Brick Road" was released by Victor Entertainment on 21 September 2000. The drama CD was written by series head writer Chiaki J. Konaka and featured the series' voice cast. An English translation, written by English dub translator David Fleming, was posted on Konaka's website.

=== Video games ===
The first season of Big O is featured in Super Robot Wars D for the Game Boy Advance in 2003. The series, including its second season, is also featured in Super Robot Wars Z, released in 2008. The Big O became a mainstay of the "Z" games, appearing in each entry of the subseries.

=== Toys and model kits ===
Bandai released a non-scale model kit of Big O in 2000. Though it was an easy snap-together kit, it required painting, as all of the parts (except the clear orange crown and canopy) were molded in dark gray. The kit included springs that enabled the slide-action Side Piles on the forearms to simulate Big O's Sudden Impact maneuver. Also included was an unpainted Roger Smith figure.

PVC figures of Big O and Big Duo (Schwarzwald's Megadeus) were sold by Bandai America. Each came with non-poseable figures of Roger, Dorothy and Angel. Mini-figure sets were sold in Japan and America during the run of the second season. The characters included Big O (standard and attack modes), Roger, Dorothy & Norman, Griffon (Roger's car), Dorothy-1 (Big O's first opponent), Schwarzwald and Big Duo.

In 2009, Bandai released a plastic/diecast figure of the Big O under their Soul of Chogokin line. The figure has the same features as the model kit, but with added detail and accessories. Its design was closely supervised by original designer Keiichi Sato.

In 2011, Max Factory released action figures of Roger and Dorothy through their Figma toyline. Like most Figmas, they are very detailed, articulated and come with accessories and interchangeable faces. In the same year, Max Factory also released a 12-inch, diecast figure of Big O under their Max Gokin line. The figure contained most of the accessories as the Soul of Chogokin figure but also included some others that could be bought separately from the SOC figure, such as the Mobydick (hip) Anchors and Roger Smith's car: the Griffon. Like the Soul of Chogokin figure, its design was also supervised by Keiichi Sato. As well, in that same year, Max Factory released soft vinyl figures of Big Duo and Big Fau, in-scale with the Max Gokin Big O. These figures are high in detail but limited in articulation, such as the arms and legs being the only things to move. To date, this is the only action figure of Big Fau.

== Reception ==
The Big O premiered on October 13, 1999. During pre-production, the show was cut from its original 26-episode run to a 13-episode run. The series generally received high praise in Japan, but it was not enough to warrant producing a sequel. When the series debuted to audiences in the United States in 2000, it also received a highly positive response in part supported by coverage on Michael Toole's Anime Jump blog. According to Konaka, the combined effort of Japanese and American audiences requesting a sequel made it possible for a second season to be greenlit. In an interview with AnimePlay, Keiichi Sato said "This is exactly as we had planned", referring to the success overseas.

Several words appear constantly in the English-language reviews; adjectives like "hip", "sleek," "stylish", "classy", and, above all, "cool" serve to describe the artwork, the concept, and the series itself. Reviewers have pointed out references and homages to various works of fiction, namely Batman, Giant Robo, the works of Isaac Asimov, Fritz Lang's Metropolis, James Bond, and Cowboy Bebop. But "while saying that may cause one to think the show is completely derivative", reads an article at Anime on DVD, "The Big O still manages to stand out as something original amongst the other numerous cookie-cutter anime shows." One reviewer cites the extensive homages as one of the series problems and calls to unoriginality on the creators' part.

The first season's reception was positive. Anime on DVD recommends it as an essential series. Chris Beveridge of the aforementioned site gave an A− to Vols. 1 and 2, and a B+ to Vols. 3 and 4. Mike Toole of Anime Jump gave it 4.5 (out of a possible 5) stars, while the review at the Anime Academy gave it a grade of 83, listing the series' high points as being "unique", the characters "interesting," and the action "nice." Reviewers, and fans alike, agree the season's downfall was the ending, or its lack thereof. The dangling plot threads frustrated the viewers and prompted Cartoon Network's involvement in the production of further episodes.

The look and feel of the show received a big enhancement in the second season. This time around, the animation is "near OVA quality" and the artwork "far more lush and detailed." Also enhanced are the troubles of the first season. The giant robot battles still seem out of place to some, while others praise the "over-the-top-ness" of their execution.

For some reviewers, the second season "doesn't quite match the first" addressing to "something" missing in these episodes. Andy Patrizio of IGN points out changes in Roger Smith's character, who "lost some of his cool and his very funny side in the second season." Like a repeat of season one, this season's ending is considered its downfall. Chris Beveridge of Anime on DVD wonders if this was head writer "Konaka's attempt to throw his hat into the ring for creating one of the most confusing and oblique endings of any series." Patrizio states "the creators watched The Truman Show and The Matrix a few times too many."

The series continues to have a strong cult following into the 2010s. In 2014 BuzzFeed writer Ryan Broderick ranked The Big O as one of the best anime series to binge-watch. Dan Casey host of The Nerdist's Dan Cave stated The Big O was the anime series he was most eager to see rebooted or remade, along with Trigun and Soul Eater. In 2017, Ollie Barder of Forbes wrote, "From the classic and retro styled mecha design of Keiichi Sato to the overall film noir visual tone of the series, The Big O was a fascinating and visually very different kind of show. It also had a fantastic voice cast, with probably the most notable of these being Akiko Yajima as the voice of Roger's disapproving android Dorothy." In 2019, Crunchyroll writer Thomas Zoth ranked The Big O as his top 10 anime since the 1990s.

The Encyclopedia of Science Fiction noted that The Big O was more popular in the United States than in Japan and drew extensively on earlier works and genres. It praised the series' worldbuilding, characters and animation, particularly its visual influences from film noir and Art Deco, but considered its shifts in tone between comedy and philosophical themes unsuccessful. The encyclopedia also noted that the ambiguous ending and unresolved plot elements dissatisfied many viewers.
