= Onegai =

Onegai may refer to:

- Onegai Teacher, a 2002 Japanese anime series
- Onegai Twins, a 2003 Japanese anime series
- Onegai Monster, a strategy game for the Nintendo 64
- Onegai My Melody, a 2008 Japanese Magical Girl anime series
