= Julie Ann Taylor =

American voice actress (born 1966)

- Born: January 29, 1966 (age 60); Orange County, California, U.S.
- Other names: Julie Anne Taylor, Julie Pickering, Jean Howard, Cricket Brown
- Education: University of California, Los Angeles
- Occupation: Voice actress
- Years active: 1988–present
- Notable credit(s): Ai Yori Aoshi as Natsuki Komiya; Fate/stay night as Taiga Fujimura; Love Hina as Mutsumi Otohime; Paradise Kiss as Yukari Hayasaka; Planetes as Ai Tanabe; Rozen Maiden as Souseiseki; Danganronpa as Tenko Chabashira and Ibuki Mioda
- Children: 1

Julie Ann Taylor (born January 29, 1966) is an American voice actress who is best known for her role of Ai Tanabe in Planetes, Mutsumi Otohime in Love Hina, Yukari Hayasaka in Paradise Kiss and Taiga Fujimura in Fate/stay night among others. She is also credited as Julie Pickering, Jean Howard and Cricket Brown.

== Filmography ==
=== Anime ===
- Ai Yori Aoshi~Enishi~ - Natsuki Komiya
- Aldnoah.Zero - Darzana Magbaredge
- Argento Soma - Amian, Joan
- Battle Athletes Victory - Pootashko
- Beyblade Burst Rise - Rogia Koryu (Ep. 1)
- Blade of the Immortal - Otatsu, Haya, Kagehisa Anotsu (Young)
- BlazBlue Alter Memory - Kokonoe, Tsubaki Yayoi List of BlazBlue characters#Mu-12
- Bleach - Lirin, Rin Tsubokura, Haineko (spirit), Nozomi Kujō, Jackie Tristan
- Blood Lad - Officer Beros, Wolf (Young)
- Bludgeoning Angel Dokuro-Chan - Minami
- Blue Exorcist - Exorcist B (Ep. 10), Female Student (Ep. 3), Kashino (Ep. 6), Teacher (Ep. 13)
- Burn Up Scramble - Rio Kinezono
- Carried by the Wind: Tsukikage Ran - Stephanie
- Code Geass - Milly Ashford
- El Hazard - Ifurita, Kalia
- Fate/stay night - Taiga Fujimura, Mordred (Ep. 21)
- Fate/stay night: Unlimited Blade Works - Taiga Fujimura
- Fafner in the Azure - Sakura Kaname
- Figure 17 - Asuka Karasawa, Narrator
- FLCL: Progressive - Hinae Hibajiri
- Gad Guard - Takumi Kisaragi
- Gankutsuou: The Count of Monte Cristo - Heloise, Additional Voices
- Gargantia on the Verdurous Planet - Bellows
- Gate Keepers - Reiko Asagiri
- Ghost in the Shell: Stand Alone Complex - Ran, Additional Voices
- Ghost Slayers Ayashi - Atl
- Grenadier - The Senshi of Smiles - Mikan Kurenai, Kasumi
- Gungrave - Biscoe's Wife, Randy's Wife
- Gun Frontier - Katrina, Ayame
- Hand Maid May - Additional Voices
- Hare+Guu - Hiroko Yamada
- Heat Guy J - Phia, Clair Leonelli (Young), Teto
- Here is Greenwood - Shun Kisaragi
- Honey and Clover - Ayumi Yamada
- Hunter × Hunter 2011 series – Khara
- Hyper Doll - Mica Minazuki
- Immortal Grand Prix - P.A. Announcer
- JoJo's Bizarre Adventure: Stardust Crusaders - Holly Kujo
- Kannazuki no Miko - Makoto
- Karas - Hinaru
- Kurokami: the Animation - Akane Sano
- Kuromukuro - Mirasa, Carrie Dunham
- Last Exile - Sophia Forrester
- Le Portrait de Petit Cossette - Shoko Mataki
- Love Hina - Mutsumi Otohime
- Love Hina Again - Mutsumi Otohime
- Love Live! School Idol Project - Cotaro Yazawa
- Lucky ☆ Star - Yui Narumi
- Lunar Legend Tsukihime - Akiha Tohno
- Mahoromatic - Eimi Shiina
- Magi: The Labyrinth of Magic - Seishun Li, Laila (Ep. 6), Alibaba (Young)
- Mao-chan - Operator
- Marmalade Boy - Doris O'Connor
- Mobile Suit Gundam: Iron-Blooded Orphans - Fumitan Admoss (Ep. 1 - 16)
- Monster - Lotte Frank, Johan (Young)
- Nura: Rise of the Yokai Clan series - Sasami, 12 Year Old Umewakamaru (Young Gyuki), Awashima (Season 2)
- Omishi Magical Theater: Risky Safety - Moe Katsuragi
- One-Punch Man - Split-Chinned Kid
- Overman King Gainer - Lioubov Smettana
- Paradise Kiss - Yukari "Caroline" Hayasaka
- Persona 4: The Animation - Ai Ebihara
- Planetes - Ai Tanabe
- Please Teacher! - Ichigo Morino, Kozue Kusanagi
- Please Twins! - Ichigo Morino
- Rozen Maiden - Souseiseki
- Rurouni Kenshin - Tsubaki, Misanagi
- S-CRY-ed - Chuka, Fani
- Sailor Moon - Haruna Sakurada, Viluy (Viz dub)
- Sailor Moon Crystal - Haruna Sakurada
- Saiyuki Reload - Gojyo (Young), Kanan, Rinlan, Wong
- Sakamoto Days - Kazuko
- Samurai Champloo - Shino
- Samurai Girl Real Bout High School - Shiroi Goto, Tomoe Kusunagi
- Space Pirate Captain Harlock - Kei Yuuki
- Scrapped Princess - Cz
- Stellvia - Ayaka Machida
- Sword Art Online II - Natsuki Aki, Skuld (Ep. 17)
- Sword Art Online: Alicization - Natsuki Aki
- Tengen Toppa Gurren Lagann - Boota
- Tenjho Tenge - Chiaki Kounoke
- Tiger & Bunny - Mari (Ep. 9), Additional Voices
- Trigun - Additional Voices
- The Twelve Kingdoms - Haku Sanshi, Kei Kei
- Vandread - Meia Gisborn
- Witch Hunter Robin - Eiko Yano, Mika Hanamura
- X: The Series - Hokuto Sumeragi and Tohru Magami
- Zegapain - Tomigai and Fosetta (Ai)
- Zetman - Youko Amagi

=== Animation ===
- Enchantimals: Spring into Harvest Hills - Felicity Fox
- Enchantimals: Secrets of Snowy Valley - Felicity Fox

=== Movies ===
- Adventures in Voice Acting - Herself
- Ah! My Goddess: The Movie - Additional Voices
- Akira - Additional Voices (2001 Pioneer dub)
- Eureka Seven: Good Night, Sleep Tight, Young Lovers - Renton Thurston (Young)
- Fate/stay night: Heaven's Feel I. presage flower - Taiga Fujimura
- The Flu - Kim In-hae (Soo Ae)
- Oblivion Island: Haruka and the Magic Mirror - Haruka's Mother
- Mobile Suit Gundam F91 - Monica Arno
- Patlabor: The Movie - Noa Izumi
- Patlabor 2: The Movie - Noa Izumi
- Puella Magi Madoka Magica Movie 3: Rebellion - Junko Kaname
- Sakura Wars: The Movie - Lachette Altair

=== Video games ===
- .hack//Infection - Rachel
- .hack//Mutation - Rachel
- .hack//Outbreak - Rachel
- .hack//Quarantine - Rachel
- BlazBlue series - Tsubaki Yayoi, Kokonoe, Izayoi, List of BlazBlue characters#Mu-12
- Danganronpa 2: Goodbye Despair - Ibuki Mioda
- Danganronpa 2×2 - Ibuki Mioda
- Danganronpa V3: Killing Harmony - Tenko Chabashira
- Eternal Sonata - Falsetto
- Fire Emblem Awakening - Cordelia, Severa
- Fire Emblem Heroes - Linde, Nephenee, Cordelia, Selena
- Nier - Emil (uncredited)
- Nier: Automata - Emil
- Nier Replicant ver.1.22474487139... - Emil, No. 7
- One-Punch Man: A Hero Nobody Knows - Split-Chinned Kid
- Persona 4 - Ai Ebihara (uncredited)
- Puyo Puyo Puzzle Pop - Carbuncle, additional voices
- Re:Zero − Starting Life in Another World: The Prophecy of the Throne - Tivey Pearlbaton
- Rune Factory 5 - Beatrice
- Shenmue III - Additional Cast
- Shira Oka: Second Chances - Alice
- Star Ocean: Second Evolution - Chisato Madison
- Tales of Vesperia - Karol Capel (uncredited)
- The Legend of Heroes: Trails into Reverie - Lillie
- The Legend of Heroes: Trails of Cold Steel IV - Josette Capua
- Soulcalibur IV - Hildegard von Krone
- Soulcalibur: Broken Destiny - Hildegard von Krone
- Soulcalibur V - Hildegard von Krone
- Soulcalibur VI - Hildegard von Krone
- Story of Seasons: Grand Bazaar - Additional voices
- Xenoblade Chronicles X - Additional voices
