= Here Is Greenwood =

Japanese manga and its franchise

- Cover of the first volume of the 2000–2001 Hakusensha Bunko release of the manga

ここはグリーン・ウッド (Koko wa Gurīn Uddo)
- Genre: Romance
- Manga
- Written by: Yukie Nasu
- Published by: Hakusensha
- English publisher: NA: Viz Media
- Magazine: Hana to Yume
- Original run: 1986 – 1991
- Volumes: 9
- Original video animation
- Directed by: Tomomi Mochizuki
- Produced by: Yuuko Sakurai; Mitsuo Kaminashi (1–2); Michiyuki Honma (3–6)
- Written by: Tomomi Mochizuki
- Music by: Shigeru Nagata
- Studio: Studio Pierrot
- Licensed by: NA: Media Blasters (expired), Software Sculptors (former)
- Released: November 22, 1991 – March 26, 1993
- Episodes: 6
- Television drama
- Directed by: Mikisuke Honda; Toshibumi Shimizu; Chikato Kumizawa; Nozomi Aida
- Written by: Ayuna Fujisaki; Keiichiro Ochi; Megumi Sasano
- Music by: Tsuyoshi Watanabe
- Original network: Tokyo MX
- Original run: July 2, 2008 – September 24, 2008
- Episodes: 13
- icon

Here Is Greenwood (ここはグリーン・ウッド, Koko wa Gurīn Uddo) is a nine-volume Japanese manga written and illustrated by Yukie Nasu, revolving around the activities of four boys in Greenwood Dormitory at a fictional prestigious Japanese all-boys private school named Ryokuto Academy. The manga was serialized in Hana to Yume from 1986 to 1991 and published in English by Viz Media. It has been adapted into a six-episode anime OVA and a live-action television series.

== Plot ==
Kazuya Hasekawa is the younger brother to Kazuhiro, who has raised the both of them since they were orphaned. The elder brother is both teasing and doting, and he has attended the prestigious boys-only Ryokuto Academy and then college, all while caring for Kazuya.

Having finished middle school and passed the entrance exam, Kazuya has finally entered Ryokuto Academy. He chooses to reside there in order to flee life at home, since his brother has just married the young woman on whom Kazuya has had a crush. Unfortunately, Kazuya has a medical crisis which delays his high school entry by a few weeks. Life is made harder for him by Kazuhiro returning to take the position of the academy's school nurse.

When Kazuya finally does start the semester, he is assigned to live in the remote dormitory on campus known as Greenwood. He feels out of place because of his late entry, which has meant that everyone else has a better grasp of the situations there. Worse, the serious and strait-laced Kazuya also is agonized because, in Greenwood, eccentricities abound.

Among its single and double occupancy rooms are oddities such as gamblers, computer freaks, evangelists, and even a powerfully built upperclassman who rooms with his motorcycle, which he easily carries up and down the stairs. Kazuya's assigned roommate is a fellow freshman: the long-haired Shun Kisaragi. Kisaragi is a feminine man who is frequently confused for a woman.

Next-door to them are Mitsuru Ikeda and Shinobu Tezuka. The pair are roommates and best friends. The perfect scion of an illustrious family, Shinobu is the pleasant yet ruthless class president, a peerless achiever who enjoys toying with their new awkward neighbor. Resident Adviser Mitsuru is the cheerful official authority of Greenwood, who also abuses his power to troll Kazuya with teasing and pranks. Mitsuru is portrayed as an absurd character who is so lucky it often defies credibility.

The manga follows the everyday events and antics of the characters of Greenwood, most particularly the adventures of Kazuya with Shun, Mitsuru, and Shinobu.

== Characters ==
=== Main characters ===
- Kazuya Hasukawa (蓮川 一也)

Voiced by: Nozomu Sasaki (Japanese); Ted Lewis (TAJ dub), Kevin Hatcher (Bang Zoom! dub) (English)
Kazuya was raised by his older brother, Kazuhiro, after the death of their parents when they were younger. Kazuya had applied to enter Ryokuto Academy so he could be just like Kazuhiro. Kazuya had fallen in love with Sumire, his tutor, and was heartbroken when she fell in love with Kazuhiro and married him. Kazuya had lost respect for his brother since then and moved into the dorm to get away from them. Unfortunately, Kazuya suffered injuries due to a car accident, an ulcer and other mishaps that had delayed him from entering the academy. Much to his dismay, he has to deal with the craziness in the Greenwood dorm and the fact that Kazuhiro is the school nurse. Eventually, he gets used to living in the dorm, and is voted president of the dorm by Mitsuru. He later falls in love with a delinquent girl, Miya Igarashi, and dates her in the end of the manga and anime.
Portrayed by Yuki Izawa in the live-action series.

- Shun Kisaragi (如月 瞬)

Voiced by: Chika Sakamoto (Japanese); Lee Quick (TAJ dub), Julie Ann Taylor (Bang Zoom! dub) (English)
Shun is Kazuya's easygoing roommate. Although Kisaragi resembles a cute, tomboyish girl, he's actually a guy. Shun is the oldest son of the Kisaragi family, who run a chain of traditional Japanese inns. The females in the Kisaragi family inherit the company, but it has no connection with Shun's girlish figure. Surprisingly, Shun is heterosexual and dated a girl in junior high. Shun is very self-confident and proud of his beautiful long hair, and he knows he is so cute. Because he thinks it is the best way to be cool, he does not hesitate to dress like a girl. He can makes sound decisions and is a man of action, and no character believes that Shun is actually feminine. Shun has a younger brother named Reina and an infant sister named Yui.
Portrayed by Hiroki Suzuki in the live-action series.

- Mitsuru Ikeda (池田 光流)

Voiced by: Mitsuo Iwata (Japanese); Dan Olk (TAJ dub), Jim Taggert (Bang Zoom! dub) (English)
The President of Greenwood dormitory, and best friend of Shinobu Tezuka. The adopted son of the caretaker of the Ikeda temple in Tokyo, Mitsuru looks like Kazuya's brother in his younger days, and Mitsuru also seems to enjoy giving Kazuya a hard time. Mitsuru is roommates with Shinobu and lives next door to Kazuya and Shun, creating an interesting foursome. He also has an unusual ability: His face is able to heal any cut or bruise in under a minute. All that rough treatment on Kazuya, however, is merely his way of toughening up Kazuya so he can take Mitsuru's place as Residence Hall President. Also, he tries his best to stay away from his adopted family. Since he was a child, he knew he was adopted, and he knew he didn't really belong, so he tries to distance himself from his adopted family.
Portrayed by Riki Miura in the live-action series.

- Shinobu Tezuka (手塚 忍)

Voiced by: Toshihiko Seki (Japanese); Charles Roth (TAJ dub), Dave Leyland (Bang Zoom! dub) (English)
The smartest student living in Greenwood dormitory, and best friend of Mitsuru Ikeda. Unlike Mitsuru, Shinobu is calm and quiet and is unaffected by anything. His near perfect attitude and talent is what drives his cousin Nagisa full of jealousy.
Portrayed by Yuuichi Sato in the live-action series.

=== Supporting characters ===
- Kazuhiro Hasukawa (蓮川 一弘)

Voiced by: Kazuhiko Inoue (Japanese); Billy Regan (TAJ dub), Ron Allen (Bang Zoom! dub) (English)
Kazuya's older brother and the school nurse at Ryokuto Academy. He likes to tease Kazuya, but lovingly cares for him. He is married to Sumire.
Portrayed by: Kengo Ohkuchi

- Sumire Hasukawa (蓮川 すみれ)

Voiced by: Sumi Shimamoto (Japanese); P.R. Wellington (TAJ dub), Caren Love (Bang Zoom! dub) (English)
Kazuhiro's wife and Kazuya's former crush, now sister-in-law. She cares for both brothers, and affectionately calls Kazuya "Ya-kun".
Portrayed by: Yukari Fukui

- Miya Igarashi (五十嵐巳夜)

Voiced by: Chieko Honda (Japanese); Melanie Smith (TAJ dub), Kate Higgins (Bang Zoom! dub) (English)
A delinquent high school girl, she is the object of affection for Kazuya. She defies her mother's wishes to be with her childhood friend Tenma Koizumi in order to be with Kazuya. She is also friends with Mitsuru.
Portrayed by: Aoi Yoshikura

- Tenma Koizumi (小泉典馬)

Voiced by: Kappei Yamaguchi (Japanese); Jim Malone (TAJ dub), Sam Riegel (Bang Zoom! dub (English)
Miya's childhood friend, who is Kazuya's rival for Miya's affection.

- Nagisa Tezuka (手塚 渚)

Voiced by: Hiromi Tsuru (Japanese); P.R. Wellington (TAJ dub), Wendee Lee (Bang Zoom! dub) (English)
Shinobu's older cousin, she is insanely jealous of Shinobu since childhood and wants to ruin his life. She once kidnapped Mitsuru and stripped him of his clothes in an attempt to get Shinobu to submit to her, but he managed to foil her plans. She tries again, but accidentally abducts Shun's younger brother, Reina. She has a group of henchman - simply called "A", "B", "C" and "D" - to help her with her plans.

- Reina Kisaragi (如月 麗名)

Voiced by: Taeko Kawata (Japanese); Kayzie Rogers (TAJ dub), Faye Lansing (Bang Zoom! dub) (English)
Shun's younger brother, who is cute and also looks like a girl. He is accidentally kidnapped by Nagisa's men while on his way to visit Shun in the dorm.

- Shin'ichiro Furusawa (古沢 進一郎)

Voiced by: Kenyū Horiuchi (Japanese); Eric Stuart (TAJ dub), Lex Lang (Bang Zoom! dub) (English)
A senior student at the dorm. He lives with his motorcycle and carries it around with him. He has a girlfriend named Yuko.
Portrayed by: Hiroshi Nagao

== Media ==
=== Manga ===
The manga had run in Hakuensha's Hana to Yume shōjo magazine from 1986 to 1991. The manga was collected in eleven volumes. In North America, the manga was released in English by Viz Media in nine volumes.

=== Anime ===
A six-episode OVA series, produced by Pierrot was released between 1991 and 1993. The OVAs were initially licensed by Software Sculptors, who released the series on VHS and Laserdisc in 1996, with an English dub produced by TAJ Productions. The anime was then licensed to Media Blasters in 2004, who released the series on DVD featuring a new English dub by Bang Zoom! Entertainment.

=== Live action/drama ===
A thirteen episode live-action television drama was broadcast by Tokyo MX, between July 2, 2008, and September 24, 2008.
