= Mitsuo Iwata =

Japanese actor and voice actor (born 1967)

- 岩田 光央
- Born: July 31, 1967 (age 59); Tokorozawa, Saitama, Japan
- Occupations: Actor; voice actor; singer
- Years active: 1977–present
- Agent: Aoni Production
- Height: 165 cm (5 ft 5 in)
- Spouse: Rikako Aikawa (m. 1992; div. 2025)
- Children: Anji Iwata(Voice actor)

Mitsuo Iwata (岩田 光央, Iwata Mitsuo; born July 31, 1967) is a Japanese actor, voice actor, and singer who was born in Tokorozawa, Saitama. He is previously married to voice actress Rikako Aikawa. Mania.com praised him as "truly one of the greatest seiyuu". Otakunews.com complimented him for the role of Tetsuya from Outlanders. Mania.com comments on his role of Kintaro Oe (Golden Boy) that he "practiced months before hand [sic], to the point of going hoarse from overwork, to perfect Kintaro's voice" and "there's no one who could replace him for this role". He is also known for the role of Kaneda in the 1988 anime film Akira and won the 7th Seiyu Awards for Best Personality in 2013. He was previously affiliated with Office Osawa and Across Entertainment, but is currently affiliated with Aoni Production.

== Filmography ==
=== Television animation ===
- DNA^2 (1994), Kakimaro Someya
- Adventures of Mini-Goddess (1998), Gan-chan
- Hikaru no Go (2002), Atsushi Kurata
- Please Twins! (2003), Hyosuke Magumo
- Inuyasha (2004), Suzaku
- Futari wa Pretty Cure Splash Star (2006), Dorodoron
- D.Gray-Man (2006), Arystar Krory III
- Hayate the Combat Butler (2007), Akane Himegami
- Koi suru Tenshi Angelique (2007), Zephel
- One Piece (2010), Emporio Ivankov (second voice)
- Panty & Stocking with Garterbelt (2010), Ghost [Episode 1 Part 2: "Death Race 2010"]
- Kill la Kill (2013), Takaharu Fukuroda
- World Trigger (2014), Isami Tōma
- Space Patrol Luluco (2016), Keiji
- March Comes in like a Lion (2016), Manabu Yasui
- 100% Pascal-sensei (2017), Demon Pascal (ep. 3)/Demon Pascal D (ep. 8), Hell Emperor Pascal (ep. 23)
- Demon Slayer: Kimetsu no Yaiba (2019), Toyo
- Jujutsu Kaisen (2020), Kiyotaka Ijichi
- Dragon Quest: The Adventure of Dai (2020), Zaboera
- Edens Zero (2021), Mosco Versa-0
- Getter Robo Arc (2021), Captain Misa Igari, General Basilisk
- Lucifer and the Biscuit Hammer (2022), Lee Soleil
- Dark Gathering (2023), Brainstem Spirit
- The Duke of Death and His Maid 2nd Season (2023), Free
- MF Ghost (2023), Itsuki Takeuchi
- Sasaki and Peeps (2024), Marc
- BECK (xxxx), Tanabe
- Brigadoon: Marin & Melan (xxxx), Mike White
- Cyborg 009 (xxxx), Pyunma/Cyborg 008
- Daphne in the Brilliant Blue (xxxx), Tsutomu Hanaoka
- DC Super Heroes vs. Eagle Talon (xxxx), Penguin
- Digimon Frontier (xxxx), Piddomon
- Doki Doki School Hours (xxxx), Gen Nakamura ("Oyaji")
- Dragon Ball Super (xxxx), Champa, Majora
- Gonna be the Twin-Tail!! (xxxx), Owl Guildy
- Haven't You Heard? I'm Sakamoto (xxxx), Fukase
- I'm Gonna Be An Angel! (xxxx), Dispel
- Initial D (xxxx), Itsuki Takeuchi (Iggy Takeuchi)
- The King of Braves GaoGaiGar (xxxx), Mic Sounders, Stallion White
- Magica Wars (xxxx), Toro
- Mirmo! (xxxx), Incho
- Nurarihyon no Mago (xxxx), Ungaikyo
- Oruchuban Ebichu (xxxx), Maa-kun
- Please Teacher! (xxxx), Hyosuke Magumo
- Saiki Kusuo no Psi-nan (xxxx), Kuniharu Saiki
- Shakugan no Shana (xxxx), Marchosias
- Shakugan no Shana Second (xxxx), Marchosias
- Shakugan no Shana III Final (xxxx), Marchosias
- Shirobako (xxxx), Yoshikazu Inanami, Tomigaya
- Sonic the Hedgehog (xxxx), Rotor the Walrus (also voiced by Kozo Shioya)
- Toriko (xxxx), Sunny
- Vandread (xxxx), Pyoro
- Yagami-kun's Family Affairs (xxxx), Ichigaya
- Beyblade: Metal Fusion (xxxx), Brazilian Blader DJ

=== Animated films ===
- Akira (1988), Kaneda
- Dead Leaves (2004), 666 (Three-Six)
- Dōbutsu no Mori (2006), Kappei/Kapp'n
- Jujutsu Kaisen 0 (2021), Kiyotaka Ijichi

=== Original video animation (OVA) ===
- Outlanders (1986), Tetsuya Wakatsuki
- Here is Greenwood (1991), Mitsuru
- Golden Boy (1995), Kintaro Oe
- My Dear Marie (1996), Hiroshi
- Bludgeoning Angel Dokuro-Chan (xxxx), Binkan Salaryman
- Irresponsible Captain Tylor (xxxx), Kojiro
- Shakugan no Shana (xxxx), Marcosias
- You're Being Summoned, Azazel (xxxx), Seiya

=== Video games ===
- Angelique (1994), Zephel
- Angelique Special 2 (1995), Zephel
- Street Fighter III: Third Strike (1999), Sean
- Angelique Trois (2000), Zephel
- The King of Fighters '99 Evolution (2000), Syo Kirishima
- The King of Fighters 2000 (2000), Syo Kirishima
- Gitaroo Man (2001), Puma
- Kingdom Hearts (2002), Peter Pan
- The King of Fighters 2002 (2002), Kusanagi (as "???")
- Angelique Etoile (2003), Zephel
- The King of Fighters 2003 (2003), Kusanagi
- The King of Fighters Neowave (2005), Kusanagi
- Sonic Unleashed (2008), Orbot
- Tales of Vesperia (2008), Yeager
- The King of Fighters 2002: Unlimited Match (2009), Kusanagi
- Sonic Colors (2010), Orbot
- Sonic Generations (2011), Orbot
- Mario & Sonic at the London 2012 Olympic Games (2011), Orbot
- Sonic Lost World (2013), Orbot
- Mario & Sonic at the Sochi 2014 Olympic Winter Games (2013), Orbot
- Sonic Forces (2017), Orbot
- The King of Fighter for Girls (2020), Choi Bounge
- Arad Senki: Slap Up Party (xxxx), Harusen
- Initial D Arcade Stage (xxxx), Itsuki Takeuchi

=== Drama CDs ===
- Abunai series 4: Abunai Campus Love (Sakura Nanba)
- Eden wo Tooku ni Hanarete series 2: Ryokuin no Rakuen (Masayuki Kawahara)
- Eden wo Tooku ni Hanarete series 3: Setsunai Yoru no Rakuen (Masayuki Kawahara)
- Mainichi Seiten! series 1 (Jou Obinata)
- Mainichi Seiten! series 2: Kodomo wa Tomaranai (Jou Obinata)
- Ourin Gakuen series 1: Ikenai Seitokaishitsu (Kyouhei Fukazawa)
- Rolex ni Kuchizukewo (Chikao Ootsuka)
- Sakurazawa vs Hakuhou series 1: Shokuinshitsu de Naisho no Romance (Kyousuku Sonoda)

=== Tokusatsu ===
Year	Title	Role	Notes
2009	Samurai Sentai Shinkenger	Ayakashi Sogizarai	ep. 36
2011	Kaizoku Sentai Gokaiger	Bibaboo	ep. 44
2015	Shuriken Sentai Ninninger	Youkai Enraenra	ep. 11
2016	Doubutsu Sentai Zyuohger	Quval	eps. 1 - 27, 30 - 42
2017	Doubutsu Sentai Zyuohger vs. Ninninger the Movie: Super Sentai's Message from the Future	Quval	
2020–2021	Mashin Sentai Kiramager	Mashin Shovellow	

=== Dubbing roles ===
==== Live-action ====
- 10 Things I Hate About You (Michael Eckman (David Krumholtz))
- Enchanted (Pip)
- Evolution (2005 NTV edition) (Danny Donald (Michael Bower))
- The Final Destination (Hunt Wynorski (Nick Zano))
- Ghostbusters (Rowan North (Neil Casey))
- Jurassic World (2017 NTV edition) (Lowery Cruthers (Jake Johnson))
- S. Darko (Jeremy Frame (Jackson Rathbone))
- Sabrina the Teenage Witch (Harvey Kinkle (Nate Richert))
- Stand by Me (1989 Fuji TV edition) (Teddy Duchamp (Corey Feldman))

==== Animation ====
- The Incredibles (Young Buddy Pine/IncrediBoy)
- Peter Pan (Peter Pan) [1984 Buena Vista version]
- Tom & Jerry (Real Estate Rat)
