= Waiting in the Summer =

2012 anime series

- Cover of first BD volume featuring Ichika Takatsuki

あの夏で待ってる (Ano Natsu de Matteru)
- Genre: Drama, romantic comedy, science fiction
- Created by: I*Chi*Ka
- Anime television series
- Directed by: Tatsuyuki Nagai
- Produced by: Mitsutoshi Ogura; Yūji Matsukura; Ryūtarō Kawakami
- Written by: Yōsuke Kuroda
- Music by: I've Sound; Maiko Iuchi
- Studio: J.C.Staff
- Licensed by: AUS: Madman Entertainment (expired); NA: Sentai Filmworks; UK: MVM Films
- Original network: TVA, KBS, AT-X, Tokyo MX, BS11, Sun TV
- English network: US: Anime Network
- Original run: January 10, 2012 – March 27, 2012
- Episodes: 12
- Manga
- Written by: I*Chi*Ka
- Illustrated by: Pepako Dokuta
- Published by: ASCII Media Works
- Magazine: Dengeki Daioh
- Original run: March 2012 – February 2013
- Volumes: 3
- Original video animation
- Directed by: Tatsuyuki Nagai
- Written by: Yōsuke Kuroda
- Music by: Maiko Iuchi
- Studio: J.C. Staff
- Licensed by: NA: Sentai Filmworks
- Released: August 29, 2014
- Runtime: 27 minutes

Waiting in the Summer (あの夏で待ってる, Ano Natsu de Matteru) is a 2012 Japanese anime television series animated by J.C.Staff, produced by Genco and Geneon, and directed by Tatsuyuki Nagai. The screenplay was written by Yōsuke Kuroda with original character design by Taraku Uon, who both contributed in the creation of the Please! franchise (Please Teacher! and Please Twins!). The 12-episode series aired in Japan between January and March 2012 on TV Aichi and KBS. Sentai Filmworks has licensed the anime for release in North America. The staff of the anime returned to produce an original video animation episode in August 2014. A manga adaptation illustrated by Pepako Dokuta was serialized in ASCII Media Works' Dengeki Daioh magazine.

== Plot ==
Kaito Kirishima, a high school student, has his quiet life transformed after a mysterious incident one summer night. While testing a new video camera on a bridge, Kaito witnesses a bright blue streak of light in the sky and is knocked over the railing. He awakens the next morning in his own bed with no memory of what happened the previous night, and with no visible injuries. As life returns to normal, Kaito and his friends decide to use the camera to make a film during their summer break, turning the project into a way to spend time together.

The group's plans expand when Kaito's friend Tetsuro Ishigaki invites the new upperclassman Ichika Takatsuki and her friend Remon Yamano to join the film, with Kaito feeling inexplicably drawn to Ichika. While Kaito and Ichika grow closer, the truth behind the mysterious incident and Ichika's own secret gradually comes into focus.

== Characters ==
=== Main characters ===
Kaito Kirishima (霧島 海人, Kirishima Kaito)
Voiced by: Nobunaga Shimazaki (Japanese); Bryson Baugus (English)
The male protagonist is a student in his first year of high school. He is an avid videographer and constantly out recording on an 8mm handheld camera that he inherited from his late grandfather; his parents have also died, so he uses film to create memories of people that will persist after their deaths. Others sometimes refer to him as "The Director", though he does not mind delegating creative control to Remon. Ever since meeting Ichika, he is attracted to her, avoiding the attentions of Kanna or Kaori. Even though she is an alien, Kaito accepts Ichika, and they later become a couple. Before Ichika left to go back to her planet, he promised to love her forever. It is shown that before Kaito and his friends graduated from high school, they completed the film, adding a scene that reveals that Ichika was able to return to Earth again.
Ichika Takatsuki (貴月 イチカ, Takatsuki Ichika)
Voiced by: Haruka Tomatsu (Japanese); Christina Kelly (English)
The female protagonist is an alien whose ship accidentally crash-lands on Earth, injuring Kaito. She saves him by transferring the medical treatment nanomachines in her cells through kissing and remains with him initially in order to be certain that he is in good condition. She transfers into Kaito's high school and becomes a third-year student in the same class as Remon Yamano, who becomes her best friend. She is kind, polite, and friendly, eagerly taking up domestic duties in the Kirishima household. Being an alien unaccustomed to life on Earth, Ichika sometimes acts weird in the eyes of others (such as cooking bizarre, yet still edible combinations of food). When people question her actions, she fears that they will realize she is an alien and report her to the Men in Black, so she initially avoids serious conversations about the past or Kaito's feelings. Ichika eventually revealed to the group that she is an alien, but it didn't bother them at all, especially Kaito who subconsciously suspected her identity due to their first meeting. Influenced by Kanna's insistence that she was making excuses to not seize happiness, Ichika confessed to Kaito and began dating him. Ichika said that she would continue loving Kaito, even after she left the planet. At the end of the series, Ichika is shown in the final scene of the completed film, revealing that she was able to return to Earth again.
Kanna Tanigawa (谷川 柑菜, Tanigawa Kanna)
Voiced by: Kaori Ishihara (Japanese); Hilary Haag (English)
An outgoing girl who is quick to speak her mind. Ever since they met in middle school, she has been a close friend of Kaito, whom she has a crush on. Kaito's sister is aware of this and encourages a relationship between the two. Under the influence of drinks, Kanna becomes flirtatious, much to her embarrassment. In a running gag, whenever she wears cute clothes, Ichika wears the same kind of clothing and looks better than her. Kanna told Ichika that they both like Kaito while Kaito only likes Ichika, so being an alien is no excuse for Ichika to not be happy with him. Afterwards she was depressed for a while; then she got over it and confessed her love to Kaito and accepted his rejection with a smile. Kanna has been friends with Tetsuro since childhood; she does not return his feelings for her.
Tetsuro Ishigaki (石垣 哲朗, Ishigaki Tetsuro)
Voiced by: Hideki Ogihara (Japanese); Scott Gibbs (English)
A close friend of Kaito. He has been friends with Kanna since childhood and encourages her to confess to Kaito. At the same time, he invited Ichika to help make the movie, actually hoping that Kaito would end up with Ichika, so Kanna would be available for Tetsuro. He later confessed to Kanna and knew she would reject it; he just wanted to not regret saying it. Tetsuro is handsome and has a way with women, a knack for memorizing their names and faces. He also develops a closer relationship with Mio after supporting her through her problems and learning about her crush on him. During the final battle, Tetsuro asks Mio on a date to the movies.
Mio Kitahara (北原 美桜, Kitahara Mio)
Voiced by: Kana Asumi (Japanese); Maggie Flecknoe (English)
A good friend of Kanna. She is initially a shy girl with long hair, innocently ending up in sexual situations. However, she is withdrawn mostly because she is embarrassed by the unusual lifestyle of her family: nudism. She only came to understand normal society in middle school when she met Kanna and Tetsuro, who brought her out of her shell. After revealing her lifestyle and confessing to Tetsuro, Mio cuts her hair short, and Tetsuro acknowledges her as a strong person. Observant and selfless, she continues to comfort him even after he did not accept her feelings.
Remon Yamano (山乃 檸檬, Yamano Remon)
Voiced by: Yukari Tamura (Japanese); Brittney Karbowski (English)
A third-year high school student with a petite appearance and a distinctive laugh of "ufufu". She does not seek out other people until Ichika transfers into her class. The two girls become best friends and join the film creation project. Remon is mischievous: she proposes lewd dares in the king's game and serves alcoholic drinks. Since she claims to have written a script for Lucas in Hollywood, she ends up being the writer for the group's film, where she makes Ichika's character an alien. Manami brings her age into question, and Remon says she is "forever seventeen". When Ichika does reveal that she is an alien, Remon is extremely prepared for the resulting battles. The final episode reveals that Remon is an agent of the Men in Black.

=== Other characters ===
Rinon (りのん)
Voiced by: Rina Hidaka (Japanese); Luci Christian (English)
A companion to Ichika, this alien lifeform is nonhumanoid, stands roughly 12 inches tall, and is the organic computer interface for Ichika's spaceship. It is also able to teleport Ichika, operate support machinery, and aid her in healing Kaito when necessary. After Ichika has been brought back to her home planet, Rinon remains on Earth and stays with Remon at the Men in Black agency. However, when Ichika comes back again, Rinon is seen on her shoulder.
Nanami Kirishima (霧島 七海, Kirishima Nanami)
Voiced by: Aya Hisakawa (Japanese); Olivia Swasey (English)
Kaito's big sister. She dotes on Kaito ever since their parents' death and is easily moved to tears. She trusts Ichika to take care of Kaito when she goes on a business trip to Bolivia and leaves the two alone in their house.
Manami Ogura (小倉 真奈美, Ogura Manami)
Voiced by: Fuyuka Oura (Japanese); Shelley Calene-Black (English)
Tetsuro's older sister. She is married to Satoshi Ogura, but frequently quarrels with him (usually due to the simplest things) and stays over at Tetsuro's apartment to cool down. Her husband was revealed to be part of the Men in Black agency in the last episode.
Kaori Kinoshita (樹下 佳織, Kinoshita Kaori)
Voiced by: Ai Kayano (Japanese); Allison Sumrall (English)
Kaito's elementary classmate. She sat next to Kaito in elementary school. She calls Kaito Umi-chan .
Chiharu Arisawa (有澤 千春, Arisawa Chiharu)
Voiced by: Yuka Iguchi (Japanese); Natalie Rial (English)
Kaori's friend. She is obsessed with Tetsuro which makes Mio jealous. She is also aggressive and strong, with stamina to match.
Emika Takatsuki (貴月 エミカ, Takatsuki Emika)
Voiced by: Yui Horie (Japanese); Patricia Duran (English)
Ichika's sister. She comes to Earth to bring her sister home, but seeing her love for Kaito, she decided to offer assistance to fulfill her wish with Remon's help.

== Media ==
=== Anime ===
The Waiting in the Summer anime television series directed by Tatsuyuki Nagai and produced by J.C.Staff and Genco began airing in Japan on January 10, 2012, on the TV Aichi and KBS television networks. The screenplay was written by Yōsuke Kuroda, who originally conceived the series with original character designer Taraku Uon. Masayoshi Tanaka based the character design used in the anime on Uon's concepts. The music was mainly produced by Maiko Iuchi, with other members of I've Sound, and the sound director is Jin Aketagawa. The opening theme is "Sign" sung by Ray, featuring lyrics written by Kotoko and composed by Shinji Orito of Key. The ending theme is "Vidro Moyō" (ビードロ模様) sung by Nagi Yanagi, who also wrote the lyrics, and is composed by Tomoyuki Nakazawa of I've Sound. The single for "Sign" was released on February 8, 2012, and the single for "Vidro Moyō" was released on February 29, 2012. Sentai Filmworks has licensed the anime for release in North America, and Crunchyroll is streaming the series in North and South America. Madman Entertainment licensed the series for release in Australia and New Zealand. The staff of the anime returned to produce an original video animation episode released with the Blu-ray box set on August 29, 2014. Sentai Filmworks re-released the series with an English dub on August 20, 2019.

No.	Title	Original release date
1	"I Can't, Senpai" "Komarimasu, Senpai." (困ります、先輩。)	January 10, 2012
While testing his high-speed film video camera, first year high school student Kaito Kirishima sees a bright blue light, then an impact has blown him off of his footing and beyond the railings. He sees a hand grabbing his as he fell, bloodied, only to wake up in his futon the next day. At his school, a transfer student named Ichika Takatsuki comes to a third year class. Somehow the both of them has a familiarity with each other when his classmate Tetsuro approaches her and her classmate Remon Yamano, proposing that she joins a movie project he and Kaito are planning. She accepts it without hesitation, and Remon volunteers to write the script. Kaito's classmates Kanna Tanigawa and Mio Kitahara volunteered later. When Kaito goes to test his camera after class, he finds Ichika fishing in the river. He finds out that she has nowhere to go, so he unwittingly offered her to stay at his house, given that his sister will be away for three months. Back home, as Ichika takes a bath, Kaito felt pain in his neck, then sees a flashback of what happened the evening before. Ichika finds him unconscious, with a sign of increased metabolism on the area where that insect bite was. Ichika then calls for her assistant Rinon to stop it, as she kissed him. Exactly as Kanna and Kaito's sister Nanami arrive.
2	"Together with Senpai..." "Senpai to Issho..." (先輩といっしょ...)	January 17, 2012
In this episode Ichika is revealed to be an alien journeying to look for a certain scenery that she has been seeing in her imagination. She crash lands on Earth when her spacecraft hits space debris. Meanwhile, Nanami awakens, saying she has had a dream about Kaito being hugged by a naked girl in a ball of light. Nanami gets to know Ichika, and out of nervousness the latter almost reveals that she is an alien, but manages to convince them that she is a foreign student. Listening to her story, Nanami lets her move in with them, since she will be away for quite some time, and she was looking for someone to take care of Kaito. Kanna was surprised to hear it, even thinking it to be some sort of a wedding arrangement in exasperation. After seeing Nanami off the next day, and right after shopping for clothes for Ichika, Kaito finds Remon, Tetsuro, Mio and Kanna inside the house—to talk about the movie project. After Remon served them some sort of spiked alcoholic drink, which had "bad" effects on Kanna, Kaito again fainted due to the same illness, but Ichika kissed it away.
3	"Senpai Says..." "Senpai ga Icchau..." (先輩が言っちゃう...)	January 24, 2012
Kaito seems to be frustrated with his failed attempt to confess to Ichika, so he decides to ditch school, telling her to leave him alone for a while. Worried, Kanna goes to visit him at his house. Her visit turned into a date as the two went to Karuizawa. Ichika sees them from a distance and follows them. Kanna had to leave Kaito when she finds out Remon has been filming their "date." It so happened that Ichika crosses paths with Kaito. Nervous of the prospect that she wants to talk to him, he runs away from her, and a chase ensues. It was all about a misunderstanding—that Kaito wants to know Ichika's secret, while Ichika wants to know who dumped Kaito. When Kaito took some footage of Ichika, it turned out into some sort of an informal confession. Shocked, Kaito stops filming her.
4	"Senpai was Amazing" "Senpai wa Sugokatta." (先輩はすごかった。)	January 31, 2012
Things turn awkward the next day, but they try to put it behind them. More complications arrive when Manami, Tetsuro's married sister, takes Kaito shopping. Ichika sees them, and follows them via teleportation with Rinon's help, even to Manami's apartment. Worried about what will happen next, Ichika enters and tries to take him home, though not without clashing a bit with Manami. Tetsuro arrives and clears things up, telling Ichika that Manami is already married, and she is here because of a petty quarrel with her husband. As an apology, Ichika asked Kaito if she could do anything for him. He asked if she could help him review for the finals, to which she agreed, and helped him study until the final day of exams.
5	"Senpai is a Heroine" "Senpai wa Hiroin." (先輩はヒロイン。)	February 7, 2012
Ichika becomes the heroine of the independent film the gang were planning before summer break. Kaito agrees, while helping Ichika look for that particular place she is looking for. Kanna becomes uneasy when the lines for the film becomes somewhat uncannily realistic, especially in the scenes involving Kaito and Ichika. Even Kaito was surprised by Ichika's questions that evening. As the next day was a rainy one and filming is cancelled, Kanna goes to Kaito's house to bring some nozawana. That evening, Tetsuro, after meeting an uneasy home-bound Kanna, sneaks into Kaito's room. He tells him that she, his childhood friend, is in love with him. Ichika overhears the conversation.
6	"Senpai's Rival" "Senpai ni Raibaru." (先輩にライバル。)	February 14, 2012
As Ichika is pondering on what Tetsuro told Kaito that night, thanks to Tetsuro's sister, filming for their movie goes to Okinawa, where Kaito meets a childhood friend, and her companion is attracted to Tetsuro. This puts Kanna and Ichika at an unease, especially when Kaori, the girl, says that Kaito is her fiancé. Mio, on the other hand, is uneasy herself when Chiharu, Kaori's companion, sets her sights on Tetsuro.
7	"Senpai's Feelings" "Senpai no Kimochi." (先輩の気持ち。)	February 21, 2012
Ichika's worries are banished when she gets to the root of what's going on with Kaori and Kaito; while Mio does her best to protect Tetsuro from a ravenous Chiharu—to a point of revealing a secret. The group wrapped up their filming the next day, as Kaori and Chiharu leaves for the airport right after filming.
8	"Senpai in Trouble" "Senpai ga Pinch," (先輩がPinch,)	February 28, 2012
After Ichika enjoys her first Japanese festival, Remon pops out of nowhere to challenge everyone to a test of courage at a dark shrine. During the test Rinon appears to Ichika, telling that an emergency beacon has been activated. True enough, a Federation lifeboat (a rescue drone) comes to rescue her (it's more of taking her by force), but Ichika refuses, saying she has still a lot to do. Then again, when Kaito hears Ichika scream, he rushed to where she is, abandoning his partner Kanna. Even with the help of Rinna, one of Ichika's machines, Kaito dies rescuing "the one he loves." Ichika, however, manages to reverse Kaito's death. Kaito awakens and sees himself with Ichika inside a ball of light, and mysteriously returning to the same spot. Everyone catches up to the two and sees Ichika incessantly apologizing in front of Kaito.
9	"Senpai" "Senpai" (せんぱい)	March 6, 2012
After the incident involving the rescue drone Ichika reveals her true identity to Kaito and the gang, and reveals her true intentions on Earth, namely "looking for that place in her memory." Kaito, however, isn't surprised because he already knows the fact. However, with the rather rough "rescue attempt" by the Federation rescue drone, she believes that another will come to investigate, and fears that her days on Earth are numbered; thus shunning Kaito for a while—and sealing her feelings for him. This irritated Kanna, telling Ichika that "looking for that place" is just an excuse to avoid him. Kanna confessed that she has feelings for Kaito, and runs away after confronting Ichika—only to be consoled later by Tetsuro, hurting Mio in the process. Kaito, with a bit of encouragement from Remon, did confess to Ichika later—and, when Kaito said it's his first kiss, she revealed that she has kissed Kaito four times already, as she gave him the fifth one.
10	"Senpai's and ours" "Senpai to Bokura no." (先輩と僕らの。)	March 12, 2012
As Ichika and Kaito spend some time close together (which Ichika credits to Kanna), a depressed Kanna shuts herself in her room after a visit from Tetsuro, who tells everyone that she has a cold. He meets Mio on the way, where they shared the cake she was to give Kanna. There Mio asks and hears his reason why he invited Ichika to do the film with them. Angry at himself, Tetsuro kicks a nearby wooden railing and injures himself. The next day Tetsuro invites Kanna to their old playground as kindergarten kids and confesses to her, but she rejects him; and as she runs off to Kaito's place to confess (only to be rejected by Kaito anyway), Tetsuro falls on his knees, where Mio sneaks from behind and hugs him, saying it's all right to cry. The filming of the movie continues, but one day Emika, Ichika's older sister, appears.
11	"Don't Leave, Senpai" "Ikanaide, Senpai." (行かないで、先輩。)	March 19, 2012
Emika is retrieving Ichika because the latter is on a planet where contact with its lifeforms is forbidden under their Federation laws, and the only solution is for her to leave this planet before things get messier. Ichika reluctantly agrees, but changes her mind when Kanna and the others arrive to stop her. Learning certain information from Emika, Remon tells them that Ichika may stay if the earthly spot Ichika has seen in her imagination is found in order to prove a probable previous contact between aliens and human beings. As the group finds the place, the search team arrives and starts a pursuit. Since Rinon's teleport function becomes disabled, Remon takes the others to the spot using a van specially prepared with Emika's help; with Tetsuro, Mio, and Kanna becoming bio-signature decoys for the pursuing rescue craft. However, a few kilometers from the site, the van collides with a cloaked drone from the rescue craft and overturns.
12	"Waiting in the Summer" "Ano Natsu de Matteru." (あの夏で待ってる。)	March 26, 2012
Despite the combined efforts of Tetsuro, Mio, Kanna, Remon (and the van-turned-robot and support from the Men in Black), and even Rinon (with a weapon provided by Emika); and even after seeing the desired location, which Kaito is able to see due to the nanomachines he got from Ichika, the proof they were looking for—a love umbrella carved into a tree by the alien who crash-landed on the place a long time ago—is gone, and the Federation recovery team takes Ichika away. But as a result of such encounter, the memories of the aliens about the distant time when they did arrive at the place were unlocked and become part of the memory for all those involved. As the new school term enters, Kaito's sister Nanami returns from her trip to Bolivia with a gift for Ichika (a traditional Incan vest); Kaito tells her that Ichika's term abroad ended and she went back home. Remon, prior to transferring back to the MIB, leaves Kaito and the others an incomplete version of the film they have made. A few years later, Kaito, Mio, Tetsuro, and Kanna have graduated, but not without completing the unfinished film. During a re-showing at the school festival, Ichika (wearing Nanami's gift) is seen appearing in it.
OVA	"Our last Summer of high school, is spent waiting for that Summer." "Bokutachi wa Kōkō Saigo no Natsu o Sugoshinagara, Ano Natsu o Matte Iru." (僕達は高校最後の夏を過ごしながら、あの夏を待っている。)	August 29, 2014
Tetsuro finds a reel of film at Kaito's house. Kaito remembers it was made as a test film, so everyone could get used to being filmed. Kaito watches the reel showing Ichika being too self-conscious being filmed. Remon gives her an alcoholic drink to get inspiration for the screenplay, which she gets from Ichika's uninhibited behaviour. While Ichika is sleeping off the effects, Remon pours some of the alcoholic drink for Kanna and Mio, resulting in more wild behaviour which Remon films. The test reel finishes and Kanna, Mio and Tetsuro turn up at Kaito's house with fireworks and sparklers. The friends reminiscence about old times.

=== Internet radio show ===
An internet radio show to promote Waiting in the Summer called Ichika to Rinon no Natsu Machi Radio (イチカとりのんのなつまちラジオ, Ichika and Rinon's Waiting for Summer Radio) had a pre-broadcast on December 26, 2011. It ran for 12 weekly broadcasts between January 16 and April 30, 2012. Produced by Hibiki Radio Station, the show was hosted by Haruka Tomatsu (the voice of Ichika Takatsuki) and Rina Hidaka (the voice of Rinon).

=== Print ===
A manga adaptation illustrated by Pepako Dokuta was serialized between the March 2012 and February 2013 issues of ASCII Media Works' Dengeki Daioh magazine. ASCII Media Works released three tankōbon volumes from March 27, 2012, to February 27, 2013. Media Factory published two light novels, written by Ichika Toyogawa with illustrations by Taraku Uon: the first on March 22, 2012, and the second on July 23, 2012. An art book titled The Art of Natsu de Matteru (The Art of あの夏で待ってる) was published by Mitsumura Suiko Shoin on July 18, 2012.

== See also ==
- Please Teacher!
- Please Twins!
