= Double Exposure (1994 film) =

- Directed by: Claudia Hoover
- Written by: Christine Colfer; Bridget Hoffman; Claudia Hoover
- Produced by: Samuel Benedict (producer); Joanne Watkins (producer); Scott Wiseman (executive producer)
- Starring: Ron Perlman; Ian Buchanan; Dedee Pfeiffer
- Cinematography: John J. Connor
- Edited by: Thomas Meshelski
- Music by: Paolo Rustichelli
- Production company: Falcon Arts & Entertainment
- Distributed by: Prism Entertainment Corporation; Hellas Cosmos Video
- Release date: April 16, 1994
- Running time: 93 minutes
- Country: United States
- Language: English

Double Exposure is a 1994 American crime drama, starring Ron Perlman, Ian Buchanan, and Dedee Pfeiffer.

== Plot ==
The Putnams, Roger (Ian Buchanan) and Maria (Jennifer Gatti), continue an unstable marriage. She is unhappy at his obsessiveness and possessiveness, and he continually suspects her of having an affair. On Tuesday and Thursday nights, Maria is allowed out for a gym workout with their mutual friend and his colleague, Linda (Dedee Pfeiffer), but she gets home so late that he presumes she is up to something behind his back. He hires private detective John McClure (Ron Perlman) to find out if she is cheating and with whom. Meanwhile, Linda discovers that Roger has been skimming from the company they work for. McClure brings evidence to Roger that his wife is indeed having an affair. Roger wants Maria's lover killed and asks McClure to help him. McClure requests twenty-five thousand dollars and says that he knows a man who knows a man -but is really planning to do it himself because he's broke and is being blackmailed by an old friend. The plan is screwed up when McClure shoots blindly into the hotel room and shoots Maria instead of her lover. Enter a young homicide investigator (William R. Moses) and a forensic scientist who knows how to analyze a nanogram of dog excrement and human vomit to discover the actual identity of the killers and the lover.

== Cast ==
- Ron Perlman as John McClure
- Ian Buchanan as Roger Putnam
- Dedee Pfeiffer as Linda Mack
- Jennifer Gatti as Maria Putnam
- William R. Moses as Detective Joiner
- James McEachin as Detective Becker
- Bridget Hoffman as Ruby Marlowe

== Production ==
As much as she loved the idea, actually filming a love scene with another woman with a full crew around was a challenge for Dedee Pfeiffer. "We both were really nervous in the sense that it's embarrassing," she said. "What I do with my personal life, whatever, but when it comes to being a professional in front of other people it becomes a whole different dynamic. When you're naked with another woman in front of a bunch of other people at 8 a.m., it's not the most sexy thing."
