= Hiroaki Gōda =

Japanese anime director, screenwriter, animator, and character designer (born 1965)

- Born: March 24, 1965 (age 60); Sapporo, Hokkaidō Prefecture, Japan
- Occupation(s): animator, character designer, screenwriter, director
- Known for: Oh My Goddess! anime adaptions

Hiroaki Gōda (合田 浩章) (born March 24, 1965), is an anime director, screenwriter, animator, and character designer. His most notable contributions as a screenwriter and director include the numerous Oh My Goddess! anime adaptations.

== Works ==
=== Anime ===
- Direction

- Bubblegum Crisis
- Oh My Goddess!
- Ah! My Goddess - The Movie
- Ah! My Goddess TV
- Ah! My Goddess - Flights of Fancy
- Aa! Megami-sama! Tatakau Tsubasa
- Aa! Megami-sama! (2011)

- Character Design

- Please Teacher!
- Please Twins!
- Amagami SS
- Amagami SS Plus
- Love, Elections, & Chocolate
- Bloom Into You

- Chief Animation Direction

- Love, Elections, & Chocolate
- Fantastic Adventure Of Yohko: Leda
- Mujigen Hunter Fandora

- Concept Design
  - Elementalors
- Minor Staff in

- Macron 1 (2)
- Giant Gorg
- Macross - Do You Remember Love
- Dream Hunter Rem
- Fight! Iczer-One
- M.D. Geist
- Bubblegum Crisis
- Dirty Pair Project EDEN
- Metal Skin Panic Madox-01
- Hades Project Zeorymer
- Guardian of Darkness
- Sol Bianca
- Doomed Megalopolis
- Silent Mobius 2
- Oh My Goddess!
- JoJo`s Bizarre Adventure
- Elementalors
- Magical Girl Pretty Sammy
- Neon Genesis Evangelion
- Ah! My Goddess - The Movie
- Hanaukyou Maid Tai
- Please Teacher!
- Please Twins!
- Hanaukyo Maid Team: La Verite
- Le Portrait de Petite Cossette
- Gankutsuou -The Count of Monte Cristo-
- Ah! My Goddess TV
- Ah! My Goddess - Flights of Fancy
- Pumpkin Scissors
- Top o Nerae! (2006)
- My Bride is a Mermaid
- Evangelion: 1.0 You Are (Not) Alone
- Aa! Megami-sama! Tatakau Tsubasa
- Special A
- Ranma 1/2: Akumu! Shunmin Kou
- Evangelion: 2.0 You Can (Not) Advance
- Sasameki Koto
- Amagami SS
- Aa! Megami-sama! (2011)
- Gekijouban Sora no Otoshimono: Tokei Jikake no Angeloid
- Usagi Drop
- Love, Elections, & Chocolate

== Bibliography ==
- The Sketch Book of Hiroaki Gohda (合田浩章スケッチブック). Style, 2022. ISBN 978-4902948455
