= Hiroaki Miura =

Japanese voice actor

- 三浦 祥朗
- Born: March 24, 1977 (age 48); Nagano Prefecture, Japan
- Occupation: Voice actor
- Years active: 1998–present
- Agent: Aoni Production

Hiroaki Miura (三浦 祥朗, Miura Hiroaki; born March 24, 1977) is a Japanese voice actor.

== Filmography ==
=== Anime series ===
- Air Master (Cameraman) (episode 2)
- Beet the Vandel Buster (Thread)
- Bobobo-bo Bo-bobo (Bobopatch (eps 16, 37), Hanpen, Kanransha, Radioman)
- Bleach (Yushima Oko)
- Comic Party (Coach)
- Tiger Mask (Red Death Mask)
- Digimon Fusion (BlueMeramon)
- Dokkoida?! (Matagu Shido) (episode 8)
- Dragon Ball Z Kai (Zarbon)
- Dragon Ball Super (Ganos)
- E's Otherwise (Chris, Rikuo)
- Fairy Musketeers (Dwarf) (episode 28)
- Gate Keepers (Male B)
- Ge Ge Ge no Kitarō (Masayuki (ep 14), Yasunari (ep 64))
- Gin-iro no Olynssis (Yousuke)
- Girls Bravo (Male 2) (episode 7)
- Hatara Kizzu Maihamu Gumi (Mansuke, Fukuda)
- Hataraki Man (Secretary Sakamoto) (episode 1)
- Katanagatari (Mitsubashi Maniwa) (episode 4)
- Kamisama Kazoku (Shinichi Kirishima)
- Kiddy Grade (Chevalier)
- Kin'iro no Corda
- Knight Hunters Eternity (Other voices) (episodes 1, 3, and 5)
- Knights of the Zodiac: Saint Seiya (Cygnus Hyōga)
- Kokoro Library Biker's Friend 2 (episodes 1, 12), Editor C (episode 3)
- Lovege Chu ~Miracle Seiyū Hakusho~ (Aoki Yukia)
- Mermaid Melody: Pichi Pichi Pitch as Announcer (ep 31); Fan A (ep 78); Kengo; Man B (ep 81); Manager (ep 53)
- Nodame Cantabile: Paris (Roman) (episode 10)
- Oban Star-Racers (Prince Aikka)
- One Piece (Absalom, Pirates)
- Please Teacher! (Matagu Shido)
- Please Twins! (Matagu Shido)
- Shiba-wanko no Wa no Kokoro (Papa Youichi)
- Shrine of the Morning Mist (Handsome Boy A) (episode 16)
- Sister Princess: Re Pure (Elder brother)
- Stitch! (Takumi)
- Tokyo Majin (Detective A) (episode 8)
- Tokyo Majin Gakuen Kenpucho: The Second Act (Ryuji Mashiro)
- Weiß Kreuz (Various)
- World Trigger (2014) (Ryō Utagawa)
- Xenosaga: The Animation (Tony)
- Yu-Gi-Oh! (Male student) (episode 13)
- Kado: The Right Answer (Kojiro Shindo)

=== Original video animation ===
- Dai Yamato Zero-go (X-3)
- Please Teacher! (Matagu Shido)
- Please Twins! (Matagu Shido)
- Saint Seiya: The Hades Chapter - Elysion (Cygnus Hyoga)
- Saint Seiya: The Hades Chapter - Inferno (Cygnus Hyoga)

=== Anime films ===
- Kiddy Grade -Truth Dawn- (Chevalier)
- Mobile Suit Gundam: The Movie Trilogy (Boy E)

=== Tokusatsu ===
- Mahou Sentai Magiranger (Gestalt Hades Beastman Chimera) (Ep 33 - 34) (voice of Shizumi Niki and Kohei Fukuhara)

=== Video games ===
- Battle Fantasia (Ashley Loveless)
- Buso Renkin: Welcome to Papillon Park (Soya Muto - Kazuki and Tokiko's son)
- Dragon Shadow Spell (Ra, Werner)
- Dynasty Warriors 3 (Gan Ning)
- Dynasty Warriors 4 (Gan Ning)
- Dynasty Warriors 4: Empires (Edit Officer (Calm Voice))
- Dynasty Warriors 5 (Gan Ning)
- Dynasty Warriors 6 (Gan Ning)
- Dynasty Warriors 7 (Gan Ning, Guan Suo)
- Dynasty Warriors 8 (Gan Ning, Guan Suo)
- Dynasty Warriors: Origins (Gan Ning)
- English Detective Mysteria (Akechi Kenichirou)
- Gate of Nightmares (Vyce)
- GioGio's Bizarre Adventure (Fugo)
- JoJo's Bizarre Adventure: Eyes of Heaven (Joshu Higashikata)
- Mega Man Zero 3 (Blazin' Flizard)
- Rune Factory Frontier (Eric, Wagner)
- Saint Seiya: The Hades (Cygnus Hyoga)
- Saint Seiya Senki (Cygnus Hyoga)
- Shin Megami Tensei: Digital Devil Saga (Cielo)
- Shin Megami Tensei: Digital Devil Saga 2 (Cielo)
- Shining Tears (Piosu)
- Tales of Fandom Vol.1 (Arusa Littleton)
- The Legend of Heroes: Trails in the Sky (Richard Alan)
- Time Crisis 4 (Evan Bernard, Giorgio Bruno)
- Kamen Rider: Climax (Kamen Rider Kaixa)
- Time Crisis 5 (Wild Fang)
- Ultraman Fighting Evolution Rebirth (Pilot)
- Warriors Orochi (Gan Ning)
- Warriors Orochi 2 (Gan Ning)
- Warriors Orochi 3 (Gan Ning, Guan Suo)
- Yggdra Union: We'll Never Fight Alone (Gulcasa)
- Ikémen Sengoku: Romances Across Time (Uesugi Kenshin)
- Kamen Rider Summonride (Kamen Rider Kaixa)

=== Radio Drama ===
- Saint Seiya Ougon 12 Kyu Hen (Cygnus Hyoga)
- Side Story of Tokyo Savage (Tomoe)

=== Drama CD ===
- Persona 3 Character Drama CD Vol. 4 (Hidetoshi Odagiri)
- Endou-kun no Kansetsu Nikki (Tsuda)
- Yoromeki Banchou (Ryo Yoshikawa)

=== Dubbing ===
- Little Bear (Cat)
- Stressed Eric (Brian Feeble)
