= Bridget Hoffman =

American voice actress

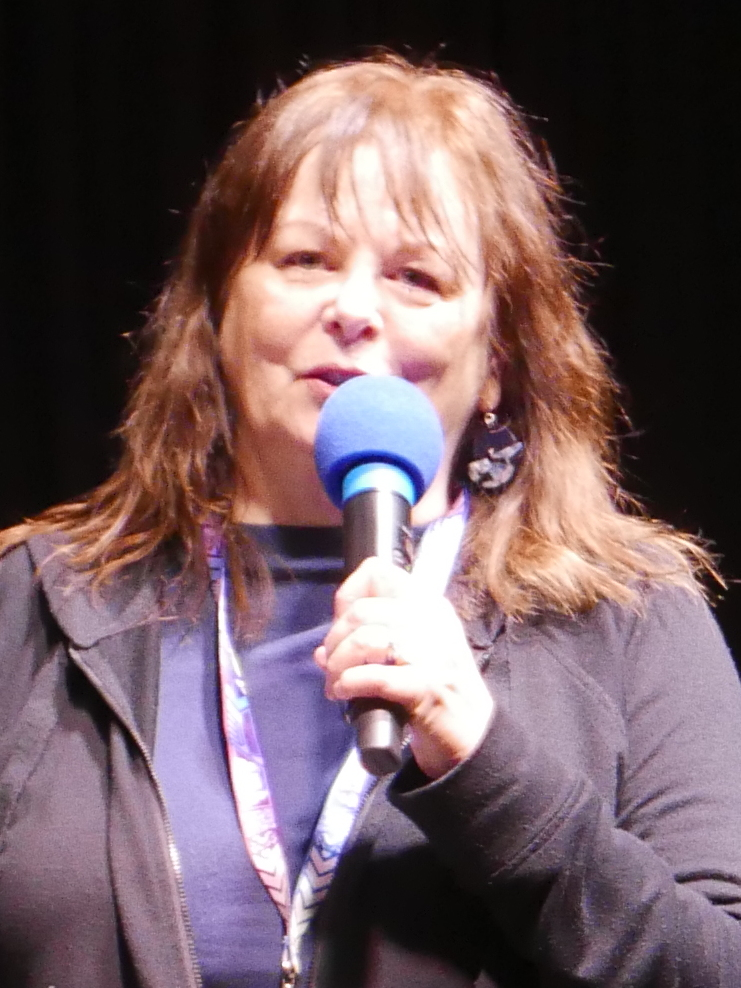
- Hoffman in 2024
- Born: 1961 or 1962 (age 64–65)
- Other names: Ruby Marlowe; Ellen Wilkinson; Ellen Arden; Tessa Ariel
- Education: Michigan State University; Santa Monica College
- Occupations: Voice actress; voice director
- Years active: 1982–present

Bridget Hoffman (born 1961/1962) is an American voice actress, voice director and ADR script writer who has provided voices for a number of English-language versions of Japanese anime films and television series, usually under an alias such as Ruby Marlowe. Prior to her involvement in anime, she had some on-screen acting roles in films and television including Hercules: The Legendary Journeys and other media produced by Sam Raimi. Some of her major voice roles are title characters such as Belldandy in Ah! My Goddess: The Movie, Mizuho Kazami in Please Teacher!/Please Twins!, Mima Kirigoe in Perfect Blue, and Lain Iwakura in Serial Experiments Lain. She also voiced lead ensemble characters as Rune Venus in El Hazard, Miaka Yuki in Fushigi Yûgi, Raquel Casull in Scrapped Princess, Fuu Hououji in Magic Knight Rayearth, Shinobu Maehara in Love Hina, Nia Teppelin in Gurren Lagann, Kanae Kocho in Demon Slayer, Irisviel von Einzbern in Fate/Zero. She served as the ADR director for the Fushigi Yûgi series and films, Ah! My Goddess: The Movie and a series of shorts called The Adventures of Mini-Goddess. She also provides background voices in a number of animated films recorded in the Los Angeles area, including Frozen, Epic, and Cloudy with a Chance of Meatballs 2. In video games, she provides the voice of KOS-MOS in the Xenosaga series as well as Atoli in the .hack//G.U. series.

== Career ==
Hoffman grew up in the Detroit area and graduated from Michigan State. She was a model for the promotional pictures of Sam Raimi's 1981 film The Evil Dead, and has participated in several Josh Becker-directed films and episodes, including Running Time, Cleveland Smith: Bounty Hunter as well as small roles in Raimi's films Crimewave and Darkman. While in Los Angeles, she worked as an actress on a number of plays and also a narrator model for some auto shows. One of her first jobs there was doing a Budweiser commercial with Leon Redbone. She starred alongside Ned Beatty as a historian who time travels with a group of scientists in the 1989 film Time Trackers. She had a starring guest role as Echidna, the Mother of all Monsters, in Raimi's television show Hercules: The Legendary Journeys, and would make other appearances in the series.

Hoffman has been involved in voiceovers for anime titles. Many of her roles have been under an alias such as Ruby Marlowe, which was her character's name in her 1994 film Double Exposure. She worked with Animaze / Pioneer Entertainment on the Fushigi Yugi: The Mysterious Play anime series, where she served as the voice director as well as voice the starring role of Miaka Yuki; the show, along with another Pioneer production El-Hazard, where she voices Rune Venus, would air regularly on the International Channel. Her voice was not warmly received by critics on Anime News Network who disliked her squealing schoolgirl tone, and high pitch, although Mike Dungan of Mania.com find her direction and acting to be entertaining.

She starred as Mima Kirigoe in Perfect Blue, a psychological horror film by Satoshi Kon about a former Japanese idol who tries her hand at acting, but whose life falls apart when she is stalked by an obsessed fan and her associates are murdered one by one. Carlos Ross of THEM Anime Reviews considered the general dub acting as "sophisticated, subtle, and well-done", while Chris Homer of Fandom Post enjoyed both the English and the Japanese versions. On the DVD extra for the film, Hoffman gave a Q&A about her character. She would also voice title character Lain Iwakura in Serial Experiments Lain; she plays a teenager who is deeply involved in the computer network world. Aaron Silver of Anime News Network thought the dubbing was decent but her role as Lain lacked some emotion in comparison with her Japanese voice counterpart.

With the studio Bang Zoom! Entertainment she voiced Fuu Hououji in Magic Knight Rayearth, which was about a trio of junior high students who are transported to a fantasy world. Both Rayearth seasons were dubbed into English. In 2001, she worked with Pioneer (now part of Geneon Entertainment) to ADR direct Ah! My Goddess: The Movie, a feature film in the Oh My Goddess franchise in which she also voiced the title character Belldandy. In a review of the movie, Karen Gellender of Mania.com, who was impressed by Hoffman's previous performances as Mima and Lain, thought the dubbing was a mixed bag, and that her portrayal of Belldandy was the weakest of the bunch, with rather forced acting of emotional dialogue. In contrast, Allen Divers of Anime News Network thought the English cast was suitable and comparable to the Japanese version. Hoffman would later reprise the role of Belldandy in a series of anime shorts called The Adventures of Mini-Goddess, where she also served as its ADR script writer and the ADR director. She would also have a title role as Mizuho Kazami in Please Teacher!, in which she portrays a teacher who marries her student and is actually a space alien, and a title role as Mahoro Andou in Mahoromatic: Automatic Maiden, where she plays an android maid. She also became married to Rif Hutton in 2001.

In the fantasy adventure Scrapped Princess, Hoffman plays Raquel Casull, the older sister of the title character. Theron Martin of Anime News Network describes her character as initially ditzy but becomes sensible and coldly pragmatic, and that her voice was a particularly good fit, and a dead-on portrayal. Hoffman would voice high school student Shinobu Maehara in the Love Hina romantic comedy series, and supporting character Ryoko Asakura in Bang Zoom!'s dubbing of The Melancholy of Haruhi Suzumiya series. She had recurring roles in the related anime series Lucky Star where she plays Inori Hiiragi, the eldest sister of the Hiiragi family, and Yukari Takara who is Miyuki's mother.

Hoffman would continue voice acting in the 2010s. In 2013, she voiced Irisviel von Einzbern in Fate/Zero, a prequel to the Fate/stay night series. Outside of anime productions, Hoffman has been involved in a number of animated films, including Frozen and Tangled, where she participates in background voices (ADR loop groups or Additional Voices). In 2012, she was a panelist in the SAG Foundation's Voice-Over Summit held in the Los Angeles area where she discussed ADR, Voice Matching, and Voice Replacement. She voices in video game series, including .hack//G.U. where she voices Atoli, and Xenosaga where she voices KOS-MOS in Xenosaga Episode III: Also sprach Zarathustra. She also continues to act in local theatre productions.

== Filmography ==
=== Anime ===
- Adventures of Mini-Goddess – Belldandy (as Ruby Marlowe)
- Bastard!! – The Princess Sheila (as Tessa Ariel)
- Battle Athletes Victory – Anna Respighi, Ling-pha Wong (as Ruby Marlowe)
- Chobits – Chitose Hibiya (as Ellen Wilkinson)
- Demon Slayer: Kimetsu no Yaiba - Rui's mother, Kanae Kocho
- Digimon Frontier – Patamon, Nefertimon
- Digimon Tamers – Jeri Katou, D-Reaper, Mrs. Katou
- Durarara!! – Namie Yagiri
- Durarara!!×2 – Namie Yagiri, Kururi Orihara
- El Hazard – Rune Venus, Fatora Venus (as Tessa Ariel)
- Eureka Seven – Sonia Wakabayashi
- Fate/Zero – Irisviel von Einzbern
- Fushigi Yûgi – Miaka Yuki
- Gate Keepers – Fen Fei-Ling (as Ruby Marlowe)
- Gatekeepers 21 – Chinami Watanabe (as Ruby Marlowe)
- Gurren Lagann – Nia Teppelin (Ep. 17–27)
- Hand Maid May – Cyberdoll Kei
- Love Hina – Shinobu Maehara (as Ellen Arden)
- Lucky ☆ Star – Inori Hiiragi, Yukari Takara
- Magic Knight Rayearth – Fuu Hououji
- Mahoromatic series – Mahoro Andou (as Ellen Wilkinson)
- Mars Daybreak – Selena Knightley (Ep. 13)
- The Melancholy of Haruhi Suzumiya – Ryoko Asakura
- Please Teacher! / Please Twins! – Mizuho Kazami
- Saber Marionette J Again – Cherry (as Ruby Marlowe)
- Scrapped Princess – Raquel Casull
- Serial Experiments Lain – Lain Iwakura (as Ruby Marlowe)
- Strait Jacket – Nerin Simmons – direct-to-video as film, broadcast on SciFi channel
- Trigun – Rem Saverem (as Ruby Marlowe)
- Vandread series – Ezra Vieil (as Ellen Wilkinson)
- Wolf's Rain – Cole (Eps. 5–6)
- X – Princess Hinoto

=== Films ===
==== Feature films ====
- Big Hero 6 – Additional Voices
- Cloudy with a Chance of Meatballs 2 – Young Flint
- Epic – Additional Voices
- Frozen – Additional Voices
- Hoodwinked Too! Hood vs. Evil – Additional Voices
- Hotel Transylvania – Additional Voices
- Hotel Transylvania 2 – Additional Voices
- Legends of Oz: Dorothy's Return – Additional Voices
- Madagascar 2: Escape to Africa – Female Tourist
- Monsters vs Aliens – Girl Screaming in the Car
- ParaNorman – Crystal, Parachutist Ghost, Librarian
- Resident Evil: Vendetta – Additional Voices
- Spirit Untamed - Young Lucky
- The Princess and the Frog – Additional Voices
- Tangled – Additional Voices
- Total Recall (2012 film) – Chopper Voice

==== Direct-to-video and television films ====
- Ah! My Goddess: The Movie – Belldandy (as Ruby Marlowe)
- DreamWorks Dragons: Gift of the Night Fury – Female Viking
- Naruto the Movie: Guardians of the Crescent Moon Kingdom – Amayo (as Voice Cast)
- Perfect Blue – Mima Kirigoe (as Ruby Marlowe)
- Tugger: The Jeep 4x4 Who Wanted to Fly – Lucy
- The Castle of Cagliostro – Lady Clarisse d'Cagliostro (as Ruby Marlowe, Animaze/Manga dub)
- The Disappearance of Haruhi Suzumiya – Ryoko Asakura
- The Disappearance of Nagato Yuki-chan – Ryoko Asakura

=== Live action ===
- Army of Darkness (1992) – Swordfighter
- Ash vs. Evil Dead (2015) – Little Lori (episode "El Jefe")
- Caprica – Newswoman (episode "Retribution")
- Cleveland Smith: Bounty Hunter (1982) – Native
- Crimewave (1985) – Nun
- Darkman (1990) – Computer Voice
- Double Exposure (1994) – Ruby Marlowe
- Drag Me To Hell (2009) – Ghost at Seance
- ER – Mrs. Bradley (episode "Let the Games Begin")
- Eureka – Computer Voice (multiple episodes including "Shower the People" and "You Don't Know Jack")
- Hercules: The Legendary Journeys – Echidna (episodes "The Mother of All Monsters", "Cast a Giant Shadow", and "Monster Child in the Promised Land")
- Red Lights (2012) – Radio Duo Female Voice
- Running Time (1997) – Receptionist
- Space Case (1992) - Elizabeth
- The Taking of Flight 847: The Uli Derickson Story (1988 TV film) – Mrs. Panos
- Time Trackers (1989) – Madeline Hart
- Total Recall (2012) – Chopper Voice
- Veronica Mars (2005) – Ellen Sinclair (episode "Silence of the Lamb")

=== Video games ===
- .hack//G.U. vol.1//Rebirth – Atoli, Michiru Tajima
- .hack//G.U. vol.2//Reminisce – Atoli, Michiru Tajima
- .hack//G.U. vol.3//Redemption – Atoli, Michiru Tajima
- .hack//G.U. Last Recode – Atoli
- The Bouncer – Dominique Cross (as Ruby Marlowe)
- Demon Slayer: Kimetsu no Yaiba – The Hinokami Chronicles – Rui's Mother
- Hunter: The Reckoning – Samantha Alexander (as Ruby Marlowe)
- Lego Batman 2: DC Super Heroes – Voice-over actors
- Silent Bomber – Micino Tifone (as Ruby Marlowe)
- Soldier of Fortune – Voice Talent
- Xenosaga Episode III: Also sprach Zarathustra – KOS-MOS, T-elos

== Staff work ==
=== Writer ===
- Double Exposure (1994)
- The Outsider (1994 film by Grainger Hines)

=== ADR/Voice director ===
- Ah! My Goddess: The Movie
- The Adventures of Mini-Goddess
- Fushigi Yûgi
- Saber Marionette J Again
- The Legend of Drunken Master – Voice Talent, Jackie Chan's Dialogue Coach

=== ADR script writer ===
- The Adventures of Mini-Goddess
- Fushigi Yūgi
