= Please Teacher! =

2002 science fiction anime television series

- Onegai Teacher Vol 1 DVD cover featuring Mizuho Kazami

おねがい☆ティーチャー (Onegai ☆ Tīchā)
- Genre: Romantic comedy; Science fiction
- Anime television series
- Directed by: Yasunori Ide
- Written by: Yōsuke Kuroda
- Music by: Kazuya Takase; Shinji Orito; Tomoyuki Nakazawa
- Studio: Daume
- Licensed by: NA: Nozomi Entertainment
- Original network: Animax, WOWOW, Bandai Channel
- English network: SEA: Animax Asia
- Original run: January 10, 2002 – March 28, 2002
- Episodes: 12
- Original video animation
- Directed by: Yasunori Ide
- Music by: Shinji Orito
- Studio: Daume
- Licensed by: NA: Nozomi Entertainment
- Released: October 25, 2002
- Runtime: 21 minutes
- Manga

Onegai Teacher
- Written by: Shizuru Hayashiya
- Published by: MediaWorks
- English publisher: NA: ComicsOne
- Magazine: Dengeki Daioh
- Original run: January 2002 – February 2003
- Volumes: 2
- Light novel

Onegai Teacher: Mizuho and Kei's Milky Diary
- Written by: Gō Zappa
- Illustrated by: Taraku Uon; Hiroaki Gōda
- Published by: MediaWorks
- English publisher: NA: ComicsOne
- Imprint: Dengeki Bunko
- Published: March 2003
- Sequel
- Please Twins!

Please Teacher! (Japanese: おねがい☆ティーチャー, Hepburn: Onegai Tīchā; Onegai ☆ Teacher) is a 2002 science fiction and romantic comedy anime television series directed by Yasunori Ide, written by Yōsuke Kuroda, and produced by Bandai Visual. It was later adapted into a manga and light novel and centers on a group of friends and the odd things that happen to them after they get a new teacher.

The Please Teacher! anime series premiered in Japan on the WOWOW satellite television network between January 10 and March 28, 2002, spanning a total of 13 episodes, including twelve originally premiering on television plus an OVA episode released on DVD on October 25, 2002. It was adapted very soon into a manga, serialized in MediaWorks's shōnen manga magazine, Dengeki Daioh, in January 2002, and was also later adapted into a light novel, entitled Onegai Teacher: Mizuho and Kei's Milky Diary, published in March 2003.

The Please Teacher! anime series was soon continued with a spin-off sequel, Please Twins!, which premiered on WOWOW between July 15 and October 14, 2003.

The setting of the series, though left unsaid in either anime or manga, is Lake Kizaki, located in Nagano, Japan, and the region and its surrounding locations are featured prominently and accurately across the series. The novel states that the school the characters attend is the Nagano Prefectural Kizaki High School. This school is based upon the Old Matsumoto High School located in Agatanomori Park of Matsumoto, about an hour south of Lake Kizaki on the JR Ōito Line. The tower on which Kaede and Hyosuke stand upon can be found in Joyama Park on the northwest part of the city.

== Plot ==
Please Teacher! is a story mainly revolving around a tight-knit group of friends in high school and how they cope with several life-changing events that are never too far off from intimate relationships. The main character is a boy named Kei Kusanagi who has a very rare disease which causes a comatose state referred to as a "standstill" whenever he is under severe emotional distress.

Before the beginning of the story, Kei, at 15 years of age, had fallen into a "standstill" lasting three years after witnessing the suicide of his elder sister. After recovering, he quietly moved away from home in order to avoid social difficulty due to his long absence, and began living with his uncle, a medical doctor, and aunt. Due to the strange nature of how he came to live there, Kei wanted to keep the situation a secret from his new friends for fear of being ostracized as being too old to associate with them. After Kei had established himself in his new surroundings and had entered into a close group of mutually supportive friends, a Galactic Federation starship had entered Earth's atmosphere stealthily, approached Honshū Island and landed surreptitiously in Lake Kizaki.

The story begins with Kei suffering a minor 'standstill' while in the vicinity of the lake, witnessing several unexplainable phenomena happening there, and then watching as a beautiful half-human alien named Mizuho Kazami materialize beside the shore. Kazami was sent to observe planet Earth by a seemingly benevolent Galactic Federation in order to prevent humans from making developmental mistakes. Kei, upon observing the materialization, attempts to escape the pursuing Kazami. Kazami is under strict orders to prevent her true identity and mission from being discovered. During his attempt to escape, Kei falls into the lake. Kazami rescues Kei and, using information from his identification, is able to return him home in secret. The next day, Kazami has become Kei's new homeroom teacher and next-door neighbor.

During assisting her in moving in, Kei suffers another standstill, and while in a weakened state explains his predicament to the compassionate Mizuho, who ends up revealing her own origins and purpose on Earth. Several accidental activations of Mizuho's teleport technology (which were inadvertently caused by Kei) eventually place Kei and Mizuho in a couple of compromising situations in front of his uncle and aunt and his school's headmaster, but Kei protects Mizuho from charges for an inappropriate relationship between student and teacher by impulsively stating that they are married, resulting in an actual civil marriage that later blossoms into genuine affection for each other. The headmaster relents, partly because he, too, had married a former student younger than himself and can understand their situation personally. Both are allowed to stay so long as they do not reveal their status to the other students, and do not engage in any public displays of affection.

The remainder of the series concerns the budding intimate relationships between the close friends, one of whom (Koishi Herikawa) is romantically interested in Kei, and another (Ichigo Morino) who has suffered even greater loss of time from the same disease as he has; the problems of having to maintain the secrecy of the marriage; an interfering parent and sibling visiting from the Galaxy Federation; and Kei learning to overcome the ever-present threat of another lengthy 'standstill' stealing more of his life, particularly as he has fallen deeply in love with Mizuho and desperately wants to remain with her.

Eventually Kei falls into another major "standstill" and in order to bring him out of it, Mizuho has to use her technology which is against the law. As a result, her status on Earth is revoked, she is banned from the planet and all memory of her is erased from everyone's, including Kei's, minds. With the help of her mother and sister she sneaks back and is devastated to learn that Kei, who she is deeply in love with, has no memory of her. While helping her move back in, Kei reveals that his memory has returned and the two express their love for each other and get married again.

== Characters ==
Kei Kusanagi (草薙 桂, Kusanagi Kei)
Voiced by: Sōichirō Hoshi (Japanese); Dave Wittenberg (English)
Kei is an 18-year-old who retains a 15-year-old body after a three-year-long "standstill", which is a coma-like state that occurs during a time of extreme emotional distress. Standstills are derived from an unknown, possibly psychological, disease that Kei and his friend Ichigo Morino have. He tends to be a very frail and shy boy, not often wanting to assert himself when need be.

After observing the landing of a UFO while on the bank of the nearby lake and subsequently observing the alien on the lake shore, odd things begin happening to Kei in connection with this alien. The next day, Kei is surprised to find, like everyone else, that one of their teachers quit and a quick replacement was found which just happened to turn out to be the alien — Mizuho Kazami. After a few more encounters with each other, Kei is taken to her spaceship where the whole situation goes from bad to worse. Upon striking Marie, a tiny computer helper of Mizuho's, it effectively is unable to perform as well as it seemed to work, which often puts the characters in strange situations if they cannot rely on the help of Marie.

Eventually, after Kei and Mizuho are found in a locked storage room by Kei's uncle and the principal of the school, his uncle impulsively tells the principal that Kei and Mizuho are married. Later, Kei and Mizuho do get married, though only the paperwork is done while there was no official ceremony. This whole situation is kept secret from Kei's friends as Ichigo Morino constantly tries to pair Kei up with a friend of hers, Koishi, and all the while Kei and Mizuho's relationship and attraction for each other only grows. Kei also appears occasionally in the sequel Please Twins!, but as cameos.

Mizuho Kazami (風見 みずほ, Kazami Mizuho)
Voiced by: Kikuko Inoue (Japanese); Bridget Hoffman (English)
Mizuho is a 23-year-old half-Earthling who is visually indiscernible from a regular human being. She is very attractive, which, while garnering the attention of the various male characters in the show, does serve to protect her secret. She comes to Earth to monitor the planet, but inadvertently she was seen by Kei just as she was landing. This leads to a catastrophic set of events that while nearly killing them both leads to a bond materializing between Kei and Mizuho. Although she did not trust him at first, she started to become attracted to Kei and eventually falls in love with him after they shared secrets about their past with one another. In a conversation with Mizuho's younger sister Maho, Kei learns that she is the youngest member of the GF Observers ever to gain a license. She is stripped of her surveyor status in episode twelve after violating several key tenets of GF Law in order to save Kei. Also from Maho we learn that Mizuho apparently has never had a romantic relationship, which is verified when she admits as much to Kei.

One of the main conflicts in the story involves Mizuho and how she tends to have great jealousy and misjudgment. While she underwent training prior to her arrival of Japanese and Earth history and customs, she was ill-prepared for dealing with the social interactions of adolescents. This trouble is further compounded by her initial, almost childlike, lack of understanding of romance. She even went to such great lengths as to spy on Kei while he was hanging out with a friend from school, Koishi Herikawa, in a set-up date. She does eventually realize her feelings for Kei once they begin living together and, at later points of the series, shows restraint and maturity that she at other times lacks. Mizuho's character can almost be thought of as two personalities. The first of a well-mannered school teacher who is soft spoken and kind. The other, seen mostly with Kei and the Edajima's is more outgoing, opinionated, and even violent on some occasions. This last point can be illustrated by the events of episode 13 where Mizuho's mother held Kei hostage in a love hotel.

She loves to eat Pochy, a Japanese snack food that consists of a biscuit stick covered with chocolate. She eats Pochy because it reminds her of her dead father; an empty box of Pochy was all Mizuho has left of him. Her mother and sister are also seen eating it in several episodes. Pochy is a fictional version of an actual snack known as Pocky. Her catch phrase is "Saiyūsen jikō yo!" ("This is a priority one!"). She also appears as a regular character in the same school in the sequel series Please Twins!

Koishi Herikawa (縁川 小石, Herikawa Koishi)
Voiced by: Ayako Kawasumi (Japanese); Michelle Ruff (English)
She is one of Kei's close friends who also pursues a romantic relationship with Kei. Her parents own a grocery store and she often has to go to deliver food that people ordered.

Koishi has a happy-disposition to her personality and is only ever seen crying when it comes to matters that involve Kei. In time, she discovers that Kei has already committed his heart to someone else, and eventually grows close to her teacher Yamada, with whom she is eventually implied to have entered a romantic relationship on her own in episode 13. Also briefly appears as a cameo in Please Twins!

Ichigo Morino (森野 苺, Morino Ichigo)
Voiced by: Yukari Tamura (Japanese); Julie Ann Taylor (English)
An evidently shrewd young woman who is seemingly wise beyond her (apparent) years, and who associates with very few friends. Surprisingly, even though she resembles a diminutive 15-year-old or perhaps younger, her real age is 21; her physical development was stunted due to her "standstills", in the same way that they affect Kei. She had been in a "standstill" for 6 years. Ichigo's loss of time and her sense of life cruelly having passed her by due to the illness (she wistfully reveals to Kei that she has a younger sister who is now married and expecting a child) tends to cause her to have a much more cynical and serious demeanor than is normal for someone of her seeming age, which is sometimes commented upon by her (much younger) friends.

Her keen mind causes her to suspect the too-often 'coincidences' regarding their former teacher's departure, the new one's arrival and strange events in their neighborhood immediately after that to be connected, but her much younger and guile-less friends dismiss those connections. She also features in the sequel Please Twins! as a regular character, but with a much more mischievous behavior as class president and resembling a dictator, in fact the Morino's attitude from "Please Teacher" is completely opposite from "Please Twins" seeming that she chose (thanks to Kei) to enjoy her live to the fullest even after the 6 years she lost, the first time she shows that mischievous behaviour is in the after-credits scene of the OVA where she reveals Kei's relationships with Mizuho, Hatsuho, and Maho.

Kaede Misumi (水澄 楓, Misumi Kaede)
Voiced by: Sayaka Ohara (Japanese); Melissa Fahn (English)
Also one of Kei's friends, Kaede tends to be a rather shy girl most of the time. Her physical characteristics include that she is one quarter Irish, tall (for a Japanese) and with red hair and freckles. Despite her shyness, during an accidental visit to her hotel room by a sleep-deprived Hyosuke, in which he mistakenly climbed into her bed, she awoke from a lightly inebriated slumber and claimed that he had appeared to her in a dream which now seems to have come true. She then sweetly confesses her love for him and proceeds to seduce him. The two become inseparable and are seen together throughout the series, to the point of being seen exiting a love hotel together in the OVA. Kaede also features in Please Twins! briefly.

Hyosuke Magumo (間雲 漂介, Magumo Hyōsuke)
Voiced by: Mitsuo Iwata (Japanese); Kirk Thornton (English)
Hyosuke aspires to attend college at Tokyo University and become a professional statesman, much like his brother. Hyousuke's demeanor is initially that of a shallow attention-seeker. Despite his negative attitude, he is a hard worker even impressing his friend by his high scores.
He gets very confused after Kaede (half awake believing Hyosuke being a dream) sweetly confessed to him, he overcame that confusion thanks to Kei setting a meeting with her, unbeknown to him and even angering him to the point of almost hitting Kei, he manages to cool down himself in time and grants that his friend actually is doing the best for him, and he manages to talk to Kaede and after a minor hesitation they both proceed to start a relationship.
After he becomes romantically involved with Kaede, a deeper and much more sensitive and reflective side is revealed. Kaede confirms to Ichigo and Koishi that the private Hyosuke is actually a very different person; of him, she says "He's a gentleman and he's sweet." Of Kei's group of friends, he tends to be the most hyperactive of them all and often does the strangest things too. Hyosuke also appears in Please Twins! briefly.

Matagu Shido (四道 跨, Shidō Matagu)
Voiced by: Hiroaki Miura (Japanese); Tony Schnur (English)
A rather serious student who is also into astronomy, Matagu seems to be the most hopeless of the cast, a classic 'nerd', never even getting to the point of gaining a girlfriend by the end of the series. He is much less confident and self-assured than Hyosuke, or even Kei, leading one to conclude that he suffers from crippling shyness. His stated fondest dream is to meet with 'an alien creature from outer space', totally unaware of the fact that his teacher certainly qualifies as such, and that he has had several conversations with his life's dream in a very normal setting. He even considered to confess his love to her, but his shyness put a halt to his plans. Matagu appears as a common comic relief character in Please Twins! He is portrayed as a pervert when his sister is around, who only appears in Please Twins!.

Minoru Edajima (江田島 みのる, Edajima Minoru)
Voiced by: Naoya Uchida (Japanese); Michael McConnohie (English)
Kei's uncle and doctor of the local clinic. Minoru is something of a lecherous rogue, continually making wolfish comments regarding the attractiveness of passing women. He even does within earshot of his wife, who often retaliates with a measured degree of physical violence. He is openly jealous of Kei's relationship with Mizuho and is more than a little perverted (in the Japanese sense of the word). Despite this, he often covers for and helps Kei and Mizuho out, such as moving Kei's possessions into the married couple's new apartment, purchasing a proper wedding ring for their private ceremony, and paying for an expensive hotel in Okinawa for their honeymoon.

Konoha Edajima (江田島 このは, Edajima Konoha)
Voiced by: Rei Sakuma (Japanese); Karen Strassman (English)
Kei's aunt and nurse of the local clinic. A warm, kind-hearted and quite attractive woman who puts up with her husband's behavior only so much before she starts to get really angry at him. It is evident that she is the more mature member of their pair, and is quite able to curb Minoru's wayward eye and lecherous comments with a significant look or gesture. She is not above using a small degree of force to cause her husband to 'heel' if his behavior gets too outrageous. She seems very sexually amorous towards her husband and loves him deeply. She is very supportive of Kei and Mizuho's relationship, backing Minoru's initial lie to the Headmaster about the couple being married, and then providing a second-hand wedding dress for Mizuho to wear in a private ceremony with only her, Mizuho, Kei and Minoru present.

Marie (まりえ)
Voiced by: Tomoko Kaneda (Japanese); Sandy Fox (English)
A quasi-organic master control program for Mizuho's ship. Totally self-repairing and maintenance free. Hovers around in an inner tube and on occasion plays a miniature guitar. Due to Kei fearfully striking 'him' during an initial escape attempt when Mizuho revealed her true identity, Marie's programming became scrambled, endangering both Kei and Mizuho. Communicating partly through indistinct sounds and through gestures, Marie is essentially a portable link to the ship's operating system. But 'he' is also capable of emotion, as witnessed by the romantic relationship formed between 'himself' and Miruru and his sorrow at their parting. Additionally, in the OVA they are implied to have sex, and both of them become embarrassed when they see others display affection. The implication provided in the series 'extras' is that Marie and Miruru are but extensions of the ships themselves, and thus are the ships. Marie also appears in Please Twins!, often eating a different brand from Pochy, called "Prech".

Masaomi Yamada (山田 正臣, Yamada Masaomi)
Voiced by: Tomokazu Sugita (Japanese); Tony Oliver (English)
A quiet and shaggy male teacher whose hobby is creating human-powered planes (one of which flies successfully in the final episode, earning him a trophy). At first he appears to be something of a physically developed nerd, obsessed with his hobby. Koishi delivers him meals from her parents' grocery store, and eventually both of them grow close; in episode 13 it is implied that they actually may have entered a romantic (and sexual) relationship. He trimmed his hair after Koishi states that he would be handsome if would do so, he forgets this after Mizuho gets forcefully removed from everyone memories after she is stripped of her rank still he remains his new neat look. Yamada appears occasionally in Please Twins!

Maho Kazami (風見 まほ, Kazami Maho)
Voiced by: Satomi Koorogi (Japanese); Sandy Fox (English)
Mizuho's little sister, who disapproves of Kei but eventually comes to accept him. Initially, she is incensed that a member of the powerful Galactic Federation's elite Observers (which it is revealed that Mizuho has the honor of being its youngest member) would stoop to marry such an evident primitive (conveniently overlooking the fact that she is ostensibly the product of just such a union, claiming that the only time that she had ever seen Mizuho cry was when their father died; the implication of wildly different growth rates between alien and human are suggested here, as Maho is much younger-looking than Mizuho and Mizuho had stated that she could barely recall her father's appearance). Maho even attempts to use Miruru to hurt Kei. During the process, she learns just how deeply Kei loves Mizuho and vice versa, and she relents, and later actually shows him a degree of affection with a stolen kiss, but she still possesses a playfully devious nature and is not above blackmailing Kei with videos of intercourse between him and Mizuho to get what she wants.
Hatsuho even states that Maho is in love with Kei as she possibly look him like the ideal boyfriend.

Hatsuho Kazami (風見 はつほ, Kazami Hatsuho)
Voiced by: Yumi Takada (Japanese); Wendee Lee (English)
Mizuho's and Maho's widowed mother, who is very fond of Kei. She is a self-assured, bold but subtly assertive woman. She is not above playfully teasing her oldest daughter and son-in-law, demanding to know intimate details regarding their relationship. She greatly resembles Mizuho, with the exception of having purplish hair instead of pink, green eyes and a small beauty mark on her chin.

Shirou Kazami (風見 士郎, Kazami Shirō)
Mizuho's, Maho's father, Hatsuho's late husband, and a Japanese astronaut; no image of him has ever been seen in the series. The 2009 Mars expedition ship he was a crew member of was presumed lost in space. However, a GF vessel rescued the crew, but the (never verified) implication was that he was not allowed to return to Earth. One of the crew of the GF spacecraft that rescued the Mars expedition was Hatsuho, which is how they came to meet and be married. Unable (or unwilling) to return to Earth, possibly due to the Federation's strict laws governing contact with non-incorporated races, he remained in Federation space and raised a family there. The assumption is that he had attained citizenship, either through marriage or through naturalization, and at that point may have been abjured from returning. Eventually, he went on to develop a planetary contact program for Earth for the Galactic Federation. He died when Mizuho was still a child. The only thing of Earth that he had left behind had been an empty box of Pochy, which Mizuho had treasured.

Miruru (みるる)
Voiced by: Michelle Ruff
Another computer intelligence hologram and Maho's sister, dressed in female-like clothing. The implication is that both Marie and Miruru are in fact commlinks for the ships, themselves. In other words, the ships house self-aware AIs capable of emotions, which are reflected in the actions of the two miniature beings. Seems also to be romantically involved with Marie. Like her counterpart, Miruru lacks human language, instead she utters "Miru" at random opposing to Marie's high-pitched shriek-like cries.

Kozue Kusanagi (草薙 こずえ, Kusanagi Kozue)
Voiced by: Omi Minami (Japanese); Julie Anne Taylor (English)
Kei Kusanagi's elder sister. In a flashback which is shown during a critical 'standstill', it is revealed that Kozue was a very bright, though possibly mentally disturbed, girl who felt that human emotions were the cause of much suffering in the world, and sought to escape them by committing suicide, which Kei had the misfortune of witnessing. The trauma of having done so and the guilt that he had felt at being unable to prevent it led to his first 'standstill'.

Nat
Voiced by: Chinami Nishimura (Japanese); Wendee Lee (English)
Known as the little girl during the summer who finds a boy (Kei in this anime, Maiku in Please Twins!) who she quickly becomes attracted to. Soon after, she finds out the person she falls in love with already has a love interest. Her dog is then pulled on the neck by the leash when she staggers away broken-hearted. She also appears in Please Twins!

== Media ==
=== Anime ===
The Please Teacher! anime series, authored and scripted by Yōsuke Kuroda, directed by Yasunori Ide, and produced by Bandai Visual, Studio Orphee and Daume, originally premiered in Japan on the satellite television network WOWOW, between January 10 and March 28, 2002, spanning a total of thirteen episodes, including twelve originally premiering on television plus an OVA episode concluding the series, released on DVD on October 25, 2002.

It has also been broadcast across Japan by the anime satellite television network, Animax, who have aired the series across its respective networks worldwide, including East Asia, Latin America, and as well as its English language networks in Southeast Asia and South Asia. The series has been licensed for North American distribution by Bandai's distributive unit across the region, Bandai Entertainment, who have released the series via a four-volume DVD release, and whose English dub has also been broadcast by Animax across its English-language networks in Southeast Asia and South Asia. The series is now licensed by Right Stuf under their Nozomi Entertainment label.

The Please Teacher! anime series was soon continued with a spinoff, Please Twins!, which premiered on WOWOW between July 15 and October 14, 2003, featuring many of the characters featured in the series, as the series' story happens after Please Teacher!.

The series' opening theme is "Shooting Star" by Kotoko, and the ending theme is "Sora no Mori de" (空の森で, In the Forest of the Sky) by Mami Kawada. The song "Sora wa Kataranai" (そらは語らない) by Kikuko Inoue is used as an insert song in episode 11, and the song "Love a Riddle" by Kotoko is used as the ending theme in episode 12.

An official AMV of the series was released as "Snow Angel", the music is from the entry #6 of Kotoko's album "Stokesia".

No.	Title	Original release date
1	"Teach Me, Teacher" "Oshiete Tīchā" (教えてティーチャー)	January 10, 2002
While out walking on the lakeshore, Kei witnesses a UFO landing. A female alien materializes and he panics as a result. Kei attempts, rather poorly, to escape from her, falling into the lake and nearly drowning but the alien saves him. The next day, he is surprised to find that the alien is his new homeroom teacher, Mizuho Kazami, and later that day he also discovers that she's his new neighbor.
2	"I Can't Get Married Anymore" "Mō Omuko ni Ikemasen" (もう、お婿にいけません)	January 17, 2002
After being teleported into the gym closet for a much needed talk, Kei and Mizuho are stuck when the door is locked. While they are trapped, Kei and Mizuho share their secrets and begin to fall in love. Later, they are freed by Kei's uncle and the principal. In an attempt to save Mizuho's job, Kei's uncle lies to the principal, saying that Kei and Mizuho are married.
3	"This Isn't Right, Teacher" "Mazui yo Sensei" (まずいよ★先生)	January 24, 2002
Kei and Mizuho get married, but during the ceremony Kei's friends show up for an unexpected visit. Kei must avoid being discovered, and a series of close encounters ensues.
4	"Actually, I Think I Love You" "Yappari Suki ka mo" (やっぱり好きかも)	January 31, 2002
Kei and Koishi get set up on a date by Ichigo. A worried and jealous Mizuho finds out and decides to follow them. Kei must be attentive to Koishi and try to hide his marriage, while contending with an emotional wife.
5	"For That, Teacher, I..." "Sonna Sensei ni, Boku wa" (そんな先生に、ぼくは)	February 7, 2002
Kei and Mizuho go to the beach and stay at a hotel for their honeymoon. When they first arrive, a little girl with a dog falls in love with Kei the moment she sees him but is heartbroken to see he is with Mizuho. The honeymoon begin to go horribly wrong when Kei's friends are discovered to be staying at the same hotel forcing Kei and Mizuho to take steps to hide their relationship from them. In other relationship news, Kaede and Hyosuke progress beyond friendship by becoming intimate for the first time. In the end, Kei and Mizuho are able to come together but are interrupted by the little girl from the beginning of the episode running away in tears. Mizuho gets angry thinking that Kei has been cheating on her with other girls and storms off. Kei chases after her trying to explain to her he was not with other women and does not know what is going on.
6	"Let's Start From The Beginning" "Hajimatte kara Hajimeyō" (始まってから始めよう)	February 14, 2002
Kei and Mizuho receive an unexpected and awkward visit from Mizuho's flirty mother, who intends on exciting their marriage, and her annoying little sister, who is intent on separating the couple by whatever means necessary.
7	"Don't Cry, Teacher" "Nakanaide Sensei" (泣かないで先生)	February 21, 2002
Mizuho's sister, Maho, sees what she thinks to be Kei making Mizuho cry so she tries to get rid of Kei. Due to Maho's interference, Kei falls into a standstill upon hearing that Mizuho would be happier without him. Fortunately, Mizuho arrives in time to call him back. Shortly after, mother and daughter say their farewells, but Maho drops by the apartment, pretending to have forgotten something. After kissing Kei on the cheek to make up for her earlier actions, Maho disappears, leaving Mizuho crying over the fact that Kei "kissed" her little sister. Kei tries to explain that Maho kissed him but instead he seizes the opportunity to kiss Mizuho.
8	"Long Night" "Nagai Yoru" (長い夜)	February 28, 2002
Mizuho and Kei get into an argument. Kei meets Koishi as he wanders around thinking about the argument. Later that day Koishi confesses her love for Kei and is rejected. She walks home in tears.
9	"Let's End It Now" "Mō Owari ni Shiyō" (もう、おわりにしよう)	March 7, 2002
Ichigo finds out that Kei rejected Koishi and tries to confront him but falls into a standstill thus revealing her secret to Kei. He leaves Mizuho to go on date with Koishi so that Ichigo does not fall into a standstill again.
10	"But" "Demo" (でも)	March 14, 2002
Koishi finds Kei talking with Ichigo, and realizes that Ichigo set everything up. She then runs off crying. Koishi wants Kei to kiss her to prove that it was not a set-up. Kei tries to kiss her but is interrupted by Mizuho, who runs away with tears in her eyes. Kei catches up to her and they kiss but Kei falls into a serious standstill.
11	"Teacher" "Sensei" (せんせい)	March 21, 2002
Kei has fallen into a serious standstill and Mizuho tries to help him out of it. We find out that the reason Kei experiences standstills is due to the trauma of witnessing his sister's suicide and hearing her last words, "I want to bring it all to a standstill."
12	"One More Time, Teacher" "Mō Ichido Tīchā" (もう一度ティーチャー)	March 28, 2002
Mizuho is sent back to her planet, where she is stripped of her rank in addition to other sanctions, but her love for Kei prompts her to return to Earth (with help from her mother and sister). A year has passed and the memories of everyone she interacted with previously are supposed to have been erased. However, thanks to an empty box of Pochy, his memories flood back on seeing Mizuho return to her job as his homeroom teacher. He pretends not to recognize Mizuho until he has a chance to be alone with her. Initially dismayed at his act, the two confess their love for each other and marry again, repeating the events of episode 1.
OVA	"Secret Couple" "Himitsu na Futari" (ヒミツなふたり)	October 25, 2002
Hatsuho and Maho return for a visit and Hatsuho forces Mizuho to talk about intimate details of her relationship with Kei. Hatsuho kidnaps Kei, takes him to a love hotel, and ties him to a bed. Although Hatsuho is attracted to Kei, this is actually an attempt to add excitement into Kei and Mizuho's marriage, which ends in success when Mizuho arrives to save Kei but ends up in bed with him. The following day, Kei and Mizuho becomes shocked and discomforted after finding out that everyone in school is talking about what happened between Mizuho and Kei along with Maho, and Hatsuho at the love hotel by Ichigo.

=== Manga ===
Please Teacher! was adapted into a manga series, authored by Shizuru Hayashiya, which was serialized in MediaWorks's manga magazine, Dengeki Daioh, in January 2002, its run consisting of two-bound volume compilations. The manga has since been licensed for North American distribution by ComicsOne and in Brazil by Editora JBC, under the title Onegai Teacher.

The story maintains the basic plot, but adds comic humor that suits the manga format well, taking full advantage of still frames. However, there are quite a few minor details that have been omitted from the anime or were completely changed: the relationship between Hyosuke and Kaede is deflected, with Hyosuke ending up with Ichigo; Yamada is never introduced; Minoru is much more overt with his lecherousness, but is a great deal of help in Kei and Mizuho's relationship; Koishi's role is diminished somewhat; Hatsuho is only shown in only two frames, as a transmission call to the couple warning them of Maho's wrath and in the other world when Kei has a standstill; and finally, the Okinawan honeymoon is never shown or mentioned.

=== Light novel ===
The light novel version entitled Onegai Teacher: Mizuho and Kei's Milky Diary was written by Gō Zappa and illustrated by Taraku Uon and Hiroaki Gōda. It was published in Japan by MediaWorks in March 2003 and was only one volume in length. The English edition was released by Comics One in October 2003.

== Reception ==
Critical reception of Please Teacher! has been generally positive.

Carlos Ross and Lauren Smoller of THEM Anime Reviews gave the TV series a rating 4 out of 5 stars, and the OVA a rating of 3 out of 5 stars respectively. Ross praised the animation, cast of characters, character designs and development, the opening track, the chemistry between Kei and Mizuho, but handed out criticism regarding the plot. He states that "the plot does rely on a whole lot of circumstances and cliches that do get grating as the series goes on. While the accessory characters are often just as well characterized as the leads, you do get really sick of them popping up to interfere with the main relationship." Overall, Ross concludes that "there are moments in this show that are pure magic. While its flaws prevent it from being the best of the best, this anime is very well worth watching and picking up the moment you see it on the shelf." Smoller handed out mild praise for the OVA's animation, and the chemistry between the two main leads, but handed out criticism for the lack of a coherent plot, the jokes, and the supporting cast. She also notes that the OVA's main target audience is for adults, stating that it is "basically soft-core hentai."

Theron Martin of Anime News Network gave the series a B− rating, praising the soundtrack, animation, character designs and development, and the chemistry between Kei and Mizuho, but criticized the plot for being too cliched. He handed out mild praise for the English dub, stating that it sticks very closely to the original Japanese, and handed out good marks for Sandy Fox's performance as Maho Kazami. Martin ultimately concludes that "it is a mildly entertaining series with occasional strong points and some storytelling aspects which offer a different feel than most current romantic fare."

== See also ==
- Please Twins!
- Waiting in the Summer
