= Please Twins! =

Japanese anime television series

- The main characters of Onegai Twins: Miina, Maiku and Karen

おねがい☆ツインズ (Onegai ☆ Twins)
- Genre: Comedy; Drama; Romance
- Anime television series
- Directed by: Yasunori Ide
- Produced by: Takeshi Anzai; Kouji Morimoto
- Written by: Yōsuke Kuroda
- Music by: ZIZZ; Feel; Soushi Hosoi
- Studio: Daume
- Licensed by: Crunchyroll (Note: In North America through Crunchyroll, LLC (formerly known as Funimation).)
- Original network: WOWOW, Bandai Channel
- Original run: July 15, 2003 – October 14, 2003
- Episodes: 12 + OVA
- Light novel
- Written by: Gō Zappa
- Illustrated by: Taraku Uon; Hiroaki Gōda
- Published by: MediaWorks
- English publisher: NA: ComicsOne
- Imprint: Dengeki Bunko
- Published: 2004
- Volumes: 2
- Manga

Onegai Twins
- Written by: Akikan
- Published by: MediaWorks
- English publisher: NA: ComicsOne
- Magazine: Dengeki Daioh
- Published: September 2005
- Volumes: 2

Please Twins! (Japanese: おねがい☆ツインズ, Hepburn: Onegai Tsuinzu; Onegai ☆ Twins!) is a Japanese anime television series scripted by Yōsuke Kuroda and produced by Bandai Visual, which was later adapted into a light novel and one-volume manga series. It centers on a family of three teenagers in high school all living together who are unsure which two of them are related to each other due to a reference from an old photograph. The Please Twins! anime series is a spin-off sequel to Please Teacher!. It first aired in Japan on the WOWOW satellite television network on July 15, 2003, and finished with a total of 12 episodes plus a later OVA episode released on DVD. The series was later adapted into a light novel in 2004, which spanned a total of two volumes and, soon after, into a short one-tankōbon manga version (authored by Akikan), which was serialized in MediaWorks's Dengeki Daioh magazine in September 2005.

== Plot ==
Please Twins! is a story about three high-school students: Maiku Kamishiro, Karen Onodera, and Miina Miyafuji. The three were drawn together by a photograph of their childhood home which later makes all of them seek out the house in the picture. However, the picture shows only two children, a boy and a girl. The three conclude from this that only one of the girls, either Karen or Miina, can be related to Maiku. The other must be a nonrelative. The only other identifying feature of the pair in the picture is that the boy and the girl have eyes of the same unusual color, a feature that furthers the ambiguity as all three of them share the same eye color.

The main concern of the male lead, Maiku, is that, although he eventually comes to care for both of the girls, he does not know which of them is his sister. In addition, the two girls develop feelings for Maiku, forming a love triangle that cannot be resolved until the truth of their relationship is known. All three main characters are in the predicament of wanting to discover their past versus the risk of losing a romantic relationship.

The events of the story are set the year after Please Teacher! and characters from that series appear in supporting roles throughout Please Twins!.

== Characters ==
Left-Right: Karen Onodera, Maiku Kamishiro, and Miina Miyafuji.

Maiku Kamishiro (神城 麻郁, Kamishiro Maiku)
Voiced by: Daisuke Namikawa (Japanese); Johnny Yong Bosch (English)
The main protagonist of the story, Maiku (pronounced 'Mike' in the English dub) tends to be very secretive and stoic. He moves into the blue house shown on the news about a UFO appearance (an incident which happened in Please Teacher! episode 1), which is the same house on an old photograph that he kept. At the beginning of the story, he is living alone but is soon joined by Miina Miyafuji and Karen Onodera after they each trace their copies of the photograph to the house, and the three appear to have the same unusual blue eye color. He treats his two potential relatives harshly, frequently calling them idiots and bossing them around; however we find out later in the series he does this to avoid getting hurt by people he cares about. Later, he warms to them but still maintains a tough exterior. He is a computer programmer who takes contract work and a student in high school. He acknowledges Miina as his girlfriend in the OVA episode. In the light novel Miina is his biological sister and Maiku chooses Karen.
Miina Miyafuji (宮藤 深衣奈, Miyafuji Miina)
Voiced by: Mai Nakahara (Japanese); Kari Wahlgren (English)
Miina has an enthusiastic and outgoing personality. Gradually she develops feelings for Maiku but is afraid to act on them. As she states it, if she is related to Maiku she has a 'right' to live in the house, but can't have a romantic relationship with him. If she isn't related then she can have that relationship, but can't live in the house. She outwardly expresses herself as happy-go-lucky, although she is hiding things about her past. The anime, novel and manga each have different resolutions to the mystery of the photo. In the anime's end, Maiku accepts Miina's feelings; in the light novel she is his sister.
Karen Onodera (小野寺 樺恋, Onodera Karen)
Voiced by: Ai Shimizu (Japanese); Lara Jill Miller (English)
Karen is usually a very shy and timid girl who is even prone to passing out (called 'nyu's', for the syllable she utters as she does so) when a situation gets too intense for her to handle. She frequently calls people by a title. Like Miina, she also develops feelings for Maiku, though she does not act on them giving the same reasons Miina does. In the anime it turns out that Karen is Maiku's twin sister, as discovered when she finds a diary in the abandoned house across the street from their house that proves they are related. In the light novel she and Maiku are not related and the two begin a romantic relationship.

=== Supporting characters ===
Haruko Shidō (四道 晴子, Shidō Haruko)
Voiced by: Ryoko Shintani (Japanese); Therese Nguyen (English)
Haruko is Matagu's younger sister and is usually very bubbly and hyperactive. She has a very immature personality and, while she acknowledges that her brother is a pervert, she seems completely oblivious to such mature matters. She attends class 1A. She, Akina Sagawa and Futaba Mashita greet Miina and Karen on their first day of school.
Kousei Shimazaki (島崎 康生, Shimazaki Kōsei)
Voiced by: Kenichi Suzumura (Japanese); Crispin Freeman (English)
Kousei is Maiku's only real friend at the beginning of the series. He sits next to Maiku in class, and often becomes a bit too flirtatious with Maiku, usually resulting in him getting punched or slapped away by Maiku. For example, when Maiku reveals he needs money, Kousei actually tells him that if he stayed with him for a night, he would pay as much as Maiku wanted, resulting in him getting slapped. Despite Kousei's flirtations making Maiku uncomfortable and Maiku hitting or slapping Kousei in response, the two are close friends throughout the series. Kosei is assumed by his peers to be Homosexual, by his many openly flirtatious interactions with Maiku. However, it's eventually revealed that Kousei is still in love with his ex-girlfriend, Tsubaki, revealing that he is actually bisexual. Kosei eventually manages to work out things with Tsubaki and they get together again in the end.
Tsubaki Oribe (織部 椿, Oribe Tsubaki)
Voiced by: Michiko Neya (Japanese); Jessica Straus (English)
Tsubaki is the vice president of the student council and usually has a very serious personality. Intelligent and outgoing, gifted with a busty figure and possessing a more mature personality than the 'twin' girls, she is a source of concern for Karen and Miina as being an obvious rival for Maiku's affections. Her attempts to interest Maiku in a relationship, however, are met with Maiku's tacit plea for just friendship. It is not until she confers with (the much older and wiser) Ichigo that Tsubaki realizes that Maiku cannot engage in any casual romantic relationship due to both his obligations to his new-found 'family' and his own forcibly matured, responsible nature. This causes Tsubaki to gain a higher degree of respect for Maiku, and to focus her attentions on the one person she once thought too forceful in expressing his affection for her, Kousei Shimazaki. In the anime she had objected to Kousei putting his hand on her breast when they kissed for the first time. In the light novel she had been psychologically traumatized when her brother died at a young age and she had been trying to fill a void, first with Kousei, then with Maiku. In the anime, however; Tsubaki managed to work out things with Kosei and they get together again in the end.
Yuuka Yashiro (社 裕香, Yashiro Yūka)
Voiced by: Miyuki Sawashiro (Japanese); Julie Maddalena (English)
Yuuka is Miina's friend from middle school. She appears at the end of episode 9, recognizing Miina and recalling the history that Miina has been trying to put behind her. Miina comes to terms with it in episode 10, and Yuuka is seen again at the beginning of episode 11. In the light novel this section of the Please Twins! story is entirely rewritten and Yuuka is omitted, replaced with Yukiko Kachofugetsuin, Karen's rival in playing the piano.

=== From Please Teacher! ===
Some of the Please Teacher! characters return in various supporting roles.

Ichigo Morino (森野 苺, Morino Ichigo)
Voiced by: Yukari Tamura (Japanese); Julie Ann Taylor (English)
Ichigo has changed a lot since the events of Please Teacher!. She has become president of the student council, described in the first novel as the most effective in the school's history, and somewhat perversely enjoys getting dirt on other students. Ichigo usually avoids male companionship though, in fact, she has normal desires in this regard. This is partly due to a unique disease where she was put into a "standstill", a form of metabolic stasis similar to a coma, for six years, which stopped her aging process. The disease can be triggered by psychological stress; hence her deadpan, phlegmatic personality is a counter to prevent its onset, a stronger personality trait in Twins than in Please Teacher!. She has also added a quiet "heh heh heh" to the end of many of her statements, as if she were privately enjoying a joke. In effect, she appears to be a grade-schooler when in fact she is much older when the story begins. Most of the details of her life are revealed in Please Teacher! and are not mentioned in this story. In the Twins anime series, there was no mention of her growth standstill, while the light novels make only one vague passing allusion. In the novels, Ichigo and Matagu Shido have a history, which Morino dislikes and guards against.
Matagu Shido (四道 跨, Shidō Matagu)
Voiced by: Hiroaki Miura (Japanese); Tony Schnur (English)
Matagu is a senior to the main characters and tends to come off as an incestuous pervert, though he is otherwise good-natured. His appearances tend to be for comic relief. He also has a sister complex on Haruko, possibly due to him having no luck with women. At the end of this series, he is in the hospital after being haunted by the ghost in the countryside and he has no visitors.
Mizuho Kazami (風見 みずほ, Kazami Mizuho)
Voiced by: Kikuko Inoue (Japanese); Bridget Hoffman (English)
Mizuho is employed as a teacher at the school where all the characters attend. She is homeroom teacher of Class 1B, with Maiku and Kosei being her students. She is in fact a half-human alien. She can be somewhat ditzy, but also very open-hearted, compassionate and sociable. In a somewhat nostalgic replay of the situation that led to her and Kei being discovered by the former headmaster, Miina and Karen are forced to hide in the very same sports equipment locker. Marie locates them, and Mizuho transports herself to it covertly to counsel the two girls on the true nature of Maiku's seeming gruffness towards them, asserting that it screens genuine kindness and affection for them. Her half-alien nature is never mentioned in the Twins anime, and this scene is the only allusion to it in the anime. She is married to Kei Kusanagi which is now an open secret at the school.
Marie (まりえ)
Voiced by: Tomoko Kaneda (Japanese); Sandy Fox (English)
Marie is Mizuho's diminutive assistant and companion. A quasi-organic systems link to the operating system controlling Kazami's cloaked and submerged starship and its transporter functions, 'he' has been nicknamed "Fushigi-chan" ("Little Wonder" in English) by Karen for an ability to materialize almost anywhere, often after being summoned without any seeming communications device employed. 'He' makes occasional appearances in the neighborhood, at school and the protagonist's shared residence. As 'his' master Kazami does with "Pochy", 'he' enjoys eating "Prech", a snack food based on the real-life snack Pretz, for which he has an insatiable appetite. The anime establishes that Marie's existence is publicly known and accepted (despite 'his' other-worldly appearance and demonstrated abilities such as levitation) by several of the school's students as being a part of the local UFO folklore surrounding the area, thanks to the events of Please Teacher!. It is commented by Mizuho that Marie is a frequent visitor and overnight guest at the Kamishiro residence, and is seen 'sleeping' on the same futon with the two girls.
Hatsuho Kazami (風見 はつほ, Kazami Hatsuho)
Mizuho's mother. She is a very sensual, self-assured, bold but subtly assertive woman. She appears in one chapter of the light novels, hooking onto Maiku at a festival. She does not appear in the anime or the manga.
Kei Kusanagi (草薙 桂, Kusanagi Kei)
Voiced by: Soichiro Hoshi (Japanese); Dave Wittenberg (English)
Kei is the senior to the main characters who does not speak in the first 12 episodes of the Twins series. Kei has the same extraordinary disease as Ichigo which caused him to be in a "standstill" for three years. Kei is now 20 in this series. He was covertly married to Mizuho Kazami in the original series, but their marriage is now common knowledge in this series. This is from rumors spread around the school in the post-credits scene of the Please Teacher! OVA.
Koishi Herikawa (縁川小石, Herikawa Koishi)
Voiced by: Ayako Kawasumi (Japanese); Michelle Ruff (English)
Koishi is a third-year high school student in this series. She is slender, with short brown hair cut straight across in back. Her parents own the Herikawa Groceries and she assists there. As such, she becomes Miina and Karen's manager after the two of them obtain part-time jobs at the store, thanks to Ichigo's machinations and her longtime friendship with Koishi. She was most of the time behind the counter studying for university entrance exams. She is seen with Miina in episode 11, and in one brief camera shot in EP12 along with Kaede Misumi. In the OVA, she has a conversation with Miina in which she encourages Miina to pursue a romantic relationship with Maiku, then spends the rest of the episode with Ichigo.
Hyosuke Magumo (間雲 漂介, Magumo Hyōsuke)
Voiced by: Mitsuo Iwata (Japanese); Kirk Thornton (English)
A brash student with dyed blonde hair, Hyosuke aspires to attend college at Tokyo University and become a professional statesman, much like his brother. Currently going out with Kaede. He only appears in episode 13.
Kaede Misumi (水澄 楓, Misumi Kaede)
Voiced by: Sayaka Ohara (Japanese); Rebecca Forstadt (English)
Kaede tends to be a rather shy girl most of the time. Her physical characteristics include that she is one quarter Irish, tall (for a Japanese) and with red hair and freckles. Currently going out with Hyosuke. She appears only in episode 13 and at the end of episode 12 in which she and Koishi have a look at the photos that Ichigo took.
Masaomi Yamada (山田 正臣, Yamada Masaomi)
Voiced by: Tomokazu Sugita (Japanese); Tony Oliver (English)
A quiet male teacher whose hobby is creating human-powered planes, he is in a secret relationship with Koishi. He is the homeroom teacher of Class 1A. Miina, Karen, Haruko, Akina Sagawa and Futaba Mashita are all in his class. In this series, he has shaved his beard and has become popular with the girls as Koishi said he would.
Nat
Voiced by: Chinami Nishimura (Japanese); Wendee Lee (English)
Nat (Nat-chan in Japanese) is known as the little girl during the summer (both in this anime, and in Please Teacher!). In this series she is seated on a lifeguard's tower with her dog seated beside her, scanning with binoculars for a boy to fall in love with. She spots Maiku and falls for him. A moment later, however, she sees Karen and Miina with Maiku and she tumbles backward off the tower, dragging her dog by the leash after her, heartbroken.

== Media ==
=== Anime ===
The Please Twins! anime series, scripted by Yōsuke Kuroda, directed by Yasunori Ide, and produced by Bandai Visual, premiered in Japan on the WOWOW satellite television network between July 15, 2003, and October 14, 2003, consisting of a total of 12 episodes. An OVA episode continuing the story was later released on DVD on April 23, 2004. The series has been licensed for North American distribution by Bandai Entertainment. Two pieces of theme music were used for the episodes: one opening theme and one ending theme. The opening theme is "Second Flight" by Kotoko and Hiromi Satō, and the ending theme is "Asu e no Namida" by Mami Kawada.

==== Episode list ====
No.	Title	Original release date
1	"Three Twins?" "Futago ga Sannin?" (双子が3人?)	July 15, 2003
Miina and Karen, two girls with blue eyes, arrive at Maiku's doorstep claiming that they are related to him as they all have the same picture of what they think is them and their twin brother.
2	"We Might be Related" "Nikushin ka mo Shirenai" (肉親かもしれない)	July 22, 2003
Maiku ponders if he should let Miina and Karen stay with him.
3	"We Might be Strangers" "Tanin ka mo Shirenai" (他人かもしれない)	July 29, 2003
Trouble arises when Tsubaki, who likes Maiku, comes to their house on student council business.
4	"Kind to You" "Kimi ni Yasashiku" (きみにやさしく)	August 5, 2003
Miina and Karen search for jobs so as to help Maiku pay their bills. A series of events causes them to end up hiding from everybody at Maiku's school. Maiku also decides that the two girls should go to school.
5	"Do You Like Girls?" "Onnanoko wa Suki desu ka?" (女の子は好きですか?)	August 19, 2003
After hearing rumors about Maiku being gay, Miina and Karen test Maiku to see for themselves whether this is true or not.
6	"Love Alliance" "Ren'ai Dōmei" (恋愛同盟)	August 26, 2003
All three of them feel strange around each other after the events of the previous episode. Miina and Karen create a "Love Alliance" to prevent this feeling.
7	"Making Memories" "Omoidezukuri" (おもいでづくり)	September 2, 2003
After winning the grand prize in a lottery, Maiku, Miina and Karen head to Okinawa and the beach. Because of bad luck, it is the same beach visited in Please Teacher!, and everyone else soon shows up.
8	"Be Honest in Love" "Koi wa Sunao ni" (恋は素直に)	September 9, 2003
Ichigo Morino reprises one of her roles from Please Teacher!, and tries to set Tsubaki up with Maiku. This leads to frustrations, and Tsubaki and Shimazaki learn to be honest with themselves about their love.
9	"Don't Leave Me Out" "Nukegake Shinaide" (ぬけがけしないで)	September 16, 2003
On a beautiful day, the three head to the mall, but end up getting lost from each other.
10	"I Want to Run Again" "Mō Ichido Hashiritai" (もういちど走りたい)	September 30, 2003
Maiku and Karen learn of Miina's past. Karen realizes that the picture of Maiku and one of the girls was taken at a different angle from what they had previously thought, leading her to discover a diary in a ruined house.
11	"I Want to Tell You I Love You" "Anata ni Suki to Tsutaetai" (あなたに好きと伝えたい)	October 7, 2003
After Karen finds out who is the relative from the diary, she goes out on a date with Maiku before telling him (all the while breaking the Love Alliance) that she is his sister. However, Miina runs away when Karen tells her that Miina is not Maiku's sister.
12	"We Are Three Twins" "Sannin de Tsuinzu" (3人でツインズ)	October 14, 2003
Miina runs away, but returns to the school without a word. After Karen talks to her, Miina goes to the train station, where she is reunited with Maiku. Miina reveals why she ran away, then she and Maiku confess their feelings for one another. At the end of the episode, it is revealed that Miina is the girl in the photo with Maiku, but she was actually a childhood friend.
OVA	"The Summer Never Ends" "Natsu wa Owaranai" (夏は終わらない)	April 23, 2004
Maiku craves for alone time to catch up on work, but the student council, Miina, Karen and more arrive for a party. Miina wants to spend alone time with Maiku, but Karen wants to be spoiled by Maiku and comes between the two.

=== Light novel ===
Please Twins! was later adapted into a light novel, authored by Gō Zappa and illustrated by Taraku Uon and Hiroaki Gōda. It was published in Japan by MediaWorks in 2004. It was later licensed for North American distribution by ComicsOne and published in two volumes in 2005.

The light novel covers several different events that did not occur in the anime and omits some events altogether. While the basic story stays intact, there is one large difference: the identity of Maiku's sister in the novel differs from the anime version.

=== Manga ===
The series was later adapted into a short one-volume manga version, authored by Akikan, which was serialized in MediaWorks's Dengeki Daioh magazine in September 2005. The manga has since been licensed for North American distribution by ComicsOne and published in 2006. The manga introduces another character in the last two chapters, Hanna Miasa, who provides the explanation for the photograph, and Maiku's, Miina's and Karen's background and relation ties. In the manga both Miina and Karen are related to Maiku. One is his twin sister and the other is his first cousin.

=== CD drama ===
There is also a CD drama spinoff of the "Onegaiverse" called Onegai Friends. The characters in the CD Drama are Maiku, from class 1-A: Yamada-sensei, Karen, Miina, Haruko, Akina Sagawa, Futaba Mashita and Harumi Shinohara. Girl is in love with boy. Boy is in love with a different girl.

=== Single ===
Single cover art

"Second Flight" single contains the opening and ending themes for the anime series Onegai Twins. "Second Flight" by Kotoko and Hiromi Satō served as its opening theme while its B-side, "Asu e no Namida" by Mami Kawada is the ending theme. The single peaked at number 15 on Oricon Singles Chart.

==== Track listing ====
1. Second Flight (Kotoko & Hiromi Satō) -- 5:42
  Lyrics: Kotoko
  Composition: Kazuya Takase
  Arrangement: Tomoyuki Nakazawa
2. Asu e no Namida (Mami Kawada) -- 6:28
  Lyrics: Kotoko
  Composition/Arrangement: Tomoyuki Nakazawa
3. Second Flight (Off Vocal) -- 5:42
4. Asu e no Namida (Off Vocal) -- 6:25

== See also ==
- Please Teacher!
- Waiting in the Summer
