= Ah! My Goddess: The Movie =

2000 film by Hiroaki Gōda

- Japanese film poster

Japanese name
- Kanji: 劇場版「ああっ女神さまっ」
Transcriptions
- Revised Hepburn: Gekijōban "Aa! Megami-sama!"
- Directed by: Hiroaki Gōda
- Screenplay by: Michiko Yokote; Yoshihiko Tomizawa
- Based on: Oh My Goddess! by Kōsuke Fujishima
- Produced by: Seiichi Horiguchi; Kin'ya Watanabe; Tsuyoshi Yoshida
- Starring: Kikuko Inoue; Masami Kikuchi; Yumi Tōma; Aya Hisakawa
- Cinematography: Hisao Shirai
- Edited by: Toshio Henmi; Yutaka Itō
- Music by: Shirō Hamaguchi
- Production company: AIC
- Distributed by: Shochiku
- Release date: October 21, 2000
- Running time: 105 minutes
- Country: Japan
- Language: Japanese

Ah! My Goddess: The Movie (劇場版「ああっ女神さまっ」, Gekijōban "Aa! Megami-sama!"), also known as Oh My Goddess! The Movie, is a 2000 Japanese animated fantasy comedy film based on the manga by Kōsuke Fujishima, produced by AIC and distributed by Shochiku. It was directed by Hiroaki Gōda, written by Michiko Yokote and Yoshihiko Tomizawa and it is a direct sequel to the 1993 OVA miniseries. The film stars the voices of Kikuko Inoue, Masami Kikuchi, Yumi Tōma, and Aya Hisakawa. In the film, Celestin, a former mentor of Belldandy, is released by Morgan Le Fay and erases Keiichi's memories from Belldandy, infecting her with a virus designed to hack the Yggdrasil computer in the heavens.

The film's theatrical release took place on October 21, 2000. The film was licensed by Geneon Entertainment in North America, MVM Films in the United Kingdom, and Madman Entertainment in Australia and New Zealand.

== Plot ==
Three years have passed since Belldandy's arrival on Earth. On the Moon, the demon Morgan Le Fay frees a seal containing Celestin at the Lunar Prison and receives a mysterious message urging them to unite for a common goal.

On Earth, the New Year begins with the Motor Club showcasing vehicles for an upcoming mixed-gender race, including a new two-seater for Keiichi Morisato and Belldandy. That night, after a near-compromising encounter with a club member, Keiichi and Belldandy share a moment interrupted by Celestin, who kisses Belldandy and infects her with a virus, causing her to lose her memory of Keiichi. Peorth alerts Urd that Yggdrasil is compromised and the Heavens isolate themselves from Earth, preventing Belldandy from receiving treatment.

The next morning, Skuld unsuccessfully tries restoring Belldandy's memories, and Keiichi resolves to live normally despite her condition. Concerned about the upcoming race, the Motor Club accepts Morgan's offer to replace Belldandy. After a trial run with Keiichi, Belldandy regains faint memories. Keiichi, overwhelmed by the situation, nearly crashes while driving recklessly.

Belldandy discovers a photo album filled with their shared memories and decides to remain Keiichi's partner for the race. Morgan, irritated, challenges them to a race alongside Megumi, but Keiichi and Belldandy's victory unlocks more of her memories.

Belldandy overhears a conversation revealing Celestin's manipulation. Shocked and confused, she is lured away by Celestin, who uses the virus to turn her against her elder sister in battle. Keiichi and Skuld's arrival causes a surge of uncontrollable energy from Belldandy, devastating the surroundings. Skuld attacks Celestin, inadvertently triggering a flood. Keiichi shields Belldandy from the wave but is left comatose, prompting her desperate attempts to revive him.

At the temple, a shocked Belldandy is comforted by Skuld, who reminds her of the strength of their friendships and shared experiences. Meanwhile, Keiichi finds Morgan injured and insists on taking her to the hospital. Morgan forcibly kisses Keiichi, witnessed by Belldandy, deepening the emotional tension.

Belldandy prepares to accept a vaccine that risks erasing her memories to destroy the virus. However, the virus exploits Belldandy's link to Yggdrasil uses the ceremony to infiltrate deeper, rewriting itself to bypass security. Using Belldandy as a host, Celestin pulls a top-secret program into the vaccine's magical mandala, creating a massive field engulfing the temple and forest, materializing colossal tree trunks and a gigantic being.

In a flashback, Celestin rebels against the Gods due to their indifference to mortal suffering. After attempting to destroy the Gate of Judgment, he is imprisoned in the Lunar Prison, and Belldandy's memories of the event are erased.

Back in the present, the Goddesses unite to stop Celestin and Morgan from destroying Yggdrasil and Earth, which would necessitate creating a new world free from suffering. Peorth authorizes using the spear Gungnir, but Belldandy shields Celestin from the attack to protect Keiichi. Keiichi borrows Celestin's power to help Belldandy block the strike, convincing Celestin to relent and release Keiichi from possession.

Belldandy, Keiichi, and Morgan are transported to the Gate of Judgment. Having lost her love attempting this test, Morgan warns them not to pass, but they return safely to Earth. Morgan stays behind to tell future couples their story. Back in the Heavens, Yggdrasil is critically damaged. The Goddesses and their angels sing to restore the World Tree before dematerializing it. Alone, Belldandy informs Keiichi that the virus deleted Yggdrasil's records, freeing him once again to make any wish. Smiling, Keiichi replies, "That's easy," rekindling their love.

== Cast ==
Character	Japanese voice actor	English dubbing actor
Keiichi Morisato	Masami Kikuchi	Tony Oliver
Belldandy	Kikuko Inoue; Mio Shionoiri (young)	Bridget Hoffman; Chloe Thornton (young)
Urd	Yumi Tōma	Mary Elizabeth McGlynn
Skuld	Aya Hisakawa	Sherry Lynn
Celestine	Hiroshi Yanaka	Steve Blum
Morgan Le Fey	Ayako Kawasumi	Lia Sargent
Peorth	Rei Sakuma	Riva Spier
Megumi Morisato	Yuriko Fuchizaki	Stephanie Greene

== Soundtrack ==
The music was composed by Shirō Hamaguchi and conducted by Mario Klemens with performances by the Warsaw Philharmonic Orchestra. The main theme, Try to Wish, was performed by Saori Nishihata. The main theme was composed by Final Fantasy series composer Nobuo Uematsu. The soundtrack was released by Pony Canyon in Japan and Geneon Entertainment in North America.

== Home video releases ==
- November 27, 2001 (Pioneer)
- November 8, 2005 (Geneon)

== Reception ==
T.H.E.M. Anime Reviews described the animation and music of the movie as "absolutely beautiful", and gave the movie a perfect rating. Anime News Network praised the blend of CGI and cel artwork for the movie, and the casting choices for the dub. Sequential Tart criticised the film's lack of comedy and dub acting, but praised the artwork. As of May 2026, there is no tomatometer score for the movie, but the popcornmeter score rests at 88% with over 250 user reviews.
