= Eddie Frierson =

American voice actor and writer

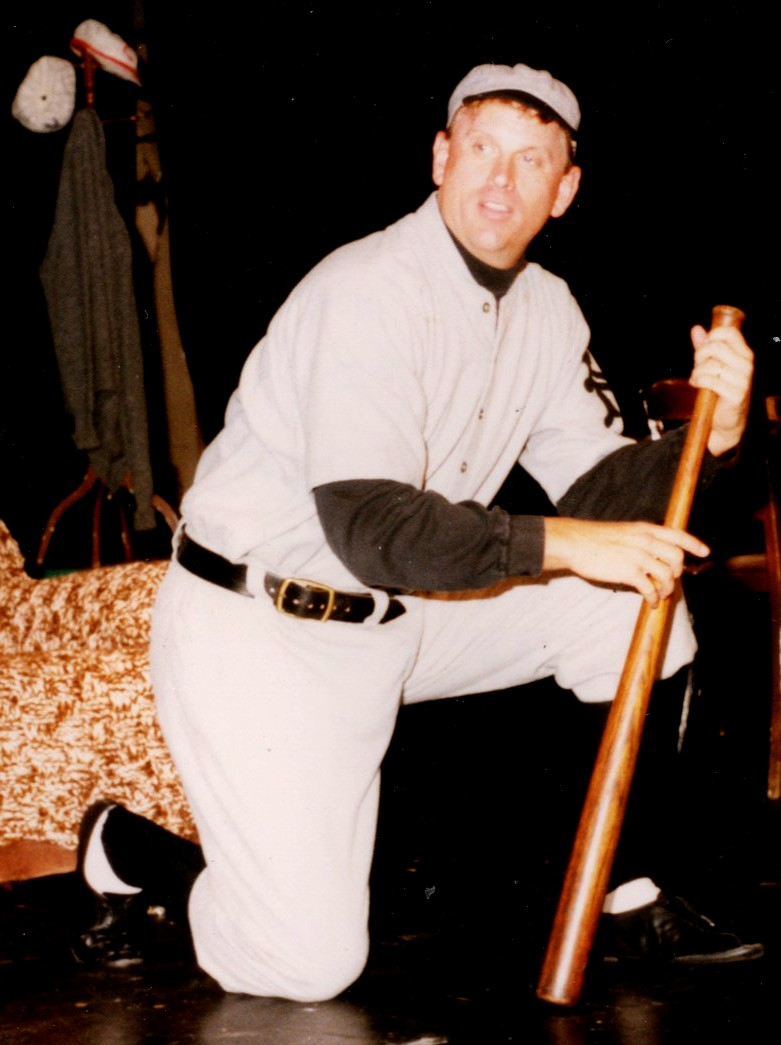
- Frierson performs as Christy Mathewson in his one-man show "Matty" at Keystone College in Factoryville, Pennsylvania.
- Born: November 22, 1959 (age 66); Nashville, Tennessee, U.S.
- Other name: Eric Frierson
- Occupations: Voice actor, writer
- Years active: 1981–present
- Spouse: Natalie Beck (m. 1994; div. 2012)
- Children: 3

Eddie Frierson (born November 22, 1959) is an American voice actor and writer. He has provided voices for such films as Wreck-It Ralph, Hotel Transylvania, The Princess and the Frog, ParaNorman, Curious George, Tangled the video games Medal of Honor: Airborne and Sengoku Basara: Samurai Heroes and the animated television series MÄR: Märchen Awakens Romance.

On the stage, he played Baseball Hall of Fame pitcher Christy Mathewson in the one-man show Matty: An Evening with Christy Mathewson.

== Life and career ==
Originally from Nashville, Tennessee, Frierson has been doing voicework for many anime series and movies since the 1980s, and has also been a voice actor for two of Saban Entertainment's most well-known shows - the Power Rangers franchise and VR Troopers. While during his tenure in the Saban shows, he only did voicework for one-shot characters in the earlier years, he was able to play a major role in 2001's Power Rangers Time Force when he did the voice of the mad robot scientist Frax. After the PR franchise moved to New Zealand in 2003 (which laid off much of the PR crew, Frierson included), Frierson has continued to do voicework for various anime series such as .hack and Robotech, as well as voicework in animated children's movies such as Curious George, Chicken Little, and The Wild. He has also done voicework for different video game franchises, such as the Medal of Honor series.

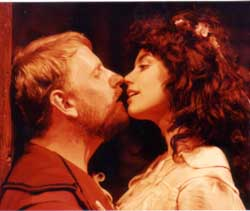
Frierson as Horatio in Hamlet opposite Deborah Gates

Frierson's theater work includes roles such as Horatio in Mark Ringer's staging of Hamlet, and Flute in A Midsummer Night's Dream at Nevada Shakespeare in the Park. He twice won the prestigious Maurice Scott Award for Los Angeles theatre for his performances as Dapper in Ben Jonson's The Alchemist at the Globe Playhouse and as Count Vronsky in Anna Karenina at Theatre Rapport. He also won a New England Drama Critic's award for his portrayal of the dim-witted Red Sox pitcher Tank in Steve Kluger's acclaimed nine-inning comedy, Bullpen.

Eddie was on Tic Tac DOugh in the 1985–86 season and won $4900 in cash.

== Matty ==
Frierson's award-winning one-man show Matty: An Evening With Christy Mathewson, directed by fellow voice actor Kerrigan Mahan, is built around Hall of Fame baseball pitcher Christy Mathewson. Frierson has taken the show across the country, including Off-Broadway in New York, and National Public Radio named it one of the 10 best shows of the New York theatre season. He won Drama-Logue Awards as both an actor and writer during the show's Los Angeles engagement. He has performed the show in Mathewson's hometown of Factoryville, Pennsylvania, at the pitcher's alma mater Bucknell University, and at the Baseball Hall of Fame.

Frierson has formed The Mathewson Foundation, dedicated to the preservation of American History through baseball. He plans to focus those efforts and locate the Foundation in Factoryville. Also in the works for Frierson are the first true biographies of Christy, both in book form and for the big screen.

== Filmography ==
=== Anime ===
- .hack - Additional Voices
- 3×3 Eyes: Legend of the Divine Demon - Yakumo Fujii (Streamline dub only)
- The Adventures of Mini-Goddess - Blue Rat
- Akira - Additional voices (credited as "Christopher Mathewson") (Streamline and Geneon dubs)
- Babel II - Additional Voices
- Battle Athletes - USSA Official
- Battle Athletes Victory - Additional Voices
- Carried by the Wind: Tsukikage Ran - Crying Husband; Fisherman; Tokuji; Wandering Samurai
- Casshan: Robot Hunter - Additional Voices
- The Cockpit - Various
- Cowboy Bebop - Space Warrior
- Crying Freeman - Chen (Streamline Dub)
- Digimon Adventure - Datamon
- Dirty Pair: Project Eden - Plant Manager
- Dogtanian and the Three Muskehounds - Aramis
- Dragon Ball - Tenshinhan (Shinto) (Harmony Gold dub only)
- Dual! Parallel Trouble Adventure - Various
- El Hazard - Makoto Mizuhara
- Fist of the North Star - Additional Voices
- Fushigi Yuugi - Various
- Gatchaman (1994) - Ken
- Gatekeepers 21 - Student, Gang Leader
- Ghost in the Shell: Stand Alone Complex 2nd GIG - Various
- Golgo 13: Queen Bee - Various
- The Professional: Golgo 13 - Gold
- Hajime no Ippo - Mamoru Takamura
- Honeybee Hutch - Various
- Kikaider - Silver Hakaider
- Kyo Kara Maoh! - Alford, Dakaskos, Erhalt
- Laputa: Castle in the Sky - Louis, Old Engineer (Original dub only), Additional Voices
- Little Women - Additional Voices
- Maple Town - Additional Voices
- MÄR - Edward
- Mobile Suit Gundam: The Movie Trilogy - Kai Shiden
- Mobile Suit Gundam: The 08th MS Team - Eledore Massis
- Mobile Suit Gundam 0083: Stardust Memory - Jaburo Officer A
- Naruto - Hakkaku
- Noein - Atori
- Noozles - Various
- Outlaw Star - Race Official, Silgrian
- Robot Carnival - Toki
- Robotech: The Macross Sega - Lynn Kyle
- Robotech: The Shadow Chronicles - Louis Nichols
- Saint Tail - Additional Voices
- Serial Experiments Lain - J.J.
- Street Fighter II V - Various (Animaze Dub)
- Tenchi in Tokyo - Mr. Fujisawa
- Tenchi Muyo! - Male GP Controller
- Tenchi Muyo! in Love - Male GP Controller
- Trigun - Sheriff, Additional Voices
- Tokyo Pig - Additional Voices
- Wowser - Additional Voices
- X - Additional Voices
- Yukikaze - Richard Burgadish
- Zillion - Dave
- Zillion: Burning Night - Dave

=== Non-anime ===
- The Return of Dogtanian - Aramis
- God, the Devil and Bob - Guest Star
- Iznogoud - Various
- Jin Jin and the Panda Patrol - Additional Voices
- Oliver Twist - Additional Voices
- Walter Melon - Additional Voices
- Willy Fog 2 - Tico
- Wisdom of the Gnomes - Additional Voices

=== Live-action ===
- Cheers - 1st Customer
- Mighty Morphin Power Rangers - Blue Globbor, Octophantom, Weldo (voices, uncredited)
- Power Rangers Lightspeed Rescue - Strikning (voice)
- Power Rangers Lost Galaxy - Ironite (voice)
- Power Rangers Time Force - Frax (voice)
- Power Rangers Turbo - Terror Tooth (voice, uncredited)
- Power Rangers Zeo - Mechanizer (voice, uncredited)
- Touched by an Angel - Announcer
- VR Troopers - Gunslinger, Rollbot (voices)

=== Film ===
- A Little Help - Parrot
- Barnyard - Cow and Horse
- Bigfoot: The Unforgettable Encounter - Bigfoot Vocal Characterization
- The Call - Additional Voices
- Chicken Little - Male Bear
- Cloudy with a Chance of Meatballs 2 - Additional Voices
- Curious George - Additional Voices
- Dragon Ball: Mystical Adventure - Shinto (Tien) (Harmony Gold dub)
- Dr. Dolittle - Skunk (voice)
- El Hazard: The Magnificent World - Makoto Mizuhara
- El Hazard: The Magnificent World 2 - Makoto Mizuhara
- El Hazard: The Alternative World - Makoto Mizuhara
- Elysium - Various
- Fly Me to the Moon - Commander Aldrin
- From Up on Poppy Hill - Additional Voices (English version)
- Frozen - Crowd Member #2
- Going Under - Guy in Bar
- Her Married Lover - Additional Voices
- Hotel Transylvania - Additional Voices
- Incredibles 2 - Additional Voices
- Kiki's Delivery Service - Tombo (Streamline version only), Additional Voices (both Streamline & Disney dubs)
- Laputa: Castle in the Sky - Henri, Old Engineer (original English dub), Additional voices (both English versions)
- Legends of Oz: Dorothy's Return - Additional Voices
- Life as We Know It - Sports Announcer
- Osmosis Jones - Police Officer of Frank Police Department (voice)
- ParaNorman - Additional Voices (Blithe Hollow Townspeople)
- The Princess and the Frog - New Orleans Man #2
- Pump Up the Volume - Anchor
- Robotech: The Shadow Chronicles - Louis Nichols, Haydonite
- Racing Stripes - Additional Voices
- Roadside Romeo — Additional Voices
- Shaolin Soccer - Additional Voices
- Smother - Ralph
- Street Fighter II: The Animated Movie - Ken Masters (credited as "Ted Richards")
- Tangled - Additional Voices
- The Tale of Despereaux - Additional Voices
- Twilight of the Cockroaches - Airman, Retreat, Walla (English version)
- The Wild - Penguin
- Wildfire - Race Announcer
- Wreck-It Ralph - Additional Voices
- Your Friends and Neighbours - Additional Voices
- Zootopia - Additional Voices

=== Video games ===
- Ace Combat 5: The Unsung War - Chopper
- Ace Combat Zero: The Belkan War - Additional voices (English-dubbed version)
- EverQuest II: Echoes of Faydwer - Mazkeen, Fae_1 emotes (male), Lyrech Human 2 (male)
- Inherit the Earth: Quest for the Orb - Various
- Kessen II - Li Dian (English-dubbed version)
- Medal of Honor - Additional Voices
- Sengoku Basara: Samurai Heroes - Yoshishige Satake (English-dubbed version)
- Seven Samurai 20XX - Epsilon/Epsilon Doll (English-dubbed version)
- Star Trek: Judgment Rites - Lucas, Lt. Kyle, Romulan
- Star Trek: 25th Anniversary - Elasi Captain, Ens. Everts
- Suikoden V - Isato, Roog (English-dubbed version)

=== Stage ===
- Matty: An Evening With Christy Mathewson - Christy Mathewson
