= Mary Elizabeth McGlynn =

American voice actress and musician (born 1966)

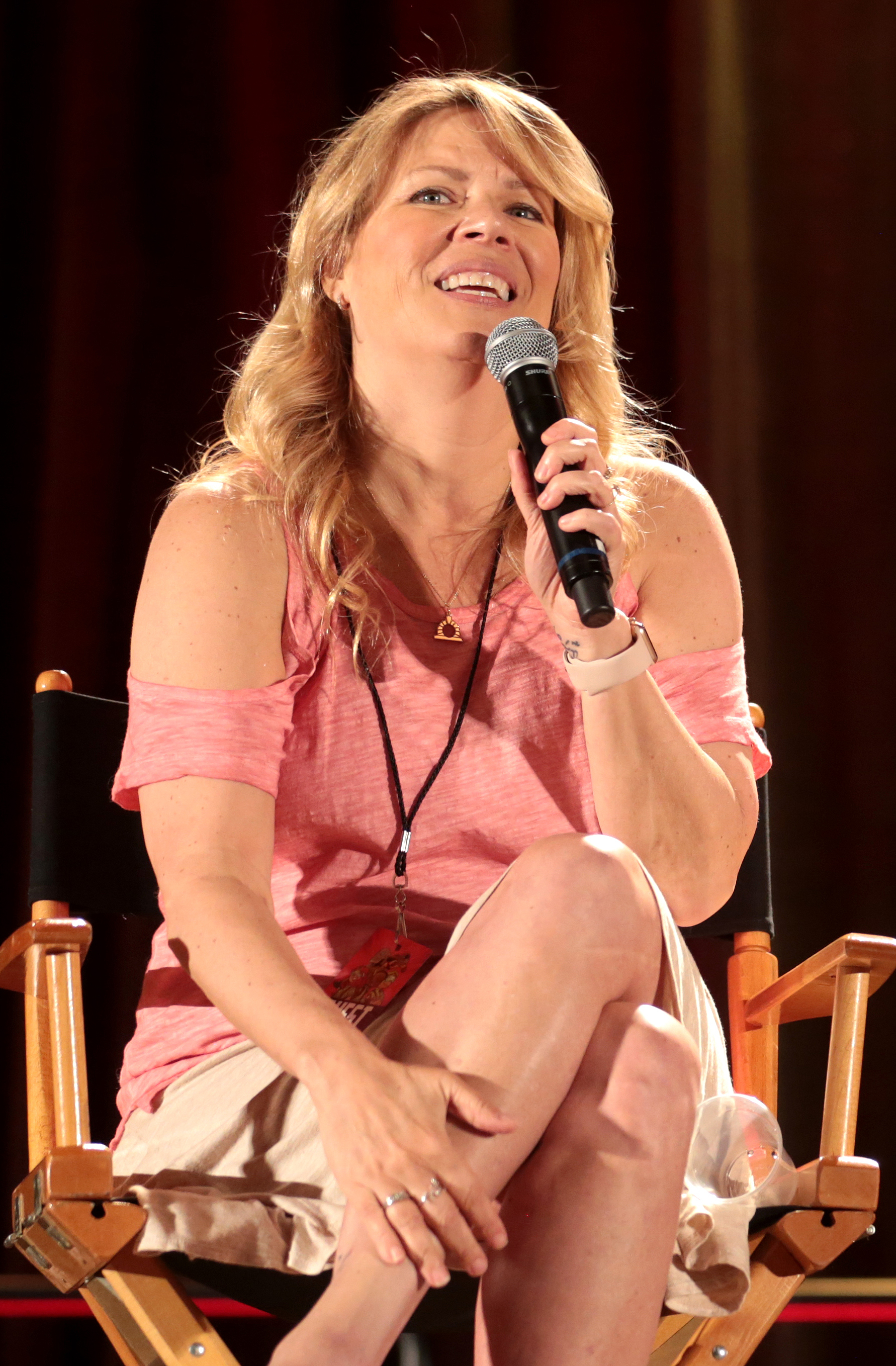
- McGlynn at the 2018 Phoenix Comic Fest
- Born: October 16, 1966 (age 60); Newark, New Jersey, US
- Other name: Melissa Williamson
- Occupations: Voice actress; musician; director
- Years active: 1981–present
- Spouses: Daran Norris (m. 1988; div. 2012); Steve Blum (m. 2017)
- Musical career
- Genres: Pop rock; alternative rock
- Instruments: Vocals; guitar
- Label: Konami Music Entertainment

Mary Elizabeth McGlynn (born October 16, 1966) is an American voice actress, ADR director and musician. She is known for her work in the Ghost in the Shell series, voicing Motoko Kusanagi. She is also known for her involvement in music production in multiple games from the Silent Hill series, and her extensive English-language dubbing of various anime, animated films, and video games, including the English adaptation of the television series Cowboy Bebop.

== Career ==
McGlynn's voice roles in anime include Lieutenant Matilda in the Mobile Suit Gundam I (1981), Motoko Kusanagi (Ghost in the Shell: Stand Alone Complex), Kurenai Yuhi, Mei Terumi, Katsuyu, and Koharu Utatane (from the Naruto series), Cornelia li Britannia (Code Geass), and the most recent, Queen Metalia on Sailor Moon Crystal.

She does voice acting in video games such as Maria and Mary Shepherd-Sunderland in the HD collection version of Silent Hill 2 and Nina Williams from the Tekken series. She has worked in cartoons, with roles such as Dr. Maheswaran in Steven Universe and Steven Universe Future, Abigail Brand in The Avengers: Earth's Mightiest Heroes, Dynamite Watkins and Miss Quantum on OK KO! Let's Be Heroes, Governor Arihnda Pryce in Star Wars Rebels and Coach Brunt in Carmen Sandiego. In addition to her experiences with directing English dubs of anime shows, she also served as a dialogue and voice director for Rapunzel's Tangled Adventure, Penn Zero: Part-Time Hero, She-Ra and the Princesses of Power, Dogs in Space, and Dragon Age: Absolution. She contributed to the Silent Hill movie adaptation and Dance Dance Revolution EXTREME. She has had several movie roles. From 2015 to 2017, she was also a guest star for a Dungeons and Dragons web series titled Critical Role (15 Episodes).

She was a Guest of Honor at Anime Expo 2007, Long Beach.

McGlynn won the 2007 American Anime Award for Best Actress for her role as Major Motoko Kusanagi in Ghost in the Shell: Stand Alone Complex.

She won a Society for the Promotion of Japanese Animation (SPJA) award in 2008 for Best Director for her work on Naruto.

== Personal life ==
McGlynn was married to actor Daran Norris, but divorced him in 2012. As of 2017, she is married to voice actor Steve Blum, whom she directed in various voiceover productions starting with Cowboy Bebop and remained close since then. She has an identical twin sister named Melissa.

== Filmography ==
=== Anime ===
List of dubbing performances in anime
Year	Title	Role	Crew role, notes	Source
1985	Fist of the North Star	Yuria		
1992	Sailor Moon	Flau, Queen Metallia	Viz dub	
1992	Bastard!!	Thunder Empress Arshes Nei		
1997	Street Fighter II V	Dr. Hannah, Newscaster	As Melissa Williamson	CA
1997	Tokyo Revelation	Various characters	As Melissa Williamson	CA
1997–99	El-Hazard series	Queen Diva	As Melissa Williamson	CA
1998	Outlaw Star	Hilda	As Melissa Williamson	Press
1998	Battle Athletes	Lahrri	As Melissa Williamson	CA
1998	Fushigi Yūgi	Nuriko	As Melissa Williamson	Press
1998–99	Cowboy Bebop	Julia	ADR director, as Melissa Williamson	Press
1999	Rurouni Kenshin	Shura	As Melissa Williamson	CA
2000	Sol Bianca: The Legacy	Feb	As Melissa Williamson	CA
2000–01	Digimon Adventure 02	Floramon, Cody's Mother		
2002	Vandread	Jura Basil Elden	As Melissa Williamson	CA
2002	X	Kanoe	As Melissa Williamson	CA
2002	Samurai Girl Real Bout High School	Mian Cubie	As Melissa Williamson	CA
2002	Digimon Tamers	Various characters	ADR director, story editor	Press
2002	Digimon Frontier	Ophanimon, Salamon	ADR director, story editor	
2002–03	Witch Hunter Robin	Jean (doll), Mamoru Kudō, additional voices		
2003	Wolf's Rain	Lady Jaguara	ADR director	Press
2003	Reign: The Conqueror	Cassandra	As Melissa Williamson	CA
2003	.hack//SIGN	Helba		Press
2003	Geneshaft	Sofia Galgalim, Lily Porter		CA
2003–04	Gungrave	Milanda	As Melissa Williamson	
2003–06	Naruto	Kurenai Yūhi, others	ADR director SJPA Award for Best Director	Press
2004–07	Ghost in the Shell: Stand Alone Complex series	Major Motoko Kusanagi	American Anime Award for Best Actress	Press
2007	Digimon Data Squad	Sarah Damon, Sayuri		CA
2008	Code Geass	Cornelia li Britannia		Press
2008–09	Stitch!	Delia	Voice director	
2009	Kurokami	Mikami Houjou		
2009–10	Fullmetal Alchemist: Brotherhood	Briggs Doctor, Doctor's Wife	As Lucy Todd	
2009–12	Bleach	Zabimaru (Baboon), Ikumi Unagiya		Press
2009–16	Naruto: Shippuden	Kurenai Yūhi, others	ADR director	Press
2010-11	Marvel Anime	Marsh, Shehla, Riko Nirasaki, Crowd Member	Voice director, assistant director	
2011	Digimon Fusion	Pickmons, Queen, Shakkoumon, others	Voice director, story editor	Press
2013	Tenkai Knights	Mrs. Dalton (Toxsa's Mother, Ep. 19, uncredited)	ADR director	Press
2013–15	Ghost in the Shell: Arise	Lieutenant Colonel Kurutsu		
2014–15	Marvel Disk Wars: The Avengers		Voice director	
2015	Glitter Force	Brooha, Queen Euphoria, Ms. Mason	Voice director	
2015–16	Sailor Moon Crystal	Queen Metallia		
2016–17	God Eater	Tsubaki Amamiya		
2019	Boruto: Naruto Next Generations	Kurenai Yūhi, Mei Terumī		
2020–22	Ghost in the Shell: SAC 2045	Motoko Kusanagi	Voice director	

=== Animation ===
List of voice performances in animation
Year	Title	Role	Notes	Source
2006–09	The Replacements	Mrs. Zubeck, Mrs. Kelpman	3 episodes	
2012	The Avengers: Earth's Mightiest Heroes	Abigail Brand	3 episodes	
2014–17	Penn Zero: Part-Time Hero		Dialogue Director	Press
2014–18	Steven Universe	Priyanka Maheswaran, others		Press
2016–18	Star Wars Rebels	Governor Arihnda Pryce, others		Tweet
2017–19	OK K.O.! Let's Be Heroes	Dynamite Watkins, Miss Quantum, additional voices		Tweet
2017–20	Rapunzel's Tangled Adventure		Dialogue Director	
2017–20	Dorothy and the Wizard of Oz		Voice director	
2018–18	Bunnicula		Casting Director & Voice Director (season 3)	
2018–20	She-Ra and the Princesses of Power	Horned Goon	Voice director	Press
2018–20	Star Wars Resistance	Freya Fenris, additional voices	Voice director	
2019	Green Eggs and Ham		Voice director (8 episodes)	
2019–21	Carmen Sandiego	Coach Brunt		
2019–22	Dragons: Rescue Riders	Svetlana the Sly	Voice director	
2020	Steven Universe Future	Priyanka Maheswaran	Episode: "Growing Pains"	
2020	Chico Bon Bon: Monkey with a Tool Belt		Voice director	
2020–22	Jurassic World Camp Cretaceous		Voice director (16 episodes)	
2020–22	Doug Unplugs		Voice director	
2021–22	Dogs in Space		Voice director	
2021–23	DreamWorks Dragons: The Nine Realms		Voice director	
2022–25	Bugs Bunny Builders		Voice director	
2022	Big City Greens		Voice director (15 episodes)	
2022	Dragon Age: Absolution		Voice director	
2022–present	The Legend of Vox Machina	Zahra Hydris	Voice director	
2023–23	Shape Island		Voice director	
2023–23	Dew Drop Diaries	Angel	Voice director	
2025–present	The Mighty Nein	Priestess/Clothier	Voice director	

=== Film ===
List of voice performances in direct-to-video and television films
Year	Title	Role	Crew role, notes	Source
1997	Armageddon	Queen Hera	As Melissa Williamson	CA
1999	Black Jack	Jo Carol Brane	As Melissa Williamson	CA
1999	Princess Mononoke		Singer	CA
2000	Vampire Hunter D: Bloodlust	Caroline		Press
2001	Ah! My Goddess: The Movie	Urd	As Melissa Williamson	Press
2001	Metropolis	Public Announcement Voice	ADR script writer	Press
2002	Cowboy Bebop the Movie: Knockin' on Heaven's Door	Chris Riley	ADR director	
2003	Sakura Wars: The Movie	Kanna Kirishima	As Melissa Williamson	CA
2004	Appleseed		ADR director	Press
2004	Ghost in the Shell 2: Innocence	Major Motoko Kusanagi		
2007	Stan Lee's The Condor	Valeria / Taipan		
2008	Resident Evil: Degeneration	Rani's aunt		
2009	Naruto Shippuden the Movie		Voice director	
2010	Naruto Shippuden the Movie: The Lost Tower	Queen Seram		
2011	Tekken: Blood Vengeance	Nina Williams	As Charlotte Bell	
2013	Iron Man: Rise of Technovore		Voice director	
2014	Dragon Ball Z: Battle of Gods	Policewoman		
2015	Ghost in the Shell: Arise	Kurutsu		
2015	The Last: Naruto the Movie	Mei Terumi, Head Maid, Kurenai Yuhi, Katsuyu	Voice director	
2015	Ghost in the Shell: The New Movie	Kurusu		
2017	Resident Evil: Vendetta	Zack White		

=== Video games ===
List of voice performances in video games
Year	Title	Role	Notes	Source
2000	Vampire: The Masquerade – Redemption	Ecaterina		
2001	The Bouncer	Echidna		
2001	Tekken 4	Nina Williams		
2001	Phase Paradox	Renee Hearn, Nash Lynyrd	As Melissa Williamson	
2002	Digimon Rumble Arena	Gatomon, Takato, Magnadramon		
2003–04	.hack series	Helba, Emma Wielant	Infection, Mutation, Outbreak, Quarantine	
2003–12	Silent Hill series		Singer; Voice director	
2004	Vampire: The Masquerade - Bloodlines	Pisha		
2004	Tekken 5	Nina Williams		
2004	Seven Samurai 20XX	Zwei		
2005	Ace Combat 5: The Unsung War		Singer (The Journey Home)	
2005	Devil May Cry 3: Dante's Awakening	Nevan		
2005	Shin Megami Tensei: Digital Devil Saga	Jenna Angel, Jinana		
2006	Rumble Roses XX	Evil Rose, Noble Rose		CA
2006	Dirge of Cerberus: Final Fantasy VII	Rosso		
2006	Xenosaga Episode III: Also sprach Zarathustra	Doctus		
2006–07	.hack//G.U. series	Bordeaux, Toru Uike, News Announcer		
2007	Supreme Commander	General Samantha Clarke		
2007	Supreme Commander: Forged Alliance	General Samantha Clarke		
2008	Devil May Cry 4	Echidna		Website
2008	Spider-Man: Web of Shadows	Spider-Woman		
2009	Afro Samurai	The Polecats		CA
2009	Magna Carta 2	Keitin		
2009	Tekken 6	Nina Williams		Website
2010	Final Fantasy XIII	Nora Estheim		
2010	Alpha Protocol	SIE		
2011–present	Naruto series	Kurenai Yuhi, Shima, Katsuyu, Tsunade, Mei Terumi		
2012	Street Fighter X Tekken	Nina Williams		Website
2012	Darksiders II	Uriel, Nephilim (Whispers) 5, Human Soul 3		
2012	Resident Evil 6	Enemies		
2012	Dishonored		Singer ("Honor For All")	
2012	Marvel Avengers: Battle for Earth	Maria Hill, Veranke		Website
2013	Final Fantasy XIV: A Realm Reborn	Hydaelyn		Website
2013	Marvel Heroes	Jessica Jones, Moondragon		
2014	Diablo III: Reaper of Souls	Female Crusader		Press
2014	Spider-Man Unlimited	Silver Sable		
2014	Digimon All-Star Rumble	Gatomon, Angewomon		
2014	World of Warcraft: Warlords of Draenor	Tyrant Velhari		
2015	Resident Evil: Revelations 2	Alex Wesker		Website
2015	Heroes of the Storm	Johanna		Press
2015	Kholat		Singer (Farewell)	
2015	StarCraft II: Legacy of the Void	Praetor Talis		Press
2015	Xenoblade Chronicles X	Avatar (Female Mature)	Grouped under Avatars	
2016	Ghost in the Shell: Stand Alone Complex - First Assault Online	Major Motoko Kusanagi		
2016	Hitman	Dalia Margolis		
2016	Lego Star Wars: The Force Awakens	Sausage Vendor		
2016	God Eater Resurrection	Tsubaki Amamiya		Website
2016	Tekken 7: Fated Retribution	Nina Williams	Uncredited (Note: English voice actors were not listed in the closing credits for this title.)	Website
2016	World of Warcraft: Legion	Aegwynn, Delas Moonfang		
2017	Star Trek: Bridge Crew	Lieutenant Koharu Mori		
2018	Artifact	Prellex		
2019	Mortal Kombat 11	Cetrion		Tweet
2019	Marvel Ultimate Alliance 3: The Black Order	Valkyrie		
2020	World of Warcraft: Shadowlands	Remornia		
2020	Resident Evil: Resistance	Alex Wesker		
2023	Stray Gods: The Roleplaying Musical	Persephone		
2023	Mortal Kombat 1	Female Scorpion		
2023	Mortal Kombat: Onslaught	Cetrion		
2024	Tekken 8	Nina Williams		
2024	Clock Tower: Rewind		Singer (Intro)	Tweet
2025	Xenoblade Chronicles X: Definitive Edition	Avatar (Female Mature), additional voices		
2025	Date Everything!	Airyn, Isolde		

=== Audio books ===
List of voice performances in Audio books
Year	Title	Role	Notes	Source
2020	The World of Critical Role	Narrator		

=== Live action ===
List of acting performances in television and film
Year	Title	Role	Crew role, notes	Source
1992	Down the Shore	Brigitte	Episode: "A Tale of Two Houses"	
1993	Quantum Leap	Sue Anne Winters	Episode: "Memphis Melody"	
1994	Walker, Texas Ranger	Merrilee Summers	Episode: "Right Man, Wrong Time"	
1995	Xena: Warrior Princess	Pandora	Episode: "Cradle of Hope"	
1996	Murder, She Wrote	Karen Reisner	Episode: "Mrs. Parker's Revenge"	
1997	Sister, Sister	Dr. Wilcox	Episode: "Two's Company"	
1998	Star Trek: Voyager	Daelen	Episode: "Vis a Vis"	
2006	Silent Hill		Singer	
2008	Adventures in Voice Acting	Herself		
2011	Julia X 3D		Singer	
