= Ishimura (surname) =

Ishimura is a Japanese surname. Notable people with the surname include:

- Maiha Ishimura (born 1992), Japanese singer
- Tomoko Ishimura (born 1972), Japanese voice actress
