= Tetsuya Iwanaga (voice actor) =

Japanese voice actor

- Other names: Tetchan Tetsu; Tetsu-kun
- Occupation: Voice actor
- Years active: 1990s–present

Tetsuya Iwanaga (岩永 哲哉, Iwanaga Tetsuya) is a Japanese voice actor.

== Filmography ==
=== Television animation ===
- Genji Tsūshin Agedama (1991) (Suzuki)
- Aoki Densetsu Shoot! (1994) (Sawaguchi, Katsuhisa Takahashi)
- Tottemo! Luckyman (1994) (Superstarman)
- Jura Tripper (1995) (O-Taku)
- Fushigi Yûgi (1995) (Tomite)
- Romeo's Blue Skies (1995) (Benalibo Marco)
- Neon Genesis Evangelion (1995) (Kensuke Aida)
- El-Hazard (1995) (Makoto Mizuhara)
- Wild Knights Gulkeeva (1995) (Shinjou Touya)
- Slayers (1995) (Hallas Ryzu)
- H2 (1996) (Tetsu Sagawa)
- Virtua Fighter (1996) (Lion Rafale)
- Chūka Ichiban! (1997) (Tan Sanche)
- Fancy Lala (1998) (Imaichi)
- Gasaraki (1998) (Jun Kitazawa)
- Princess Nine (1998) (Seishiro Natsume)
- St. Luminous Mission High School (1998) (Kaihei Kijima)
- Haré+Guu (2001) (Wiggle)
- s-CRY-ed (2001) (Asuka Tachibana)
- Yu-Gi-Oh! Duel Monsters (2001) (Marik Ishtar)
- Crush Gear Turbo (2002) (Sean Firestone)
- Ghost in the Shell: Stand Alone Complex (2003) (J·D)
- Tsubasa Chronicle (2006) (Souseki)
- Detective Conan (2006) (Hidehiko Nakazato)
- Angelique (2007) (Sei-lan)
- Kaiba (2008) (Kichi, Bori, Kera)
- Puella Magi Madoka Magica (2011) (Tomohisa Kaname)

=== OVA ===
- El-Hazard (1995) (Makoto Mizuhara)
- Birdy the Mighty (1996) (Tsutomu Senkawa)
- Rurouni Kenshin: Trust & Betrayal (1999) (Kiyosato Akira)
- Locke the Superman: Mirror Ring (2000) (Lan Svensen)

=== Theatrical animation ===
- Memories (1995) (Nobuo's Younger Brother)
- Crayon Shin-chan: Pursuit of the Balls of Darkness (1997) (Gorobe)
- Crayon Shin-chan: Explosion! The Hot Spring's Feel Good Final Battle (1999) (Killer Joe Finger)
- Crayon Shin-chan: The Storm Called The Jungle (2000) (Navigator)
- Evangelion: 1.0 You Are (Not) Alone (2007) (Kensuke Aida)
- Evangelion: 2.0 You Can (Not) Advance (2009) (Kensuke Aida)
- s-CRY-ed Alteration Tao (2011) (Asuka Tachibana)
- Puella Magi Madoka Magica Part 1: Beginnings (2012) (Tomohisa Kaname)
- Puella Magi Madoka Magica Part 2: Eternal (2012) (Tomohisa Kaname)
- Evangelion: 3.0+1.0 Thrice Upon a Time (2021) (Kensuke Aida)

=== Tokusatsu ===
- Chōriki Sentai Ohranger (1995) (Bara Pino-killer (ep. 14))

=== Video games ===
- Street Fighter series (xxxx-xx) (Ken Masters)
- Angelique (xxxx) (Seiran)
- Langrisser V: The End of Legend (1998) (Alfred)
- Neon Genesis Evangelion: Girlfriend of Steel (xxxx) (Kensuke Aida)
- Neon Genesis Evangelion: Girlfriend of Steel 2nd (xxxx) (Kensuke Aida)
- Namco x Capcom (xxxx) (Ken Masters and Guy)
- Street Fighter Alpha series (xxxx-xx) (Guy)
- Valkyrie Profile (xxxx) (Kashel, Roy, and Roland)
- Valkyrie Profile: Lenneth (xxxx) (Kashel, Roy, and Roland)
- Fushigi Yūgi Genbu Kaiden Gaiden: Kagami no Miko (xxxx) (Tomite)
- Ikemen Genjiden: Ayakashi koi enishi (2022) (Sutokuin/Akihito)

=== Drama CDs ===
- 3 Ji Kara Koi wo Suru series 4: Gozen 0 Ji Ai no Sasayaki (Ryoutarou Fujishiba)
- 3 Ji Kara Koi wo Suru series 6 (crossover with Analyst no Yuutsu series): Ai to Yokubou no Kinyuugai (Ryoutarou Fujishiba)
- Abunai Series 2: Abunai Summer Vacation (Izumi Sudou)
- Abunai Series 4: Abunai Campus Love (Shino Nanba)
- Abunai Series side story 1: Abunai Ura Summer Vacation (Izumi Sudou)
- Analyst no Yuutsu series 2: Koi no Risk wa Hansenai (Ryoutarou Fujishiba)
- Analyst no Yuutsu series 4 (crossover with 3 Ji Kara Koi wo Suru series): Ai to Yokubou no Kinyuugai (Ryoutarou Fujishiba)
- Fushigi Yūgi Genbu Kaiden (Chamuka Tan - Tomite)
- Hello!! Doctor (Yuuya Mizushima)
- Kiken ga Ippai (Tanaka)
- Muteki na Anoko (Tamoo Tateno)
- Otawamure wo Prince (Touru Enami)
- Soryamou Aideshou series 1 and 2 (Muzuki Kurokawa)
- Tokyo Junk 1 and 2 (Masaki Okamoto)

=== Dubbing ===
==== Live-action ====
- Growing Pains (Michael Aaron "Mike" Seaver (Kirk Cameron))
- Hackers (Joey Pardella (Jesse Bradford))
- Indiana Jones and the Last Crusade (Young Indiana Jones (River Phoenix))
- The Deep End of the Ocean (Vincent Cappadora (Jonathan Jackson))

==== Animation ====
- Invasion America (Jim Bailey)
- Tarzan (Flynt)
- Transformers: Beast Wars (Airazor)
- X-Men: The Animated Series (Leech)
