= Yoko Soumi =

Japanese actress (born 1962)

- 沢海 陽子
- Born: May 31, 1962 (age 64); Niigata Prefecture, Japan
- Occupations: Actress; voice actress
- Years active: 1987–present
- Agent: Kakehi Production
- Notable work: Shaman King as Lyserg Diethel; Fullmetal Alchemist: Brotherhood as Olivier Mira Armstrong; Tenchu as Ayame; YuYu Hakusho as Atsuko Urameshi
- Spouse: Akio Ōtsuka (m. 2005; div. 2008)

Yoko Soumi (沢海 陽子, Soumi Yōko; born May 31, 1962) is a Japanese actress and voice actress associated with Kakehi Production (formerly Mausu Promotion). She was born in Niigata Prefecture. She and fellow voice actor Akio Ōtsuka married on February 11, 2005, but they divorced three years later.

== Filmography ==
=== Anime ===
Year	Series	Role	Notes	Source
1992	Yu Yu Hakusho	Atsuko Urameshi		
1995	El-Hazard	Diva	OVA and TV series	
1995	Gunsmith Cats	Natasha Radinov		
1995	Juuni Senshi Bakuretsu Eto Ranger	Urii, Chocolat/Nyanma		
1997	Battle Athletes Victory	Ayla V. Roznovsky		
1998	Blue Submarine No. 6	Frida Verasco		
1998	Trigun	Dominique the Cyclops		
1998	Virgin Fleet	Nikola Papillo		
2000	Hidamari no Ki	Otsune		
2001	Earth Maiden Arjuna	Teresa Wong		
2001	Shaman King	Kanna Bismarch, Lyserg Diethel		
2001	Vandread	Buzam A. Calessa		
2001	X	Karen Kasumi	OVA and TV series	
2002	Ghost in the Shell SAC			
2003	Astro Boy			
2004	Black Jack			
2004	Fafner in the Azure	Yukie Kariya		
2005	Eureka Seven	Mischa		
2006	Bleach	Yoshi		
2006	Coyote Ragtime Show	Madame Marciano		
2006	Ergo Proxy	Derrida		
2006	Happy Lucky Bikkuriman	Nero Queen		
2007	Oh! Edo Rocket	Sekichi Tamaya		
2007	Yes! PreCure 5	Arachnea		
2008	Hellsing Ultimate	Zorin Blitz		
2009	Fullmetal Alchemist: Brotherhood	Olivier Mira Armstrong		
2016	Super Lovers	Mikiko Kashiwagi		
2016	Tenchi Muyo! Ryo-Ohki	Mikami Kuramitsu (OVA 4)		
2018	A Certain Magical Index III	Elizard		
2018	Pokémon	Ellen, Naoya, Kaede, Atsuo, Hiroki/Takuya		
2018	Case Closed	Various characters		
2021	Log Horizon: Destruction of the Round Table	Leaf Lotus Nymph		
2021	Shaman King	Lyserg Diethel		
2022	Lycoris Recoil	Kusunoki		
2023	Birth of Kitarō: The Mystery of GeGeGe		Film	
2025	MF Ghost	Grandma Saionji	TV Series	
2026	Daemons of the Shadow Realm	Minase Ono		

=== Drama CDs ===
Year	Series	Role	Notes	Source
	Angel Sanctuary	Belial		
	Hana no Asuka-gumi!	Hibari		
1999	Initial D Extra Edition ~ Lonely Driver Legend	Mika Katsuragi		

=== Video games ===
Year	Series	Role	Notes	Source
1996	Battle Athletes	Ira Velaska Rosnovski		
2001	Di Gi Charat Fantasy	Erika	and Excellent version	
1997	Digital Ange	Kurearideru		
1997	Dragon Knight 4	Kurea, Lyida Kuraudeisu		
2006	Final Fantasy XII	Drace		
2002	Galaxy Angel	Sherry Bristol		
1997	Lego Island	Laura Brick		
2002	Onimusha 2: Samurai's Destiny	Oyu		
1993	Quantum Gate	Sergeant Crenshaw		
1998	Tenchu series	Ayame		
2013	Tomb Raider	Reyes	Voice dub for Tanya Alexander in Japanese version	
2022	AI: The Somnium Files – Nirvana Initiative	Tokiko Shigure		
2023	Octopath Traveler II	Lady Clarissa		

=== Dubbing ===
==== Live-action ====
Series	Role	Notes	Source
Cameron Diaz
My Best Friend's Wedding	Kimmy Wallace		
Fear and Loathing in Las Vegas	Blonde TV Reporter	New DVD/BD editions	
Charlie's Angels	Natalie Cook		
The Sweetest Thing	Kristina Waters		
Bad Teacher	Elizabeth Halsey		
Sex Tape	Annie Hargrove		
Others
.45	Liz	Voice dub for Aisha Tyler	
Andromeda	Beka Valentine	Voice dub for Lisa Ryder	
Angel Baby	Kate		
The Assignment	Maura Ramirez	Voice dub for Claudia Ferri	
Basic Instinct	Dr. Beth Garner	1997 NTV edition, voice dub for Jeanne Tripplehorn	
Beverly Hills, 90210	Clare Arnold	Voice dub for Kathleen Robertson	
Blade	Mercury	Voice dub for Arly Jover	
The Bourne Supremacy	Nicky Parsons	Voice dub for Julia Stiles	
The Bourne Ultimatum	Nicky Parsons	Voice dub for Julia Stiles	
Buffalo Girls	Dora DuFran	1999 NHK edition, voice dub for Melanie Griffith	
Bulletproof	Dr. Traci Flynn	Voice dub for Kristen Wilson	
Call Me by Your Name	Annella Perlman	Voice dub for Amira Casar	
Committed	Carmen	Voice dub for Patricia Velásquez	
The Crow	Myca	Voice dub for Bai Ling; 1997 TV Tokyo edition	
Cyrus	Jamie	Voice dub for Catherine Keener	
Dallas	Pam Ewing	Voice dub for Victoria Principal	
Devious Maids	Marisol		
Dharma & Greg	Jane Deaux		
ER	Chuny Marquez	Voice dub for Laura Cerón	
The General's Daughter	Elisabeth Campbell	Voice dub for Leslie Stefanson	
Gladiator	Lucilla	Voice dub for Connie Nielsen	
Gladiator II	Lucilla	Voice dub for Connie Nielsen	
Going the Distance	Corrine Berlin	Voice dub for Christina Applegate	
Gone Girl	Detective Rhonda Boney	Voice dub for Kim Dickens	
Grey's Anatomy	Cristina Yang	Voice dub for Sandra Oh	
Jason Bourne	Nicky Parsons	Voice dub for Julia Stiles	
Jesse Stone: Death in Paradise	Lilly Summers	Voice dub for Orla Brady	
The Josephine Baker Story	Josephine Baker		
Kalifornia	Carrie Laughlin	Voice dub for Michelle Forbes	
Killing Eve	Eve Polastri	Voice dub for Sandra Oh	
A Man Apart	Stacy Vetter	Voice dub for Jacqueline Obradors	
Murder at 1600	Nina Chance	Voice dub for Diane Lane	
Murder by Numbers	Det. Cassie Mayweather	Voice dub for Sandra Bullock	
My Big Fat Greek Wedding	Fotoula "Toula" Portokalos	Voice dub for Nia Vardalos	
My Life in Ruins	Georgia Ianakopolis	Voice dub for Nia Vardalos	
My Super Ex-Girlfriend	Jenny Johnson/G-Girl	Voice dub for Uma Thurman	
Next	Special Agent Callie Ferris	Voice dub for Julianne Moore	
Ocean's Twelve	Isabel Lahiri	Voice dub for Catherine Zeta-Jones	
Out of Time	Alex Diaz-Whitlock	Voice dub for Eva Mendes	
Pistol Whipped	Drea Smalls	Voice dub for Renée Elise Goldsberry	
Playing by Heart	The Lawyer	Voice dub for Nastassja Kinski	
Quartet	Marya Zelli	Voice dub for Isabelle Adjani	
The Running Man	Amber Méndez	Voice dub for María Conchita Alonso; DVD edition	
The Secret of My Success	Vera Pemrose Prescott	Voice dub for Margaret Whitton; Netflix edition	
Shooter	Alourdes Galindo	Voice dub for Rhona Mitra	
Silent Hill	Cybil Bennett	Voice dub for Laurie Holden	
Some Kind of Beautiful	Olivia	Voice dub for Salma Hayek	
Stage Fright	Charlotte Inwood	Voice dub for Marlene Dietrich	
Star Trek: The Next Generation	Tasha Yar	Voice dub for Denise Crosby	
Star Trek: Voyager	Seven of Nine	Voice dub for Jeri Ryan	
Star Trek: Picard	Seven of Nine	Voice dub for Jeri Ryan	
The Talented Mr. Ripley	Meredith Logue	Voice dub for Cate Blanchett	
Taxi	Petra	Voice dub for Emma Sjöberg	
The Third Man	Anna Schmidt	Voice dub for Alida Valli	
Toothless	Dr. Katherine Lewis	Voice dub for Kirstie Alley	
'Til There Was You	Gwen Moss	Voice dub for Janine Tripplehorn	
Trust the Man	Elaine	Voice dub for Maggie Gyllenhaal	
Twelfth Night: Or What You Will	Viola		
Twin Peaks: Fire Walk with Me	Ronette Pulaski; Annie Blackburn	Voice dub for Phoebe Augustine; Voice dub for Heather Graham	
Velvet Goldmine	Mandy Slade	Voice dub for Toni Collette	
Veronica's Closet	Veronica Chase	Voice dub for Kirstie Alley	
War Room	Elizabeth Jordan	Voice dub for Priscilla Shirer	
Welcome to Sarajevo	Nina	Voice dub for Marisa Tomei	
The X-Files	Marita Covarrubias		

==== Animation ====
Series	Role	Notes	Source
Fly Me to the Moon	Nadia		
Spider-Man: Into the Spider-Verse	May Parker		
Strange World	Callisto Mal		
