= St. Luminous Mission High School =

Japanese anime television series

聖ルミナス女学院
- Anime television series
- Directed by: Tetsurō Amino
- Produced by: GENCO
- Music by: Mikiya Katakura
- Studio: Triangle Staff
- Original network: TV Tokyo
- Original run: 5 October 1998 – 30 December 1998
- Episodes: 13

St. Luminous Mission High School (聖ルミナス女学院, Sento Ruminasu Jogakuin) is a 1998 13-episode anime television series produced by GENCO and animated by Triangle Staff.

== Story ==
When his grandfather dies, Kaihei inherits the post of chairman at an eccentric private girls' school which emphasises the personal freedom of its students. But he arrives to find that one of the students has gone missing. As he investigates Melina's disappearance more students vanish, strange events occur and his position is placed under increasing pressure from teachers and parents.

== Characters ==
Kaihei Kijima (木島 海平, Kijima Kaihei)

Voiced by: Tetsuya Iwanaga

The boy who's appointed chairman of a girls' school, and must investigate the disappearances
Ryuzo Tanami (田波 龍三, Tanami Ryūzō)

Voiced by: Souichiro Hoshi

Kaihei's friend, who must pretend to be a girl to enroll at St Luminous
Sister Akane (シスター 茜, Shisutā Akane)

Voiced by: Mifuyu Hiiragi

One of the nuns who run St Luminous
22 years old
Noriko Kijima (木島 糊湖, Kijima Noriko)

Voiced by: Mayumi Iizuka

Kaihei's cousin
Elizabeth Ryoko Bryan (エリザベス 良子 ブライアン, Erisabesu Ryōko Buraian)

Voiced by: Asako Dodo

Noriko's friend
Melina Scafissi (メリナ・スカフィシ, Merina Sukafishi)

Voiced by: Yuko Sumitomo

first girl to go missing
Asako Sato (佐藤 朝子, Satō Asako)

Voiced by: Shiho Kikuchi

Often abandons campus to surf
Shanon De Pye (シャノン・デ・パイ, Shanon de Pai)

Voiced by: Yumi Takada

22-year-old pianist who attempts to summon UFOs
Yukine Koushinzuka (庚申塚 ゆきね, Kōshinzuka Yukine)

Voiced by: Ai Uchikawa

Dealer in fragrances
Irina Goinov (イリーナ・ゴワノブ, Irīna Gowanobu)

Voiced by: Nami Miyahara

Cathrine Deboucoillet (カトリーヌ・ドブクワイエ, Katarīna Dobukuwaie)

Voiced by: Yuu Asakawa

An artist
Lita Ford (リタ・フォード, Rita Fodo)

Voiced by: Yui Horie

President of the broadcast club
Maako, Mei, Dona
reporters for the broadcast club, also known as "The Three Mermaids"
Sheryl Ringwald (シェール・リングウォルド, Sheru Ringuworudo)

Voiced by: Mariko Suzuki

Ringwald believes she was abducted by aliens
Fumiko Makuragi (枕木 史子, Makuragi Fumiko)

Voiced by: Chiharu Tezuka

== Episodes ==
#	Title (Kanji)	Title (Romaji)	Translation
1	ぼくはどこへ向かうのか?	Boku wa doko e mukau no ka?	Where am I headed?
2	なぜぼくはここにいるのか?	Naze boku wa koko ni iru no ka?	Why am I here?
3	誰も知らないところへ...	Dare mo shiranai tokoro he...	To a place nobody knows...
4	自由があるとしたら...?	Jiyuu ga aru to shitara...?	If there is freedom...?
5	恋も消えるのか?	Koi mo kieru no ka?	Does love vanish too?
6	白い影を追って...	Shiroi kage wo otte...	Chasing the white shadow...
7	森へ...	Mori he...	Into the forest...
8	風は何を運ぶのか?	Kaze wa nani wo hakobu no ka?	What does the wind carry?
9	なぜ思いは...	Naze omoi wa...	Why is the thought...
10	何かが変わってゆく...	Nani ka ga kawatte yuku...	Something's changing...
11	誰かがそこにいるとしたら...	Dare ka ga soko ni iru to shitara...	If somebody's there...
12	消えずに残っていたもの...	Kiezu ni nokotte ita mono...	Things remaining amidst the disappearance...
13	ぼくは何故ここにいるのか	Boku wa naze koko ni iru no ka	Why am I here?
