= Tomoko Ishimura =

Japanese voice actress (born 1972)

Tomoko Ishimura (石村 知子, Ishimura Tomoko; born February 24, 1972 in Zama, Kanagawa, Japan) is a Japanese voice actress who works for 81 Produce. She was formerly credited as Mifuyu Hiiragi (柊 美冬, Hiiragi Mifuyu) and Kyoko Tsuruno (鶴野 恭子, Tsuruno Kyōko).

== Notable filmography ==
- Dante in Romeo's Blue Skies (1995)
- Rumiya in Magical Girl Pretty Sammy (1995)
- Princess Fatora in El Hazard (1995)
- Kenta in Brave Command Dagwon: The Boy With The Crystal Eyes (1996)
- Martina Xoana Mel Navratilova in Slayers Next (1996)
- Ryousuke Shiroyama, Kensuke Watanabe in You're Under Arrest (TV series) (1996)
- Mimi in Buttobi CPU (1997)
- Chisa Shinohara in Fancy Lala (1998)
- Millienium Feria Nocturne in Lost Universe (1998)
- Larry (young) in Silent Möbius (1998)
- Sister Akane in St. Luminous Mission High School (1998)
- Saeno Hiiragi in Seraphim Call (1999)
- Kyoko-chan in Hamtaro (2000)
- Eris Williamette in Gear Fighter Dendoh (2000)

Unknown date

- Raichi in Mirmo!
- Sho Aizawa in Figure 17
- Tokuzo Sugiura in Chibi Maruko-chan
- Dizzy in Bob the Builder
- Kinako Monaka in Magical Nyan Nyan Taruto
- Chisao Ohyama in Rockman.EXE series
- Megumi Shinohara in Future GPX Cyber Formula SAGA
- Emperor Rudolf Gerhard Zeppelin III in Zoids: Chaotic Century
- Roan in Grandia II
- Tsubasa in Matantei Loki Ragnarok (episoden: 3 und 13)
- Kytes in Final Fantasy XII: Revenant Wings
