= List of El-Hazard characters =

The following article provides information on major and minor characters in the fictional universe of the various El-Hazard anime and manga series. If a character's existence differs significantly in the alternate timeline Wanderers TV series, these differences will also be noted. The names are listed in western order, with surnames following given names.

== Primary characters ==
=== Makoto Mizuhara ===
Voiced by: Tetsuya Iwanaga (Japanese); Eddie Frierson (English)

Seventeen-year-old Makoto Mizuhara (水原 誠 Mizuhara Makoto) is the protagonist of the story. At the beginning of the first OVA, Makoto is to testify against student body president Katsuhiko Jinnai in an impeachment hearing. After school, Jinnai attacks him in an effort to prevent his testimony when time comes to a standstill. Making his way down to some ancient ruins underneath the school, Makoto discovers a mysterious, beautiful woman who sends him and the others still on the school campus to the world of El-Hazard.

Once in El-Hazard, Makoto meets up with his history teacher, Masamichi Fujisawa, and after a brief encounter with some Bugrom soldiers, the two rescue Princess Rune Venus of Roshtaria, who had been traveling to learn news of her missing sister, Fatora. As it turns out, Makoto bears an uncanny resemblance to the missing princess, and he's reluctantly recruited into impersonating Fatora. He goes along with the plan, hoping that doing so will allow him access to the Eye of God, which might have the power to return him to Earth. Over the course of the series, he becomes enthralled with Ifurita, and is oblivious to the advances that Nanami and Shayla-Shayla both make on him.

After Ifurita is catapulted far away into time and space, Makoto vows to uncover the secrets of the Eye of God in order to come rescue her. It apparently takes him several years to do so; when Makoto appears before Ifurita at the end of the first OVA, he seems to be in his late teens or early twenties.

Makoto's journey from Earth to El-Hazard endowed him with a special ability to activate and link with ancient devices of a lost El-Hazard civilization, including the Eye of God and the Demon God, Ifurita.

Makoto is notable as one of the few "harem anime" protagonists who actually becomes romantically involved with one of his admirers. Additionally, in the first OVA he showcases a certain strength of character, also notable among mostly weak-willed, sturdy-as-wet-cardboard harem leads. (Later series stripped him of these traits, returning him to "standard issue".)

Makoto in The Wanderers

Although considered more of an everyman in the OVA series, The Wanderers paints Makoto as more scientifically gifted. In the series, he creates a machine in the science lab to be on display at the start of the school's cultural festival, but when Jinnai sabotages it, it creates a portal to El-Hazard, pulling them in along with Nanami and Fujisawa. Because Fatora is not a part of The Wanderers, Makoto is never forced into impersonating her.

Enoki Films had planned to give Makoto the dub name "Mako" in its license.

=== Masamichi Fujisawa ===
Voiced by: Kouji Ishii (Japanese); Michael Sorich (English)

Masamichi Fujisawa (藤沢 真理 Fujisawa Masamichi) is the alcoholic, chain-smoking history teacher at Shinonome High School.

Fujisawa is not widely respected among his students and has a very strong sense of school spirit. When he crosses over into El-Hazard, he gains super strength and athletic ability; he loses these powers if he has consumed too much alcohol. Also, if he does not smoke for a period of time, the stress amplifies his powers exponentially. Despite his vices, he is a good-hearted individual and a mountaineering enthusiast, which comes in useful whenever there is a mountain or cliff face to climb. He also gains the romantic interest of Miz Mishtal, but he is not quite sure how to handle the attention at first.

Fujisawa in The Wanderers

Fujisawa does not change very much, but his love of mountain climbing is emphasized a bit more than it is in the first OVA series. Also, he is not a smoker in this series and thus his "super" state doesn't exist.

Enoki Films had planned to give Fujisawa the dub name "Mr. Fuji" in its license.

=== Katsuhiko Jinnai ===
Voiced by: Ryotaro Okiayu (Japanese); R. Martin Klein (English)

Katsuhiko Jinnai (陣内 克彦 Jinnai Katsuhiko) is the chief antagonist of the story.

Before his journey to El Hazard, Katsuhiko manages to win the student body presidential election by promising student government funds to campus clubs and organizations that voted for him. When Makoto catches wind of this and plans are made for him to testify against Jinnai (who is called "Jinnai" by everyone except his sister), the egocentric, power-hungry and soon-to-be-impeached student body president attempts to thwart the process by attacking Makoto, intending to keep him tied up until a technicality in the bylaws prevents him from being thrown out of office. Before he can execute his plan, however, he's sent to El-Hazard, and once there encounters the Bugrom, a race of human-sized insectoid beings ruled by Queen Diva.

Jinnai's power granted to him by the trip is the ability to communicate with the Bugrom, allowing him to become their military commander under their belief that he is the messenger from God sent to lead the Bugrom to victory. A skilled tactician, he is able to reorganize the Bugrom forces into an effective army and comes close to conquering El-Hazard.

Although Jinnai is a power-hungry egomaniac, he's not without some level of humanity. When Galus attempts to stop Makoto and the others from halting the Eye of God's apocalyptic malfunction, he takes the leader of the Phantom Tribe by surprise with the help of a Bugrom soldier. Although Jinnai effectively comes to Makoto and Nanami's rescue, he does so more for the fact that a "true ruler doesn't destroy the land he wishes to conquer". Jinnai has a very distinctive laugh.

Jinnai suffers from an obsession with Makoto that borders of the psychotic. Over the course of both series, he consistently blames Makoto for essentially every single failure and disappointment he experiences. His sense of his own history is a montage of misfortune, the chief architect of which is Makoto. Though generally megalomaniacal, one of his primary motivations in gaining power is to subsequently gain the ability to best, or, even kill him.

Perhaps due to his megalomania, Jinnai has tremendous confidence in himself and his abilities. He allows little to faze or depress him, and is quick to bounce back from any setbacks. Even at the end of the original OAV series, where the Bugrom empire has apparently been reduced to himself, Diva and his personal squad, he never falters and instead vows that they will find the ideal place to construct a new colony, building themselves back up into a powerful force. In El Hazard 2, Jinnai discovers a mesa deep in the desert where he declares that they shall settle, while in The Alternative World the colony begins to be repopulated - firstly by bands of surviving Bugrom, then at the climax, where Diva takes the shocked Jinnai as her mate so that she can breed new Bugrom.

Jinnai in The Wanderers

Jinnai does not change much in the transition from OVA to TV series, either, but he seems to treat Ifurita with more care. Although he's threatened with impeachment from his position as student body president at the beginning of the series and Makoto plays no direct role in the trial, he is paranoid that Makoto will replace him as president once he is kicked out of office.

Additionally, Jinnai reveals a softer side at the end of the series, showing a certain fatherly affection towards Ifurita after she stops the Eye of God from plowing into Roshtaria.

Enoki Films had planned to give Jinnai the dub name "Jimbo" in its license.

=== Nanami Jinnai ===
Voiced by: Rio Natsuki (Japanese); Lia Sargent (English)

Nanami Jinnai (陣内 菜々美 Jinnai Nanami) is Jinnai's younger sister by about a year.

Nanami is highly independent and strongly entrepreneurial, going so far as to take payment from the high school's Broadcast Club to grill her brother over the fraudulent election results on campus television. When she's sent to El-Hazard, she's initially alone and is forced to take on a waitressing job to earn enough money to travel, but she eventually meets up with Makoto and Fujisawa at the Fountain of Arliman, where she is able to start a small business selling boxed lunches to the visiting priestesses. Nanami has feelings for Makoto, but she's never really had the opportunity to talk about a relationship with him. Her feelings also engage her in a running feud with Shayla-Shayla over Makoto's hand.

Nanami's power gained upon entering El-Hazard is to see through the illusions of the Phantom Tribe, making her a viable defense against the greatest threat in the first OVA series.

Nanami in The Wanderers

The Phantom Tribe does not exist in the alternate timeline, and so instead Nanami has the same power to communicate with the Bugrom as her brother. Her past relationship with Makoto is also explored a bit more in detail, and she becomes good friends with Princess Rune Venus. As well, in the last episode of the TV series, Alielle describes Nanami and herself as "special friends", lending their relationship a certain homoerotic subtext, though this seems to be more along the lines of a big sister relationship.

Enoki Films had planned to give Nanami the dub name "Nana" in its license.

=== Ifurita ===
Voiced by: Yuri Amano/Maria Kawamura (OVA 2) (Japanese); Tiffany James (OVA 1), Debra Jean Rogers (OVA 2), Julie Ann Taylor (Wanderers) (English)

Ifurita (イフリータ Ifurīta; spelled "Ifreeta" in the Etranger Tour Guide; possibly a reference to an ifritah, or female ifrit) is an ancient Demon God of El-Hazard. Although the specifics of her origin are never explained, it appears as though she is a biological machine designed to look like a beautiful young woman. When Makoto first encounters her under the high school, she seems to know him for some reason, and treats him warmly. However, later in the series, when Makoto and the others reach the Island of the Demon God, he discovers her still asleep, as she had been for centuries. Jinnai uses the Power Key Staff to wind-up Ifurita, awakening her, and because he is the master of the staff, she emotionlessly does his bidding. She has the destructive power to level entire cities, and because of her status as an ancient weapon she has knowledge of all the "ancient techniques" that the priestesses use and can therefore duplicate any attack or technique that's used against her, truly making her the most fearsome weapon in all of El-Hazard.

On occasions when Makoto's power allows his mind to synchronize with hers, she becomes aware that he somehow knows her, despite having never met him before. This leads her to question her existence as a weapon. When Makoto eventually disables the obedience circuit within her, she becomes free of Jinnai's control. At the end of the first OVA series, the Eye of God goes out of control, and she gives Makoto her staff, allowing her to tap into his power to control ancient technology. In stopping the Eye of God, Ifurita is thrown through time and space for thousands of years, eventually coming to rest under what would later become the site of Shinonome High School. After sending Makoto and the others to El-Hazard, she wanders the school, taking in memories that Makoto had passed along to her, and sadly leans against the fence outside the school as the sun rises, when a slightly older looking Makoto appears. After ten thousand years, the two are reunited with the key to recharge her and the ability to return to El-Hazard together.

In El-Hazard 2, there is another, identical looking Ifurita, belonging to a man called Yuba, another dimension-traveller who shares Makoto's powers.

Ifurita in The Wanderers

Ifurita underwent a complete makeover in The Wanderers. The tragic, mystifying and fearsome Demon God was given a totally different personality, making her a bubble-headed ditz along the lines of Mihoshi from Tenchi Muyo! She also underwent a major physical redesign, changing costume, hair and eye color, and facial shape, so that television Ifurita resembles a Japanese high school girl more than a woman from an exotic land. In The Wanderers, she does not become a love interest of Makoto's at all, but stays with Jinnai, cheerfully following his orders – and trying not to screw them up; where OVA Ifurita is lethally capable and efficient, the television version is not only scatter-brained but clumsy and incompetent. Unlike in the OVA, in which she stops the Eye of God after it goes out of control, this version of Ifurita is actually the key that controls the Eye and its destructive power.

The Power Key Staff

Ifurita's Power Key Staff holds two purposes. First, it is the device used to give Ifurita power, acting as a sort of wind-up key. Second, it serves as Ifurita's primary weapon, which she uses to channel her destructive energy. The Power Key Staff is not a separate device, but rather an extension of Ifurita's own body.

=== Kalia ===
Voiced by: Yuka Imai (Japanese); Joyce Kurtz (English)

Kalia is a Demon-God discovered by Jinnai in the second OVA. While she seems to share some of the same abilities as Ifurita, her real power is absorbing energy and using it to her advantage. It is unknown if she has the capability of copying the techniques of her opponents; however, she is fully able to collect and conserve energy from one or multiple attackers and reflect that power back at her leisure. Aside from this, she can also absorb and drain energy from living and biomechanical things through the gauntlets on her hands.

Her true purpose is to be the control of an ancient El-Hazard weapon called the Trigger of Destruction, made in the Holy Wars as a final act of vengeance by tribes affected by the Eye of God. The Trigger itself is essentially a Doomsday Device, killing both enemy and friend as it weaves its way through dimensions, annihilating anything caught in its path. Kalia takes control of the machine after defeating and sealing Ifurita-2, but Makoto and the revived Ifurita are able to elude the Trigger's defenses and enter Kalia's control room.

Caught distracted while attacking Makoto, Ifurita-2 drives her staff through Kalia's activation module and fires, reducing her to scrap as she melts from the inside out. Upon her death, the Trigger loses semblance and is destroyed along with her.

Kalia does not appear in The Wanderers.

=== Alielle Relryle ===
Voiced by: Etsuko Kozakura (Japanese); Melissa Fahn (English)

Alielle Relryle (アレーレ・レレライル Arēre Rererairu) is Princess Fatora's concubine, who is introduced when she returns to the royal palace after visiting her parents and sneaks into Fatora's bedroom while Makoto (still dressed as Fatora) is in bed. When she learns the whole truth, she becomes worried for the real Fatora's safety and assists Makoto and Fujisawa as they travel to see the three priestesses of Mt. Muldoon, serving as their guide. While an intelligent and courageous companion during the first quest, once Fatora returns she becomes a sycophant who even aids her mistress in her schemes to hit on other girls.

In the opening sequence of the first OVA, there is a brief shot of Alielle wielding a curved sword, but she never actually actively participates in any combat over the course of the series.

== Muldoon Priestesses ==
The three priestesses of Mt. Muldoon are sought out by "Fatora" (Makoto in disguise), Fujisawa and Alielle on a mission from the alliance of nations against the Bugrom, as they are the only ones capable of unsealing the Eye of God's power. Each of the Muldoon priestesses holds control over a particular element and are able to wield their powers at will.

=== Shayla Shayla ===
Voiced by: Tomo Sakurai (Japanese), Mimi Woods (English)

At age nineteen, Shayla Shayla (シェーラ・シェーラ Shēra Shēra; spelled "Shaellah Shaellah" in the Etranger Tour Guide) is (initially) the youngest of the three priestesses. Holding true to the classic anime redhead stereotype, this tanned priestess' temper is as fiery as her hair, matching her control over the element of fire. Makoto, Fujisawa and Alielle first meet her when she rescues them from a Bugrom attack on Mt. Muldoon, but she runs off with Afura without hearing them out about their mission. When she first learns Makoto's true identity, she accuses him of being a pervert and tries to roast him. But after he saves her life when Ifurita awakens, she begins to develop feelings for Makoto, even though she finds it very difficult to express them openly. She also has a friendly rivalry with the wind priestess Afura Mann.

Shayla Shayla in The Wanderers

Rather than be centralized in one location, the three priestesses each run a separate temple. Fittingly enough, Shayla's fire temple is located in a volcano. She is just as temper-driven as her OVA persona, but with the addition of being a heavy gambler. When Makoto and Fujisawa first meet her, she had lost her clothes and the entire temple to Jinnai in a rigged game.

Note: Overall design and visual appearance of the character Midori Himeno from the PlayStation fighting video-game title Eretzvaju (also known as "Evil Zone" in the United States and Europe) was heavily based on Shayla-Shayla. Even though Midori's archetype is somewhat opposite to that of Shayla's, she looks exactly like her. And it was stated by the creators of Eretzvaju, that they used several El-Hazard's character designs besides Shayla's as a base to make some of the Eretzvaju characters.

=== Afura Mann ===
Voiced by: Miho Yoshida (Japanese); Melodee Lee, Patricia Ja Lee (Alternative World) (English)

Afura Mann (アフラ・マーン Afura Mān; spelled "Afrah Mahn" in the Etranger Tour Guide) is the wind priestess of Mt. Muldoon. Of the three priestesses, her personality is delved into the least, and she comes off being rather wooden and serious most of the time, although she does make the occasional crack at Shayla's expense. Even though she is about the same age as Shayla, she's much more calm and composed. Still, she's not above shirking her duties on occasion, as she and Shayla are both late for the start of the rituals at Arliman after shopping at a bazaar, and like Shayla, she fails to listen to Makoto's pleas when they first meet.

Afura in The Wanderers

Afura remains a studious, intelligent priestess in the television series. However, her background with Shayla-Shayla is plumbed into much more detail, and her personality is given slightly more definition. Not much else changes, though. Her temple is located on a windy mountain peak and contains an extensive library of texts.

=== Miz Mishtal ===
Voiced by: Saeko Shimazu (Japanese); Dorothy Elias-Fahn (English)

Miz Mishtal (ミーズ・ミシュタル Mīzu Mishutaru; spelled "Meeze Myshtar" in the Etranger Tour Guide) is the water priestess of Mt. Muldoon, as well as the oldest. Creeping towards thirty years of age, Miz's main concern, aside from her duties as a priestess, is keeping herself looking beautiful and hoping that she'll one day find a suitor so that she can marry and retire. While bathing in the springs of Arliman, a bumbling servant pours freezing cold water on her, causing her to scream, and Fujisawa, thinking she's in danger, "saves" her from her attacker. Taken with how handsome her "hero" is (not to mention that he is a teacher with a steady income), Miz instantly falls head over heels for him. Even as the world is in danger, Miz's primary motivation for ending the Bugrom conflict is so that she can plan out the whole wedding ceremony before Fujisawa can even say yes or no. Although she's more than capable of taking care of herself, she likes playing the delicate flower role when wooing Fujisawa.

Eventually, she and Fujisawa tie the knot by the end of El Hazard 2, and the water priestess becomes Miz Fujisawa. At the end of the Alternative World, she later gives birth to their son.

Miz in The Wanderers

Miz is very much the same person she is in the OVA. The water temple she controls was briefly left in the hands of Nanami, who turned it into a water park, much to Miz's dismay.

== Faces at the Palace ==
These characters are seen within or associated most often with the royal palace in Florestica, the capital of Roshtaria and the location of the headquarters of the Alliance of human nations.

=== Rune Venus ===
Voiced by: Kikuko Inoue (Japanese); Edie Mirman (OVA 1), Bridget Hoffman (English)

Rune Venus (ルーン・ヴェーナス Rūn Vēnasu; spelled "Rhun Veenas" in the Etranger Tour Guide) is a princess of Roshtaria and Fatora's older sister; she is both the leader of Roshtaria and the head of the Alliance. A serious, intelligent and kind-hearted ruler, she sends Makoto and Fujisawa on a mission to locate the Muldoon priestesses so that they can unseal the Eye of God. Even though Fatora's absence renders the superweapon useless, she and the other Alliance members believe that such an action would deter the Bugrom from attacking. She's also engaged to Prince Galus, who supports the action.

Rune Venus in The Wanderers

Like Ifurita, Rune undergoes a dramatic shift in personality and character design in The Wanderers. Younger and cuter, she's closer to Makoto's age and is made into his primary love interest as well as a much more central character in general. She's also more lighthearted and playful, but still serious enough to be a proper ruler. One particular quirk is her habit of talking to a dragon hand-puppet while bathing.

Enoki Films had planned to give Rune the dub name "Ruhn" in their license.

=== Londs ===
Voiced by: Hiroshi Naka (Japanese); Peter Spellos (English)

Londs is the chief servant of the royal house and a trained soldier. He oversees many of the day-to-day goings-on at the palace, and assists Makoto in keeping up the ruse of him playing Fatora. It is he who invites Makoto and Fujisawa to the palace after the two Earthlings rescue Princess Rune from a Bugrom attack.

Londs in The Wanderers

Londs does not change much, but he is initially much more suspicious of Makoto and Fujisawa when they first appear than he is in the OVA.

=== Dr. Schtalubaugh ===
Voiced by: Tamio Ōki (Japanese); William Frederick Knight (English)

The elderly Dean of Roshtaria's Royal Academy, Schtalubaugh has access to more knowledge about the workings of ancient El-Hazard than anyone else. It is he that discerns the exact nature of Makoto's super-ability. However, he has no knowledge of any ability to cross over dimensions, and thus is unable to find a way to return Makoto and Fujisawa to Earth. He also has hands in ceremonial matters, as Miz informs Fujisawa that he has agreed to oversee their vows at their wedding.

Dr. Schtalubaugh in The Wanderers

Very little about the good doctor changes, but there are scenes in which he is able to relax and enjoy himself.

=== Fatora Venus ===
Voiced by: Tomoko Ishimura (Japanese); Mona Marshall (OVA 1), Bridget Hoffman (OVA 2) (English)

Fatora Venus (ファトラ・ヴェーナス Fatora Vēnasu; spelled "Fatra Veenas" in the Etranger Tour Guide) is Rune's younger sister, and for most of the first OVA, she is in the clutches of the Phantom Tribe, being subjected to various scientific experiments. Although two females of royal blood are required in order to operate the Eye of God, the tribe utilizes a special device allowing them to control it with only her as a key. However, when the machine breaks down, the tribe is forced to retreat, and Ifurita, sent by Katsuhiko, takes her to the Bugrom to become their prisoner. When she's finally freed, she agrees to help Rune activate the Eye of God to eliminate the Bugrom, but Phantom Tribe sabotage causes the Eye to run out of control after they activate it together.

Although the members of the palace look at her with love and admiration, Fatora is in actuality a selfish despot. (Alielle, her lesbian lover, is happy to see that she hasn't changed at all after her ordeal.) She shows very little gratitude towards Makoto for rescuing her, instead declaring how he must have a greater appreciation for her station now that he's had a chance to live it. Therefore, she is doted ONLY by the royal members and is greatly disrespected by other parties, including the priestesses and Makoto's party. She is particularly disliked by Nanami and Shayla-Shayla, whom she would often try to seduce.

An apparently open lesbian (there is no indication in the narrative that her tastes are at all hidden knowledge), she is much like her primary lover Alielle in that she has an overdeveloped sex drive and little concern for the concept of "faithfulness" or even "disinterested". While it's implied that she has had many other "once-off" lovers in the past, and is attracted to Kalia when she first appears, during her appearance in the series she is fixated primarily on Shayla-Shayla and Nanami Jinnai: even though she knows that the two of them are both interested in Makoto, she still tries to lure them into sharing her bed. Fatora even goes to the extent of using her similarity to Makoto to disguise herself as him to try to take advantage of their crushes on him; while Nanami recognizes the truth and admonishes her, she manages to fool Shayla-Shayla sufficiently that she manages to kiss her, naturally prompting a fiery explosion of fury when the priestess realized who just claimed her first kiss.

Fatora does not exist in The Wanderers.

=== Ura ===
Voiced by: Aya Sakaguchi (Japanese); Julie Maddalena (English)

Ura (ウーラ Uura; spelled "Oolah" in the Etranger Tour Guide) is a cat and Fatora's personal pet. Unlike felines of Earth, however, the cats of El-Hazard are able to stretch and wrap around humans, becoming a highly durable living armor. Ura is loaned to Makoto while he impersonates Fatora, and the cat saves his life on several occasions. As armor, Ura is at least strong enough to withstand a single blast of energy from Ifurita. He is also capable of limited human speech. A similar cat is seen around Rune Venus briefly, but is not named or otherwise shown again.

After Fatora is rescued, the princess ungratefully admonishes Ura and threatens to punish him. When Makoto steps in to defend Ura, Fatora cuts ties with her pet, and the cat becomes Makoto's guardian full-time.

Ura in The Wanderers

In The Wanderers, Ura is a cat raised in the wilds of a forest. He befriends Makoto and ends up tagging along with him, using his abilities as armor to protect him when needed.

== The Phantom Tribe ==
The Phantom Tribe is a society of blue-skinned humanoids that were pulled into El-Hazard when the Eye of God was last activated in ancient times. Shunned by the ancients, they live as outcasts and hold a deep-seated grudge against all of El-Hazard. The members of the Phantom Tribe have innate powers of illusion, allowing them to disguise themselves as humans and create environmental illusions such as flash floods that are realistic enough to convince a person that he is actually drowning. They appear to dissolve at the moment of death.

The Phantom Tribe does not exist in The Wanderers universe.

=== Galus ===
Voiced by: Ryūzaburō Ōtomo (Japanese); Tom Wyner (English)

Although the hierarchy of the Phantom Tribe isn't fully explored, Galus is probably their leader. Disguised as a human prince, he became engaged to Rune Venus at some point before the beginning of the OVA series. He manipulates the Alliance council into unsealing the Eye of God and kidnaps Princess Fatora in order to use the Eye to destroy all of El-Hazard in an act of insane revenge. Cunning and tactical, his hatred for the people of El-Hazard is boundless.

=== Kiriya ===
Voiced by: Mizuki Ōtsuka (Japanese); Debra Jean Rogers (English)

A Phantom Tribe assassin, Galus sends Kiriya to kill Makoto (still disguised as Fatora) before he can contact the Muldoon priestesses as with his death, everyone will be convinced that the real Fatora is dead. Her initial attempt at his life is thwarted by the appearance of Shayla-Shayla, who creates too much havoc to allow her to properly aim a shot from her crossbow. Later, at the Holy Fountain of Arliman, she disguises herself as a beautiful blonde woman and attempts to get close enough to Makoto to eliminate him. However, Nanami sees through Kiriya's illusion, and Miz kills her.

=== Nahato ===
Voiced by: Rikako Aikawa (Japanese); Mona Marshall (English)

A young Phantom Tribe boy, Nahato is a loyal retainer of Galus, willing to put his life on the line if it means his lord's plans will come to fruition. Despite his young age, he's highly intelligent, and he typically shows up at just the right time to make things more difficult for Makoto and the others. He closely assists Galus in the project to use Fatora as their key to the Eye of God. Nahato sabotages the Eye, under Galus' orders, causing it to go out of control and threaten El-Hazard when Princesses Rune Venus and Fatora use it to destroy the Bugrom. He is last seen holding a dying Galus before vanishing with his illusion power. His whereabouts after the first OVA series, and those of any other surviving Phantom Tribe members, is unknown.

== The Bugrom ==
Four varieties of Bugrom in The Magnificent World belonging to Jinnai's squad.

The Bugrom tribe is a race of largely human-sized or above human-sized insectoid creatures. Though their origin is unclear, it is likely they represent part of the indigenous fauna of El Hazard, being a dominant species prior to human colonization in the far past. They exist in several different varieties and are much stronger than an average human. Only Fujisawa is capable of defeating them in hand-to-hand combat with his super strength. Although typically rather unintelligent and disorganized, Jinnai rallies them into an effective army, and with the help of Ifurita, they come extremely close to conquering El-Hazard before they are almost completely wiped out when Princesses Rune Venus and Fatora activate the Eye of God. In the rest of the OVA continuity (EL Hazard: The Magnificent World 2 and El Hazard: The Alternative World), they are thus focused on creating a new hive in order to repopulate and eventually launch a retaliatory attack. In The Wanderers, Jinnai and the Bugrom forces are the primary antagonists rather than the Phantom Tribe.

The 'primary' Bugrom come in six different types, most of which are taller than humans. Additionally, there also exists Queen Diva (who looks almost entirely humanoid, which may be due to her position as a "Royal Caste" Bugrom), a very small fly-like Bugrom that apparently serves as a courier, and two creatures that might be Bugrom or merely trained insects. The first of these is a giant, scarab-like beetle that it is used as a flying transport, while the second is a scorpion-like creature that Jinnai presses into use as a living catapult, though whether this was its original function is unknown.

Jinnai assembles a group consisting of one Bugrom of each of the six main types as his main squad. In the English-language version, he names them Groucho, Harpo, Zeppo, Gummo, Chico, and Margaret, as a homage to the Marx Brothers and their foil Margaret Dumont. These are the only Bugrom besides Diva to survive the Eye of God being fired, and are thus responsible for helping Jinnai and Diva to create a new Bugrom Hive.

- The first type is possibly the 'default' Bugrom, and resembles a four-legged centauroid beetle with a domed, helmet-like head. This Bugrom is predominantly purple in color, except for its chest, which is red. This is the type of Bugrom that Jinnai names "Katsuho" ("Groucho" in the dub), and is his primary follower amongst the squad.
- The second type is slightly leaner and taller than the first and is orange and black in color, somewhat reminiscent of a bombardier beetle. This Bugrom has a somewhat narrow and elongated head, fitting its general body structure. Jinnai's name for this type of Bugrom is "Masuo" ("Harpo").
- The third type of Bugrom is the shortest type, barely being Jinnai's height, and has a "hunchbacked" body structure with red and blue coloring. This is the Bugrom Jinnai names "Namihei" ("Zeppo").
- The fourth type of Bugrom looks extremely human, even having a face that resembles a human mask, though this lies beneath a toadstool-like "cap" of shell. Colored yellow and greenish-blue, Jinnai calls this Bugrom "Ikura" ("Gummo").
- The fifth type of Bugrom is the tallest and looks much like the first, though its squat head is mantis-like and it has a "crest" of shell on its shoulders that looks like a formal collar. This orange and blue Bugrom is called "Tarao" ("Chico") by Jinnai.
- The sixth and final type is almost as human-looking as the fourth, though its abdomen is smaller (looking more like coat tails) and it has a mantis-like head and a cobra-like "hood" of shell. Jinnai names this green and red Bugrom "Norisuke" ("Margaret").

Enoki Films had planned to give Bugrom the dub name "Insectrons" in its license.

=== Queen Diva ===
Voiced by: Yoko Sawami (Japanese); Elisa Gabriella (OVA 1), Mary Elizabeth McGlynn (English)

Queen Diva (ディーバ Dība; spelled "Dheeva" in the Etranger Tour Guide) is the ruler of the Bugrom. With the exception of a few features, she has the external appearance of a beautiful woman and is the only fully humanoid member of the tribe, though this may possibly be an illusion, as with the case of the ruler of the Insects in the Alternate World of Creteria. When Katsuhiko arrives in El-Hazard and is brought before her by some of her soldiers, she becomes convinced that he is actually a messenger sent by God destined to lead the Bugrom to victory over their enemies in the Alliance. Impressed by Katsuhiko's ability to mobilize the troops and conquer nations with ease, she also becomes romantically interested in him. When the Bugrom homeland is annihilated by the Eye of God, she manages to avoid the attack with Jinnai's personal squad by traveling to deliver supplies to Katsuhiko on the frontline.

At the start of the Alternate World series, she is urged by Jinnai to produce eggs for the new colony they are constructing, due to the Bugrom having been decimated by the Eye of God — Even though more survivors have found their way to the new colony, their numbers are still insufficient. However, much to Jinnai's horror, she needs to have a mate in order to give birth to a new generation, and Jinnai is the only male available at the time (at least, that is what she claims). Jinnai's attempt to escape her is why he and his squad are transported to Cretaria. Once they return, however, Jinnai is dragged into Diva's amorous embrace.

Diva in The Wanderers

Diva is very much a background character in the OVA, and she doesn't have much more to do in The Wanderers, either. However, the relationship between her, Jinnai, and the bubble-headed Ifurita does take on a rather comedic family dynamic. Also, The Wanderers is the only El-Hazard series in which Diva encounters a human character without a special power to understand the Bugrom language.

Enoki Films had planned to give Diva the dub name "Deeva" in its license.

== Characters from The Alternative World ==
These characters are exclusive to the OVA series' TV spinoff The Alternative World, and do not appear in The Wanderers.

=== Qawool Towles ===
Voiced by: Maaya Sakamoto (Japanese); Emily Brown (English)

Qawool Towles (クァウール・タウラス Kwaūru Taurasu) is a young 17-year-old priestess and the youngest priestess of Mount Muldoon ever. She was the top student of her class and took the place of Miz Mishtal after the former priestess of water married Fujisawa. Qawool's servant is Alielle's twin brother, Parnasse. Qawool is also very afraid of insects, which causes her to destroy whatever is around her. Like Alielle, Qawool addresses Makoto Mizuhara as master, because he saved her life and she is also in love with him. At first unsure of her role as a Priestess, her adventure in Creteria helps her gain confidence, and she gradually grows into her responsibility.

As a minor note, when The Alternative World was released in North America through Pioneer Animation (or Geneon, as it is now called), her name was written as "Qawool" and "Qawoor" on the packaging (the spelling used depended on the volume.) Ostensibly, this was done to make her name sound more native to El-Hazard, since "Qawool" can be hard for English speakers to distinguish from "Kaoru," a very common name in Japan. It may also be an attempt to represent the "ku-sub-a" phoneme that begins her name.

=== Parnasse Ralielle ===
Voiced by: Hiromi Ishikawa (Japanese); Mona Marshall (English)

Parnasse is Alielle's younger brother, who possesses looks and temperaments akin with his sister. Arriving at the Roshtaria palace as Qawool Towles' attendant, he develops a swift crush on Princess Fatora after she accidentally molests him in his sleep because she had mistaken him for Alielle.

=== Arjah ===
Voiced by: Takeshi Aono (Japanese); Doug Stone (English)

Arjah, the prime antagonist of The Alternative World, is a mysterious multi-dimensional being and self-proclaimed "ruler of the universe" who is trapped within the Spring of Life (Creteria's equivalent of El Hazard's Eye of God, and also a dimensional portal). His background story is unknown, but apparently he was incarcerated during the last time the Spring was deployed. However, Arjah was still able to reach out beyond his prison and into other worlds, and at an opportune moment activates a dimensional transport device which draws the series' protagonists from El Hazard into Creteria. He tricks Makoto and Gilda into activating the Spring, thereby giving him the chance to escape; but the Muldoon Priestesses manage to renew the seal, causing him to be obliterated.

=== Dall Narciss ===
Voiced by: Takehito Koyasu (Japanese); Steve Blum (English)

Dall Narciss III is the vain, despotic emperor of the realm of Creteria in another world. In his younger years, when he was engaged to Gilda, he accidentally opened the Spring of Life and witnessed a vision of the time the Spring destroyed Creteria's previous civilisation. Because his bride Gilda had - like him - the genetic prerequisite to undo the Spring's safety seals, he cancelled their engagement to prevent it from ever being used again. After Arjah tricks Gilda and Makoto into releasing the seals, he is critically wounded by Gilda after Arjah possesses her body. However, as the main protagonists return to El Hazard after resealing the Spring, a vision is shown which depicts Narciss having made a full recovery and living a peaceful, simpler life with Gilda and their daughter.

=== Gilda ===
Voiced by: Taenoko Tamagawa (Japanese); Carol Stanzione (English)

Gilda is Dall Narciss' aide de camp, and a princess from another country who was originally set to marry Narciss since her childhood. However, after Narciss became tempted to open the Spring of Life and afterwards rejected her for unexplained reasons, she became harsh and bitter over the loss of her love. After she sees him apparently losing his heart to Qawool Towles and Creteria falling into ruin, she initiates a coup d'etat to seize the secrets of the Spring of Life and save the country. However, with this action she plays right into Arjah's hands, who possesses and uses her to activate the Spring once more. After Arjah leaves her, she aids Makoto in rectifying her mistake. In a final vision seen by the main protagonists as they return to El Hazard, she is seen happily married to Narciss and having a daughter.

=== Chabil ===
Voiced by: Kunihiko Yasui (Japanese); Jamieson Price (English)

Chabil is a farmer who is first introduced in episode 4. After discovering Afura Mann and the newly-weds Fujisawa and Miz Mishtal on his land, he welcomes them into his home. They are surprised to find Princess Rune Venus is already there, wearing clothing fitting for a farmer's wife. The group is surprised to find her acting in wifely ways, particularly cooking; Miz gets a bit jealous that Chabil treats Rune in a more romantic manner than Fujisawa treats her.

Chabil and Rune develop romantic feelings for each other, seemingly quickly. Within episode 4, the two admit their fondness for one another while enjoying a sunset by the edge of a lake, but Rune points out that she has responsibilities she must attend and therefore cannot stay with him.

=== Termite Queen ===
Voiced by: Yoko Sawami (Japanese); - (English)

The Termite Queen is the ruler of a tribe of giant, intelligent subterranean termites who pass as the Creterian equivalent of El Hazard's Bugroms. She is an insectoid, but has the ability to assume the shape of an attractive female who shares a great likeness with Diva. Unlike the latter, however, she welcomes guests in her realm either as a food source (if male) or to nourish her young (if female); her would-be victims Jinnai and Shayla-Shayla, however, timely manage to escape her clutches.
