= Deborah Gates =

American actress and director

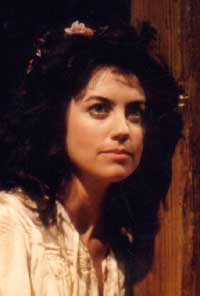
- Deborah Gates as Ophelia in Hamlet
- Born: United States
- Occupations: Actress, director, voice actress

Deborah Gates is an American actress and director who founded Shakespeare at Play in Los Angeles, California, an acting company that specializes in abridged versions of William Shakespeare's works for young audiences.

== Career ==
Gate's career began as a voice actress for The Walt Disney Company, providing the voice of Thumper in Walt Disney's Story of Bambi in 1977. She attended the University of California, Irvine to study drama, acting in Hedda Gabler and Antigone. Following her graduation in 1978, she attended the State University of New York on a fellowship for graduate studies in drama. Gates also taught stage classes for the emotionally and physically disabled. She played many classical roles, including Ophelia in Mark Ringer's staging of Hamlet, Kate in Taming of the Shrew, Hermia in A Midsummer Night's Dream and Juliet in Romeo and Juliet at the Globe Playhouse, as well as non-classical roles like Mrs. San Francisco in Mrs. California and Quilters, winning a Drama-Logue Award for the latter.

From 1985 to 1987, Gates voiced Minnie Mouse for commercials, toys, and records, including the album Totally Minnie. She also voiced Dr. Elsa Schneider in the Read-Along Adventures adaptation of Indiana Jones and the Last Crusade, and provided additional voices in Oliver & Company, the read-along storybooks Aladdin: Iago Returns and The Lion King: The Brightest Star, and the album Dinosaurs: Classic Tales. She appeared in many television series and programs such as the soap operas Ryan's Hope and Guiding Light, the sitcom Mr. Belvedere, V as Thelma, Adam-12 as an attacking woman, and Sisters as a reporter, and a small number of films including Brewster's Millions, Happy Hour as Meredith Casey, Return of the Killer Tomatoes as a woman in a parking lot, and Yi ge mao xian de mei guo nu ren in the lead role of American journalist Helen Foster Snow.

== Personal life ==
Gates is married to Walt Disney Records vice president Ted Kryczko.
