= Battle Athletes =

Japanese media franchise

- Region 1 DVD Cover of Vol. 1 released by Pioneer

バトルアスリーテス大運動会 (Batoru Asurītesu Daiundōkai)
- Genre: Comedy, science fiction
- Manga
- Written by: Yūki Nakano
- Published by: ASCII Media Works
- Imprint: Dengeki Comics
- Original run: March 1997 – November 1998
- Volumes: 4
- Original video animation
- Directed by: Kazuhiro Ozawa
- Written by: Hideyuki Kurata
- Music by: Takayuki Hattori
- Studio: AIC (Note: Production assistance (制作協力) for all episodes provided by Daume.)
- Licensed by: NA: Discotek Media
- Released: May 25, 1997 – June 25, 1998
- Episodes: 6
- Anime television series

Battle Athletes Victory
- Directed by: Katsuhito Akiyama
- Produced by: Kazuaki Morijiri; Makiko Iwata
- Written by: Hideyuki Kurata; Yōsuke Kuroda
- Music by: Yoshikazu Suo
- Studio: AIC (Note: Production assistance (制作協力) for all episodes provided by Oniro, Shaft, and Magic Bus.)
- Licensed by: NA: Discotek Media
- Original network: TXN (TV Tokyo)
- Original run: October 3, 1997 – March 27, 1998
- Episodes: 26
- Video game
- Publisher: NewGin
- Genre: Pachinko
- Platform: Arcade
- Released: March 2009
- Manga

Battle Athletes Victory ReSTART!
- Written by: Rui Takatō
- Published by: Jitsugyo no Nihon Sha
- Imprint: Comic Ruelle & Comic Jardin
- Original run: July 2020 – March 2021
- Anime television series

Battle Athletes Victory ReSTART!
- Directed by: Tokihiro Sasaki
- Written by: Yōhei Kashii
- Music by: hisakuni; Yasuhiro Gasa; Shingo Yamazaki; Takuma Sogi; Yūko Takahashi; Kazuki Tomita; Kenta Yokochi
- Studio: AIC Rights; Seven
- Licensed by: Crunchyroll
- Original network: ANN (TV Asahi)
- Original run: April 11, 2021 – June 27, 2021
- Episodes: 12

Battle Athletes (バトルアスリーテス大運動会, Batoru Asurītesu Daiundōkai) is a Japanese franchise which includes an OVA series animated by AIC, a manga by Yūki Nakano, and a 26-episode anime television series that aired on TV Tokyo from October 1997 to March 1998.

A reboot manga, Pale Blue Dot: Battle Athletes Daiundōkai ReSTART!, was serialized from July 2020 to March 2021, and a new anime series was announced. The new anime television series by Seven and AIC Rights was aired from April to June 2021 on TV Asahi's NUMAnimation block.

== Plot ==
=== Battle Athletes ===
Battle Athletes is a six-episode OVA set in the distant future where, after many years of war with an extraterrestrial race, a contest of physical strength between one representative from each race is agreed. Although the alien race is far superior to the humans, the human champion prevailed, marking an era of peace for humanity. A University Satellite is created where the greatest athletes of the age train with women competing for the title of Cosmo Beauty.

Akari Kanzaki, daughter of a former Cosmo Beauty, arrives at the University Satellite excited and ready to compete. After watching defending Cosmo Beauty Lahrri run faster than she ever has despite the artificial gravity being turned up, Akari realizes just how far she needs to go. Helping her are her fellow team members and roommates Kris Christopher, a soon-to-be priestess from the moon, and Anna Respighi, a shy girl with a secret so hidden even she is unaware of it. Kris is marked as a standout athlete and competes on a level near Lahrri drawing the wrath of another top competitor Mylandah onto the team as they prepare for the final competition.

=== Battle Athletes Victory ===
The television series is not a sequel to the OVA, but a complete retelling of the story. The basic premise of the series remain intact, as Akari still strives for the title of Cosmo Beauty, but the plot line and characterizations are often radically different. The characters and stories of this series tend to be more outrageous in tone than the first series.

The story begins with Akari Kanzaki at a school on Antarctica in the year 4999. There are a series of tests that she and her classmates must go through to determine who'll be the representatives to go to University Satellite, a satellite training facility. Living under the shadow of her mother, the legendary Cosmo Beauty Tomoe Midou, Akari, emotionally fragile in this version, struggles as the worst athlete at the training school. Eventually, with the help of her best friend Ichan, Akari succeeds in making it to the University Satellite where she competes for the title of Cosmo Beauty and trains for a mission that will decide the fate of the human race.

=== Battle Athletes Victory ReSTART! ===
In the year 5100, athletes from around the Solar System compete to become Cosmo Beauty, the champion of an athletic tournament.

== Characters ==
Akari Kanzaki (神崎 あかり, Kanzaki Akari)
Voiced by: Rio Natsuki (Japanese); Dyanne DiRosario (OVA), Lia Sargent (Victory) (English)
Born in Hokkaido, Japan on March 23, 4983.16 years old. She is the daughter of Tomoe Midou, a former Cosmo Beauty. She's determined to follow in the footsteps of her mother in order to be Cosmo Beauty. However; she is usually ditzy, clumsy, and sometimes a crybaby. In the TV series, whenever she is embarrassed she hides in a cardboard box labeled "Akari House" (あかりハウス, Akari Hausu).
She starts the series as one of the worst students. But it is revealed later, however, that she is not truly inept, but had very little confidence in herself and was unable to cope with the death of her mother. After she was demoralized by top student Jessie and retreated to her home, Ichino visited her and she returns to school with new determination, and then demonstrated a rapid improvement in skill, even defeating Jessie in the final exam race.
Towards the end of the series, after meeting several greater challenges and struggles, she becomes stronger and confident in herself, and successfully reaches the final race for Cosmo Beauty alongside her friend and teammate Kris.
In the OVAs, as she becomes stronger and more confident, she cuts her hair short. Her hobby is to read.
Ichino Yanigida (柳田 一乃, Yanigida Ichino)
Voiced by: Aya Hisakawa (Japanese); Wendee Lee (English)
She was born on December 31, 4982, in Osaka, Japan. She is the best friend of Akari and, like her, also wants to become Cosmo Beauty. She cares for Akari very much, and always tried to help her when Akari was struggling. But when Akari rapidly improved herself, Ichino feels threatened and, in their last race against each other, Ichino fractured her right ankle; losing her chance to compete for the prestigious University Satellite, much to both their depression. In the end, Akari went on to enter the University with blessings from Ichino. After her full recovery, she later helps Akari in defeating the Nerillians. Initially her feelings for Akari are ambiguous until near the end of the series where she confesses her feelings towards her. She likes playing Shogi (Japanese chess) and is a big fan of the Osaka Tigers. Her personality is more upbeat, positive than Akari. She does not appear in the OVAs.
Tarnya Natdhipytadd (ターニャ・ナティピタッド, Tānya Natipitaddo; Tanya in English dub)
Voiced by: Aya Sakuguchi (Japanese); Brianne Siddall (OVA), Julie Maddalena (Victory) (English)
She was born on May 5th, 4984 in Johannesburg, South Africa. She is fourteen years old, enjoys hunting and fortune-telling, and has a voracious appetite; her personality is described as willful. She is very childlike, hyperactive, and even somewhat wild, and would occasionally run on all fours like an animal. She passes the Antarctica final exam in third place, and gets accepted into the University Satellite alongside Akari and Jessie. However, she's unable to enter the competition for Cosmo Beauty due to her team being defeated by Akari's, but even still Tanya still remains good friends with her.
Jessie Gurtland (ジェシー・ガートランド, Jeshī Gātorando)
Voiced by: Miki Itō (Japanese); Lia Sargent (OVA), Christina Carlisi (Victory) (English)
She was born on July 10th, 4981 in New York City, United States. Living in poverty and having lost both of her parents when she was young, Jessie was forced to work hard to care for her younger siblings, especially her ill younger sister. She was then taken in by a priest and, with the encouragement of Tomoe Midou, she resolves to become Cosmo Beauty. She is very hardworking and was the top student of the school in Antarctica, holding a great deal of admiration for Tomoe Midou, even wanting to become her. However, she is also a perfectionist and overachiever. Because of this, she strongly detested Akari, whom she views as weak and unworthy to be called Tomoe's daughter. The only classmate she felt any sort of respect for was her rival, Ayla. She is highly critical of weakness, including her own. She is never seen praising or encouraging others not as good as her, and becomes embittered and even heartbroken when she is surpassed which ultimately leads to her resigning from the prestigious University Satellite after being unable to compete with top student, Larrie Fel Donato. In the original manga story, however, she is a friendly rival of Akari and does not resent her; rather she views Akari as one of her best friends. Jessie also enjoys dancing, motorsports and playing piano.
Ayla Veverská Roznovsky (アイラ・ヴェフェラスカ・ロスノフスキ, Aira Veferasuka Rosunofusuki)
Voiced by: Yoko Soumi (Japanese); Mary Elizabeth McGlynn (English)
She was born on May 8th, 4981 in Moscow, Russia. She has a cold and distant personality, but she is actually quite nice and becomes friends with Akari, Ichino, and Tarnya. She was one of the Antarctica school's top students, a rival of Jessie, and the only one Jessie showed any respect for. She joined the school of Antarctica in order to bring honor to her country. However, after finding out that her country was conquered, she decided to quit. She later marries her swimming instructor, Sergei, and they have a child together, whom she named Jessie, in honor of her former rival. Swimming is her favorite sport. She does not appear in the OVAs.
Ling-Pha Wong (王 鈴花, Wong Ling Pha)
Voiced by: Taeko Kawata (Japanese); Bridget Hoffman (English)
She was born on August 12th, 4982 in Hong Kong. She uses various cheating methods in order to win but still always ends up losing in the end. However, she sneaks into the Satellite University, wearing a pink wing and going by the name "Marshall". She serves as the comic relief of the show. She enjoys bicycling. She doesn't appear in the OVAs.
Kris Christopher (クリス・クリストファ, Kurisu Kurisutofa)
Voiced by: Tomoko Kawakami (Japanese); Dorothy Elias-Fahn (English)
An agrarian priestess from the Moon and member of Akari's team in the University Satellite, born January 1, 4982. She is roommates with Akari and Anna at the University Satellite. She has strange habits, such as walking around the dorm naked, and she also has a pet cow called "Gyubei", whose milk she cannot live without. She falls in love with Akari at first sight, much to Akari's shock. But as Akari bonds with her teammates, they become close friends, and competed with each other in the final race for Cosmo Beauty. She becomes love rivals with Ichino.
Anna Respighi (アンナ・レスピーギ, Anna Resupīgi)
Voiced by: Akiko Yajima (Japanese); Bridget Hoffman (English)
A girl from Satellite Colony 7, born August 7th, 4982. In the OVA, Anna is enrolled in the University Satellite by his mother. Eventually, it is revealed that Anna is a boy and was raised to be a girl. Because of this, Anna transfers out of the Girls' satellite and moves into the Boy's satellite. In the TV series, she is a girl, de facto. She becomes Akari's and Kris' teammate and friend in the University Satellite. She is a cute girl who enjoys cooking. However, her psyche possesses an inner rage that occasionally makes her become hostile. In the past, she and her twin sister Elaine fought for the attention of their mother, which led to Anna injuring Elaine in an act of jealousy during a game. By the end, the two later make up and become sisters again.
Miranda Acker Valder (ミランダ・アーカー・ヴァルター, Miranda Ākā Varudā; Mylandah Arkar Walder in English dub)
Voiced by: Akemi Okamura (Japanese); Debra Jean Rogers (English)
A senior student from Satellite Colony 3, born February 10th, 4980. She's one of the top students in the University Satellite, but also the most brutal, aggressive, and dangerous, which led her to continue her training in the school's detention prison away from the others. She was once friends with Larrie, up until the final round which resulted in her losing the Cosmo Beauty title to her. This caused her to become obsessed with defeating Larrie, which was more important to her than even the title of Cosmo Beauty. During the Cosmo Beauty competition, she cruelly injured Anna during their tennis match, knocking Anna out of the competition and earning Kris' anger. Both Miranda and Larrie were defeated in the semifinals by Akari and Kris, just one match away from racing against Larrie in the final race for Cosmo Beauty. She and Larrie continued their rivalry afterwards, on friendlier terms. In the OVAs, she gets expelled from the satellite.
Larrie Fel Donato (ラーリ・フェルドナント, Rāri Ferudonanto; Lahrri Feldnunt in English dub)
Voiced by: Yuriko Yamaguchi (Japanese); Mary Elizabeth McGlynn (OVA), Mimi Woods (Victory) (English)
A senior Mongolian student, born June 30th, 4980. She was the top student at the University Satellite and winner of the Cosmo Beauty title 2 years in a row. She is so powerful that she is the only student (alongside her rival, Miranda) without a teammate, defeating all other three-girl teams by herself. She's devoid of emotion, focuses only on being the best, and is dismissive of everything and everyone else. Despite already holding the title of Cosmo Beauty, she remains unsatisfied until she can break Tomoe Midou's universal running record. She initially had no respect for the cheerful and friendly Akari because she believed that the only way to succeed and win is to be how she is: completely machine-like. But after seeing how happy and fulfilled Akari was during their semifinal match, Larrie realized what she had lost, and was defeated by Akari, finally losing her title as Cosmo Beauty. In the past, Larrie was more friendly and sociable with a great love for sports. When they first competed with each other, she noticed how unhappy Miranda was and suggested they become rivals and compete with each other, so that Miranda can see how fun sports can be. Sometime afterwards, she focused only on winning and nothing else, and adopted her robotic drive to succeed. This caused her to break up her friendship with Miranda and the two have been bitter rivals ever since. But after the two of them were defeated in the Cosmo Beauty competition, they continued their rivalry with each other, this time, on friendlier terms.
Grant Oldman (グラン・オールドマン, Guran Ōrudoman)
Voiced by: Kouji Nakata (Japanese); Steven Blum (English)
The headmaster of University Satellite. He possesses super strength, and was once a top athlete who brought Earth to victory against the aliens. He is very friendly and encouraging to his students as well as highly supportive of Akari in her goal to become Cosmo Beauty. In the OVA, he is a pervert who sneaks in to the Women's dorm and bath.

=== Battle Athletes Victory ReSTART! Characters ===
Kanata Akehoshi (明星かなた, Akehoshi Kanata)
Voiced by: Sumire Morohoshi
Eva Garenstein (エヴァ・ガレンシュタイン, Eva Garenshutain)
Voiced by: Yui Ishikawa
Shelley Wong (シェリイ・ウォン, Sherii Uon)
Voiced by: Miyu Tomita
Yana Christopher (アナ・クリストファ, Ana Kurisutofa)
Voiced by: Saori Hayami
Lydia Gurtland (リディア・ガートランド, Ridia Gātorando)
Voiced by: Akari Kitō
Paglia Respighi (パリア・レスピーギ, Paria Resupīgi)
Voiced by: Hikaru Nanjō
Jefferson Natdhipytadd (ジェフェルソン・ナティピタッド, Jeferuson Natipitaddo)
Voiced by: Satoshi Mikami
Stella Rosnovsky (ステラ・ロスノフスキ, Sutera Rosunofusuki)
Voiced by: Yūko Mita
Tamami Yanagida (柳田球美, Yanagida Tamami)
Voiced by: Kana Ueda
Johann Reinhardt Roberts (ヨハン・ラインハルト・ロバーツ, Yohan Rainharuto Robātsu)
Voiced by: Shuta Morishima
Chal Walder (チャル・ヴァルター, Charu Vuarutā)
Voiced by: Reina Kondō

== Development ==
At first, the creation of the franchise was set for a public radio drama at start of 1996 on "Orikasa Ai's Moonlight Cafe". When the end of 1996 approached, a video game of the same name was released for the Sega Saturn system. It was followed up by the OAV series (the first video adaptation) and, some months later, by the TV version. Two more games were released eventually ("Alternative" in 1998, also for the Saturn, and "GTO" in 1999, for the PlayStation). There was also a comic adaptation, subtitled "A.D. 4999".

== Media ==
=== Manga ===
A manga adaptation also exists. The story is very different from the anime series which involves Akari being a new candidate in the Antarctica Academy. There she meets her male instructor aa he helps her improve her skills. Akari meets some of the athletes as some become her good friends and some as her sworn rivals. There is a few differences with most of the characters:

Akari: In the anime series, she is hardly an athlete who believes she shouldn't be an athlete like her mother Tomoe Midou and believes she should quit. In the manga, she wanted to improve herself to see if she is worthy of being a true athlete like her mom.

Ichino: In the anime series, Ichino and Akari have been friends since they were twelve years old and Ichino is helping Akari to keep going of being a worthy athlete. In the manga, Ichino first met Akari when Akari enrolled to the academy and become friends right away. Ichino still acts hot-headed sometimes.

Jessie: In the anime series, Jessie acts kind to everyone except to Akari because Akari is the daughter of Tomoe Midou, for Jessie's goal is to become the next Cosmo Beauty Queen and surpass Tomoe Midou. She wants to be the best to everyone including Akari. In the manga, Jessie is a lot more cheerful and is nice to all the athletes which she doesn't see Akari as a rival but a friend. She sees all sports as her favorite hobby to do and have fun.

Tarnya: In the anime series, Tarnya has darker skin and acts all funny. She looks like a cat and acts all childish. In the manga, Tarnya is close to resemble her OVA appearance has less childlike personality and likes to do fun stuff.

Ling Pha: In the anime series, Ling Pha is a princess of China and has a selfish personality that she would do anyway of becoming the new Cosmo Beauty Queen even if it means by cheating. In the manga, Ling Pha is much kind to her friends, has a ponytail, and doesn't cheat. Her father is a very rich merchant who sells special medicine which Ling Pha gives some of her medicine to her friends to help them out, in which case the medicine backfires of that cause side effects for which Ling Pha doesn't know much about the medicines she gives out. She is close friends with Tarnya.

Ayla: In the anime series, Ayla's hair style is a wrap of pigtails and has calm personality. Ayla likes to remain calm and never loses her cool. In the manga, Ayla's hairstyle is a well groom pouf fashion and has a dark personality. She watches on all the athletes to learn of their skills and to know of their weakness as she gathers information (data) on them and take them out.

=== Anime ===
==== OVA ====
No.	Title	Directed by (Note: Information is taken from the ending credits of each episode.)	Storyboarded by	Original release date
1	"Chronicle Beginning"; Transliteration: "Nendaiki no Hajimari" (Japanese: 年代記の始まり)	Kazuhiro Ozawa	Kazuhiro Ozawa	May 25, 1997
2	"Oath Entrant"; Transliteration: "Chikai no Shinnyūsei" (Japanese: 誓いの新入生)	Ken'ichi Yatagai	Ken'ichi Yatagai	July 25, 1997
3	"Screaming Advance"; Transliteration: "Odoroki no Shinpo" (Japanese: 驚きの進歩)	Kyūichi Sotoyama	Kyūichi Sotoyama	October 25, 1997
4	"Match Unexpected"; Transliteration: "Omoigakenai Kōtekishu" (Japanese: 思いがけない好敵手)	Ken'ichi Yatagai	Ken'ichi Yatagai	December 21, 1997
5	"Objective Tension"; Transliteration: "Mokuhyō e no Doryoku" (Japanese: 目標への努力)	Takafumi Hoshikawa	Kazuhiro Ozawa	March 21, 1998
6	"Stage Yonder"; Transliteration: "Butai no Mukō ni..." (Japanese: 舞台の向こうに…)	Kazuhiro Ozawa, Ken'ichi Yatagai, Kyūichi Sotoyama	Kazuhiro Ozawa, Ken'ichi Yatagai, Kyūichi Sotoyama, Takafumi Hoshikawa	June 25, 1998

==== 1997 series ====
No.	Title	Directed by	Written by	Storyboarded by	Original release date
1	"Ready Go!"; Transliteration: "Yōi don" (Japanese: よういどん)	Takashi Kobayashi	Hideyuki Kurata	Katsuhito Akiyama	October 3, 1997
2	"Kowloon's Attack!"; Transliteration: "Kūronzu Atakku!" (Japanese: クーロンズ・アタック！)	Toshimasa Suzuki	Hideyuki Kurata	Takashi Kobayashi	October 10, 1997
3	"The Night of Woong-A-Ji"; Transliteration: "Ngaji no Yoru" (Japanese: ンガジの夜)	Noboru Takizawa	Hideyuki Kurata	Toshimasa Suzuki	October 17, 1997
4	"My Rival"; Transliteration: "Mai Raibaru" (Japanese: マイライバル)	Yoshiaki Iwasaki	Hideyuki Kurata	Yoshiaki Iwasaki	October 24, 1997
5	"Arrogance"; Transliteration: "Gōman" (Japanese: 傲慢)	Masahiko Murata	Yōsuke Kuroda	Toshiaki Komura	October 31, 1997
6	"The Return Home"; Transliteration: "Kikan" (Japanese: 帰還)	Takashi Kobayashi	Hideyuki Kurata	Takashi Kobayashi	November 7, 1997
7	"Lamentation"; Transliteration: "Dōkoku" (Japanese: 慟哭)	Toshimasa Suzuki	Yōsuke Kuroda	Toshimasa Suzuki	November 14, 1997
8	"The Sinking Talent"; Transliteration: "Shizumi Yuku Sainō" (Japanese: 沈みゆく才能)	Seiji Mizushima	Hideyuki Kurata	Seiji Mizushima	November 21, 1997
9	"The Thing on the Other Side"; Transliteration: "Sono Mukōgawa ni Aru Mono" (Japanese: その向こう側にあるもの)	Noboru Takizawa	Yōsuke Kuroda	Toshiaki Komura	November 28, 1997
10	"The Promise Resurrected"; Transliteration: "Yomigaeru Yakusoku" (Japanese: 蘇る約束)	Shigeru Yamazaki	Hideyuki Kurata	Takashi Kobayashi	December 5, 1997
11	"Girl Meets Girls"; Transliteration: "Gāru Mītsu Gāruzu" (Japanese: ガール・ミーツ・ガールズ)	Masahiko Murata	Hideyuki Kurata	Takaaki Ishiyama	December 12, 1997
12	"There Go the Three!"; Transliteration: "Sanbiki ga Yuku!" (Japanese: 三匹が行く！)	Ken Ando	Hideyuki Kurata	Naoki Hishikawa	December 19, 1997
13	"There Go the Three Again!"; Transliteration: "Zoku Sanbiki ga Yuku!" (Japanese: 続・三匹が行く！)	Akio Kawamura	Yōsuke Kuroda	Akio Kawamura	December 29, 1997
14	"There Go the New Three!"; Transliteration: "Shin Sanbiki ga Yuku!" (Japanese: 新・三匹が行く！)	Toshimasa Suzuki	Hideyuki Kurata	Takaaki Ishiyama	December 29, 1997
15	"Light"; Transliteration: "Hikari" (Japanese: 光)	Takashi Kobayashi	Yōsuke Kuroda	Takashi Kobayashi	January 9, 1998
16	"Shadows"; Transliteration: "Yami" (Japanese: 闇)	Masahito Otani	Hideyuki Kurata	Takaaki Ishiyama	January 16, 1998
17	"I'm Sorry"; Transliteration: "Gomennasai" (Japanese: ごめんなさい)	Takafumi Hoshikawa	Yōsuke Kuroda	Yoshiaki Iwasaki	January 23, 1998
18	"Reason to Fight"; Transliteration: "Tatakau Riyū" (Japanese: 戦う理由)	Tsuyoshi Yoshimoto	Hideyuki Kurata	Toshimasa Suzuki	January 30, 1998
19	"From Heart, To Heart"; Transliteration: "Furomu Hāto tu Hāto" (Japanese: フロム・ハート トゥ・ハート)	Akio Kawamura	Hideyuki Kurata	Akio Kawamura	February 6, 1998
20	"Friend"; Transliteration: "Tomodachi" (Japanese: ともだち)	Makoto Bessho	Hideyuki Kurata	Takashi Kobayashi	February 13, 1998
21	"Save the Last Dance for Me"; Transliteration: "Rasuto Dansu wa Watashi ni" (Japanese: ラストダンスは私に)	Toshimasa Suzuki	Hideyuki Kurata	Takaaki Ishiyama	February 20, 1998
22	"Farewell and Introductions"; Transliteration: "Sayonara, Konnichi wa" (Japanese: さよなら、こんにちは)	Ken Ando	Hideyuki Kurata	Ken Ando	February 27, 1998
23	"Day of Resurrection"; Transliteration: "Fukkatsu no Hi" (Japanese: 復活の日)	Seiji Mizushima	Hideyuki Kurata	Seiji Mizushima	March 6, 1998
24	"Cultural Catastrophe"; Transliteration: "Minzoku no Saiten" (Japanese: 民族の災典)	Takafumi Hoshikawa	Hideyuki Kurata	Takafumi Hoshikawa	March 13, 1998
25	"Oh, God! The Evil Trap of the Nerilians!"; Transliteration: "Kami yo Nake! Neriri Seijin no Hidoi Wana!" (Japanese: 神よ泣け！ ネリリ星人のひどい罠！)	Makoto Bessho	Hideyuki Kurata	Takashi Kobayashi	March 20, 1998
26	"Goal!"; Transliteration: "Gooru in!" (Japanese: ごぉるいん！)	Katsuhito Akiyama	Hideyuki Kurata	Katsuhito Akiyama	March 27, 1998

==== 2021 series ====
No.	Title	Directed by	Written by	Storyboarded by	Original release date
1	"On Your Marks!"; Transliteration: "On Yua Māku!" (Japanese: オンユアマーク！)	Jirō Arimoto	Yōhei Kashii	Tokihiro Sasaki	April 11, 2021
2	"Dreams Begin to Run"; Transliteration: "Hashiridasu Yume" (Japanese: 走り出す夢)	Yasuyuki Fuse	Yōhei Kashii	Tokihiro Sasaki	April 18, 2021
3	"Individual Feelings"; Transliteration: "Sorezore no Omoi" (Japanese: それぞれの想い)	Sō Takeuchi	Ryōsuke Kobayashi	Kyōhei Yamamoto	April 25, 2021
4	"Crumbling Fair Play"; Transliteration: "Kudake Yuku Seiseidōdō" (Japanese: 砕けゆく正々堂々)	Choi Jongki	Makoto Takada	Ryūichi Baba	May 2, 2021
5	"Because There's Light"; Transliteration: "Hikari wa Aru Kara" (Japanese: 光はあるから)	Tatsu Yamamoto	Yōhei Kashii	Kyōhei Yamamoto	May 9, 2021
6	"The Night Before the Decisive Match"; Transliteration: "Kessen Zen'ya" (Japanese: 決戦前夜)	Yasuyuki Fuse	Ryōsuke Kobayashi	Takashi Iida	May 16, 2021
7	"The Rain That Falls on Destiny"; Transliteration: "Shukumei ni Furu Ame" (Japanese: 宿命にふる雨)	Ryūichi Baba	Yōhei Kashii	Ryūichi Baba	May 23, 2021
8	"Memories"; Transliteration: "Kioku" (Japanese: 記憶)	Han Younghoon	Yōhei Kashii	Tokihiro Sasaki	May 30, 2021
9	"The Power to Accomplish"; Transliteration: "Koto o Nasu Chikara" (Japanese: 事を成す力)	Jirō Arimoto	Makoto Takada	Takashi Iida	June 6, 2021
10	"A World Out of Reach"; Transliteration: "Todokanai Sekai" (Japanese: 届かない世界)	Go Sungwoon	Ryōsuke Kobayashi	Saburō Miura	June 13, 2021
11	"Requests"; Transliteration: "Onegai" (Japanese: お願い)	Itsuki Imazaki	Makoto Takada	Itsuki Imazaki	June 20, 2021
12	"Over the Rainbow"; Transliteration: "Ōbā za Reinbō" (Japanese: オーバー・ザ・レインボー)	Tokihiro Sasaki	Yōhei Kashii	Tokihiro Sasaki	June 27, 2021

== Reception ==
THEM Anime Reviews reviewed the 1997–1998 OVA series and the 1997–1998 TV series, the latter entitled Battle Athletes Victory. For the OVA series, reviewer Tim Jones criticized the art style as "recycled" and said the plot is "no winner" but that the animation and characters is what makes the OVA worth watching. He added that while the series is "hardly revolutionary," it is fun, sweet, and "riddled with eye candy." For Battle Athletes Victory, reviewer Carlos Ross said that it is different from the OVA series, as it has a "more lighthearted feel" and it has a different cast of characters, noting that while there are various stereotypes in this series, along with people of all races, there is humor, like a female character having "a crush on her female superior." Ross also said that while the animation is "beautiful" and it has a lot of "cute girl characters," the storyline is "seemingly inconsequential" and it reminds him of Gunbuster.
