= El-Hazard =

Japanese anime franchise

- Title screen for The Magnificent World

神秘の世界エルハザード (Shinpi no Sekai El-Hazard)
- Genre: Isekai
- Original video animation

El Hazard: The Magnificent World
- Directed by: Hiroki Hayashi
- Produced by: Hiroaki Inoue; Yasuo Hasegawa
- Written by: Ryoe Tsukimura
- Music by: Seikou Nagaoka
- Studio: AIC
- Licensed by: Crunchyroll: BI: Anime Limited
- Released: May 26, 1995 – January 25, 1996
- Runtime: 30 minutes (2–6); 45 minutes (1 & 7)
- Episodes: 7
- Manga
- Written by: Hidetomo Tsubura
- Published by: Fujimi Shobo
- Magazine: Monthly Dragon Age
- Original run: 1995 – 1996
- Volumes: 3
- Anime television series

El-Hazard: The Wanderers
- Directed by: Katsuhito Akiyama
- Produced by: Kazuaki Morijiri; Kyoko Kobayashi
- Written by: Ryoe Tsukimura
- Music by: Seikou Nagaoka
- Studio: AIC
- Licensed by: NA: Nozomi Entertainment
- Original network: TV Tokyo
- Original run: October 6, 1995 – March 29, 1996
- Episodes: 26
- Original video animation

El Hazard: The Magnificent World 2
- Directed by: Yoshiaki Iwasaki
- Produced by: Hiroaki Inoue; Kazuaki Morijiri; Akiko Odawara
- Written by: Kazuhisa Onishi
- Music by: Seikou Nagaoka
- Studio: AIC
- Licensed by: BI: Anime Limited; NA: Nozomi Entertainment
- Released: March 21, 1997 – October 25, 1997
- Runtime: 30 minutes each
- Episodes: 4
- Anime television series

El-Hazard: The Alternative World
- Directed by: Yasuhito Kikuchi
- Produced by: Hiroaki Inoue; Kazuaki Morijiri; Kin'ya Watanabe
- Written by: Mitsuhiro Yamada
- Music by: Seikou Nagaoka
- Studio: AIC
- Licensed by: NA: Nozomi Entertainment
- Original network: TV Tokyo
- Original run: January 8, 1998 – March 25, 1998
- Episodes: 13
- Original video animation

A Night of Captivation, Temptation, and Purification
- Directed by: Yasuhito Kikuchi
- Written by: Mitsuhiro Yamada
- Music by: Seikou Nagaoka
- Studio: AIC
- Licensed by: NA: Pioneer LDC
- Released: 1999

El-Hazard (Japanese: 神秘の世界エルハザード, Hepburn: Shinpi no Sekai Eru Hazādo; lit. "The Magnificent World of El-Hazard") is a Japanese anime franchise written by Ryoe Tsukimura and directed by Hiroki Hayashi. The series was animated by AIC and produced by Pioneer LDC.

There is also a manga adaptation, which is published in English by Viz Media. The series was formerly distributed in the U.S. by Geneon. The distribution rights to the Wanderers TV series were acquired from Geneon by Right Stuf entertainment, announced during a Right Stuf press release on May 18, 2010. The anime was distributed by Right Stuf's publishing label Nozomi Entertainment. Later, during their panel at Anime Expo 2019, they also rescued The Magnificent World and The Alternative World OVAs.

== Plot ==
The story focuses on three high school students, Makoto Mizuhara, Katsuhiko Jinnai and Nanami Jinnai, and the History teacher Masamichi Fujisawa, who are mysteriously transported to the fantastical world of El-Hazard. When they arrive they find themselves in the middle of a war between the human nations and the insectoid Bugrom tribe.

=== The Magnificent World ===
The central conflict in El-Hazard: The Magnificent World (神秘の世界エルハザード, Shinpi no Sekai Eru Hazādo; lit. "The Magnificent World of El-Hazard") focuses on Makoto, who along with Nanami, Mr. Fujisawa and human residents of El-Hazard fight against Jinnai who is made leader of the Bugrom armies by Queen Diva, but meanwhile, other, more sinister machinations lie below the surface.

=== The Wanderers ===
El-Hazard: The Wanderers, known in Japan as simply El-Hazard (エルハザード, Eru Hazādo), takes place in an alternative timeline from the original OVA. It is a simplified version of the original OVA plot, stretched to twenty-six episodes and eliminates or alters several of the OVA's major characters.

=== The Magnificent World 2 ===
El-Hazard: The Magnificent World 2 (神秘の世界エルハザード2, Shinpi no Sekai Eru Hazādo Tsū; lit. "The Magnificent World of El-Hazard 2") is a sequel to the original OVA and features Makoto and the others continuing on in their lives in El-Hazard after the war with the Bugrom has ended. When Mr. Fujisawa suddenly runs off, getting cold feet the night before his wedding with Miz Mishtal, Makoto and the others race off to find him.

=== The Alternative World ===
El-Hazard: The Alternative World (異次元の世界エルハザード, Ijigen no Sekai Eru Hazādo; lit. "A Parallel World to El-Hazard") follows up after the actual wedding of Mr. Fujisawa and Miz Mishtal, but the cast is then thrust into another world for a second time; the militant world of Creteria.

=== El-Hazard's causal loop ===
El-Hazard's plot is made up of a causal loop, an example of the predestination paradox. The first OVA begins with Makoto meeting Ifurita for the first time on Earth. After giving him a warm greeting, revealing that she somehow knows him, she sends him to El-Hazard. Later on in the series, Makoto discovers Ifurita entombed in a labyrinth, where she had been kept since ancient times. Upon this second meeting with Ifurita, Makoto is puzzled by the fact that she does not recognize him, nor does she treat him with the same demeanor she evoked in their first encounter.

Over the course of the series, Makoto manages to free Ifurita from her enslavement to Jinnai (the "master" of the Power Key Staff, and therefore her master). In response, Ifurita comes to love Makoto, but events involving the Eye of God (see below) force her to drift through time and space for ten thousand years until she is eventually entombed under what would later become the site of Shinonome High School. The series then returns to the beginning, this time from Ifurita's perspective. After warmly greeting Makoto, she sends him to El-Hazard in order to trigger all of the events that, from Makoto's perspective, had yet to take place. In the final episode, Ifurita is reunited with an older Makoto who has transported back to her with her key, enabling them both to return to El-Hazard together. An ending montage shows various El Hazard characters apparently now living on Earth.

=== The Eye of God ===
The Eye of God as seen from the ground in The Magnificent World

The Eye of God plays a prominent role in both the OVA and The Wanderers. In both continuities, it is the ultimate superweapon, created by an ancient civilization. Its basic design is that of a giant metallic orb that floats in a geosynchronous orbit within the world's atmosphere.

The Eye of God is a dimensional weapon that sends all it destroys into a vortex leading to an unknown destination. In the first OVA series, its use in ancient times is responsible for pulling the Phantom Tribe from their own world into El-Hazard.

In the OVA continuity, the Eye of God first needed to be unsealed by the Muldoon priestesses before it could be operated via the Stairway to the Sky, a tall metal tower that almost reaches the height of the Eye's orbit. Two female members of the royal house were required in order to activate the weapon, but the Phantom Tribe attempted to get around this barrier by creating a machine that would require the use of only one. The Phantom Tribe also sabotage the Eye, causing it to go out of control when the Princesses Rune Venus and Fatora use it to destroy the Bugrom. It's stopped by Ifurita, who synchronizes with the device and is ultimately lost in time and space for ten thousand years as a result.

In The Wanderers, the Eye is controlled from within rather than from the Stairway to the Sky, and the character Ifurita acts as a key to controlling the weapon. Jinnai attempts to use Ifurita to control the Eye, but once connected, Ifurita's true purpose as the Demon God is revealed, and she attempts to destroy El-Hazard. Makoto stops the Eye from going out of control and is temporarily lost, but finds his way back to El-Hazard at the end of the series.

In The Alternative World, another Eye of God appears, but this one is a shattered version of the original and does not seem to need a princess and three priestesses to unseal it. Its origin is not explained.

== Media ==
The series began as a seven episode OVA produced by the animation studio AIC and Pioneer LDC, and it was entitled as, El-Hazard: The Magnificent World. It was popular enough to be remade into a twenty-six episode TV series, The Wanderers, set in an alternate time-line.

A second four-episode OVA series, El-Hazard: The Magnificent World 2, followed. El-Hazard: The Alternative World is a twelve-episode TV series with a follow-up special later released on laserdisc called "A Night of Captivation, Temptation, and Purification".

El Hazard: The Magnificent World 2, and El Hazard: The Alternative World are continuations of the original OVA (El-Hazard: The Magnificent World) whereas the TV series El Hazard: The Wanderers is a standalone series.

There is also a Sega Saturn visual novel video game inspired from the TV series, with several possible endings.

Guardians of Order released the El-Hazard Role-Playing Game role-playing game based on the first OVA series in 2001 and with rules based on the company's Tri-Stat system.

On August 13, 2018, AIC announced that they were planning to crowdfund a short five minute pilot for a new El Hazard series titled The Dual World. The campaign launched on September 6 of that year but was not successful, raising ¥841,000 out of its ¥5,000,000 goal before closing on October 30.

== List of The Magnificent World and The Magnificent World 2 episodes ==
No.	Title	Japanese release date	English release date
1	"Battlefield of Confusion"; Transliteration: "Konsen no Sekai Eruhazādo" (Japanese: 混戦の世界エルハザード)	May 26, 1995	July 25, 1995
2	"The World of Beautiful Girls"; Transliteration: "Bijo no Sekai Eruhazādo" (Japanese: 美女の世界エルハザード)	June 25, 1995	October 24, 1995
3	"The World of Hot Springs"; Transliteration: "Onsen no Sekai Eruhazādo" (Japanese: 温泉の世界エルハザード)	July 25, 1995	October 24, 1995
4	"The World of the Demon God"; Transliteration: "Kishin no Sekai Eruhazādo" (Japanese: 鬼神の世界エルハザード)	August 25, 1995	December 19, 1995
5	"The World of Thunder"; Transliteration: "Raimei no Sekai Eruhazādo" (Japanese: 雷鳴の世界エルハザード)	October 21, 1995	December 19, 1995
6	"The World of Gleaming Light"; Transliteration: "Senkō no Sekai Eruhazādo" (Japanese: 閃光の世界エルハザード)	November 25, 1995	May 28, 1996
7	"The World of Endless Adventures"; Transliteration: "Eien no Sekai Eruhazādo" (Japanese: 永遠の世界エルハザード)	January 25, 1996	May 28, 1996
8	"The Bride of Roshtaria"; Transliteration: "Roshutaria no Hanayome" (Japanese: ロシュタリアの花嫁)	March 21, 1997	July 14, 1998
9	"The Awakening of Kalia"; Transliteration: "Kaaria Kakusei" (Japanese: カーリア覚醒)	May 25, 1997	July 14, 1998
10	"Ifurita, Farewell to Destiny"; Transliteration: "Ifuriita: Unmei no Wakare" (Japanese: イフリータ・運命の別れ)	August 24, 1997	August 25, 1998
11	"Promise for Reunion"; Transliteration: "Saikai Heno Chikai" (Japanese: 再会への誓い)	October 25, 1997	August 25, 1998

== Reception ==
=== Anime reviews ===
Theron Martin argued that the series doesn't "come close to representing the cream of the crop of '90s anime," and neither did it "establish any new trends or have a marked influence on the course of anime. He also criticized Alielle Relryle for being presented as a "midget flaming lesbian" who sees Princess Fatora Venus as the "only object" of her affection. Chris Beveridge further said, in Mania that he still finds himself "grinning stupidly at many parts of this series." Raphael See said that the series is "remarkable when it counts," referring to the scenery and backgrounds.

=== Soundtrack reviews ===
"As nice as the opening piece and Ifurita's theme may be, the rest of the album doesn't quite succeed at reaching out and grabbing your attention." – Keith Rhee, about "Best of El Hazard" in EX: The Online World of Anime & Manga.
