= List of Gundam Build Fighters episodes =

Cover of the first volume of the DVD release by Bandai Visual.

Gundam Build Fighters (Japanese: ガンダムビルドファイターズ, Hepburn: Gandamu Birudo Faitāzu) is a 2013 Japanese science fiction anime television series based on Sunrise's long-running Gundam franchise. The series is directed by Kenji Nagasaki of No. 6 and written by Yousuke Kuroda of Mobile Suit Gundam 00. Character designs were done by both Kenichi Ohnuki and Suzuhito Yasuda. The series was first unveiled under the name "1/144 Gundam Mobile" project by Sunrise, before its official announcement. In contrast to other Gundam series, Gundam Build Fighters focuses on the Gundam model (Gunpla) aspect of the franchise. The first opening theme "Nibun no Ichi" (ニブンノイチ; lit. 'One Half') by Back-On, and the ending theme "Imagination > Reality" by AiRI were used from episodes 2 to 13. From episodes 14 to 24, "wimp" by Back-On featuring Lil' Fang (from FAKY) was the opening theme while "Han Pan Spirit" (半パン魂（スピリット）, Han Pan Supiritto; lit. 'Short-Pants Spirit') by Hyadain became the ending theme from episodes 14 to 25.

== Episode list ==
| No. | Title | Original release date |
|---|---|---|
| 1 | "Sei and Reiji"; Transliteration: "Sei to Reiji" (Japanese: セイとレイジ) | October 7, 2013 |
Sei Iori is a talented Gunpla builder, but lacks the confidence to become an effective fighter in a Gunpla Battle. One day, he meets Reiji, a mysterious red-haired boy, who displays his exceptional skills as a Gunpla Fighter by defeating Susumu Sazaki with Sei's newly constructed Build Strike Gundam.
| 2 | "The Crimson Comet"; Transliteration: "Kurenai no Suisei" (Japanese: 紅の彗星) | October 14, 2013 |
As Reiji copes with adjusting to Tokyo life, he picks a fight with school council member Monta Gonda. Sei and Reiji defeat Gonda in an exhibition Gunpla Battle, but are immediately bested by Tatsuya Yuuki and his Zaku Amazing.
| 3 | "Full Package"; Transliteration: "Furu Pakkēji" (Japanese: フルパッケージ) | October 21, 2013 |
Sei completes an upgrade to the Build Strike Gundam while Mr. Ral gives Reiji an orientation on Gunpla Battle.
| 4 | "Gunpla Idol Kirara"; Transliteration: "Ganpura Aidoru Kirara" (Japanese: ガンプラアイドル キララ☆) | October 28, 2013 |
Sei meets a mysterious girl at his family's hobby shop, who appears to share his passion for Gunpla. However, he is unaware of her true intentions in Gunpla Battle.
| 5 | "The Strongest Builder"; Transliteration: "Saikyō Birudā" (Japanese: 最強ビルダー) | November 4, 2013 |
Sei and China meet Mao Yasaka, a young Gunpla Fighter from Kansai Prefecture.
| 6 | "A Reason to Battle"; Transliteration: "Tatakau Wake" (Japanese: 戦う理由（わけ）) | November 11, 2013 |
When Yuuki suddenly bows out of competition and takes an indefinite leave from school, Reiji begins to doubt his purpose in Gunpla Battle.
| 7 | "World-Level Ability"; Transliteration: "Sekai no Jitsuryoku" (Japanese: 世界の実力) | November 18, 2013 |
As a reward for winning the Gunpla Battle Japan 3rd Block Championship, Sei and Reiji, along with China, Rinko, and Mr. Ral, take a vacation at a beachfront inn. But their vacation is cut short by a former Gunpla Builder who threatens the innkeeper to give him their property.
| 8 | "Encounters of Fighters"; Transliteration: "Ai Senshi-tachi" (Japanese: 逢（あい）戦士たち) | November 25, 2013 |
Nils Nielsen, a 13-year-old genius, joins the American Qualifying Round of the World Championship to learn more about the secrets of Plavsky particles. Meanwhile, in Finland, Team Nemesis receives a new fighter named Aila Jyrkiainen from the Flana Institute.
| 9 | "Wings of Imagination"; Transliteration: "Sōzō no Tsubasa" (Japanese: 想像の翼) | December 2, 2013 |
China completes her Gunpla Beargguy III (San), and when a painting of it wins the grand prize at the local art exhibit, her rival Caroline Yajima issues her a Gunpla challenge.
| 10 | "The World Tournament Begins"; Transliteration: "Kaimaku! Sekai Taikai" (Japanese: 開幕！世界大会) | December 9, 2013 |
As the 7th Gunpla Battle World Championships begins in Shizuoka, the Gunpla community is in shock when news spreads of reigning champion Carlos Kaiser's defeat at the hands of Aila. Meanwhile, Sei meets the other Gunpla Fighters at the opening party while Reiji encounters Aila at the nearby mall.
| 11 | "Battle Royal"; Transliteration: "Rowaiyaru" (Japanese: ロワイヤル) | December 16, 2013 |
Yuuki makes his World Championship debut as PPSE's Meijin Kawaguchi. Meanwhile, on the second day of the tournament, all of the participants must face each other in a battle royal until only one-third of the lineup remains.
| 12 | "Discharge"; Transliteration: "Disuchāji" (Japanese: ディスチャージ) | December 23, 2013 |
With an unmanned Mega Size Model Zaku sent in to eliminate the Star Build Strike Gundam in the middle of the battle royal, unlikely alliances are formed while Sei and Reiji must unleash Star Build Strike Gundam's trump card to survive.
| 13 | "Battle Weapon"; Transliteration: "Batoru Wepon" (Japanese: バトルウェポン) | January 6, 2014 |
For day three of the tournament, containers with random weapons are placed in the battlefield for the Gunpla Fighters to use in their battle; each contestant is assigned a container number to use. Sei and Reiji are assigned to battle Luang Dallara, who already gave them trouble at the battle royal. Worsening the situation is Reiji's wrist injury from a street fight outside the arena grounds.
| 14 | "Codename: C"; Transliteration: "Kōdonēmu Shī" (Japanese: 暗号名（コードネーム）C) | January 13, 2014 |
Sei and Reiji remain undefeated by the sixth period of the tournament with two more to go, despite Reiji's wrist injury. However, another obstacle appears in front of them in the form of the Gunpla Fighter named "C".
| 15 | "Fighter's Radiance"; Transliteration: "Faitā no Kagayaki" (Japanese: 戦士（ファイター）のかがやき) | January 20, 2014 |
With their loss in the Gunpla race dropping them to 17th place, Sei and Reiji must leave no room for error in the eighth period of the tournament in order to make it to the finals. However, they have to go through Fellini in the process.
| 16 | "Dad, We Meet Again?"; Transliteration: "Saikai, Chichi yo?" (Japanese: 再会、父よ？) | January 27, 2014 |
As Rinko leaves home to join her son, Sei and Reiji's battle with Fellini ends in a draw, but they earn two points, which is enough to land them in the top 16 in the finals. Meanwhile, following a heated argument with Sei over rebuilding the Star Build Strike Gundam, Reiji goes out to buy his own Gunpla, only for him and Aila to receive a crash course in Gunpla building by a mysterious bearded man.
| 17 | "Model of the Heart"; Transliteration: "Kokoro no Katachi" (Japanese: 心の形) | February 3, 2014 |
On the first day of the tournament finals, Mao is scheduled to battle Sei and Reiji. But when he cannot think of a strategy to defeat the Star Build Strike Gundam, he returns to his mentor, Master Chinan, and asks him to teach him the master's ultimate technique.
| 18 | "Bloodhounds"; Transliteration: "Buraddo Haundo" (Japanese: ブラッド・ハウンド) | February 10, 2014 |
After shocking the Gunpla world by defeating Luang on the first round, the Renato Brothers and their GM Sniper K9 set their sights on Meijin Kawaguchi.
| 19 | "Astray's Blade"; Transliteration: "Asutorei no Yaiba" (Japanese: アストレイの刃) | February 17, 2014 |
Sei and Reiji must go through Nils in order to continue their quest for the championship. Desperate to prevent the duo from advancing, Baker offers to have PPSE sponsor Nils, but knowing very well not to trust her, he arranges for a secret meeting with Sei and Reiji to extract the secrets of Plavsky particles from them.
| 20 | "Aila's Betrayal"; Transliteration: "Uragiri no Aira" (Japanese: 裏切りのアイラ) | February 24, 2014 |
Fellini faces Aila in the quarterfinals, much to Sei and Reiji's shock as they finally discover her real identity. Aila is pressured to win the championship due to the arrival of the Team Nemesis Chairman, who has promised the trophy to his grandson for his birthday.
| 21 | "Amid the Glittering Particles"; Transliteration: "Kirameku Ryūshi no Naka de" (Japanese: きらめく粒子の中で) | March 3, 2014 |
Following Aila's revelation as a Gunpla Fighter, an angry Reiji vows to defeat her in the tournament.
| 22 | "Meijin vs. Meijin"; Transliteration: "Meijin Bāsasu Meijin" (Japanese: 名人VS名人) | March 10, 2014 |
Yuuki must prove himself worthy of the name "Meijin Kawaguchi the 3rd" when he battles Julian Ayers Mackenzie, a British Gunpla Fighter who was to have taken that title three years prior.
| 23 | "Gunpla Eve"; Transliteration: "Ganpura Ibu" (Japanese: ガンプラ・イブ) | March 17, 2014 |
A festival is held in Shizuoka one week before the final round of the tournament, where guests can participate in Free Battle rounds against the championship's competitors. Meanwhile, Nils and Caroline follow a truck that leads them to the source of Plavsky particles.
| 24 | "Dark Matter"; Transliteration: "Dāku Matā" (Japanese: ダークマター) | March 24, 2014 |
In the final round of the tournament, Meijin Kawaguchi the 3rd unveils the true form of his Gundam Amazing Exia. However, he brings forth a disturbing aura in the arena reminiscent of his predecessor.
| 25 | "Promise"; Transliteration: "Yakusoku" (Japanese: 約束) | March 31, 2014 |
Sei and Reiji's victory in the tournament causes Chairman Mashita to panic, with his Arista resonating all Plavsky particles in the PPSE Stadium to form a 1/144 scale replica of the Zeon space fortress A Baoa Qu over the facility. The Gunpla Fighters must band together to break into the fortress and destroy the Arista before it produces disastrous results.
| SP | "Gundam Build Fighters: GM's Counterattack"; Transliteration: "Gandamu Birudo Faitāzu Jimu no Gyakushū" (Japanese: ガンダムビルドファイターズ GMの逆襲) | August 25, 2017 |
Four years have passed since the Arista incident that destroyed the PPSE Stadium. As the Gunpla Fighters meet up at the brand new Yajima Stadium to practice for the next day's opening ceremony, Sei discovers that his Build Strike Cosmos has been stolen before everyone is suddenly locked inside the stadium and challenged by the Gunpla Mafia. With Sei piloting his prototype Gunpla Star Burning Gundam, the Gunpla Fighters must make their way through the tower of the Gunpla Mafia's custom battlefield to defeat them and save the sport of Gunpla Battle.
