= Gundam Build Fighters Try =

Japanese anime television series

- ガンダムビルドファイターズトライ
- Genre: Mecha; Science fiction adventure
- Created by: Hajime Yatate; Yoshiyuki Tomino
- Screenplay by: Yousuke Kuroda
- Directed by: Shinya Watada
- Music by: Yuki Hayashi; Asami Tachibana
- Country of origin: Japan
- Original language: Japanese
- No. of episodes: 25 (list of episodes)

Production
- Producers: Makoto Shiriashi (TV Tokyo); Masakazu Ogawa
- Production companies: TV Tokyo; Sotsu; Sunrise

Original release
- Network: TXN (TV Tokyo)
- Release: October 8, 2014 – April 1, 2015

Related
- Light novel

Gundam Build Fighters Honoo Try
- Published by: Hobby Japan
- Magazine: Hobby Japan
- Original run: December 2014 – present
- Anime television film

Gundam Build Fighters Try: Island Wars
- Directed by: Shinya Watada
- Written by: Yousuke Kuroda
- Music by: Yuki Hayashi; Asami Tachibana
- Studio: Sunrise
- Licensed by: NA: Sunrise
- Original network: TXN (TV Tokyo)
- Released: August 21, 2016
- Runtime: 36 minutes
- Related
- Gundam Build Fighters (prequel); Model Suit Gunpla Builders Beginning G (spin-off)

Gundam Build Fighters Try (Japanese: ガンダムビルドファイターズトライ, Hepburn: Gandamu Birudo Faitāzu Torai) is a 2014 Japanese science fiction anime television series based on Sunrise's long-running Gundam franchise, a sequel to the 2013 series Gundam Build Fighters, and the second series within the Gundam Build Series sub-series. Like its predecessor, and in contrast to other Gundam series, Gundam Build Fighters Try features a tournament-based storyline where Gunpla models are built, customized, and battled.

The series is directed by Shinya Watada and written by Yousuke Kuroda, who wrote the first series. Character designs were done by both Kenichi Ohnuki and Suzuhito Yasuda. The series was officially unveiled by Bandai on May 15, 2014, and began airing on TV Tokyo in Japan while streaming on YouTube in limited areas internationally on October 8, 2014. A novel spinoff is currently running in Hobby Japan starting in December 2014.

== Story ==
Seven years after the events of Gundam Build Fighters, the rules of Gunpla have been renewed, and the sport becomes even more popular. However, one academy is left behind in this change, and that was Seiho Academy, which Sei Iori once attended. The only member of the Gunpla Battle Club remaining is Fumina Hoshino, who befriends Sekai Kamiki, a boy who has been training with his master in martial arts and the young Gunpla builder Yuuma Kousaka, and together, they attempt to secure a place in the world championship as the "Try Fighters" (トライ・ファイターズ, Torai Faitāzu).

=== Gunpla Battle ===
Shortly after the Arista that produces Plavsky particles is destroyed in the final episode of the previous season, Plavsky Particle System Engineering (PPSE) is acquired by Yajima Trading while American scientist and Gunpla fighter Nils Nielsen and his girlfriend Caroline Yajima rediscover Plavsky particles aboard the International Space Station. With new Plavsky particles produced, the sport of Gunpla Battle continues worldwide.

In Gundam Build Fighters Try, the one-on-one battle format is replaced by battles between teams of three Gunpla fighters and is divided into two categories: one for players under 19 years old and one for older players.

New rules have been added to the Gunpla battle:

- Non-mobile suit support units such as Core Boosters count as one Gunpla unit.
- Mobile suits that combine such as the ZZ Gundam or Victory Gundam count as one unit, but must be controlled by only one person when separated into multiple units.
- Teams may use only one mobile armor in battle, with all three members piloting it.
- Teams can change Gunpla before each match; changing Gunpla during a match is forbidden.
- Each match has a 15-minute time limit.
- If both teams have the same number of Gunpla left after the time limit expires, the match is declared a draw; each team will select a representative for a one-on-one battle to determine a winner.

In addition, damage levels can now be set on Gunpla Battles. Damage Level C, which inflicts simulated but no physical damage on the Gunpla, is often used in practice rounds. Damage Level B results in simulated damage, but disconnected joints that can easily be fixed. For Damage Level A, Gunpla destroyed in combat are severely damaged physically and will need either replacement parts or a whole new unit altogether.

== Production ==
Gundam Build Fighters Try was first announced by Sunrise on May 15, 2014, as a sequel to Gundam Build Fighters. The new series, which was slated for an October 2014 release, reunited the production staff from the previous series.

In September 2014, Masashi Hirose was hospitalized for an unspecified illness after having recorded his lines as Mr. Ral for the first four episodes. A month later, he was replaced by Katsuhisa Hōki for the rest of the series.

Sunrise would release the series in North America on home video (via Right Stuf) in 2016.

A TV special sequel, titled Gundam Build Fighters Try: Island Wars (Japanese: ガンダムビルドファイターズトライ アイランド・ウォーズ, Hepburn: Gandamu Birudo Faitāzu Torai Airando Wōzu) aired on August 21, 2016.

=== Music ===
The first opening theme is "Cerulean" (セルリアン, Serurian) by Back-On, and the ending theme is "Amazing the World" (アメイジング ザ ワールド, Ameijingu za Wārudo) by Screen Mode.

The second opening theme is "Just Fly Away" by Edge of Life, while the ending theme is "Mayomayo Compass wa Iranai" (迷々コンパスはいらない; "Stray People Do Not Need a Compass") by StylipS. Both songs debuted in episode 14.

The insert song in Gundam Build Fighters Try: Island Wars is "The Last One" by Back-On, while the ending theme is "Roots of Happiness" by Elizabeth Elias.

Preceded by Gundam Reconguista in G	Gundam metaseries (production order); 2014–2015	Succeeded by Mobile Suit Gundam: The Origin
Preceded by Mobile Suit Gundam Thunderbolt	Gundam metaseries (production order); 2016	Succeeded by Mobile Suit Gundam: Twilight AXIS
