= Gundam Build Fighters =

Japanese anime television series

- ガンダムビルドファイターズ
- Genre: Mecha, Science fiction, adventure
- Created by: Hajime Yatate; Yoshiyuki Tomino
- Screenplay by: Yōsuke Kuroda
- Directed by: Kenji Nagasaki
- Music by: Yuki Hayashi
- Country of origin: Japan
- Original language: Japanese
- No. of episodes: 25 (list of episodes)

Production
- Producers: Masakazu Ogawa; Makoto Shiraishi (TV Tokyo)
- Production companies: TV Tokyo; Sotsu; Sunrise

Original release
- Network: TXN (TV Tokyo), AT-X, BS11
- Release: October 7, 2013 – March 31, 2014

Related
- Manga

Gundam Build Fighters Amazing
- Written by: Tomohiro Chiba
- Illustrated by: Kiyoshi Konoyo
- Published by: Kadokawa Shoten
- Magazine: Gundam Ace
- Original run: September 2013 – present
- Volumes: 5
- Light novel

Gundam Build Fighters Honoo
- Published by: Hobby Japan
- Magazine: Hobby Japan
- Original run: December 2013 – November 2014
- Light novel

Gundam Build Fighters Document
- Written by: Tomohiro Chiba
- Published by: ASCII Media Works
- Magazine: Dengeki Hobby Magazine
- Original run: September 2013 – August 2014
- Original net animation

Gundam Build Fighters: Battlogue
- Directed by: Masami Ōbari
- Written by: Yōsuke Kuroda
- Music by: Yuki Hayashi
- Studio: Sunrise
- Licensed by: NA: Sunrise
- Released: August 4, 2017 – December 8, 2017
- Runtime: 11 minutes
- Episodes: 5
- Original net animation

Gundam Build Fighters: GM's Counterattack
- Directed by: Kenji Nagasaki
- Written by: Yōsuke Kuroda
- Music by: Yuki Hayashi
- Studio: Sunrise
- Licensed by: NA: Sunrise
- Released: August 25, 2017
- Runtime: 32 minutes
- Related
- Gundam Build Fighters Try (sequel); Model Suit Gunpla Builders Beginning G (spin-off)

Gundam Build Fighters (Japanese: ガンダムビルドファイターズ, Hepburn: Gandamu Birudo Faitāzu), often abbreviated as GBF, is a 2013 Japanese science fiction anime television series based on Sunrise's long-running Gundam franchise. The series is directed by Kenji Nagasaki of No. 6 and written by Yōsuke Kuroda of Mobile Suit Gundam 00. Character designs were done by both Kenichi Ohnuki and Suzuhito Yasuda. The series was first unveiled under the name "1/144 Gundam Mobile" project by Sunrise, before its official announcement. In contrast to other Gundam series, Gundam Build Fighters focuses on the Gundam plastic model (Gunpla) aspect of the franchise.

The series was officially unveiled by Bandai on July 2, 2013, during the series's live press conference as part of Gundam's 35th anniversary in 2014. It premiered on TXN stations in Japan and on YouTube in limited international markets on October 7, 2013. One Manga adaptation and two photonovels were also announced by Sunrise, and currently running on Gundam Ace (Gundam Build Fighters Amazing), Hobby Japan (Gundam Build Fighters Honno), and Dengeki Hobby Magazine (Gundam Build Fighter Document) magazines.

Gundam Build Fighters is followed by the 2014 sequel Gundam Build Fighters Try, the second series in the then-titled Gundam Build Series. A sequel ONA titled Gundam Build Fighters: GM's Counterattack (Japanese: ガンダムビルドファイターズ GMの逆襲, Hepburn: Gandamu Birudo Faitāzu GM no Gyakushū), which takes place between Build Fighters and Build Fighters Try, was released on August 25, 2017.

== Story ==
Back in the 1980s, the success of the series Mobile Suit Gundam resulted in an economic boom due to sales of the Gundam model kits, or "Gunpla" (ガンプラ, Ganpura), dubbed the Gunpla Boom. Years later, with the success of the second Gunpla Boom, special tournaments called Gunpla Battles are established throughout the world to see which customized Gunpla and its builder are the best. These incredibly popular Gunpla Battles culminate in an annual global tournament.

The story of the first series revolves around Sei Iori, a young Gunpla Builder and student who has a dream of becoming the best Gunpla Fighter in the tournament and someday become as good as his father. As the only child, his family owns a small Gunpla shop and his talent is well-honed, however his weak piloting abilities have led him to a series of first-round losses. But one day, he meets a strange boy named Reiji, who helps him out. Reiji gives him a jewel, promising that he will come to Sei's aid if wished enough. Together, both of them will tackle the world of Gunpla Battle and compete in the tournament using Sei's customized Gunpla, the GAT-X105B Build Strike Gundam.

=== Gunpla Battle ===
The central theme of this series is the Gunpla Battle (ガンプラバトル, Ganpura Batoru), a virtual game that involves the use of Gunpla. Each Gunpla Fighter has a GP Base (GPベース, Jī Pī Bēsu), a device that stores their Gunpla information. Once the GP Bases are set, the Battle System (バトルシステム, Batoru Shisutemu) disperses "Plavsky particles" (プラフスキー粒子, Purafusukī Ryūshi; a portmanteau of "plastic" and "Minovsky particles"), which react only to the plastic material of Gunpla and animate them into the game. The Battle System creates a holographic landscape that simulates a battlefield from different Gundam series, and the battle begins once the Gunpla Fighters set their Gunpla to be scanned by the Plavsky particles. A Gunpla's combat statistics are determined by its build quality; modifications such as adding scratch-built parts and paint weathering will increase its stats. Battle effects such as explosions and beam attacks are faithfully simulated in the Battle System. Consequently, damage sustained during battle is reflected directly on the Gunpla itself, requiring Gunpla Fighters to have spare parts ready for necessary repairs. Scale also plays a major factor in a Gunpla Battle; just like in the real world, a 1/48 scale Mega Size Model Gunpla will dwarf a 1/144 scale opponent in the battlefield.

The Gunpla Battle World Championships tournament begins with eight battles, including a four-person knockout battle, a three-on-three team battle, and the closing one-on-one battle. Five of the battles are revealed only on their scheduled dates. Each contestant receives four points for every battle won. The 16 Gunpla Fighters with the most points will advance to the final tournament, a knockout stage that decides the World Champion.

It is later on revealed that Plavsky particles are processed from Arista (アリスタ, Arisuta), a crystal originating from Reiji's home country of Arian (アリアン).

== Production ==
=== Development ===
The first announcement of the series was made in June 2013 under the name "1/144 Gundam Mobile" project by Sunrise, which revealed a story-line more akin to the OVA Model Suit Gunpla Builders Beginning G. Along with the announcement, several mobile suits would receive their own High Grade Gundam model kits that would tie in to the long running Gunpla plastic model line, the new version of the Gundam Try Age arcade game, and the PlayStation 3/PlayStation Vita game Gundam Breaker.

On August 31, 2013, Sunrise aired the second trailer of the series, which provided additional details about the story, the characters, and the Gundam model kits. On September 30, Sunrise announced that the series would be streamed on YouTube in limited areas across the globe, with a United States release occurring on the same day as the Japanese release. Sunrise would later release the series on home video via Right Stuf in 2016.

=== Music ===
The series' music is composed by Yuuki Hayashi, who composed several music scores for Blood Lad and Robotics;Notes.

The first opening theme "Nibun no Ichi" (ニブンノイチ; lit. 'One Half') by Back-On, and the ending theme "Imagination > Reality" by AiRI were used from episodes 2 to 13. From episodes 14 to 24, "wimp" by Back-On featuring Lil' Fang (from FAKY) was the opening theme while "Han Pan Spirit" (半パン魂（スピリット）, Han Pan Supiritto; lit. 'Short-Pants Spirit') by Hyadain became the ending theme from episodes 14 to 25.

The insert song in Gundam Build Fighters: GM's Counterattack is "Carry on" by Back-On, while the ending theme in Gundam Build Fighters: Battlogue is "Chase Me" by FAKY.

== See also ==
- Plamo-Kyoshiro
- Model Suit Gunpla Builders Beginning G
- Gundam Build Divers
- Little Battlers Experience

Preceded by Mobile Suit Gundam AGE	Gundam metaseries (production order); 2013–2014	Succeeded by Mobile Suit Gundam-san
Preceded by Mobile Suit Gundam The Origin: Loum Arc	Gundam metaseries (production order); 2017–2018	Succeeded by Gundam Build Divers
