= Yōsuke Kuroda =

Japanese screenwriter (born 1968)

Yōsuke Kuroda (Japanese: 黒田 洋介, Hepburn: Kuroda Yōsuke; born 29 March 1968) is a Japanese anime screenwriter from Mie Prefecture, Japan. He has his own studio, Studio Orphee.

Kuroda is noted for his work on authoring the scenario, screenplay, and story composition of the anime series Excel Saga, Please Teacher! and its sequel Please Twins!, Honey and Clover, Mobile Suit Gundam 00, and numerous others. In 2003, Kuroda won the Individual Award at the 8th Animation Kobe event. He has collaborated with fellow screenwriter and novelist Hideyuki Kurata on multiple series, including Goblin Slayer, Hellsing Ultimate, and Drifters.

== Screenwriting ==
A work in bold denotes Kuroda as its head writer.

=== Anime television series ===
- **Tenchi Universe** (1995)
- **Magical Project S** (1996–1997)
- **Battle Athletes Victory** (1997–1998)
- **Trigun** (1998)
- **Android Announcer Maico 2010** (1998)
- **Dual! Parallel Trouble Adventure** (1999)
- **Infinite Ryvius** (1999)
- **Excel Saga** (1999)
- **Omishi Magical Theater: Risky Safety** (1999)
- **Carried by the Wind: Tsukikage Ran** (2000)
- **Puni Puni Poemy** (2001)
- **s-CRY-ed** (2001)
- **Kokoro Library** (2001)
- **Steel Angel Kurumi 2** (2001)
- **Please Teacher!** (2002)
- **Ground Defense Force! Mao-chan** (2002)
- **Tenchi Muyo! GXP** (2002)
- **Please Twins!** (2003)
- **Bottle Fairy** (2003)
- **Gungrave** (2003–2004)
- **Yumeria** (2004)
- **Madlax** (2004)
- **Ring ni Kakero 1** (2004–2011)
- **Best Student Council** (2005)
- **Honey and Clover** (2005–2006)
- **Kishin Houkou Demonbane** (2006)
- **Spider Riders** (2006–2007)
- **Mobile Suit Gundam 00** (2007–2009)
- **Big Windup!** (2007–2010)
- **Phantom ~Requiem for the Phantom~** (2009)
- **Hayate the Combat Butler!!** (2009)
- **Highschool of the Dead** (2010)
- **Softenni** (2011)
- **Maken-ki!** (2011)
- **Waiting in the Summer** (2012)
- **Jormungand** (2012)
- **Btooom!** (2012)
- **Gundam Build Fighters** (2013–2014)
  - **Battlogue** (2017)
  - **GM's Counterattack** (2017)
- **Maken-ki! Two** (2014)
- **SoniAni: Super Sonico The Animation** (2014)
- **Gundam Build Fighters Try** (2014–2015)
- **Wooser's Hand-to-Mouth Life: Mugen-hen** (2015)
- **Valkyrie Drive: Mermaid** (2015)
- **Drifters** (2016)
- **Matoi the Sacred Slayer** (2016)
- **My Hero Academia** (2016–2025)
- **ID-0** (2017)
- **Battle Girl High School** (2017)
- **Mobile Suit Gundam: Iron-Blooded Orphans** (2017)
- **Gundam Build Divers** (2018)
- **Goblin Slayer** (2018)
- **Sword Art Online Alternative Gun Gale Online** (2018)
- **2.43: Seiin High School Boys Volleyball Team** (2021)
- **Birdie Wing: Golf Girls' Story** (2022)
- **Mashle: Magic and Muscles** (2023–present)
- **My Hero Academia: Vigilantes** (2025–2026)
- **Eleceed** (2027)

=== OVAs ===
- Tenchi Muyo! Ryo-Ohki
  - Series 1 (1993)
  - **Series 2** (1994-1995)
  - **Series 3** (2003-2005)
- Trouble Evocation (1996)
- Tattoon Master (1996)
- Fire Emblem: Mystery of the Emblem (1996)
- Magical Girl Pretty Sammy (1996)
- Panzer Dragoon (1996)
- Variable Geo (1997)
- Jungle de Ikou! (1997)
- **Photon: The Idiot Adventures** (1997-1999)
- Geobreeders
  - Get Back the Kitty (1998)
  - Breakthrough (2000)
- Dual! Parallel Trouble Adventure (1999)
- Steel Angel Kurumi Zero (2001)
- **Saint Seiya: Hades Chapter 2 - Inferno** (2006-2008)
- **Hellsing Ultimate** (2006-2012)
- Hayate the Combat Butler!! OVA: Hayate's Interests (2009)
- Model Suit Gunpla Builders Beginning G (2010)
- Highschool of the Dead: Drifters of the DEAD (2011)
- Maken-ki! OVA
  - It's Summer! It's Swimsuits! It's Training Camp! (2012)
  - Takeru Turns Into a Woman!? Naked in a Southern Island! (2013)

=== ONAs ===
- **Bastard!! -Heavy Metal, Dark Fantasy-** (2022)

=== Live action TV ===
- Ultraman Max (2005)
- Holyland (2005)

=== Films ===
- Mobile Suit Gundam 00 the Movie: A Wakening of the Trailblazer (2010)
- Gundam Build Fighters Try: Island Wars (2016)

=== Video game ===
- Bujingai (2003)
