= Gundam Build Divers =

Japanese animation series

- ガンダムビルドダイバーズ
- Genre: Mecha, action, science fiction
- Created by: Hajime Yatate; Yoshiyuki Tomino
- Developed by: Noboru Kimura
- Directed by: Shinya Watada
- Music by: Hideakira Kimura
- Country of origin: Japan
- Original language: Japanese
- No. of episodes: 25 (list of episodes)

Production
- Producers: Yosuke Takabayashi (TV Tokyo); Masakazu Ogawa
- Production companies: TV Tokyo; Sotsu; Sunrise

Original release
- Network: TXN (TV Tokyo)
- Release: April 3 – September 25, 2018

Related
- Original net animation

Gundam Build Divers: Prologue
- Directed by: Shinya Watada
- Written by: Noboru Kimura
- Music by: Hideakira Kimura
- Studio: Sunrise
- Licensed by: NA: Sunrise
- Released: February 2, 2018
- Runtime: 24 minutes
- Manga

Gundam Build Divers Break
- Written by: Ryōji Sekinishi
- Illustrated by: Shiitake Gensui; Harakazu Hiro; Takayuki Yanase
- Published by: Kadokawa Shoten
- Magazine: Gundam Ace
- Original run: June 2018 – October 2019
- Volumes: 2
- Light novel

Gundam Build Divers GIMM & BALL's World Challenge
- Written by: Yuichi Nomura
- Illustrated by: Junya Ishigaki; NAOKI
- Published by: ASCII Media Works
- Magazine: Dengeki Hobby Magazine
- Original run: June 2018 – April 2019
- Related
- Gundam Build Divers Re:RISE (sequel)

Gundam Build Divers (Japanese: ガンダムビルドダイバーズ, Hepburn: Gandamu Birudo Daibāzu). often abbreviated as GBD. is a Japanese science fiction anime television series produced by Sunrise, a spiritual successor to the 2013 anime Gundam Build Fighters, and the third series within the Gundam Build Series sub-series, based on the long-running Gundam franchise. It is directed by Shinya Watada (Gundam Build Fighters Try) and written by Noboru Kimura (SoltyRei, Dragonar Academy) with character designs by Juri Toida. It was first teased in December 2017 under the title "Gundam Build Next Battle Project" until its official reveal in The Gundam Base Tokyo on February 2, 2018. It premiered on all TXN network stations in Japan on April 3, 2018. Unlike the previous series, which focuses on the Gundam model (Gunpla) aspect of the franchise, Gundam Build Divers focuses on a virtual reality massively multiplayer online game in terms of themes and battles.

A sequel series, Gundam Build Divers Re:Rise, was announced on November 21, 2018, and was released in October 2019 as part of the 40th-anniversary celebration of the Gundam franchise. Shinya Watada is returning to direct the series at Sunrise Beyond, with Yasuyuki Muto as scriptwriter, Shuri Toida as character designer, and Hideakira Kimura as music composer.

A prologue original net animation was aired by Sunrise on February 2, 2018, while two sidestories began serialization in June 2018 on both Gundam Ace and Dengeki Hobby Magazine respectively.

== Plot ==
In the near future, where the Gundam franchise is at its peak and the popularity of Gunpla is soaring to new heights, a new virtual reality massively multiplayer online game (VRMMO) game called Gunpla Battle Nexus Online (GBN) is made. In Gunpla Battle Nexus Online, players can upload themselves and their Gunpla online through the virtual space and battle with players from across the world. In the game itself, the player assumes the role of a Gunpla Diver, and each year a special tournament called "Gunpla Force Battle Tournament" is held to prove who is the best Gunpla Diver. The story revolves around Riku Mikami, a 14-year-old junior high school student and an admirer of famous Gunpla Diver Kyoya Kujo. He and his friends Yukio and Momoka love Gunpla and play GBN together. However, his own life changes as he meets a mysterious female Diver named Sarah as strange events take place in the GBN with the appearance of Mass-Divers. Now guided by his new allies, he forms their first Gunpla Diver group, embarking on epic adventures with his friends and to see who is the best fighter in the GBN world which would soon bring unforeseen forces to Gunpla.

== Characters ==
=== Build Divers ===
Riku Mikami (ミカミ・リク, Mikami Riku) / Riku (リク)
Voiced by: Yūsuke Kobayashi (Japanese), Erik Scott Kimerer (English)
Leader of the Force "Build Divers" (ビルドダイバーズ, Birudo Daibāzu), he is a 14-year-old middle school student who looks to follow in the footsteps of his idol, Gunpla Battle champion Kyoya Kujo, however he didn't know he ended up following similar footsteps to one of the champion's force's best members. Riku's Gunpla is the GN-0000DVR Gundam 00 Diver, later upgraded to the GN-0000DVR/A Gundam 00 Diver Ace. After the Diver Ace is destroyed in a battle with Tsukasa, Riku rebuilds it from scratch into the GN-0000DVR/S Gundam 00 Sky.
Yukio Hidaka (ヒダカ・ユキオ, Hidaka Yukio) / Yukki (ユッキー, Yukkī)
Voiced by: Natsumi Fujiwara (Japanese); Erica Mendez (English)
Riku's classmate and best friend. He is a fan of Gundam and has extensive knowledge of the franchise. His Gunpla is the RGM-86RBM GM III Beam Master and later, the RGM-89BM Jegan Blast Master.
Momoka Yashiro (ヤシロ・モモカ, Yashiro Momoka) / Momo (モモ)
Voiced by: Nene Hieda (Japanese); Cassandra Lee Morris (English)
Riku and Yukio's classmate and a member of the girls' soccer club. She tries to drag Riku and Yukio to the soccer club at first, but ends up getting interested in GBN instead. After piloting a rented Kapool during the first time she logged into GBN, she was inspired by it to create her own Gunpla, the PEN-01M Momokapool.
Sarah (サラ, Sara)
Voiced by: Haruka Terui (Japanese); Kayli Mills (English)
A mysterious girl Riku and Yukki meet on their first day in GBN. Despite being part of the Build Divers, she has no Gunpla and usually rides with Riku. She was revealed by the AI system to be an "EL-Diver", an electronic lifeform created by the Gunpla's feelings and emotions through GBN's cyberspace. The proof was made when the AI system discovered she has no human identity. Her mind and data are later transferred to a real Gunpla, the HER-SELF Mobile Doll Sarah, which is capable of interacting with others and roams around in the real world as well as logging in as a regular GBN user. Later on it is revealed that she is NOT the first EL-Diver to exist nor the only one, especially not an only child and her appearance's colors embodied a legacy.
Koichi Nanase (ナナセ・コウイチ, Nanase Kōichi) / KO-1 (コーイチ, Kōichi)
Voiced by: Atsushi Tamaru (Japanese); Kyle McCarley (English)
A veteran Gunpla builder who builds rental units for The Gundam Base Tokyo. Formerly nicknamed "K-1" (ケイワン, Kei Wan), Koichi was ranked third in the Japanese Gunpla Championship and eighth in the World Tournament, but when Gunpla Battle evolved from the physical-based GP Duel (GPD) to GBN, his Gunpla team quit the hobby, leaving him in a state of depression for four years. When Koichi sees Riku and his friends rebuilding all of his old Gunpla, he agrees to join the Build Divers, piloting the RMS-117G11 Galbaldy Rebake. At the same time, he gets a job at The Gundam Base Tokyo.
Aya Fujisawa (フジサワ・アヤ, Fujisawa Aya) / Ayame (アヤメ)
Voiced by: Manami Numakura (Japanese); Cherami Leigh (English)
A high schooler and a female diver dressed as a kunoichi, she is tasked by Tsukasa to keep an eye on Riku and his friends, but eventually grows fond of them, becoming part of the team for good. She pilots the RX-零 RX-Zeromaru, an SD Gunpla that is accompanied by a remote-controlled armored eagle, the Armed Armor Hattori. Both can combine into the stronger "Real Mode". In the battle against Avalon and the Second Coalition of Volunteers, she upgraded her Gunpla into the RX-零/覚醒 RX-Zeromaru (Shinki Kessho).
Nanami Nanase (ナナセ・ナナミ, Nanase Nanami) / Nami (ナミ)
Voiced by: Kanae Itō (Japanese); Reba Buhr (English)
An employee of The Gundam Base Tokyo who is Koichi's younger sister and a friend of Riku and Yukki. She also grows tomatoes on the mall's roof garden and later joins the Build Divers in GBN as a support member.

=== GBN Users ===
Kyoya Kisugi (キスギ・キョウヤ, Kisugi Kyōya) / Kyoya Kujo (クジョウ・キョウヤ, Kujō Kyōya)
Voiced by: Jun Kasama (Japanese); Mark Whitten (English)
Leader of "Team Avalon" (チームアヴァロン, Chīmu Avaron) and the highest-ranked Gunpla Diver. Following his championship match against Rommel, Kyoya goes undercover in the GBN world to investigate the presence of "Mass-Divers" (マスダイバー, Masu Daibā), players who use illegal software to upgrade their Gunpla and cause bugs in the game. His Gunpla is the AGE-IIMG Gundam AGEII Magnum. In the real world, his hair color is brown.
Rommel (ロンメル, Ronmeru)
Voiced by: Shō Hayami (Japanese); Patrick Seitz (English)
Leader of the "7th Panzer Division" (第七機甲師団, Dai Nana Kikōshidan), the second highest-ranked Gunpla Diver, GBN's top strategist, and Kyoya's arch-rival. Despite their rivalry they are still very good friends. His avatar in the GBN world has the form of an ermine. His Gunpla is the GH-001RB Grimoire Red Beret.
Magee (マギー, Magī)
Voiced by: Taishi Murata (Japanese); Doug Erholtz (English)
A flamboyant Diver and leader of "Adam's Apple" (アダムの林檎, Adamu no Ringo) who becomes Riku and Yukki's navigator and mentor in GBN. Magee is 23rd overall in the GBN world ranking. His Gunpla is the ZGMF-X20A-LP Gundam Love Phantom. He tends to talk in an exaggerated effeminate fashion called "Onee-kotoba" (older-sister-speech), even in the real world.
Do-ji (ドージ, Dōji)
Voiced by: Yoshitsugu Matsuoka (Japanese); Derek Stephen Prince (English)
Ogre's younger brother who bullies rookie Divers for their points in GBN. On Riku and Yukki's first day Do-ji tricks them into exiting the training stage into Free Battle Mode so he can destroy their Gunpla, but despite damaging Yukki's GM III Beam Master, he loses to Riku's Gundam 00 Diver. His Gunpla is the xvt-mmc Geara Ghirarga. He later apologizes to all Build Diver members because of his shameful actions, including bullying rookie Divers and the usage of the Break Decal. He was later mentioned by Yukki, wanting to introduce himself in the real world but was busy on other matters.
Hellfire Ogre (獄炎のオーガ, Gokuen no Ōga)
Voiced by: Wataru Hatano (Japanese); Greg Chun (English)
Leader of "Hyakki" (百鬼), who is determined to defeat Kyoya to become the new world champion, and Riku's arch-rival. His Gunpla is the GNX-803OG Ogre GN-X and later, the RX-78GP02R Gundam GP-Rase-Two.
Kotaro Ogami (オオガミ・コタロー, Ōgami Kotarō) / Tigerwolf (タイガーウルフ, Taigāurufu)
Voiced by: Junichi Suwabe (Japanese); Kaiji Tang (English)
Leader of "Torabuyru" (虎武龍) and an acquaintance of Magee, his GBN world avatar is in the form of an anthropomorphic wolf. Tigerwolf trains Riku and Yukki in honing their skills as Divers. His Gunpla is the XXXG-01S2龍虎狼 Gundam Jiyan Altron. After hearing Sarah is an electronic lifeform, he became a freelance diver and teamed up with the Build Divers. His human identity is similar to that of a fitness trainer.
Ruck Arge (リュック・アルジェ, Ryukku Aruje) / Shahryar (シャフリヤール, Shafuriyāru)
Voiced by: Ryōta Ōsaka (Japanese); Todd Haberkorn (English)
Leader of "Simurgh" (シームルグ, Shīmurugu) and a veteran Diver, who is among the top two Gunpla builders in GBN. Shahryar is very passionate about Gunpla, struggling to find love within a kit's construction, build quality, and presentation. His Gunpla is the GN-1001N Seravee Gundam Scheherazade. His human identity is of a wealthy foreigner, much to everyone's shock, except Magee.
Rose (ローズ, Rōzu)
Voiced by: Mariko Higashiuchi (Japanese); Tamara Ryan (English)
A member of Force Hyakki. A female Diver who pilots the Jagd Doga Thorn, her strength has been recognized by Ogre himself.

=== Other characters ===
Tsukasa Shiba (シバ・ツカサ, Shiba Tsukasa)
Voiced by: Taku Yashiro (Japanese); Khoi Dao (English)
Once a member of Koichi's GPD club, he loathes GBN not only because it replaces GPD, but according to him, GBN does not have the thrills of a true battle, with players fighting at the risk of getting their Gunpla damaged or even destroyed. Thus he started distributing the "Break Decals", illegal programs that boost a Gunpla's capabilities, but creates several bugs in the GBN system, with the intention of destroying it. He later joins forces with Koichi in his plan to make use of a Break Decal to save Sarah without running the risk of breaking GBN, known as a Build Decal. His Gunpla is the MBF-PNN Gundam Astray No-Name. Despite successfully saving Sarah, he is still avoiding loose ends away from Kyoya, Magee, Kotaro and Ruck Arge because of his past actions.
Kanari (ナスターシャ, Nasutāsha)
Voiced by: Kanako Sakuragi (Japanese); Faye Mata (English)
Game Master (ゲームマスター, Gēmumasutā) / Katsuragi (カツラギ, Katsuragi)
Voiced by: Eiji Takemoto (Japanese); Armen Taylor (English)
The administrator of the GBN who oversees its functioning. His avatar is based on a SD Gundam Force character Gundiver.
Miss Tori (ミス・トーリ, Misu Tōri)
Voiced by: Mai Nakahara (Japanese); Ryan Bartley (English)
The developer and creator of the GBN. Her avatar is based on the Crystal Phoenix from SD Sengokuden Densetsu no Daishogun.

== Production ==
The series was first teased after the airing of the 5th episode of Gundam Build Fighters: Battlogue in December 2017, with the working title "Gundam Build Next Battle Project" On the official press conference held in The Gundam Base Tokyo in Japan reveals the series after the prologue ONA is streamed. Though Gunpla battles is the main aspect of the series, virtual reality and massively multiplayer online game games with will be part of series's theme in terms of the series's storyline and also the theme surrounding Gunpla Battle Nexus Online. Alongside the reveal, several character designs were revealed for both the prologue ONA and the anime as well as the main mechas of the series. Staff members from Gundam Build Fighters also returned to produce the anime, with some of the mecha are designed by Kunio Okawara, Kanetake Ebikawa, Junya Ishigaki, Ippei Gyobu, Kenji Teraoka, Shinya Terashima, Takayuki Yanase, and Naohiro Washio. Mecha battles in the series are directed by Masami Obari alongside animators Shinya Kusumegi and Sakiko Uda.

== Media ==
=== Anime ===
The anime premiered on all TXN network stations in Japan on April 3, 2018, replacing Idol Time PriPara on its initial timeslot. The opening and ending themes from Episodes 1–13 are "Diver's High" is by Sky-Hi and "Ashita e" (明日へ; lit. 'To Tomorrow') is by Iris in Japanese while the opening and ending themes from Episodes 14–25 are "Infinity" by SWANKY DANK and "Start Dash" by Spira Spica. The series' music is composed by Hideakira Kimura. A prologue ONA titled Gundam Build Divers Prologue was first streamed at The Gundam Base Tokyo on February 2, 2018, and later released on YouTube on the same date. The series is also streamed at Sunrise's "GundamInfo" channel on YouTube with subtitles in English, among other languages. In 2018, Sunrise had Bang Zoom Entertainment to produce an English dub for the series. The series was later streamed on Funimation's FunimationNow streaming service in North America on March 28, 2019.

A sequel, titled Gundam Build Divers Re:Rise premiered in October 2019 on Sunrise's new "Gundam Channel" on YouTube. Most of the staff members returned to reprise their roles.

No.	Title	Original release date
0	"Prologue"; Transliteration: "Purorōgu" (Japanese: プロローグ)	February 2, 2018
At the 14th Gunpla Force Tournament Finals, Team Avalon and the 7th Panzer Division engage in a 10-on-10 team battle where the first Force to take out the opposing Force's Flag MS wins. Team Avalon enters the asteroid base and split up to look for the 7th Panzer Division's Flag MS. Kyoy a engages Rommel and Kurt in one side of the asteroid, but his Gundam AGEII Magnum is pinned against the wall by Kurt's suicide attack. Karuna and Emilia battle a Bawoo elsewhere and discover that both halves of the enemy MS are piloted separately, making them realize there is one more enemy out there than expected. A massive beam attack from a Big Gun destroys Kurt's Geara Doga and heavily damages the Gundam AGEII Magnum, but Kyoya uses the last of his strength to battle Rommel. Before Kyoya and Rommel finish each other off, Karuna and Emilia eliminate a Zudah that is the 7th Panzer Division's actual Flag MS, giving Team Avalon the victory. (Chronologically this takes place in between episodes 2 and 3)
1	"Welcome to GBN"	April 3, 2018
After watching a Gunpla battle, Riku and Yukio decide to become Gunpla fighters, with Riku deciding to build a 00 Gundam while Yukio picks a GM III. With their Gunpla built, the two log into the Gundam Battle Nexus where they are met by Magee, one of the top ranked Gunpla fighters who also works as a Navigator to assist new players. Magee guides Riku and Yukio through a tutorial battle where they learn to control their Gunpla. After the tutorial, Riku receives a distress call and goes to investigate, finding a mysterious, unconscious girl who apparently has no memories of what happened to her. They also encounter another player named Do-ji, who tricks Riku into entering a Free Battle with him. Thanks to help from Yukio and encouragement from the girl, Riku is able to defeat Do-ji and win his very first Gunpla battle. However, the girl disappears when the boys reunite with Magee. Despite the rough first experience, both Riku and Yukio become even more excited about Gunpla battles. Little did Riku know he made a connection to his idol because of that girl that he and Yukio helped.
2	"Chaotic Ogre"; Transliteration: "Hyakki Ōga" (Japanese: 百鬼オーガ)	April 10, 2018
Riku and Yukio dive for another GBN session to test the Gundam 00 Diver's Trans-Am capabilities. There, they exchange friend requests with Sarah, the girl they met in the previous session, and discover she does not have a registered Gunpla. They take a Collect mission where they can roam freely around the world map and collect fire-weed flowers for Magee. As Riku engages Trans-Am mode, the Gundam malfunctions, and Sarah begs him not to engage the system again. They made it to the fire-weed garden and take a memorial photo of their first mission, unaware at the time that a certain couple had been there looking for inspiration for gunpla building a few years prior. While roaming around the forest, they encounter Do-ji and Hellfire Ogre before the latter is challenged to a Gunpla Battle by another Force. Riku winds up in the battle while protecting Yukio and Sarah, and he and Ogre defeat the opposing Force's Dom Test Type units before Ogre challenges Riku to a Trans-Am duel. The Gundam 00 Diver's GN Drives explode and the Ogre GN-X prepares the killing blow, but Sarah intervenes. Ogre decides to spare Riku and he and Do-ji retreat. Back at the hangar, Riku promises to Sara that he will never use Trans-Am again until he is strong enough to properly control it. Upon exiting GBN, Riku and Yukio see Momoka, who had followed them, being forced by Nanami to try out different costumes at The Gundam Base.
3	"The Protector"; Transliteration: "Mamoru Mono" (Japanese: 守る者)	April 17, 2018
Momoka joins Riku and Yukio on their next GBN session, only to discover her guest avatar as a pink Haro. Riku and Yukio take a Serial Mission to try out their new upgrades before they are joined by a masked man named Kyoya. They manage to clear the first three phases of the mission, but as they prepare for the phase 4 boss, they encounter a trio of Mass-Divers piloting Jegans. Just as both Forces engage in battle, the Devil Gundam makes a sudden appearance and destroys the Jegans. Kyoya uses his Gundam AGE 2 Dark Hound to shield Sarah and Momoka from the Devil Gundam's beam cannon, revealing himself as GBN Champion Kyoya Kujo. With the help of Riku and Yukio, Kyoya destroys the Devil Gundam to clear the mission. Kyoya explains to Riku and his friends that he was investigating the presence of Mass-Divers in low-rank missions, resulting in bugs in the game. He then exchanges friend requests with them so they can help him protect the GBN world. Originally Kyoya planned to due the mission with a friend who couldn't make it, who has yet to be revealed.
4	"Tigerwolf of the Sacred Mountain"; Transliteration: "Reizan no Korō" (Japanese: 霊山の虎狼)	April 24, 2018
Momoka rents a Kapool kit for her first GBN session. To improve their Gunpla building skills, Riku and his friends venture to the Estonia Area to meet the Torabuyru and its leader known as Tigerwolf. After some coercing by Momo and Sarah, Tigerwolf agrees to train Riku and Yukki into assimilating themselves into their Divers, mastering their building skills, and differentiating the virtual world from reality. During their training, Tigerwolf is challenged by the bounty hunter Daniel of Desperado and his Tequila Gundam. When Tigerwolf is injured during the attack, Riku and Yukki challenge Daniel, but are overwhelmed by his higher skill level. Tigerwolf re-emerges in his Gundam Jiyan Altron and swiftly defeats the bounty hunter. After the battle, he explains to Riku and Yukki that they must reach Rank C to unlock special skills and they should learn to develop their own special attacks. Riku continues to modify his Gundam 00 Diver while a mysterious pair observe him in the game.
5	"Holy Land of Perisia"; Transliteration: "Seichi Perishia" (Japanese: 聖地・ペリシア)	May 1, 2018
Riku and his friends venture to the city of Perisia, where Gunpla builders display their prized works and exchange techniques with other Divers. Upon their arrival, they learn of the presence of Shahryar, a top Gunpla builder in GBN. A group of Mass-Divers arrive in the city, pretending to be Shahryar, but a masked female Diver named Ayame quickly calls them out as imposters attempting to steal customization techniques from other Divers. Later, Riku and his friends spot the imposters' Xamdrag leaving the city with an unconscious Ayame. As they did not bring their Gunpla local builder lends them his Ptolemaios to go after the Mass-Divers. While Momo and Sarah rescue Ayame, Riku and Yukki defeat the poorly built Xamdrag with the Ptolemaios, but the Xamdrag transforms into a Gundam-type suit. The builder arrives and reveals himself as the real Shahryar before using his Seravee Gundam Scheherazade to destroy the Mass-Divers' Gunpla. After the battle, Shahryar offers Riku and his friends to join his Force, but Tigerwolf urges them to join Toraburyu instead. As he wants to find his own style and strength, Riku declines both offers and decides to form his own Force with Yukki, Momo, and Sarah. Riku was unaware at the time that eventually a part of Shahryar would become part of his force that he was about to make.
6	"Past and Future"; Transliteration: "Kako to Mirai" (Japanese: 過去と未来)	May 8, 2018
Shahryar suggests for Riku to scout for an experienced Diver to join his Force, starting with the person who build Momo's rental Kapool. Riku, Yukki, and Momo visit Nanami's brother Koichi Nanase and invite him to join their Force, but he declines their invitation, as he has retired from Gunpla Battle. They learn from Nanami that Koichi retired four years ago during the time GBN evolved from the physical based GP Duel (GPD), when his teammates left him and he fell into a state of depression. Upon hearing from Riku that Shahryar still praises him, Koichi enters GBN to learn more about Riku and his Force. Meanwhile, Riku, Yukki, and Momo activate an old GPD machine in The Gundam Base's storage room and watch Koichi's team's battle footage. Nanami drags Koichi into the store to show that Riku and his friends are repairing all of his old Gunpla, which brings him in tears. He agrees to join their Force as long as they use their own Gunpla. In GBN, Riku experiences a problem registering his Force because Koichi is still a Rank F user; thus, the Force changes its focus to raise Koichi's rank to D for them to become official.
7	"Force Battle"; Transliteration: "Fōsu Sen" (Japanese: フォース戦)	May 15, 2018
After helping Koichi reach Rank D, Riku successfully registers his "Build Divers" Force. Riku and Yukki select a 5-on-5 elimination Event Battle for their Force's debut. To prepare for the battle, Riku fabricates a new backpack for his Gundam 00 Diver using The Gundam Base Factory Zone's injection molding machine while Koichi helps Momoka build her Gunpla from scratch. After Ayame is added to the roster, the Force discusses strategies for the battle. On the day of the Event Battle, the Build Divers meet Rommel, who introduces new members of the 7th Panzer Division as their opponents. Using the element of surprise, the Build Divers outsmart and defeat their opponents, much to Rommel's dismay, unaware that a certain young boy was watching them from faraway. The Build Divers earn Rommel's respect and promise a rematch in the near future. Riku gives Sarah a pendant for saving him during his encounter with Ogre before the Build Divers take a group photo.
8	"Festival!"; Transliteration: "Fesu!" (Japanese: フェス!)	May 22, 2018
Following their triumphant debut, the Build Divers receive a flood of challenge requests from other Forces. Before they can act, however, Magee tells them to join the Force Festival and participate in its different contests. The Build Divers attend the Beargguy Festival, despite Ayame showing no interest in it. There, they meet Kanari and Stea of the Archangels, an all-girl Force. Later, the Build Divers and the Archangels participate in the "Beargguy Quest" mission, where they search for clues to win a limited edition Mushagguy. Riku follows Ayame to the next major clue, only to be attacked by Stea, who engages Break Decal on her Gaia Gundam and causes bugs to occur within the festival. Riku confronts Stea and convinces her to disengage Break Decal, restoring the festival back to normal. Elsewhere, Do-ji meets up with Tsukasa in a back alley.
9	"Return of the Ogre"; Transliteration: "Ōga Futatabi" (Japanese: オーガ再び)	May 29, 2018
The Build Divers are given their first monthly Battle-Random mission, and their opponents are Hyakki, led by Ogre. Despite Yukki's doubts about a rematch with Ogre, Riku proceeds with the mission to test all of the skills the Force has learned from their first encounter with Ogre. However, Riku insists on keeping his promise to Sarah to not use Trans-Am. During the battle, Do-ji deviates from Hyakki's strategy and charges towards Riku, only to be defeated in hand-to-hand combat. Ogre arrives to challenge Riku, but Do-ji activates Break Decal on his Geara Ghirarga and interferes with the duel, much to Ogre's dismay. Seeing that Do-ji no longer has control of his Gunpla, Riku and Ogre team up and use the Geara Ghirarga's weapons against it to stop the Break Decal phenomenon before Ogre orders his Force to withdraw from the battle. Despite using Break Decal, Do-ji is reminded by his teammates why Ogre included him in Hyakki. Elsewhere, Kyoya and Rommel investigate the destruction of the 7th Panzer Division at the hands of Mass-Divers.
10	"Coalition of Volunteers"; Transliteration: "Yūji Rengō" (Japanese: 有志連合)	June 5, 2018
When Kyoya learns from the Game Master that the GBN administration cannot do anything about the Mass-Diver incidents due to a lack of evidence, he invites several Forces into Avalon's Force Nest and proposes to establish a Coalition of Volunteers, with the intent to identify the mastermind behind the distribution of Break Decals. Rommel warns all volunteers that the Break Decals now have regenerative abilities, which is how the Mass-Divers wiped out his Force. One volunteer meets up with Tsukasa, who has already learned about the covert mission and forces the volunteer to log out. Riku is informed that Hyakki declined the invitation and placed themselves on a self-imposed suspension due to Do-ji's use of a Break Decal, but Ogre had recommended the Build Divers to participate. Kyoya has a beginners' server sealed off for the Coalition to flush out the Mass-Divers. Despite sustaining heavy casualties, the Coalition storms through the satellite base. Kyoya falls into a trap and confronts a Providence Gundam while Riku and Ayame follow Sarah's instincts and head for Tsukasa's location, only for Ayame to reveal herself as one of the Mass-Divers.
11	"Ayame's Tears"; Transliteration: "Ayame no Namida" (Japanese: アヤメの涙)	June 12, 2018
Ayame reveals why she is working for Tsukasa, and Riku attempts to dissuade her. Meanwhile, the vicious battle between the Coalition and the Mass Divers continues.
12	"Shining Wings"; Transliteration: "Hikaru Tsubasa" (Japanese: 光る翼)	June 19, 2018
Riku and the others finally corner Tsukasa, who summons a massive Gunpla whose Break Decal spreads critical failures across all GBN. When all hope is about to be lost, Riku and Sarah join together to power up the 00 Diver Ace and create a miracle.
13	"Duel"; Transliteration: "Dyueru -Kettō-" (Japanese: デュエル‐決闘‐)	June 26, 2018
The Mass Divers' incident is solved, but Tsukasa challenges Riku for a one on one match in the real world. In the occasion, Riku's beliefs clash with Tsukasa's, as he feels the thrill and despair of fighting with his own Gunpla in the line.
14	"A New Power"; Transliteration: "Atarashī Chikara" (Japanese: 新しい力)	July 3, 2018
The 00 Diver Ace was destroyed in the battle with Tsukasa, but Riku decides to take into heart what he learned so far to rebuild it into an even more powerful Gunpla.
15	"Lotus Challenge"; Transliteration: "Rōtasu Charenji" (Japanese: ロータス・チャレンジ)	July 10, 2018
The Build Divers take a challenge that not even the best forces in GBN succeeded in completing. In the occasion, Riku displays the true power of his new Gunpla, the Gundam 00 Sky.
16	"Friends Reunited"; Transliteration: "Saikai, Tomo yo" (Japanese: 再会、友よ)	July 17, 2018
With the prize money from the Lotus Challenge, the Build Divers agree to buy an island to make it their new base, but another force is also interested to buy the island and they decide to settle the matter with a battle. In the occasion, Ayame reunites with some old friends of hers.
17	"Joint Front"; Transliteration: "Kyōdō Sensen" (Japanese: 共同戦線)	July 31, 2018
Yukki feels that with Riku's rapid progress he is lagging behind, and by Magee's suggestion, he participates in a special challenge to improve himself. In the occasion, he meets Do-ji, who is having similar issues, and both decide to take the challenge together.
18	"A Man's Will"; Transliteration: "Otoko no Iji" (Japanese: 男の意地)	August 7, 2018
A special tournament is held by Torabuyru with Tigerwolf inviting Riku for a match to measure their abilities.
19	"Nadeshiko-athlon"; Transliteration: "Nadeshikoasuron" (Japanese: ナデシコアスロン)	August 14, 2018
A special girls-only event is held in GBN, and Nanami decides to enter GBN for the first time in order to participate on it.
20	"The Truth"; Transliteration: "Shinjitsu" (Japanese: 真実)	August 21, 2018
Nanami joins the Build Divers and they engage in several activities together, until the GBN administration discovers that Sarah is unwillingly causing the recent bugs that is threatening the system. Meanwhile, the creator of GBN contacts the Build Divers and reveal the secret behind Sarah's origin.
21	"Your Feelings"; Transliteration: "Kimi no Omoi" (Japanese: 君の想い)	August 28, 2018
GBN's entire populace is chasing after Sarah, giving the threat her existence is to the entire system. While looking for her, Riku is attacked by Ogre, who is determined to have a showdown with him at any cost. At the real world, Koichi comes with a plan to save both Sarah and the GBN, and asks for Tsukasa's help with it.
22	"Devoted Heart"; Transliteration: "Chikau Kokoro" (Japanese: 誓う心)	September 4, 2018
The Build Divers have a plan to transfer Sarah's data to the real world while ensuring the safety of GBN, but it has a low chance of success and thus Kyoya and the rest of the Second Coalition refuse to cooperate. Kyoya asking Sarah what she wants and shocked at her choice silently and nearly crying leaves the room she is being kept in, hiding a tragic truth from her. To settle the impasse, the Build Divers and their allies accept to have a battle with the Coalition to decide Sarah and the GBN's fate.
23	"The Fateful Two"; Transliteration: "Shukumei no Futari" (Japanese: 宿命の二人)	September 11, 2018
The decisive battle between Build Divers and the Second Coalition of Volunteers begins, while Riku and Momo attempt to sneak by the enemy's defenses to reach Sarah, the others confront the enemy forces. In the occasion, Tigerwolf and Shahryar face off in combat, and after the victor is decided, they agree to help the Build Divers together, but they are easily defeated by Kyoya, who challenges Riku for a duel.
24	"Decisive Battle"; Transliteration: "Kessen" (Japanese: 決戦)	September 18, 2018
The Build Divers are almost losing the battle against the Coalition when Ogre and his force appear to help them. Riku and Ogre then join forces to confront Kyoya and rescue Sarah. Breaking past Kyoya, with Ogre's help Riku is about to claim Sarah as she is rushing to him crying out, but then a large cloud of dust blows over the damaged 00 Sky, which becomes falling light and as Riku ejects and catches Sarah claiming rightful victory, the GM gives them their victory, thinking the light is their light of posiblity that can eluminate the future, a pun from MS Gundam 00! However that was no such light, and as Riku's company head to a capital to use the Build Decal program to save Sarah, something is in their way!
25	"A New World"; Transliteration: "Atarashī Sekai" (Japanese: 新しい世界)	September 25, 2018
The Build Divers are about to transfer Sarah to the real world when the GBN system goes haywire, creating massive enemies that threaten the entire system. The Coalition and the GBN administrators then join forces with Build Divers and their friends to defeat them. After the battle, Sarah is at last sent to a Gunpla-like body in the real world, where she enjoys her new life with Riku and his friends. But true victory does not come without sacrifice, and their happy ending came at a price......which they have yet to find out and will have to rebuild.

=== Manga ===
A sidestory Manga titled Gundam Build Divers Break (Japanese: ガンダムビルドダイバーズ ブレイク, Hepburn: Gandamu Birudo Daibāzu Bureiku) began serialization in Kadokawa Shoten's monthly Gundam Ace Magazine in June 2018 to October 2019. The Manga was illustrated by Shiitake Gensui (Go to Helln) and written by Ryōji Sekinishi with mecha designs from Takayuki Yanase.

=== Video games ===
One of the series's Mobile Suits, Gundam AGE II Magnum appeared in the 2018 PlayStation 4 game New Gundam Breaker.

=== Merchandise ===
Part of the series's merchandise was released under Bandai Spirits' long running Gunpla line of scale models and sub-collectible line such as Robot Spirits figures.

== See also ==
- Plamo-Kyoshiro
- Model Suit Gunpla Builders Beginning G
- Gundam Build Fighters
- Accel World
- Little Battlers Experience

Preceded by Gundam Build Fighters: GM's Counterattack	Gundam metaseries (production order); 2018	Succeeded by Mobile Suit Gundam Narrative
