= Poly-cap =

A poly-cap (or poly cap) is a small rubber polyethylene bushing used to create smooth joints, or to keep something in place without glue in scale-models. In model kit descriptions, they are sometimes referred to under the material acronym PE. They are usually found on kits such as those by Tamiya and Bandai who have employed them for a long time.

Although regarded as a quick and reliable solution to create stiff joints to hold poses, they have shown to deteriorate in strength if too much friction is applied from shifting poses, as well as a loss in grip strength over the course of a few years without tampering, causing the final build to be unable to hold more complex poses over time. As such, manufactures such as Bandai have shown signs of abandonment in more recent releases of the part in favor of more solid, peg reliant engineering, and using harder plastics to keep poses held, although the material is still used in re-releases of old kits.

A typical "cap" is a small cylinder, but many other shapes exist. Bandai for example have a wide range of designs used in their mecha model kits (Gunpla, etc.).

Typical uses include

- Wheel or sprocket-hubs
- Pivot-points for guns
- Joints in robotic limbs
