= Gunpla =

Model kits of the Gundam franchise

Gunpla ガンプラ
- Type: Scaled model kits
- Invented by: Yoshiyuki Tomino
- Company: Bandai (1980–2017); Bandai Spirits (2017–present)
- Country: Japan
- Availability: 1980–present
- Materials: Plastic
- Official website

Gundam Plastic models, Gundam Plamo, or Gunpla (ガンプラ, Ganpura) are model kits depicting the mecha machinery and characters of the fictional Gundam multiverse by Bandai Spirits.

These kits became popular among mecha anime fans and model enthusiasts in Japan and nearby Asian countries beginning in the 1980s. Gundam modeling spread in the 1990s with North America and Europe being exposed to Gundam through anime and manga. They are extremely popular in Japan and other Asian countries but are gaining traction in the Western world.

The name Gunpla derives from an abbreviation of "Gundam plamo" phrase, 'plamo' itself being a portmanteau of plastic and model, since most kits are made of plastic.

Bandai sold over 100 million Gundam plastic model units between 1980 and 1984, and over 300 million units by May 1999. Recently, Bandai had sold an estimated 450 million units worldwide across nearly 2,000 different Gundam models. As of March 2021, Bandai Namco has sold 714.84 million Gundam plastic model units, including 538.24 million standard Gundam units (since 1980) and 176.6 million SD Gundam units (since 1987). By September 2024, cumulative worldwide shipments surpassed 800 million units.

== History ==
Late 1970s–1980s

Gundam models are based on the Mobile Suit Gundam franchise, which debuted in 1979 as a television show.

In 1980, Bandai obtained the rights to produce models based on the Gundam franchise. While Clover's models were produced in the style of most children's toys – fully assembled and ready for play – Bandai designed theirs as plastic kits to be assembled, similar to military vehicle models. While Clover's products targeted children, Bandai's approach was more appealing to the teenage and adult consumers that were more typical of Mobile Suit Gundam's audience, and was received extremely well.

Nearly every mecha in the series was made into a model kit, from mobile suits to support aircraft and space battleships. Parts came in up to three different cast-in colors. These early kits are distinguished by their lack of articulation and low detail and, unlike later generations, require glue to assemble.

A later development was System Injection, a technique which permitted a single "part" to be cast in multiple colors of plastic simultaneously, minimizing the need to paint the finished model.

Mid 1980s–1990s

In 1985, Bandai introduced use of poly-caps (soft plastic, typically Polyethylene) as connectors for better articulation of joints.

The 1987 model line for Gundam Sentinel introduced snap-fit models, which needed little or no glue to assemble. This would become standard in 1988, after which all kits use snap-fit assembly and no glue is needed.

In 1990, Bandai introduced the High Grade (HG) line, which began an ongoing process of increasing model quality, and the creation of a grade system to describe the detail and quality of each kit. HG kits had much higher detail and articulation, as well as features normally found in larger-scale models, despite being 1:144 scale. One example is the 'Gundam Core Block System', in which the pilot sits in a "Core" which can be removed from the Gundam to become a distinct vehicle, and the Zeta Gundam's transformation feature.

In 1993, a unified set of poly-cap joints was created for smaller scale models that allowed easy mass production of models that all shared the same basic skeletal frame. This standardization allowed Bandai to release more models over a shorter period. As a result, the Gundam shows of the 1990s usually received sizable 1:144 model lines.

In 1995, the 1:100 scale Master Grade (MG) line was introduced. This line featured more parts, better detail and improved articulation than past kits of the same scale.

In 1998, Bandai introduced the 1:60 Perfect Grade (PG) line. This line features extensive detail and articulation, light-up features, and a "body on frame" skeletal system in which the exterior panels of the model are separate components attached to a completely functional, articulated internal frame. This design element would later appear (sometimes in a limited form) in lower-grade models. The PG line is typically the most expensive among all Gunpla kits, and only a select few mobile suits have been released in this line.

In 1999, to celebrate the 20th anniversary of the franchise, Bandai released 1:144 First Grade (FG) kits of mobile suits from the original series. Marketed as budget models, these snap-fit kits featured the simplicity of the original kits, but with more modern designs based upon the corresponding Perfect Grade kits.

2000s

For the Mobile Suit Gundam SEED models a new type of non-graded (NG) 1:144 model was introduced, with a completely different design plan. While these still feature snap-fit and color molding, they omit major joints, opting instead to only allow critical pieces to move—typically the neck, hips, shoulders, and feet. These are budget models, usually retailing much lower than other models; and this line was extensive, covering nearly every machine to be featured in that TV series.

Gundam SEED also featured non graded 1:100 models, identical in quality to Bandai's High Grade offerings.

It was also during this decade that the term "Gunpla" was coined by Bandai.

2010s

In 2010, Bandai released the 1:48 Mega Size Model RX-78-2 Gundam kit as part of the franchise's 30th anniversary campaign. This kit features many innovations that make it easy to assemble for first-time Gunpla collectors. For example, the parts are attached to sprue gates thin enough to break without the need to use of plastic cutters, and excess gate plastic can be removed from the parts without using a hobby knife. Some sprues have been designed to snap together for easy and quick removal of assembled parts.

In the same year, Bandai introduced the 1:144 Real Grade (RG) line, which takes design elements from the MG line such as an inner skeletal frame to improve upon the HG line.

Both Mega Size Model and RG variants of the RX-78-2 Gundam were patterned after the 1/1 scale Gundam statue on display in Odaiba. Bandai also released Ecopla, a series of High Grade Universal Century (HGUC) and super deformed (SD) kits molded in black and made entirely out of recycled sprues.

In 2011, Bandai released the Entry Grade (EG) line, a low-cost model series similar to the 1:144 NG and FG lines, sold only in parts of Asia. Unlike other kits of the same scale, the first line of EG kits were made in China and the series was initially discontinued until the line was rebooted in 2020 with kits from non-Gundam franchises.

Also in 2011, Bandai introduced the Advanced Grade (AG) line, a budget line that focuses more on the arrangement of colored parts, thus sacrificing more articulation than the previous budget lines. The AG line incorporates a microchip that enables collectors to use the kit in the Gage-ing arcade game.

In 2014, as part of the 35th anniversary celebration of Gundam, Bandai released the MG RX-78-2 Gundam ver. 3.0, which incorporates the engineering techniques used in the MG 2.0 and RG kits.

In 2015, Bandai introduced a sub-line of the HG called "HG Revive", which consists of re-engineered 1:144 scale kits of the RX-78-2 Gundam and other classic mobile suit designs.

From late 2016 onwards, every Bandai produced model kit, including Gunpla, were made with Japanese and English text on the box and manuals.

In 2017, Bandai began the Gundam Evolution Project, which sought to improve Gunpla technology with various groundbreaking kits, such as the adoption of a new joint system or a new LED system for large-scale kits. This was in preparation for the 40th anniversary of Gunpla in 2020.

== Assembly ==
Gundam model kits come in many varieties, but the majority made from the late 80s on – standard "plastic" kits – are manufactured and assembled similarly. Kits come as a collection of plastic parts, decals, and sometimes other decorative accessories which the purchaser assembles by hand into the finished model.

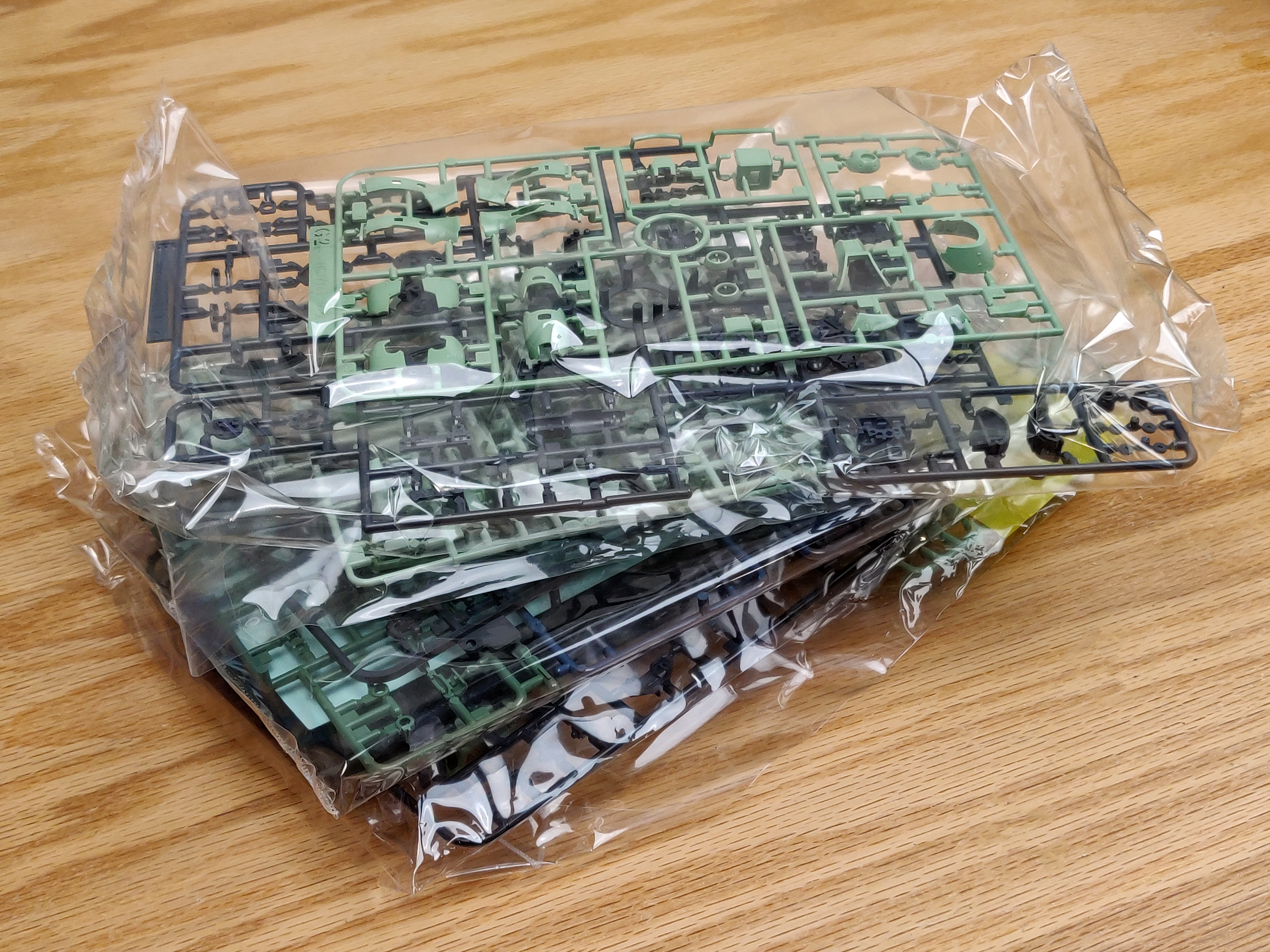
Gunpla model parts as shipped

The plastic parts are delivered in the exact form they exit the injection molding machine, on a "sprue tree" – a grid of interconnecting plastic rods, called runners, created by the channels in the mold that carried the molten plastic into the cavities that create each part. Each part is connected to the runners by a small plastic nub called a "gate" where the runner connected to the cavity.

The kit builder must cut away this excess plastic – e.g. with a pair of side cutting pliers – to free each part, then (optionally, but usually) clip, carve or sand away the remaining plastic tip where the gates attached to leave a clean surface.

Once the parts have been freed, the builder must then snap them together to assemble the model. Early kits required glue, but from the late 80s onward all kits assemble without special tools or materials.

Some kits use an internal frame – a complete "skeleton", fully articulated and able to stand on its own – to which panels are then attached to finish the appearance of the mecha. Some kits also have this internal frame fully pre-assembled on the runner- although this system has been largely phased out, as it can severely weaken over time, due to the degradation of the softer plastic used.

=== Customization ===
When it comes time to assemble the panels making up the external appearance of the model, the builder may choose to customize the model in a wide variety of ways. The most basic is simply to paint the model, which allows for a large amount of personal creativity. Applying decals is also a common technique – decals are included with most models, but are also available as separate products for customization.

Every conceivable modification is possible, with some more common options including:

- Panel lining: Many models have grooves where "panels" meet. Applying paint or ink with a fine tipped brush or pen can make these lines "pop"
- Panel line scribing: If the panel lines on a model are not as deep as the builder would like, they can use a knife to deepen them, or create new ones, using a ruler or custom stencil.
- Weathering: A variety of paint and plastic etching and carving techniques can make the model appear worn or battle-damaged, exposing simulated metal beneath the surface of an actual mobile suit's paint.
- Kitbashing: Kitbashes combine parts from multiple kits to create a unique new model. This technique has been used by employees at Hasbro to create prototypes of planned releases.
- Conversion kits: Conversion kits are (often) third-party products, usually made of thermoset resin, which can be attached (usually glued) to an official Bandai model to convert it into another model using the original as a base. Bandai used to release official conversion kits under their B-Club brand name.
- Custom parts: At the extreme end, a skilled builder can create additional parts completely from scratch to add detail to the model. these can be purely aesthetic, enhance the articulation of a model, or introduce new gimmicks to a kit.

All of these are optional, and the model can be assembled and displayed using nothing more than a side-cutter.

Most models, once assembled, are poseable to some degree. Many are "fully poseable", with a wide latitude of motion. To help hold models in "dynamic" poses, Gunpla can be mounted on a stand, with some recent models having a dedicated attachment point for this purpose.

Gunpla kit assembly

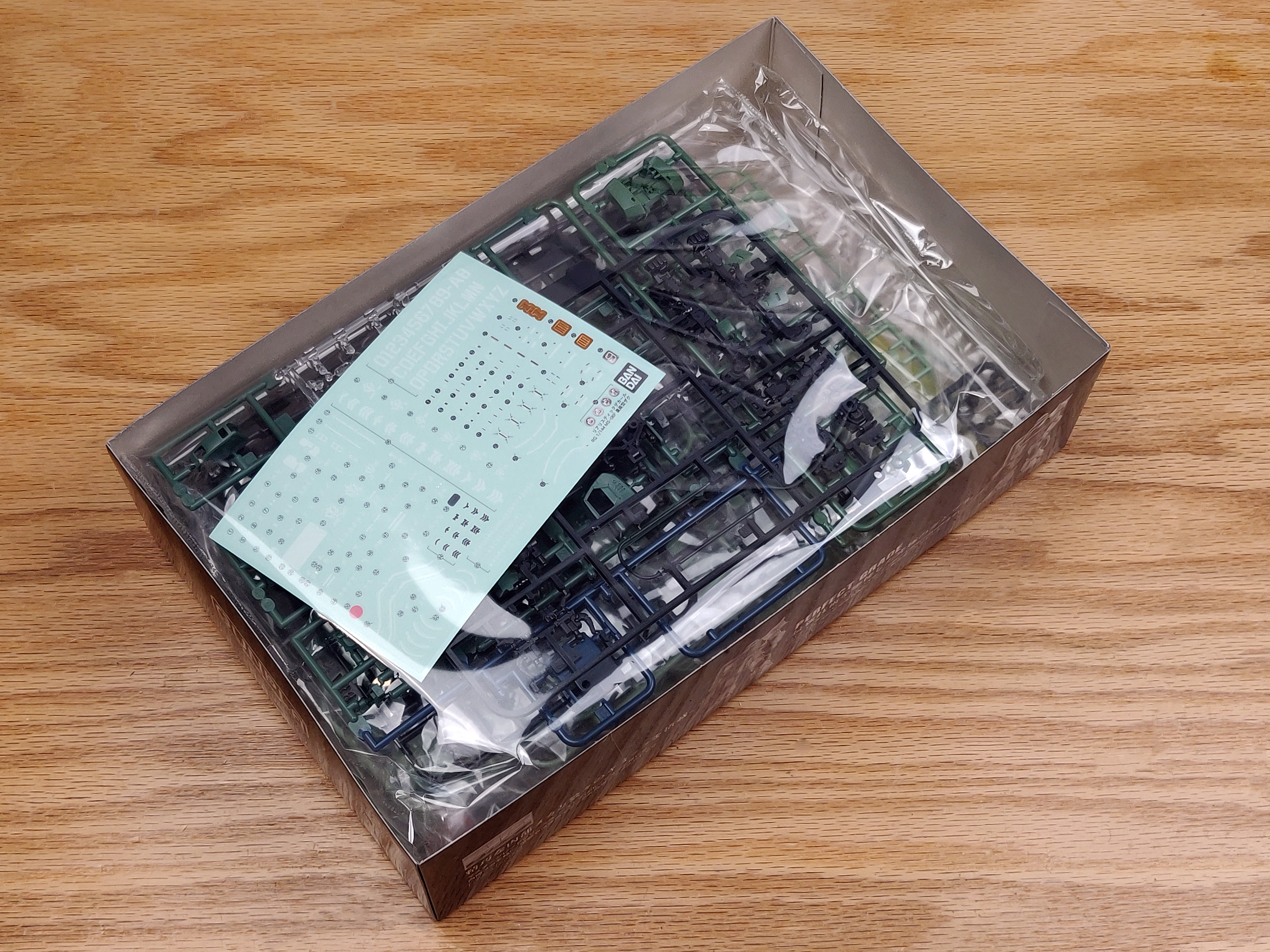
Gunpla model as purchased

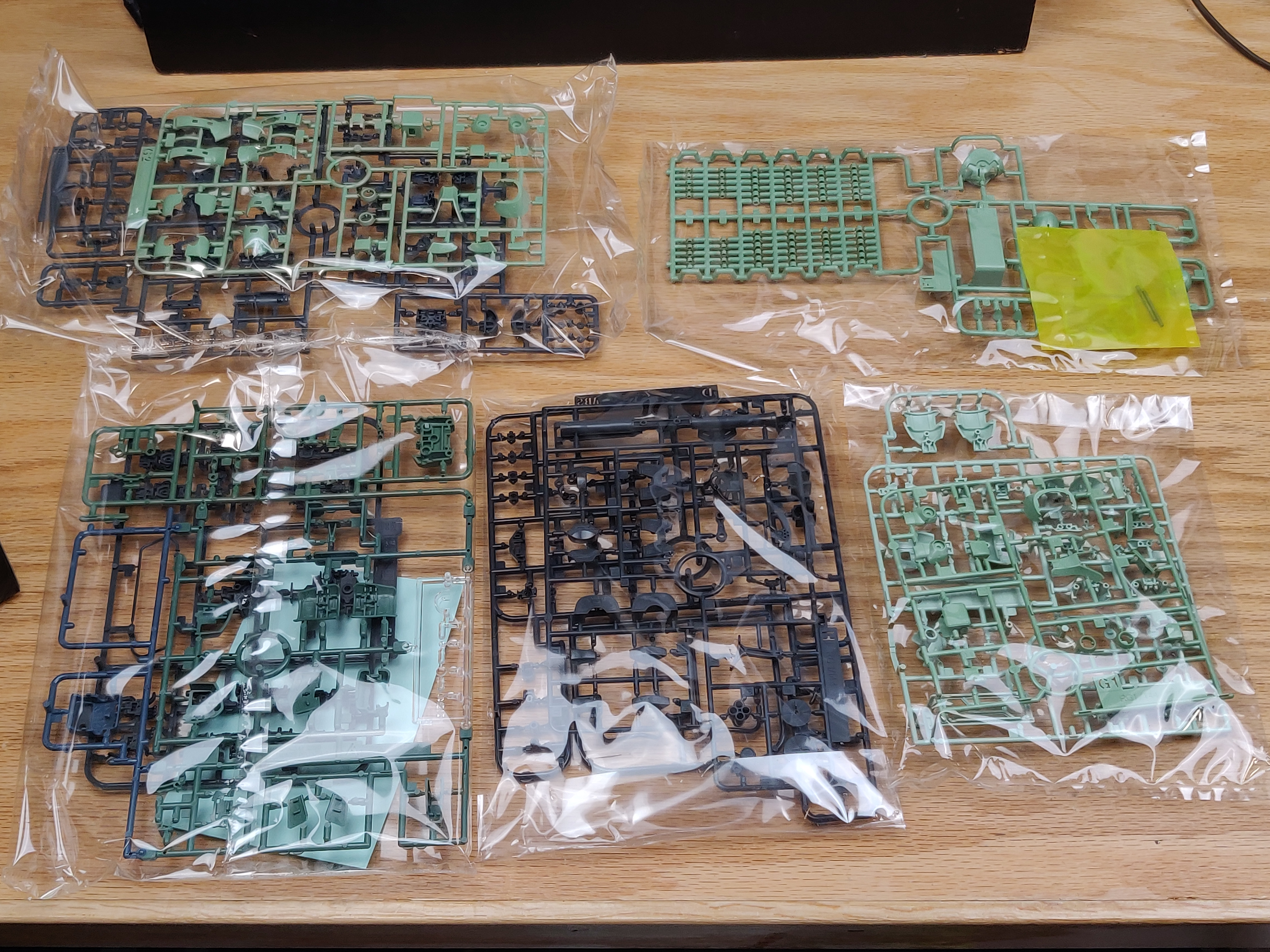
An entire Gunpla kit

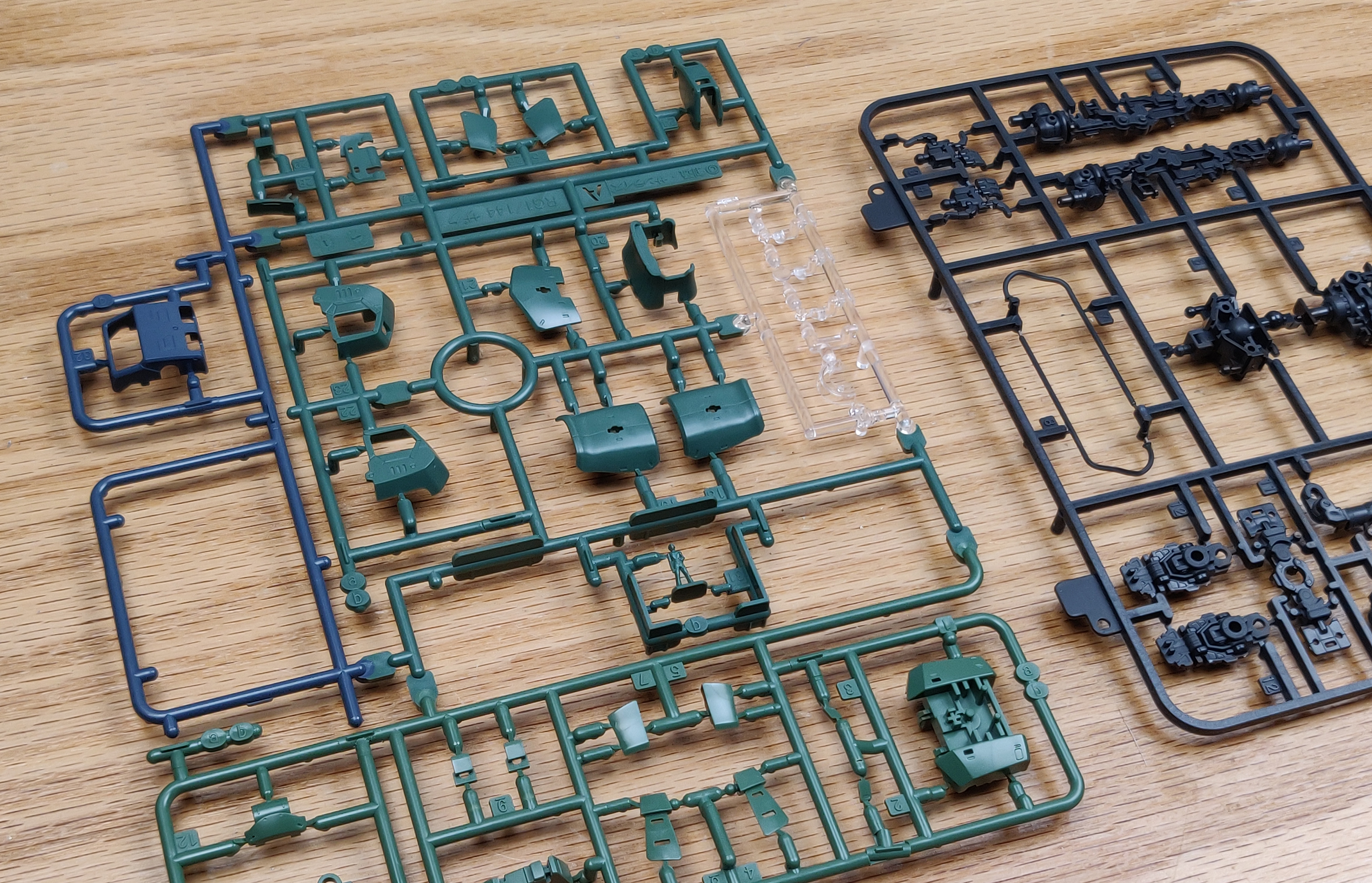
The left hand sprue includes parts molded in green, blue and transparent plastics

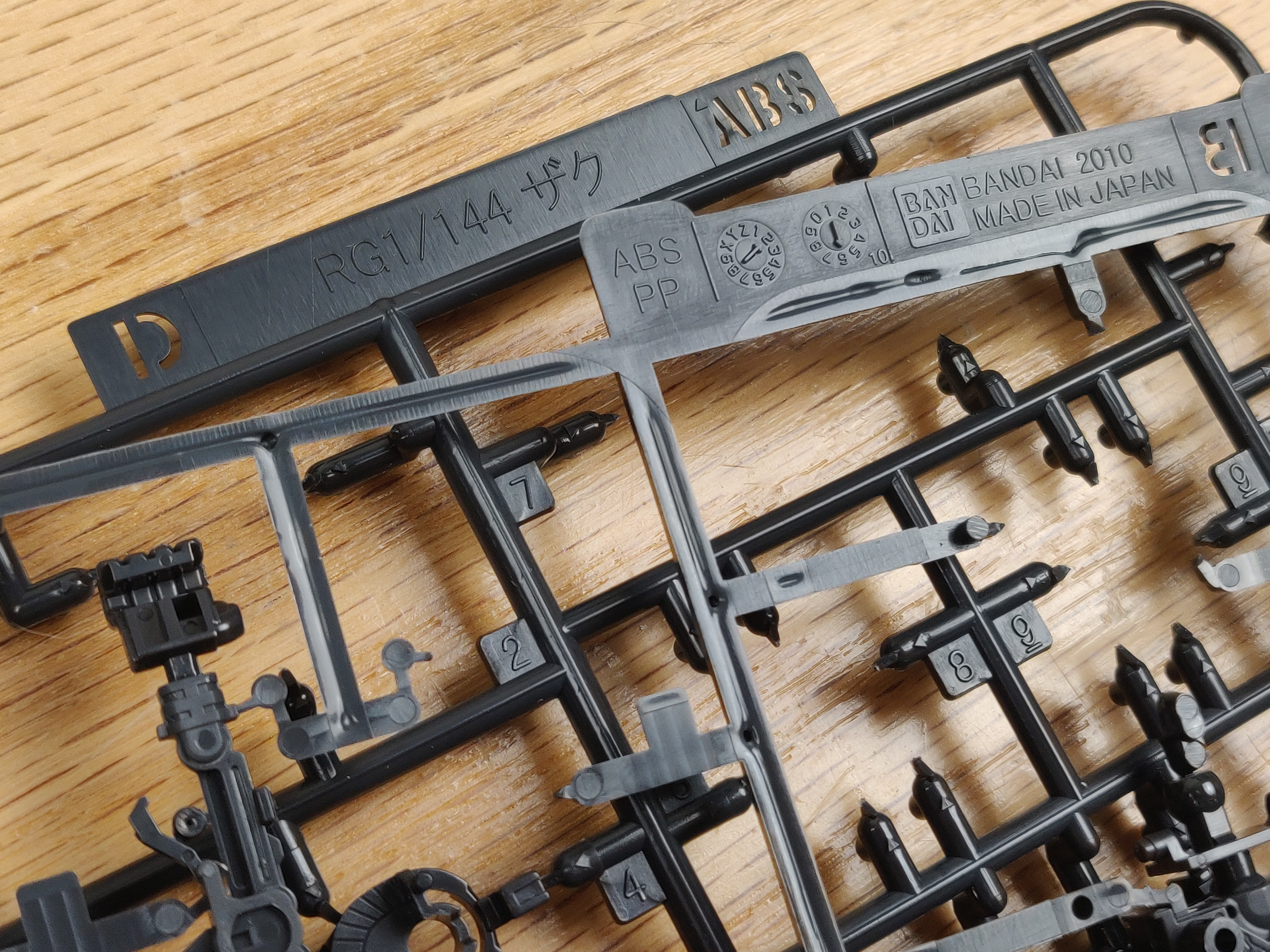
Gunpla are mostly polystyrene but some parts are ABS, or ABS/polypropylene blend

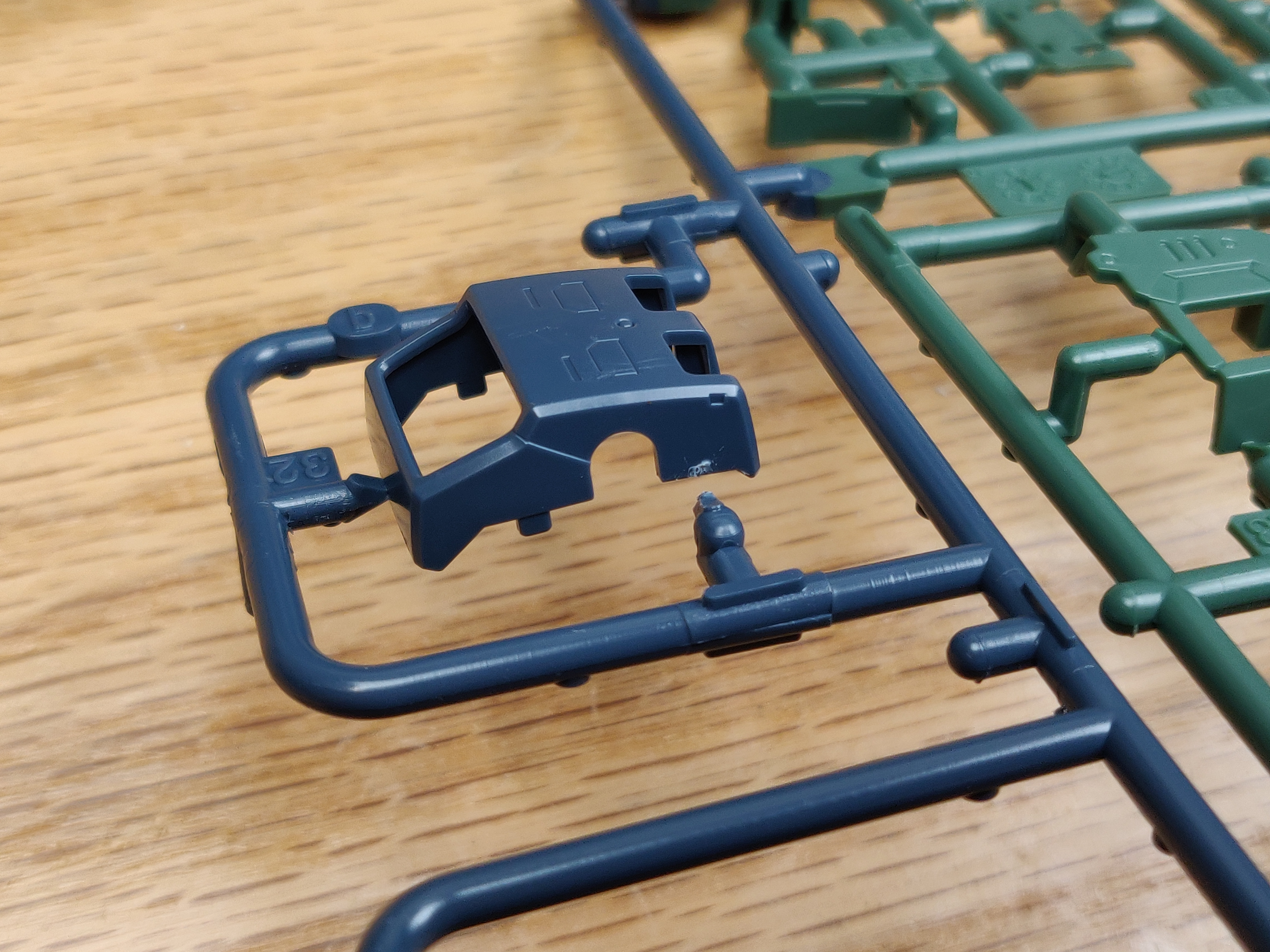
Parts have to be cut away from the sprue

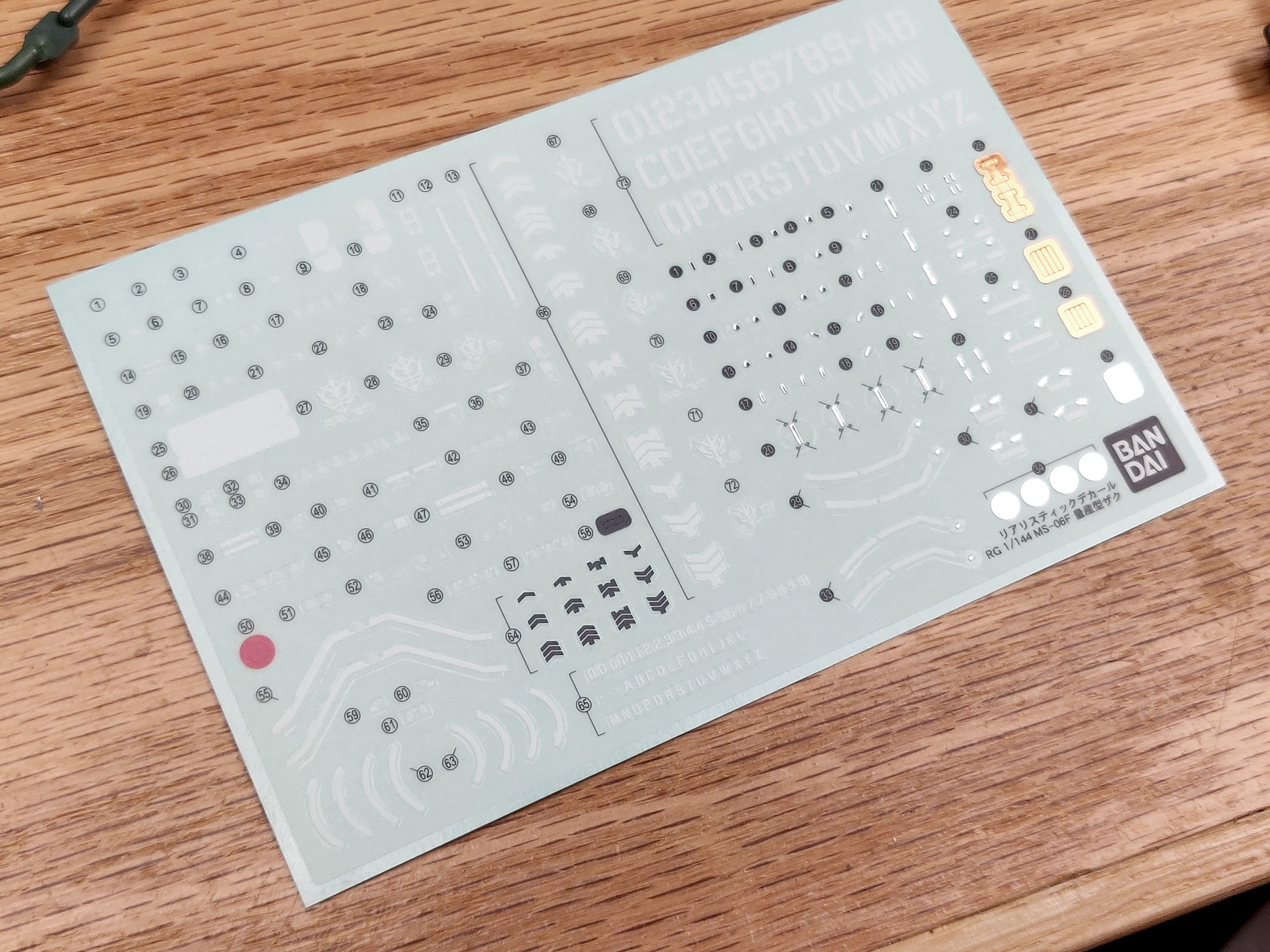
Decals are provided to give increased detail

== Design ==
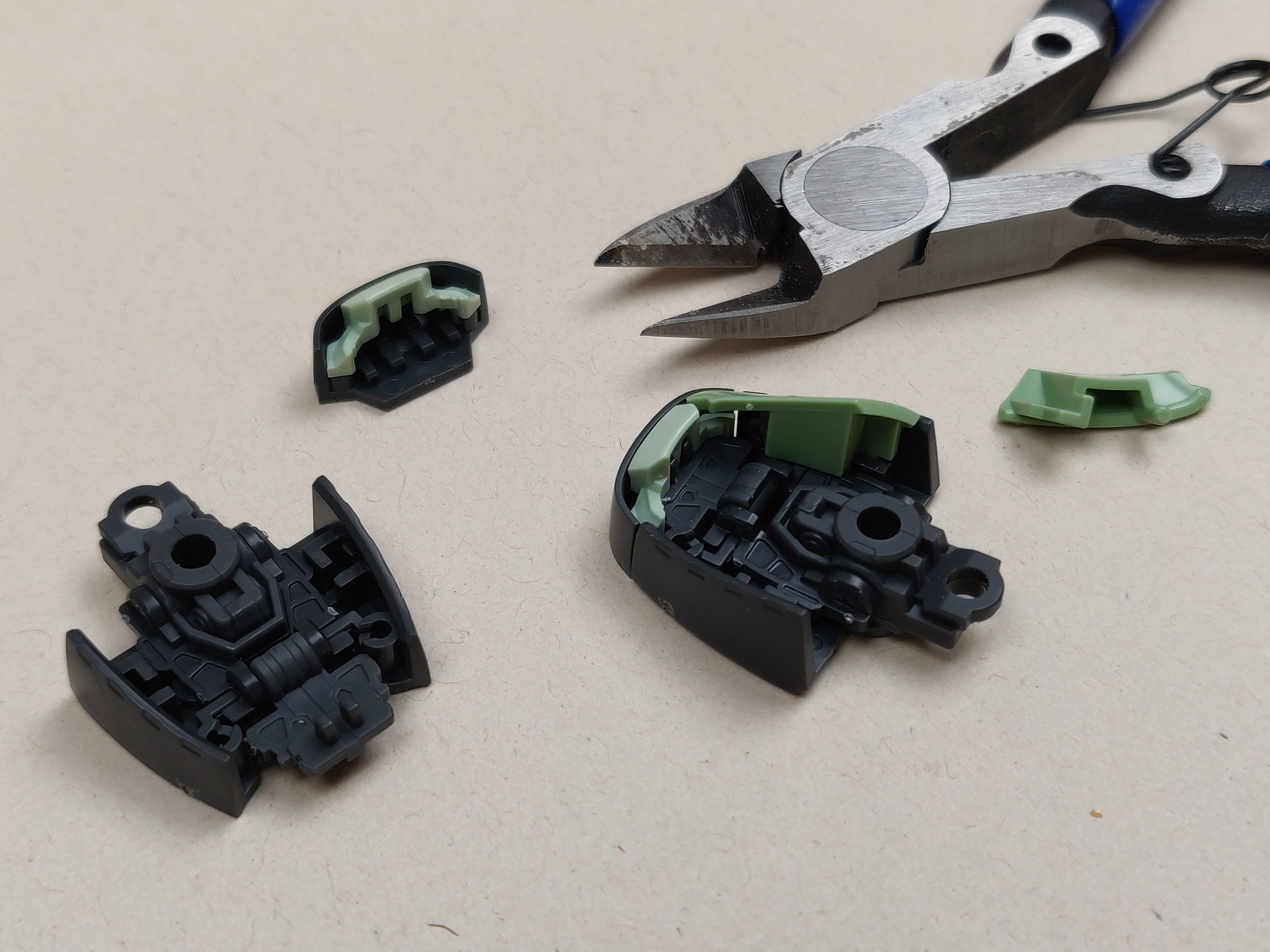
Several colored components fit together without glue to make a foot assembly

Over the decades, Gundam plastic models have been available in many forms, with many levels of intricacy and functionality, from immobile display units that are static once assembled, to fully poseable, highly articulated models with interchangeable parts (weapons, shields, etc.) and complex mechanical engineering.

All parts fit together with a variety of glueless, toolless joints, such as ball-and-socket pivots, or posts on one component that fit tightly into holes on another. While models are designed to be posed for display, these joints are not intended to hold up to action figure-style play; even during gentle pose adjustments, it is possible for parts to come loose and need to be pushed back together.

Components are made of plastic materials selected to fit the needs of each part. A given unit, like a foot or leg, may use parts made of multiple different materials. Bandai casts colored pigment into each part to provide a basic color scheme for the finished model, so the builder does not need to paint it if undesired.

The picture above illustrates the detail level of a higher end (Real Grade, 2011) model. This is one part of the model's "foot", less than an inch across, which not only has many details in a very small component, but is built around a very small doubly-articulated hinge. The fully assembled leg unit uses many more parts which allow it to bend at two major joints, and also has trim panels which slide apart as the leg is bent to allow the motion.

== Materials ==
Gundam model kits can be made of several materials.

=== Plastic ===
The typical mass-market kit is made from thermoplastics, such as ABS, polypropylene or polystyrene. These are referred to in the community simply as "plastic" models, and use the snap-fit assembly method described in this article.

Plastic Gundam model kits are manufactured in Japan or China by Bandai, which has an exclusive license in manufacturing and marketing them around the world.

=== Resin ===
A less common type, known as a garage kit or resin kit, is made from a thermoset resin, typically polyurethane, often simply referred to as "resin." These are not assembled with the snap-fit approach, and the builder must assemble them with glue. Many other assertions of this article will also not apply to resin kits, since they make up a very small minority of the product line.

Garage kits were originally made by amateur or small-scale manufacturers (hence the name,) a cottage industry that predates Gunpla, but Bandai has released some first-party Gundam resin kits under a separate marque, B-Club. These models are made of unpainted resin with no decals provided and often require touch-up work by the builder due to the inherent limitations of the manufacturing process.

While comparably more expensive (some surpassing $400) and more complex to assemble compared to plastic kits, they offer higher detail for the dedicated and experienced model builder.

=== Non-plastic ===
A few select kits have also been manufactured from metal. These kits are offered by several different manufacturers and most commonly will result in a finished model of about MG level. These types of models usually take days to build. Although not gunpla, there is a line of 'metal build' luxury gundam action figures that have a full metal inner frame.

== Scale ==
As with hobby models based on real-world military equipment, Gundam models are intended to be "scaled down" replicas of realistic designs, based on the dimensions given in the fiction. These scales are given in terms of the ratio of actual model size to the size the machine would have if it were actually built. 1:60, for instance, means that every inch of the models height is equivalent to 60 inches of the machines height if it was real.

Generally, finished model heights range from 4~5 inches for small-scale models (high grade, real grade, entry grade), 6~8 inches for mid-scale models (master grade, full mechanics, reborn one-hundred), and 12 inches for large-scale models (perfect grade). Common scales, and the grades typically associated with them, include:

Scales and Grades
Scale	Grade	Model height (RX-78) (Note: The RX-78-2 stands at 18 meters tall and has releases in every major Gunpla line, making it useful as a reference.)
1:550	N/A (used in various grades)	N/A
1:220	N/A (used in B-Club)	8.2 cm (3.2 in)
1:144	High Grade, Real Grade, Entry Grade	12.5 cm (5 in)
1:100	Master Grade, Master Grade Extreme, Full Mechanics, Reborn-One Hundred	18 cm (7 in)
1:60	Perfect Grade, Perfect Grade Unleashed	30 cm (11.8 in)
1:48	Mega Size Model	37.5 cm (14.75 in)
1:35	UC HardGraph	N/A

== Grades ==
Bandai uses a naming convention called grade to denote its scale and detail, with 4 main model lines and several spinoff lines. Each line evolves with improved modelmaking technology over time, so a High Grade kit released in the 2020s will trounce the 2000s releases. In addition, singular Mobile Suits will be released in multiple lines several times with new designs. For example, the RX-78-2 Gundam has releases in almost every model line, commemorating the anniversary of the series and to display new technology.

With minor exceptions such as plastic mold damage, Gunpla kits are almost never officially discontinued.

=== Original / No Grade / First Grade (FG) (various scales) ===
The original 1980 line of Gundam models does not have an associated grade, since this terminology was not introduced until 1990. These kits are limited in articulation, some require glue to assemble, and they must be painted for a correct appearance. Model Kits released to coincide with a show or movie usually that did not have a grade associated with them are generally referred to as No Grade kits. These were released in 1/144, 1/100, or 1/60 scale (some 1/100 models used the High Grade name on their boxes).

After the adoption of the grade nomenclature, Bandai rereleased the designs of the RX-78-2 and Zaku II with minimal updates as First Grade (FG) starting in 1999. Four mobile suits from Gundam 00 were also given First Grade Models, with limited color separation.

Reissues of the original 1980 line are sometimes referred to as the Best Mecha Collection (BMC). For the 45th Anniversary of Gundam in 2024, a modern remake of the original RX-78-2 kit was released in October, called the BMC Revival version, which now features modern Gunpla techniques such as color separation and snap-fit parts while retaining its limited articulation.

=== High Grade / HG (1/144) ===
HG models were introduced in 1990. The original kits featured full snap-fit assembly, an articulated internal frame (for the first two kits, which provides better range of motion and is more poseable), and utilized the molding technique known as System Injection, wherein multiple colors would be cast on the same part. In 1999, the High Grade Universal Century Line was introduced, which collected mobile suits from the Universal Century Timeline. In 2010, the line was expanded to include mobile suits from Future Century, After Colony, After War, Correct Century, and Cosmic Era, and Gundam series that did not fit in those timeline (Like Gundam AGE or Iron Blooded Orphans) received their own HG lines.

In 2015, HG Revive, a subline within the HGUC line was introduced, which gave older HGUC kits redesigns that adhered to modern HG standards in terms of detail and articulation. The High Grade line is not exclusive to Gundam, as other mecha series, such as Mazinger, Kyoukai Senki, and Evangelion receiving HG kits of their own. HG Amplified IMGN was a subline introduced in 2022, which redesigned smaller robots (namely those from the Wataru series) with more humanoid proportions. A vast majority of HGs use polycaps, but Bandai has started to abandon the technology with the release of Witch From Mercury and Gundam SEED Freedom kits for better stability.

=== Real Grade / RG (1/144) ===
In 2010, Real Grade (RG) was released to celebrate the 30th anniversary of Gunpla. Real Grade kits are differentiated from HG kits by a number of features previously found only in larger scale kits, including near perfect color accuracy without the use of color-correcting stickers, a full inner frame, high part counts, advanced articulation, and extensive decals. These kits have also been redesigned to appear more "realistic" by adding additional surface detail, color separation and mechanical detail. Most RG kits use a technology called the Advanced MS Joint, where the inner frame for the chest, arms, legs, and feet are prebuilt and fully articulated, requiring the other parts to be attached to it. The rubbery nature of the prebuilt parts leads to the model deteriorating in stability if too much weight is put on the prebuilt parts. Later RG kits use the more stable Advanced MS Framework that combines limited use of prebuilt parts alongside traditional inner frame technology, or use the MS Joints exclusively in lightweight areas such as accessories or weapons.

For the 45th Anniversary of Gundam in 2024, the RX-78-2 Gundam Ver.2.0 was announced for August 2024, with a focus on realistic inner frame detailing and high articulation. It is also the first kit to abandon the MS Joint technology altogether.

The Real Grade line has also hosted mechas from Neon Genesis Evangelion and The King of Braves Gaogaigar. These do not use MS joints and emphasize other aspects of their design (The Evangelions use a universal inner frame and high color separation and the Gaogaigar features a complex combining design)

=== Master Grade / MG (1/100) ===
MG models were first introduced in the Summer of 1995, designed and made to higher standards than most other models. These kits take longer to construct and are often more expensive than their lower-grade counterparts. More recent Master Grade plastic models typically feature a movable inner frame system which enables extensive movement and bending of joints, as well as including standing and seating miniature figures of the pilots of each Gundam model.

Beginning in 2005 with the Zeta Gundam and Gundam Mk-II, Older MG Kits would be redesigned under the Ver.2.0 moniker with features such as improved articulation and a full inner frame. The RX-78-2 Gundam has had multiple MG iterations, including a Ver.1.5 that uses a mix of old and new parts, a Ver.2.0 that is more faithful to the original anime, a Ver.3.0 that is modeled after the life size statue similar to the Real Grade version, a version based on its appearance in Gundam The Origin, as well as a Ver.Ka and Ver.OYW (One Year War) version released to coincide with the video game of the same name.

The Master Grade line is not Gundam exclusive as a few Master Grade offerings have come from mechas in Patlabor and Dunbine. Bandai also released a line featuring a series of character figures from Dragon Ball Z, Kamen Rider, and Tiger & Bunny under the name of MG Figure-rise.

==== Ver. Ka ====
In 2002, a new line of Master Grade kits subtitled "Ver. Ka" was released, which are Master Grades (re)designed by mecha designer Hajime Katoki. Mobile suits chosen to become Ver. Ka kits are chosen by annual fan votes. Ver. Ka kits are known for their highly realistic and complex gimmicks and designs, as well as an abundance of decals.

==== Extreme ====
In 2020 a new line, Master Grade Extreme (abbreviated as MGEX), released as luxury-grade redesigns of Master Grades that contained additional gimmicks, called "Extreme Points", that exaggerate and amplify key appeals of the featured mobile suit. The first model kit of this line, the Unicorn Gundam Ver. Ka, contained an LED light strip that ran across the mobile suit, changing colors between the normal Unicorn and Destroy Mode. The second, Strike Freedom Gundam, released in November 2022 and uses metallic coated and plated parts for the inner frame, as well as the highest amount of joint part interactivity.

=== Perfect Grade / PG (1/60) ===
PG is the highest grade line of Bandai kits. The first PG Gunpla kit was a RX 78-2 Gundam model released in 1998, but an Evangelion Unit-01 kit labeled as Perfect Grade released the year prior. Only 19 kits have been released as 1/60 Perfect Grade since then. A Perfect Grade Millennium Falcon kit released in 2017 and was 1/72 scale instead of 1/60 scale. The first PG Unleashed kit was a RX 78-2 Gundam model released in December 2020.

As the name suggests, Perfect Grade Gunpla kits attempt to represent the Gundam as perfectly as possible within real world and design limitations. These limitations result in the Perfect Grade line sometimes taking several years between releases to wait for advances in model making technology. Perfect Grade Unleashed is an updated version of Perfect Grade that uses more advanced technology and concepts, such as the return of Advanced MS Joints, the use of LEDs, hard plastic stickers and metallic etched parts, multiple points of articulation in the same limb, and the Evolution Link System, where the construction is separated into multiple phases (starts with the bare inner frame, then the extra detail within the frame with metallic parts, then the armor attached to the frame) to simulate building a real mecha, with the final phase displaying the detail of the inner frame using multiple hatches.

Features like metal joints, increased detail in plastic molding and plastic quality, opening hatch gimmicks, as well as LED lighting kits are signatures of the PG line.

=== Other lines ===
==== Super Deformed / SD ====
Not based on any particular scale, the super-deformed style features comically proportioned models, the most noticeable features of which are their very large heads. Super Deformed Gundam kits are often very easy to construct and contain original gimmicks but offer very limited articulation and require paint and detailing.

The most famous line is BB Senshi (BB Warriors in English), which ran from 1987 to 2018. Various other SD gundam lines have run alongside and replaced it, including:

- SD G Generation (1999–2002), based on the game series of the same name. Early SDGG kits were rereleases of old SDBB kits with new parts.
- SD EX-Standard (2015–2017, 2020-), which feature simplistic assembly and contain a gimmick where weapons can be combined and used with most HG kits.
- SD Cross Silhouette (2018–2020, 2023-), which uses a simple inner frame for better articulation and contains mecha from Mazinger and Gaogaigar.
- SD Gundam Force, SD Gundam Sangokuden Brave Battle Warriors, SD Gundam World Sangoku Soketsuden and SD Gundam World Heroes (2004, 2010–2011, 2019–2020, 2021-), based on their corresponding series.
- Master Grade SD (2023-), a line that is similar to a Master Grade in terms of detail and articulation, while still keeping the Super Deformed designs.

==== Entry Grade (EG) ====
In 2011, Bandai released the Entry Grade (EG) line in Southeast Asia. Originally manufactured in China, the EG line contained fewer parts than the FG kits, thus having very limited articulation. Only four Gundams were released in the line. Bandai later rebooted the Entry Grade line in 2020 to be released worldwide. While most releases were static figurines from other franchises, the RX-78-2 Gundam was the starting Gundam model, with the kit having articulation and proportions similar to the High Grade kits and advanced color separated parts without the need of stickers or tools (for example, the silhouette in the eye that would normally be a sticker is done through shadow).

==== Gunpla-Kun ====
A smaller line beginning in 2023 as part of the Fun to Build GUNPLA campaign. The models can be assembled as a figure or on a faux runner for display. Gunpla-kun demonstrated the use of Limestone-based LIMEX plastic while the event-exclusive Zakupla-kun used plastic made from green tea leaves. The latter was released later using standard plastic in 2025.

==== 1/100 Full Mechanics ====
A 1/100 scale model line focusing on replicating surface detail and complex "gimmick points" without the use of an inner frame like Master Grades. The line debuted in 2016 to coincide with the second season of Iron-Blooded Orphans before relaunching in 2021 with suits from Mobile Suit Gundam SEED and The Witch From Mercury.

==== Figure Rise Standard ====
A line of character figure model kits primarily focused on various anime, manga, and tokusatsu hero franchises like Dragon Ball, Ultraman, and Kamen Rider. The line also features characters owned by Bandai Namco, including human characters from the Gundam franchise.

==== Option Parts Set ====
A 1/144 scale accessory line consisting primarily of rereleases of older accessories under a new label, with new releases being designed to attach to most modern 1/144 scale kits.

==== Minipla ====
Bandai's Shokugan division of candy toys releases Minipla models for combining mecha in the Super Sentai series. Each part of the mecha is sold in an individual box, or a full set can be purchased by individuals and vendors. Super Minipla (later renamed Shokugan Modeling Project and abbreviated as SMP) is a line containing higher-quality redesigns of older Super Sentai Models as well as combining mecha from other series.

==== Action Bases ====
A line of display bases that allow a Gundam model to be displayed in mid-air poses. 8 variations of the Action Base, meant for 1/144 scale, 1/100 scale, and SD kits have been released since 2006, and some models will have an action base included, although it is uncommon. With the exception of weight considerations, there is no strict rule as to what base can be used as long as it fits within the included adapter or x-millimeter peg on the bottom of most models.

=== Inactive Model Lines ===
Mega Size Model was a line released in 2010 to commemorate the franchises' 30th anniversary. The line was released in 1/48 scale, 3 times the size of their High Grade counterparts, and included simplified building techniques such as a parts separator and joint parts that can be connected without removing them from the runner. They also come with water decals and guides on customizing finished models. 5 suits were released throughout 2010 and 2011, with a Unicorn Gundam model being released in 2017.

Iropla was released in 1983 as a budget line. 4 kits were released in 1/250 scale and it was the first to use multi-colored runners for better color separation.

Haropla is a line of model kits based on Haro, a robot helper that appears in various Gundam timelines.

Speed Grade uses a scale of 1:200 and has parts prepainted on the runners.

Advanced Grade, released to coincide with Gundam AGE, had limited articulation (restricted to the head and shoulders) and came with microchips and trading cards for use with a Gundam AGE arcade game.

Gundam Collection is a line of 1/400 scale battleships and mobile armors released between 2003 and 2007 alongside a blind box figure line, utilizing painted parts instead of color molding.

High Grade Mechanics was a 1/550 scale line depicting 3 mobile armors from Gundam 0083: Stardust Memory.

EX Model is a line depicting support units in 1/144 and 1/100 scale and battleships in 1/1700 scale. These are similar to traditional vehicle models, requiring paint and glue for a complete appearance. This series is not Gundam-exclusive, having models from other series including Sentō Yōsei Yukikaze, Patlabor, and Batman.

HI-Resolution Models (HiRM) are 1/100 scale and, in addition to redesigning the mobile suit, included a pre-built inner frame similar to an action figure, often using die-cast metal parts. HiRM is not fully discontinued, but there has not been a release in 3 years.

Hyper Hybrid Models (HY2Ms) include 1/100 scale Gundam heads modified to incorporate LED units or 1/60 scale models that have LED units across the body and require knowledge on electronics to make.

Reborn 1/100 kits are 1/100 scale and cover more obscure mobile suits and those that would be too large to make into a standard MG model. As such, these kits are less complicated than a typical MG kit.

Universal Century HardGraph (UCHG) was a 1/35 scale line focusing on military vehicles and dioramas that would be seen during the One Year War. Some releases include to-scale mecha parts, such as a Zaku head or a severed GM arm. The High Grade UC Hardgraph subline features 1/144 scale mobile suits and vehicle models.

=== 30 Minutes Label ===
A non-Gundam line that began in 2019, the 30 Minutes Label focuses on easy-to-build, highly customizable model kits. The line gets its name from its assembly system that enables modelers to complete the kit in as fast as 30 minutes. In addition to simplified joint structure allowing for the combination of multiple kits, the armor includes various 3mm holes to allow the use of multiple different weapon and armor sets. The 30 Minutes Label consists of four lines:

- 30 Minutes Missions (30MM) (2019): focusing on original mecha called ExAMACS, as well as mecha from Armored Core VI: Fires of Rubicon
- 30 Minutes Sisters (30MS) (2021): focusing on customizable mecha girls, as well as characters from Umamusume: Pretty Derby, The Idolmaster Shiny Colors, and Fate/Grand Order
- 30 Minutes Fantasy (30MF) (2024): focusing on medieval and knight-themed figures
- 30 Minutes Preference (30MP) (2025): focusing on characters from licensed anime not owned by Bandai, such as Bocchi the Rock! and Neon Genesis Evangelion

== Hobby ==
Gundam model building as a hobby is a worldwide phenomenon. Participation ranges from simply assembling kits as sold to mild personalization with paint and decals, to creating nearly original works with parts from multiple kits, additional custom-made components, and in-depth, detailed multi-layer paint jobs.

Like any hobby, Gunpla building can be extremely involved and expensive, but with model kits starting at less than US$20 and requiring no special tools or materials, barrier to entry is low.

Some hobbyists build dioramas around finished models using techniques shared with other miniature model-based hobbies such as model railroading and wargaming. A diorama could depict a mecha in combat, undergoing maintenance or even destroyed on the battlefield.

Bandai holds an annual international contest, Gunpla Builders World Cup, in at least 16 countries. Winners are awarded trophies and model kits.

== Model series ==
Gundam models are divided into series according to the media they are derived from.

Since 1999, the High Grade series uses various names to separate them from line to line.

- High Grade Universal Century (HGUC) refers to units that appear from Mobile Suit Gundam to Mobile Suit Victory Gundam and the series that are released in between. In 2010, this was expanded to include other series, under the lines:
  - High Grade After Colony (HGAC)
  - High Grade After War (HGAW)
  - High Grade Future Century (HGFC)
  - High Grade Correct Century (HGCC)
  - High Grade Cosmic Era (HGCE)
- Models from Mobile Suit Gundam SEED/Mobile Suit Gundam SEED Destiny, Mobile Suit Gundam 00, as well as from any Gundam series that released after 2010 released under these sublines:
  - High Grade Gundam SEED (HG Gundam SEED)
  - High Grade Gundam 00 (HG Gundam 00)
  - High Grade Gundam AGE (HG Gundam AGE)
  - High Grade Reconguista in G (HG Reconguista in G)
  - High Grade Gundam Thunderbolt (HGGT)
  - High Grade Gundam The Origin (HG The Origin or HGGTO)
  - High Grade Iron Blooded Orphans (HGIBO)
  - High Grade The Witch From Mercury (HGTWFM)
  - High Grade GQuuuuuuX (HGGQ)
- Four sub lines were also introduced to celebrate the release of Gundam Build Fighters, Gundam Build Fighters Try, Gundam Build Divers and Gundam Build Divers Re:Rise:
  - High Grade Build Fighters (HGBF)
  - High Grade Build Custom (HGBC)
  - High Grade Build Divers (HGBD)
  - High Grade Build Divers Re:RISE (HGBD:R)

== Gundam FIX Figuration ==
The Gundam FIX Figuration (aka G.F.F.) series of collectible figures was started based on the Gundam mechanical designs of Hajime Katoki and his 'Gundam FIX' illustration artbook and are released by Tamashii Nations, a Bandai's characters based toys line. Although they are similar to gunpla, they are not truly gunpla as they are not plastic model kits, they are pre-assembled figures. These figures share similar features as those found in the MSiA series, but are considerably more detailed and often include more accessories.

Changeable parts and variant models are often utilized throughout the line, offering the collector a wide variety of display abilities. The collectible figures use PVC (with some ABS plastic) for construction materials, and a recently introduced expansion to the line use metal in the skeleton of the figure. Gundam FIX figures are designed to be true to Hajime Katoki's vision, and as such often adopt design elements and styling found throughout his artwork. The Fix series caters to Gundam fans who enjoy the scale, possibility and durability of the MSiA line, but seek the extensive details and variations that can often only be found in the Master Grade Gundam model-kits.

The G.F.F. line does carry a higher price than the MSIA and MSIA Extended lines, which can represent a concern for some collectors. However, overall the G.F.F. represent a more "high-end" line of collectibles, which often contain better detail, more accessories, and the option to build multiple variations in the same box.

As the series has progressed, G.F.F. collectibles have been improved. Changes include sharper-more precise part casting resulting in better detail, improved articulation, and improved durability.

=== G.F.F.N. ===
The G.F.F.N. line up is a significantly better than the old G.F.F. series, though usually sporting a considerably higher price due to materials, production and shipping. The quality has improved thanks to a new durable plastic that is distinctively reminiscent to the Gundam Model plastic (HG, HGUC, MG, PG) thus replacing the resin that shrank while curing. There is also little, or no casting lines, professionally cast heads, and considerably less of the brittle gray-ish plastic that plagued the G.F.F. series. Rubber is now being used sparsely, often to be used for the hands to allow ease of swapping weapons or spare hands without breaking or warping the joint socket.

There are very few toys in the line-up, with some costing between $70–$150 or more (the price of a Perfect Grade, or large Master Grade.)

Bandai also created similar toy lines:

- G.F.F. Metal Composite – a spin-off of the G.F.F series utilizing injection-molded ABS plastic and die-cast metal.
- Zeonography – a spin-off of the G.F.F series that showcases mobile suits from the Zeon forces.
- Cosmic Region – high-quality line of mobile suits, similar to G.F.F., that appear in Mobile Suit Gundam SEED Destiny.
- 00 (Double O) Region – high-quality line of mobile suits, similar to G.F.F., that appear in Mobile Suit Gundam 00.
- G.F.F.N – Gundam Fix Figuration Next, '004X' Series utilizing metallic parts, slightly larger scale, better quality paint job and markings. The first figure is a re-release of the #0030 MSZ-008 Zeta II, released March 2009.
- K.F.F (Keroro Fix Figuration) – a spinoff lines features characters in Sgt. Frog (which the series itself plays much parody towards Gundam series) with original mechas designed by Hajime Katoki. As being a parody, the boxart sticks as much what as the original G.F.F. is.

== Special editions ==
Over the years, Bandai releases special limited editions of various kits, usually as competition (such as the yearly Bandai Action Kits Asia (now Universal) Cup held in Hong Kong) prizes, or as an event-limited (such as Japanese toy expos, movie launch premieres) item, as well as region-specific models (e.g. premium Bandai China limited cross contrast colour models), and special collaboration models with companies and celebrities such as 7-11, Uniqlo, hatsune Miku. although sometimes these kits are sold as limited web-shop items or discreetly sold by Bandai.

These kits usually come in clear plastic, metal-plated (certain kits are in so-called 24-k gold finish), "gloss-finish", "pearl-finish", "titanium-finish", or any combination of these. Their prices are usually much higher than their regular-release counterparts.

== Display-only models ==
For trade shows and toy fairs, Bandai displays some extremely large models in 1:6 or 1:12 scale. True to the scaling, some of these models are well over 5 feet (1.50 m) tall.

Although most of these are one off promotional models used for display purposes, Bandai has produced a few of these for commercial purposes under their HY2M line. Notably, these are MS-06S "Zaku II Commander Type" (Char Aznable custom), which is now out of production, and the RX-78-2 "Gundam". These generally retail for approximately $2,000 and are intended to be sold primarily to store owners as display fronts.

As part of the 30th Anniversary of the Gundam series, the company officially announced a project on March 11, 2009, called Real-G planning to build a 1:1 real size scale Gundam in Japan, it was completed on June 9, 2009, and displayed in a Tokyo park. The 18-meter tall statue was later moved and reconstructed in Shizuoka City, where it stayed from July 2010 to March 2011 when in August it was dismantled only to reopen in Odaiba, Tokyo on April 19, 2012. It stood in front of a gift shop, "Gundam Front Tokyo", until 2017 when it was replaced by the titular mobile suit of Mobile Suit Gundam Unicorn.

== Chinese copy controversy ==
In April 2010, Bandai sued two Chinese toy manufacturers for manufacturing and selling counterfeit Gunpla kits. The lawsuit states that Bandai demands 3.69 million RMB (roughly US$540,000) compensation from the companies.

Bootleg Gunpla companies include Daban, TT Hongli, Model GD, Elyn Hobby, Dragon Momoko, and more.

== In popular culture ==
Four Gundam media series titles focus primarily on Gunpla kits: Plamo-Kyoshiro (1982), Model Suit Gunpla Builders Beginning G (2010), and Gundam Build Fighters (2013) and its sequel Gundam Build Fighters Try (2014) and later the spiritual successor Gundam Build Divers (2018) as well as its sequel series, Gundam Build Divers Re:Rise (2019–2020).

In the manga/anime series Sgt. Frog, an addiction to Gundam models is the only thing stopping Keroro from invading Earth, since he reasons that if the Keronians invade Earth, all of the Gundam models will be destroyed, and there will be no one to make new ones. He loves the models so much, if any harm comes to them, he will react violently (such as going Super Saiyan). He is prepared for such events, though, since he keeps spare kits in the Hinata family's attic. Because the anime is made by Sunrise (the studio behind the Gundam anime), and because Bandai is the show's primary sponsor, the show is able to refer to Gundam models directly without legal issues.

In the manga/anime series Genshiken, Soichiro Tanaka teaches Kanako Ohno and Kanji Sasahara how to build Gundam models in Chapter 13 (adapted as episode 8 of the anime, where the pseudonym "Gungal" is used). Saki Kasukabe accidentally breaks Ohno's model and has to make it up to her by doing cosplay.

== See also ==
- Gundam
- Mobile Suit Gundam
- Gundam (fictional robot)
- Plastic model kits
