= Model Suit Gunpla Builders Beginning G =

Japanese OVA series

- Blu-ray release cover, featuring the GPB-X80 Beginning Gundam

模型戦士 ガンプラ ビルダーズ ビギニングG (Mokei Senshi Ganpura Birudāzu Biginingu Jī)
- Genre: Mecha, Science Fiction, Gunpla
- Manga

Model Suit Gunpla Builders A
- Written by: Yoshihiro Iwamoto
- Published by: ASCII Media Works
- Magazine: Kerokero Ace
- Original run: June 26, 2010 – February 26, 2011
- Volumes: 1
- Original video animation
- Directed by: Kou Matsuo
- Written by: Yōsuke Kuroda
- Music by: Sadayoshi Fujino
- Studio: Sunrise
- Licensed by: NA: Sunrise
- Released: August 15, 2010 – December 19, 2010
- Runtime: 15 minutes (41 minutes total in 3 episodes)
- Episodes: 3
- Manga

Model Suit Gunpla Builders Beginning D
- Published by: ASCII Media Works
- Magazine: Dengeki Hobby Magazine
- Original run: June 25, 2011 – May 25, 2012
- Volumes: 2
- Serial novel

Model Suit Gunpla Builders Beginning J
- Published by: ASCII Media Works
- Magazine: Dengeki Hobby Magazine
- Original run: May 25, 2011 – May 25, 2012
- Related
- Gundam Build Fighters (spin-off)
- icon

Model Suit Gunpla Builders Beginning G (模型戦士 ガンプラ ビルダーズ ビギニングG, Mokei Senshi Ganpura Birudāzu Biginingu Jī) is an anime produced by Sunrise to celebrate the 30th anniversary of the Gundam plastic model kits. It was directed by Kou Matsuo and written by Yousuke Kuroda, and features character designs by Kaichiro Terada. The show was originally broadcast on BS11 and streamed on the Internet from August 15, 2010, to December 19, 2010, with 3 15-minute episodes before being released on both DVD and Blu-ray on December 22, 2010. Unlike other Gundam titles, Gunpla Builders Beginning G takes place in a present-day timeline.

Aside from the anime, two manga sequels were released in Dengeki Hobby Magazine.

== Story ==
In the anime, Haru Irei goes to the merchandise section to choose a Gunpla kit while attending the 1/1 RX-78-2 Gundam display event in Odaiba's Shiokaze Park. When he fails to pick up the last available High Grade (HG) 1/144 RX-78-2 Gundam kit, he discovers the HG 1/144 GPB-X80 Beginning Gundam and makes it his own. With his newly assembled kit, Haru participates in Gunpla Battle, a virtual simulation game where players have their Gunpla models scanned and battle each other with them.

After his first encounter with the mysterious Boris Schauer and his HG 1/144 GPB-X38-30 Forever Gundam, Haru upgrades his Beginning Gundam before he and his friends Kenta Sakazaki and Rina Noyama enter the national Gunpla Battle tournament. The tournament ends with no clear winner, with Haru and Boris continuing to clash their beam sabers at each other. One year later, all of the main Gunpla kits of the series are on display at a hobby shop as Haru encourages younger kids to follow the same path he took.

=== Gunpla Battle ===
In the context of the anime, a Gunpla Battle is a game in which participants enter simulation cockpits that resemble the linear seats of later-Universal Century mobile suits. They place their Gunpla models in a scanning device that resembles a Haro unit. Oversized Haro units are also available to scan larger kits such as the 1/144 RX-78 GP03 Dendrobium. From there, they pilot their mobile suits in a simulated battlefield such as Tokyo or A Baoa Qu.

The mobile suit's statistics are relevant to the build quality of the Gunpla model. For example, a fully detailed Gunpla model with high quality paint and adhesive will perform better in a Gunpla Battle than one that is simply built straight out of the box. In addition, the scale of the Gunpla model is crucial in Gunpla Battle. For instance, a participant can pilot a Big Zam mobile armor, but if the Gunpla kit is 1/550 scale, then it is actually smaller in the battlefield than a 1/144 scale mobile suit.

== Characters ==
Haru Irei (イレイ・ハル, Irei Haru)
Voiced by: Tsubasa Yonaga
Main protagonist Haru Irei is a boy who becomes a "Gunpla Builder" after purchasing the "GPB-X80 Beginning Gundam" plastic model. His curiosity with the Gundam franchise leads him to participating in Gunpla Battle. In the Sound Drama included on the bonus CD a mysterious beautiful girl calls him "Beginning Haru" or its abbreviation "Biharu."In the manga version he has a hot-blooded personality and is inventive and creative. The path to becoming a Gunpla builder is the same as in the anime but he began building Gunpla before obtaining the Beginning and in his battle against Koji to obtain the Beginning, he uses a modified "GF13-017NJII God Gundam."

Kenta Sakazaki (サカザキ・ケンタ, Sakazaki Kenta)
Voiced by: Nobuhiko Okamoto
Kenta Sakazaki is Haru's friend who loves Gunpla and gives advice to Haru about building them. He also serves as Haru's wingman in Gunpla Battles.

Rina Noyama (ノヤマ・リナ, Noyama Rina)
Voiced by: Mariya Ise
Rina Noyama is a cheerful girl who is a big fan of Gunpla, yet seems to lack knowledge about the mobile suits they are based upon. She becomes Haru's second wingman in the final Gunpla Battle. She considers herself Haru's girlfriend, but Haru is not sure about this, and their relationship is a bit of a fizzle.

Boris Schauer (ボリス・シャウアー, Borisu Shauā)
Voiced by: Daisuke Namikawa
Boris Schauer is senior "Gunpla Meister" who challenges Haru with his GPB-X78-30 Forever Gundam. Sporting long, blond hair and wearing sunglasses, he resembles Quattro Bajeena.

Koji Matsumoto (コウジ・マツモト, Kōji Matsumoto)
Voiced by: Hiroshi Kamiya
Koji Matsumoto is a veteran Gunpla Builder and leader of the idol group SGOCK (スゴック, Sugokku) who challenges Haru to his first duel, with Haru's Beginning Gundam at stake.

Manager (店長, Tenchō)
Voiced by: Hiroki Takahashi
Matsumoto's manager builds his Gunpla for him.

Tatsu Shimano (タツ・シマノ, Tatsu Shimano)
Voiced by: Miyu Irino
Tatsu Shimano is a Gunpla Builder who is assigned to mentor Haru and Kenta in Gunpla Battle strategy. Much like Allelujah Haptism of Mobile Suit Gundam 00, he develops a somewhat sadistic alter ego during battle.

Hinode Irei (イレイ・ヒノデ, Irei Hinode)
Voiced by: Ken Narita
Hinode Irei is Haru's father who love Gundam and Gunpla during old days.

Urara Irei (イレイ・ウララ, Irei Urara)
Voiced by: Akiko Kimura
Urara Irei is Haru's mother and wife of Hinode Irei was working housewives.

Sam (サム, Samu)
Voiced by: Taketora
Sam is Boris' wingman in the final Gunpla Battle. He pilots an "RX-79BD-1 Blue Destiny Unit 1."

Diane Lee (ダイアン・リー, Daian Rī)
Voiced by: Aya Endō
Diane Lee is Boris' female wingman. She pilots an "MS-18E Kämpfer."

== Characters Side Story in Beginning D ==
Shingo Asume (アスメ・シンゴ, Asume Shingo)
Protagonist of the story. A high school student who steps into the world of Gunpla Battle after a chance meeting with Saki Mishima. He Pilot Gunpla "GPB-X80D Beginning D Gundam" from base original Beginning Gundam.

Saki Mishima (ミシマ・サキ, Mishima Saki)
A 19-year-old woman dressed in a flashy Gothic Lolita style. She is the mentor of Shingo and teaches him the basics of Gunpla building and battle.

== Characters Side Story in Beginning J ==
Takeru Nekki (ネッキ･タケル, Nekki Takeru)
Protagonist of the story. An enthusiastic junior high student with a deep passion for Gunpla. He is a highly skilled Gunpla modeler who uses production techniques passed down from his grandfather. He initially uses the original Beginning Gundam and later the modified custom "GPB-X80J Beginning J Gundam".

Hikari Arisugawa (アリスガワ・ヒカリ, Arisugawa Hikari)
Classmate and childhood friend of Nekki. She is an intelligent student who is also popular in school. Pilot of the "GPB-04NYA Nyagguy".

Figlia Contini (フィリア・コンティーニ, Firia Kontīn)
An aspiring Gunpla Meister, Contini attends the same school as Takeru Nekki and Hikari Arisugawa. She is Italian, and went to Japan to become a Gunpla Meister, however, rumors claim that she ran away from home instead. She mainly uses the "ORB-01 Akatsuki Gundam Corleone", which is named for Vito Corleone, a character in her favorite movie, The Godfather.She initially sees herself as a rival of Takeru Nekki, yet develops romantic feelings for him later on.

== Mecha ==
=== Original units ===
GPB-X80 Beginning Gundam (ビギニングガンダム, Biginingu Gandamu)
The Beginning Gundam is Haru's first Gunpla Gundam-type bought at Shiokaze Park. A close-combat-type mobile suit equipped with nine beam-sabers, head-mounted beam vulcan cannons, a beam rifle and an asymmetrically designed shield. Haru uses three beam sabers at once in combat, which was not intended in the original design, as the kit would surpass the power of most of the normal Gunpla kits. On its first Gunpla Battle, the Beginning Gundam defeats Koji's custom Hi-ν Gundam, but is quickly challenged and defeated by the veteran master builder Boris Schauer and his Forever Gundam. Following this match, Haru works hard to rebuild and detail the Beginning Gundam to improve its performance.

GPB-X80-30F Beginning 30 Gundam (ビギニング30ガンダム, Biginingu Sātī Gandamu)
The Beginning 30 Gundam is an upgraded version of the Beginning Gundam using an exclusive "IFS Unit" parts runner provided by Haru's father with some design output by Boris Schauer. The Gundam is now outfitted with extra armor and vernier boosters for increased performance and defense. The unit is also capable of using its beam sabers as bits and is armed with an I-Field generator.

GPB-X80 Beginning Gundam Color D (ビギニングガンダムカラーD, biginingugandamukarā D)
A standard Beginning Gundam model kit built by Shingo Asume, who would paint its blue parts with darker blue colors. Shingo would continue to further customize the Beginning Gundam Color D into the GPB-X80D Beginning D Gundam.

GPB-X80 Beginning Gundam Strong Beam Horn equipped (ビギニングガンダム ストロング・ビーム・ホーン装備, Biginingugandamu suto rongu bīmu hōn sōbi)
Appears only in the manga version. The Beginning's head antenna has been replaced with a Strong Beam Horn made from clear plastic. It is usually stored behind the shield. By accelerating with the vernier added to the backpack, the Beam Horn can also become a beam shield that envelops the unit. The special move of Beginning Musou Second Form is the Lightning Power Beetle, which charges while in beam shield mode.

GPB-X80 Beginning Gundam Underwater Combat Version (ビギニングガンダム 水中戦仕様, biginingugandamu suichū-sen shiyō)
Appears only in the manga version. The Beginning's arms have been replaced with those of the 1/144 High Grade Cosmic Era (CE) ZGMF-X31S Abyss Gundam. Its ability to move underwater has improved. Its special move is the Sound Sonic Punch, which uses the small speaker installed on Kenta's Dodai II to project sound waves at close range.

GPB-X80 Beginning Gundam Heavily Armed (ビギニングガンダム 重武装仕様, biginingugandamu jū busō shiyō)
Appears only in the manga version. A Beginning equipped with heavy armaments. Its mobility, firepower, and defense are all enhanced, but each parameter has an imbalance.

GPB-X80J Beginning J Gundam (ビギニングJガンダム; biginingujgandamu)
Modified version original Beginning Gundam colouring white half red crimson by idea Takeru, is also with equipment two weapons long blade swords, The blueprints of the Beginning J Gundam that Takeru found in his grandfather's house was actually created by Bandai Hobby Division to evaluate whether the Gunpla should be commercialized. The Gunpla was later released as an actual HG model kit and known as "late type" to differentiate it from Takeru's own scratch-built unit, which was called the "early type".

GPB-X80JFA Beginning J Gundam Burning Cloth (ビギニングJガンダム バーニングクロス, Biginingu J Gandamu bāningukurosu)
Variant of Beginning J Gundam Inspired by the Skull Heart "Full Cloth", the Beginning J Gundam Burning Cloth is equipped with the wing binders of the HGFC Master Gundam & Fuunsaiki as a removable, cloak-like armor for added defense. Known as 'Burning Cloth', this armor is designed to be flexible so as not to hinder the arm movements of the Gunpla during close combat. For increased mobility, it can combine with the Mobile Horse Bakunetsurekka, a modified Fuunsaiki, to form the centaur-like 'Kentauros Mode'. In this mode, the Bakunetsurekk's head can be used as a weapon and capable of emitting a beam lance.

GPB-X80J/7S Beginning J Gundam Seven Sword (ビギニングJガンダム セブンソード, Biginingu J Gandamu sebunsōdo)
Upgraded version of Beginning J Gundam, to further enhance its close combat abilities, is armed with weapons taken from the HG GN-0000GNHW/7SG 00 Gundam Seven Sword/G. These weapons are fitted with the 'IFS' units (I-Field control System unit) and renamed. When the IFS units in these weapons resonate with the IFS units on the Gunpla's body, the energy conversion efficiency as well as the Gunpla's responsiveness are improved.

GPB-X80D Beginning D Gundam (ビギニングDガンダム, Biginingu D Gandamu)
Modified new version original Beginning Gundam color D custom use, the Beginning D Gundam has the same basic performance as the original Beginning Gundam, but can enhance its abilities by switching or adding external equipment, making it highly expandable. The Beginning D Gundam's basic armaments remain the same, but has a new custom beam rifle and although the beam sabers mounted on the back are reduced from six to just two, they have a higher output. It retains the darker color scheme used with the Beginning Gundam Color D, representing how the Beginning D Gundam has gone through some harsh weather, this minor detail actually increase its performance in Gunpla Battle match.

GPB-X80D Beginning D Gundam "Qan(T)" (ビギニングDガンダム“クアンタ”, Biginingu D Gandamu “kuanta”)

GPB-X80D Perfect Beginning D Gundam (パーフェクトビギニング Dガンダム, Pāfekutobiginingu D Gandamu)

GPB-X80DJ Beginning DJ Gundam (ビギニングDJガンダム, Biginingu DJ Gandamu)

GPB-X80D Beginning D Gundam Titus (ビギニングD ガンダムタイタス, biginingu D gandamutaitasu)

=== Customized units ===
GPB-X38-30 Forever Gundam (フォーエバーガンダム, Fōebā Gandamu)
The Forever Gundam is Boris Schauer's customized Gunpla based on the 1/144 High Grade Version G30th (HG Ver.G30th) RX-78-2 Gundam, with additional armor and four detachable Variable Speed Beam Rifle (VSBR) funnels. As the chest armor covers the beam saber holders on the backpack, the beam sabers are mounted on the forearms.

RX-93-ν2 Hi-ν Gundam GPB Color (Hi-νガンダム GPBカラー, Hai nyū Gandamu Jī Pī Bī Karā)
The Hi-ν Gundam GPB Color is Koji's Gunpla that he uses to challenge Haru. Apparently a customized version of the 1/144 High Grade Universal Century (HGUC) RX-93-ν2 Hi-ν (Nu) Gundam with an original white and black color scheme. In animation production, three kits of Hi-ν Gundam were used in order to obtain three pairs of movable fin funnels (in the actual Gunpla, only one pair is movable). In episode one, the Hi-ν is defeated by the Beginning Gundam, as it was built by Koji's manager, who did not discover a weak polycap on its left hip. In episode 3, Koji rebuilds the kit by himself; however, it is defeated by the Beginning 30 in the A Baoa Qu stage of the Gunpla Battle tournament.

GPB-06F Super Custom Zaku F2000 (スーパーカスタムザクF2000, Sūpā Kasutamu Zaku Efu Nisen)
The Super Custom Zaku F2000 is Tatsu's customized, heavily armed Gunpla, based on the 1/144 HGUC MS-06F2 Zaku F2. It is colored purple and dark gray. Armament consists of a Deadend G Heat Hawk, Super Custom MMP-80 90mm Machine Gun and MMP-78 120mm Zaku Machine Gun, a forearm-mounted machine gun and shoulder-mounted missile launchers. In addition, the Zaku F2000 has two additional arms to hold all of its weaponry. The Zaku F2000 displays its lethal potential in episode 2 by heavily damaging Kenta's Byaku Shiki, but reveals its Achilles' heel when the poor-quality cement and putty used on the kit causes the armor parts to go brittle and crumble off the suit. This results in a swift defeat at the hands of Haru and his rebuilt Beginning Gundam. In episode 3, Tatsu rebuilds the kit with improved materials and is seen destroying an RX-78 GP03S Gundam Stamen in the A Baoa Qu stage.

GPB-04B Beargguy (ベアッガイ, Beaggai)
The Beargguy is Rina's customized Gunpla, a modified 1/144 HGUC MSM-04 Acguy with a teddy bear head. Beargguy is a high-firepower mobile suit carrying with a recorder-like beam rifle and a missile launcher backpack designed to resemble a school satchel bag. Its bear eyes are actually mega-beam launchers - a play on the term "Beam Launcher from the eye", which can be pronounced the same in Japanese. (The HG model kit provides eye stickers with emotions as additional parts.) In episode 3, the Beargguy's mega-beam launchers nearly destroy Diane's Kämpfer.

Proto Beargguy
The Proto Beargguy is the original incarnation of Beargguy seen in episode 2. It still uses the original Acguy head and is seen wearing a bear-hat and holding a fish.

MSN-00100 Hyaku Shiki (GPB Color "Byaku Shiki") (百式 （GPBカラー「白式」）, Hyaku Shiki (Jī Pī Bī Karā "Byaku Shiki"))
The Hyaku Shiki (GPB Color "Byaku Shiki") is Kenta's customized build of the 1/144 HGUC Hyaku Shiki with Mega Beam Launcher. Kenta painted it white and changed the original kit's "Hyaku" mark (百) to the kanji for white (白), calling it "Byaku Shiki" (白式). During its battle in episode 2, the Byaku Shiki loses its legs to an attack by Tatsu's Zaku F2000, but it manages to inflict damage on the Zaku F2000 firing its hyper bazooka at its chest armor.

MSN-04 Sazabi GPB Color (サザビー GPBカラー, Sazabī Jī Pī Bī Karā)
The Sazabi GPB Color is Kenta's second Gunpla, an HGUC 1/144 MSN-04 Sazabi repainted in white. The Sazabi engages in battle with Sam's RX-79BD-1 Blue Destiny Unit 1 in episode 3.

== Manga ==
Model Suit Gunpla Builders A is a manga adaptation of the OVA. published by Dengeki Comics and collected into a tankobon volume in March 2011, this story similar same use from OVA however different on detail.

== Drama CD ==
The Drama CD included with the first-press limited edition Blu-ray of the main feature, "COLLECTOR'S EDITION," contains a drama CD featuring an original episode written by Yosuke Kuroda

== Episodes ==
Each episodes is marked as "Parts" after a parts runner of a Gunpla kit.

No.	Title	Original release date
1	"Parts A: Beginning Gundam" "Pātsu Ē: Biginingu Gandamu" (パーツA 「ビギニングガンダム」)	August 15, 2010
After viewing the RX-78-2 Gundam statue in Odaiba, Haru Irei picks up the HG 1/144 GPB-X80 Beginning Gundam kit and discovers its potential by joining a Gunpla Battle.
2	"Parts B: Forever Gundam" "Pātsu Bī: Fōebā Gandamu" (パーツB 「フォーエバーガンダム」)	October 31, 2010
Haru wins his first Gunpla Battle, but is swiftly defeated by the mysterious fighter Boris Schauer and his GPB-X38-30 Forever Gundam. Learning from his loss, he makes improvements to his Beginning Gundam before returning to Gunpla Battle.
3	"Parts C: Beginning 30" "Pātsu Shī: Biginingu Sātī" (パーツC 「ビギニング30」)	December 19, 2010
Haru receives a new set of parts to upgrade his Beginning Gundam before he, Kenta, and Rina advance to the Gunpla Battle finals, where he faces Boris one more time.

== Music ==
=== Ending Song ===
"my Proud, my Play!"
Performed by: KAmiYU

KAmiYU is a portmanteau of voice actors Hiroshi Kamiya and Miyu Irino. It is also the Japanese pronunciation of Kamille Bidan of Mobile Suit Zeta Gundam.

== Home media ==
The three episodes were later compiled and released on both DVD and Blu-ray on December 22, 2010. Both versions include a 16-page liner note. The Blu-ray Collector's Edition includes an original CD featuring its theme "my Proud, my Play!", a sound drama, plus an original slipcase and special features such as audio commentary, music videos and Gunpla TV ads.

== See also ==
- Plamo-Kyoshiro - The first time of theme Gunpla series considered as predecessors.
- Gundam Build Fighters - next series from previous OVA use later made new one as successor.
- Gundam Build Divers - next evolution of Gunpla series.
- Gundam Build Real

Preceded by Mobile Suit Gundam 00 the Movie: A Wakening of the Trailblazer	Gundam metaseries (production order); 2010	Succeeded by Mobile Suit Gundam AGE
Preceded by None	Anno Domini; 2010 AD	Succeeded by None
