= Panther Creek =

Panther Creek may refer to:

== Streams ==
=== Florida ===
- Panther Creek (Florida), a tributary of East Bay River, near Navarre, Florida

=== Idaho ===
- Panther Creek (Idaho), a tributary of the Salmon River (Idaho)

=== Illinois ===
- Panther Creek (Illinois River), a tributary of the Illinois River, in Calhoun County
- Panther Creek (Mackinaw River), a tributary of the Mackinaw River
- Panther Creek (North Fork Embarras River), a tributary of the North Fork Embarras River
- Jim Edgar Panther Creek State Fish and Wildlife Area, in Cass County

=== Iowa ===
- Panther Creek (Iowa), a tributary of the Raccoon River

=== Missouri ===
- Panther Creek (Blackwater River)
- Panther Creek (Brush Creek tributary)
- Panther Creek (Caldwell County)
- Panther Creek (Cape Girardeau County)
- Panther Creek (East Fork Grand River tributary)
- Panther Creek (James River)
- Panther Creek (Osage Fork Gasconade River)
- Panther Creek (Osage River)
- Panther Creek (Polk County)

=== New York ===
- Panther Creek (Schoharie Creek tributary)

=== Pennsylvania ===
- Panther Creek (Little Schuylkill River), a tributary of the Little Schuylkill River
  - Panther Creek Valley
- Panther Creek (Spring Brook), a tributary of Spring Brook in Spring Brook Township, Lackawanna County

=== Washington ===
- Panther Creek (Wind River), the river of Panther Creek Falls

=== West Virginia ===
- Panther Creek (Tug Fork), a stream in West Virginia

== Other ==
- Panther Creek Township, Cass County, Illinois
- Panther Creek High School (North Carolina), in Cary
- Panther Creek State Park, in Tennessee
- Panther Creek Consolidated Independent School District, in Valera, Texas
  - Panther Creek High School (Valera, Texas), in the above district
- Panther Creek Wind Farm, in Big Spring, Texas

== See also ==
- Panther Branch (disambiguation)
- Panther Run
