= Panther =

Panther may refer to:

== Large cats ==
- Pantherinae, the cat subfamily that contains the genera Panthera and Neofelis
  - Panthera, the cat genus that contains tigers, lions, jaguars and leopards
    - Jaguar (Panthera onca), found in Central and South America
    - Leopard (Panthera pardus), found in Africa and Asia
    - Black panther, a name for the phenotypic genetic variant of leopards and jaguars
    - White panther, a name for the phenotypic genetic variant of leopards, jaguars, and cougars
- Cougar (Puma concolor), a big cat that is not in the subfamily Pantherinae, but is commonly referred to as a panther
  - Florida panther, a population of the North American cougar (Puma concolor couguar)

== Art, media, and entertainment ==
=== Video games ===
- Panther (1975 video game), a battle tank-driving game developed for the PLATO system
- Panther (1986 video game), a flight game developed for the Commodore 64 and Atari 800XL/130XE
- Atari Panther, a cancelled video game console, expected to be released in the early 1990s
- Ann Takamaki, a character from Persona 5 (codename "Panther")

=== Other media ===
- Panther (film), 1995 British film
- Panther (owarai), Japanese comedy trio
- Panthers (band), American hardcore punk band
- The Panthers (miniseries), 2021 New Zealand miniseries

== Brands and enterprises ==
- Panther (company), German maker of professional camera cranes and dollies
- Panther (motorcycle), British brand
- Panther (publisher), publishing house specialising in paperback fiction
- Panther Westwinds, defunct British car manufacturer
- Falcon Air Express (callsign "PANTHER")

== People ==
- Yoshikazu Yahiro, Japanese metal guitarist, known as Panther and formerly as Circuit.V.Panther
- The Panther (Sam Brushell), Indian who lived in Otsego County, New York in the 1800s
- Anne Panther (birth 1982), German FIBA basketball official
- Clinton Panther (birth 1991), South African field hockey player
- Jim Panther (birth 1945), American major league baseball player
- Manny Panther (birth 1984), Scottish former footballer

== Political groups ==
- Black Panther Party, Black nationalist organization
- Black Panthers (Israel), Israeli protest movement
- Dalit Panthers, revolutionary anti-caste organization founded by dalits in Maharashtra, India
- Gray Panthers, American organization promoting senior citizens' rights
- Polynesian Panthers, political group in New Zealand
- White Panther Party, political collective founded to support the Black Panthers

== Science and technology ==
- PANTHER (Protein ANalysis THrough Evolutionary Relationships), a biological database of gene/protein families
- DR DOS "Panther", the code-name of Novell's Novell DOS 7
- Mac OS X Panther, an operating system

== Sports ==
=== Professional and amateur sports ===
==== Basketball ====
- GiroLive Panthers Osnabrück, a German women's basketball team
- Helsinki Panthers, a basketball club from Helsinki, Finland
- Indian Panthers, Indian basketball team in New Zealand NBL
- Les Panthères, nickname for Gabon's national basketball team
- Soweto Panthers, a South African basketball team

==== Ice hockey ====
- Augsburger Panther, a DEL ice hockey team
- ERC Ingolstadt aka The Panthers, a German ice hockey team in the DEL
- Embrun Panthers, an Eastern Ontario Junior C Hockey League team
- Florida Panthers, an American professional ice hockey team based in Sunrise, Florida, that competes in the NHL
- Nottingham Panthers, an ice hockey club in the EIHL

==== Rugby ====
- Blackpool Panthers, an English rugby league team
- Penrith Panthers, a rugby league team in the NRL
- Wests Panthers, an Australian rugby league team
- Western Panthers Rugby Club, Bulawayo, Zimbabwe

==== American football ====
- Carolina Panthers, an American professional football team based in Charlotte, North Carolina, that competes in the NFL and is in the NFC South division
- Düsseldorf Panther, a club from Düsseldorf, Germany
- Michigan Panthers, a former professional American football team based in Detroit, Michigan, that competed in the now-defunct United States Football League

==== Other sports ====
- South Adelaide Football Club (Panthers), an Australian Rules football team in the SANFL
- The Panthers, nickname for Panionios, a sports club in Athens
- Red Panthers, nickname for Belgium women's national field hockey team
- Panther Racing, an open wheel racing team

=== College and university sports ===
- Eastern Illinois Panthers, Eastern Illinois University
- Florida Tech Panthers, Florida Institute of Technology
- FIU Golden Panthers, Florida International University
- Georgia State Panthers, Georgia State University
- Hanover Panthers, Hanover College
- High Point Panthers, High Point University
- Middlebury Panthers, Middlebury College
- Milwaukee Panthers, University of Wisconsin-Milwaukee
- Northern Iowa Panthers, University of Northern Iowa
- Panamerican University Panthers, Universidad Panamericana (Mexico City, Mexico)
- Penn State Nittany Lions, Pennsylvania State University
- Pittsburgh Panthers, University of Pittsburgh
- Prairie View A&M Panthers and Lady Panthers, Prairie View A&M University
- USPF Panthers, University of Southern Philippines Foundation (Cebu City, Philippines)

=== High school sports ===
- Permian Panthers, the high school football team featured in H.G. Bissinger's book Friday Night Lights: A Town, a Team, and a Dream (1990)
- Barnsdall Panthers, Barnsdall High School, Barnsdall, Oklahoma
- Cedar Grove Panthers, Cedar Grove High School, Cedar Grove, New Jersey
- Chapman Panthers, Chapman High School (Inman, South Carolina)
- Colleyville Heritage Panthers, Colleyville Heritage High School (Colleyville, Texas)
- Cypress Lake Panthers, Cypress Lake High School (Fort Myers, Florida)
- Edgemont Panthers, Edgemont Junior - Senior High School, Scarsdale, New York
- Franklin Regional Panthers, Franklin Regional High School, Murrysville, Pennsylvania
- Glencoe Panthers, Glencoe High School (Oklahoma)
- Hillcrest Panthers, Hillcrest High School (Dallas)
- Jennings County Panthers, Jennings County High School (North Vernon, Indiana)
- Lake City Panthers, Lake City High School (Lake City, South Carolina)
- Lord Tweedsmuir Panthers, Lord Tweedsmuir Secondary School, Surrey, British Columbia
- Middle Township Panthers, Middle Township High School, Cape May Courthouse, New Jersey
- Midlothian Panthers, Midlothian High School (Texas)
- Morehead Panthers, John Motley Morehead High School, Eden, North Carolina
- Palmetto Panthers, Miami Palmetto High School, Pinecrest, Florida
- Parkdale Panthers, Parkdale High School, Riverdale Park, Maryland
- Pine View Panthers, Pine View High School, St. George, Utah
- Pitman Panthers, Pitman High School, Pitman, New Jersey
- Point Pleasant Boro Panthers, Point Pleasant Borough High School, Point Pleasant, New Jersey
- Redmond Panthers, Redmond High School (Oregon)
- Springboro Panthers, Springboro High School, Springboro, Ohio
- Spring Lake Park Panthers, Spring Lake Park High School Blaine, Fridley, and Spring Lake Park, Minnesota
- Sterlington Panthers, Sterlington High School, Sterlington, and Monroe, Louisiana
- The Panthers, Browning School, New York, NY
- Reitz High Panthers, FJ Reitz High School, Evansville, Indiana
- Modesto High Panthers, Modesto High School, Modesto, California

== Transportation ==
=== Aircraft ===
- Eurocopter AS565 Panther, military helicopter
- Grumman F9F Panther, jet fighter used by the US Navy in the Korean War
- Falcon Air Express (callsign "PANTHER")
- Rotec Panther, American ultralight aircraft
- Armstrong Siddeley Panther, British aero-engine

=== Land transportation ===
==== Military ====
- Iveco LMV, a small armoured vehicle supplied to the British Army branded as the BAE Panther
- Panther tank, a medium tank used by Germany in World War II
- RG-33, Medium Mine Protected Vehicle, supplied to the US Army as the BAE Panther
- K2 Black Panther, main battle tank for Korean forces
- Panther KF51, prototype fourth generation main battle tank

==== Other uses in land transportation ====
- Panther (amphibious vehicle), American amphibious car
- Panther (motorcycle), British brand
- Chevrolet Panther, codename for the 1960s car that would eventually become the Chevrolet Camaro
- De Tomaso Pantera, an Italian sports car
- Ford Panther platform, a sedan automobile platform
- Isuzu Panther, a multi-purpose vehicle
- Leyland Panther, a 1960s British single-deck bus
- Plaxton Panther, a coach body
- Panther Westwinds, a car manufacturer
- Rosenbauer Panther, an airport crash tender

=== Ships ===
- HMS Panther, the name of at least five ships of the Royal Navy
- SMS Panther, a German gunboat, which sparked the Agadir Crisis in 1911
- SMS Panther (1885), an Austro-Hungarian torpedo cruiser
- SS Panther, an Italian ferry in service 1962–1968
- USS Panther, two vessels of the US Navy
- German torpedo boat Panther (1940), a German torpedo boat of World War II

== Other uses ==
- Panther, Daviess County, Kentucky, an unincorporated community
- Panther (legendary creature), featured in heraldry

== See also ==
- The Panther (disambiguation)
- Panther Creek (disambiguation)
- Panther Mountain (disambiguation)
- Black panther (disambiguation)
- Black Panthers (disambiguation)
- The Pink Panther (disambiguation)
- Pantera (disambiguation)
- Panthera (disambiguation)
