= Panthera (disambiguation) =

Panthera is a genus of big cats.

Panthera may also refer to:

- Pipistrel Panthera, a Slovenian light aircraft model
- Panthera Corporation, a conservation charity for big cats
- Panthera (or Pandera or Pantera), a soldier referred to in the Talmud as Jesus' real father:
  - Tiberius Julius Abdes Pantera, a Roman soldier of the Cohors I Sagittariorum, speculated to be Panthera
  - Panthera, a poem by Thomas Hardy
- Panthera Virus, Italian drag queen

== See also ==
- Pantera (disambiguation)
- Panther (disambiguation)
- Pantha (disambiguation)
- Black panther (disambiguation)
- Panter, a surname
