= The Panther =

The Panther or The Panthers may refer to:

- The Panther!, a 1970 album by the saxophonist Dexter Gordon
- The Panther (horse), a British race horse (1916–1931)
- The Panthers (miniseries), a 2021 miniseries about the origins of the Polynesian Panthers in New Zealand
- The Panther (novel), a 2012 novel by Nelson DeMille
- "The Panther" (poem), one of the best known poems of the writer Rainer Maria Rilke (1875–1926)
- The Panther (wrestler), a wrestler also known as Cachorro
- The Panther (Sam Brushell), an Indian who lived in Otsego County, New York in the 1800s
- The Panthers FC, football club in Malabo, Equatorial Guinea

== See also ==
- Panther (disambiguation)
- Black Panther (disambiguation)
- The Pink Panther (disambiguation)
