= Banpresto =

Japanese toy company and video game developer

Banpresto Co. Ltd.

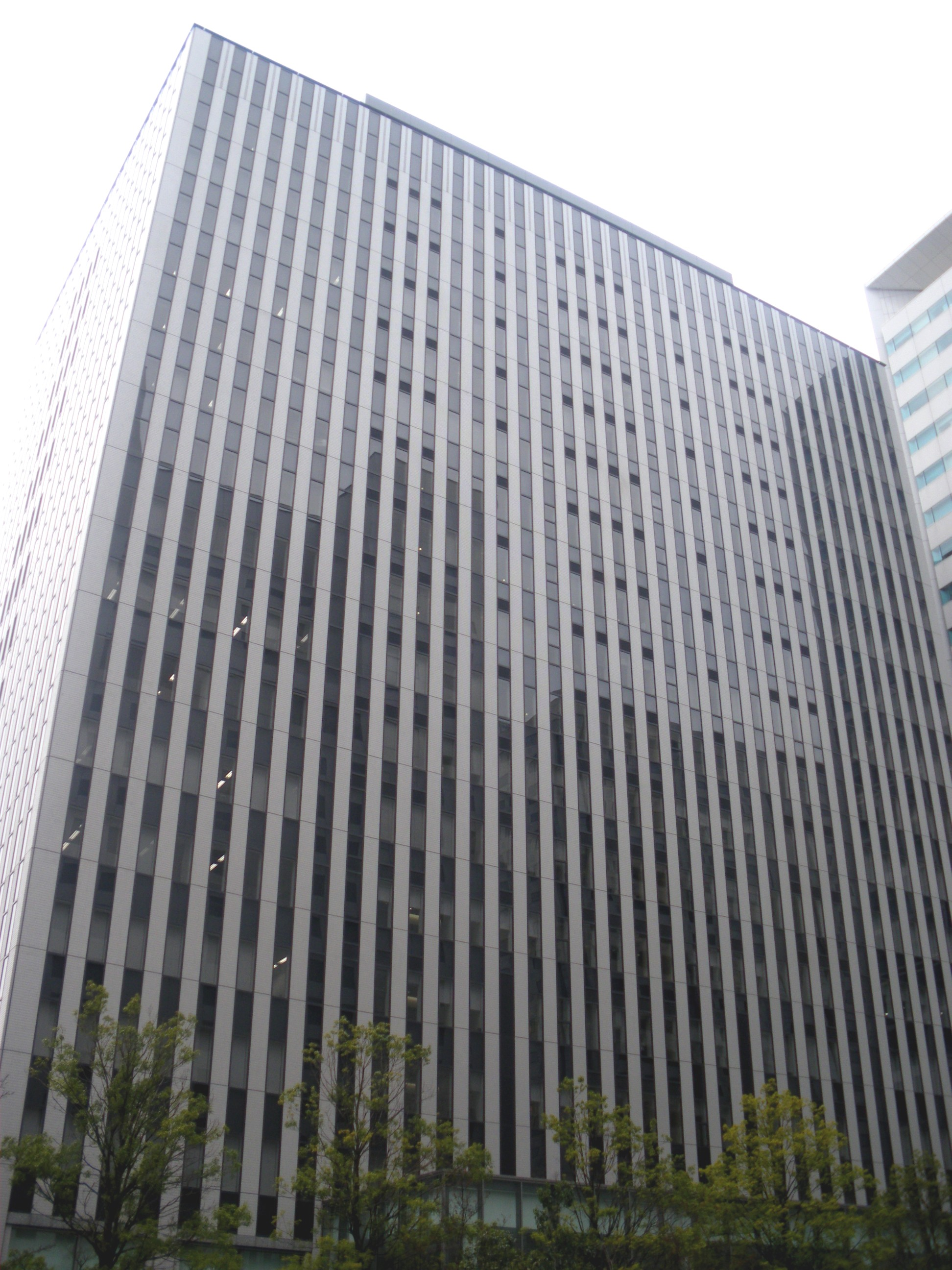
- Headquarters in Shinagawa, Tokyo
- Native name: 株式会社バンプレスト
- Romanized name: Kabushiki gaisha Banpuresuto
- Formerly: Hoei International Co., Ltd. (1977–1982); Coreland Technology Inc. (1982–1989)
- Type: Subsidiary
- Industry: Video games; Toys
- Founded: April 30, 1977; 49 years ago (Note: Current company established on April 1, 2008)
- Founder: Yasushi Matsuda
- Defunct: April 1, 2008; 18 years ago (Note: Current company dissolved on February 23, 2019)
- Fate: Folded into Bandai Namco Holdings. Currently active as a brand for Bandai Spirits.
- Headquarters: Shinagawa, Tokyo
- Area served: Japan
- Key people: Takashi Nakada; (president and CEO)
- Products: Another Century's Episode series; Ar Tonelico series; Compati Hero series; Crayon Shin-chan series; Magna Carta series; Sailor Moon series; Summon Night series; Super Robot Wars series
- Revenue: ▲¥3.020 billion (2008)
- Parent: Bandai; (1989–2006); Bandai Namco Holdings; (2006–2008)
- Subsidiaries: Artpresto; Banpresoft; Banpresto HK; Banpresto Sales; Hanayashiki; PleasureCast
- Website: banpresto.co.jp
- Footnotes "English Company Profile". Japan: Banpresto. 2008. Archived from the original on March 21, 2008.

Banpresto Co., Ltd. (Note: Japanese: 株式会社バンプレスト, Hepburn: Kabushiki gaisha Banpuresuto) (formerly Coreland Technology Inc.) was a Japanese video game developer and publisher headquartered in Shinagawa, Tokyo. It had a branch in Hong Kong named Banpresto H.K., which was headquartered in the New Territories. Banpresto was a partly owned subsidiary of toymaker Bandai from 1989 to 2006, and a wholly owned subsidiary of Bandai Namco Holdings from 2006 to 2008. In addition to video games, Banpresto produced toys, keyrings, apparel, and plastic models.

Banpresto was founded by Japanese businessman Yasushi Matsuda as Hoei International on April 30, 1977. Its poor reputation led to its name being changed to Coreland Technology in 1982, becoming a contractual developer for companies such as Sega. Coreland was majority-acquired by Bandai in 1989 following severe financial difficulties and renamed Banpresto, becoming Bandai's arcade game division. Banpresto focused primarily on producing games with licensed characters, such as Ultraman and Gundam. Its sharing of Bandai's library of popular characters allowed the company to become one of Japan's largest game publishers in the 1990s.

The company's first hit was the Family Computer role-playing game (RPG) SD Battle Ōzumō: Heisei Hero Basho in 1990. The tactical RPG Super Robot Wars became one of Banpresto's biggest hits, spawning an extensive franchise with several sequels, spin-offs, and other forms of media. Banpresto was negatively impacted by the Japanese recession during the late 1990s, as well as a failed merger between Bandai and Sega in 1997, as it began enduring several financial losses. In 2006, Banpresto became a wholly owned subsidiary of the entertainment conglomerate Bandai Namco Holdings. It continued producing games until 2008 when it was absorbed by Namco Bandai Games, and its toy and arcade divisions were spun-off into an unrelated company that carried the same name.

Banpresto produced several successful video game franchises, including Super Robot Wars, Compati Hero, Sailor Moon, Summon Night, and Another Century's Episode. It also operated amusement facilities across Japan, including Hanayashiki, as well as producing model kits, stuffed toys, and UFO catcher prizes. Banpresto has been credited for contributing to the rise in popularity of crossover video games and licensed characters for arcades, though the quality of its creative output has received criticism.

== History ==
=== Origins and acquisition by Bandai (1977–1989) ===
In April 1977, Japanese businessman Yasushi Matsusa established Hoei Sangyo Co. Ltd. (Hoei International) in Tanashi, Tokyo. His business began as a manufacturer of arcade cabinets for other companies, as Japan's coin-operated game industry had seen considerable economic growth throughout the decade. In addition to distributing games from other manufacturers across the country, Hoei Sangyo also began production of its own games in-house, the majority being clones of other popular games like Space Invaders. Matsusa's business established a relationship with Esco Trading, a company formed by Sega president Hayao Nakayama, which gave the latter the rights to distribute Hoei Sangyo's video games to other parts of Japan. Hoei Sangyo released its first original video game in 1981, Jump Bug, an early side-scrolling platform game released outside Japan by Rock-Ola.

Bandai acquired Coreland as a way to get a foothold in the arcade game market.

Hoei Sangyo was reorganized into Coreland Technology Inc. in June 1982, where it became a contractor company that developed games for other companies. One of its first projects was Pengo, which was released the same year by Sega. Pengo was successful arcades and lead to several sequels and home conversions. Coreland also designed games such as 4-D Warriors and I'm Sorry for Sega, and Black Panther for Konami.

In the late 1980s, Coreland established a partnership with toy company Bandai, known for its model kits and action figures based on popular characters like Mobile Suit Gundam. At the time, Bandai was suffering from numerous financial difficulties as a result of the slumping Japanese toy market affecting the demand for its products. Coreland's positive track record was the primary reason for the partnership, as Bandai hoped it would allow itself to secure a stronghold in the coin-op industry. However, Coreland was undergoing its own financial constraints, having accumulated more than ¥1.5 billion in debt due to poor sales. As contractual agreements prevented Bandai from backing out of its deal, it chose to majority-acquire the company in February 1989. Coreland was reorganized again into Banpresto; the name came from a portmanteau of "Bandai" and "presto", a word used to describe magic. Yukumasa Sugiara, a member of Bandai's board of directors, became the company's president.

=== Super Robot Wars and expansion (1989–1996) ===
Banpresto underwent significant changes as a result of Bandai's acquisition of the company. With Banpresto becoming Bandai's arcade game division, Banpresto was given the exclusive rights to use Bandai-owned characters for video arcade games and children's rides. It was also allowed to produce games for home video game consoles, such as the successful Nintendo Family Computer (Famicom); Banpresto received strict orders to not release any games that could compete with those from Bandai. One of the company's first projects was SD Battle Ōzumō: Heisei Hero Basho, a crossover for the Famicom featuring "super-deformed" interpretations of Gundam, Ultraman, and Kamen Rider. It is often credited as the first video game to cross over characters from other forms of media. Heisei Hero Basho was developed by Banpresto staff as a congratulatory gift to Sugiura shortly after assuming role of company president. Beginning April 1990, the company supplied video arcades with prizes for UFO catchers and merchandiser machines, such as those designed after Ultraman and Kamen Rider characters. Over 70 million were sold in the year 1990 and contributed to Banpresto's ¥30 million capital increase.

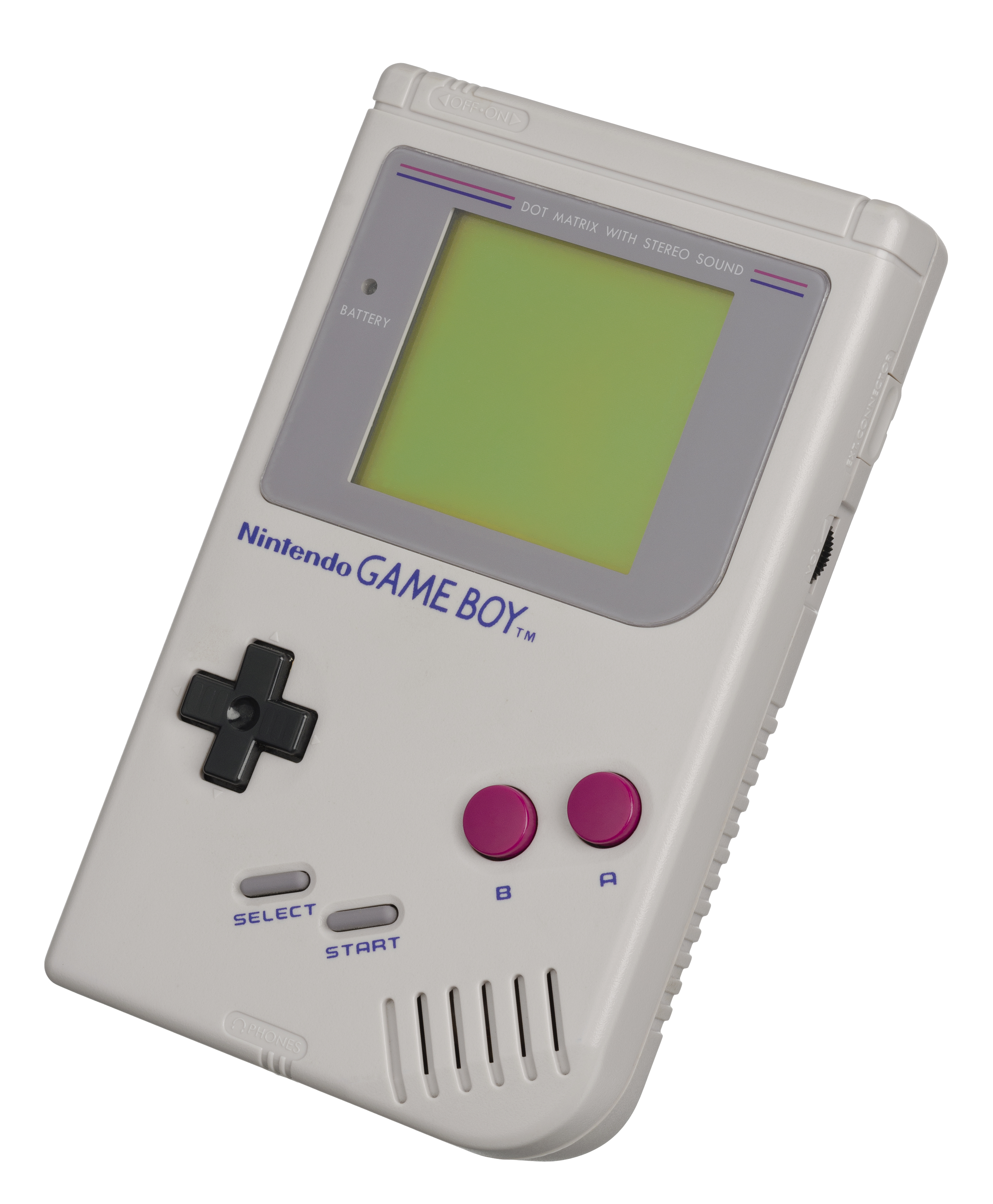
Super Robot Wars for the Game Boy (pictured above) became one of Banpresto's most-successful titles upon its release in 1991.

In April 1991, Banpresto introduced Super Robot Wars, a tactical role-playing game for the Game Boy. Developed by external studio WinkySoft, it was a spiritual successor to its Compati Hero series of games, crossing over popular mecha licenses like Getter Robo and Mazinger-Z. Super Robot Wars was a commercial success, attributed to its release during the popularity of mecha anime in the early half of the decade. It became one of the company's most-successful games, spawning a multi-million-selling franchise with several sequels, remakes, and other forms of media. Super Robot Wars is considered important and influential for the genre, and contributed to the early success of the SD Gundam media franchise. As of 2016, the Super Robot Wars series has sold over 16 million games across all available platforms. Banpresto also began producing children's rides, using the likenesses of characters such as Anpanman, Super Mario, and Thomas the Tank Engine.

By 1992, Banpresto was worth ¥1.4 billion yen. The company began expanding its operations as a result, starting with the establishment of Sanotawa, a sales and distribution network subsidiary, in February. Banpresto found additional success in arcades with the release of Ugougo Luga, a stuffed toy that sold over 2.6 million by the end of the year. The company continued to develop and publish video games for home consoles. Among its most successful releases was Super Puyo Puyo, a Super Famicom conversion of Compile's Puyo Puyo series that sold over one million copies. In February 1994, Banpresto established Banpre Kikaku, Ltd. in Kita, Osaka, which became its primary video game development division. As Banpresto was largely a publisher of games by other studios, the move allowed it to experiment with original game concepts and handle development of video games in-house. In addition, Banpre Kikaku also served as a second office, and assisted in its parent company's sales programs and product distribution. Unifive, a producer of merchandiser games, became a wholly owned subsidiary in March as part of the company's continuing expansion in the arcade industry. Banpresto began to spread its operations throughout other parts of Asia; Banpresto H.K. was founded in Hong Kong in June to import and distribute Banpresto-developed goods across the country.

=== Restructuring and continuing expansion (1996–2005) ===
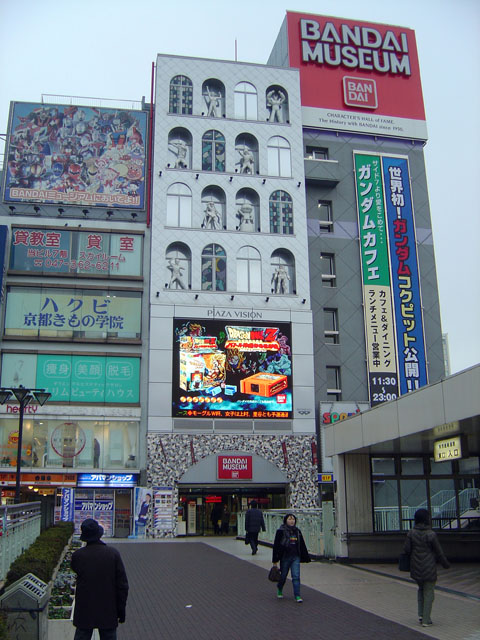
Banpresto's headquarters in Matsudo, Chiba from 1996 to 2004. The building was later repurposed for the Bandai Museum until it moved to Mibu, Tochigi in 2007.

In January 1996, Banpresto assisted in the founding of the Computer Entertainment Software Association (CESA), an organization funded by other game companies to allow for firm communications between each other. The company continued to publish games by external companies, including Gazelle's Air Gallet and Fill-in-Cafe's Panzer Bandit.

=== Namco Bandai takeover and dissolution (2005–2008) ===
In September 2005, Bandai merged with fellow game company Namco to establish a new entertainment conglomerate, Namco Bandai Holdings. Namco and Bandai's video game operations were merged and transferred to a new subsidiary, Namco Bandai Games, in March 2006. Banpresto became a wholly owned subsidiary of Namco Bandai Holdings upon the formation of Namco Bandai Games, however the merge had little effect on the company itself. The company reported considerable financial success following the merge in April, as its net income forecast exceeded the expected ¥1.6 billion to ¥2.1 billion. The company continued to produce games based on licensed properties, notably Crayon Shin-Chan, as well as selling arcade game equipment and maintaining its video arcade chains.

In November 2007, Namco Bandai Holdings announced that Banpresto's video game development would be merged with Namco Bandai Games, with the latter assuming control of all Banpresto-owned franchises. The merge took place on April 1, 2008, with Banpresto being reorganized as a producer of toys and prize machines for Japan. Pleasure Cast and Hanayashiki subsequently became subsidiaries of Namco, while Banpresoft became a wholly owned division of Namco Bandai Games. Until February 2014, Namco Bandai Games continued using the Banpresto label on several of its games to signify the brand's legacy.

The Banpresto name continued to be used as the name of a Bandai Namco division until 2019, when it was absorbed into the then-recently formed Bandai Spirits division of Bandai, relegating it into a brand of high-end figures based on licensed products.

== Games ==
=== Hoei/Coreland ===
Title	Release year	Distributor(s)	Platform
Jump Bug	1981	Sega	Arcade
Pengo	1982	Sega	Arcade
SWAT	1984	JP: Sega; NA: Bally Midway	Arcade
Gombe's I'm Sorry	1985	Sega	Arcade
Seishun Scandal	1986	Sega	Arcade
WEC Le Mans	1986	Konami	Arcade
Cyber Tank	1988	Taito	Arcade

=== Banpresto ===
Title	Platform(s)	Release date
SD Lupin the 3rd: Operation to Break the Safe	Game Boy	April 13, 1990
SD Battle Ōzumō: Heisei Hero Basho	Family Computer	April 20, 1990
SD Hero Soukessen: Taose! Aku no Gundan	Family Computer	July 7, 1990
Ranma ½	Game Boy	July 28, 1990
SD Sengoku Bushou Retsuden: Rekka no Gotoku Tenka wo Nusure!	Family Computer	September 8, 1990
Kininkou Maroku Oni	Game Boy	December 8, 1990
Hissatsu Shigotonin	Family Computer	December 15, 1990
SD the Great Battle	Super Famicom	December 29, 1990
Super Robot Wars	Game Boy	April 20, 1991
Battle Dodge Ball	Super Famicom	July 20, 1991
Battle Dodge Ball	Game Boy	October 16, 1992
Super Puyo Puyo	Super Famicom	December 10, 1993
Puyo Puyo	Game Boy	July 31, 1994
Battle Pinball	Super Famicom	February 24, 1995
Super Tekkyuu Fight!	Super Famicom	September 15, 1995
Hokuto no Ken	PlayStation	August 30, 1996
Magna Carta Portable	PSP	May 25, 2006
Crayon Shin-chan: Saikyou Kazoku Kasukabe King Wii	Wii	December 2, 2006
Gintama: Gintoki vs. Hijikata	Nintendo DS	December 14, 2006
Crayon Shin-Chan: Arashi wo Yobu Cinema Land - Kachinko Gachinko Daikatsugeki!	Nintendo DS	March 20, 2008
