= Big Muddy National Fish and Wildlife Refuge =

Protected lands in Missouri, U.S.

- IUCN category IV (habitat/species management area)
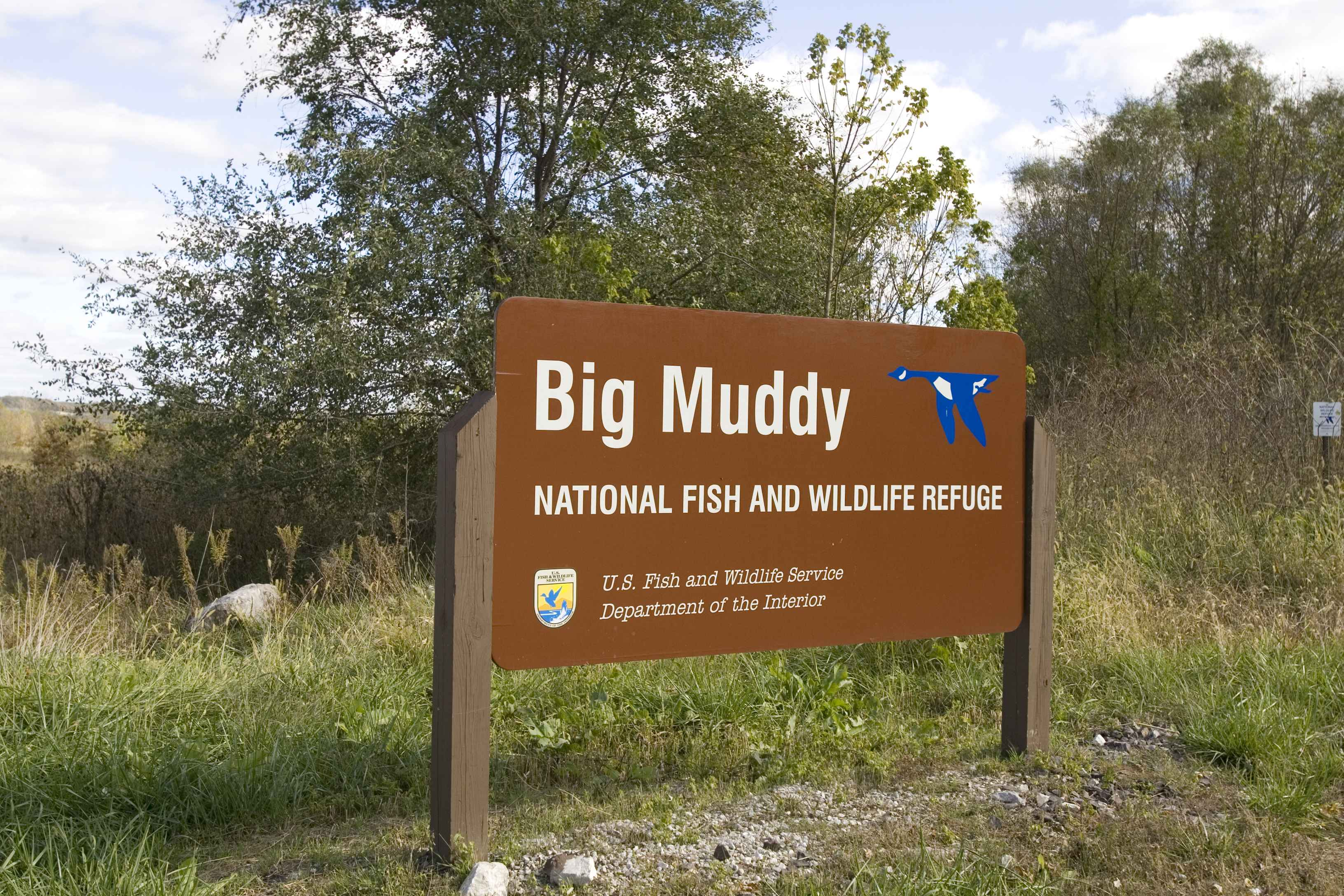
- Refuge sign

- Location within Missouri
- Location: Missouri River, Missouri, United States
- Coordinates: 38°57′17″N 92°36′40″W
- Area: 16,700 acres (68 km^{2})
- Established: 1994
- Governing body: U.S. Fish and Wildlife Service
- Website: Big Muddy National Fish and Wildlife Refuge

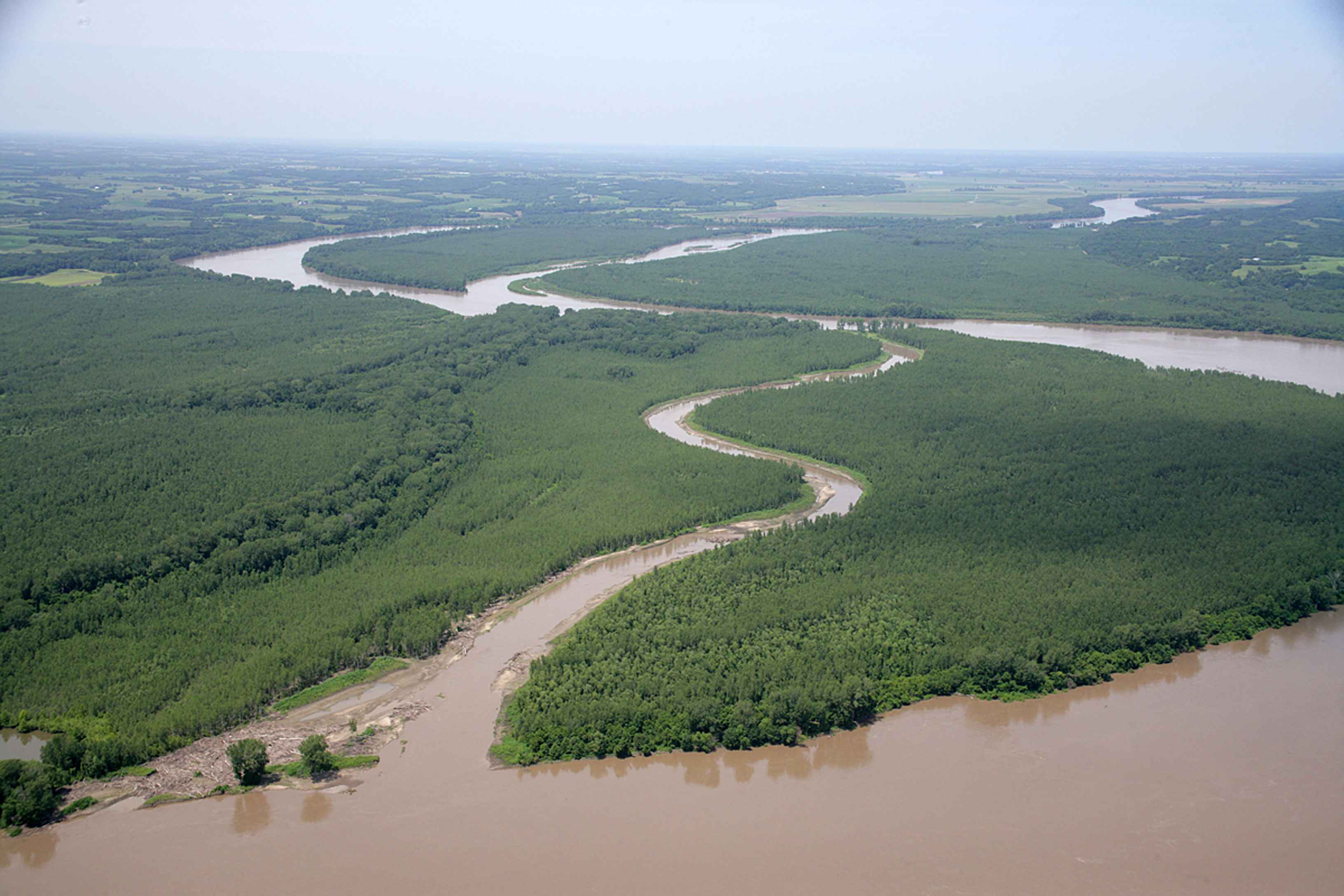
Aerial view of Jameson Island

The Big Muddy National Fish and Wildlife Refuge was established in 1994, and has grown to over 16,700 acres (68 km^{2}). Like pearls on a string, these acres are spread out as individual units along the Missouri River between Kansas City and St. Louis. These pearls of habitat benefit floodplain-dependent fish and wildlife species. The Big Muddy Refuge is planning to grow to 60,000 acres (240 km^{2}) by buying land from willing sellers who want to see their properties set aside for the benefit of wildlife and the enjoyment of all.

The pre-development Missouri River as documented by Lewis and Clark was considerably different from today's river. The historic Missouri was a broad, slow-moving, shallow river with braided channels. These past river conditions created a haven for wildlife, which included vast floodplain forests of giant trees, marshes, and even wet prairies. Today's river is channelized. It is deeper and faster, and controlled by levees, dikes, and other containment structures. These controls make the river more navigable and the surrounding floodplain ideal for agriculture.

The Big Muddy Refuge is allowing the Missouri River to be a river again, to enter its floodplain. This occurs during minor flood events. Management has created side channels, cut down levees, and allowed the floodplain vegetation to return. Currently, in many places the refuge is an impenetrable thicket of young trees and vegetation, but, as the trees grow and the refuge matures, its appearance will change. The process may take decades or even centuries.

== Missouri River tracts ==
There are sixteen separate units of land along the Missouri River that comprise Big Muddy NWR.

| Name | County(ies) | Area | Notes | Coordinates |
|---|---|---|---|---|
| Jackass Bend Unit | Jackson and Ray | 861 acres (348 ha) | Consists of the area around a former oxbow lake. Situated across the river from Fort Osage. | 39°12′15″N 94°11′14″W |
| Baltimore Bottoms Unit | Lafayette | | Consists of wet prairie and flooplain forest. Situated beside Baltimore Bend Conservation Area. | 39°13′29″N 93°37′37″W |
| Cranberry Bend Unit | Lafayette and Saline | | Consists of open grasslands and flooplain forest. | 39°15′30″N 93°25′19″W |
| De Witt Bend | Saline | 468 acres (189 ha) | Consists of bottomland forest. | 39°24′04″N 93°11′40″W |
| Grand River Bend | Saline | 268 acres (108 ha) | Consists of flooplain forests. It is only accessible by boat and is directly opposite the mouth of the Grand River. | 39°22′43″N 93°05′49″W |
| Cambridge Bend Unit | Saline and Chariton | | Both parcels are only accessible by boat. | 39°14′24″N 92°55′24″W |
| Lisbon Bottom Unit | Howard | 2,013 acres (815 ha) | Consists of young cottonwood and willow forest. | 39°06′52″N 92°55′11″W |
| Jameson Island Unit | Saline | 1,871 acres (757 ha) | Consists of bottomland forest of cottonwood, willow, and box elder. | 39°05′01″N 92°55′48″W |
| Overton Bottoms North Unit | Cooper | | Consists of large open fields and dense young forests containing cottonwood, silver maple, willow, and box elder. | 39°56′55″N 92°34′30″W |
| Overton Bottoms South Unit | Cooper and Moniteau | 3,900 acres (1,600 ha) | Is the largest unit of the refuge. Previously called Overton Bottoms Conservation Area, managed by Missouri Department of Conservation. | 39°56′53″N 92°32′09″W |
| Providence Bend Unit | Boone | | 2019 flooding created scour ponds. | 38°46′07″N 92°23′35″W |
| St. Aubert Island Unit | Osage | 1,124 acres (455 ha) | Consists of 700 acres (280 ha) of bottomland forest and 400 acres (160 ha) of upland forest. | 38°40′18″N 92°49′46″W |
| Berger Bend Unit | Franklin | | Consists of a cottonwood forest growing since the 1993 flood. | 38°40′43″N 91°19′30″W |
| Miller Island | Warren | 150 acres (61 ha) | Accessible by boats only. | 38°36′00″N 91°02′06″W |
| Boones Crossing Unit | St. Louis | 572 acres (231 ha) | Johnson Island is the majority of this tract, being 442 acres (179 ha). | 38°41′12″N 90°37′42″W |
| Howard Bend | St. Louis | | A small hunting tract within Maryland Heights. | 38°42′06″N 90°31′36″W |

== Other tracts ==
There are four separate units of land along other rivers besides the Missouri River. One is in the Grand River watershed in northern Missouri, and three are in the Osage River watershed in western Missouri.

| Name | County(ies) | Area | Notes | Coordinates |
|---|---|---|---|---|
| Moresi Unit | Cedar and St. Clair | 415 acres (168 ha) | Consists of two parcels along the Sac River | 37°50′57″N 93°48′40″W |
| Panther Creek Unit | Bates | 223 acres (90 ha) | Consists of mostly forest and a small wetland along the Panther Creek tributary of the Osage River. | 38°05′23″N 94°06′06″W |
| Schmitt Unit | Chariton | 310 acres (130 ha) | Consists of wetlands, upland fields, and bottomland forests along the East Yellow Creek, an indirect tributary of the Grand River. | 39°41′05″N 93°02′12″W |
| West St. Clair Unit | St. Clair | 250 acres (100 ha) | Consists of wetland near the Osage River. | 38°01′01″N 93°54′56″W |
