= Panter =

Panter is a surname. Notable people with the surname include:

- Anne Panter (born 1984), English field hockey international in the 2012 Summer Olympics
- David Panter (died 1558), Scottish diplomat, clerk and bishop of Ross
- Derek Panter (1943-2013), English footballer
- Dirk Panter (born 1974), German politician
- Frederick Panter (1836–1864), police officer, pastoralist and explorer in colonial Western Australia
- Gary Panter (born 1950), cartoonist, illustrator, painter, designer and part-time musician
- Horace Panter (born 1953), a.k.a. Sir Horace Gentleman, bassist for the British 2 Tone ska band The Specials
- Howard Panter (born 1949), British theatre impresario and theatre operator
- Kate Panter (born 1962), British rower
- Michael J. Panter (born 1969), American politician and entrepreneur from the state of New Jersey
- Mollie Panter-Downes (1906–1997), British novelist and columnist for The New Yorker
- Peter Panter, pen name of Kurt Tucholsky (1890–1935), German-Jewish journalist, satirist, and author
- Ricky Panter (born 1948), British Anglican priest

== See also ==
- Panter howitzer, artillery weapon developed by MKEK for the Turkish Land Forces Command
- Panter Ridge, solitary ridge 0.5 nautical miles (0.9 km) long in the south part of Kyle Hills, Ross Island
- Tallinn HC Panter, ice hockey team based in Tallinn, Estonia
- Pant (disambiguation)
- Pantera
- Panther (disambiguation)
- Planter (disambiguation)
