= Jimmie Logsdon =

American singer-songwriter

- Also known as: Jimmy Logsdon; Jimmy Lloyd
- Born: James Lloyd Logsdon; April 1, 1922; Panther, Daviess County, Kentucky, United States
- Died: October 7, 2001 (aged 79) Louisville, Kentucky, US
- Genres: Country music, rockabilly
- Occupations: Singer, songwriter, dj
- Instruments: Vocals, guitar
- Years active: Late 1940s–1970s
- Labels: Harvest Records, Decca, Roulette, King Records

James Lloyd Logsdon (April 1, 1922 – October 7, 2001) was an American country music disc jockey and singer-songwriter credited as Jimmie Logsdon. Similar to "Thumper" Jones, he experimented with rockabilly songs in 1958 with "I Got a Rocket In My Pocket," obscuring his identity with the pseudonym Jimmy Lloyd.

== Life and career ==
James Lloyd Logsdon was born in Panther, Daviess County, Kentucky, the son of a Methodist minister. He and his sister sang in choirs and took part in local talent contests, and he grew up listening to rhythm and blues as well as country music. He graduated from high school in Ludlow, Kentucky in 1940 and married the same year, subsequently employed installing PA systems in nearby Cincinnati. He joined the United States Army Air Corps in 1944, and in 1946 opened a record and radio in La Grange, Kentucky. He learned the guitar, and began writing songs, performing regularly on radio station WLOU and in clubs as leader of a country trio. He made his first recordings for the local Harvest record label in Cincinnati in 1951, and the following year joined station WKYW as senior announcer. He continued performing, and at a show in Louisville met his hero Hank Williams, who encouraged him to seek a recording deal.

=== Decca Records ===
He made his first recordings for Decca Records in Nashville, including "I Wanna Be Mama'd", in October 1952. Following Williams' death three months later, Logsdon recorded a tribute to him, "Hank Williams Sings the Blues No More", but it failed to reach the country charts. Later in 1953, Logsdon joined station WHAS-TV, and hosted and performed, with his band the Golden Harvest Boys, on its country music show. He continued to record for Decca, but his records had little success and he left the label in 1955. He also recorded for the Starday and Dot labels. He maintained a radio show on station WKLO, and interviewed many leading country performers, as well as Elvis Presley.

=== Roulette Records ===
In 1957 he recorded a rockabilly song, "Rio de Rosa", which he had co-written with Vic McAlpin, for Roulette Records. It failed to sell, but the song was quickly covered by Carl Perkins. For his next recording for Roulette, "I Got a Rocket in My Pocket", also co-written with McAlpin, he used the pseudonym Jimmy Lloyd, recognising that country fans did not appreciate him singing rock and roll, particularly a song with lyrics of which some disapproved. Few listeners realised at the time that the recording was by Logsdon.

=== Disc jockey and later life ===
After leaving Roulette, Logsdon continued working as a DJ, at WCKY in Cincinnati, and appeared on national radio shows. He made some further recordings for King Records in Cincinnati in 1963, before moving to work for other radio stations in Kentucky and Alabama later in the 1960s. He also wrote songs for Johnny Horton and others. He made no recordings after 1973, but sang occasionally in clubs, and worked for a swimming pool business and in the Kentucky Labor Department.

He died in Louisville in 2001, aged 79.
