= Martinsville, Missouri =

Unincorporated community in Missouri, U.S.

Coordinates: 40°20′19″N 94°09′42″W

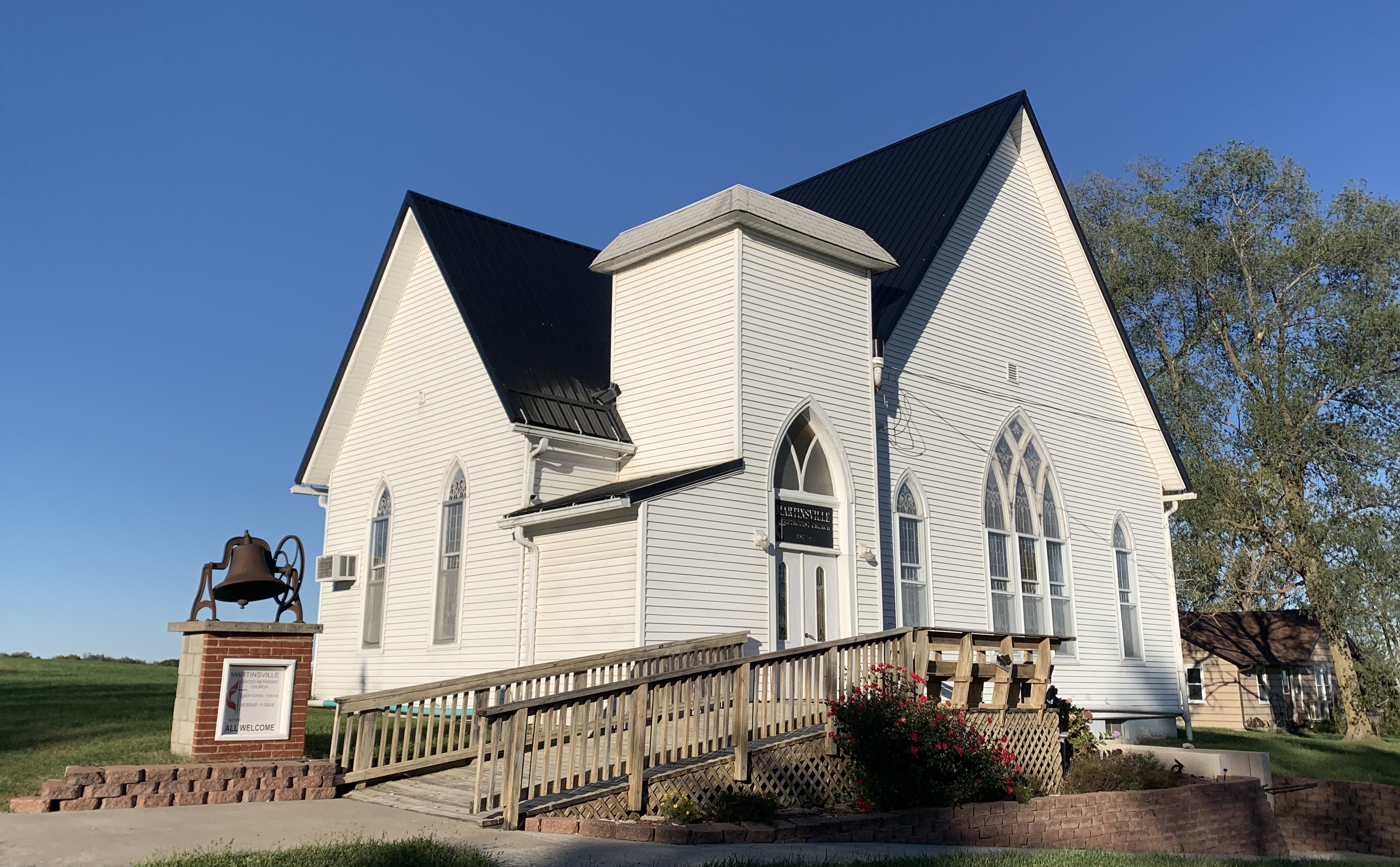
Martinsville United Methodist Church

Martinsville is an unincorporated community in western Harrison County, Missouri, United States.

The community is 2.5 miles east of the Harrison-Gentry county line at the intersection of Missouri routes F and D. Panther Creek flows past the northwest side of the community and Sampson Creek's headwaters are approximately 1.5 miles to the southwest.

== History ==
Martinsville was laid out in 1856, and named after Zadoc Martin, the proprietor of a watermill. A post office called Martinsville has been in operation since 1868. It was incorporated for the first time in 1892. Despite Martinsville being listed as an incorporated village in the Missouri Blue Book published by the Missouri Secretary of State, Martinsville does not seem to be incorporated anymore according to a 2026 MoDOT map of Harrison County.

== Demographics ==
Martinsville was not included in the 1970 and 1990 U.S. Census.

Historical population
Census	Pop.	Note	%±
1900	108		—
1910	88		−18.5%
1920	78		−11.4%
1930	120		53.8%
1940	119		−0.8%
1950	90		−24.4%
1960	79		−12.2%
1980	44		—
Missouri Census Data Center
