= Pantera (disambiguation) =

Pantera is an American heavy metal band.

Pantera or Panteras may also refer to:

== Military ==
- Russian submarine Pantera (K-317), a nuclear-powered attack submarine
- Italian destroyer Pantera, a Royal Italian Navy destroyer launched in 1924
- ENAER Pantera, a Chilean variant of the Dassault Mirage 5 fighter aircraft
- Helibras HM-1 Pantera, a Brazilian Army variant of the Eurocopter AS565 Panther
- Lockheed Martin Pantera, export version of a targeting pod for tactical bombers
- Wz. 93 Pantera, standard camouflage of the Polish Armed Forces

== Organisations ==
- Pantera foundation, a reception center for big cats in the Netherlands
- Pantera Press, an Australian book publisher
- Panteras, a faction of the Gulf Cartel drug-trafficking organization

== People ==
- Tiberius Julius Abdes Pantera (or Pandera or Panthera (see its disambiguation)) (c. 22 BC – 40 AD), a Roman soldier hypothesized to be the father of Jesus
- Orlando Pantera (1967–2001), Cape Verdean singer and composer Orlando Monteiro Barreto
- Pantera (wrestler) (born 1964), ring name of Mexican professional wrestler Francisco Javier Pozas
- Esmeralda Falcón (born 1995), Mexican boxer nicknamed "La Pantera"

== Sport ==
- Panteras de Aguascalientes, a Mexican professional basketball team based in Aguascalientes City
- Panteras de Miranda, a Venezuelan professional basketball club based in Miranda
- Panteras del Distrito Nacional, original name (2005–2009) of Leones de Santo Domingo, a professional basketball team based in Santo Domingo, Dominican Republic

== Vehicles ==
- De Tomaso Pantera, an automobile
- Pantera, nickname for any patrol car used by law enforcement in Italy
- SS Pantera, an Italian cargo ship

== Other uses ==
- Pantera, a district or ward of the Italian city of Siena
- Pantera, an album by Rahul Dev Burman and Jose Flores
- El Pantera, a Mexican television series
- Pantera, a brand of Zeos computer
- Pantera, a dialectal variant of the Nafanan language of Ghana
- "Pantera", a 2019 song by Anitta, from Charlie's Angels: Original Motion Picture Soundtrack

== See also ==
- Panera
- Panthera (disambiguation)
- Panther (disambiguation)
