= 4-D Warriors =

1985 video game

- Arcade flyer
- Developer: Coreland
- Publisher: Sega
- Platform: Arcade
- Release: JP: December 1985
- Genre: Scrolling shooter
- Modes: Single-player, multiplayer
- Arcade system: Sega System 1

4-D Warriors (4Dウォリアーズ) is a horizontally scrolling shooter arcade video game developed by Coreland and released by Sega in 1985.

== Gameplay ==
Screenshot

The players take control of two jetpack-propelled space warriors who travel between parallel universes and worm holes (hence 4-D or 4 dimensions) throughout the game. Flying over the top of the play field will transport the players to an alternate universe. The players can travel back and forth defeating enemies until they reach a boss creature. On some occasions a worm hole will appear in the middle of the play field and the players are taken to even stranger worlds.

== See also ==
- Forgotten Worlds; another horizontally scrolling shooter arcade game with human protagonists.
