= I'm Sorry (video game) =

1985 video game

- Arcade flyer
- Developer: Coreland
- Publisher: Sega
- Platform: Arcade
- Release: NA/JP: April 1985
- Genres: Maze
- Modes: Single player, multiplayer
- Arcade system: Sega System 1

I'm Sorry, known in Japan as Gombe's I'm Sorry (ごんべえのあいむそ〜り〜, Gonbē no Aimusōrī), is a 1985 maze video game developed by Coreland and published by Sega for arcades. It is a political satire video game that stars a caricature of former Prime Minister of Japan Kakuei Tanaka. The title is actually a play on the Japanese word for Prime Minister, sōri (総理). I'm Sorry was made after the Lockheed bribery scandals, and satirizes Tanaka's greed by making the goal of the game acquiring gold bars. Despite the game's context in Japanese politics, I'm Sorry was localized to American arcades without much alteration.

== Gameplay ==
The goal is for the greedy protagonist to collect all the gold bars while jumping over or defeating various enemies and obstacles in each maze-like level. Some of these enemies are: Giant Baba (a Japanese wrestler), a moonwalking Michael Jackson, Madonna, Japanese comedian Tamori, Carl Lewis, moving statues (activated when passed by). Some obstacles include: Gates, "fire" hydrants, safes (making it difficult to gain access to the gold), a rolling barrel, conveyor belts, and a swimming pool with platforms ranging in size and strength.

When the player collects all the gold in a given level, they must cash it into a building (labeled "out" when the level begins and "in" once all the gold is retrieved) to beat the level. The player can only hold ten bars of gold at once. In later levels there are more than 10 bars of gold, so the player must make multiple deposits.

== Levels ==
The game has 4 maps. After every 4 levels the game returns to first map. However, the difficulty of the map is increased by adding one of the following:

- More enemies
- More difficult enemies
- Conveyor belts
- Gates
- Disappearing platforms
- More gold
- Safes

There are 32 distinct levels. Once level 32 is completed, the player returns to level 16.

== Reception ==
In Japan, Game Machine listed I'm Sorry in their May 15, 1985, issue as being the most-successful table arcade unit of the month.
