= History of amusement parks in Japan =

In Japan, amusement parks have been historically used to describe botanical gardens, festival spaces, and conventional parks with amusement equipment. These parks were originally a place for the wealthy to spend money and time; however, in modern times they have become popular with the general public.

The first Japanese amusement park, Hanayashiki, opened as a botanical garden at the end of the Edo period, in 1853. The park featured tree peonies and chrysanthemums, but around 1872 a more conventional amusement facility was established. Hanayashiki closed in 1942 due to World War II. Post-war, the park reopened in 1947 as Asakusa Hanayashiki. Tarazuka New Onsen (宝塚新温泉), which was purpose built in 1911 as an amusement park, also claimed the title of oldest amusement park before it closed in 2003.

The longest continually operating amusement park in Japan is Hirakata Park in Osaka. It has been in operation since 1912, and has been renovated multiple times.

== Early beginnings ==
=== Edo period (1603–1868) ===
During the beginning to mid-Edo period, Daimyo (Japanese feudal lords) built large botanical gardens within their residences and temple grounds. These gardens featured seasonal flowers such as plum blossoms and chrysanthemums and served as popular luxurious leisure spaces for the wealthy. One of these gardens is Hanayashiki, which debuted in 1853, close to the end of the Edo period. This park featured tree peopnies and chrysanthemums.

In 1852, Saito wrote “Since spring, we have been planting many plum trees in a forest at Sensoji Temple on an area of 6,000 square meters, as well as flowers in all seasons. The pond has been dug to add to the beauty of the area, and resting places have been provided in several places. There is completed in the summer and has been open to the public since June. This was the brainchild of Gardener Rokusaburo”.

== Modernization and expansion ==
=== Meiji era & Taisho period (1868–1926) ===
By 1872, during the Meiji era (1868–1912), Hanayashiki transitioned into a conventional amusement park by featuring amusement facilities and exhibiting animals and oddities.

Private railway companies began to build amusement parks around railway stations in order to increase the number of passengers. The concept of Japanese amusement park is largely influenced by Ichizō Kobayashi.

One example is the Takarazuka New Onsen (宝塚新温泉), a hot spring facility, established in 1911 by Hankyu Corporation. The corporation's founder, Kobayashi established the Arima Electric Railway (Hankyu Railway Takarazuka Line now) from Umeda, Osaka to Takarazuka, Hyogo and began developing the railway line to open Takarazuka at the end of the line.

In 1912, Hirakata Park in Hirakata City, Osaka was established by Keihan Electric Railway Co. Ltd., as a botanical garden where chrysanthemum dolls served as the main attraction.

=== Atmosphere of amusement parks ===
At the beginning of the Taisho period, urban entertainment was still dominated by adult males. For example, facilities existed as red-light districts. The entertainment districts with their am-phi theaters and movie theaters were also not very safe. Sightseeing, viewing chrysanthemum puppets and plays, and bathing breaks were major attractions to early amusement parks. These amusement parks were places of relaxation for the wealthy, as most families could not afford to attend these parks.

== Amusement parks in Showa period ==
During the Showa era (1926–1989), the purpose and target audiences of amusement parks in Japan underwent significant changes.

From the mid-1950s, large-scale amusement parks featuring attractions such as roller coasters appeared across the country. This shift allowed amusement parks, which had previously catered primarily to families, to successfully attract younger audiences. The Meiji Museum Village in Aichi Prefecture is known as Japan's first theme park, opening in 1965.

As the role of amusement parks evolved, they transition from being entertainment facilities mainly for wealthy adult men to becoming spaces of enjoyment for bot young people and families.

== Post-war reconstruction and growth (1945–1970) ==
Hanayashiki closed in 1942 due to World War II. Post-war, Hanayashiki reopened in 1947 as Asakusa Hanayashiki.

== The rise of theme parks (1980s–1990s) ==
In 1987, at the height of the bubble economy, the "Law Law for the Development of Comprehensive Resort Areas" was passed. This law gave developers financial incentives to develop holiday-related projects.

Recently, theme parks, which are establishments that charge an admission fee and create an environment around a specific theme, have overtaken amusement parks in popularity.

The 1980s brought a period of stable growth in Japan following a period of high economic growth from the 1950s to the 1970s. During this time, there was a rush to build domestic theme parks in response to Tokyo Disneyland's 1983 opening.

In 2001, Tokyo Disney Sea and Universal Studios Japan opened in Tokyo and Osaka. Universal Studios Japan attracted the same number of visitors as Tokyo Disneyland did in 1983, leading to the era being called the "Top two of East and West". However, domestic theme parks were affected by the post-bubble effect and lost customers because of the domination of Western parks. This led to mass closures.

In the 2000s, the number of small-scale themed attractions, or mini theme parks, increased. These include food museums, which are indoor facilities with a collection of shops specializing in a single cuisine or genre of food, job experience parks including KidZania, and car theme parks including MEGAWEB.

== Modern amusement parks ==
While theme parks are diversifying and developing, amusement parks are slowly closing. The aging population of Japan, as well as the country's low birthrate, are leading to fewer numbers of visitors every year. In addition, most foreign tourists prefer to visit large American theme parks such as Universal Studios Japan and Tokyo Disney Resort.

In recent years, theme parks have made large capital investments into their parks in order to maintain and introduce attractions. However, domestic amusement parks have not had the financial resources to invest in maintenance or new attractions.

=== Effects of the COVID-19 pandemic ===
During the COVID-19 pandemic, most of Japan's amusement parks and theme parks were forced to close due to Japan government policy. However, they have gradually begun to reopen with the lifting of state of emergency. These reopening parks are required to operate in accordance with the “Guidelines for Prevention of the Spread of the Novel Corona-virus at Amusement Parks and Theme Parks”, which were prepared based on the Japan government's “Basic Policies for Prevention and Control of the Novel Corona-virus”, and are operating with various restrictions and infection prevention measures in place. Examples of restrictions include required reservations, cancellation of certain events, shortened hours, and limited admission.
