= Bandai Namco Holdings =

Japanese media conglomerate

Bandai Namco Holdings Inc.
- Logo used since 2022

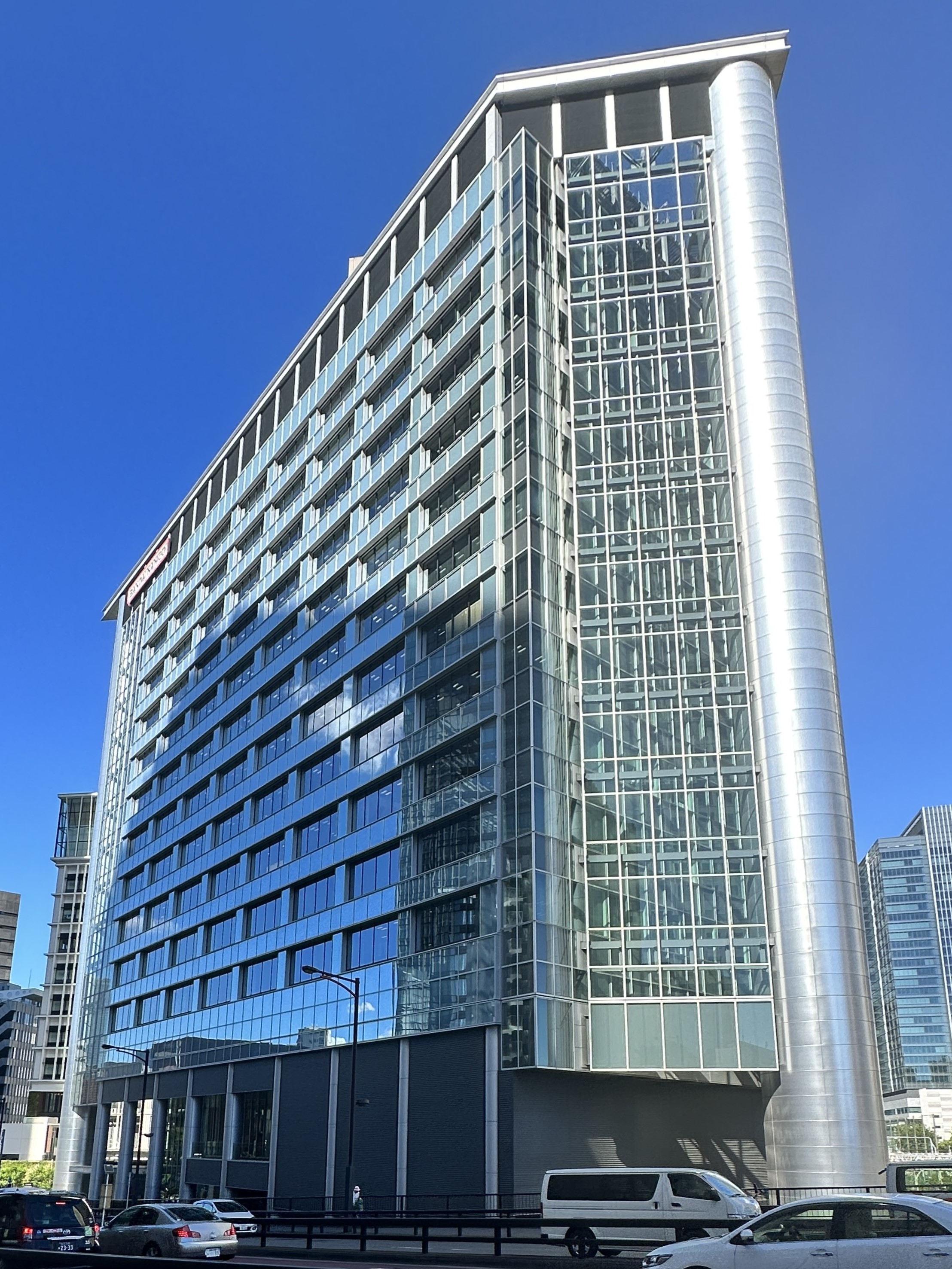
- Bandai Namco's headquarters in Minato, Tokyo
- Native name: 株式会社バンダイナムコホールディングス
- Romanized name: Kabushiki-gaisha Bandai Namuko Hōrudingusu
- Formerly: Namco Bandai Holdings Inc. (2005–2015)
- Type: Public
- Traded as: TYO: 7832; TOPIX 100 component; Nikkei 225 component
- Industry: Entertainment
- Founded: September 29, 2005; 21 years ago
- Headquarters: Sumitomo Fudosan Mita Building, Shiba, Minato, Tokyo, Japan
- Area served: Worldwide
- Key people: Masaru Kawaguchi; (chairman); Yuji Asako; (president)
- Products: Toys; Video games; Mass media; Motion pictures; Restaurants; Amusement parks
- Revenue: ▲¥1.24 trillion (US$7.84 billion) (2025)
- Operating income: ▲¥180.23 billion (US$1.14 billion) (2025)
- Net income: ▲¥129.36 billion (US$817.09 million) (2025)
- Total assets: ▲¥1.1 trillion (US$6.96 billion) (2025)
- Total equity: ▲¥793.22 billion (US$5.01 billion) (2025)
- Number of employees: 11,345 (2025)
- Subsidiaries: Bandai; Bandai Namco Entertainment; Bandai Namco Filmworks; Bandai Namco Music Live; Bandai Namco Experience; Bandai Logipal; Artpresto; Bandai Namco Business Arc; Bandai Namco Will; Happinet (27%)
- Website: www.bandainamco.co.jp

Bandai Namco Holdings Inc. (Note: Japanese: 株式会社バンダイナムコホールディングス, Hepburn: Kabushiki gaisha Bandai Namuko Hōrudingusu; BNHD) (also known as Bandai Namco (Note: バンダイナムコ, Bandai Namuko) and Bandai Namco Group) is a Japanese mass media and entertainment conglomerate founded in 2005 by the merger of Namco and Bandai. The company specializes in toys, video games, arcades, anime, restaurants, and amusement parks.

== History ==
The previous logo for Bandai Namco, used from the company's founding until 2022.

On May 5, 2005, Namco Ltd. announced it was merging with Bandai Co., Ltd. to form Namco Bandai Holdings Inc. (株式会社バンダイナムコホールディングス), with stock transfer to be completed on September 29.

The merger was finalized on September 25, creating the third-largest video game publisher in Japan by revenue. Bandai purchased Namco for US$1.7 billion, with Namco receiving 43 percent of shares and Bandai receiving the other 57 percent. Furthermore, Bandai swapped one of its shares for 1.5 shares of the new Namco Bandai. Namco traded evenly with a one-for-one share, carried out via a share exchange. Prior to the merger, Bandai and Namco had various subsidiaries that worked under them. After the merger of Bandai Namco, the respective Bandai and Namco subsidiaries were re-designated into different areas of the combined conglomerate.

On March 31, 2006, Namco merged with Bandai's video game operations to form Namco Bandai Games. Namco's video arcade and amusement park divisions were spun-off into a new subsidiary that retained the Namco branding.

In September 2006, NBHD acquired CCP Co., Ltd. from Casio and made it a wholly owned subsidiary. NBHD have since fully acquired developers Banpresto (whose video game operations were absorbed into Namco Bandai Games on April 1, 2008) and Namco Tales Studio since the merger. Formerly, both were partially owned by Bandai and Namco respectively.

The business of Bandai Networks Co., Ltd. was merged into Namco Bandai Games in April 2009 and Bandai Networks subsequently ceased to exist as a separate company.

Namco Bandai bought a 34% stake in Atari Europe on May 14, 2009, paving the way for its acquisition from French video game publishing & holding Infogrames. Until June 30, 2012, Infogrames had the option to sell the other 66% in Atari Europe to NBHD. Between June 30, 2012, to June 20, 2013, Bandai Namco gained the option to acquire the 66% stake. On July 7, 2009, Bandai Namco Holdings bought 100% of Atari Australia Pty Ltd. BNHD acquired 100% of the shares of Atari Asia Holdings Pty. Ltd. and 100% of the shares of Atari UK Ltd.

Namco Bandai acquired D3 Inc., the parent company of D3 Publisher, on March 18, 2009, after first acquiring a 95% stake in the company. In August 2013, Bandai Namco opened a studio in Vancouver, broadening its reach for western demographics.

In October 2019, Bandai Namco Holdings announced plans to acquire Sotsu, a move which would grant the company rights to the entire Gundam franchise, which the company already holds part of due to owning the studio Sunrise, which is also one of the producers of the series.

The company acquired minority stake in German video game developer Limbic Entertainment in February 2021. It gained a majority stake in October 2022.

The company unveiled a new logo and a new mission statement in September 2021 which would be implemented starting on April 1, 2022, to commemorate the 72nd anniversary of the founding as Bandai five years before the founding of Namco. The company's updated purpose was "the idea of connecting and working together to create things", and plans to work with fans of their games through communication to help plan how the company would go forward. As part of that, the new logo is based on a fukidashi, a speech bubble that represents both the worldwide influence of Japanese manga as well as their efforts to be communicative with players. On February 8, 2022, the company changed the color of their new logo from magenta to rose red.

In July 2022, Bandai Namco confirmed that an unspecified party hacked the company, gaining unauthorized access to internal systems to multiple groups in Asia outside Japan.

On August 23, 2024, the company entered into a major alliance with Toho which led to said company taking a minority stake in BNHD.

On July 24, 2025, Sony bought a 2.5% stake in Bandai Namco for a price of $464 million.

== Group companies ==
=== Holding companies ===
- Bandai Namco Holdings
- Bandai Namco Holdings USA Inc.
- Bandai Namco Holdings Europe S.A.S.
- Bandai Namco Holdings Asia Co., Ltd.
- Bandai Namco Holdings China Co., Ltd.

=== Toys and Hobby Unit ===
- Bandai
  - Bandai Namco Toys & Collectibles America
  - Bandai Corporacion Mexico, S.A. de C.V.
  - Bandai Namco Toys & Hobby UK
  - Bandai S.A.S
  - Bandai España
  - Bandai Namco Asia
  - Bandai Namco Korea
  - Bandai Namco Thailand
  - Bandai Namco Philippines
  - Bandai Namco Trading (HK) Ltd.
  - MegaHouse Corporation
  - ArtPresto
  - Sun-star Stationery
  - Heart Corporation
  - Plex Co, Ltd.
  - Bandai Namco Craft
  - Bandai Spirits
    - Bandai Namco Prize Marketing
    - Bandai Namco Nui

=== Digital Unit ===
- Bandai Namco Entertainment
  - Bandai Namco Entertainment America Inc.
  - Bandai Namco Entertainment Europe S.A.S.
  - Bandai Namco Entertainment (Shanghai) Co., Ltd.
  - Bandai Namco Studios
    - Bandai Namco Forge Digitals
    - Bandai Namco Studios Malaysia
    - Bandai Namco Research Institute
  - D3 Publisher
  - Bandai Namco Network Services
  - Bandai Namco Sevens
  - Bandai Namco Nexus
  - Bandai Namco Aces (joint venture; 51% Bandai Namco Entertainment, 49% ILCA)
  - Bandai Namco Shimane Susanoo Magic

=== Visual and Music Unit ===
- Bandai Namco Filmworks
  - Bandai Namco Pictures
  - Actas
  - Eight Bit
  - Echoes
  - Bandai Namco Filmworks America
  - Sunrise (Shanghai)
- Bandai Namco Music Live
  - Bandai Namco Music Frontier
  - Bandai Namco Base

=== Amusement Unit ===
- Bandai Namco Experience
  - Bandai Namco Amusement
    - Hanayashiki
    - Bandai Namco Amusement Lab
  - Bandai Namco Technica
  - Bandai Namco Amusement America Inc.
  - Bandai Namco Amusement Europe Ltd.
  - Namco Enterprises Asia Ltd
  - Bandai Namco Amusement (Shanghai)Co.,Ltd.

=== Affiliated Companies ===
- Bandai Logipal
  - Logipal Express
- Bandai Namco Business Arc
- J Broad
- Bandai Namco Will
- Happinet (26.16%)

== Corporate structure ==
The company's headquarters are in the Sumitomo Fudosan Mita Building in Minato, Tokyo. Its North American branch, Bandai Namco Holdings USA, was officially formed on January 6, 2008, and handles the US operations of the company from their headquarters in Irvine, California. The company's European and Asian divisions, Bandai Namco Holdings UK and Bandai Namco Holdings Asia, are headquartered in Richmond, London and Central, Hong Kong respectively. In September 2017, Bandai Namco Holdings established China divisions headquartered in Shanghai.

Bandai Namco Holdings is headed by president Yuji Asako and chairman Masaru Kawaguchi, both of whom took their respective positions in 2025. The company's corporate structure is grounded in the relationships between its employees and subsidiaries; Bandai Namco believes that the health and motivation of its employees is necessary to sustain operations, as it allows for additional creative freedom in its array of products. As of 2019, Bandai Namco is the world's largest toy company by revenue, having accumulated over $6.5 billion. It is among the largest and most profitable companies in Japan with over ¥189.8 billion as of 2020.

In February 2021, Bandai Namco Holdings announced the merger of its business units. As part of the changes to be done in April 2021, it would reduce its operating units from five to three. Toys & Hobby and Network Entertainment Unit (video games) merged to form Entertainment Unit, Visual and Music Production Unit (production and distribution of anime and music) and IP Creation Unit (anime production) merged to form IP Production Unit, and Real Entertainment Unit was renamed Amusement Unit (theme parks).

In April 1, 2025, the organization structure of the unit was changed again. The Entertainment Unit was split, with the Digital Business and Toy & Hobby Business becoming separate units, and the IP Production Unit was renamed the Visual and Music Unit. In the Amusement Unit, Bandai Namco Experience was established to oversee the unit and plan and sell facility and commercial equipment content, with Bandai Namco Holdings taking over the management duties, and Bandai Namco Amusement specializing in facility management.

=== Content units and subsidiaries ===
Prior to the recent reorganization into just three business units, Bandai Namco Holdings was structured into six product areas known as Content Units: Toys and Hobby (toys), Network Entertainment (video games), Real Entertainment (amusement parks), Visual and Music Production (anime and music albums), IP Creation (creation of new intellectual properties), and Affiliated Business (supporting companies). The Network Entertainment Unit serves as the core area of the company, where it is led by Bandai Namco Entertainment, the company's video game publishing arm. Bandai Namco Entertainment owns multiple subsidiaries, including Bandai Namco Studios, Bandai Namco Forge Digitals (formerly known as B.B. Studio; which became part of Bandai Namco Studios since 2025) , and D3 Publisher, all of which develop video games for home video game systems and cellular phones across the world. It holds multiple international divisions itself, including offices in the United States, Europe, and Taiwan. Often, the Entertainment division serves as the spearhead for market expansion. It established the Shanghai division in 2015, two years before the Bandai Namco Holdings established its Chinese division.

The Toy and Hobby Unit is led by Bandai, who designs toys and electronic devices based on licenses such as Dragon Ball, Gundam, and Sailor Moon. Bandai Spirits designs toys intended for more mature audiences, alongside prizes for video arcades. MegaHouse designs figurines and toys for candy machines, as does Heart Corporation for seasonal events. Other companies under the unit include Seeds, which produces medical equipment; Plex, a designer of toys based on licensed characters; Sun-Star, which designs and distributes stationery to consumers and Japanese school systems; CCP, a producer of sundries and consumer electronics; and Banpresto Sales, a distributor of prizes for arcades.

Bandai Namco Amusement, known as simply Namco until 2018, heads the Real Entertainment Unit. Amusement designs arcade games and maintains the company's amusement parks, including Namco Namja Town, Wonder Bowl, and its VR Zone locations. Video games designed by Amusement include Time Crisis 5, Star Wars Battle Pod, Pac-Man Racing, and Galaga Fever. In addition, Amusement provides services for Bandai Namco's "Banacoin" digital currency platform and mobile applications to promote events at its arcades. Bandai Namco Technica provide repair services for arcade machines. Bandai Namco Amusement Lab develops arcade machines, serving as the lead developer of the Taiko no Tatsujin series. Hanayashiki Co., Ltd. operates Japan's oldest surviving theme park of the same name, while PleasureCast maintains and opens amusement centers across Japan. The Visual and Music Production is hemmed by Bandai Namco Arts and Actas, anime production studios; and Bandai Namco Live Creative, handling ticket sales and production of live concerts.

Sunrise, a Japanese anime studio known for productions such as Mobile Suit Gundam and Cowboy Bebop, is the center of the IP Production Unit. Sunrise holds three subsidiaries—music copyright manager Sunrise Music, animation planner Sunrise Beyond, and production house Bandai Namco Pictures—which are also part of the unit. Sotsu is an advertising agency that also provides planning and productions for anime series such as Gundam. Bandai Namco's Affiliated Business comprises companies that provide additional support and resources. Companies under this unit include the product distributors Bandai Logipal and Logipal Express, finance manager Bandai Namco Business Arc, day care facility operator Kaikaya, toy distributor Happinet, graphic design studio Artpresto, and disability supporter Bandai Namco Will.

== Bandai Namco Shanghai Base ==
Bandai Namco Shanghai Base, (Note: Chinese: 万代南梦宫上海文化中心) originally Qianshuiwan Culture Center, is a performance center located in Putuo District, Shanghai, China. The building opened to the public in 2012 and was renamed to its current name in 2017. It contains the theatre "Bandai Namco Dream Hall" and several smaller studios and practice spaces.
