= Bandai Spirits =

Japanese toy manufacturer

Bandai Spirits Co., Ltd.

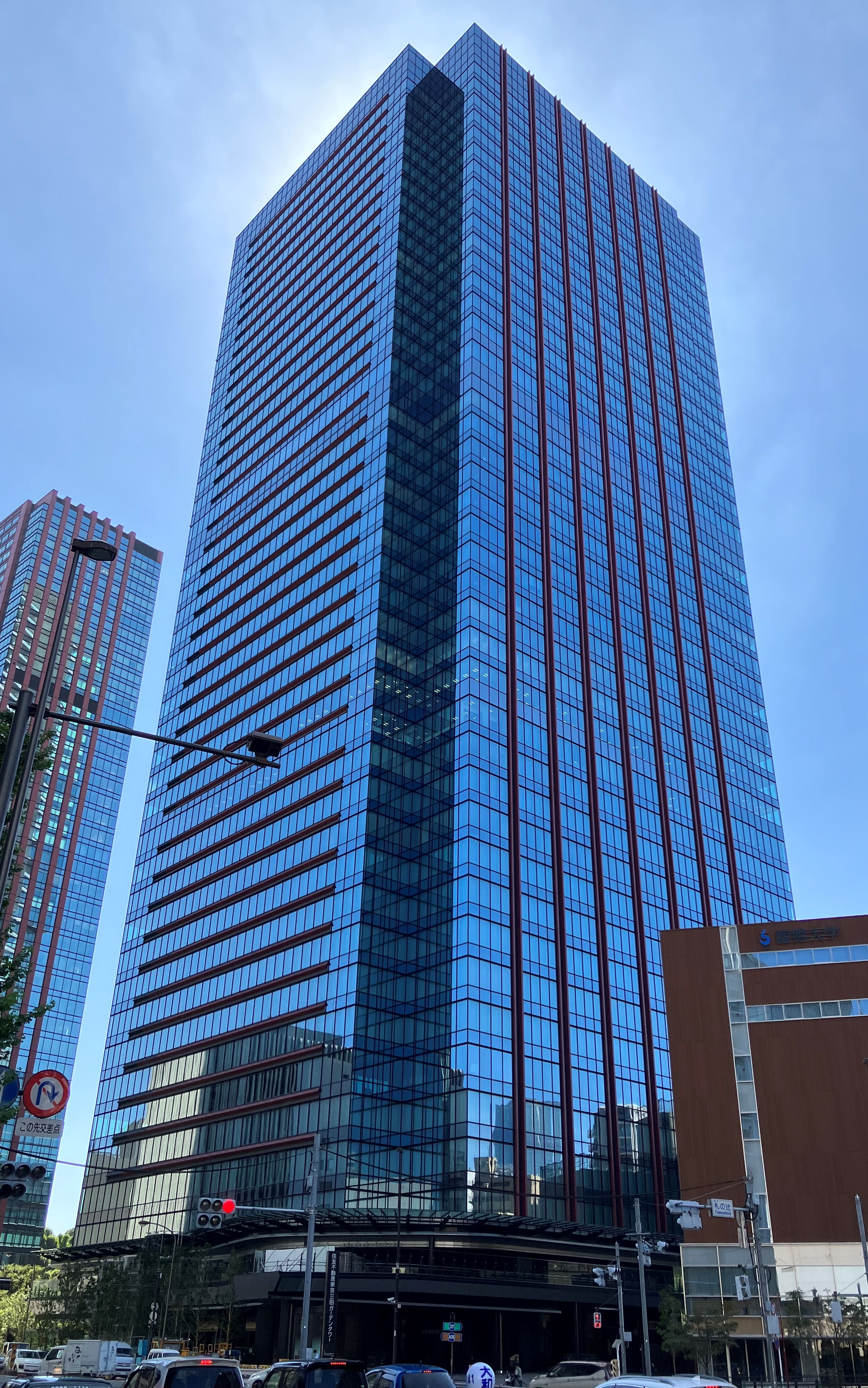
- Headquarters in Minato, Tokyo
- Native name: 株式会社BANDAI SPIRITS
- Romanized name: Kabushiki-gaisha Bandai Supirittsu
- Type: Subsidiary
- Industry: Toy
- Predecessor: Banpresto (second incarnation)
- Founded: February 15, 2018; 8 years ago
- Headquarters: Sumitomo Fudosan Tokyo Mita Garden Tower, Mita, Minato, Tokyo, Japan
- Key people: Hiroshi Sakakibara (president and CEO)
- Brands: Banpresto; Bandai Hobby; Tamashii Nations; Ichiban Kuji
- Parent: Bandai
- Subsidiaries: Bandai Namco Nui; Bandai Namco Prize Marketing; Bandai Namco Trading (HK)
- Website: bandaispirits.co.jp

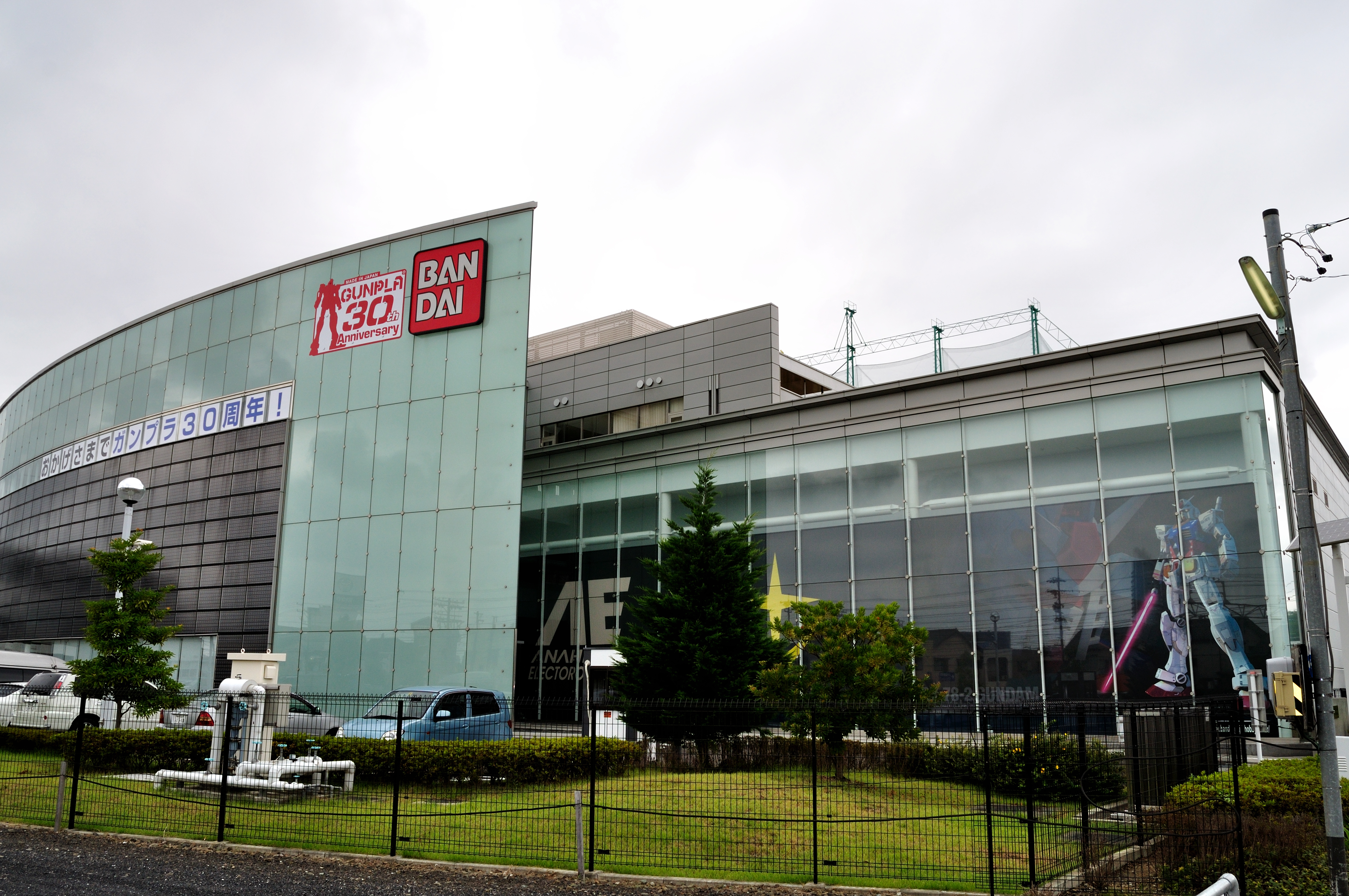
Bandai Hobby Center in Aoi-ku, Shizuoka.

Bandai Spirits Co., Ltd. (Note: Japanese: 株式会社BANDAI SPIRITS, Hepburn: Kabushiki-gaisha Bandai Supirittsu) is a Japanese toy manufacturer based in Minato, Tokyo, owned by Bandai, a subsidiary of Bandai Namco Holdings. The company manufactures and distributes toys and collectibles mainly aimed at adults.

Bandai Spirits manages the Banpresto and Tamashii Nations brands, as well as plastic models such as B-Train and Gunpla, among others. It also oversees Banpresto's prize and convenience store businesses, which were inherited from Banpresto in 2008 following its absorption into Namco Bandai Games. Bandai Spirits' products are distributed internationally via Bandai's subsidiaries and local distributors.

The formation of the company was the final stage of a major restructuring of Bandai Namco Holdings, aimed at creating more properties. This also involved the spin-off of Bandai Namco Entertainment's amusement machine division to Bandai Namco Amusement and the formation of Bandai Namco Pictures.

== History ==
Bandai Spirits was founded on February 15, 2018, and its restructuring plan was approved by the Ministry of Economy, Trade and Industry a month later on March 28. On February 22, 2019, Bandai Spirits announced that it would absorb the second incarnation of Banpresto, which was completed by April 1, 2018. On December 22, 2022, the company announced the acquisition of stuffed toy company Sunrise (unrelated to the animation studio division of Bandai Namco Filmworks, also owned by Bandai Namco).
