= Sampson Creek =

Stream in the U.S. state of Missouri

Sampson Creek is a stream in Daviess, Gentry and Harrison counties of the U.S. state of Missouri. It is a tributary of the Grand River.

The stream headwaters arise in Harrison County just southwest of Martinsville at approximately 40°19′53″N 94°10′19″W and an elevation of approximately 1040 feet. The stream flows generally to the south passing under US Route 136 on the east side of New Hampton. The stream turns to the south-southwest and passes through a portion of eastern Gentry County before turning to the southeast and re-entering and passing through the southwest corner of Harrison County and into northwest Daviess County. The stream turns to the south and enters the Grand River 1.5 miles southwest of Pattonsburg. The confluence is at 40°02′02″N 94°09′52″W and an elevation of 761 feet.

Sampson Creek has the name of Benjamin Sampson, a pioneer citizen.

== See also ==
- List of rivers of Missouri
