= Hirakata Park =

Amusement park in Hirakata, Osaka, Japan

Coordinates: 34°48′20.8″N 135°38′17.27″E

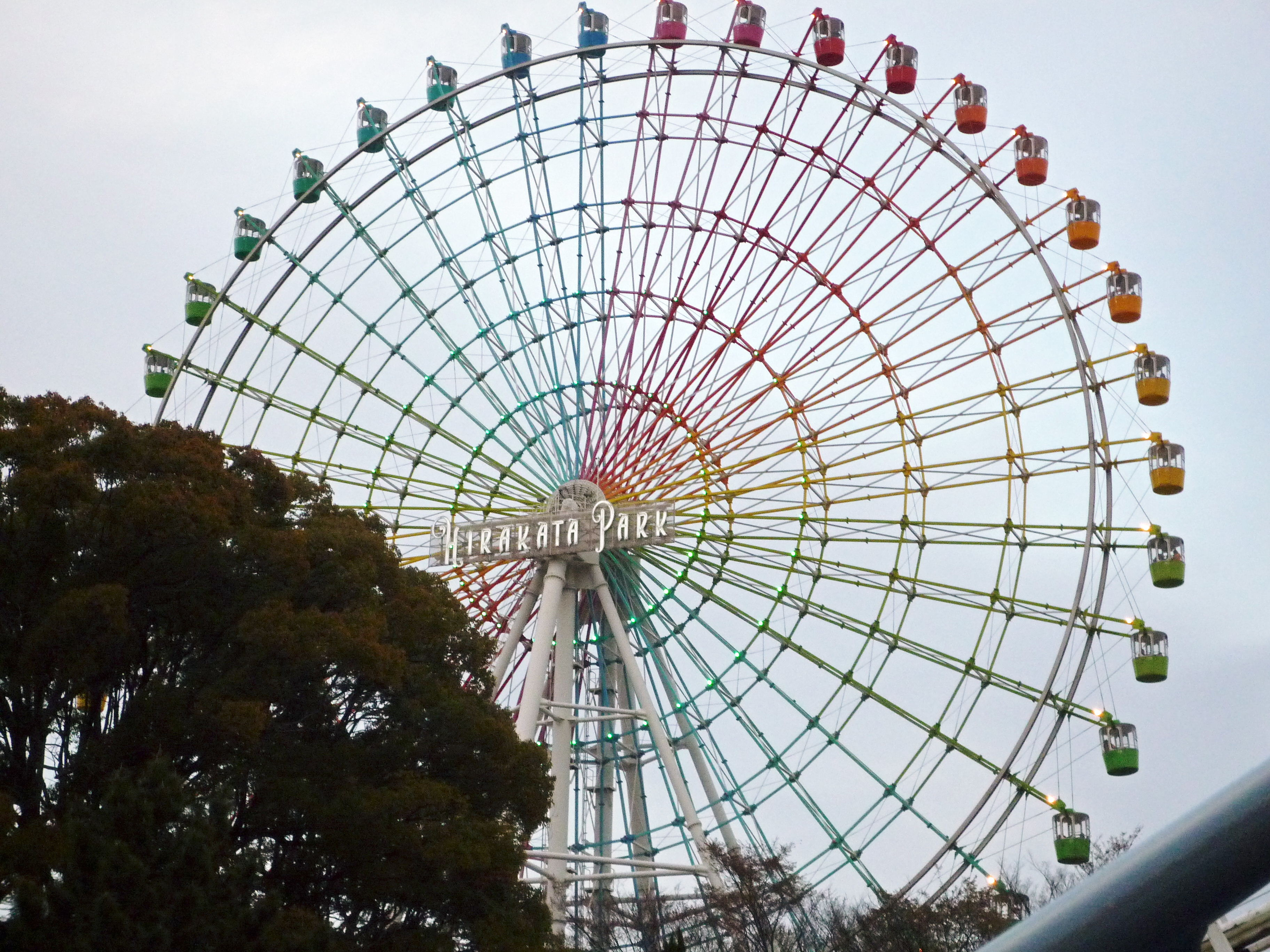
Ferris wheel in Hirakata Park

Hirakata Park (ひらかたパーク, Hirakata Pāku) is an amusement park in Hirakata, Osaka, Japan, nicknamed "Hirapah". The park is managed by Keihan Leisure Service and is located on the Keihan line at Hirakata-kōen Station (枚方公園駅). It takes advantage of its hilly landscape to site 43 attractions on 160,000 square metres (40 acres).

== History ==
Hirakata Park is the oldest amusement park in Osaka, Japan. It opened in 1910, when Kikuningyō-ten, the "Chrysanthemum Figure Exhibition," was held near Keihan Hirakata Station (later renamed Hirakata-kōen Station).

In 1965, a public pool was built, which promoted swimming at Hirakata Park. In 1972, an ice rink was built to increase the park's attendance during the winter months. In 1988, the “Red Falcon" roller-coaster was built, followed by the construction of a Ferris wheel in 1991.

Around 2000, Hirakata Park was affected by the general decline of the industry, resulting in the closure of many amusement parks in the Kinki region. This was caused by the aging population, and also competition from Universal Studios Japan that was built in Osaka in 2001. Despite having debt, Hirakata Park managed to remain open. In April 2009, the park started using popular figures as promotion ambassadors under the name "Hirapā Nīsan". The following years, Hirakata Park grew in popularity and paid off its debt.

== Current Directors ==
The first Hirapā Nīsan in April 2009 was Ryūichi Kosugi, a Japanese entertainer. He aimed to break the Guinness World Record for number of visitors. He retired in March 2013, and Junichi Okada, a Japanese TV performer, was elected as his successor in April 2013. Being born in Hirakata, he successfully boosted the popularity of the park, especially in Kantō and Kyūshū.

== Facilities ==
=== Attractions ===
There are 45 attractions in the park. The main roller coasters are Elf, a wooden roller-coaster of 695.6 metres (2,282 ft) in length and a maximum speed of 58.1 kilometres (36.1 mi), and the Red Falcon, a roller-coaster of approximately 1,300 metres (4,300 ft) in length and a maximum speed of 70 kilometres (43 mi).

On April 5, 2014, the park also started with blindfolded rides on its attractions the Giant Drop Meteor, the Mokusei Coaster Elf (木製コースター エルフ) and Uncle Frodo no Korottorokko (アンクル･フロドのころっとろっこ).

Other play areas include swimming pools in the summer, skating rinks and Snow Land.

==== List ====
- Mokusei Coaster Elf (木製コースター エルフ)
- Troll panic Pachanga
- Yūreiza (幽霊座)
- Octopus Panic
- Legend of Luxor
- Kite Flier
- Wave Swinger
- Giant Drop Meteor
- Guruguruō (ぐるぐる王)
- Red Falcon
- Waterfall of Screaming Bash
- Hairpin Coaster Crazy Mouse
- Karakuri Yashiki Makafusigidō (からくりやしき摩訶不思議堂)
- 3-D Laser Battle Makai no Mori Densetu (3Dレーザーバトル 魔界の森伝説)
- Merry-go-round
- Fantasy Cruise
- Gnome Train
- Rowdy
- Strawberry café (Teacup)
- Honey Hacchi (ハニーハッチ)
- Burning Fight
- Kachinkochin (カチンコチン)
- Itazura Mazyo no Labyrinth (いたずら魔女のラビリンス)
- Putter Golf
- Sky Walker
- Cycle Monorail
- Card Meiro Gurui Mori Daibōken 2 (カード迷路 ぐるり森の大冒険2)
- Anpanman Happy Sky
- Circuit 2000
- Dolphin Paradise
- Fan Fan Journey
- Adventure Safari
- Fantasy Castle
- World Derby
- Panic Racer
- Pipin to Poppy no Kurukuru Helicopter (ピピンとポピーのくるくるヘリコプター)
- Uncle Frodo no Korottorokko (アンクル･フロドのころっとろっこ)
- Wizard's Magical Jumping
- Dowsing Mountain
- Dōbutsu Haguhagu Town (どうぶつハグハグたうん)
- Kids Square
- Hushigi Kouzan (ふしぎ鉱山)
- Arcade Game Festa
- Game House Joy Box

== See also ==
- History of amusement parks in Japan
