= Bandai Namco Experience =

Japanese entertainment company

Bandai Namco Experience Inc.

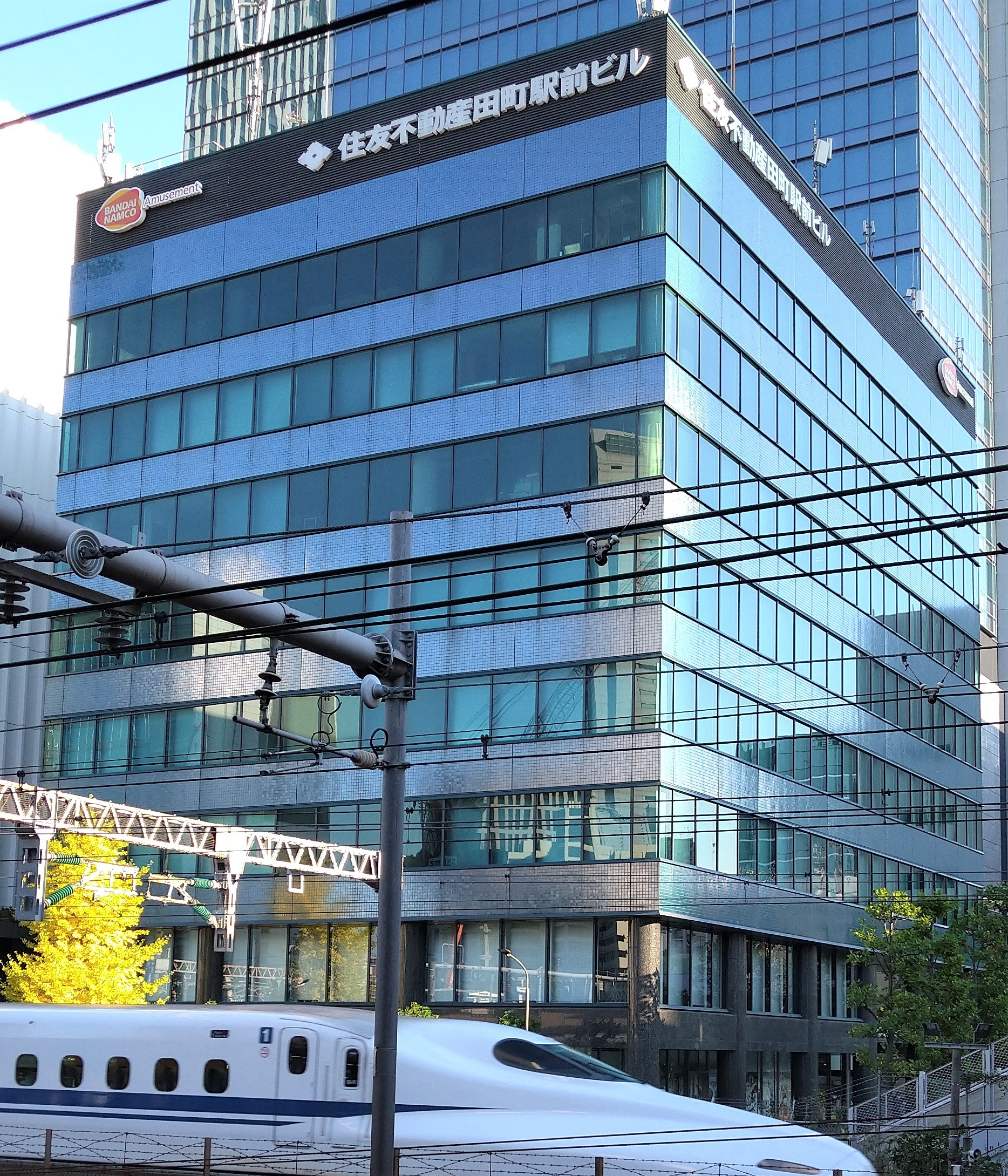
- Headquarters in Minato, Tokyo
- Native name: 株式会社バンダイナムコエクスペリエンス
- Type: Subsidiary
- Industry: Amusement, Entertainment
- Founded: February 14, 2025
- Headquarters: 5-37-8 Shibaura, Minato, Tokyo, Japan
- Key people: Hiroshi Kawasaki (President and CEO)
- Products: Arcade games, Gashapon, Theme parks
- Services: Business management, planning and development of amusement facilities
- Parent: Bandai Namco Holdings
- Subsidiaries: Bandai Namco Amusement; Bandai Namco Technica
- Website: xp.bandainamco-am.co.jp

Bandai Namco Experience Inc. (Japanese: 株式会社バンダイナムコエクスペリエンス, Hepburn: Kabushiki-gaisha Bandai Namuko Ekusuperiensu; BNEX) is a Japanese company that serves as the business management hub for the Amusement Unit of the Bandai Namco Group. Established in early 2025, the company is responsible for the overarching strategy, planning, and development of "Real Entertainment" venues, amusement machines, and experiential retail services.

== History ==
The company was formed as part of a significant organizational restructuring within the Bandai Namco Group intended to clarify the roles of "management/planning" and "facility operation." On February 14, 2025, Bandai Namco Experience was established as a wholly owned subsidiary of Bandai Namco Holdings.

On April 1, 2025, the company officially inherited the business management functions, along with the planning and sales of amusement equipment, from Bandai Namco Amusement Inc. (formerly Namco) via a company split. This transition allowed Bandai Namco Amusement to focus exclusively on the front-end operation of entertainment facilities, while Bandai Namco Experience assumed responsibility for the unit's mid-to-long-term growth strategies and product development.

The company operates under the Group’s "Connect with Fans" vision, focusing on "Experience-based Value." Its core strategy, known as the CW360 (Connect with 360) initiative, aims to build deep, multifaceted connections between fans and Bandai Namco intellectual properties (IP) through physical locations.

=== Key business ===
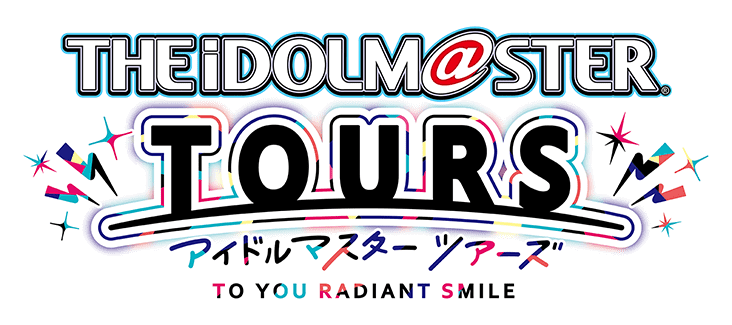
THE IDOLM@STER TOURS Logo

- Amusement Machine Planning: Developing next-generation arcade hardware and software, such as The Idolmaster Tours and Mobile Suit Gundam arcade series.
- Experiential Retail: Expanding the "Bandai Namco Cross Store" model, which integrates official group shops (toys, cards, and capsules) with traditional amusement areas.
- Technology Integration: Utilizing AI and xR (Extended Reality) to enhance physical entertainment, including AI-driven character interactions in facilities.

=== Notable Facilities and Services ===
Under its management, the unit has expanded several specialized brands:

- Gashapon Bandai Official Shop: Specialized capsule toy stores that reached a nationwide rollout in Japan in late 2025.
- VS PARK: Interactive sports-themed entertainment centers.
- Bandai Namco Cross Store: Large-scale facilities that serve as physical hubs for the group's "IP axis" strategy.
