= Hanayashiki =

Amusement park in Tokyo, Japan

AsakusaHanayashiki
- Previously known as: Cafeteria amusement park Asakusa Rakutenchi (食堂遊園地浅草楽天地, Shokudō Yūenchi Asakusa Rakutenchi); Theater Rakuten (劇場楽天地, Gekizyō Rakutenchi); Joint-stock company Asakusa Hanayashiki (合資会社浅草花屋敷, Gōshi Kaisha Asakusa Hanayashiki)

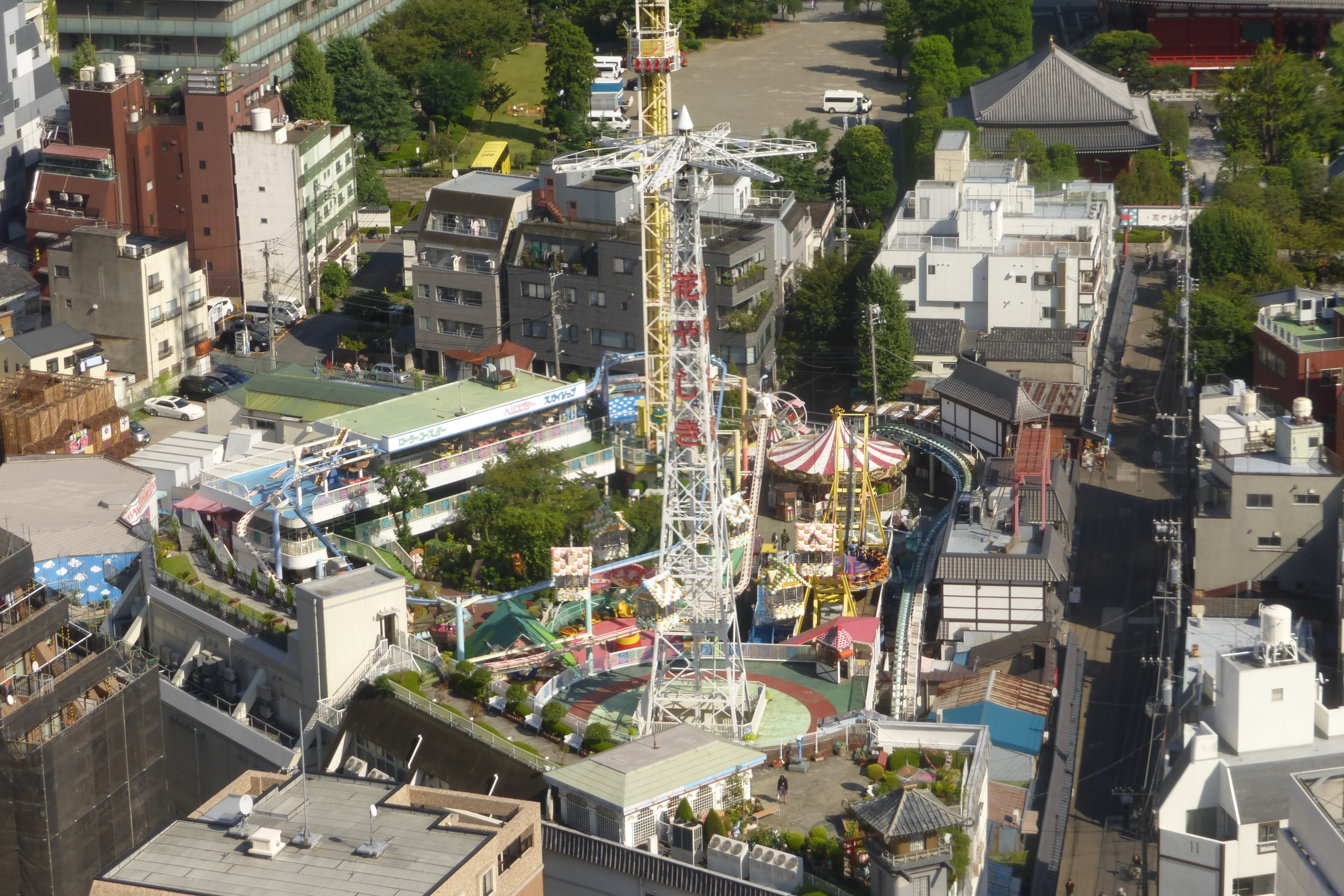
- Asakusa Hanayashiki in Asakusa, 2015
- Interactive map of AsakusaHanayashiki
- Location: Asakusa, Taitō, Tokyo, Japan
- Coordinates: 35°42′55.66″N 139°47′40.84″E
- Status: Operating
- Opened: 1853 (established); 1949 (continuous operation)
- Owner: Bandai Namco Amusement
- Operated by: Hanayashiki Co., Ltd
- General manager: Akihiko Hirota
- Slogan: The oldest amusement park in Japan (日本最古の遊園地, Nihon saiko no yuenchi)
- Operating season: Year-round
- Area: 5,800 square metres (1.4 acres)
- Website: Official website

Hanayashiki (浅草花やしき, Asakusa hanayashiki) is an amusement park in Asakusa, Taitō, Tokyo, Japan, that has operated since 1853. It is operated by Hanayashiki Co., Ltd., a subsidiary of Bandai Namco Amusement. It is claimed to be the oldest amusement park in Japan. One of the unofficial mascots of the park is the Panda Car (パンダカー).

Several scenes of Hanayashiki in 2018

== History ==
=== Origins ===
Asakusa Hanayashiki opened in 1853, at the end of the Edo period (1603–1867), and is considered the oldest amusement park in Japan, though the park at that time did not meet the modern definition of an amusement park. In the first two decades after the park opened, it was a botanical garden created by garden designer Morita Rokusaburo, featuring peonies and chrysanthemums. The place was called Hanayashiki (花屋敷), which means Flowery Mansion.

Around 1872 (the beginning of the Meiji period), amusement facilities were established inside the park exhibiting animals and various oddities. From the Taishō era to the early Shōwa era, it was known as one of the leading zoos in Japan, and frequently made news headlinessuch as the birth of tiger quintuplets and the birth of Japan's first baby lion. The 1923 Great Kantō earthquake occurred in the same year. Many of the animals were euthanized before the fires inevitably reached their cages. One famous story from that event is the head of the park pouring water on a young elephant in an unsuccessful attempt to save its life.

In 1930, "The Memorial of Birds and Animals" was erected for the animals that were burned to death because of the earthquake. The animals that survived were later sold to the Sendai City Zoo in 1935. The park was effectively closed.

In 1939–1940, the park was purchased by the Suda-cho Restaurant (須田町食堂), and the name was changed to Shokudo Yuenchi Asakusa Rakutenchi (食堂遊園地浅草楽天地). However, the park was resold to the Sho-chiku (松竹), and the name became Theater Rakuten (劇場楽天地, Gekizyō Rakutenchi).

Hanayashiki was demolished in 1944 in accordance with Japan's Air Defense Law (1937; revised 1941) during World War II, which required the evacuation and removal of many buildings and structures in order to create firebreaks to prevent fires from spreading during Allied air raids.

=== Post-war ===
In 1947, the park was rebuilt as Joint-stock company Asakusa Hanayashiki (合資会社浅草花屋敷, Gōshi Kaisha Asakusa Hanayashiki) under joint management by Tetsuo Amano (天野鉄男) from Sho-chiku and Teiichi Yamada (山田貞一) from Togo Gorakuki (東洋娯楽機). In 1949, Togo Gorakuki became the sole operators, and the name was changed to Asakusa Hanayashiki (浅草花やしき). Yashiki was changed from Chinese kanji characters to Japanese hiragana characters.

In 1953, the Yomiuri Rocket Coaster began operation. It is the oldest existing roller coaster in Japan today. The Bee Tower was built in 1960. These attractions became very famous.

Before 1985 no admission fee was charged at the park entrance; once inside the park, visitors would instead pay for each ride individually. However, this allowed for drunks to wander into the park from the neighboring betting parlor and be public nuisances. Young people would also gather in large groups in front of the arcade center, causing the park to feel unsafe. Because of these situations, operators were unable to increase their profits and thus decided to set a general admission fee to make the park safer and more welcoming.

=== 21st century ===
In May 2004, Banpresto, a Bandai group company, concluded a basic agreement to take over the operation of Hanayashiki.

In September 2016, "Bee Tower" was demolished to make room for Asakusa Hana Gekijyou (浅草花劇場), which opened in April 2019. There is a theater that provides a variety of entertainment, including performances, concerts by popular musicians, and martial arts.

== In popular culture ==
- 1986 - To Sleep So As To Dream (夢みるように眠りたい, Yumemiru yō ni nemuritai)
- 2020 - Rent-A-Girlfriend (彼女、お借りします, Kanojo, Okarishimasu)

== See also ==
- History of amusement parks in Japan
