= Black panther (disambiguation) =

A black panther is a colour variant of any Panthera, particularly of the leopard and the jaguar.

Black panther, Black Panther or Black Panthers may also refer to:

== Political organisations ==
=== Original American organisations ===
- Black Panther Party (1966–1982), a Black Power political organisation
- Lowndes County Freedom Organization 1965–1970, also Black Panther party, a political party in Alabama

=== Others ===
- British Black Panthers (1968–1973), a black power organisation in the United Kingdom inspired by the Black Panther Party
- Black Panthers (Israel) (1971–1990s), a former Israeli protest movement founded by non-black Jews
- Australian Black Panther Party (1972–?), founded by Aboriginal Australian activists Sam Watson and Denis Walker in Queensland
- New Black Panther Party (founded 1989), an American black nationalist organisation in Dallas, Texas, not affiliated with the original
- Revolutionary Black Panther Party (founded 1991; claims continuity with the BPP), American organisation
- New Afrikan Black Panther Party (founded 2005), an American Marxist–Leninist–Maoist organisation largely based in Red Onion State Prison in Wise County, Virginia

== Arts, entertainment and media ==
=== In Marvel Comics and Marvel Entertainment ===
- Black Panther (character), a comic-book superhero, 1966
- Black Panther (TV series), 2010

==== Marvel Cinematic Universe ====
- One of the films in the Marvel Cinematic Universe's Black Panther series:
  - Black Panther (film), 2018
  - Black Panther: Wakanda Forever, 2022
- One of the characters who have held the mantle of the Black Panther in the Marvel Cinematic Universe:
  - T'Challa (Marvel Cinematic Universe)
  - Shuri (Marvel Cinematic Universe)
  - T'Chaka (Marvel Cinematic Universe)
  - N'Jadaka (Marvel Cinematic Universe) (aka Killmonger)
- Black Panther suit (Marvel Cinematic Universe)

=== Other films ===
- The Black Panther (1921 film), a silent German film
- The Black Panther (1977 film), a British crime film about Donald Neilson
- Black Panther, a 1993 Hong Kong film starring Francis Ng
- Black Panthers (film), a 1968 short documentary film
- The Black Panthers: Vanguard of the Revolution, a 2015 film

=== Video games ===
- Black Panther (video game), 1987
- Kurohyō: Ryū ga Gotoku Shinshō, translated as "Black Panther: Like a Dragon New Chapter"
  - Kurohyō 2: Ryū ga Gotoku Ashura-hen, the sequel to the above game

=== Other media ===
- Black Panther (band), a Chinese rock band
- The Black Panther (newspaper), official newspaper of the Black Panther Party

== Heraldry ==
- Black panther (symbol), a heraldic emblem of Carantania, Carinthia and Slovenia

== Military ==
- 8th Tactical Fighter Squadron (JASDF), Japan, nicknamed "Black Panthers"
- 1st Scout Ranger Regiment, formerly nicknamed "Black Panthers"
- K2 Black Panther, a South Korean main battle tank
- Royal Thai Army Expeditionary Division, known as "Black Panthers" in the Vietnam War
- 761st Tank Battalion (United States) (1942–1955), nicknamed "Black Panthers"
- 66th Infantry Division (United States), nicknamed "Black Panther Division"
- INAS 303, Indian Naval Air Squadron, nicknamed "The Black Panthers"
- No. 37 Squadron IAF, Indian Air Force squadron nicknamed "Black Panthers"
- No. 16 Squadron PAF, Pakistan Air Force squadron nicknamed "Black Panthers"
- Second VA-35 (U.S. Navy), nicknamed "Black Panthers"
- 35th Fighter Squadron, formerly nicknamed "Black panthers"
- 501st Bombardment Squadron, nicknamed "Black Panthers"
- VMA-236, nicknamed "Black Panthers"
- 13th Special Mission Brigade (South Korea), nicknamed "Black Panther"

== People ==
- Black Panther (wrestler), the ring name of a Mexican wrestler of unrevealed identity
- Donald Neilson (1936–2011), alias the Black Panther, a British armed robber and murderer
- Eusébio (Eusébio da Silva Ferreira, 1942–2014), or the Black Panther, a Portuguese footballer
- Fritz Joubert Duquesne (1877–1956), a South African Boer spy known as Black Panther
- Lev Yashin (1929-1990), a Soviet football goalkeeper with FC Dynamo Moscow and the Soviet Union national football team

== See also ==
- Panther (disambiguation)
- Pantera Negra (disambiguation)
- Bay Area Panthers, an American indoor football team
- Dalit Panthers of India, an anti-caste social organisation and former militant movement in India, inspired by the Black Panthers and the Black power movement
  - Liberation Panther Party, a political party in India, formerly known as the "Dalit Panthers Movement" and "Dalit Panthers of India", modelled after the above
