= Pantha (disambiguation) =

Pantha is a superhero from Teen Titans.

Pantha may also refer to:

Fictional characters:

- Pantha (Vampirella character), an immortal shapeshifter.
- Princess Pantha, a jungle heroine from Nedor's Thrilling Comics.

Other uses:

- Pantha (band), an Australian musical group from the 1970s
- Pantha du Prince, a stage name of German musician Hendrick Weber.
- Panthapath, a road/marketplace in Dhaka, the capital of Bangladesh.
- Panthan, Sanskrit for path.
