= Panther Creek (Blackwater River tributary) =

Stream in the American state of Missouri

Coordinates: 38.933628°N 93.490489°W

Panther Creek is a stream in Lafayette and Pettis Counties in the U.S. state of Missouri. It is a tributary of the Blackwater River.

Panther Creek was named for the panthers which once roamed there.

== See also ==
- List of rivers of Missouri
