= Panther Creek (Caldwell County) =

Stream in Caldwell County, Missouri, U.S.

Coordinates: 39°41′33″N 93°45′49″W

Panther Creek is a stream in Caldwell County in the U.S. state of Missouri.

Panther Creek was named for fact the area once was the hunting ground of panthers.

== See also ==
- List of rivers of Missouri
