= Panther Branch =

Panther Branch may refer to:

- Panther Branch (Ottery Creek), a stream in Missouri
- Panther Branch (Hyco Creek tributary), a stream in Caswell County, North Carolina
- Panther Branch (Duck River), a stream in Tennessee

== See also ==
- Panther Branch Township, Wake County, North Carolina
