= Panther Creek (Wind River tributary) =

Stream in Washington, U.S.

Coordinates: 45°45′41″N 121°49′53″W

Panther Creek is a stream in the U.S. state of Washington. It is a tributary of the Wind River.

Panther Creek was named for the fact an early settler encountered a panther near the creek.

== See also ==
- List of rivers of Washington (state)
