= Panther Mountain =

Panther Mountain can refer to:

- Panther Mountain (Alberta), in Alberta, Canada
- Panther Mountain (New York), in Ulster County, New York, United States
- Panther Mountain (Franklin County, New York), in the Adirondacks
- Panther Mountain (Herkimer County, New York), in towns of Ohio and Webb in Herkimer County, New York
- Panther Mountain (Webb, Herkimer County, New York), in Town of Webb in Herkimer County, New York
- Panther Mountain (Otsego County, New York), in Otsego County, New York
