= Panther Creek (Cape Girardeau County) =

Stream in the U.S. state of Missouri

Panther Creek is a stream in eastern Bollinger and western Cape Girardeau counties in the U.S. state of Missouri. It is a tributary of Whitewater River which it enters approximately two miles south of Millersville.

The stream headwaters arise in western Bollinger County one half mile east of the community of Scopus at 37°23′49″N 89°54′58″W. The confluence is at 37°24′22″N 89°50′23″W.

Panther Creek was named for fact the area once was the hunting ground of panthers.

== See also ==
- List of rivers of Missouri
