= Planter =

Planter or Planters may refer to:

== Common meanings ==
- A flowerpot or box for plants
  - Jardiniere, one such type of pot, mostly indoor types
  - Cachepot, another term for the same
  - Flower box, another type of planter, mostly for outdoors
  - Window box, a planter attached to a windowsill, on the outside
  - Sub-irrigated planter, a planting box where the water is introduced from the bottom
- A person or object engaged in sowing seeds
  - Planter (farm implement), implement towed behind a tractor, used for sowing crops through a field
  - Potato planter, a machine for planting potato tubers and simultaneously applying mineral fertilizers to the soil
- Church planter, a person engaged in creating a new Christian church

== History ==
- A member of a "plantation" or colony
  - Plantations of Ireland, 16th and 17th centuries
  - Ancient planter, a colonist receiving one of the first land grants in Virginia
  - New England Planters, settlers who moved to the Canadian maritime provinces which had been left vacant by the Acadian Expulsion
  - Old Planters (Massachusetts), early settlers of Massachusetts
- A person connected with an agricultural plantation
  - Planter class, the plantation-owning class in the Antebellum South
  - A supervisor on a plantation, particularly in the Far East under the British Empire

== Companies ==
- Planters, the American snack food company best known for its processed nuts and the "Mr. Peanut" mascot
- Planters Bank, which merged with Peoples Bank of Rocky Mount, North Carolina, United States in 1990 to form Centura Bank
- Planters Inn, hotel in Savannah, Georgia
- Union Planters, a former bank in the United States
- Planters Development Bank or Plantersbank, a former bank in the Philippines

== Military ==
- USS Planter, a number of ships of the U.S. Navy
- SS Planter, a number of commercial steam ships
- Mine planter, a mine warfare ship of the early days of World War I

== Sports ==
- Planters Pat Bradley International, a former golf tournament

=== Baseball ===
- Clarksdale Planters, a minor league baseball team in Mississippi, United States
- New London Planters, a minor league baseball team in Connecticut, United States

== Culture ==
- Igor Planter, a fictional eco-terrorist in the 2000-2004 manga Black Cat
- The Planter, a 1917 American drama film directed by Thomas N. Heffron and John Ince

== Other uses ==
- Planter, Georgia, a community in the United States
- Planters Hall, a historic place in Vicksburg, Mississippi, United States
- Planter's Punch, a cocktail

== See also ==
- Plantar
