= Panther Creek (Osage Fork Gasconade River tributary) =

Stream in the American state of Missouri

Panther Creek is a stream in Webster and Laclede counties in the Ozarks of south-central Missouri. It is a tributary of the Osage Fork Gasconade River. The headwaters are at 37°29′09″N 92°49′42″W and the confluence with the Osage Fork is at 37°28′48″N 92°42′44″W.

Panther Creek was named for the panthers which once roamed its course.

== See also ==
- List of rivers of Missouri
