= Bandai Museum =

Museum in Japan

Coordinates: 36.465454°N 139.838318°E

Bandai Museum of Toy Town
- おもちゃのまちバンダイミュージアム

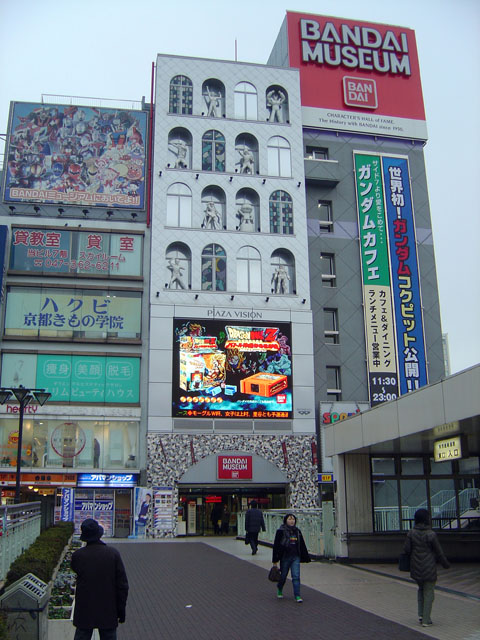
- Former location in Matsudo
- Established: 19 July 2003
- Location: Mibu, Shimotsuga District, Tochigi, Japan
- Type: Toy museum
- Collection size: 30,000
- Owner: Bandai
- Website: www.bandai-museum.jp

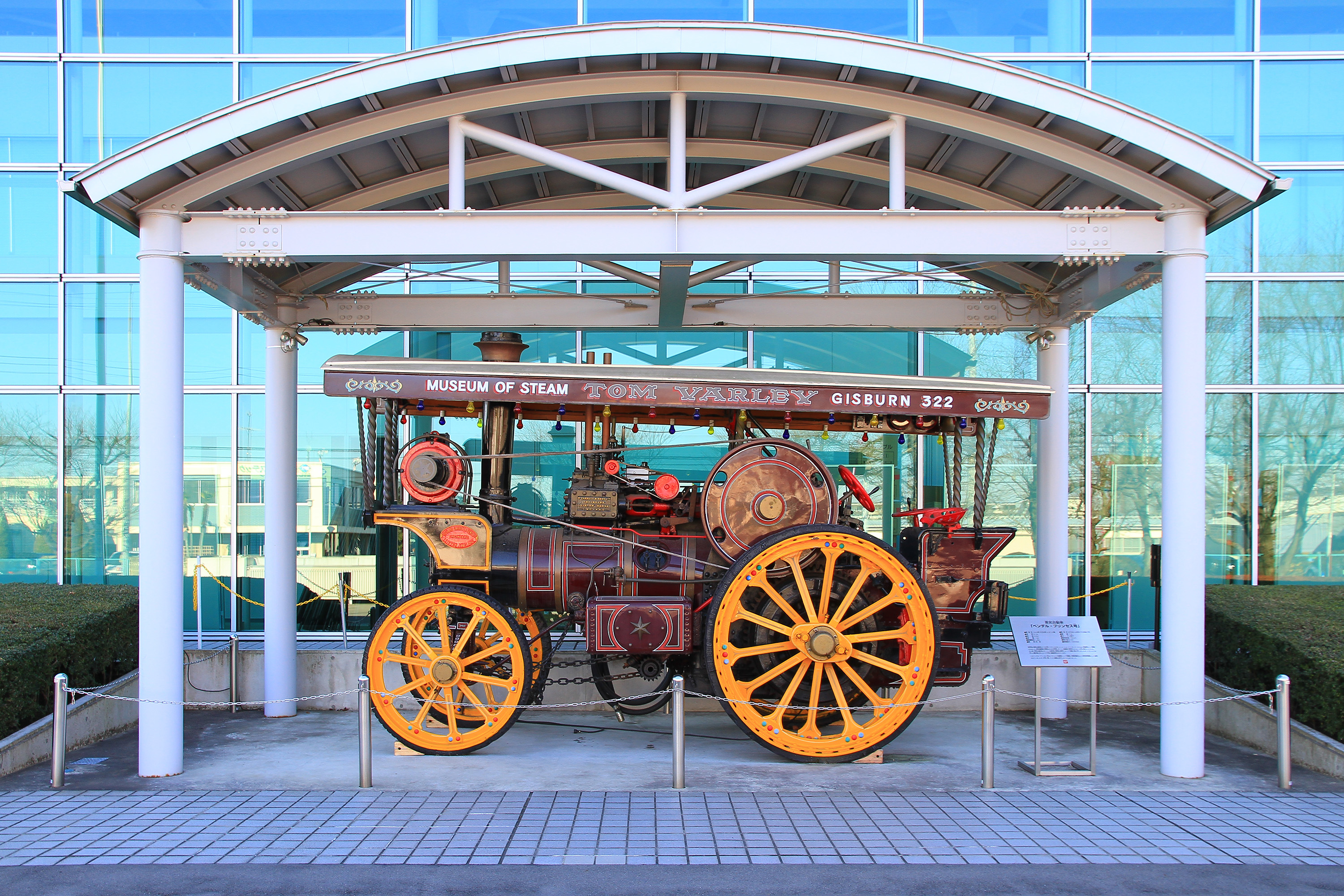
1919 Garrett Showman's Traction Engine

Bandai Museum of Toy Town (Note: Japanese: おもちゃのまちバンダイミュージアム, Hepburn: Omocha no Machi Bandai Myūjiamu) is a museum devoted to Bandai characters located in Mibu, Shimotsuga District, Tochigi, Japan. It opened on July 19, 2003 as the Bandai Museum at Matsudo, Chiba. It was closed on August 31, 2006 and moved to Mibu, Tochigi on April 28, 2007, where it features exhibits on Ultraman, Gundam, Godzilla, Super Sentai, and a Gundam-themed cafe along with various shops attached to the museum.

== History ==
The Bandai Museum was in a 9-story building (1 basement floor) with the museum proper located between floors 5 through 8. The entrance to the museum was located on the third floor on the same level with the Matsudo station of the Joban Line. The exhibit sections of the museum consists of two parts, Character World and Gundam Museum; while the remaining areas of floors 5 through 8 are for shops, event space, and visitor amenities.

By November 2004, the Bandai Museum had reached 1 million visitors.

The museum closed on August 31, 2006. Bandai expressed its apologies and thanked all the visitors that visited the museum in the previous three years. On April 28, 2007, the Omocha no Machi Bandai Museum in Mibu, Tochigi opened for business.

== Gundam Museum ==
The Gundam Museum spans half of the seventh floor and half of the eighth floor and features exhibits mainly from the Universal Century timeline of the Gundam franchise and have three distinct sections: Colony Exhibit, Zaku Exhibit, and a Gundam Exhibit. The museum has three interactive exhibits in which a visitor may use and experience, the Gundam Lift, the Zeta Gundam Cockpit, and the Gundam Rifle Firing Range. The entrance of the museum and each of the interactive exhibits requires an admission fee.

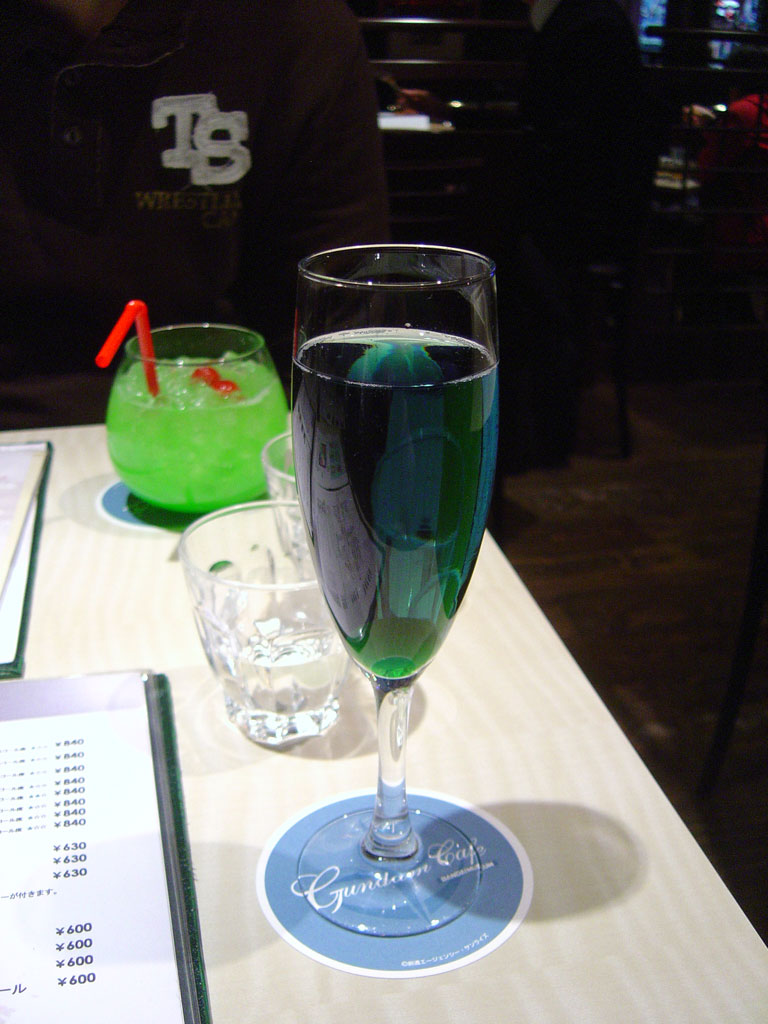
Athrun Zala mixed cocktail (front), with the Haro mixed beverage (back)

=== Gundam Cafe ===
The Gundam Cafe opened since the opening of the Bandai Museum on July 19, 2003. Located on the top floor after the Gundam merchandise shop, G-Base, the Gundam Cafe served many Gundam themed mixed drinks and foods such as the 'Atmospheric Entry', a mildly spicy drink; to an 'Ace Pilot', a sushi salad dish. Party catering sets were also available to those whom wish to hold a party at the Gundam Cafe. The Gundam Cafe closed on January 15, 2006 with its last 'Final Shoot' party before their closure.

=== G Style Cafe ===
The G Style Cafe opened and replaced the Gundam Cafe on February 25, 2006. Located exactly where the Gundam Cafe was located, the G Style Cafe featured a wider theme encompassing the different series in its decor through the addition of Gundam SEED, Zeta Gundam, and the original Gundam private rooms. The changed cafe menu is a bit more focused on the recent Gundam SEED Cosmic Era timeline, with drinks such as Sword of Justice (Seigi no Ken 正義の剣), an Athrun Zala drink; Wings of Freedom (Jiyuu no Tsubasa 自由の翼), a Kira Yamato drink; and Princess of Orb (Oobu no Hime Kun オーブの姫君), a Cagalli Yula Athha drink. However, the menu still retains some of the other series with items like Char's Custom Zaku Omelette-rice (Shaa Senyuu Zaku Omuraisu シャア専用 ザク オムライス) an omelette rice food item shaped and decorated like a Zaku head; and Lalah's Eyes (Raraa no Hitomi ララーの瞳), a Lalah alcoholic drink.

=== G-Base ===
The 1/1 G-Base is a store located at the exit of the Gundam Museum, though a part of the full museum, the store sells mainly premium Gundam items like collectables and figures, but also limited and exclusive items that are only available to the museum store.

== Character World ==
The Character World spans the remaining half of the seventh floor, usable space unoccupied by the Gundam Museum, and some parts of the sixth floor, featuring various exhibit displays from series like Ultraman, Mazinger, Kamen Rider, Godzilla, and various anime and Super Sentai series. There is an admission charge for the Character World area.

== Collection ==
- Model Coal Mine built 19th century
- Tin Toy Bing, Bassett-Lowke, Georges Carette, etc.
- Thomas Edison Gallery:Phonograph, light bulb, etc
