= Pink Panther (disambiguation) =

The Pink Panther is a media franchise originating with series of films featuring the fictional Inspector Clouseau, played by Peter Sellers, that began in 1963.

Pink Panther may also refer to:

== People ==
- Paula Creamer (born 1986), an American professional golfer nicknamed "The Pink Panther"
- Zoe Jones (darts player), an English women's professional darts player nicknamed "The Pink Panther"
- Jim Rock, an Irish professional boxer nicknamed "The Pink Panther"

== Arts, media, and entertainment ==
=== Fictional elements ===
- Pink Panther (character), main and title character in a series of animated short films, originally appearing in the 1963 film

=== Films ===
- The Pink Panther (1963 film), starring David Niven, and Peter Sellers as Inspector Clouseau
- The Pink Panther (2006 film), series reboot, starring Steve Martin as Clouseau and Kevin Kline as Dreyfus
- The Pink Panther 2, 2009 film, the sequel to the 2006 film, starring Martin and John Cleese as Dreyfus

=== Music ===
- "The Pink Panther Theme", theme for the Pink Panther films and animated shorts, written by Henry Mancini
- The Pink Panther: Music from the Film Score Composed and Conducted by Henry Mancini, soundtrack album of the 1964 Pink Panther film
- The Pink Panther (2006 soundtrack), soundtrack album of the 2006 Pink Panther film

=== Television ===
- The Pink Panther Show (1969 TV series), a television series of Pink Panther cartoons
- The Pink Panther (TV series) (1993 TV series), animated television series

=== Sculptures ===
- Pink Panther (sculpture), from the Jeff Koons series Banality

== Organizations ==
- Pink Panthers (advocacy group), a name used by different gay rights organizations in North America and worldwide since the 1970s
- Pink Panthers (organized crime group), a name given to an international jewel thief network by Interpol

== Other uses ==
- Jaipur Pink Panthers, an Indian Kabaddi team in the Pro Kabaddi League
- There is a kind of pink wafer with Pink Panther branding

== See also ==
- List of The Pink Panther cartoons
- Passport to Peril, a point-and-click video game featuring the Pink Panther cartoon character
- PinkPantheress (born 2001), a British singer
- Pink Punch, album
- Pink Punters, nightclub
- Land Rover, painted with pink camouflage for desert operations
