= Black Panther (video game) =

1985 video game

- Arcade flyer
- Developer: Konami
- Publisher: Konami
- Platform: Arcade
- Release: June 1987
- Genre: Beat 'em up
- Modes: Single player, multiplayer

Black Panther (ブラックパンサー ) is a 1987 beat 'em up game developed and published by Konami for arcades. The player controls a cybernetic black panther cat who has to save the Earth by clawing, jumping, and shooting at enemies, collecting power-ups, and defeating bosses to advance levels.

Gameplay screenshot
