= Panther Creek (Osage River tributary) =

Stream in the American state of Missouri

Panther Creek is a stream in Bates and Henry counties of west central Missouri. It is a tributary of Osage River.

The stream headwaters are located at 38°13′22″N 94°03′06″W and the confluence with the Osage is at 38°02′53″N 94°06′11″W.

Panther Creek was named for the animal.

== See also ==
- List of rivers of Missouri
