= Panther Creek (East Fork Grand River tributary) =

Stream in the American state of Missouri

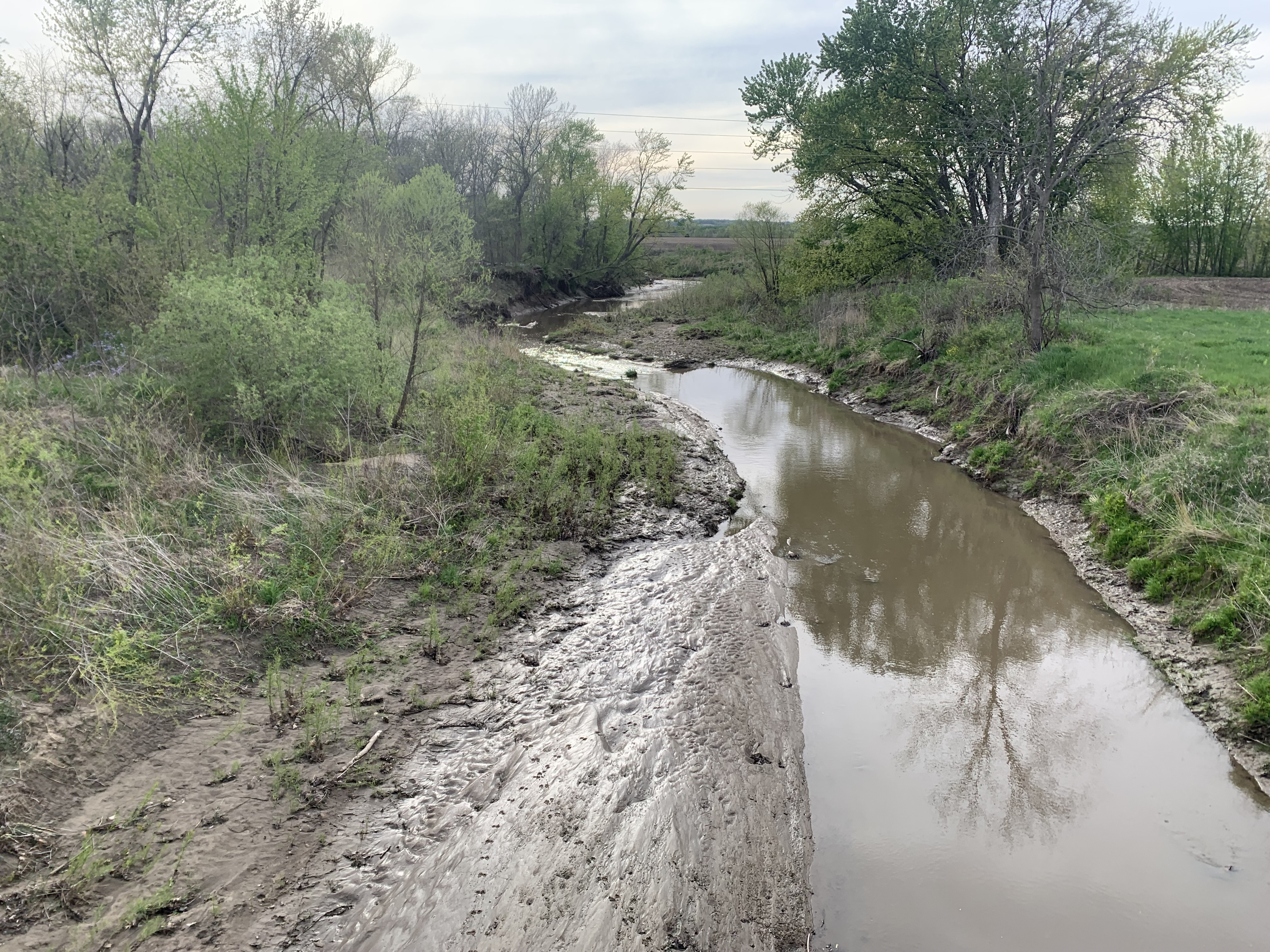
Panther Creek at Route C bridge in Howard Township

Panther Creek is a stream in Gentry and Harrison counties of northern Missouri. It is a tributary of the East Fork Grand River.

The stream headwaters in Harrison County are located at 40°23′33″N 94°09′09″W and the confluence with the East Fork is at 40°18′06″N 94°20′52″W.

According to tradition, Panther Creek was so named on account of some pioneers encountering panthers along its course.

== See also ==
- List of rivers of Missouri
