= The Panther (Sam Brushell) =

The Panther was a Mohegan Indian who lived in the Town of Richfield in Otsego County, New York in the beginning to mid 1800s. He was the son of an Indian named Captain John.

== Biography ==
Brushell's father was known as Captain John; they had a wigwam for a time built on Tunnicliff land near a lake. After his father's death he moved back to the Connecticut Valley where he and his father had moved from. He remained there a few years and then returned to the grave of his father, and build a Wigwam on the Chamberlin Farm in the Town of Richfield.

The Panther was a peaceful Indian who would frequently give bows and arrows to children. He took the liberty to cut timber on any property when he wanted, regarding it as his right as a native of the forest. He also believed that where he left his possessions, that they should be safe from trespassers. On one occasion he followed two people who rode his canoe to Deowongo Island, beat them both with the paddles, and left them stranded on the island to get off the best way they could. And another time Mr. Olcott Chamberlin, son of Freedom Chamberlain, took The Panther's boat at night with a torch to fish along shore. As he was sailing along shore he heard a voice say "come, shore my boat" which he ignored. The Panther then shot above the boat which persuaded Mr. Chamberlin to come to shore.

The Panther left on a normal visit to Connecticut around 1846 and did not return to Otsego County.

== Legacy ==
- There is a mountain in Otsego County, New York named after him called Panther Mountain.
