= Panther, Daviess County, Kentucky =

Unincorporated community in Kentucky, United States

Panther
- Census-designated place
- Location within the state of Kentucky Panther (the United States)
- Coordinates: 37°38′24″N 87°13′30″W
- Country: United States
- State: Kentucky
- County: Daviess

Area
  - Total: 0.80 sq mi (2.07 km^{2})
  - Land: 0.79 sq mi (2.05 km^{2})
  - Water: 0.0077 sq mi (0.02 km^{2})
- Elevation: 459 ft (140 m)

Population (2020)
  - Total: 144
  - Density: 182.1/sq mi (70.32/km^{2})
- Time zone: UTC-6 (Central (CST))
  - Summer (DST): UTC-5 (CST)
- FIPS code: 21-59124
- GNIS feature ID: 500148

Panther is a census-designated place and unincorporated community located in western Daviess County, Kentucky, United States. The population was 144 as of the 2020 census. It is home of Brushy Fork Baptist Church and the Leet's store. It is near the former location of Green Coal Company.

== Demographics ==
Historical population
Census	Pop.	Note	%±
2020	144		—
U.S. Decennial Census

== History ==
The town is named for Panther Creek, which received its name after surveyors working for Colonel George Mason of Virginia saw a large animal on the banks of the Green River. The post office was established on May 12, 1881, in a general merchandise store owned by John P. Burns. An earlier version of the Panther Creek post office was established on Panther Creek in 1830. It was renamed Howardsville in 1839 and discontinued in 1843.
