= Medabots: Metabee and Rokusho =

- Box art depicting the Medabot Metabee
- Developer: Natsume Co., Ltd.
- Publishers: JP: Natsume Co., Ltd.; NA/EU: Natsume Inc.; JP: Rocket Company (VC)
- Platform: Game Boy Advance
- Release: JP: December 25, 2002 (Comic BomBom); EU: November 22, 2002; NA: March 31, 2003; JP: April 18, 2003
- Genre: Role-playing
- Modes: Single-player, multiplayer

Medabots: Metabee and Medabots: Rokusho (メダロット弐CORE クワガタバージョン・カブトバージョン, Medarotto Ni CORE Kabuto Bājon · Kuwagata Bājon) is a set of two 2D top-down role-playing video games in the Medabots series, developed by Natsume Co., Ltd. for Game Boy Advance. It is a remake of the Japan-exclusive title Medarot 2 (メダロット２, Medarotto 2), which was released for the Game Boy Color in 1999. It was later re-released on the Wii U Virtual Console on October 1, 2015 in Europe, on December 10, 2015 for North America, and on January 27, 2016 in Japan.

Medabots is one of only three games in the series to be released outside Japan, the other two being Medabots AX and Medabots Infinity.

== Plot ==
Ikki Tenryou is a young boy who is obsessed with Medabots, just like every other kid; however, he does not have one yet. One day, his mother Chidori asks him to buy some dinner, but instead he gets talked into buying a Medabot instead with the money. However, it turns out it is missing a medal, a vital part to make a Medabot work. However, a strange mysterious man called the Phantom Renegade gives a medal to Ikki's father Jouzou and tells him he should give it to his son. Now Ikki will finally be able to also take part in Robattles and compete with other fellow Medafighters. But whoever loses the battle must submit one of their Medabot's Medaparts to the victor.

== Gameplay ==
Gameplay is split into two different sections. One for the World Map, and another for Battles. When travelling around the World Map the player can find random encounters with other Medafighters. When encountering another Medafighter; it is set in a 3-v-3 Battle with a unique battle system, with each Medabot having four different actions (Head parts have a finite amount of ammo, the Medabot will cease to function once its head is destroyed. R.Arm and L.Arm parts have infinite amount of ammo and can be used repeatedly until destroyed. Legs can affect the movement of player's Medabot based on the terrain within a battle and build up the Medaforce meter). The way to act in battle is different compared to other RPGs, targeting a certain Medabot part and Medabot is usually randomized but can be avoided by using certain Medaparts that aim at certain parts, and the speed of player's Medabot is dependent on the Leg Medaparts it has and the terrain it is battling on. The battle is over when the "Leader" Medabot's head is destroyed. Some encounters such as the Rubberobo Gang for example; will give the player Rubberobo Medals which are used to escape from battles. The player earns experience points, Medaparts and money by winning battles. They can customize their Medabot with Medaparts, which can be won from other medafighters or bought in shops.

== Reception ==
In 2015, Marcel van Duyn of Nintendo Life gave it a retrospective rating of 6/10.
