= Medabots =

Anime, manga, and video game series

- Genre: RPG
- Developers: Natsume Co., Ltd. Delta Arts; Jupiter Corporation digifloyd
- Publishers: Imagineer; Natsume Co., Ltd. (Some GBA/GC titles); Ubisoft (PAL, GBA/GC titles); Rocket Company (2010-16)
- Platforms: Game Boy, Game Boy Color, WonderSwan, PlayStation, Game Boy Advance, GameCube, Nintendo DS, 3DS, iOS, Android, Switch
- First release: Medarot; November 28, 1997
- Latest release: Medarot Classics Plus; November 12, 2020

Medabots, known in Japan as Medarot (メダロット, Medarotto), is a Japanese role-playing video game franchise created by Rin Horuma (Horumarin) and currently owned by Imagineer. The main series of RPGs focus on collecting and battling with the titular robots. The bulk of the games releases have been on Nintendo platforms, including the Game Boy, GameCube, and the DS, and 3DS handhelds.

The series was adapted into a Japanese anime television series spanning two adaptations. The first was animated by Bee Train while the second, Medarot Damashii, was animated by Production I.G. The television series originally aired on TV Tokyo from July 2, 1999, to March 30, 2001. Both series were originally licensed and localized into English by Nelvana and were broadcast on YTV in Canada and Fox Kids and ABC Family in the United States from 2001 to 2004.

A manga series, written by Rin Horuma, was also produced. It was serialized in the children's magazine Comic BomBom in Japan and then published into collected volumes by Kodansha. The manga based on the first game, Medarot, was never translated into English, but the manga based on the sequel, Medarot 2, was licensed for an English language release in North America by Viz Media, simply under the title Medabots. Medarot 2, 3, and 4, have also been translated into English for distribution in Singapore by Chuang Yi.

To date, only Medabots (a remake of Medarot 2 for Game Boy Advance), Medabots AX, and Medabots Infinity have been released in North America. There have also been plastic models produced by Kotobukiya.

A compilation game, Medarot Classics Plus, was released on November 12, 2020. It features the Kabuto and Kuwagata versions of the first eight mainline games.

== Plot ==
In the future, the Medabots are a type of robot created by Dr. Eugene Aki, Professor Hushi, and Dr. Armond, who engage in Robattles alongside their owners. In submission battles, the loser of the battle must give up one of their Medabots' parts, ranging from their head, one of their arms, or their legs, to the winner of the Robattle.

=== Medabots ===
The series takes place in the future and centers around Medabots, artificially intelligent robots whose purpose is to serve humans. The series begins with Ikki Tenryō, a ten-year-old (nine in the Japanese version) boy who dreams of becoming a champion of the World Robattle Tournament. Ikki cannot afford a Medabot and his parents refuse to buy him one. However, he manages to get enough money to buy an outdated model and finds a medal in a river, which was previously dropped there after the Phantom Renegade thwarted a robbery by members of the Rubberobo Gang. Ikki inserts the medal into the Medabot he purchased, named Metabee. The medal gives Metabee a severe attitude problem, a problem rarely seen in a Medabot, leading Ikki to think that he is defective. However, this theory is proven wrong later in the series, as it is revealed that Metabee actually has a rare medal. Ikki and Metabee fight in Robattles while contending with the Rubberobo Gang and its members Seaslug, Gillgirl, Squidguts, and Shrimplips, who are led by Dr. Armond under the alias Dr. Meta-Evil. In addition, they also encounter the Medabot Rokusho, who was originally owned by Professor Hushi before he was presumed dead in a fire.

The rare medals were kept secret by the mysterious Medabot Corporation. A Medabot with a rare medal would be able to call upon an attack called the "Medaforce". In the manga, the Medaforce is a form of medal mind control, as explained by Dr. Aki in the third graphic novel; in the anime, however, it is shown as a way of increasing the power of a Medabot's special skill into a focused beam attack.

Another important character is Henry, a store clerk who sold Metabee to Ikki and is revealed to be the Phantom Renegade. A running gag in the series was Henry almost revealing he is the Phantom Renegade, but no one ever discovering this fact. Space Medafighter X, another one of Henry's secret identities, is the number one Medafighter in Japan. Later, during the World Finals, he rarely shows up to fights, instead sending substitutes and working behind the scenes. This is because he supposedly started the Ten Days of Darkness, which occurred eight years before the events of the series during the World Robattle Cup when Henry fought as Hikaru Agata with the original Metabee; however, the medal was different. During the Ten Days of Darkness, the Medabots went on a rampage, which stopped when Henry was forced to kill his Medabot by destroying his medal.

At the end of the second season, it is revealed that Victor, a Medafighter for Team Kenya and Warbandit's owner, was helping Dr. Meta-Evil to get medals during the tournament. During the finals, Metabee and Warbandit continue to fight, even with their partners lost and their bodies damaged. During the event, Dr. Meta-Evil starts his plan using Metabee and Warbandit's medals, trapping them in a dream. However, Ikki manages to wake Metabee from the dream, and the other Medabots, now free, help Metabee fight against Dr. Meta-Evil.

Later in the series, Medabots are revealed to be thousands of years old, being remnants of an ancient civilization who called themselves Medalorians. The Medalorians were obsessed with war and, to become more effective warriors, fastened metal armor to themselves. However, their wars decimated the civilization, and the survivors coded their memories onto hexagonal pieces of metal. These "Medals", cloned and mass-produced by the Medabot Corporation founded by Dr. Aki, are the Medabot equivalent of a brain and soul. The original medals, referred to as rare medals, are kept in storage because of the extreme power they have. After Dr. Meta-Evil was defeated, Professor Hushi was revealed to have been saved from aliens as he invites Dr. Meta-Evil with him on a space trip, ultimately resulting in the disbandment of the Rubberobo Gang.

=== Medarot Damashii (Medabots Spirits) ===
Medarot Damashii, a sequel to the original series, takes place some time after the events of the original series and follows Ikki and Metabee as they face a new challenge. Kam Kamazaki, a 12-year-old boy, has designed a new and dangerous type of Medabot: Kilobots (known as Death Medarot in the Japanese version), who use the X-Medal. Kilobots have no feelings, since the emotion part of the Medabot medal has been removed and replaced with more strength parts. They can break the rules in order to win a fight, and the Medaforce is useless against them due to their lack of personality. In the first episode, Ikki loses a Robattle to Ginkai and his Kilobot Desperado when it cheats and reloads. He soon meets Nae, a Medabot mechanic and Dr. Aki's granddaughter, who gives Ikki new medaparts in order to defeat Desperado using a new feature called Action Mode, and later on Demolition Mode is introduced as well. Throughout the season, Ikki, Erika, and their new friend Zuru, who secretly operates as the Mystery Medafighter, battle several of Kam's friends and their Kilobots. The Mystery Medfighter's ambition is to rid the world of Kilobots with the help of his Medabot Roks, who resembles Rokusho. Eventually, Ginkai re-discovers the true spirit of medafighting, defects from Kam's side, and returns to using Medabots. Kam also realizes the error of his ways and stops trying to develop stronger and more dangerous Kilobots following the Kilobot Gryphon's defeat, choosing to remain with his Kilobot Blackbettle, who has a personality installed into her X-Medal.

The sequel is often criticized for dropping several supporting characters such as Henry/Hikaru Agata/Phantom Renegade/Space Medafighter X and Arcbeetle, Rokusho, Koji and Sumilidon, Rintaro and Kantaroth, Karin and Neutranurse, Victor and Warbandit, Mr. Referee, the Rubberobo Gang, and the Chick Salesman, as well as the fact that many of the new Kilobots and Medabots are modified versions of the original series without relation to the original characters: Roks (Rokusho), Exor (Sumilidon), Arcdash (Arcbeetle), and Unitrix (Warbandit).

== Characters ==
=== Main characters ===
Ikki Tenryou (天領イッキ, Tenryō Ikki)
Voiced by: Michiru Yamazaki (Japanese); Samantha Reynolds (original series), Julie Lemieux (Medabot Spirits) (English)
Ikki Tenryou is a lively and easygoing boy, although somewhat timid, and is one of the main protagonists of the series. At first, Ikki is unable to afford a Medabot. After finding a medal in a river, he manages to buy a model, which is named Metabee. However, the medal he found appears to be defective, as Metabee is short-tempered and disobedient. Despite this, a strong bond grows between them after several Robattles. Though Ikki is not a full-fledged Medafighter, he gradually matures through the Robattles he engages in.
Metabee (メタビー, Metabī)
Voiced by: Junko Takeuchi (Japanese); Joseph Motiki (English)
Metabee is one of the main protagonists of the series, a Medabot belonging to Ikki Tenryou whose name is a portmanteau of Metal Beetle. Metabee is a Hercules beetle-type Medabot, specializing in revolver tactics. He possesses a rare medal that allows him to access the Medaforce. Metabee is known to be a rebellious and arrogant Medabot who often causes problems due to his headstrong personality. He is often sarcastic to his owner Ikki, but Ikki trusts him deeply because of the close bond he shares with him.
Erika Amazake (甘酒 アリカ, Amazake Arika)
Voiced by: Eri Sendai (Japanese); Lisa Yamanaka (original series), Bryn McAuley (Medabots Spirits) (English)
Erika Amazake is a member of the school's journalism club and Ikki's best friend. She is feisty and somewhat bossy, frequently compelling Ikki to cooperate with her investigations. She owns a Sailor-Multi, a sailor-type Medabot she calls Brass.
Sailor-Multi (セーラーマルチ, Sēramaruchi)
Voiced by: Masami Suzuki
Sailor-Multi, also nicknamed Brass, is an SLR-1 model sailor-type Medabot specializing in shooting who is owned by Erika.

=== Supporting characters ===
Karin Junmai (純米 カリン, Junmai Karin)
Voiced by: Maaya Sakamoto (Japanese); Ashley Taylor (English)
Karin Junmai is a gentle girl from a wealthy family and Dr. Aki's grand-niece. She is a love interest for Ikki, which makes Erika jealous, though she and Erika are friendly towards each other. Karin was later dropped after the original series.
Neutranurse (セントナース, Neutranurse)
Voiced by: Noriko Namiki
Neutranurse is a NAS-1 model nurse-type Medabot owned by Karin who specializes in healing.
Koji Karakuchi (辛口 コウジ, Karakuchi Kōji)
Voiced by: Reona Naka (Japanese); Jo Vannicola (English)
Koji Karakuchi is a wealthy boy and expert fencer who is Ikki's rival for Karin's affection. He was originally into insects at a young age until the cocoons he collected hatched into a swarm of mantis in his closet. During the World Robattle Cup, Koji was ranked #2 and represented Team Japan. Koji was later dropped after the original series.
Sumilodon (スミロドナッド, Sumilodon)
Voiced by: Satoshi Tsuruoka
Sumilodon is a stoic STG-0 model sabretooth tiger-type Medabot owned by Koji who specializes in the Shadow Sword.
Samantha (キクヒメ, Kikihimi)
Voiced by: Masami Suzuki (Japanese); Julie Lemieux (English)
Samantha is the leader of the Screws school gang who harasses the other students. Though the strongest and toughest of the bunch, Samantha does have an occasional soft side. During the Medabots Spirit season, Samantha would often help out Ikki or the Rogue Medafights, with the latter reason being for obtaining Kilobot parts, but she often learns the hard way that they are not compatible with normal Medabots. She is confirmed to be ranked no. 87 in terms of Medafighter status.
Peppercat (ペッパーキャット, Peppercat)
Voiced by: Mika Ishibashi
Peppercat is a CAT-1 model cat-type Medabot owned by Samantha who specializes in performing an electric shock. During the Medabots Spirit series, Samantha would try to obtain Kilobot parts from Kam in exchange for favors, only to learn the hard way that Kilobot parts are not compatible with Peppercat.
Spike (イワノイ, Iwanoi)
Voiced by: Shigenori Yamazaki (Japanese); Robert Tinkler (English)
Spike is a member of the Screws school gang and its smartest member, also being the tallest and weakest. He is considered to be the worst Medafighter in Japan, having been ranked in last place.
Cyandog (シアンドッグ, Cyandog)
Voiced by: Kōichi Tateishi (Japanese); Robert Tinkler (English)
Cyandog is a DOG-0 model dog-type Medabot who is Spike's first Medabot. Metabee later discovered that Cyandog has been equipped with a monkey medal that is not compatible with Cyandog's model, as monkey medals are used for Medabots who are experts at hand-to-hand combat while Cyandog was among the Medabots that specialize in shooting. Though Cyandog's body was later destroyed during his fight against Metabee, his medal was placed into Krosserdog.
Krosserdog (ブルースドッグ, Bluesdog)
Voiced by: Kōichi Tateishi (Japanese); Robert Tinkler (English)
Krosserdog is a DOG-1 model dog-type Medabot who is Spike's second Medabot and resembles an upgraded version of Cyandog. Like his predecessor, Krosserdog specializes in shooting.
Sloan (カガミヤマ, Kagamiyama)
Voiced by: Yoshiko Iseki (Japanese); Darren Frost (English)
Sloan is a member of the Screws school gang and its strongest member.
Totalizer (キースタートル, Totalizer)
Voiced by: Masaru Hotta
Totalizer is a TOT-1 model tortoise-type Medabot who is Sloan's Medabot and specializes in a laser beam attack. Unlike the other Medabots owned by the Screws, Totalizer is not much of a talker.
Hikaru Agata (あがた ヒカル, Agata Hikaru)
Voiced by: Ryo Naito (Japanese); Jamie Watson (English)
Hikaru Agata is a famous Medafighter who is currently operating as a Hop-Mart clerk; in the English version, he goes by the name Henry as a clerk. He has two masked aliases. As the Phantom Renegade (快盗レトルト, Kaitou Retoruto), he uses this alias to target rare medals for Dr. Aki to prevent a repeat of the Ten Days of Darkness and occasionally helps Ikki out when dealing with the Rubberobo Gang. As Space Medafighter X (宇宙メダロッターX, Uchū Medarottā Ekkusu), he is a top Medafighter who was said to have caused the Ten Days of Darkness when his Metabee went berserk and caused the other Medabots to go berserk as well. Henry was later dropped after the original series.
Arcbeetle (アークビートル, Arcbeetle)
Arcbeetle is a KBT-4 model Hercules beetle-type Medabot who is Space Medafighter X's Medabot and specializes in shooting fireballs.
Mr. Referee (ミスターうるち, Mr. Uruchi)
Voiced by: Hiroshi Shimizu (Japanese); Denis Akiyama (English)
Mr. Referee is a Medabot referee who pops up to referee the Robattles and enforce the rules. On occasion, Mr. Referee will pop up to mention important Robattle information. As seen in "Space Superstars", Mr. Referee is shown to call on the actions of Terakado, which resemble Wire-Ninjas with satellite parts for legs, to fire a sleeping dart on Medafighters who break the laws. During the World Robattle Cup, Mr. Referee was manipulated by the Rubberobo Gang posing as World Robattle Cup officials to make the losing team give their medals to the winning team. When this ruse was discovered, Mr. Referee fled. Thanks to a pep talk from the Chick Salesman, Mr. Referee officiated the final battle against Dr. Meta-Evil. Mr. Referee was later dropped after the original series.
Rokusho (ロクショウ, Rokushou)
Voiced by: Isao Shinohara (Japanese); Mark Dailey (English)
Rokusho is KWG-1 model stag beetle-type Medabot who specializes in sword and speed and allies with Ikki's group. He was originally owned by Professor Hushi, who was thought to have perished in a fire caused by the Rubberobo Gang. Rokusho once thought that Dr. Aki was responsible for the fire until the truth was revealed. Following the defeat of the giant Babbyblu piloted by Dr. Meta-Evil, Rokusho learns that Professor Hushi was saved by some aliens and is told by Professor Hushi that he will be away for some time. Rokusho was later dropped after the original series.
Dr. Eugene Aki (アキハバラ アトム, Akihabara Atom)
Voiced by: Ron Pardo
Dr. Eugene Aki is a scientist who was one of the inventors of the Medabots and works at the Medabot Corporation. He is also the great-uncle of Karin and grandfather of Nae.
Rintaro Namishima (波島りんたろう, Namishima Rintarō)
Voiced by: Chieko Higuchi (Japanese); Jacqueline Pillon (English)
Rintaro Namishima is a fast-paced Medafighter who befriends Ikki and is a fan of Hikaru Agata. The character was dropped after the original series.
Kantaroth (カンタロス, Kantaros)
Voiced by: Takayuki Kondo
Kantaroth is a KBT-3 model Hercules beetle-type Medabot owned by Rintaro Namaishima who resembles Metabee and specializes in shooting.
Nae Aki (アキハバラ ナエ, Akihabara Nae)
Voiced by: Risa Mizuno (Japanese); Ashley Taylor (English)
Nae Aki is the granddaughter of Dr. Aki who appears in the Medabots Spirit anime. Originally working as a scientist, she has since become a Medabot mechanic.
Honey (ハニー, Honey)
Voiced by: Mayumi Shintani
Honey is Nae's assistant-type Medabot that specializes in helping.
Tak (タテヤマ, Tateyama)
Voiced by: Akira Nakagawa (Japanese); Krista White (English)
Tak is a young boy in Medabots Spirit who Ikki mentors, as he is known to lose all of his Robattles.
Komandog (コーマドッグ, Comadog)
Komandog is Tak's COM-0 model guard dog-type Medabot who specializes in traveling.
Ginkai (ギンカイ, Ginkai)
Voiced by: Eiji Takemoto (Japanese); Phil McCordic (English)
Ginkai is a burly kid. He used to own the Hercules beetle-type Medabot Bayonet, but became annoyed with his smart alec personality, which was similar to Metabee. He buried Bayonet's medal and gave Bayonet to his cousin. When allied with Kam Kamizaki, he made use of different Kilobots, including the machine pistol-type Kilobot Desperado, (Note: The Medabot Vital Status in the English dub listed Desperado as a hammer-type Kilobot.) Robin Hood-type Kilobot Sherwood, submarine-type Kilobot Locknex, sword-type Kilobot Cutter, and king lion-type Kilobot Unitrix. After Ginkai defected from Kam's side, he recovered Bayonet's medal and placed it in Arcbeetle Dash while making amends with him. Ginkai has since helped Ikki to fight the Kilobots and helped out in the final battle against Kam and Gryphon.
Arcbeetle Dash (アークビートル・ダッシュ, Arcbeetle Dash)
Voiced by: Naomi Matamura
A Hercules beetle-type Medabot that resembles Arcbeetle. After Ginkai defected from Kam's side and dug up Bayonet's medal, he placed it in Arcbeetle Dash.
Zuru Zora (大空ユウヅル, Oozora Yuuzuru)
Voiced by: Naomi Wakabayash (Japanese); Jeff Berg (English)
Zuru Zora is a mild-mannered boy in Medabots Spirit who has a vendetta against Kilobots because his father makes Kilobots for Kam and those that make use of them. To hide it, he assumes the alias of the Mystery Medafighter (謎のメダロッター, Mystery Medarotter) while removing his glasses and wearing a cap and a cape. Nae Aki later learned the truth about Zuru's dual life. Near the final episode, Zuru reveals his true identity to his friends and Kam when saving Ginkai and Arcbeetle Dash.
Gorem-2 (ドンドグー, Dondogū)
Gorem-2 is Zuru's DGU-0 model clay model-type Medabot when in his civilian form.
Roks (ドークス, Dorcus)
Voiced by: Daisuke Fukagai (Japanese); Mark Dailey (English)
Roks is a KWG-3 model stag beetle-type Medabot that resembles Rokusho, possessing the same sword and speed ability, and is used by Zuru in his Mystery Medafighter alias.
Tyrelbeetle (ティレルビートル, Tyrellbeetle)
Voiced by: Misami Iwasaki (Japanese); Ron Pardo (English)
Tyrelbeetle is a KWG-6 model stag beetle-type Medabot who is the second Medabot owned by Zuru in his Mystery Medafighter alias and specializes in grappling horns. Zuru uses Gorem-2's medal to run it.

=== Villains ===
==== Rubberobo Gang ====
The Rubberobo Gang (ロボロボ団, Roborobo Dan) are a group of thieves who serve as the primary antagonists of the first series. They often target rare medals and get their name from their rubber suits. In addition to a substantial number of generic Rubberobo Gang grunts, the following are the known members of the Rubberobo Gang.

Dr. Armond (ヘベレケ博士, Hebereke Hakase)
Voiced by: Ren Tamura (Japanese); Terry McGurrin (English)
Dr. Armond, known by his alias of Dr. Meta-Evil, is a scientist-turned-mad scientist who is the official leader of the Rubberobo Gang. He once helped Dr. Aki and Professor Hushi in the creation of the Medabots. When Dr. Meta-Evil made himself known to the Rubberobo Gang, they try to steal medals that they think are real, only to be told by Dr. Meta-Evil that the medals are not rare. In later episodes, Dr. Meta-Evil had each of the Rubberobo Gang members act as leader should the one he appoint to that position fail him. Following their failure to defeat Metabee, Dr. Meta-Evil dispatched the weapon-type Medabot Mega-Emperor to help capture Metabee. When Ikki and his allies were rescuing Metabee from a Rubberobo Gang, they encountered a cyborg copy of Dr. Meta-Evil who utilized different Medaparts like Robo-Emperor and Stingray's right arms, Spidar and Phoenix's left arms, Megaphant's left shield, and Phoenix's legs. After Michael deactivated the Dr. Meta-Evil clone by ejecting its medal upon its failure, he placed it in a giant-size Giganko. During the World Robattle Cup, Dr. Meta-Evil and the Rubberobo Gang manipulated Mr. Referee into making the losing team give up their medal. When this was revealed, Dr. Meta-Evil and Dr. Aki ended up in heated argument before Dr. Meta-Evil escaped into a giant-size Babbyblu. When the Babbyblu was defeated by Giant Metabee, Dr. Meta-Evil was then approached by Professor Hushi and the aliens that rescued him, stating that the Medabots do not want to rule humanity. Dr. Meta-Evil then takes Professor Hushi's offer to travel into outer space with him.
Michael (マイケル, Maikeru)
Michael is the pet cat of Dr. Meta-Evil in a cybernetic helmet, whose medal has the memories tied to the past of the Medalorians. After Michael deactivated the Dr. Meta-Evil clone by ejecting its medal upon its failure, he placed it in a giant-size Giganko. Michael was later seen by Dr. Meta-Evil's side when it is revealed that the Rubberobo Gang manipulated the World Robattle Cup. After the giant Babbyblu was defeated by Giant Metabee, Michael thanked Dr. Meta-Evil for his services, ejected the medal out of his helmet, and resumed his life as a normal cat.
Seaslug (サケカース, Sakekāsu)
Voiced by: Misami Iwasaki (Japanese); Robert Tinkler (English)
Seaslug is the unofficial leader of the Rubberobo Gang in its earlier appearances, who sports a dimwitted and immature personality. His true name is (Seamore Slugbottoms; Sakenosuke Kasukabe). While usually the one who handles the different Medabots used in the Rubberobo Gang's plots, Seaslug would lead them in plots like passing themselves off as aliens with help from clay model-type Medabot Gorem, causing ghost sightings with help from the ghost-type Medabot Mistyghost, placing Metabee's displaced medal into the tanuki-type Medabot Agadema, (Note: The Medabot Vital Stats in the English dub listed Agadema as a raccoon-type Medabot.) doing home renovations with help from fox-type Medabot Foxuno, operating as a rebellious rock and roll band with the car-type Medabots Landmotors serving as transportation in their car modes, forming a penguin-only zoo while using the marine-type Medabot Aquamar to help reclaim them, taking control of Ninja Park's ninja and kunoichi-themed Medabots Nin-Ninja and Icknite with different medals, raiding a property with salamander-type Medabot Saldron, and crashing an event at Rosewood Private School with mantis-type Medabot Mantaprey. When Dr. Meta-Evil revealed himself to the Rubberobo Gang, Seaslug partook in going after Medabots that have rare medals. At one point, Seaslug infiltrated the Medabot Corporation under the alias of Mr. Tunahead assuming that its Belzelga had a rare medal and fell for a worker named Miss Caviar. He lost interest after seeing her with another person, which led to a misunderstanding. Other rare medal hunts involved using the dragonfly-type Medabot Drakonfly to keep Ikki and Metabee from rescuing Femjet and using the weapon-type Medabot Robo-Emperor to attack Rokusho where the Rubberobo Gang were unable to get it out. Dr. Meta-Evil later paired Seaslug with Whitesword. Following Dr. Meta-Evil's defeat and the Rubberobo Gang disbanding, Miss Caviar cleared things up with Seaslug and they started a supervillain consulting agency.
Whitesword (シンセイバー, Shinsaber)
A Shinsengumi-type Medabot (Note: The Medabot Vital Stats in the English dub listed Whitesword as a samurai-type Medabot.) that Dr. Meta-Evil gave Seaslug. Whitesword specializes in sword attacks.
Gillgirl (スルメ, Surume)
Voiced by: Noriko Namiki
Gillgirl is a member of the Rubberobo Gang. Her true name is Gilda Girlnikova (タカス ルミ, Takasu Rumi). Dr. Meta-Evil later paired her up with Seagaru. Gillgirl showed off her ruthless side in "Dude, Where's My Ma", where she kidnaps Ikki's mother in order to challenge him to a Robattle against Seagaru and Spiritus.
Seagaru (シーガル, Seagaru)
Seagaru is a Chinese dragon-type Medabot (Note: The Medabot Vital Stats in the English dub listed Seagaru as a dragon-type Medabot.) that Dr. Meta-Evil gave Gillgirl. Seagaru specializes in laser beams.
Spiritus (スプライトゥス, Sprytooth)
Spiritus is a tiger-themed Medabot owned by Gillgirl that assisted Seagaru in its Robattle against Ikki and Metabee. Its specialty is hand combat.
Squidguts (シオカラ, Shiokara)
Voiced by: Harii Kineo (Japanese); Terry McGurrin (English)
Squidguts is a member of the Rubberobo Gang and the largest of the group who is not very bright. His true name is Guido Guttaluchi (シオカ ライゾウ, Shioka Raizou). Dr. Meta-Evil later paired him up with Gobanko.
Gobanko (ゴーベンケー, Gobenkei)
Voiced by: Masayuki Kiyama
Gobanko is a Benkei-type Medabot (Note: The Medabot Vital Stats in the English dub listed Gobanko as a samurai-type Medabot.) that Dr. Meta-Evil gave Squidguts. He specializes in claw attacks.
Shrimplips (サラミ, Sarami)
Voiced by: Kazuhiro Shindō
Shrimplips is a member of the Rubberobo Gang. He is the youngest, smallest, and more level-headed of the group, and, unlike the other three members, was already aware of Dr. Meta-Evil being their leader. When Dr. Meta-Evil revealed himself to the Rubberobo Gang, Shrimplips partook in going after Medabots that have rare medals starting with Neutranuse with help from the spider-type Medabot Spidar. However, Metabee managed to defeat them because Gillgirl left Spidar's Robattle parts back at their hideout, not expecting them to be in a Robattle. His true name is Shrimpy Lippowitz (サラ ミツオ, Sara Mitsuo). Dr. Meta-Evil later paired him up with Gokudo.
Gokudo (ゴクード, Gokūdo)
Gokudo is a Sun Wukong-type Medabot (Note: The Medabot Vital Status in the English dub listed Gokudo as a Gokudo-type Medabot.) that Dr. Meta-Evil gave Shrimplips. He specializes in stretch punch attacks.
Sir Gold (サーゴード, Sāgōdo)
Sir Gold is a Sha Wujing-type Medabot that Shrimplips had assist Gokudo in fighting Ikki.
Hakado (ハッカード, Hakkādo)
Hakado is a Zhu Bajie-type Medabot that Shrimplips had assist Gokudo in fighting Ikki.
Noctobats (ゴーフバレット, Noctobats)
The Noctobats are BAT-1 model bat-type Medabots that serve as the Medabot foot soldiers of the Rubberobo Gang. They have been used in "Spaceship Superstars" when operating the fake UFO, "For Better or Worse" Pt. II when fighting the Screws, and "Ban All Medabots" when attacking Riverview Junior High.

==== Rogue Medafighters ====
The Rogue Medafighters are Medafighters in Medabots Spirits who make use of Kilobots, leading them to run afoul of Ikki's group and the Mystery Medafighter. The following are known Kilbot Medafighters:

Kam Kamazaki (コクリュウ, Kokuryuu Kamazaki)
Voiced by: Yumi Kakazu (Japanese); Caroline Lesley (English)
Kam Kamazaki is a young boy who is the primary antagonist of Medabots Spirit. He masks his shy personality with a cold and ruthless one. While having no friends because of his secret shyness and having a father who is busy running Extreme Tech and Bacchus Concern, he uses the promise of Kilobots made by Extreme Tech to have the Rogue Medafighters to "befriend them" and have them do his bidding. Throughout the series, Kam made use of different Kilobots, like the tank-type Kilobot Tankbank, military-type Kilobot Frontline, submarine-type Kilobot Locknex, and sabretooth tiger-type Kilobot Exor (Note: The Medabot Vital Stats in the English dub listed Exor as a tiger-type Medabot.). He later took on Blakbeetle as his partner. Near the end of the series, Kam made use of the archdevil-type Kilobot Gryphon (Note: The Medabot Vital Stats in the English dub listed Gryphon as a super devil-type Kilobot.) with Blakbeetle's Neo Ex-Medal. After Gryphon was defeated, Kam was hospitalized with Eddie and a repaired Blakbeetle by his side. Kam was later taken to Ikki's group by Eddie and he became friends with them.
Blakbeetle (ブラックビートル, Blackbeetle)
Voiced by: Yū Daiki (Japanese); Caroline Lesley (English)
Blakbeetle is a Hercules beetle-type Kilobot owned by Kam Kamizaki who specializes in swift fire attacks. Unlike the other Kilobots, Blakbeetle possesses the Neo Ex-Medal that gives her feelings and is loyal to Kam. Near the end of the series, Kam later used Blakbeetle's medal to power Gryphon. After Gryphon was defeated, Blakbeetle was repaired and stayed by Kam's side at the hospital.
Masa (モモカワ, Momokawa)
Voiced by: Takahiro Hirana (Japanese); Terry McGurrin (English)
Masa is a Rogue Medafighter who is shown to control ten skeleton-type Kilobot Skelbots.
Brat Brothers (テドリガワ三兄弟, Tedorigawa Sankyōdai)
Voiced by: Yumiko Kobayashi
The Brat Brothers are Rogue Medafighter triplets who can be told apart by the rear designs of their suspenders. They make use of the monkey-type Kilobots Hanumonkey.
Suzie (ワカバ, Wakaba)
Voiced by: Mayumi Akado (Japanese); Bryn McAuley (English)
Suzie is a self-centered and temperamental girl who hides her personality behind a sweet personality. While having originally owned the catgirl-type Medabot Puttycat, she was swayed to Kam's side when he gave her the jewel beetle-type Kilobot Ambiguous 2. Suzie would give orders to the other Rogue Medafighters when Kam is not around. In the final episode, Suzie tried to use Puttycat and Ambiguous 2 against Samantha.
Banjo (バンショウ, Banshou)
Voiced by: Hajime Komada (Japanese); Terry McGurrin (English)
Banjo is a Rogue Medafighter and video game fanatic who uses the devil-type Kilobot Redrun. Unlike the other Rogue Medafighters, Banjo works for Kam for the free challenges.
Minitora (ハナビシ, Hanabishi) and Kintora (キントラ, Kintora)
Minitora Voiced by: Yoshinobu Kaneko
Kintora Voiced by: Ayumi Furutami
Minitora and Kintora are a Rogue Medafighter duo, with Minitora being a slim kid and Kintora being a dark-skinned chubby kid. They originally owned Nin-Ninja and Banisher before they traded them for the king lion-type Kilobot Unitrix and the sabretooth tiger-type Kilobot Exor. They often assist Kam on his plans and take orders from Suzie.

=== Other characters ===
Chidori Tenryou (天領チドリ, Tenryō Chidori)
Voiced by: Chisami Suzuki
Chidori Tenryu is the mother of Ikki, who is a housewife. While depicted as being strict in the earlier video games, Chidori has a nicer personality in the anime where Metabee even sucks up to her. In a later episode, she is abducted by Gillgirl, who Ikki fights in a Robattle to secure her release.
Jouzou Tenryou (天領ジョウゾウ, Tenryō Jouzou)
Voiced by: Masanori Tomita
Jouzou Tenryou is the father of Ikki who works as an office worker. When at home, Jouzou Tenryou is often seen reading the newspaper. Later episodes reveal that he is a member of the Select Corps, which Ikki and Chidori are unaware of. As seen in two episodes, Jouzou is shown to fall asleep at the beach.
The Rockers (ロッカーズ, Rockers)
Kikuchiyo Voiced by: Norihisa Mori
TESHHI Voiced by: Yasuhiro Miyata
Ōmen Voiced by: Hidenori Konda
The Rockers are a rock band trio that consists of Kikuchiyo, TESHHI, and Ōmen (Note: The names of the Rockers were revealed in the Japanese end credits.) and specializes in 3 vs. 1 Robattles. Kikuchiyo owns the phoenix-type Medabot Phoenix, while TESHH and Ōmen own devil-type Medabots Blackram. Samantha wanted to join them after they stole a Bombarder from Spike that was equipped to one of the Blackrams. They were defeated by Metabee. In their next appearance, the Rockers rebranded themselves as a heavy metal band and are joined by a runaway Cyandog. They were defeated when Metabee used the Medaforce on the Rockers' Medabots.
Principal (校長, Kōchō)
Voiced by: Eiji Takemoto
The unnamed elderly principal of Riverview Junior High.
Samurai (サムライ, Samurai)
Samurai is a SAM-0 model samurai-type Medabot resembling an armored samurai who is owned by the Principal and specializes in sword attacks. In "Ban All Medabots", Samurai helped Metabee fight the Rubberobo Gang's Landmotors.
Coach Mountain (オトコヤマ, Otokoyama)
Voiced by: Misami Iwasaki (Japanese); Terry McGurrin (English)
The strict gym teacher of Riverview Junior High, who hates Medabots and often punishes students by having them do laps. While he hates Medabots, he ended up getting one while building a park for children. These plans are halted by a group of gangsters, but Ikki and Metabee were able to defeat the lead gangster, enabling Coach Mountain to build a park in his neighborhood. Coach Mountain's next Tobattle involved fighting Squidguts and Gobanko after they defeated the Student Council President and Dr. Bokchoy, only for him to be defeated.
Digmole (ディグモール, Digmole)
Digmole is an MOG-0 mole-type Medabot owned by Coach Mountain who specializes in digging.
Student Council (生徒会, Student Council)
Student Council President Voiced by: Mariko Nagahama
Student Council Vice-President Voiced by: Mika Ishibashi
Student Council Secretary Voiced by: Mizue Nishimori
The Student Council is Riverview Junior High's administrative organization, consisting of an unnamed president, vice-president, and secretary. They were first seen in the first episode where Samantha defeats the Student Council President. The Student Council President enlisted Ikki to defeat Samantha and regain their meeting room. The Student Council later encountered Squidguts and Gobanko at the bridge and refused to let them pass, causing the Student Council President to unsuccessfully try to beat them in a Robattle.
Dr. Bokchoy (ドクタースタディ, Dokutā Sutadi)
Dr. Bokchoy is a BOK-0 model book-type Medabot (Note: While the anime listed Dr. Bokchoy as a book-type Medabot, the Medarot Card Game and Medarot R listed Dr. Bokchoy as a library-type while Medarot DS and the Medarot Ultimate Character Book listed Dr. Bokchoy as a scholar-type) owned by the Student Council President that specializes in the Textbook Punch.
Miss Caviar (カラスミ, Karasumi)
Voiced by: Azusa Nakao
Miss Caviar is an employee at the Medabot Corporation. While posing Mr. Tunahead, Seaslug developed a crush on her, butt after seeing her with another man, resumed his mission and stole Belzelga in hopes that it had a rare medal. After escaping, Miss Caviar still had feelings for him. During the World Robattle Cup, Miss Caviar found out that Dr. Aki and Phantom Renegade were collaborated and convinced them to let her be the latest person to operate as Space Medafighter X. When Dr. Meta-Evil was defeated and left with Professor Hushi and the aliens, Miss Caviar cleared up the misunderstanding during the Rubberobo Gang's disbandment as she and Seaslug opened a supervillain consulting agency under the alias of Ms. Starfish.
Belzelga (ベルゼルガ, Beruzeruga)
Belzelga is a DVL-1 model devil-type Medabot that specializes in punching abilities. While developed by the Medabot Corporation, Miss Caviar was listed as the Medafighter in the English dub. She would later use Belzelga in the match against Team Kenya when she posed as Space Medafighter X.
Select Corps (セレクト隊, Select Corps)
The Select Corps are a defense force that deal with the threat to Medabots. They own dinosaur-type Medabots, including the Pteranodon-type Medabot Air-Ptera (Note: The Medabot Vital Stats in the English dub lists Air-Ptera as a Pterodactyl-type Medabot.), the Tyrannosaurus-type Medabot Attack-Tyrano, and the Brachiosaurus-type Medabot Landbrachio. As mentioned above, Jouzou Tenryou is a known member. The Select Corps were first seen attempting to stop Giganko and attempting to arrest Space Medafighter X after Team Japan's victory over Team USA when it was alleged that Space Medafighter X caused the Ten Days of Darkness.
Henry McKenna (ヘンリー・マッケンナ, Henry McKenna)
Voiced by: Kazuhiko Nishimatsu
The CEO of Extreme Tech that built the Kilobots. Henry did not see the danger that Kilobots would have until Ikki's allies had their showdown with Kam and Gryphon. Afterwards, Henry noted that Kilobots were not safe for kids.
Shin Kamazaki (シンスイ, Shinsui Kamazaki)
Voiced by: Hozumi Gōda
Shin Kamazaki is the father of Kam, who is the Chairman of Extreme Tech and President of Bacchus Concern. As he was too busy for Kam, Shin had his family employees like Eddie watch over him. After some convincing from Nae Aki, Shin regretted not spending time with Kam and learned of his use of Gryphon. Sometime afterwards, Eddie mentioned to Kam that his father cancelled his meeting to spend time with him.
Eddie (ウラガスミ, Urugasami)
Eddie is the steward of the Kamazaki family. He watches over Kam while Shin is away and is loyal to him. A later chat with Nae Aki had him mentioned that he has cared for Kam's wellbeing. After Kam and Gryphon were defeated, Eddie stayed by Kam's side at the hospital and later took him to see Ikki's group.
Maizu Zora (大空マイヅル, Oozora Maizuru)
Voiced by: KONTA
Maizu Zora is the father of Zuru Zora. He is a scientist who built Kilobots for Kam at Extreme Tech and anyone who wanted to make use of them. It is because of Maizu's activities that Zuru became the Mystery Medafighter to destroy the Kilobots and the associated X-Medals after becoming disillusioned by Dr. Aki's limits with Medabots. Maizu later regretted his actions when he later learned of his son's activities and unsuccessfully tried to stop the development of Gryphon.

==== World Robattle Cup competitors ====
Team Kenya (ケニア代表, Kenia Daihyō)
Victor Voiced by: Takahiro Hirano (Ep.10), Masayuki Kiyama (Eps. 40-52)
Warbandit Voiced by: Eiji Takemoto
Team Kenya is represented by Medafighters from Kenya and consists of Victor (ヴィクトル, Vikutoru) and his king lion-type Medabot Warbandit who specializes in shooting, Isbestja (イスベスヤ, Izubesucha) and his rhinoceros-type Medabot Rhinorush who specializes in shooting, and Prauda (プラウダ, Purauda) and his gorilla-type Medabot Goriongo who specializes in diversions. Victor is the World Champion Medafighter, who as a child witnessed the Ten Days of Darkness. Though he takes advantage of the rule involving taking the loser's medals, Warbandit had mentioned to Brass that he dislikes it and is only coerced by some officials, one of them being a disguised Gillgirl. Chidori once had Victor over her house where Victor recalled what happened when the Ten Days of Darkness happened. When Team Japan fought Team Kenya, the competition is fierce until only Metabee and Warbandit are left. When both their Medaforces collide, it brought back memories of the Medalorian civilization. Though Victor's Warbandit was destroyed, with its medal recovered amidst the final battle against Dr. Meta-Evil, Henry was able to give Victor another Warbandit.
Team Caribbean (カリブ代表, Karibu Daihyō)
Captain Gene Voiced by: Tetsuo Komura
Coconut Voiced by: Mika Sakenobe
Captain Gene's Mates Voiced by: Naomi Matamura, Hiroshi Shimozaki
Team Caribbean is represented by a group of pirate-themed Medafighters from the Caribbean and consists of Captain Gene (キャプテン・ジン, Kyaputen Jin), his daughter Coconut (カルア, Karua), and two unnamed underlings (手下, teshita). While Captain Gene owns the pirate captain-type Medabot Piraskull, Coconut and one of his underlings own the pirate-type Pirastar, which can team up with each other. Despite Captain Gene using Coconut to trick them by having her claim that she stole from him and having their Medabots take a dive when charging towards Coconut, Team Japan managed to defeat Team Caribbean as Coconut apologized for her team's actions.
Team France (フランス代表, Furansu Daihyō)
Jean-Luc Beret Voiced by: Shigeru Honma
Team France is represented by the Beret Brothers (ルパン三兄弟, Rupan Sankyōdai; Three Lupin Brothers) from France and consists of Jean-Luc Beret (アレスール・ルパン, Aresūru Rupan) and his thief-type Medabot Monoklar who specializes in shooting, Jean-Paul Beret and his Goemon-type Medabot Kamafive who specializes in fire attacks, and Jean-Guy Beret and his revolver-type Medabot Wildfire who specializes in cannon attacks. They are masters of disguise and cheaters who have been stealing the medals of their opponents, forcing them to forfeit. Thanks to the Phantom Renegade, Team Japan exposed the Beret Brothers' actions as Metabee defeated them with the Medaforce while claiming that they are lousy Medafighters. After consulting with the other referees, Mr. Referee announced that the Beret Brothers have committed a foul, enabling Team Japan to win by default. In addition, he states that the Beret Brothers are banned for life from all official matches in the World Medabot Federation.
Team Mexico (メキシコ代表, Mekishiko Daihyō)
Voiced by: Jin Nishimura, Takeshi Maeda
Team Mexico is represented by the Amigo Brothers (テキーラ三兄弟, Tekīra Sankyōdai) from Mexico, who each own the cactus-type Medabot Sabotina who specializes in shooting. They bested Team Polynesia and managed to defeat some gangsters and their Megaphants on the street, before being defeated by Team Japan.
Team Spain (スペイン代表, Supein Daihyō)
Rolando Voiced by: Kin Fujii
Team Spain is represented by matador-themed Medafighters from Spain led by Rolando (シャモジール, Shamojīru). He once fought Victor in the last World Robattle Cup with his bull-type Medabot Redmatador who specializes in saber attacks and has a centaur-like build. During the next World Robattle Cup, where his teammates have also used Redmatadors, they were wooed by Team Sweden and lost to them.
Team Sweden (スウェーデン代表, Suwēden Daihyō)
Anika Voiced by: Yuki Nakao
Siri Voiced by: Yumiko Suzuki
Margarita Voiced by: Kaori Tagami
Team Sweden is represented by the Stockholm Fire (チャーミング娘, Chāmingu Musume; Charming Girls), an idol group consisting of three beautiful women from Sweden. They consist of Anika (アマレット, Amaretto) and her bunny girl-type Medabot Hopstar who specializes in hand combat, Siri (シェリー, Sherry) and her sailor-type Medabot Sailormate who specializes in shooting, and Margareta (マルガリータ, Margarita) and her magical girl-type Medabot Fossilkat who specializes in wand attacks. The Stockholm Fire used their talents to woo their opponents, like they did when they bested Team Spain. Team Japan struggles against them and Erika discovers they were part of the Rubberobo Gang. After the Phantom Renegade exposed them as males, Metabee defeats them with his seeker missiles.
Team Siberia (シベリア代表, Shiberia Daihyō)
Team Siberia is represented by three Medafighters from Siberia that each own the Mammoth-type Medabot Mammotusk and make use of a Blizzard Formation. They fought Team Kenya and are defeated by Warbandit.
Team Egypt (エジプト代表, Ejiputo Daihyō)
Patra Tawarama Voiced by: Akira Nakagawa
Team Egypt is represented by Ancient Egypt-dressed Medafighters from Egypt. They consist of Patra Tawarama (パトラ・タワラーマ), Al, and Hassan. Patra owns the Cleopatra-type Medabot Cleobattler, while Al and Hassan own the mummy-type Medabots T-Mummy, which can team up with each other. Eight years ago, Patra owned the Egyptian-type Medabot Kingpharaoh and participated in the Forgotten World Cup with Hikaru Agata and Joe Swihan until the Ten Days of Darkness occurred. In the present, Team Egypt faced off against Team Japan where Patra considered Koji the weakest link and not Space Medafighter X, who Spike was masquerading as at the time. After Team Egypt was defeated, Patra stayed to see Joe Swihan and the rest of Team USA face off against Team Japan. Patra later assisted in the final battle against Dr. Meta-Evil and the Rubberobo Gang.
Team Czech (チェコ代表, Cheko Daihyō)
Čapek Voiced by: Nobuyuki Saitō
Team Czech are a team of Medafighters that represent the Czech Republic. They consist of Čapek (チャペック, Chapekku) and his tin toy-themed Medabot Mokusei Dai-Oh, along with two unnamed members that each own the retro-type Medabot R-Robby. Team Czech faced off against Team USA and lost. Though Joe Swihan returned Čapek's medal, it was stolen shortly after by the Rubberobo Gang.
Team USA (アメリカ代表, Amerika Daihyō)
Joe Swihan Voiced by: Masahiro Shibahara
Team USA are a team of Medafighters representing the United States. They consist of Joe Swihan (ジョー・スイハン, Joe Suihan), J-Girl, and Glen. They all own the native-type Medabot Wigwamo which specializes in high speed. Eight years ago, Joe participated in the Forgotten World Cup with Hikaru Agata and Patra Tawarama until the Ten Days of Darkness occurred. In the present, Joe was a spectator to Team Egypt's match against Team Japan and dropped a hint about Space Medafighter X allegedly being the cause of the Ten Days of Darkness. Afterwards, Team USA defeated Team Czech. Though Joe gave Čapek his medal back, it was stolen shortly after by the Rubberobo Gang and Joe went after them. When Karin's Guppy alias was trying to duel Koji with a Robo-Emperor, Joe mistook her as one of the culprits until Space Medafighter X came to her defense. During Team USA's fight with Team Japan, Sumilodon channeled the Medaforce despite not having a rare medal and helped to defeat Team USA. Joe later assisted in the final battle against Dr. Meta-Evil and the Rubberobo Gang.
Team Iceland (アイスランド代表, Aisurando Daihyō)
Belmont Voiced by: Ryōhei Kimura
Orkamar Voiced by: Yūjin Aoki
Heckla Voiced by: Jun'ichi Miura
Batona Voiced by: Takayuki Kondo
Team Iceland is a team of Medafighters from Iceland. They consist of Belmont (ベルモット, Berumotto), Heckla (ヘックラ, Hekkura), and Batona (バトナ, Batona). While Belmont owned the killer whale-type Medabot Orkamar who specializes in shock waves, Heckla and Batona each owned the giant squid-type Medabot Aviking who specialize in tail attacks. Ikki, Metabee, Erika, and Brass befriended them when they dug out a hot spring while asking about their upcoming match with Team Kenya. After Belmont got sick from falling into the cold river, Erika tried to get Victor to have the duel postponed until Belmont recovered, only for him to decline. During the match which had a water stage set up for Team Iceland, the Avikings took down Rhinorush and Goriongo. Because of Belmont's illness, Orkamar was defeated by Warbandit. While in the hospital, Belmont watched as Team Japan faced off against Team Kenya in the finals.

== Media ==
=== Video games ===
Most games in the series come in two versions: Kabuto (lit. Rhinoceros Beetle), in which the player's starting Medabot's design is based on a Japanese rhinoceros beetle (a "KBT type" Medabot), and Kuwagata, in which it is based on a stag beetle ("KWG type"). Differences beyond the starting Medabot also exist, such as which Medabot parts the player is able to collect, and minor story differences. Medarot R, Medabots Infinity, and the Parts Collection games were only titles to not have been released in two versions.

==== Main series ====
The main series entries, except Medabots DS, are all numbered.

Game	Details
Medarot Original release date(s): JP: November 28, 1997	Release years by system: 1997—Game Boy
Medarot Original release date(s): JP: November 28, 1997	Notes: Released in two versions, Medarot Kabuto Version and Medarot Kuwagata Version.; Developed by Natsume Co., Ltd.; Published by Imagineer.
Medarot Perfect Edition Original release date(s): JP: May 4, 1999	Release years by system: 1999—WonderSwan
Medarot Perfect Edition Original release date(s): JP: May 4, 1999	Notes: Released in two versions, Medarot Perfect Edition Kabuto Version and Medarot Kuwagata Version.; Developed by Natsume Co., Ltd.; Published by Imagineer.; Enhanced port of the first game.
Medarot 2 Original release date(s): JP: July 23, 1999	Release years by system: 1999—Game Boy Color
Medarot 2 Original release date(s): JP: July 23, 1999	Notes: Released in two versions, Medarot 2 Kabuto Version and Medarot Kuwagata Version.; Developed by Natsume Co., Ltd.; Published by Imagineer.; Compatible with the original Game Boy.
Medarot 3 Original release date(s): JP: July 23, 2000	Release years by system: 2000—Game Boy Color
Medarot 3 Original release date(s): JP: July 23, 2000	Notes: Released in two versions, Medarot 3 Kabuto Version and Medarot 3 Kuwagata Version.; Developed by Natsume Co., Ltd.; Published by Imagineer.
Medarot 4 Original release date(s): JP: March 23, 2001	Release years by system: 2001—Game Boy Color
Medarot 4 Original release date(s): JP: March 23, 2001	Notes: Released in two versions, Medarot 4 Kabuto Version and Medarot 4 Kuwagata Version.; Developed by Natsume Co., Ltd.; Published by Imagineer.
Medarot 5: Susutake-mura no Tenkōsei Original release date(s): JP: December 14, 2001	Release years by system: 2001—Game Boy Color
Medarot 5: Susutake-mura no Tenkōsei Original release date(s): JP: December 14, 2001	Notes: The Japanese title translates to "Medarot 5: The Transfer Student of Susutake Village".; Released in two versions, Medarot 5: Susutake-mura no Tenkōsei Kabuto Version and Medarot 5: Susutake-mura no Tenkōsei Kuwagata Version.; Developed by Natsume Co., Ltd.; Published by Imagineer.
Medabots Original release date(s): EU: November 22, 2002; JP: December 25, 2002; (Comic BomBom edition): NA: March 31, 2003; JP: April 18, 2003	Release years by system: 2002—Game Boy Advance; 2015—Wii U Virtual Console
Medabots Original release date(s): EU: November 22, 2002; JP: December 25, 2002; (Comic BomBom edition): NA: March 31, 2003; JP: April 18, 2003	Notes: Released in two versions, Medabots: Metabee Version and Medabots: Rokusho Version.; Known in Japan as Medarot 2 CORE Kabuto Version and Medarot 2 CORE Kuwagata Version.; Developed and published by Natsume Co., Ltd.; Remake of Medarot 2.; The only main-series game released in English.; Prior to its Japanese retail release, a special edition of the game was sold through the Japanese magazine Comic BomBom.
Medarot DS Original release date(s): JP: May 27, 2010	Release years by system: 2010—Nintendo DS
Medarot DS Original release date(s): JP: May 27, 2010	Notes: Released in two versions, Medarot DS Kabuto Ver. and Medarot DS Kuwagata Ver.; Developed by Delta Arts.; Published by Rocket Company.
Medarot 7 Original release date(s): JP: September 13, 2012	Release years by system: 2012—Nintendo 3DS
Medarot 7 Original release date(s): JP: September 13, 2012	Notes: Released in two versions, Medarot 7 Kabuto Ver. and Medarot 7 Kuwagata Ver.; Developed by Delta Arts.; Published by Rocket Company.
Medarot 8 Original release date(s): JP: August 28, 2014	Release years by system: 2014—Nintendo 3DS
Medarot 8 Original release date(s): JP: August 28, 2014	Notes: Released in two versions, Medarot 8 Kabuto Ver. and Medarot 8 Kuwagata Ver.; Developed by Delta Arts.; Published by Rocket Company.
Medarot 9 Original release date(s): JP: December 24, 2015	Release years by system: 2015—Nintendo 3DS
Medarot 9 Original release date(s): JP: December 24, 2015	Notes: Released in two versions, Medarot 9 Kabuto Ver. and Medarot 9 Kuwagata Ver.; Developed by Delta Arts.; Published by Rocket Company.; The last Medabots game developed by Delta Arts before they shut down.
Medarot Classics Original release date(s): JP: December 21, 2017	Release years by system: 2017—Nintendo 3DS
Medarot Classics Original release date(s): JP: December 21, 2017	Notes: Released in two versions, Medarot Classics Kabuto Version and Medarot Classics Kuwagata Version.; Developed by digifloyd.; Published by Imagineer.; Emulated collections of Medarot 1 to 5, enhanced with various overarching features.
Medarot Classics Plus Original release date(s): JP: November 12, 2020	Release years by system: 2020—Nintendo Switch
Medarot Classics Plus Original release date(s): JP: November 12, 2020	Notes: Released in two versions, Medarot Classics Plus Kabuto Version and Medarot Classics Plus Kuwagata Version.; Published by Imagineer.; Emulated collections of Medarot 1 to 5, Medarot Navi, Medarot G, and Medarot 2 CORE, enhanced with various overarching features.

==== Spinoffs and side games ====
Several spinoffs have been produced, some sticking closer to the RPG formula of the main series while others branch out into other genres.

For Medarot 1, 2, R, and 3, supplementary games entitled Parts Collection were made. These are shorter games with less complicated stories, focusing mostly on battles. Their main draw is that the player is able to collect robot parts and other items within the Parts Collection games and transfer them to their respective main series titles.

Game	Details
Medarot Parts Collection Original release date(s): JP: March 20, 1998	Release years by system: 1998—Game Boy
Medarot Parts Collection Original release date(s): JP: March 20, 1998	Notes: Developed by Natsume Co., Ltd.; Published by Imagineer.; Supplementary Parts Collection game for Medarot.
Medarot Parts Collection 2 Original release date(s): JP: May 29, 1998	Release years by system: 1999—Game Boy
Medarot Parts Collection 2 Original release date(s): JP: May 29, 1998	Notes: Developed by Natsume Co., Ltd.; Published by Imagineer.; Supplementary Parts Collection game for Medarot.
Medarot 2 Parts Collection Original release date(s): JP: October 29, 1999	Release years by system: 1999—Game Boy Color
Medarot 2 Parts Collection Original release date(s): JP: October 29, 1999	Notes: Developed by Natsume Co., Ltd.; Published by Imagineer.; Supplementary Parts Collection game for Medarot 2.; Compatible with the original Game Boy.
Medarot R Original release date(s): JP: November 25, 1999	Release years by system: 1999—PlayStation
Medarot R Original release date(s): JP: November 25, 1999	Notes: Developed by Natsume Co., Ltd.; Published by Imagineer.; Role-playing game with mechanics that match Medarot 2, but with battle scene graphics in 3D.; The game's setting is similar to that of Medarot 2.; Along with its supplementary Parts Collection game, the only Medabots game released for PlayStation hardware.
Medarot R Parts Collection Original release date(s): JP: March 16, 2000	Release years by system: 2000—PlayStation
Medarot R Parts Collection Original release date(s): JP: March 16, 2000	Notes: Developed by Natsume Co., Ltd.; Published by Imagineer.; Supplementary Parts Collection game for Medarot R.; Unlike the handheld Parts Collection games, this game loads the save file from the main game in order to let the player use the same Medabots. It also writes the parts obtained directly to the save file rather than requiring a transfer step. It is also completely menu-based, as opposed to having an overworld to traverse.; Includes a PocketStation minigame called Pocket Robottle.
Medarot Card Robottle Original release date(s): JP: March 10, 2000	Release years by system: 2000—Game Boy Color
Medarot Card Robottle Original release date(s): JP: March 10, 2000	Notes: Released in two versions, Medarot Card Robottle Kabuto Version and Medarot Card Robottle Kuwagata Version.; Developed by Natsume Co., Ltd.; Published by Imagineer.; A video game adaptation of one of the Medabots trading card games.; Takes place in the world of Medarot 2, but in a reality where battles are carried out through a card game instead of robots fighting.
Medarot 3 Parts Collection Z kara no Chōsenjō Original release date(s): JP: November 24, 2000	Release years by system: 2000—Game Boy Color
Medarot 3 Parts Collection Z kara no Chōsenjō Original release date(s): JP: November 24, 2000	Notes: The title translates to "Medarot 3 Parts Collection: Z's Ultimate Battlefield", and is wordplay on "chōsenjō" usually meaning "written challenge".; Developed by Natsume Co., Ltd.; Published by Imagineer.; Supplementary Parts Collection game for Medarot 3.; The last Parts Collection game produced.
Medarot Navi Original release date(s): JP: September 7, 2001	Release years by system: 2001—Game Boy Advance; 2016—Wii U Virtual Console
Medarot Navi Original release date(s): JP: September 7, 2001	Notes: Released in two versions, Medarot Navi Kabuto and Medarot Navi Kuwagata.; Developed by Natsume Co., Ltd.; Published by Imagineer on Game Boy Advance, and by Rocket Company and Imagineer on Wii U Virtual Console.; A role-playing game similar to the main series, but with a different battle system.
Medabots AX Original release date(s): NA: June 25, 2002; EU: August 2, 2002	Release years by system: 2002—Game Boy Advance; 2016—Wii U Virtual Console
Medabots AX Original release date(s): NA: June 25, 2002; EU: August 2, 2002	Notes: Released in two versions, Medabots AX: Metabee Version and Medabots AX: Rokusho Version; Developed and published by Natsume Co., Ltd.; A fighting game with gameplay identical to the Japan-exclusive Medarot G, but with story and content modified to be more similar to the anime.; The only Medabots game not to be released in Japan.
Medarot G Original release date(s): JP: July 19, 2002	Release years by system: 2002—Game Boy Advance; 2015—Wii U Virtual Console
Medarot G Original release date(s): JP: July 19, 2002	Notes: Released in two versions, Medarot G Kabuto Version and Medarot G Kuwagata Version.; Developed by Natsume Co., Ltd.; Published by Natsume Co., Ltd. on Game Boy Advance, and by Rocket Company on Wii U Virtual Console.; A fighting game with gameplay identical to Medarot AX.; Builds on the story of Medarot 5: Susutake-mura no Tenkōsei.
Medabots Infinity Original release date(s): JP: November 28, 2003; NA: December 14, 2003; EU: September 24, 2004	Release years by system: 2003—GameCube
Medabots Infinity Original release date(s): JP: November 28, 2003; NA: December 14, 2003; EU: September 24, 2004	Notes: Known in Japan as Medarot BRAVE.; Developed by Natsume Co., Ltd.; Published by Natsume Co., Ltd. in Japan and North America, and by Ubisoft in Europe.; A third-persion action role-playing game.
Shingata Medarot Original release date(s): JP: December 16, 2004	Release years by system: 2004—Game Boy Advance
Shingata Medarot Original release date(s): JP: December 16, 2004	Notes: The title translates to True Style Medarot, and is wordplay on "shingata" usually meaning "new style".; Released in two versions, Shingata Medarot Kabuto Version and Shingata Medarot Kuwagata Version.; Developed by Natsume Co., Ltd.; Published by Imagineer.; Reuses the engine and game mechanics from Medabots (Medarot 2 CORE).; Unlike earlier games in the series, which feature a distinctly anime-like art style, Shingata has a more cartoony look.; The game's story closely mirrors that of the first Medarot, albeit with new characters.
Medarot DUAL Original release date(s): JP: November 14, 2013	Release years by system: 2013—Nintendo 3DS
Medarot DUAL Original release date(s): JP: November 14, 2013	Notes: Released in two versions, Medarot DUAL Kabuto Ver. and Medarot DUAL Kuwagata Ver.; Developed by Jupiter Corporation.; Published by Rocket Company.; A third-person action game.; Has similar gameplay to Virtual On.
Medarot Girls Mission Original release date(s): JP: March 10, 2016	Release years by system: 2016—Nintendo 3DS
Medarot Girls Mission Original release date(s): JP: March 10, 2016	Notes: Released in two versions, Medarot Girls Mission Kabuto Version and Medarot Girls Mission Kuwagata Version.; Developed by Engines and KUROGANE, with assistance from Jupiter Corporation.; Published by Rocket Company.; An action game with largely the same engine as Medarot Dual. Unlike Dual, it features an all-female cast, and the overworld is replaced by visual novel-like segments.; The only Medabots game to receive a CERO C (recommended for ages 15 and above) rating. This is due to its mild sexual content: upon triumphing in battle, the player can strip opponents of their clothes by executing certain inputs.; The last Medabots game to be published by Rocket Company before they were absorbed by Imagineer.
Medarot S: Unlimited Nova Original release date(s): JP: January 23, 2020	Release years by system: 2020—iOS, Android
Medarot S: Unlimited Nova Original release date(s): JP: January 23, 2020	Notes: Developed by SoWhat.; Published by Imagineer.
Medabots Card Robattle RB Original release date(s): JP: June 25, 2026	Release years by system: 2026—Nintendo Switch
Medabots Card Robattle RB Original release date(s): JP: June 25, 2026	Notes: Developed and published by Imagineer.; Released in two versions, Medabots Card Robottle RB Kabuto Version and Medabots Card Robottle RB Kuwagata Version.

=== Manga ===
- Medarot

メダロット (Medarotto)
- Manga
- Written by: Horumarin
- Published by: Kodansha
- Magazine: Comic BomBom
- Original run: June 1997 – February 1999
- Volumes: 3
- Manga

Medarot 2
- Written by: Horumarin
- Published by: Kodansha
- English publisher: NA: Viz Media (as Medabots)
- Magazine: Comic BomBom
- Original run: May 1999 – June 2000
- Volumes: 4
- Manga

Medarot 3
- Written by: Horumarin
- Published by: Kodansha
- Magazine: Comic BomBom
- Original run: September 2000 – February 2001
- Volumes: 2
- Manga

Medarot 4
- Written by: Horumarin
- Published by: Kodansha
- Magazine: Comic BomBom
- Original run: April 2001 – November 2001
- Volumes: 2
- Manga

Medarot 5
- Written by: Horumarin
- Published by: Kodansha
- Magazine: Comic BomBom
- Original run: December 2001 – June 2002
- Volumes: 2
- Manga

Medarot G
- Written by: Horumarin
- Published by: Kodansha
- Magazine: Comic BomBom
- Original run: 2003 – 2003
- Volumes: 2
- Manga

Medarot Re-Reloaded
- Written by: Hakubayashi
- Published by: Mangahot
- Original run: December 27, 2017 – present
- Volumes: 6
- icon

Written by Horumarin, the Medabots manga series was originally serialized in the Kodansha's children's magazine Comic BomBom from 1997 to 2003. Six series were published. The first series Medarot was published between June 1997 and February 1999 and compiled in three tankōbon volumes. The second series entitled Medarot 2 was published between May 1999 and June 2000 and compiled in 4 volumes. This series was licensed for an English language release in North America by Viz Media under the title Medabots. the third series Medarot 3 was released between September 2000 and February 2001 and compiled in two volumes. The fourth series Medarot 4 was published between April and November 2001 and compiled in two volumes. The fifth series Medarot 5 was published between December 2001 and June 2002 and compiled in two volumes. The sixth series Medarot G was released in 2003 and compiled in two volumes.

=== Anime ===
- Medabots
- Promotional image showing main characters as seen in the anime

メダロット (Medarotto)
- Anime television series
- Directed by: Tensai Okamura
- Produced by: Tomoko Gushima; Yōko Matsushita
- Written by: Ryōta Yamaguchi
- Music by: Osamu Tezuka
- Studio: Bee Train; Nelvana
- Licensed by: NA: Nelvana (formerly) Discotek Media (current)
- Original network: TXN (TV Tokyo)
- English network: AUS: Network Ten, Cartoon Network; BI: Cartoon Network, Toonami; CA: YTV; IE: RTÉ2; NZ: TV3; UK: CBBC, CITV, Kix, S4C; US: Fox Broadcasting Company (Fox Kids), ABC Family; ZA: SABC 2
- Original run: July 2, 1999 – June 30, 2000
- Episodes: 52
- Anime television series

Medabots Spirits
- Directed by: Masatsugu Arakawa
- Produced by: Tomoko Gushima; Yōko Matsushita
- Written by: Yōsuke Nakagawa
- Music by: Osamu Tezuka
- Studio: Trans Arts; Nelvana
- Licensed by: NA: Nelvana (formerly) Discotek Media (current)
- Original network: TXN (TV Tokyo)
- English network: CA: YTV; US: ABC Family (Jetix)
- Original run: July 7, 2000 – March 30, 2001
- Episodes: 39
- icon

The Medabots anime series was adapted from Medarot 2, with its robotic combat elements inspired by Plawres Sanshiro. Produced by NAS and TV Tokyo and animated by Bee Train, the fifty-two-episode series originally aired on TV Tokyo from July 2, 1999, until June 30, 2000. A thirty-nine episode sequel to the anime series that was animated by Trans Arts, Medabots Spirits (メダロット魂, Medarotto Damashii) aired from July 7, 2000, to March 30, 2001.

The Japanese version has received a VHS and DVD release of the first series, while the second series has only received a VHS release. On January 29, 2010, a Region 2 boxset release known as Medarot DVD BOX 1 was released containing the first thirty episodes, with a second boxset on February 19 finishing with the last twenty-two episodes. Two boxsets for Damashii were released on December 30, 2010. This was the Production I.G series' very first DVD release.

Both series were licensed and localized into English by Canadian entertainment company Nelvana; the first series was divided into two seasons in North America. The first U.S. season originally aired on the Fox Broadcasting Company's Fox Kids block from September 1, 2001, to April 27, 2002. Medabots was Fox Kids highest-rated new series at the time. As a result of the sale of Fox Family Worldwide (the joint venture with Saban Entertainment that previously operated the Fox Kids program block) to The Walt Disney Company, Medabots would begin airing on ABC Family on March 4, 2002. The second U.S. season first aired on ABC Family from July 1 to November 2, 2002, while Damashii first aired on the network from September 13, 2003, to May 8, 2004, with later episodes aired as part of the Jetix program block. In Canada, the television series aired on YTV which, along with Nelvana, were owned by Corus Entertainment.

Under the license of Nelvana, the series was released on 12-volume VHS and DVD by ADV Films from 2002 to 2003 that ran throughout the first 52 episodes, along with the first three volumes re-released under ADV Kidz in their Essential Anime DVD lineup in 2005. Distribution was transferred to Shout! Factory, where they've released the first 26 episodes on a 4-DVD box set, that was released in early 2008. Announced at Otakon 2019, Discotek Media released the anime on SD Blu-ray, starting with the first 26 episodes of the English dub with optional closed captions on December 24, 2019. The company also announced plans to release the Japanese version in the future. On June 11, 2020, Justin Sevakis said Discotek Media were unable to find the masters for the English version of Medabots Spirits which has prevented the anime from being released on home video in North America. Discotek Media asked fans to help find the masters. On September 15, 2020, it was announced "acceptable" masters have been recovered and would have a physical release. It was released on May 25, 2021.
