= Plamo-Kyoshiro =

Japanese manga series

- Cover of the first volume, August 20, 1982

プラモ狂四郎 (Puramokyōshirō)
- Manga
- Written by: Hisashi Yasui
- Illustrated by: Koichi Yamato
- Published by: Kodansha
- Magazine: Comic BomBom
- Original run: August 20, 1982 – December 17, 1986
- Volumes: 15
- Sequels
- Shin Plamo Kyoshiro (1987–1988)

Plamo-Kyoshiro (プラモ狂四郎, Puramo Kyōshirō) is a manga series created and written by Hisashi Yasui and illustrated by Koichi Yamato. Part of Sunrise's Gundam Franchise, it was first serialized in Kodansha's Shōnen magazine Comic BomBom from August 20, 1982, until December 17, 1986, compiling up to 15 tankobon volumes.

Plamo-Kyoshiro marks as the first spinoff in the Gundam franchise outside of the Universal Century timeline, and the first series to use the concept of battles using customized Gunpla which later been used in other productions of the franchise.

== Plot ==
The story of Plamo-Kyoshiro is about Shiro Kyoda, a young boy from Tamiya City and a student of the Bandai Elementary School. Shiro is an enthusiast of plastic model kits and "Plamo Simulation", a plastic model battle game. Shiro's dream is to become the representative of Japan in the World Simulation Tournament and be able to fight in the finals in the Battle of Hobbytopia. In addition to that, the manga contained original designs that would later inspire the Mobile Suit Variations and BB Senshi series.

== Character ==
=== Shiro's Fanction ===
- Shiro Kyoda (京田四郎, Kyōda Shirō)

Shiro Kyoda is the protagonist of the series. He lives in Tamiya City and is a student of the Bandai elementary school. He is the classic shonen protagonist with an exuberant and passionate behavior, as well as being characterized as a real otaku, willing to do anything to grab the last gunpla on the market and customize it according to its personal tastes. He began to take an interest in Plamo Simulation thanks to the owner of the Craft-Man Model Shop, which he is a loyal customer, and in a short time, would be noticed among the most talented and skillful "modellers" in the country, who will not hesitate to challenge him and his gunpla at every opportunity. Shiro usually uses more or less customized Gundams as his favorite means. Among his most famous "creations" are the Perfect Gundam, the Musha Gundam and the Red Warrior.

- Futoshi Kurata

He is the owner of the modeling shop frequented by Shiro, The Craft-Man Model Shop. Also, he is the father of Midori and supporter of Shiro. He wears an apron with the flag of the United Kingdom painted on it. Shiro refers to him as "Master". On the second floor of his shop, he has a "Plamo Simulation Machine" that allows Shiro to train for the various tournaments and clash with his rivals.

- Midori Kurata(倉田みどり, Kurata Midori)

She is the daughter of Futoshi and although she is able to build models and occasionally take to "battle simulation", her role is more like a support role, almost like a "mascot". She wears an apron with the flag of the United States painted on it. Her name is a tribute to the Midori, an old manufacturer of plamo.

- Ken Maruyama (丸山健, Maruyama Ken)

He is a classmate of Shiro, and is always portrayed in camouflage clothes. Ken lives in a Western-style house and belongs to a very wealthy family. He is also a very passionate modeller, which leads him to often find himself in conflict with his friend Shiro, a rivalry that will be rekindled when, having moved to the United States because of his father's work, he will meet Saki, who would plagiarize him. He will again prove to be Shiro's friend, however, at the end of the World Simulation tournament, where he will not hesitate to betray Saki, tired of his cruel behavior.His name is a tribute to Marusan, the first toy company to produce plamo in Japan. Ken uses plamo from various series (especially Dougram) and in various scales for his fights. While it generally makes extensive use of Zeon media, including various Zaku, the Gelgoog and the Acguy, worthy of mention is also the use of a GM Cannon, a Federation mobile suit.

- Koichi Kida (木田晃一, Kida Koichi)

He is a classmate of Shiro and Ken Maruyama's right-hand, nicknamed Kibou (キー坊., Kībō) Initially, he too will be in a position of rivalry with the protagonist, but then find himself his friend after joining forces against modelers from other schools and shops. He is not a skilled fighter like Shiro and Ken, but his support often proves to be fundamental. He stops building gunpla and taking part in the Simulation Battles after being banned by his mother, in view of the school exams. Like Ken, Kouichi also makes use of various media from various series, but is generally associated with mobile armors and support vehicles.

- Tomita (富田, Tomita)

University graduate. He is a sportsman (boxer) who has skill of model making. He also works as a instructor at the Athletic Club. he has a great influence on Shiro as a modeler. He recommended Shiro to "put your soul in his own plastic model". Also in the sequel's "New Plamo Kyoshiro", he appeared as an advisor to the new protagonist.

- Hirofumi Fujii (Aka Rom)
- Iwaki Tetsuo (Gozu Iron)
- Hitto-Kun (飛人くん, Hitto Kun)

Hitto Ebara (江原飛人, Ebara Hitto) affectionately known as Hitto Kun, is the cousin of Shiro Kyoda. He is the protagonist of the comic series Hobby Boy Hitto-Kun, which was published by TV Magazine, a sister magazine of Comic Bom Bom and produced by Kodansha. Shiro Kyoda also appeared in this comic regularly. Hitto is immersed in the world of the Plamo Simulation thanks to Shiro. Hitto appears in an additional section after the end of Plamo-Kyoshiro in its last volume. He is very young and does not have the ability to assemble plastic models, which is why he uses toys in his plamo battles. His favorite robot is the diecast RX-78 Gundam model released by Clover. He defeated Shiro's Prototype Gundam with his diecast Gundam. He also appears as fat teenager in the sequel series Shin Plamo-Kyoshiro.

=== Rival Fanction ===
- Akira Yamane (山根アキラ, Yamane Akira)

Akira is the first recurrent antagonist to give Kyoshiro a hard time. He is the leader of the modeling club Plamo Teikoku Emperor, locateded on the Taiyo Model Shop. He is extremely competitive and he hates to lose, and his models are characterized by dark but realistic colors, along the lines of Okawara's "Real Type". Despite being a caustic rival of Shiro, he does not hesitate to join forces against the common threat of Saki. He has a predilection for Zeon models, and among his favorite vehicles are the Gouf, Hi-Zack and Zssa in custom colors.

- Muraoka (村岡, Muraoka)

Store Manager of the Taiyo Model Shop. Muraoka was a classmate of Kurata in college days and was a member of the College's Plamo Club. He also owns his own plastic simulation machine. He dislikes to lose and his personality is disgusting, Even Kurata may even complain to his attitude. he likes to provoke Shiro Calling him Gundam boy.

- The Nanbangzan Mountain (南郷快山, Nangō Kai Yama)

The giant of the Satsuma model Association who came to Tokyo to challenge Kyoshiro. He wears student clothes and speaks using the dialect of Kagoshima. Ha has a Dog called Tamasaburo (タマサブロー) who also participates in the simulation with him. In the first fight against Shiro he fought with the help of his Dog.

- Kuraii Ichiro (蔵井明市郎, Kurai Akira Ichirō)

A model maker specialized in World War II models, particularly German tanks. He likes dress up as a Nazi general.

- The Kageyama Siblings (景山姉弟, Kageyama kyōdai)
- The Tenma Brothers (天満兄弟, Tenma Kyōdai)

The three-man team of the Tenma Brothers is composed of (from top to bottom in the photo) Taro Tenma, Kotaro Tenma, and Goda Tenma. They are descendants of a ninja family lineage. At first, they are rivals of Shiro but in the course of the series, they become allies getting to fight next to the against the faction of Saki Takeda in the wars of Sekigahara.

- The Ushiwaka Brothers (牛若兄弟, Ushi waka Kyōdai)

The three brothers who are representatives of Kyoto who defeated the Temma Brothers. From left to right on the photo: Benkei, Yoshimaru (is a boy despite the long hair) and Jing. The Ushikawa Brothers fought against Shiro in the World Simulation Tournament, but were defeated by the KyoShiro team. The fat and big Benkei uses a MS-09R Rick Dom with a Big Basket Full of Weapons, because he likes to collect the weapons of the enemies he has destroyed, a reference to Musashibo Benkei. Yoshimaru has a uses a MS - 14B Gelgoog capable of separating into two halves, revaling a secret weapon, and Jing, uses a Heavy Metal G.Roon. Jing is an expert in electrical engineering, supplying electric current to the opponent to electrocute them, having had a generator as a

== Mecha ==
=== Shiro Side ===
RX-78-2 Gundam (ガンダム, Gandamu)
The original Gunpla High-Grade scale 1/144 RX-78-2 Gundam from anime Mobile Suit Gundam with same original Armaments weapons it was piloted by Shiro Kyoda, first time experience join Gunpla battle simulation later made upgrade into customize with shiro ideal.
Gundam Underwater Type (ガンダム水中型, Gandamu suichū-gata)
FA-78-1 Full Armor Gundam (フルアーマーガンダム, Furuāmāgandamu)
A variant RX-78-2 design wearing green full armor armed from previous in "Mobile Suit Variation" (MSV) later upgrade into Perfect Gundam II.
FA-78-2 Heavy Gundam (ヘビーガンダム, Hebīgandamu)
Another variant Full Armor Gundam after previous battle made lightweight machine from full armor armed form, apparently previous in "Mobile Suit X." (MSX)
PF-78-1 Perfect Gundam (パーフェクトガンダム, Pāfekutogandamu)
New original customize made by scratch and build Shiro ideal self, equipment new full armor design arm
PF-78-2 Perfect Gundam II (パーフェクトガンダムII, Pāfekutogandamu II)
PF-78-3 Pefect Gundam III (パーフェクトガンダムIII, Pāfekutogandamu III)
H.C.M. Perfect Gundam (H.C.M.パーフェクトガンダム, H. C. M. Pāfekutogandamu)

== Production ==
Plamo-Kyoshiro was written by Hisashi Yasui and illustrated by Koichi Yamato. In 1981 Kodansha had released the first issue of its magazine Comic Bom Bom. At that moment, the publisher was planning to launch a manga adaptation of the Mobile Suit Gundam movies, but the publisher was unable to get Sunrise's permission at the time. As an alternative plan, the publisher contacted Hisashi Yasui to create a new series, thus creating Plamo-Kyoshiro. Furthermore, the Plamo-Kyoshiro manga was created as a tool to publicize the Gundam plastic models that Bandai was launching at the time.

Plastic models from other popular franchises also make appearances in Plamo-Kyoshiro, including those from Votoms, Dunbine, Dougram, Vifam, L-Gaim, Xabungle, Baldios, Star Wars, The Exorcist, Thunderbirds and Blue Thunder. More standard models such as those of airplanes, tanks and other vehicles make appearances. In addition, the characters appear customizing and creating their own original models of Vehicles and Robots. The manga also includes many references to real life companies and figures involved in the plastic model kit industry.

== Media ==
=== Manga ===
The original edition had 15 volumes and was in publication from August 20, 1982, until December 17, 1986, in Comic Bom Bom magazine by Kodansha. In 1989 a standalone volume was published entitled "Plamo-Kyoshiro-Musha Gundam Version". In 1990 a second edition of 11 volumes was launched. In 1999 a 6-volume deluxe edition was published. Between 2002 and 2004 a cheaper version of 13 volumes was published and in the year 2008 a paperback edition of 10 volumes was published. All Plamo-Kyoshiro publications, from the original 1982 until the last of 2008 have been published by Kodansha. The manga has also received several sequels and derivatives.

The success of Plamo Kyoshiro marked a trend at the time of its publication and several publishers wanted to have a manga based on battles of plastic models. Coro Coro Comic launched a few similar-themed manga such as Plamo Tensai Esper Taro, 3D Koshien Plamo Daisaku, Majin Eiyuuden Wataru and Majin Kaihatsu Daisakusen. Hobby Boy Hitto-kun was another manga that was published in Terebi Magazine 2 (a sister magazine to Comic Bom Bom).

=== Merchendise ===
Bandai released several plastic models based on the mobile suits in the manga during its publication. Years later, Bandai released Master Grade Models based on both the Perfect Gundam and the Perfect Zeon, while later created the short-lived Kyoshiro Maniax line of Gundam FIX Figuration figures. The Perfect Gundam and the Red Warrior were also released under Bandai Spirit's Robot Spirits line of posable premium figures.

== See also ==
- Gundam model
- Hyper Warrior Gundam Boy - same authors and same Artist, in set same in Plamo-KyoShiro world manga series but no direct connection of first manga, unlikely previous first series in set plot story where a child boy who has love SD Gundam series.
- Model Suit Gunpla Builders Beginning G -
- Gundam Build Fighters
- Gundam Build Divers
- Plawres Sanshiro
