= Comic BomBom =

Japanese manga magazine

- Cover of the final issue of Comic BomBom
- Categories: Children's manga (elementary school boys)
- Frequency: Monthly; Weekly (Pixiv Comic)
- First issue: October 15, 1981
- Final issue: November 15, 2007
- Company: Kodansha
- Country: Japan
- Based in: Tokyo
- Language: Japanese
- Website: Comic BomBom at the Wayback Machine (archive index); Pixiv revival

Comic BomBom (Japanese: コミックボンボン, Hepburn: Komikku Bonbon) was a monthly Japanese children's manga magazine published by Kodansha and aimed at elementary school boys. It was first published on October 15, 1981, and ceased publication in 2007. A web version of the magazine has been published on Pixiv Comic since the end of July 2017.

Similar to its rival magazine CoroCoro Comic, the magazine featured many tie-ins with game and toy manufacturers, but these became fewer and fewer toward the end of the publication period.

== History ==
=== Magazine Launch ===
The first issue of Comic BomBom was published on October 15, 1981, in response to the monthly CoroCoro Comic (Shogakukan). 2 months later, the second issue was published and the magazine became a monthly publication from then on. It featured hobby manga, gag manga, and Mobile Suit Gundam at its core. The first editor-in-chief, Toshio Tanaka, said in an interview with Channel Kitano that he had originally promised George Akiyama that Spatman X would be made into an anime, and even went so far as to sign an anime deal with Asahi Tsushinsha (later ADK Holdings and ADK Emotions), but the deal was blocked by Shogakukan and never materialized.

=== Gunpla Boom ===
Noticing that the Gundam boom was starting to ignite among elementary school students and younger with gunpla, the magazine began to include features that dealt mainly with Gundam toys. In conjunction with the Plamo-Kyoshiro series centering on fighting with plastic models and kitbashing techniques for existing products, the magazine triggered a huge gunpla boom and had a major impact, including the appearance of Perfect Gundam and other gunpla from this magazine. The magazine also contributed greatly to the development of Mobile Suit Variation, and was said to have value as a Gundam reference material, with Ace Pilot Retsuden being particularly highly rated. Since then, the magazine has had close ties with Gundam. In addition, while many Real Robot anime were created under the influence of Gundam, Fang of the Sun Dougram and Armored Trooper Votoms were also serialized in manga form, and plastic models also appeared in Plamo-Kyoshiro and in special feature articles. For a manga magazine aimed at young children, it is also notable that these model-related articles were included in the magazine for a long time.

During the Nintendo Entertainment System boom, Famicom Fūunji and Famiken Ryū were serialized. During the sticker boom, the magazine competed with CoroCoro's Bikkuriman stickers with Wrestler Gundan stickers and Hiden Ninpōchō stickers, while carrying information on Bikkuriman stickers.

The magazine continued to create a boom by serializing features and manga based on popular franchises such as Transformers, SD Gundam, Mega Man, Super Mario, and Godzilla. Many well-received original manga were also produced. Especially in the SD Gundam BB Senshi series, during the latter half of the Musha Shichinin Shuu Hen and the Chijō Saikyō Hen period, Musha Gundam had overtaken its archrival CoroCoro in terms of circulation for three years from 1991.

Many readers consider any one of these years to be the golden age of the magazine. The specific years vary from generation to generation, but the golden years include the magazine's launch when the media franchising of Mobile Suit Variation was being carried out, the late 1980s to early 1990s, when circulation was said to have been highest due to the SD Gundam boom, and the mid-1990s, when manga with a higher target age range such as Onsen Gappadonba Caparante Densetsu were being produced and when the magazine covered fanatical subjects such as Neon Genesis Evangelion, American comic books (Teenage Mutant Ninja Turtles, X-Men, etc.), and figurines.

=== Pokémon Boom ===
From the mid-1990s onward, rival magazine CoroCoro was a major contributor to the Pokémon boom by launching tie-ins from the time of its release, and doubled its circulation in 1996 from the previous year. BomBom was far behind CoroCoro, which continued to have other strong tie-ins, such as Mini 4WD, B-Daman, Hyper Yo-Yo, Beyblade, Duel Masters, and Mushiking: The King of Beetles, in terms of circulation. In addition, the Mega Man series, which had been published in BomBom for many years, began to tie-in with CoroCoro starting with the Mega Man Battle Network series.

In response, BomBom also took the tie-in route in a losing effort, with titles such as Beast Wars: Transformers, Medabots, Robopon, Crush Gear, Daikaijū Monogatari: The Miracle of the Zone, and Shin Megami Tensei: Devil Children. While some of them had some success, most of them ended with near disastrous results, and even sister publications such as Deluxe BomBom all ceased publication around the late 1990s.

In the late 1990s, the magazine serialized manga works such as Jing: King of Bandits, Okiraku Ninden Hanzō, and Mega Man X that were popular not only among BomBom's primary readers but also among older readers, but due to a change in editor (the return of Shinpachirō Ikeda), Jing was transferred to Monthly Magazine Z and all others were cancelled. Ikeda, the editor-in-chief at the time, said that the change of serialized works was made in order to reduce the fanatical elements that might affect the magazine itself and its target audience.

One theory also suggests that it was not the loss of popularity, but rather the inhospitable treatment of the authors that caused the defection. However, as mentioned above, there were successful tie-in manga and other products, and some argue that the golden age was around 2000, when Medabots, Shin Megami Tensei: Devil Children, and Cyborg Kuro-chan were all in vogue.

=== Major Overhaul ===
Starting with the January 2006 issue, the magazine changed to a larger format, and at the same time, a major overhaul of the magazine and its serialized works was decided. Hobby-related articles were downsized, and the number of authors from other Kodansha magazines increased dramatically. In addition, the logo was changed from the July issue of the same year, and at the same time, the mascot character "B-Gon" on the spine of the tankōbon compilations was changed to a bomb symbol. However, B-Gon was continued to be used for some of the tankōbon that had been published before the renewal, and for Umi no Tairiku NOA vol. 3, which was bound in the same style as the previous editions.

As for additional publications, on September 29, 2006, Abracadabra, which specialized in fantasy, and on October 5, 2006, Gundam Magazine, which specialized in Gundam and had previously been published, were published as BomBom's sister magazines for the first time in 10 years.

However, the renewal did not halt the slump in circulation, and the number of copies published dropped by half, from 100,000 to 50,000. Later, it regained some momentum with the success of Deltora Quest, and in 2007 it made a major push for GeGeGe no Kitarō which was followed by the start of the fifth series of the TV anime. The popularity of SD Gundam has declined, and some consider SD Gundam Musha Banchō Fūunroku and SD Gundam Sangokuden to be treated less favorably than the two series mentioned above. There was also an increase in the number of one-shots, new serials, and works such as Transformers: Cybertron that were cancelled despite the popularity of the anime counterpart. The thickness of the magazine itself was initially thinner than the pre-large format, but gradually became as thick as Monthly Shōnen Gangan and Deluxe BomBom due to changes in the paper quality and the aforementioned one-shots.

=== Discontinuation ===
In late June 2007, manga author Jun Ishikawa made a statement on Mixi and in a diary on his website suggesting that the magazine would cease publication. Although this was not official information, it was circulated on news sites and anonymous bulletin boards, causing a great commotion. On July 17, 2007, Kodansha officially announced that the magazine would end with the December issue, which went on sale on November 15, 2007, due to low circulation, and the November issue of BomBom also announced the ceasing of publication. Most of the manga serialized in the December issue, the final issue, reached their conclusion, and Telemanga Heroes, the supplement magazine of TV Magazine, was published on March 15, 2008, to accept some unfinished works such as Deltora Quest, and some artists who had serialized in BomBom also participated in the magazine.

In conjunction with the discontinuation of BomBom, Kodansha announced the launch of a new junior high school boys' manga magazine, Monthly Shōnen Rival, in the spring of 2008, but unlike the concept of BomBom, Rival's editor-in-chief denied that it was a successor to BomBom.

Gen Satō, who had been at loggerheads with the editorial department for various reasons while serializing Bakushō Senshi! SD Gundam and other titles in the magazine, expressed his regret on his blog on the same day that the cessation of the magazine was announced, interweaving several admonishments with criticisms about the editorial department's practices.

A few years after the suspension of BomBom, more and more BomBom works started being reprinted by Fukkan.com. Perhaps influenced by this, Kodansha has also been reprinting titles like Cyborg Kuro-chan and Shin Megami Tensei: Devil Children under the title of Revival BomBom Series since 2012.

=== Web Revival ===
On July 21, 2017, it was reported that the manga that had been published in the magazine will begin to be re-published within Pixiv Comic. In addition to the re-publication, new works such as Kyō no Koneko no Chī and Kutsudaru. were also published. Updates are made every Friday.

== Featured manga ==
Note: Series with an asterisk next to them were currently running when the magazine ceased publication in Dec 2007.

=== 1980s ===
- Spat Man X (Nov 1981 – Oct 1982)
- Let's Go! Shun-chan (Nov 1981 – Sep 1985)
- Himitsu Shirei 0059 (Nov 1981 – Jun 1983)
- Little Fisherman (Nov 1981 – Jun 1983)
- Soup Man (Nov 1981 – July 1984)
- Fang of the Sun Dougram (Nov 1981 – Apr 1983)
- Musashi and Kojiro (Nov 1981 – Jul 1983)
- Shutter No. 1 (Nov 1981 – Mar 1982)
- Hatesate Nander (Nov 1981 – Aug 1982)
- Maki and Cal (Nov 1981 – Jul 1982)
- Hoshi no Piiton (Nov 1981 – Jun 1982)
- Bowler! Fighting Spirit (Nov 1981 – Jun 1984)
- DonDokoDon (Nov 1981 – Jan 1982)
- Hop Step Champ (Nov 1981 – Jan 1982)
- Baku-chan (Nov 1981 – Apr 1982)
- Cosmo Sorojaa (Nov 1981 – Aug 1982)
- Conbini Enchou (Nov 1981 – Apr 1982)
- Hakuriki Sensei (Jan 1982 – Mar 1982)
- Plamo-Kyoshiro (Feb 1982 – Nov 1986)
- Aura Battler Dunbine (Feb 1983 – Feb 1984)
- Armored Trooper Votoms (May 1983 – Apr 1984)
- Ginga Hyōryū Vifam (Oct 1983 – Oct 1984)
- Heavy Metal L-Gaim (Mar 1984 – Mar 1985)
- RoboRobo Company (May 1984 – Feb 1986)
- RC Kid (Jun 1984 – Mar 1987)
- Mobile Suit Gundam MS Senki (Nov 1984 – Feb 1985)
- Kikou Kai Gallian (Nov 1984 – Apr 1985)
- Sports Robo Garrett (Nov 1984 – Apr 1985)
- Mobile Suit Zeta Gundam (Mar 1985 – Feb 1986)
- Fly! Rally (Aug 1985 – Oct 1985)
- Ge Ge Ge no Kitaro (Saishinban) (Oct 1985 – Sep 1987)
- Mobile Suit Gundam ZZ (Mar 1986 – Feb 1987)
- G.I. Joe (Sep 1986 – Feb 1987)
- Shin Plamo Kyoshiro (Jan 1987 – Feb 1988)
- Miss! Police (Apr 1987 – May 1987)
- Osomatsu-kun (Nov 1987 – Mar 1990)
- Yoroiden Samurai Troopers (Ronin Warriors) (May 1988 – Mar 1989)
- Super Mario (Dec 1988 – Sep 1998)
- Plamo Kyoshiro Musha Gundam
- Hyper Frenzy Gundam Boy (Jan 1989 – Nov 1993)
- Mobile Guit Gundam 0080: War in the Pocket (Apr 1989 – Aug 1989)
- SD Gundam Gaiden Knight Gundam Monogatari Lacoa no Yuusha (Aug 1989 – Feb 1993)

=== 1990s ===
- Gundlander (Jul 1990 – Apr 1994)
- Dr. Mario (Aug 1990 – Oct 1990)
- Kōryū Densetsu Villgust
- Mobile Suit Gundam F91 (Jan 1991 – May 1991)
- Mr. Masashi (Sep 1991 – Jun 1992)
- Rockman 4 (Jan 1992 – May 1992)
- Rockman (Jun 1992 – Oct 1992)
- Hayate Ultra Ninpocho (Aug 1992 – Jul 1997)
- Rockman 5 (Nov 1992 – Sep 1993)
- Fatal Fury (Mar 1993 – Sep 1993)
- Dan Dan Danku! (Sep 1993 – Apr 1997)
- Fatal Fury 2 (Oct 1993 – Jan 1995)
- Rockman 6 (Oct 1993 – Dec 1994)
- Rockman X (Jan 1994 – Aug 1998)
- Mutant Turtles (Mar 1994 – May 1994)
- Mutant Turtles 3 (Jun 1994 – Nov 1994)
- Super Mario / Donkey Kong (Aug 1994 – Dec 1994)
- X-Men (4-panel comic strips) (Aug 1994 – Apr 1995)
- Plasmo Wars (Dec 1994 – Apr 1998)
- The Men Who Created Rockman: The Legend of Rockman's Birth (Jan 1995 – Feb 1995)
- Super Donkey Kong with Mario (Jan 1995 – Aug 1995)
- Rockman 7 (Mar 1995 – Aug 1996)
- Jing: King of Bandits (Apr 1995 – May 1998)
- Street Fighter II V (May 1995 – May 1996)
- Mutant Turtles '95 (Jun 1995 – Dec 1995)
- Fatal Fury 3 (Jun 1995 – Jan 1996)
- Mutant Turtles '96 (Jan 1996 – Oct 1996)
- School Ghost Stories 2 (Jun 1996 – Aug 1996)
- Super Mario 64 (Jul 1996 – Sep 1998)
- Umi no Tairiku NOA (Nov 1996 – Apr 1997), (Dec 2005 – Feb 2006)
- Rockman 8 (Feb 1997 – Mar 1998)
- Rockman MANIAX (May 1997 – Feb 1998)
- School Ghost Stories 3 (Jun 1997 – Aug 1997)
- Medarot (Medabots) (Jun 1997 – Apr 1999)
- Ultra Ninpocho Kotobuki (Aug 1997 – Nov 1998)
- Cyborg Kuro-chan (Sep 1997 – Dec 2001)
- SD Gundam Fullcolor Theater (Nov 1997 – Dec 2007) *
- Rockman & Forte (Apr 1998 – Jan 1999)
- Beast Wars II: Super Life-Form Transformers (Jul 1998 – Feb 1999)
- Small Giant Microman (Oct 1998 – Dec 1999)
- Ultra Ninpocho Cho (Dec 1998 – Mar 2001)
- Daikaijū Monogatari
- Shin Musha Gundam Chou Kidou Daishougun
- Chou Musha Gundam Bushin Kirahagane
- Chou Musha Gundam Touba Daishougun
- Super Life-Form Transformers: Beast Wars Neo (Mar 1999 – Oct 1999)
- Power Stone (Apr 1999 – Sep 1999)
- Medarot 2 (Medabots 2) (May 1999 – Jun 2000)
- Kakutō Ryōri Densetsu Bistro Recipe (Oct 1999 – Oct 2000)
- Medarotter Rintaro! Medarot R (Medabots R) (Oct 1999 – Jul 2000)
- Transformers: Beast Wars Transmetals (Nov 1999 – Apr 2000)
- Shin Iyahaya-kun
- Chou Musha Gundam Tensei Shichinin Shuu
- Chou Musha Gundam Musha Senki Hikari no Hengen Hen
- Doonto! Dragon Kid!
- Herohero-kun
- Shōkan-ō Rekusu

=== 2000s ===
- Microman Red Powers (Mar 2000 – Jul 2000)
- Medarot 3 (Medabots 3) (Jul 2000 – Feb 2002)
- Shin Megami Tensei: Devil Children (Aug 2000 – Sep 2002)
- SD Gundam Eiyuden (Sep 2000 – Jul 2002)
- Medarot 4 (Medabots 4) (Apr 2001 – Nov 2001)
- Medarot Navi (Medabots Navi) (Jul 2001 – Dec 2001)
- SD Gundam Mushamaruden Trilogy (Jul 2001 – May 2004)
- Crush Gear Turbo (Oct 2001 – Jan 2003)
- Medarot 5 (Medabots 5) (Dec 2001 – Jun 2002)
- Monsters, Inc. (Apr 2002 – Jun 2002)
- Ultra Ninpocho Teru (Jul 2002 – Dec 2005)
- Medarot G (Medabots G) (Aug 2002 – Jul 2003)
- Little Buster Q (Oct 2002 – Nov 2002)
- Mr. Driller (Oct 2002 – Jun 2003)
- Shin Megami Tensei: Devil Children Light & Dark (Nov 2002 – Mar 2004)
- Metroid Samus & Joe (Dec 2002 – Apr 2005)
- Cyborg Kuro-chan: Bangai Battle (Dec 2002 – Dec 2005)
- Dr. Mario-kun (Jan 2003 – Dec 2007) *
- Crush Gear Nitro (Feb 2003 – Mar 2004)
- Magician Tantei A (Jun 2003 – Mar 2006)
- Taiko no Tatsujin (Dec 2003 – Apr 2005)
- SD Gundam Force (Jan 2004 – Aug 2005)
- Musharetsuden Bukabuka Hen
- GeGeGe no Kitaro R: A Thousand Yokai Tales (Jun 2004 – Dec 2005)
- Spider-Man J (Sep 2004 – Nov 2006)
- Mobile Suit Gundam SEED Destiny
- Idaten Jump (2005–2006)
- Q Robo Transformers
- Transformers Galaxy Force
- Kikai Wakusei Garakutania
- Metroid Prime Episode of Aether (Jul 2005 – Jan 2006)
- Ultra Ninja Manual Flash
- Tarpan
- Deltora Quest (Nov 2005 – Dec 2007) *
- Monster Soul (Jan 2006 – Mar 2006)
- SD Gundam Musha Banchō Fūunroku (Jan 2006 – Jul 2007)
- Do Suru!? Paradise (Jan 2006 – Nov 2006)
- Gon-chan (Jan 2006 – Jan 2007)
- Ojamajin Yamada-kun!! (Jan 2006 – Dec 2007) *
- B.B.D Big Bad Daddy (Mar 2006 – Jul 2006)
- Angel's Frypan (Apr 2006 – Dec 2007) *
- Star of Happiness Haghal
- Gentle-san (Sep 2006 – Sep 2007)
- Goki-chan (May 2006 – Aug 2007)
- Boku no Shiawase (Jun 2006 – Jan 2007)
- Goblin (Jun 2006 – Aug 2007)
- Monster Soul 2nd (Jun 2007 – Sep 2007)
- Roboo! (Jun 2006 – Dec 2007) *
- Umi no Tairiku NOA PLUS+ (Jul 2006 – Nov 2007)
- Bakeneko Anzu-chan (Aug 2006 – Nov 2007)
- Totsugeki Chicken! (Aug 2006 – Dec 2007) *
- Negima!? neo (Nov 2006 – Nov 2007)
- Mobile Suit Gundam ALIVE (Nov 2006 – Dec 2007) *
- Hotaruna Mystic (Dec 2006 – Dec 2007) *
- GeGeGe no Kitaro: A Thousand Yokai Tales (Apr 2007 – Dec 2007) *
- Kotetsuden (May 2007 – Dec 2007) *
- SD Gundam The Three Kingdoms (Jul 2007 – Dec 2007) *
