= Jing: King of Bandits =

Japanese manga and anime series

王ドロボウJING (Ō Dorobō Jing)
- Manga
- Written by: Yuichi Kumakura
- Published by: Kodansha
- English publisher: NA: Tokyopop
- Magazine: Comic Bom Bom
- Original run: March 15, 1995 – April 15, 1998
- Volumes: 7
- Manga

Jing: King of Bandits: Twilight Tales
- Written by: Yuichi Kumakura
- Published by: Kodansha
- English publisher: NA: Tokyopop
- Magazine: Magazine Z
- Original run: August 1999 – July 2005
- Volumes: 7
- Anime television series
- Directed by: Hiroshi Watanabe
- Written by: Reiko Yoshida
- Music by: Scudelia Electro
- Studio: Studio Deen
- Licensed by: NA: ADV Films (former) AEsir Holdings (currently)
- Original network: NHK
- Original run: May 15, 2002 – August 14, 2002
- Episodes: 13
- Original video animation

Jing, King of Bandits: Seventh Heaven
- Directed by: Hiroshi Watanabe
- Written by: Reiko Yoshida
- Music by: Scudelia Electro
- Studio: Studio Deen
- Licensed by: NA: Funimation
- Released: January 21, 2004 – April 28, 2004
- Runtime: 30 minutes (per episode)
- Episodes: 3

Jing: King of Bandits (Japanese: 王ドロボウJING, Hepburn: Ō Dorobō Jing; lit. "King of Bandit Jing"), is a Japanese manga series written and illustrated by Yuichi Kumakura. The series was originally serialized in Kodansha's Comic Bom Bom magazine from 1995 to 1998; the publisher later collected the individual chapters into seven tankōbon volumes. The series continued in Kodansha's Magazine Z in 1999, under the title KING OF BANDIT JING, known as Jing: King of Bandits: Twilight Tales outside of Japan and ran until finishing in 2005. The story revolves around a teenage boy named Jing who despite his young age is known as the "King of Bandits". Along with his partner Kir, a talking albatross, he travels the world in search of new adventures and legendary treasure. Throughout the series the duo manage to pull off impossible heists and outwit countless enemies that stand in their way.

Jing: King of Bandits features a motif in the form of references to alcohol. Volumes of the manga are "bottles", episodes and chapters are "shots", Jing and Kir's special attack is a "Kir Royal", and almost every character and location is named after an alcoholic beverage or cocktail.

In 2002, five of the original seven manga volumes were adapted into an anime television series that totaled 13 episodes. Produced by Aniplex and animated by Studio Deen, the TV series aired on NHK from May 15, 2002, to August 14, 2002. The two studios went on to produce a three part original video animation that adapted the fourth volume of the original manga in 2004 under the title Jing: King of Bandits in Seventh Heaven (王ドロボウ JING in Seventh Heaven). Tokyopop licensed both the original manga and Twilight Tales for English-language releases in North America, while ADV Films handled the licensing of the anime series and the Seventh Heaven original video animation.

== Synopsis ==
King of Bandits Jing is a series of short, usually disconnected stories starring the young boy who calls himself Jing, the Bandit King. Although Jing's reputation seems to extend throughout the universe of the series, many enemies underestimate him, not expecting the "great" King of Bandits to be a "little kid".

The stories vary a great deal, especially between the initial manga series and the sequel series, Jing: King of Bandits: Twilight Tales. In the initial series, stories often border on comical and cartoonish. Each arc includes a new treasure or object that Jing is seeking, a woman or girl who accompanies him somewhere along the way on his quest for this item, and an enemy that either wants to protect what it is he intends to steal, or get to it before he does. Settings also vary; Jing travels to a clockwork city, a desert with living lava, and even deliberately gets himself arrested to steal something from inside a maximum security prison, among other fantastic locales. He always escapes in the end of each arc, and always manages to steal his target, although not always in the way that the characters or the reader expects. Each arc also features the upset of some restrictive societal norm thanks to Jing's intervention; rulers are dethroned, prison riots are caused, an entire corrupt religion is reduced to shambles.

Twilight Tales also ran seven volumes. Jing no longer manages to steal every treasure he sets out after in the arcs. In Twilight Tales, more often than not, Jing actually winds up fighting the sought object, or having to destroy it in some way. There is also a short arc featuring Jing's past. In both these childhood arcs, Jing is already calling himself the King of Bandits. There is no fixed ending for either series.

== Characters ==
Jing (ジン, Jin)
Voiced by: Mitsuki Saiga (Japanese); Joey Hood (English)
He is the protagonist of the series and The Bandit Boy Wonder. A young black haired thief in a flowing orange trenchcoat, his exceptional skills and dedication are seemingly contradicted by his laid-back manner. He approaches life with a disarming, confident cheerfulness, selecting his targets seemingly on a whim. Because he is such a legendary figure, many people are surprised when they meet him in person, as he is rather small and unassuming at first glance. His skills as a thief, however, are without equal. He travels the world with his best friend, Kir, a talking albatross bird with whom he can combine to unleash the deadly Kir Royale attack, which is a green ball of energy shot out of Kir's mouth. He also holds a hidden retractable knife in his right sleeve and usually uses it when the Kir Royale would be a waste; its worth noting that the knife goes through a small handful of 'upgrades:' as a boy, it seemingly hid oversized kitchen utensils, in the primary series it becomes a simple slightly curved single edged knife, and by the time of Twilight Tales - it is a full blown double-edged blade almost the size of a short sword. He isn't restricted to this however, as he also seems to be capable of turning anything into a weapon, such as wires as seen when he traps attack dogs or an umbrella he uses to diffuse a Kir Royale blast. That said though, his single greatest weapon is his mind - although never really highlighted, Jing is an extremely keen analyst, almost impossibly clever in executing his plans, and most importantly - has a talent for improvising when something actually doesn't work out his way (a rarity in itself). Strangely, his single greatest treasure is a simple green necklace, which never truly has its purpose revealed.
Kir (キール, Kiiru)
Voiced by: Ryusei Nakao (Japanese); Ron Berry (English)
He is Jing's sidekick and partner in crime, a feisty talking avian with a big mouth. Despite being a bird, he is constantly chasing human women and usually hits on each episode's Jing Girl at every opportunity. Nonetheless, he is always rejected (curiously, the rejection is always due to his mannerisms and personality, and not the fact that he is a bird). Kir is a bit greedier than Jing and often wonders why the latter doesn't go after targets with more monetary value. Nonetheless, he is a steadfast friend and invaluable partner to Jing. As noted, Kir is Jing's primary source of firepower - when fused onto his right arm, he can fire a large ball of energy aptly named 'Kir Royale,' although seemingly infinite in power - Kir has shown exhaustion over firing too many in a sequence. In this fused form, Kir can also grant Jing some limited flight. In a certain chapter involving a porvora delivery, it is seen for the first and only time that Kir is not unique to his species; mines around the world that Jing takes place make full use of these birds for demolition purposes - as such, the question is whether or not the Kir Royale is any stronger than that of his brethren's blasts.
Postino (ポスティーノ, Posutiino)
Voiced by: Shin-ichiro Miki (Japanese); Gray Haddock (English)
He is the only other recurring character, and is a good example of the series' surreal tone. Postino is a mail carrier who travels by motorcycle, and whose route seems to include the entire world. He appears, seemingly on cue, at some point in each episode just as Jing is in need of help. He drives up, delivers a clue or plot exposition, and then drives away, and is not seen again for the remainder of the story. Postino is both a parody of Deus ex machina plot devices, and an example of the surreal and sometimes illogical world which Jing inhabits. Postino appeared only once in the original manga, in the "Amarcord" story. He appears twice in the Twilight Tales series, once in volume one, and once in volume five.

== Media ==
=== Manga ===
==== Original series ====
No.	Original release date	Original ISBN	English release date	English ISBN
1	November 6, 1995	4-06-321758-2	June 10, 2003	9781591821762
1st shot - In the City of Thieves; 2nd shot - Mystery of the Phantom Ship; 3rd shot - The King of Bandits' Test; 4th shot - No Time for Adonis; Early Design Collection
Jing enters the City of Thieves with the intent of stealing the Double Mermaid, but Mayor Cognac is dead set on standing in his path. Jing secures the help of some local bandits, and launches a surprise attack on Cognac's lighthouse. He then travels to Blue Hawaii, and with the "help" of Rose, law-enforcer-in-training, investigates a ghost ship that has been plaguing the town. It is revealed to be the secret casino Morte Calon, and the proprietor, Grappa, is determined on trapping the King of Bandits with his own desire—But his plan backfires. Lastly, Jing visits Adonis, the city of tyrannical time, with the intention of stealing the fabled clockwork grapes. When Kir saves a girl named Mirabelle from execution for being tardy, he arouses the anger of Mastergear, ruler of Adonis, who has an integration partner of his own—a fox by the name of Sherry, comparable in power to Kir, but nowhere near as loyal to her master.
2	June 6, 1996	4-06-321775-2	August 5, 2003	9781591821779
5th Shot - The Flower of Neverland; 6th shot - How to Steal Time; 7th shot - The Clockwork Grape; 8th shot - The Most Dangerous Cargo; 9th shot - Incandescent Memories; Jing: King of Bandits Initial Setup Collection (2)
The battle with Jing and Mastergear continues when Sherry discovers Jing's weakness. Jing and Kir split, and Jing makes a quick get away by hanging on a pendulum. Sherry locates him quickly, but before Mastergear can strike a final blow, Jing is saved by Mirabelle. Jing and Kir wake up in Neverland, where they meet the one-handed Captain and his gang of tardiness escapees. It is not long before Mastergear sends Clockodile to kill the troupe, starting with Mirabelle. When Clockodile kidnaps Mirabelle, however, Jing tracks them down and kills the monster, as well as leaving a note for Mastergear. Jing returns Mirabelle to Captain's gang, and sets out to steal time, on his way evading the Eggnog team, a group of renegade roosters. When Mastergear wakes from his somewhat pleasant sleep, he finds the clocks stopped, and flower petals are floating from the hour glass, which is the town's power source. He destroys the glass and everyone in town goes crazy, giving Jing enough time to get to the clock tower, which holds what he had come for. Captain and the gang show up and open the door with a key made to fit Captain's missing hand, and Jing leads Mirabelle through the tower, which is filled with giant grape vines. Once finding the clockwork grape's "Wild Bunch", a bunch looking like crystals, Mirabelle aids Jing when Mastergear ambushes them. Jing and Masterdear fight on the final level of the clock tower, Jing coming out the victor. Sherry leaves Mastergear's side and he is crushed beneath the tower. Jing, Mirabelle, and Kir make it out in time, and Jing leaves without saying a word. Jing then plans to travel to Sungaria carrying a cage of Porvoras, nature's dynamite. He meets Izarra, a gunslinging woman out for revenge on the owner of the Sungaria mountains, which is not to Jing or Kir's knowledge. They travel across the solar system of towns and cities until they reach the Venus Source, a crater filled with a type of memory alloy, with only one way across, a small road that goes straight across. Jing loses two of the remaining three Porvora (the fourth one fell from a bridge and exploded) to the magma-like alloy, which blows the road, forcing Jing to come up with another form of transportation through the metal. After some toil, he gets across, the remaining Porvora on his back, Kir following close behind.
3	November 6, 1996	4-06-321790-6	December 9, 2003	9781591821786
10th shot - The Goddess of Sungaria; 11th shot - Country of Tears; 12th shot - Town of Eternal Life; 13th shot - Lips of an Old Woman; 14th shot - Seven Colors of Ascension; Initial Set-up Collection (3)
Jing shows up at a Sungarian mine with the Porvora baby in tow and decides to poke through Baron Goblet's library for information on the Sun Stone—but Izarra has her own agenda that might interrupt Jing's plans. Jing then leaves to the City of Corpse, which abruptly loses the crown of its new king. While escaping from the castle, Jing meets Vermouth, an eccentric girl with promises of immortality in an undying city. To find it he has to solve the riddles leading to its location, before the pedantic Pernod and China Lilet can beat him to it.
4	May 2, 1997	4-06-321807-4	January 13, 2004	9781591821793
15th shot - Seventh Heaven; 16th shot - Prison of Dreams; 17th shot - A Sneeze From the Sun; 18th shot - The Hometown's Whereabouts; Extra Shot 1 - Amarcord First Volume; Extra Shot 2 - Amarcord Last Volume; Initial Set-up Collection (4)
Jing is incarcerated in the infamous prison known as Seventh Heaven, warded by Maraschino, who has never let a prisoner escape—and who seems to believe that he is either Batman or a vampire. However, Jing is not long in finding Campari, a conjuror who created a dream orb that could crystallize dreams, so that anyone could experience them. Campari does not want to give up the dream orb, and places Jing inside a dream world of Campari's own making, a little more than Jing's freedom is on the line. In the Extra Shot, the story of how Jing and Kir met for the first time is told.
5	August 1, 1997	4-06-321813-9	2004	9781591824664
19th shot - Zaza's Masquerade; 20th shot - Vintage Smile; 21st shot - The Warrior of the Rising Sun; 22nd shot - At the End of a Desperate Struggle; 23rd shot - Tears of an Unmasked Face; 24th shot - Waltz of the Wind; King of Bandits Crime Report
The city of Zaza is famous worldwide for its annual masquerade, but when Jing arrives it has been turned into the infamous mascorrida, thanks to the bitterness of Countess Dubonnet. Jing is more intent on stealing the Duchess' Vintage Smile than the throne of Zaza, but when a mysterious warrior enters the masked competition, it may be all Jing can do to hold on to his life.
6	November 6, 1997	4-06-321822-8	May 11, 2004	9781591824671
25th shot - Electricity Killed the Cat; 26th shot - The Sea in the Sky; 27th shot - The Navel's True Nature; 28th shot - A Colossus of Clouds; 29th shot - Lights Out; 30th shot - Mother Ocean; Initial Set-up Collection (5)
A gambling game with batteries instead of chips, a smoke bomb, and Jing's on his way with a map to the fabled Fuzzy Navel, the "reputed residence of God Himself." But when Kirsche, leader of a feline band of rebels against the city's restrictive electricity laws, decides Jing is in her way, things get tricky. And Pesca Luminosa does not appreciate the thought of someone disrupting his godly kingdom, especially not Jing. After all, only girls are good for sacrifices in Fuzzy Navel . . .
7	June 1, 1998	4-06-321841-4	July 6, 2004	9781591824688
31st shot - Girl On Auction; 32nd shot - Black Market; 33rd shot - Crimson Lake; 34th shot - The Fifth Element; 35th shot - Burning House of Ice River; 36th shot - Full Color Cemetery; 37th shot - White Tapestry; Crime Report - Second Edition
When Jing and Kir kidnap a forty-thousand dollar girl in the city of Pompier they wind up on the run from Monsieur Drambuie, an avid art collector determined to get his "merchandise" back. However, Fino is the daughter of the famous artist Vin Quart as well as one of his works, and with her help Jing and Kir might be able to find the famous Le Chef-d'Ouvre Inconnu, Quart's final piece.

==== Twilight Tales ====
No.	Original release date	Original ISBN	English release date	English ISBN
1	December 14, 1999	4-06-334362-6	September 7, 2004	9781591824695
1st Shot - Les Enfants Du Paradis - Part One; 2nd Shot - Les Enfants Du Paradis - Part Two; 3rd Shot - The Patchwork City; 4th Shot - God's Brain
As a boy, Jing visits the city of Czarine, the Ore Castle City, to steal a very special crystal—while trying to avoid Kümmel's goons, known as Tovarisch. Then an older Jing steals inside the City of Rusty Nail, best known for its medicine and amazing feats of surgery. The head doctor of the city, Dr. Uryan, is renowned for saving lives with his holy body grafting technique . . . but Jing is more interested in one of Uryan's oldest patients: the Shinku, the Holy Brain of God. Perhaps with some help from the lovely nurse Shin Lu, it will be possible...
2	July 18, 2000	4-06-334363-4	December 7, 2004	9781591824701
5th Shot - The Lady of Roentgen Street; 6th Shot - The Power of Holy Body Grafting; 7th Shot - Thirty-Four Pursuers; 8th Shot - A Medicine Called Freedom; 9th Shot - The End of Judgement; 10th Shot - The Naked World; Unpublished Story - Joshua Tree; Gameboy Sketches
Dr. Uryan doesn't appreciate Jing meddling in his affairs, and has sent the horrific patchworked Bloody Caesar after the thief to bring him down. In the meantime, the Shinku tires of its shelter from the outside world, and decides to experience it directly for itself—using Shin Lu's body!
3	March 21, 2001	4-06-334364-2	March 15, 2005	9781591824718
11th Shot - Coronation of the Lost King; 12th Shot - The Truth About the Recipe; 13th Shot - Expiration Date of a Bride; 14th Shot - Revolution In the Kitchen; 15th Shot - Evil Ingredients; 16th Shot - The Blessing of the Horn; 17th Shot - The Silent Banquet; Gameboy Sketches
In the White Night Desert, life is hard and faith is strong. And when Grenadine's younger sister Sugar is chosen to be an ingredient in the Millennium Stew, it's accepted without question. There's just one problem: Sugar is Kir's wife?!
4	December 21, 2001	4-06-334365-0	June 7, 2005	9781595324177
18th shot - Love Tax Evader; 19th shot - Mass in the Fog; 20th shot - Eternally Brokenhearted; 21st shot - Love Paid; 22nd shot - Accidental Accomplices; 23rd shot - Where Fog is Born; 24th shot - La Vie en Rose; Gameboy Sketches
Jing and Kir arrive in the funeral district of Moulin Rouge—and are immediately commanded to pay a 'love tax'! When Agent Anisette attempts to apprehend our criminal, Jing figures the fastest way out of the mess is to take her with him! On the run from the law in the fog-laden city, evading the officers commanded by mayor Lord Borus, Jing reveals his hidden agenda: to steal the Parfait d'Amour, the largest grave marker in existence!
5	January 21, 2003	4-06-334375-8	2005	9781595324184
25th shot - Crime of Passion; 26th shot - The Graveyard of Memories; 27th shot - The Answer to the Riddle; 28th shot - The Wind of Time; 29th shot - The First and Last Question; Extra Shot - Jing el Sur
Lord Borus is pushed closer and closer to confronting the past he kept hidden behind the Parfait d'Amour as Jing continues to run wild through Moulin Rouge. Anisette has been charged as Jing's accomplice in theft and love tax evasion, and everything comes to a head in the city's fog. In the Extra Shot, Jing reflects on an old friend he met in New Alcohol Bottle City, and the impact they had on each other's lives.
6	March 10, 2004	4-06-334376-6	December 13, 2005	9781595324191
30th shot - The Merry Widow Banquet; 31st shot - The Silent Flower; 32nd shot - Melody of Malady; 33rd shot - Rhapsody in Blue; 34th shot - Optimum Variation
Merry Widow has been a place of music and song since the Grammar War, but Jing's intent on an instrument that's heard but not seen—the Invisible. Rumour is the composer Eyguebelle is connected to it somehow, and Alize promises she can help them get to it. But is it really the best idea to pair up with a girl who wants to assassinate the man they're trying to find?
7	July 22, 2005	4-06-334385-5	2006	9781427802361
35th shot - At the Bottom of the Black Velvet
Upon stealing the Holy Suit, Jing and Kir find themselves in a ghost town trapped in eternal night. Once a prosperous city renowned for its clothing productions, it became known as the Capital of Clothes and Ruin after perishing in a night of blue flames. With the help from the mysterious flower princess Picon, Jing travels through this city of velvet darkness in search for the truth of a time long past.

=== Anime ===
==== Anime episodes ====
No.	Title	Original release date
1	"1st Shot: The Capital of Thieves" (Japanese: 1st SHOT: ドロボウの都)	May 15, 2002
The first episode takes place in a town called the Capital of Thieves, as Jing and Kir attempt to steal the mysterious Double Mermaid jewels, which in actuality are living beings. The Double Mermaid is kept at the top of a large tower that the tyrant in charge of the town has constructed. Many thieves have died trying to get to the top of this tower. Eventually Jing is able to make a giant bird angry enough to grow wings and fly him to the top of the tower. The item that Jing steals is the jewel that was created by the mother's and daughter's tears mingled together.
2	"2nd Shot: The Ghost Ship of Blue Hawaii" (Japanese: 2nd SHOT: ブルーハワイの幽霊船)	May 22, 2002
The second episode involves a trip to a town called Blue Hawaii and a rumored Ghost Ship that lies off its coast. The ship in reality is a casino powered by greed and desire, whose power source Jing steals. The Jing girl in this episode is Rose the daughter of Chief Police in the city, and whose father is trapped in the Casino of Greed. In the casino/boat Jing and Kir amass a lot of money, winning every game they participate in. Eventually the operator of this casino takes notice to them. Jing ends up figuring out that the casino's inhabitants are in reality lost souls consumed by greed and trapped in the gold coins. He defeats the gold coins because as the King of Bandits he is able to control his own desires and not fuel their power. This is apparently the source of Jing's true power as the bandit king. At the end of the episode Rose gives Jing a kiss. Postinos Riddle: The Ghost Ship runs on Greed and Desire.
3	"3rd Shot: The Adonis Capital of Time (Part 1)" (Japanese: 3rd SHOT: 時の都アドニス 前編)	May 29, 2002
The third episode involves the town of Adonis. The town is run by time. Jing and Kir defeat the guards at the entrance and rescue a girl named Mirabelle from being executed. The main crime in this town is being late. If you are 5 seconds late, the punishment is execution. After they save Mirabelle they are chased by the Master of the town. Mirabelle saves them by showing them to a place called Neverland for refugees.
4	"4th Shot: The Adonis Capital of Time (Part 2)" (Japanese: 4th SHOT: 時の都アドニス 後編)	June 5, 2002
This is the second part of the two-part chapter in Jing: King of Bandits. Mirabelle brought the two to the Neverland and as turns out, are being hunted by Adonis, wanted for many time-related crimes. Jing devised a plan to infiltrate the castle and stop the time clock, thus, stealing Adonis's "time". In the end Adonis was put to an end and Jing got to try the Pure "Clockwork Grape".
5	"5th Shot: The Little Girl from Technicolor Town" (Japanese: 5th SHOT: 色彩都市の少女)	June 12, 2002
The fifth episode has Jing and Kir help a young daughter of an artist complete his final work of art before his death.
6	"6th Shot: The Eternal City Of Reviva (Part 1)" (Japanese: 6th SHOT: 不死の都リヴァイヴァ 前編)	June 19, 2002
Jing and Kir start off by crashing the party of a baby prince at his castle and soon hear about a city, Reviva, whose people hold the secret to eternal life. The two set off with this episode's Jing-girl, Vermouth, to find the city. They are pursued the entire time by a duo also seeking the secret to eternal life, a scholar called Pernod (eerily similar to Malcolm MacDowell in the movie Clockwork Orange) and his well-built lackey, China Lilet. They pursue the three at a distance most of the time and more often than not just follow in the footsteps of Jing when solving puzzles or overcoming obstacles. The episode closes, to be continued in episode 7, shortly after Jing and his companions battle a skeleton who is cursed to drink wine for all eternity, only to have it spill back into the barrel again. The skeleton thanks them for freeing him from his curse and goes to spread his cape and stand on a small boat to act as a sail. Postino's Riddle: "Yeah, I deliver letters for them sometimes. But you know, I've never seen an obituary come out of that town."
7	"7th Shot: The Eternal City Of Reviva (Part 2)" (Japanese: 7th SHOT: 不死の都リヴァイヴァ 後編)	June 26, 2002
Jing, Kir and Vermouth continue on their sail boat to the city of Reviva, which has long been abandoned by its citizens and is inhabited only by the king, who still guards the water of eternal life. He congratulates Jing, whom he calls "The Minstrel," for coming so far and tells him of his plan to make Jing the new king of Reviva. Vermouth is injured in a battle with Leviathon, a giant fish that the king has been pursuing for ages, and is, to the great surprise of Jing and Kir, repaired by the king. The king apparently constructed her for the purpose of finding a new king. Jing and his companions are then drawn into battle with the scholar and his lackey, who has been modified by the scholar with robotic parts and a remote-control. In the end, the scholar and his lackey are tangled up and forced into becoming part of a perpetual motion machine and Jing pours out the water of eternal life, stating that shining for only a second is better than living a dull grey life for all of eternity. Postino's Riddle: None, this episode is the second in a series. See Episode 6.
8	"8th Shot: Don't Drop the Por Vora" (Japanese: 8th SHOT: 爆弾生物ポルヴォーラ)	July 3, 2002
Jing and Kir go on a quest to find the lost Sun Stone and pick up a shipment of two Por Vora along the way. In addition to dangerous and magical environments, the Por Vora are explosive. Jing and Kir hook up with this episode's Jing-girl, Izarra, and just narrowly make it to their destination, Sungria, with just one Por Vora. The other sacrifices itself to save the others. Jing uses his typically inexplicable knowledge of treasure to reveal the Sun Stone using the Mercury Stone to activate it. Izarra adopts the Por Vora as Jing and Kir vanish into the clouds, hitching a ride on the rising Sun Stone. Postino's Riddle: "I'm not permitted to handle dangerous creatures like the Por Vora. I'm prohibited from delivering radioactive or poisonous cargo." This is not necessarily a riddle, but reinstates what has already been mentioned about the Por Vora's dangerous nature.
9	"9th Shot: The Musical Island of Coco-Oco" (Japanese: 9th SHOT: 調べの島ココ·オコ)	July 17, 2002
Jing and Kir travel to the musical island of Coco-Oco. At the beginning of the episode, Kir becomes irritated with Jing and goes off on his own. Kir almost drowns but is saved by Mimosa, this episode's Jing girl. Jing goes off on his own to investigate the rumor of the Ocarina of the Moon. Mimosa goes to a cave on the island to watch the guy she likes called Russian playing a flute. Most of the rest of the episode is spent developing her character and their relation. At the end of the episode, Kir gets Jing to show up to save Russian from the collapsed cave, where all four find that the Ocarina of the Moon was in fact the moon shining beautifully through the cave like music. Mimosa and Russian have a cute little scene at the end and Kir and Jing settle their argument. Jing reflects that "this is one thing we can never steal". Jing and Kir leave on the train heading for Zaza.
10	"10th Shot: The Lullaby of the Por Vora" (Japanese: 10th SHOT: ポルヴォーラの子守歌)	July 24, 2002
Jing finds the secret Por Vora city Bluwari and is invited to stay there forever but he declines. A trio of criminals infiltrate the building and hack into a room 'that should not be opened' and thus the self-destruct mechanism was turned on to ensure that the Por Vora secret never leaked out.
11	"11th Shot: The Masquerade Ball of ZaZa (Part 1)" (Japanese: 11th SHOT: ザザの仮面舞踏会 前編)	July 31, 2002
Jing and Kir are in ZaZa planning to attend what was thought of as a masquerade ball, but it turns out the sign read "Mas Corrida", and corrida is a bullfighting term. Suddenly, Jing and Kir are in the middle of a nationwide masked gladiator tournament to determine the new Earl of ZaZa and receive the Vintage Smile, a pearl white mask Jing came to steal. Jing finds out from Angostura Sr., that Madame DuBonnet didn't mourn for the loss of her husband, but was severely crushed when her only son, Lemon, was murdered by his uncle. The Madame grew cold and heartless, and ordered these tournaments to force everyone to fight until no warrior is left standing. Her main targets are the D'Ice Brothers: Baffle, Crash and Cube, the three who assassinated Lemon. After humiliating an opponent in true bandit fashion, Jing witnesses Cube's devastating defeat at the hands of a mysterious warrior in blood-red armor and demon motifs.
12	"12th Shot: The Masquerade Ball of ZaZa (Part 2)" (Japanese: 12th SHOT: ザザの仮面舞踏会 中編)	August 7, 2002
Jing has advanced into the Black Corrida, which is the final stages of battle. During the time, more plotting from the D'Ice Brothers are in the works to take the role of Earl by force, while Jing plots his own caper. Miss Stir unexpectedly comes across Jing while walking through the palace, but she didn't notice him as the King of Bandits. After defeating Crash, Jing finds himself surrounded by all three D'Ice Brothers, but one Kir Royale later and the brothers get blasted. Having escaped the D'Ice Brothers' wrath, Jing finds himself face to face with the demonic warrior who brutalized Cube who is simply known as "The Warrior of the Rising Son".
13	"13th Shot: The Masquerade Ball of ZaZa (Part 3)" (Japanese: 13th SHOT: ザザの仮面舞踏会 後編)	August 14, 2002
The fight continued on until the night with Jing and the red-armored warrior matching each other blow for blow. Just as Jing disarms the warrior's sword, Cube smashes the warrior to gain vengeance. The armor shatters and to everyone's shock, it revealed Miss Stir! Before anyone can act, Jing carried Stir and jumped towards the Madame's balcony so she can rest. Baffle suddenly captures Jing and hopes to execute him, but Angostura halts Baffle letting him know the law in ZaZa. Jing, ever so crafty, decides to have one more battle with Baffle. However, before the match, he switched masks and clothes with Angostura in order to reach Stir and the Vintage Smile. During Stir's rest, the cold-hearted Madame cried and took off her mask revealing her face. Then, everything in ZaZa was back to normal. Jing got the Vintage Smile while his friend Ginjou got everything else. However, Baffle was on Jing's trail and Jing finally put an end to the D'Ice Brothers' evil with a Kir Royale blast. Afterwards, Kir started to get that look in Jing's eye that something happened between him and Stir. When the masquerade ball was back to dancing instead of fighting, Stir put off every man who wanted to dance with her so she can save the first dance for Jing.

==== Jing, King of Bandits: Seventh Heaven OVA episodes ====
No.	Title	Original release date
1	"Lost in Seventh Heaven"	January 21, 2004
Jing and Kir are thrown into the infamous prison known as Seventh Heaven. Jing has allowed himself to be captured because his next target is an item called a Dream Orb, which the prisoner Campari can craft from a person's dreams to allow another person to experience those dreams. When Jing leaves his cell he gets entangled in an illusion when he encounters Campari.
2	"Dream in Seventh Heaven"	March 10, 2004
Jing has been put in solitary confinement. Campari gives him a dream of the past and Jing flashes back to when he and Kir, still in his egg, met for the first time when they save a girl who has been kidnapped by the Forest Spirit.
3	"Awake in Seventh Heaven"	April 28, 2004
Jing turns the tables on Campari and finds clues to Campari's past, the lost village of Acacia and the girl who promised to marry him. Eventually Jing fights the Warden and Campari helps him to escape.

== Reception ==
The manga and anime got mixed reviews from English speaking critics. Animefringe called the manga imaginative and humorous. Allen Divers felt the series played its one trick pony to the hilt and had generic artwork. Jeffrey Harris of IGN praised the story of Jing's past. A review in The Escapist complained about static characters, flimsy plot, and poorly-directed action sequences. Theron Martin praised the OVA series for its creative visual design and energetic musical score. Jonathan Clements noted that Jing was a series "which nobody really watched".
