= Medabots Infinity =

2003 video game

- PAL region cover art
- Developer(s): Natsume Co., Ltd.
- Publisher(s): JP: Natsume Co., Ltd.; NA/PAL: Natsume Inc.
- Composer(s): Iku Mizutani
- Platform(s): GameCube
- Release: JP: November 28, 2003; NA: December 14, 2003; PAL: September 24, 2004
- Genre(s): Role-playing
- Mode(s): Single-player, multiplayer

Medabots Infinity, known in Japan as Medarot Brave (メダロットBRAVE, Medarotto Brave), is a 2003 role-playing video game developed by Natsume Co., Ltd. The game is based on the Medabots series. It is the sequel to Medabots.

Hooking up to the Metabee and Rokusho Game Boy Advance games allows for secret unlockable medabots: Arcbeetle (Metabee) and Mega-Emperor (Rokusho). While the GBA link option is inaccessible in the EU version, there's a screenshot of it in the game's EU instruction manual.

== Plot ==
Some of Riverview City's kids have apparently gone missing. The Rubberobo Gang may be responsible, so it's up to Ikki to stop them again.

== Gameplay ==
The game is divided into an overworld and stages, in which there are arenas, viewed from a 3D perspective. There are two types of missions in arenas the player must do to complete a stage: Robattling all the enemies or a Robattle one on one.

== Reception ==
Reception

Aggregate score
Aggregator	Score
Metacritic	51/100

Review scores
Publication	Score
Famitsu	25/40
GameSpot	5.4/10
NGC Magazine	19%
Nintendo Power	3.1/5

The game received "mixed" reviews according to the review aggregation website Metacritic. Bethany Massimilla of GameSpot said, "Medabots fans wanting a fix are far better off watching the cartoon instead." In Japan, however, Famitsu gave it a score of one seven and three sixes for a total of 25 out of 40.
