= Medabots AX: Metabee and Rokusho =

- Developer: Natsume Co., Ltd.
- Publisher: Natsume Inc.
- Series: Medabots
- Platform: Game Boy Advance
- Release: NA: June 25, 2002; EU: August 2, 2002
- Genre: Fighting
- Modes: Single-player, multiplayer

Medabots AX: Metabee version and Medabots AX: Rokusho version are spin-off fighting games of the Medabots series, developed by Natsume Co., Ltd. and published by Natsume Inc..

Metabots AX was never released in Japan; instead an almost identical version called Medarot G was released. Both AX versions were re-released via the Wii U Virtual Console in North America on February 25, 2016, and in Europe on May 11, 2015.

== Plot ==
Ikki Tenryou and his Medabot, Metabee or Rokusho, enter a tournament to win the ultimate Medabot.

== Gameplay ==
The gameplay of Medabots AX is different to that of previous instalments of the series as it is more of a platform fighting game much like Digimon Battle Spirit. Though much like the previous games, the player constructs their own Medabots using pieces won from battles. The player controls the leader Medabot and utilises various Medabot pieces and special abilities to defeat the enemy.
