= The Many Sides of Voice Actor Radio =

Japanese light novel series and its franchise

- First light novel volume cover, featuring Yumiko Sato as Yasumi Utatane

声優ラジオのウラオモテ (Seiyū Rajio no Ura Omote)
- Genre: Comedy; Coming-of-age; Yuri
- Light novel
- Written by: Kō Nigatsu
- Illustrated by: Saba Mizore
- Published by: ASCII Media Works
- Imprint: Dengeki Bunko
- Original run: February 7, 2020 – present
- Volumes: 15 + 1 short story
- Manga
- Written by: Kō Nigatsu
- Illustrated by: Umemi Makimoto
- Published by: ASCII Media Works
- Imprint: Dengeki Comics Next
- Magazine: Dengeki Maoh (2020–2025); KadoComi (2025–2026)
- Original run: March 27, 2020 – January 3, 2026
- Volumes: 6
- Anime television series
- Directed by: Hideki Tachibana
- Produced by: Chiaki Kondou; Hiroshi Anami; Natsumi Tamura; Yuki Ogasawara; Akira Kubota; Shuka Nishimame; Fumihiro Ozawa
- Written by: Keiichirō Ōchi
- Music by: Keiichi Hirokawa; Kuniyuki Takahashi
- Studio: Connect
- Licensed by: Crunchyroll: SEA: Plus Media Networks Asia
- Original network: AT-X, Tokyo MX, BS NTV
- Original run: April 10, 2024 – June 26, 2024
- Episodes: 12
- icon

The Many Sides of Voice Actor Radio (Japanese: 声優ラジオのウラオモテ, Hepburn: Seiyū Rajio no Ura Omote) is a Japanese light novel series written by Kō Nigatsu and illustrated by Saba Mizore. It began publication in February 2020 under ASCII Media Works' Dengeki Bunko imprint. As of June 2026, fifteen volumes have been released. A manga adaptation illustrated by Umemi Makimoto was serialized in ASCII Media Works' seinen manga magazine Dengeki Maoh from March 2020 to April 2025, and in Kadokawa's KadoComi website from May 2025 to January 2026; its chapters were collected into six tankōbon volumes. An anime television series adaptation produced by Connect aired from April to June 2024.

== Plot ==
Yumiko Sato is a gyaru high school student who secretly works as a voice actress under the stage name Yasumi Utatane. One day, she has a hostile encounter with a quiet and reserved classmate named Chika Watanabe. When she lands a role to co-host a radio program, Yumiko discovers her partner is none other than Chika, who also secretly works as a voice actress under the stage name Yuhi Yugure. While they are friendly on the program, off air, they constantly bicker with each other. The story follows their tumultuous relationship.

== Characters ==
Yasumi Utatane (歌種 やすみ, Utatane Yasumi) / Yumiko Sato (佐藤 由美子, Satō Yumiko)
Voiced by: Miku Itō
A gyaru high school student and a voice actress. Her dad died when she was young and she was raised by her mother and grandmother.
Yuhi Yugure (夕暮 夕陽, Yūgure Yūhi) / Chika Watanabe (渡辺 千佳, Watanabe Chika)
Voiced by: Moe Toyota
Yumiko's classmate and the co-host of their radio show. She became a voice actress to reach her father, who divorced her mother when she was young.
Otome Sakuranamiki (桜並木 乙女, Sakuranamiki Otome)
Voiced by: Ikumi Hasegawa
Mekuru Yubisaki (柚日咲 めくる, Yubisaki Mekuru)
Voiced by: Nao Tōyama
Ringo Kagasaki (加賀崎 りんご, Kagasaki Ringo)
Voiced by: Ami Koshimizu
Mirei Asaka (朝加 美玲, Asaka Mirei)
Voiced by: Misato Fukuen
Wakana Kawagishi (川岸 若菜, Kawagishi Wakana)
Voiced by: Miyuri Shimabukuro

== Media ==
=== Light novel ===
Written by Kō Nigatsu and illustrated by Saba Mizore, The Many Sides of Voice Actor Radio began its publication on February 7, 2020, under ASCII Media Works' Dengeki Bunko imprint. Starting with volume sixteen, the series will only be released digitally. As of June 2026, fifteen volumes have been released.

Its spin-off novel short stories Seiyū Radio no Ura Omote DJCD was serialized on Dengeki Bunko's website Dengeki Novecomi+ from October 30, 2023, to January 1, 2024. It was released in a single volume with illustrations by Umemi Makimoto on April 10, 2024.

==== Main series ====
No.	Title	Japanese release date	Japanese ISBN
1	Yūhi to Yasumi wa Kakushikirenai? (夕陽とやすみは隠しきれない？)	February 7, 2020	978-4-04-913021-8
2	Yūhi to Yasumi wa Akiramekirenai? (夕陽とやすみは諦めきれない？)	June 10, 2020	978-4-04-913203-8
3	Yūhi to Yasumi wa Tsukinuketai? (夕陽とやすみは突き抜けたい？)	November 10, 2020	978-4-04-913491-9
4	Yūhi to Yasumi wa Chikara ni Naritai? (夕陽とやすみは力になりたい？)	February 10, 2021	978-4-04-913499-5
5	Yūhi to Yasumi wa Otona ni Narenai? (夕陽とやすみは大人になれない？)	July 9, 2021	978-4-04-913860-3
6	Yūhi to Yasumi wa Ōkiku Naritai? (夕陽とやすみは大きくなりたい？)	December 10, 2021	978-4-04-914132-0
7	Yubisaki Mekuru wa Kakushikirenai? (柚日咲めくるは隠しきれない？)	June 10, 2022	978-4-04-914449-9
8	Yūhi to Yasumi wa Makerarenai? (夕陽とやすみは負けられない？)	January 7, 2023	978-4-04-914680-6
9	Yūhi to Yasumi wa Tanoshimitai? (夕陽とやすみは楽しみたい？)	December 8, 2023	978-4-04-915072-8
10	Yūhi to Yasumi wa Mitomeraretai? (夕陽とやすみは認められたい？)	April 10, 2024	978-4-04-915595-2
11	Yūhi to Yasumi wa Issho ni Irarenai? (夕陽とやすみは一緒にいられない？)	June 7, 2024	978-4-04-915597-6
12	Yūhi to Yasumi wa Yume o Mitai? (夕陽とやすみは夢を見たい？)	December 10, 2024	978-4-04-915988-2
13	Yūhi to Yasumi wa Michi o Erabitai? (夕陽とやすみは道を選びたい？)	July 10, 2025	978-4-04-916465-7
14	Yūhi to Yasumi wa Mukiaitai? (夕陽とやすみは向き合いたい？)	January 9, 2026	978-4-04-916761-0
15	Yūhi to Yasumi wa Kakushikirenai? (夕陽とやすみは隠しきれない！)	June 10, 2026	978-4-04-916887-7

==== Short stories ====
No.	Japanese release date	Japanese ISBN
DJCD	April 10, 2024	978-4-04-915138-1

=== Manga ===
A manga adaptation illustrated by Umemi Makimoto was originally serialized in ASCII Media Works' Dengeki Maoh magazine from March 27, 2020, to July 27, 2021. In July 2023, it was announced that the manga would restart serialization and continue to be illustrated by Makimoto. The series restarted serialization in Dengeki Maoh, publishing eleven chapters from December 26, 2023, to April 25, 2025. It continued in Kadokawa's KadoComi website on May 31, 2025, and ended on January 3, 2026. Its chapters were compiled in six tankōbon volumes, released from August 2020 to January 2026.

No.	Japanese release date	Japanese ISBN
1	August 26, 2020	978-4-04-913345-5
2	March 27, 2021	978-4-04-913699-9
3	September 27, 2021	978-4-04-914019-4
4	June 26, 2024	978-4-04-915760-4
5	May 27, 2025	978-4-04-916419-0
6	January 27, 2026	978-4-04-916881-5

=== Anime ===
An anime television series adaptation was announced on December 21, 2022. It was produced by Connect and directed by Hideki Tachibana, with scripts written by Keiichirō Ōchi, characters designed by Shoko Takimoto, who also served as chief animation director, and music composed by Keiichi Hirokawa and Kuniyuki Takahashi. The series aired from April 10 to June 26, 2024, on AT-X and other networks. The opening theme song is "Now On Air", performed by Miku Itō, and the ending theme song is "Stand by You", performed by Itō and Moe Toyota as their respective characters. Crunchyroll is streaming the series. Plus Media Networks Asia licensed the series in Southeast Asia.

==== Episodes ====
No.	Title (Note: All English titles are taken from Crunchyroll.)	Directed by (Note: Information is taken from the ending credits of each episode.)	Written by	Storyboarded by	Original release date
1	"Yuhi and Yasumi Can't Keep It Hidden?"; Transliteration: "Yūhi to Yasumi wa Kakushikirenai?" (Japanese: 夕陽とやすみは隠しきれない？)	Hideki Tachibana	Keiichirō Ōchi	Hideki Tachibana	April 10, 2024
A radio show hosted by Yuhi Yugure and Yasumi Utatane, titled Yuhi and Yasumi's High School Radio, begins airing. A month ago, Yasumi, whose real name is Yumiko Sato, struggled to get recognition despite being a voice actress for three years and attending high school, keeping her job a secret from others besides her mother. Yumiko's friend Wakana Kawagishi spotted one of their classmates, Kimura, bringing prints of Yuhi to school. Wakana then inadvertently bumped into another classmate of theirs, the quiet and reserved Chika Watanabe. When an annoyed Chika dismissed Yuhi's work, Yumiko confronted her. Later, Yumiko got a call from her manager on landing a gig for a radio show with Yuhi and met its director and scriptwriter Mirei Asaka. She then learned her partner was none other than Chika, resulting in tensions between the two. In the present, the director hands Yumiko and Chika an announcement that the next episode will be recorded in public. On the day of the public recording, Yumiko, after getting briefed by Mirei regarding Chika's nervousness, lends her a helping hand.
2	"Yuhi and Yasumi and the Group and" Transliteration: "Yūhi to Yasumi to Yunitto to" (Japanese: 夕陽とやすみとユニットと)	Ryūta Yamamoto	Keiichirō Ōchi	Hideki Tachibana	April 17, 2024
Yumiko and her mother eat breakfast as the latter listens in to her daughter's radio show. She discusses with Yumiko on finding out Chika's unfamiliarity with butcher shops selling croquettes humorous, which Yumiko points out was not a gag. Both girls head to the butcher shop and talk about not wanting to put up a facade with one another moving forward. Sometime later, Yumiko is notified by her manager Ringo Kagasaki that she has landed a new gig, this time an anime, being cast alongside her voice acting friend Otome Sakuranamiki and Chika; as part of the gig, they will also perform a song release event as Heart Tart. Yumiko and Chika meet Otome during work, and while elated at her presence, Yumiko notices Otome's exhaustion; as she observes her peers' performances, Yumiko begins having doubts with her own, but Chika commends her skills. During a final rehearsal for the release event, an exhausted Otome injures her foot, rendering her unable to perform. Not wanting to disappoint her fans, Yumiko and Chika reach a compromise with the staff to have Otome at the talking portions and perform the song without her. Both promise on reaching further heights as voice actresses.
3	"Yuhi and Yasumi and a Sleepover and" Transliteration: "Yūhi to Yasumi to Otomari to" (Japanese: 夕陽とやすみとお泊まりと)	Masahiko Suzuki	Keiichirō Ōchi	Hideki Tachibana	April 24, 2024
Kimura is seen gaining information and investigating how close to the proximity of his school Yuhi and Yasumi are. Meanwhile, expressing the intent for a sleepover on High School Radio, Yumiko and Chika head to the latter's apartment to do such. As they prepare to sleep, Yumiko and Chika reveal what got them into voice acting. The following morning, Yumiko meets Chika's mother. A few days later, Yumiko reads an article of Chika being cast in a high-profile role of a mecha anime, which fuels doubts and jealousy in her that is further exacerbated upon learning High School Radio will be ending soon due to being a commercial failure. Seeing Chika reacting to the news with indifference, a frustrated Yumiko calls her out. Once Chika leaves following recording, Yumiko breaks down in tears and is consoled by Mirei as she details Chika was also shocked by the news, showing that Chika did indeed enjoy working on the radio show. As such, Yumiko plans on apologizing to her the next day. However, she receives a call from Otome concerning a rumor that has spread of Chika gaining the mecha anime role through sexual means.
4	"Yuhi and Yasumi Can't Keep It Hidden"; Transliteration: "Yūhi to Yasumi wa Kakushikirenai" (Japanese: 夕陽とやすみは隠しきれない)	Geisei Morita	Keiichirō Ōchi	Hideki Tachibana	May 1, 2024
Running to school, Yumiko arrives at her classroom, concerned for Chika's safety. Kimura assures Yumiko and Wakana the student council would handle the situation, leading Yumiko to suspect he was the one who spread the rumor. Before making any move, the anti who actually spread it enters and records a livestream meant to degrade Chika. Yumiko demands the anti to stop the recording and is recognized by him; before he can direct the camera at her, Chika punches him and tearfully runs off, planning to quit voice acting altogether. Yumiko holds a livestream later that evening in an attempt to absolve Chika and expound on their behind-the-scenes relationship, even at the risk of ending her own career, and conveys her desire to work with Chika more. Chika and Kamishiro, the mecha anime director who is also revealed to be her father, soon join the livestream to clear up further misunderstandings. The livestream becomes a trending topic, resulting in High School Radio continuing and allowing Yumiko and Chika the opportunity to rebrand and talk using their real personalities.
5	"Yuhi and Yasumi Will Definitely Keep Going?"; Transliteration: "Yūhi to Yasumi wa Madamada Tsuzuku?" (Japanese: 夕陽とやすみはまだまだ続く？)	Geisei Morita	Yuka Yamada	Yūichi Nihei	May 8, 2024
In the aftermath of the casting couch incident, Chika's agency, Blue Crown, thanks Yumiko for helping her get back on her feet. Yumiko also meets Chika's manager Shuri Naruse and Blue Crown talent Mekuru Yubisaki, the latter treating Yumiko with scorn on how she handled the incident and taking offense with her and Chika using their real personalities on High School Radio. Ringo later shows Yumiko recordings of Mekuru's radio show, taking note of Mekuru's professionalism and suggesting she can take inspiration from her. Although High School Radio remains popular, the incident also caused Yumiko and Chika's high school to be swarmed by fans, leading them to alternative methods of escape. Chika also emphasizes to Yumiko how it caused many of her potential gigs to be called off and cancelled. Both of their managers call them for a strategy meeting on lifting back their careers through collaborations and guest appearances on various radio shows with the aid of Otome; one of their first appearances is on Mekuru's radio show, to Yumiko's horror.
6	"Yuhi and Yasumi Are Definitely Doomed?"; Transliteration: "Yūhi to Yasumi wa Zettaizetsumei?" (Japanese: 夕陽とやすみは絶体絶命？)	Ryūta Yamamoto	Yuka Yamada	Kunihisa Sugishima	May 15, 2024
Yumiko and Chika join an annoyed Mekuru on her radio show, and before recording, Mekuru calls both out on lying to their fans. Yumiko continues to be impressed with Mekuru's professionalism and wants to talk to her, but is only dismissed. A few days later, during a recording for their anime gig, Yumiko overhears the anime's executives voicing their dismay on being forced to use them due to the incident. Yumiko approaches Otome on her doubts, and Otome reassures her she has people she can rely on. Heading home from a High School Radio recording sometime later, Chika tells Yumiko her mother is waiting at Blue Crown, where they learn she plans to make Chika quit voice acting. Both voice actresses protest to the decision, leading Chika's mother to a compromise that if they talk to anyone while they head to the station, Chika will go on hiatus. As Yumiko explains her worries to her mother, Yumiko's mother arranges a meeting with Chika, her mother, and their managers and doubles the wager by having Yumiko also go on hiatus. Yumiko's mother, however, believes in her daughter's resolve, and Yumiko has no choice but to go along with it.
7	"Yuhi and Yasumi Just Can't Give Up"; Transliteration: "Yūhi to Yasumi wa Akiramekirenai" (Japanese: 夕陽とやすみは諦めきれない)	Takanori Yano	Yuka Yamada	Kazuhisa Takenouchi	May 22, 2024
Yumiko takes a despondent Chika on a hangout, where Chika expresses her fear of being forgotten if she goes on hiatus. Some days later at a Heart Tart fan meet, a masked girl arrives and passionately shows her adoration to the girls; as she shares her sadness to Yumiko in no longer seeing her Yasumi persona, Yumiko recognizes her as Mekuru. Yumiko and Chika learn that Mekuru is a longtime fan of theirs, and Mekuru elaborates her past behavior towards both voice actresses was due to being upset on them abandoning their previous personas after the incident without considering the feelings of their longtime fans. With this realization, Yumiko and Chika record a video to their fans where they communicate their remorse and announce the wager set the following day. As they walk towards the station, they get into close calls with longtime fans who felt betrayed by their actions, but other fans who continue to support them, including Mekuru, come to their defense and motivate them to continue voice acting, beating the wager. Sometime later, as Mekuru listens to High School Radio, she hears Yumiko and Chika use their previous personas, reacting with tears of joy.
8	"Yuhi and Yasumi and Displeasure and" Transliteration: "Yūhi to Yasumi to Fukigen to" (Japanese: 夕陽とやすみと不機嫌と)	Takumi Shibata	Keiichirō Ōchi	Takumi Shibata	May 29, 2024
A few weeks after beating the wager, Yumiko and Chika return to voice acting activities. Yumiko proceeds to audition for a role in an anime with sound director Sugishita screening her. A week later, Ringo tells Yumiko she was offered an antagonist role in Kamishiro's mecha anime at Sugushita's request. A surprised Yumiko is given a short time to practice her audition. She soon passes the audition, and once Chika gets wind of it, she becomes distant from Yumiko. When Yumiko finds out what has been bothering Chika, she realizes she is dialing up their rivalry. Yumiko later joins in a recording session with Chika, observing the cast as she nervously waits for her cue. As they rest, Sugushita gives feedback to Yumiko on toning down her character's sense of inferiority, resulting in Yumiko spacing out as her doubts gradually seep into her performance during retakes. After wrapping up, a defeated Yumiko encounters Chika; Yumiko assures her she has time to improve. Chika is left disappointed in Yumiko's performance and excuses. Afterwards, Yumiko laments what happened.
9	"Yuhi and Yasumi and Christmas"; Transliteration: "Yūhi to Yasumi to Kurisumasu" (Japanese: 夕陽とやすみとクリスマス)	Geisei Morita	Yuka Yamada	Hideki Tachibana	June 5, 2024
Yumiko meets with Ringo for feedback on her voice acting, where Ringo advises Yumiko to understand her character's emotions and balance her workload. On Christmas Eve, Wakana invites Yumiko and the class to a karaoke hangout; Yumiko also invites a reluctant Chika along. Reaching the karaoke lounge, the class begins taking turns in sessions; as Yumiko notices Chika being quiet, she takes the opportunity to sing one of her songs, leading an annoyed Chika to respond similarly in earnest, later leading to a duet with Yumiko. Chika invites Yumiko later that night where Chika gifts her DVDs of the mecha anime to use as references for her acting. A few days later, Yumiko heads to the recording session and after understanding her character more and watching the mecha anime Chika gifted her, she gives a better voice performance, earning positive feedback from her costars and Sugishita, who reminds her she can be able to go further. Yumiko requests if she can stay and re-record her lines from the previous session, and Sugishita agrees, with the rest of the cast following suit. Yumiko thanks Chika for her gesture.
10	"Yuhi and Yasumi and Mekuru and Otome"; Transliteration: "Yūhi to Yasumi to Mekuru to Otome" (Japanese: 夕陽とやすみとめくると乙女)	Ryūta Yamamoto	Yuka Yamada	Kunihisa Sugishima	June 12, 2024
A collaboration event between the radio shows of Yumiko and Chika, Mekuru, and Otome is held that pits each host in competitive games with a cash prize awarded to whoever scores the most points, with Yumiko and Chika confident in winning; the prize is awarded to Otome by the end. Mekuru wonders why Yumiko and Chika wanted to win, and both voice actresses expressed on wanting to use the prize to hold a wrap party for Mekuru as thanks. Although initially glad their plot did not come to fruition, Mekuru is nevertheless surprised Otome invited them for the party. As Chika leaves ahead of the others, Yumiko talks with Mekuru and Otome for advice on improving her voice acting for the mecha anime. Otome points out how the role was new territory for Yumiko compared to her past roles, while Mekuru asks if she consults with Chika for her opinions given their working relationship. A doubtful Yumiko expresses not wanting to approach her rival for notes, but Otome reassures her she can approach Chika if she is ever in a slump.
11	"Yuhi and Yasumi Post-Recording and" Transliteration: "Yūhi to Yasumi to Afureko to" (Japanese: 夕陽とやすみとアフレコと)	Yuri Hagiwara & Susumu Yamamoto	Keiichirō Ōchi	Yūichi Nihei	June 19, 2024
Yumiko still holds doubt on her performance with the next episode's recording session being her last as her character is slated to die. One of her costars reminds her that the output of her performance will impact the anime's quality as a whole. Yumiko begins vigorously rehearsing her lines as she reflects while on air for High School Radio on still wanting to gain recognition despite doing the most she can. A week later on the day of her final recording session, Yumiko's doubts begin to flare up again as she is requested to do multiple retakes throughout the night before needing to wrap up and being asked to come the next day for a solo session. Yumiko looks back at how much she got to do work as a voice actress despite feeling she is getting nowhere, remembering how she started out after being inspired by her favorite anime and landing successful opportunities as a rising voice actress before stagnating. Refusing to give up against Chika after realizing meeting her brought back her passion, Yumiko approaches her for advice.
12	"Yuhi and Yasumi Want to Break Through"; Transliteration: "Yūhi to Yasumi wa Tsuki Nuketai" (Japanese: 夕陽とやすみは突き抜けたい)	Hideki Tachibana	Keiichirō Ōchi	Hideki Tachibana	June 26, 2024
Chika points out Yumiko's nervousness on working with veteran voice actors and advises her to be more confident in her abilities to reach her full potential. The next day, as Yumiko and Chika head for her solo recording session, Chika also tells Yumiko how she has been observing her holding back her acting and would want to see more effort. In the recording studio, Sugushita shares his reason in picking Yumiko for the antagonist role among voice actresses with better acting, believing she can go above and beyond with her performance. As the session reaches Yumiko and Chika's cue, Yumiko gives a surprising performance. Sugushita expresses his elation and gratitude for Yumiko's acting, which pleases her. Sometime later, Yumiko and Chika talk on their future business, acknowledging they each hold jealousy with the acting talents of the other, and address each other as rivals before heading off to record another episode of High School Radio.

== Reception ==
In 2019, Seiyū Radio no Ura Omote won the Grand Prize at the 26th Dengeki Novel Prize. The series ranked 15th in the bunkobon category and eighth in the new work category of the 2021 edition of Takarajimasha's Kono Light Novel ga Sugoi! guide book; it ranked 16th in the bunkobon category of the 2022 edition.

== See also ==
- Pyxis (idol unit)
- Butareba: The Story of a Man Turned into a Pig, the winner of the gold prize (effectively second place) of the 26th Dengeki Novel Prize
- I Kissed My Girlfriend's Little Sister?!, another light novel series illustrated by Saba Mizore
- The Dreaming Boy Is a Realist, another light novel series illustrated by Saba Mizore
