= List of Gundam Build Fighters Try episodes =

Cover of the first volume of the DVD release by Bandai Visual.

Gundam Build Fighters Try (Japanese: ガンダムビルドファイターズトライ, Hepburn: Gandamu Birudo Faitāzu Torai) is a 2014 Japanese science fiction anime television series based on Sunrise's long-running Gundam franchise, and a sequel to the 2013 series Gundam Build Fighters. Like its predecessor, and in contrast to other Gundam series, Gundam Build Fighters Try features a tournament-based storyline where Gunpla models are built, customized, and battled.

The series is directed by Shinya Watada and written by Yousuke Kuroda, who wrote the first series. Character designs were done by both Kenichi Ohnuki and Suzuhito Yasuda. The series was officially unveiled by Bandai on May 15, 2014, and began airing on TV Tokyo in Japan while streaming on YouTube in limited areas internationally on October 8, 2014. The first opening theme is "Cerulean" (セルリアン, Serurian) by Back-On, and the ending theme is "Amazing the World" (アメイジング ザ ワールド, Ameijingu za Wārudo) by Screen Mode. The second opening theme is "Just Fly Away" by Edge of Life, while the ending theme is "Mayomayo Compass wa Iranai" (迷々コンパスはいらない; "Stray People Do Not Need a Compass") by StylipS. Both songs debuted in episode 14.

== Episodes ==
No.	Title	Original release date
1	"The Boy Who Calls the Wind"; Transliteration: "Kaze wo Yobu Shōnen" (Japanese: 風を呼ぶ少年)	October 8, 2014
After being arrested for scaring a gang at a back alley with his martial arts skills, Sekai Kamiki arrives at Seiho Academy as a second-year transfer student. As the last remaining member of the Gunpla Battle Club struggling to form a team to participate in the upcoming Gunpla Battle Tournament, Fumina Hoshino convinces Sekai to join her club.
2	"Team Up, Try Fighters!"; Transliteration: "Kessei! Torai Faitāzu" (Japanese: 結成！トライ・ファイターズ)	October 15, 2014
Sekai is transferred to the same class as Yuuma. Meanwhile, Sekai and Fumina must battle Miyaga, Yuuma, and Eri Hoshino in a two-on-three battle to save the Gunpla Battle Club from being absorbed into the Plamo Club.
3	"Her Name Is Gyanko"; Transliteration: "Sono na wa Gyanko" (Japanese: その名はギャン子)	October 22, 2014
The Try Fighters have their first practice game with a female trio from Saint Odessa Girls' School.
4	"G-Muse"; Transliteration: "Jī Myūzu" (Japanese: Gミューズ)	October 29, 2014
Word spreads quickly of the Try Fighters' victory over the Song Dynasty Vase team, which has other teams on edge. Meanwhile, as the Try Fighters practice for the West Division qualifiers, Fumina takes Sekai on a date to G-Muse, a Gundam museum and shopping center. There, they encounter an arrogant Gunpla builder from Osaka.
5	"Dream and Challenge in Your Heart"; Transliteration: "Akogare to Chōsen wo Mune ni" (Japanese: 憧れと挑戦を胸に)	November 5, 2014
Following his humiliating defeat at the hands of Minato Sakai, Sekai struggles to adapt his Jigen Haoh School techniques in different environments while Yuuma upgrades his Lightning Gundam. Meanwhile, Fumina reveals her inspiration for taking up Gunpla Battle as a hobby, and she completes her latest Gunpla just in time for the qualifying tournament.
6	"Ruler of the Battlefield"; Transliteration: "Senjō no Shihai-sha" (Japanese: 戦場の支配者)	November 12, 2014
Shortly after winning their first battle, the Try Fighters face Team SRSC, which is favored to win the championship. Certain that they cannot win in their current condition, Fumina decides to reveal the secret power of the Winning Gundam.
7	"Straight-Assembly Shimon"; Transliteration: "Sugomi no Shimon" (Japanese: 素組みのシモン)	November 19, 2014
The Try Fighters make it to the quarterfinals, but have to face a rookie team that relies on straight-builds - Gunpla kits that are built straight out of the box without any touch-ups. The team's leader is Shimon Izuna, a former boxing champion who proves that a fighter's raw skill can outperform any opponent with a snap-fit Gunpla, and Sekai and his partners' resolve is tested when Shimon's teammates beg them to concede their match for the sake of his younger brother.
8	"Upon This Shield"; Transliteration: "Kono Tate ni Chikatte" (Japanese: この盾に誓って)	November 26, 2014
The time comes for the semifinals and Song Dynasty Vase takes on G-Master. Gyanko is determined to face against Sekai in the others in the finals, until the West Tokyo champions show their true power.
9	"Showdown at Solomon"; Transliteration: "Kessen no Soromon" (Japanese: 決戦のソロモン)	December 3, 2014
The Try Fighters face G-Master for a spot at the national tournament. For Sekai, this is his chance to avenge Gyanko's defeat.
10	"Gunpla Collection"; Transliteration: "Gan Kore" (Japanese: ガン☆コレ)	December 10, 2014
The Try Fighters have won the West Tokyo Division finals and are taking a much-deserved break before the national tournament. Meanwhile, Mirai is selected to represent her talent agency in a Gunpla battle between fashion models. To prepare for this event, Yuuma helps her with her first Gunpla.
11	"Nielsen Labs"; Transliteration: "Nīrusen Rabo" (Japanese: ニールセン・ラボ)	December 17, 2014
To prepare for the national tournament, Mr. Ral brings the Try Fighters to a special training camp. But just as they prepare for a trial battle, someone from Yuuma's past returns to haunt him.
12	"To Fly to the Future"; Transliteration: "Mirai e Habataku Tame ni" (Japanese: 未来へ羽ばたくために)	December 24, 2014
Following the Try Fighters' humiliating defeat at the hands of Saga Adou and the intervention of Meijin Kawaguchi III, Sekai loses consciousness due to continuous assimilation with his Gunpla while Yuuma runs away. The Meijin challenges Yuuma to a Gunpla battle to reveal why Yuuma lost the fight, and Fumina encounters the person who inspired her to take up Gunpla battle.
13	"Beyond the Knuckle"; Transliteration: "Biyondo za Nakkuru" (Japanese: ビヨンド・ザ・ナックル)	January 7, 2015
After Sekai wakes up and proceeds to Nielsen Labs' workshop to repair his Build Burning Gundam, he encounters a mysterious girl who admires his Gunpla. He later on participates in a battle royal between members of other teams at the facility.
14	"Worthy Rivals"; Transliteration: "Kōtekishu-tachi" (Japanese: 好敵手たち)	January 14, 2015
Taking what they have learned from their stay at Nielsen Labs, the Try Fighters upgrade their Gunpla for the upcoming national tournament. Meanwhile, Minato enters the championship scene by joining a high school team and winning the Osaka qualifying finals.
15	"Reborn Try Fighters!"; Transliteration: "Shinsei! Torai Faitāzu" (Japanese: 新生！トライ・ファイターズ)	January 21, 2015
The national tournament begins, and the Try Fighters put their upgraded Gunpla to the test.
16	"Magnificent Shia"; Transliteration: "Kareinaru Shia" (Japanese: 華麗なるシア)	January 28, 2015
As the first round of the national tournament continues, Minato and Shia unleash their Gunpla.
17	"Haunted Castle Trap"; Transliteration: "Bōrei-jō no Wana" (Japanese: 亡霊城の罠)	February 4, 2015
The Try Fighters battle Team SD-R in the second round of the tournament. However, their battle takes place in a haunted castle, which gives Yuuma the creeps.
18	"Snibal-Drago-Gira"; Transliteration: "Sunaibaru Dorago Gira" (Japanese: スナイバル・ドラゴ・ギラ)	February 11, 2015
With Team SD-R revealing the true form of their Gunpla, the Try Fighters must figure out how to defeat their opponents to advance to the next round.
19	"Fateful Reunion"; Transliteration: "Unmei no Saikai" (Japanese: 運命の再会)	February 18, 2015
Yuuma receives the Try Burning Gundam's spare parts from China, but is cornered by a pack of muggers on his way back to his team's hotel. Meanwhile, the Try Fighters are set to face Tenzan Academy's team, which has a member that uses the same martial art as Sekai.
20	"Unbreakable Heart"; Transliteration: "Orenai Kokoro" (Japanese: 折れない心)	February 25, 2015
The battle between Sekai and Junya rages on, as both combatants unleash the full potential of their Gunpla.
21	"Blue Wings"; Transliteration: "Aoki Tsubasa" (Japanese: 蒼き翼)	March 4, 2015
In the semifinals, Celestial Sphere face Von Braun. However, something is amiss when Wilfrid notices Lucas Nemesis fighting alone.
22	"Follow Your Heart"; Transliteration: "Kokoro no Mama ni" (Japanese: 心のままに)	March 11, 2015
The Try Fighters face the Build Busters, with Yuuma and Minato finally settling their score.
23	"Build Fighter"; Transliteration: "Birudo Faitā" (Japanese: ビルド・ファイター)	March 18, 2015
As the Try Fighters and Celestial Sphere have two days to prepare for the final round, Yuuma locks himself in his hotel room with all three of his team's Gunpla to come up with a solution to counter his opponents' strategy.
24	"Final Burst"; Transliteration: "Fainaru Bāsuto" (Japanese: ファイナル・バースト)	March 25, 2015
The final round has begun, and only one team will walk out of it with trophy in hand.
25	"Our Gunpla"; Transliteration: "Bokutachi no Ganpura" (Japanese: 僕たちのガンプラ)	April 1, 2015
Following the aftermath of the national championships, Yuuma and Minato continue their rivalry in the Gunpla Builder's Contest Meijin Cup. Upon a heated argument on the outcome of the contest, both men settle their differences in a Gunpla Battle, which suddenly becomes a free-for-all with everyone in attendance involved.
SP	"Gundam Build Fighters Try Island Wars"; Transliteration: "Gandamu Birudo Faitāzu Torai Airando Wōzu" (Japanese: ガンダムビルドファイターズトライ アイランド・ウォーズ)	August 21, 2016
One year after winning the Gunpla Battle National Championships, Team Try Fighters is invited by Yajima Trading to a remote island to test the company's new battle system. Sekai and Fumina arrive on the island, only to discover that Gyanko, Shia, and Minato were also invited. Yuuma declines the offer as he is assisting Mirai on a photoshoot, only to discover that he and his teammates are on the same island. While training by the beach, Sekai meets a purple-haired girl. Meanwhile, the Nielsen Lab experiences an anomaly with their new Plavsky particles forms a giant crystal and cause Gunpla on the island to go out of control. The Gunpla Fighters must band together to stop the crystal from wreaking havoc on all Gunpla Battle Systems all over the world.

=== Gundam Build Fighters Battlogue ===
No.	Title	Original release date
1	"AI Battlogue"; Transliteration: "AI Batorōgu" (Japanese: AIバトローグ)	August 4, 2017
Allan Adams upgrades the Gunpla Battle System with a new AI that can replicate pilots from past Gundam series. To test the new system, he has his Reversible Gundam piloted by an AI replica of Ribbons Almark, while Meijin Kawaguchi III brings out his Ballistic Zaku, piloted by an AI replica of Char Aznable.
2	"Smash the Enemy's Secret Factory!"; Transliteration: "Teki no Himitsu Kaihatsu Kōjō o Tatake!" (Japanese: 敵の秘密開発工場をたたけ!)	September 8, 2017
To inaugurate the new G-Quest attraction at The Gundam Base Tokyo, Yuuma and Minato team up in a 10 minute mission to break through a Zeon base and destroy a prototype mobile suit.
3	"The Adventures of Fumina and Gyanko"; Transliteration: "Fumina to Gyanko no Daibōken" (Japanese: ふみなとギャン子の大冒険)	October 6, 2017
On their quest to defeat the Evil Mold Miyaga, Super Fumina and Hyper Gyanko stop by the Bearbear Village and discover that the Beargguy inhabitants had been abducted by UFOs. To bring happiness back to Chinagguy and the Petit'gguy population, Super Fumina and Hyper Gyanko must battle a giant Gunpla made out of discarded Acguy parts.
4	"Our War"; Transliteration: "Oretachi no Sensō" (Japanese: 俺たちの戦争)	November 3, 2017
The Renato Brothers are given a realistic Gunpla battle, but their opponent is not what they expected.
5	"Gunpla is the Greatest!"; Transliteration: "Ganpura wa Saikō da!" (Japanese: ガンプラは最高だ！)	December 8, 2017
As Meijin Kawaguchi the 3rd prepares for a European tour, he drops by Iori Hobby Shop for a rematch with Sei.
