= Miku Itō =

Japanese voice actress and singer

- 伊藤 美来
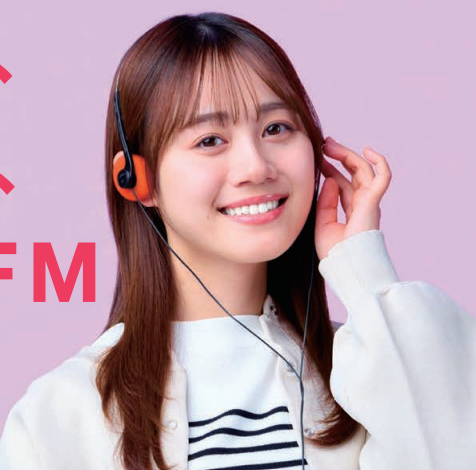
- Born: October 12, 1996 (age 30); Tokyo, Japan
- Occupations: Voice actress; singer
- Years active: 2013–present
- Agent: Voice Kit
- Notable work: Locodol as Nanako Usami; Action Heroine Cheer Fruits as Ann Akagi; Princess Connect! Re:Dive as Kokkoro; The Quintessential Quintuplets as Miku Nakano; BanG Dream! as Kokoro Tsurumaki; Adachi and Shimamura as Hougetsu Shimamura; The Aquatope on White Sand as Kukuru Misakino; Kamen Rider Revice as Lovekov; Spy Classroom as Grete
- Musical career
- Genres: J-Pop; Anison
- Instrument: Vocals
- Label: Nippon Columbia
- Website: columbia.jp/itomiku/

Miku Itō (伊藤 美来, Itō Miku; born October 12, 1996) is a Japanese voice actress and singer affiliated with Voice Kit. Her major voice roles include Nanako Usami in Locodol, Ann Akagi in Action Heroine Cheer Fruits, Kokoro Tsurumaki in BanG Dream!, Miku Nakano in The Quintessential Quintuplets, and Hougetsu Shimamura in Adachi and Shimamura.

She joined StylipS on April 28, 2013, along with Style Cube Kenshuusei client Moe Toyota. She is also a member of Pyxis with Toyota. Itō's hobbies and preferences are related to Super Sentai and Kamen Rider.

== Biography ==
Miku Ito was born on October 12, 1996 in Tokyo, Japan. From a young age, she loved watching plays, including stage plays and TV dramas. While watching TV dramas, she would try to make the same facial expressions as the actresses, imagining what emotions they were feeling and laughing or crying.

While in junior high and high school, Itō had a friend who was a big fan of anime and was very knowledgeable about it, leading her to learn about voice acting as a profession. When she researched it, she discovered that voice actors not only voice anime characters, but also appear in games, TV dramas and stage plays as actors, and are active as singers, and she was impressed by the versatility of the voice acting profession.

Itō later became a trainee at Style Cube and in 2012 she passed Style Cube's 1st Voice Actor Audition. In 2013, she made her voice acting debut as Yuriko Nanao in The Idolmaster Million Live!. In the same year, she joined the StylipS voice acting unit with Moe Toyota, a fellow trainee. Together with Toyota, she made the transition from trainee to permanent member.

In 2014, she debuted in a television anime as Nanako Usami in Locodol. In May 2015, Itō formed a new unit Pyxis with Moe Toyota.

In February 2016, she held her first one-man live performance, and in October 2016 she released her debut single "Awa to Berbane" from Nippon Columbia, making her solo debut as a singer.

Itō departed Style Cube in 2026 and joined Voice Kit.

== Personal life ==
Ito Miku enjoys watching anime, dancing, acting, and playing Hyakunin Isshu. Like her character, Yuriko Nanao, she also enjoys reading books, and due to her interest in Japanese language. She majored in Japanese linguistics at university.

She also practices kendo, but her level is still low. She is a fan of sentai hero series, especially Kamen Rider, where her favorite Rider is Den-O. She has two younger brothers.

== Filmography ==
=== Anime television series ===
2013

- Chronicles of the Going Home Club – Shieru Akabane
- Gargantia on the Verdurous Planet – Dancer
- Wanna Be the Strongest in the World – Yuho Mochizuki

2014

- Black Bullet – Mai
- Locodol – Nanako Usami
- The Comic Artist and His Assistants – Suino Sahoto

2015

- Ani Tore! EX – Asami Hoshi
- Million Doll – Mariko
- Re-Kan! – Narumi Inoue, Grandma Inoue
- Yurikuma Arashi – Katyusha Akae

2016

- Anitore! XX – Asami Hoshi
- Handa-kun – Maiko Mori
- Mahou Shoujo Nante Mouiidesukara – Mafuyu Shinogi, Girl C

2017

- Action Heroine Cheer Fruits – Ann Akagi
- Armed Girl's Machiavellism – Nono Mozunono
- Chain Chronicle ~Light of Haecceitas~ – Lilith

2018

- BanG Dream! Girls Band Party! Pico – Kokoro Tsurumaki
- Sword Art Online: Alicization – Frenika
- The Ryuo's Work Is Never Done! – Sasari Oga

2019

- BanG Dream! 2nd Season – Kokoro Tsurumaki
- How Clumsy you are, Miss Ueno – Yomogi Tanaka
- Hulaing Babies – Miku
- The Quintessential Quintuplets – Miku Nakano

2020

- Adachi and Shimamura – Hougetsu Shimamura
- Assault Lily Bouquet – Yuri Hitotsuyanagi, Friend
- BanG Dream! 3rd Season – Kokoro Tsurumaki
- BanG Dream! Girls Band Party! Pico: Ohmori – Kokoro Tsurumaki
- Gleipnir – Nana Mifune
- Hulaing Babies☆Petit – Miku
- Nekopara – Maple
- Princess Connect! Re:Dive – Kokkoro/Kokoro Natsume
- Sorcerous Stabber Orphen – Fiena

2021

- BanG Dream! Girls Band Party! Pico Fever! – Kokoro Tsurumaki
- Combatants Will Be Dispatched! – Russell of the Water
- How Not to Summon a Demon Lord Ω – Lumachina Weselia
- I've Been Killing Slimes for 300 Years and Maxed Out My Level – Fatla
- Muv-Luv Alternative – Chizuru Sakaki
- PuraOre! Pride of Orange – Yuka Iihara
- Suppose a Kid from the Last Dungeon Boonies Moved to a Starter Town – Phyllo
- Takt Op. Destiny – Titan
- The Aquatope on White Sand – Kukuru Misakino
- The Quintessential Quintuplets 2nd Season – Miku Nakano
- Yūki Yūna wa Yūsha de Aru Churutto! – Renge Miroku

2022

- Akebi's Sailor Uniform – Neko Kamimoku
- Love Flops – Aoi Izumisawa, Ai Izawa
- Princess Connect! Re:Dive Season 2 – Kokkoro/Kokoro Natsume

2023

- Kubo Won't Let Me Be Invisible – Akina Kubo
- Masamune-kun's Revenge R – Muriel Besson
- Spy Classroom – Grete
- Summoned to Another World for a Second Time – Alize
- Synduality: Noir – Maria
- The Eminence in Shadow 2nd Season – 559

2024

- Acro Trip – Chizuko Date
- Demon Lord 2099 – Machina
- Gods' Games We Play – Kerlich
- Jellyfish Can't Swim in the Night – Mahiru Kōzuki
- Narenare: Cheer for You! – Megumi Kaionji
- The Many Sides of Voice Actor Radio – Yasumi Utatane/Yumiko Satō

2025

- A Mangaka's Weirdly Wonderful Workplace – Mizuki Hazama
- Gachiakuta – Chiwa
- Ishura 2nd Season – Cuneigh the Wanderer
- The Water Magician – Nina

2026

- Even Though I'm a Super Timid Noble Girl, I Accepted the Bet from My Cunning Fiancé – Pia Rockwell
- I Want to End This Love Game – Miku Sakura
- Reincarnated as a Dragon Hatchling – Myria
- Roll Over and Die – Milkit
- Saved by the Ice Cold Prince's Embrace – Katrina
- The Frontier Lord Begins with Zero Subjects – Senai
- The Salty Koharu Has a Soft Spot for Me – Koharu Satō
- Tune In to the Midnight Heart – Shinobu Uzuki

2027

- 7-nin no Nemuri Hime – Clair
- Kagurabachi – Hinao
- Mistress Kanan Is Devilishly Easy – Hanako Ohanabatake

=== Theatrical animation ===
- The Idolmaster Movie: Beyond the Brilliant Future! (2014) – Yuriko Nanao
- Mazinger Z: Infinity (2018)
- BanG Dream! Film Live (2019) – Kokoro Tsurumaki
- BanG Dream! Film Live 2nd Stage (2021) – Kokoro Tsurumaki
- The Quintessential Quintuplets Movie (2022) – Miku Nakano
- Ganbatte Ikimasshoi (2024) – Hime Saeki

=== OVA ===
- Locodol (OVA 1, 2014; OVA 2, 2015; OVA 3, 2016) – Nanako Usami
- Fragtime (2019) – Misuzu Moritani

=== Live-Action Drama/Movies ===
- Kamen Rider Zero-One the Movie: Real×Time – Announcer Humagear
- Kamen Rider Revice – Lovekov

=== Video games ===
2013

- The Idolmaster Million Live! – Yuriko Nanao
- Girl Friend Beta – Kei Asami

2014

- Mikomori – Yukari Tsukino

2015

- Kaden Shojo – Kozue, Shizuku, Chino, Madoka (Game ceased their services on March 31, 2016)
- Quiz RPG: The World of Mystic Wiz – Tomi Kotobuki
- Xuccess Heaven – Suzu
- White Cat Project – Chocolat
- Shingun Destroy! – Yuriko Nanao
- Schoolgirl Strikers – Chika Wakatsuki
- Nekosaba – Kaito Niyaito, Blau
- Yome Collection – Narumi Inoue, Herself

2016

- Alternative Girls – Nono Asahina
- Shooting Girls – Kiriko Sakaki
- Friends of Leirya – Kaitō nyaito
- Riku ☆ Grandpa – 74 Tank Collection, 155mm Howitzer

2017

- Lala Maji: Honha Lara MAGIC – Minami Sakura
- BanG Dream! Girls Band Party! – Tsurumaki Kokoro
- Endride – X fragments - – Lieber
- The Idolmaster Million Live! Theater Days – Nanao Yuriko
- Unmanned War 2099 – Wang Ming Ling
- Mon Musume ☆ is Reimu – Amaterasu
- Yuki Yuna is a Hero: Hanayui no Kirameki – Renge Miroku

2018

- Princess Connect! Re:Dive – Kokkoro

2019

- Granblue Fantasy – Kolulu
- Gunvolt Chronicles: Luminous Avenger Ix – Isora
- Girls' Frontline – HS2000, Type 4
- Punishing: Gray Raven – Liv (Note: Miku replaced Kayano for this role since 2021, after the latter's voice lines was removed from Chinese, Japanese, and Taiwanese servers of Punishing: Gray Raven following her backlash as a result of her controversial Yasukuni Shrine visit that same year.)

2020

- Criminal Girls X – Usagi
- Dragalia Lost – Mitsuba
- Dragon Raja – Erii Uesugi

2021

- The Legend of Heroes: Trails Through Daybreak – Agnes Claudel
- A Certain Magical Index: Imaginary Fest – Fran Karasuma

2022

- Azur Lane – HMS Indomitable (92)
- The Diofield Chronicle – Lorraine Lucksaw
- The Legend of Heroes: Trails Through Daybreak II – Agnes Claudel
- Samurai Maiden – Iyo
- Path to Nowhere – Summer

2023

- 404 Game Re:set – The House of the Dead
- Honkai: Star Rail – Fu Xuan

2025

- Puella Magi Madoka Magica: Magia Exedra – Sumire Yoake

2026

- Wuthering Waves – Denia

=== Drama CD ===
2013

- Kono danshi, akunin to yoba remasu. – Akane
- Nami Eleanorima Drama CD Vol. 3 "Unrequited love" – Haruna Kosaka

2014

- PERFECT IDOL THE MOVIE – Nanao Yuriko
- Locodol – Usami Nanako

2015

- The Idolmaster Million Live! Series – Nanao Yuriko

== Discography ==
=== Album ===
Year	Title	Peak Oricon chart positions
2017	Suisai: Aquaveil	23
2019	PopSkip	12
2020	Rhythmic Flavor	39
2023	This One's for You	17
2026	39rpm	25
2026	Swirl	32

=== Singles ===
Year	Song	Peak Oricon chart positions	Album
2016	"Awa to Berbene"	20	Suisai: Aquaveil
2017	"Shocking Blue"	20	Suisai: Aquaveil
2018	"Mamoritai Mono no Tame ni"	26	PopSkip
2018	"Koi wa Movie"	21	PopSkip
2019	"Hirameki Heartbeat"	15	PopSkip
2020	"Plunderer"	19	Rhythmic Flavor
2020	"Kokou no Hikari Lonely dark"	7	Rhythmic Flavor
2021	"No.6"	17	This One's for You
2021	"Pasta"	19	This One's for You
2021	"High tide girl"	66	This One's for You
2022	"Ao Hyaku-shoku"	12	This One's for You
