= My Death Flags Show No Sign of Ending =

Japanese web novel series

- First light novel volume cover

俺の死亡フラグが留まるところを知らない (Ore no Shibō Furagu ga Todomaru Tokoro o Shiranai)
- Genre: Fantasy, isekai
- Novel series
- Written by: Izumi
- Published by: Shōsetsuka ni Narō
- Original run: November 9, 2014 – present
- Light novel
- Written by: Izumi
- Illustrated by: Achiki
- Published by: Takarajimasha
- Original run: August 6, 2015 – present
- Volumes: 4
- Manga
- Written by: Izumi
- Illustrated by: Mitsuya Otosu
- Published by: DeNA (digital); Takarajimasha (print)
- English publisher: NA: One Peace Books
- Imprint: Kono Manga ga Sugoi! Comics
- Magazine: Manga Box
- Original run: June 10, 2020 – present
- Volumes: 12 (digital); 8 (print)
- Anime television series
- Original run: 2027 – scheduled

My Death Flags Show No Sign of Ending (俺の死亡フラグが留まるところを知らない, Ore no Shibō Furagu ga Todomaru Tokoro o Shiranai) is a Japanese web novel series written by Izumi. It originally began serialization on the online publication platform Shōsetsuka ni Narō in November 2014. Takarajimasha later began publishing it as a light novel series with illustrations by Achiki in August 2015; four volumes have been released as of March 2017. A manga adaptation illustrated by Mitsuya Otosu began serialization on DeNA's Manga Box web service in June 2020. An anime television series adaptation is set to premiere in 2027.

== Plot ==
Kazuki Hirasawa, a university student, is reincarnated into another world, now finding himself as Harold Stokes, the protagonist of a video game he used to play. Knowing that in the original game, Stokes is a villainous character who is the subject of numerous death flags, he tried to change his fate and avoid doom. However, he realizes that defeating his innate arrogant personality with his kind-hearted nature from the real world is easier said than done.

== Characters ==
Harold Stokes (ハロルド・ストークス, Harurodo Sutōkusu)
An antagonist of an RPG game, in the original game he has a cruel personality and is destined to be defeated. In his previous life he was Kazuki Hirasawa (平沢 一希, Hirasawa Kazuki), a kind-hearted university student. Due to his past life, Harold wants to change his future. However, in this world, he has an innate arrogant personality that cannot easily be dealt with. Although he trains to become stronger and avoid his fated defeat, his actions only cause more suspicion by people around him.

== Media ==
=== Light novel ===
Izumi originally began posting the series as a web novel on the online publication platform Shōsetsuka ni Narō on November 9, 2014. They originally wrote a prototype version of the series during their university studies, with a setting set in the real world rather than a fantasy setting. However, they decided to rewrite the plot to take place in a fantasy world to better fit Shōsetsuka ni Narō's reader demographics and association with the isekai genre. It was later nominated for the third edition of the Net Novel Award (then known as Narou Con), ultimately receiving the grand prize in 2015. It was later picked up for publication by Takarajimasha, which began publishing it as a light novel featuring illustrations by Achiki. The first volume was released on August 6, 2015; four volumes have been released as of March 4, 2017.

No.	Release date	ISBN
1	August 6, 2015	978-4-8002-4474-1
2	January 23, 2016	978-4-8002-4958-6
3	June 25, 2016	978-4-8002-5580-8
4	March 4, 2017	978-4-8002-6767-2

=== Manga ===
A manga adaptation illustrated by Mitsuya Otosu began serialization on DeNA's Manga Box web service on June 10, 2020. The first digital volume was released by Manga Box on October 23, 2020, while the first tankōbon volume was released by Takarajimasha under the Kono Manga ga Sugoi! Comics label on January 15, 2021. Twelve digital volumes have been released as of March 31, 2026, while eight tankōbon volumes have been released as of January 23, 2026. The manga is licensed in English by One Peace Books.

No.	Original release date	Original ISBN	English release date	English ISBN
1	October 23, 2020 (ebook); January 15, 2021 (print)	978-4-299-01246-3	June 17, 2025	978-1-64273-435-5
2	January 25, 2021 (ebook); February 13, 2021 (print)	978-4-299-01398-9	December 9, 2025	978-1-64273-494-2
3	May 25, 2021 (ebook); November 12, 2021 (print)	978-4-299-02267-7	March 10, 2026	978-1-64273-545-1
4	September 24, 2021 (ebook); June 14, 2022 (print)	978-4-299-03056-6	—	—
5	February 25, 2022 (ebook); December 15, 2022 (print)	978-4-299-03762-6	—	—
6	November 25, 2022 (ebook); June 27, 2024 (print)	978-4-299-05613-9	—	—
7	May 26, 2023 (ebook); April 25, 2025 (print)	978-4-299-06716-6	—	—
8	November 30, 2023 (ebook); January 23, 2026 (print)	978-4-299-07534-5	—	—
9	April 30, 2024 (ebook)	—	—	—
10	November 30, 2024 (ebook)	—	—	—
11	August 31, 2025 (ebook)	—	—	—
12	March 31, 2026 (ebook)	—	—	—

=== Anime ===
An anime television series adaptation was announced on November 10, 2026. It is set to premiere in 2027.

== See also ==
- The Salty Koharu Has a Soft Spot for Me, another light novel series by the same illustrator
