= Pyxis (idol unit) =

Japanese musical group

- Origin: Japan
- Genres: J-Pop, Anison
- Years active: 2015-present
- Labels: Rockin' Music
- Members: Miku Itō; Moe Toyota
- Website: pyxis.party

Pyxis（Japanese: ピクシス）is a Japanese idol unit consisting of voice actresses Miku Itō and Moe Toyota.

== Biography ==
The unit was formed in May 2015, and they performed their first live concert in February 2016 titled "Pyxis Party 2016 〜Happy Valentine's Day〜".

After that, they continued their activities as an indie unit, working in magazines and radio shows. In May 2016, in the units' first anniversary concert, they announced a major label debut under Teichiku Records' new label "Rockin' Music".

== Discography ==
=== Single ===
Release date	Title	Catalog no.		Peak Oricon chart positions
Release date	Title	Limited edition	Regular edition	Peak Oricon chart positions
February 22, 2017	FLAWLESS	TECI-544	TECI-545	45
September 13, 2017	Daisuki x Janai (ダイスキ×じゃない)	TECI-582（Type A） TECI-583（Type B）	TECI-584	26
May 23, 2018	LONELY ALICE	TECI-617（Type A） TECI-618（Type B）	TECI-619	31

=== Albums ===
Release date	Title	Catalog no.		Peak Oricon chart positions
Release date	Title	Limited edition	Regular edition	Peak Oricon chart positions
August 24, 2016	First Love Warning (First Love 注意報！)	TECI-1511	TECI-1512	26
December 20, 2017	Pop-up Dream	TECI-1574	TECI-1575	75
January 20, 2021	Pyxis best	TECI-1719	TECI-1720	112

=== Tie-ups ===
Title	Tie-ups	Year
Tokimeki Sensation！	Ending theme for the Animemashite TV show in April 2016	2016
FLAWLESS	Ending theme for Duel Masters VSRF TV anime	2017
Daisuki x Janai	Image song for the light novel Kenshi o Mezashite Nyūgaku Shitanoni Mahō Tekisei 9999 Nandesukedo!?	2017
LONELY ALICE	Ending theme for Alice or Alice TV anime	2018

== See also ==
- StylipS
