= The Comic Artist and His Assistants =

Japanese manga and anime series

- Cover of the first manga volume

マンガ家さんとアシスタントさんと (Mangaka-san to Ashisutanto-san to)
- Genre: Comedy, slice of life
- Manga
- Written by: Hiroyuki
- Published by: Square Enix
- Magazine: Young Gangan; Shōnen Gangan; Gangan Online
- Original run: February 1, 2008 – September 21, 2012
- Volumes: 10
- Audio drama
- Released: January 26, 2011
- Episodes: 1
- Manga

The Comic Artist and His Assistants 2
- Written by: Hiroyuki
- Published by: Square Enix
- Magazine: Young Gangan
- Original run: August 2, 2013 – June 6, 2014
- Volumes: 1
- Anime television series
- Directed by: Takeshi Furuta
- Produced by: Jun Fukuda; Hiroyuki Tajima; Yukie Iwashita; Shintarō Yoshitake; Takayoshi Takeuchi; Daisuke Tatsumi; Sayaka Suzuki; Takuya Narita
- Written by: Aki Itami
- Music by: Tomoki Kikuya
- Studio: Zexcs
- Licensed by: NA: Sentai Filmworks; UK: Animatsu Entertainment
- Original network: Tokyo MX, AT-X
- Original run: April 7, 2014 – June 23, 2014
- Episodes: 12
- Original video animation
- Directed by: Takeshi Furuta
- Produced by: Jun Fukuda; Hiroyuki Tajima; Yukie Iwashita; Shintarō Yoshitake; Takayoshi Takeuchi; Daisuke Tatsumi; Sayaka Suzuki; Takuya Narita
- Written by: Aki Itami
- Music by: Tomoki Kikuya
- Studio: Zexcs
- Licensed by: NA: Sentai Filmworks; UK: Animatsu Entertainment
- Released: June 25, 2014 – November 26, 2014
- Runtime: 6-10 minutes (per episode)
- Episodes: 6

The Comic Artist and His Assistants (Japanese: マンガ家さんとアシスタントさんと, Hepburn: Mangaka-san to Ashisutanto-san to) is a Japanese four-panel manga series written and illustrated by Hiroyuki. It was serialized in Square Enix's seinen manga magazine Young Gangan from February 1, 2008, to September 21, 2012, and the chapters collected into 10 tankōbon volumes. A sequel titled The Comic Artist and His Assistants 2 was serialized from August 2, 2013, to June 6, 2014. An anime television series adaptation animated by Zexcs aired between April 7, 2014, and June 23, 2014.

== Plot ==
Manga author Yūki Aito is an incredibly perverted man whose main loves and desires is to love everyone close to him and draw ladies' underwear. His assistant, Ashisu, is constantly put into awkward situations and is forced to cope with Aito's shenanigans.

== Characters ==
=== Main characters ===
Yūki Aito (愛徒 勇気, Aito Yūki)
Voiced by: Yoshitsugu Matsuoka (anime), Jun Fukuyama (drama CD)
Yūki is the manga artist of the currently serialized "Hajiratte Cafe Latte" (HajiCafe). He is mostly viewed as perverted by many and does not hesitate to tell his interest or asking his assistants to be his model for reference. Yūki has an uncontrollable fetish for women's undergarments, specifically panties, even so that his main philosophy and theme of his manga revolves around panties, much to the chagrin of others. Yūki has the habit of doing his manga work at the last minute before fixed deadlines due to engaging in his interests, much to his editor's distress. Yūki's goal in life is to be confessed to by a girl before he dies. Yūki is said to be a very skilled manga artist, who could rank much better if he truly wanted, but his interest in drawing panties as his priority gives him only a decent ranking at best. He is 22 years old and happens to be a major masochist.
Sahoto Ashisu (足須 沙穂都, Ashisu Sahoto)
Voiced by: Saori Hayami (anime), Mamiko Noto (drama CD)
Sahoto is Yūki's 19-year-old assistant. Sahoto is described as serious on her work ethic yet very down-to-earth. She is often the target of Yūki's mischief, much to her chagrin, and doesn't hesitate to lash out at him. Albeit as a manga artist assistant, Sahoto also aims to serialize a manga series of her own; however, her attempts in doing so were constantly rejected by editors. Although she is more often than not annoyed by Yūki's antics, she deeply respects him as a manga artist.
Mihari Otosuna (音砂 みはり, Otosuna Mihari)
Voiced by: Arisa Noto (anime), Haruka Tomatsu (drama CD)
Mihari is Yūki's editor. Mihari is usually violent around Yūki, often scolding and beating him for his shortcomings. She is conscious of her small breast size and thus has a breast complex. She and Yūki were once classmates and is noted to have a liking for the latter at the time. Despite constantly berating Yūki for his irresponsible or otherwise perverted behavior, she's been shown to be quite tolerant on his deadlines, and she constantly encourages him to do better, knowing he is more than capable of doing so. She denies it, but it is hinted that she has not completely gotten over the enormous crush on Yūki she has had forever from high school, to which Yūki sometimes teases her for it.
Rinna Fuwa (風羽 りんな, Fuwa Rinna)
Voiced by: Yuka Iguchi (anime), Aki Toyosaki (drama CD)
Rinna is one of Yūki's assistants. Despite being an assistant, Rinna knows nothing about drawing manga, as she was hired by Mihari due to Yūki wanting someone who is cute. Rinna greatly admires Yūki and his work, being one of his fans. She is easy going and is generally cheerful, playing along with Yūki's weird perverted ideas. Rinna is 18 years old.
Sena Kuroi (黒井 せな, Kuroi Sena)
Voiced by: Rie Kugimiya (anime, drama CD)
Sena is a recurring assistant of Yūki. Sena is known by the manga industry as a hardworking and reliable assistant. Due to her small, childish stature, Sena is usually mistaken as a child and, at times, acts like one, especially when she is drunk. At first, she is shown to have weak strength, being unable to even open an ink pot, causing her to leave many manga artists out of pure embarrassment, which was rumored to be because the manga artists had offended her. She later develops feelings for Yūki. Sena is 19 years old and happens to be a major sadist.
Branya (ブラニャー, Buranyā)
Branya is Yūki's pet cat and mascot character. It can draw very well, and has been the subject of jealousy from Sahoto, who notes that it can draw better than her despite being a cat.

=== Monthly Shōnen Gongon manga artist team ===
Kazuma Tsuranuki (貫 一真, Tsuranuki Kazuma)
Voiced by: Eiji Miyashita (drama CD)
Kazuma is the manga artist of the currently serialized "Hot Blooded (Fire) Fighter". His manga's popularity is 14th out of 20 works in Gongon Comics.
Meisei Tomito (兎美都 冥聖, Tomito Meisei)
Voiced by: Hikaru Midorikawa (drama CD)
Meisei is the manga artist of Gongon Comics' second most popular manga "J.O.D (Judgement of Darkness)". He has a habit of looking down on others.
Ichika Konno (今野 一華, Konno Ichika)
Ichika is the manga artist of Gongon Comics' most popular manga "Adventure World". She is almost 30 years old but has never been in love before because she has spent most of her time on manga.
Tamako Motoki (元木 たまこ, Motoki Tamako)
Tamako is the manga artist of Gongon Comics' new manga "Tension 1000%". She speaks like a cat and is a very energetic girl.

=== Monthly Shōnen Gongon editing department ===
Matome Minano (皆野 まとめ, Minano Matome)
Voiced by: Manami Tanaka (anime)
Matome is the chief editor of Monthly Shōnen Gongon. Despite her position, people sometimes get confused about her identity due to her young age and small stature.
Kouken Tomito (富都 剛健, Tomito Kōken)
Voiced by: Hiroki Yasumoto (anime)
Kouken is the assistant chief editor of Monthly Shōnen Gongon. He is Meisei's older brother and his editor.
Aoi Tanemochi (種持 葵, Tanemochi Aoi)
Aoi is a new editor of Monthly Shōnen Gongon. He looks like a girl.

=== Others ===
Sahono Ashisu (足須 沙穂乃, Ashisu Sahono)
Voiced by: Miku Itō (anime)
Sahono is Sahoto's 13-year-old little sister.
Manabi Namida (波田 まなび, Namida Manabi)
Manabi is Yūki's 14-year-old student. She is a middle school student who wants to become a manga artist.
Sasae Enoshita (榎下 紗々絵, Enoshita Sasae)
Sasae is Ichika Konno's chief assistant and manager.
Mamori Sumino (住野 まもり, Sumino Mamori)
Mamori is Yūki's apartment manager.
Mirei Sumino (住野 美麗, Sumino Mirei)
Mirei is Mamori's older sister.
Rinna's father (りんなの父, Rinna no Chichi)
Rinna's father visits Yūki and tries to make Rinna to quit as Yūki's assistant.
Jun Kiyosaki (清崎純, Kiyosaki Jun)
Jun is Ashisu's first assistant after Ashisu successfully becomes a manga artist. She is introduced in the manga The Comic Artist and His Assistants 2.
Panchū (パンチュー)
A mascot character created by Yūki.

== Media ==
=== Manga ===
The Comic Artist and His Assistants was serialized in Square Enix's seinen manga magazine Young Gangan from February 1, 2008, to September 21, 2012. It was compiled in 10 volumes released between October 27, 2008, and December 25, 2012. A sequel titled The Comic Artist and His Assistants 2 was serialized from August 2013 to September 2014. It was compiled in 1 volume on June 25, 2014.

=== Drama CD ===
A drama CD of The Comic Artist and His Assistants has been released on January 26, 2011.

=== Anime ===
An anime television series adaptation animated by Zexcs aired from April 7 to June 23, 2014. Crunchyroll hosted a simultaneously released English subtitled version. Shortly after, Sentai Filmworks licensed the series for digital and physical release in North America. The series was released in Japan on 6 Blu-ray and DVD discs at a rate of one per month from June to November 2014.The series upcomingly was released in Mexico after Yowu Entertainment fired the show and being released by Televisa airing on three channels bitMe, the gaming channel, Golden Premier, The premium movie channel and Telehit, the music channel, and web airings on Blim The Mexican VOD subscription free-on-demand service as well as Canal 11 in Costa Rica, ETC in Chile, America TV in Peru, La Tele in Paraguay and Canal Uno in Colombia. Mini OVAs were included with each volume of the Blu-ray/DVD packages. Sentai released the series on subtitled-only Blu-ray and DVD on September 15, 2015. The opening song titled "Pure Impurities" (純粋なフジュンブツ, "Junsuina fujunbutsu") and ending song titled "Spica" are both sung by idol group StylipS. The Show was dubbed in French and aired on two channels Gong and Nolife, and the show until Nolife ceased operations Game One continued to air the show as well.

==== Episode list ====
No.	Title	Original release date
1	"Master the Boobs!"; Transliteration: "Oppai o kiwamero!" (Japanese: おっぱいを究めろ！)	April 7, 2014
1	"The Dream job" Transliteration: "Yumemiru oshigoto" (Japanese: 夢見るお仕事)	April 7, 2014
1	"Panty wars" Transliteration: "Pantsu wōzu" (Japanese: パンツウォーズ)	April 7, 2014
1	"Mihari Otosuna's Day Off"; Transliteration: "Otosuna mihari no kyūjitsu" (Japanese: 音砂みはりの休日)	April 7, 2014
2	"The New Assistant"; Transliteration: "Shin ashisutanto tōjō" (Japanese: 新アシスタント登場)	April 14, 2014
2	"That's Most Important"; Transliteration: "Sore ga daiji" (Japanese: それが大事)	April 14, 2014
2	"Together for the First Time"; Transliteration: "Hajimete no futari" (Japanese: はじめての二人)	April 14, 2014
3	"Smutty Magazine Panic"; Transliteration: "Etchi-bon panikku" (Japanese: エッチ本パニック)	April 21, 2014
3	"Can I Nurse Her to Health?"; Transliteration: "Kanbyō dekiru ka na" (Japanese: 看病できるかな)	April 21, 2014
3	"The Black Comet"; Transliteration: "Kuroi suisei arawaru" (Japanese: 黒い彗星現る)	April 21, 2014
4	"S & M"; Transliteration: "S to M" (Japanese: SとM)	April 28, 2014
4	"The Mascot Character"; Transliteration: "Mascot Kyara" (Japanese: マスコットキャラ)	April 28, 2014
4	"Introducing Bra-Mew"; Transliteration: "Buranyā Tōjō" (Japanese: ブラニャー登場)	April 28, 2014
4	"Seventeen Mihari"; Transliteration: "Sebuntīn Mihari" (Japanese: セブンティーンみはり)	April 28, 2014
5	"Shock in the Park"; Transliteration: "Kōen Shokku" (Japanese: 公園ショック)	May 5, 2014
5	"Someday"; Transliteration: "Itsuka wa" (Japanese: いつかは)	May 5, 2014
5	"Using Those Around You for Inspiration"; Transliteration: "Midjikana Hito o Sankō ni" (Japanese: 身近な人を参考に)	May 5, 2014
6	"Let's Go to a Hot Spring"; Transliteration: "Onsen ni Ikou" (Japanese: 温泉に行こう)	May 12, 2014
7	"The Attack of the Little Sister"; Transliteration: "Imouto Shuurai" (Japanese: 妹襲来)	May 19, 2014
7	"Their Night Together"; Transliteration: "Futari no Yoru" (Japanese: 二人の夜)	May 19, 2014
7	"A Piggyback for the Super-Assistant"; Transliteration: "Super Assistant o Onbu" (Japanese: スーパーアシスタントをおんぶ)	May 19, 2014
8	"Looked Over by the Editor-in-Chief"; Transliteration: "Henshū-chō chekku" (Japanese: 編集長チェック)	May 26, 2014
8	"To Feel Like a Girl"; Transliteration: "On'nanoko no kimochi ni" (Japanese: 女の子の気持ちに)	May 26, 2014
8	"Overdoing It"; Transliteration: "Yari-sugi" (Japanese: やりすぎ)	May 26, 2014
9	"Past Mistakes"; Transliteration: "Kako no Ayamachi" (Japanese: 過去の過ち)	June 2, 2014
10	"Sena's Close Call"; Transliteration: "Sena-chan Kikiippatsu" (Japanese: せなちゃん危機一髪)	June 9, 2014
10	"I'll Cheer You on!" Transliteration: "Ōen shimasu!" (Japanese: 応援します!)	June 9, 2014
10	"Rain Talk"; Transliteration: "Ame Tōku" (Japanese: 雨トーク)	June 9, 2014
11	"The Feared Transformation"; Transliteration: "Osoreteita Henka" (Japanese: 恐れていた変化)	June 16, 2014
11	"You Can Do It, Sena"; Transliteration: "Ganbare Sena-chan" (Japanese: がんばれせなちゃん)	June 16, 2014
11	"Know Thyself"; Transliteration: "Jibun o Shirou" (Japanese: 自分を知ろう)	June 16, 2014
12	"Progress"; Transliteration: "Zenshin" (Japanese: 前進)	June 23, 2014
12	"The End of Summer"; Transliteration: "Natsunoowari" (Japanese: 夏の終わり)	June 23, 2014
12	"Psychological Profiling Using Underwear"; Transliteration: "Pantsu de Wakaru Seikaku Shindan" (Japanese: パンツで分かる性格診断)	June 23, 2014
OVA–1	"Ashisu's Holiday"; Transliteration: "Ashisu-san no Kyūjitsu" (Japanese: 足須さんの休日)	June 25, 2014
OVA–1	"You Never Know Until You Try"; Transliteration: "Yatte Minakucha Wakaranai" (Japanese: やってみなくちゃわからない)	June 25, 2014
OVA–2	"The Dreaming Comic Artist"; Transliteration: "Mangakka-san no yume" (Japanese: 漫画家さんの夢)	July 23, 2014
OVA–3	"Study Date"; Transliteration: "Date de Obenkyou" (Japanese: デートでお勉強)	August 27, 2014
OVA–4	"Protect the cute" Transliteration: "Kawaii o Mamorou" (Japanese: かわいいを守ろう)	September 24, 2014
OVA–5	"Little Sister VS Editor-in-Chief"; Transliteration: "Imōto VS Henshū-chō" (Japanese: 妹VS編集長)	October 29, 2014
OVA–6	"The Perfect Day for a Nap"; Transliteration: "O Hirune Biyori" (Japanese: お昼寝日和)	November 26, 2014
OVA–6	"When Assistants Snap"; Transliteration: "Kireta Ashisutanto" (Japanese: キレたアシスタント)	November 26, 2014
