= Locodol =

Japanese manga series

- Cover of first manga volume published by Ichijinsha featuring Nanako Usami (left) and Yukari Kohinata (right)

普通の女子校生が【ろこどる】やってみた (Futsū no Joshikōsei ga (Locodol) Yattemita)
- Genre: Comedy; Slice of life
- Manga
- Written by: Kōtarō Kosugi
- Published by: Ichijinsha
- Magazine: Manga 4-Koma Palette
- Original run: October 2011 – April 2022
- Volumes: 10
- Anime television series
- Directed by: Munenori Nawa
- Produced by: Tomoko Kawasaki; Takeshi Tanaka; Masatoshi Ishizuka; Kazuhiro Kanemitsu; Atsushi Iwasaki; Hitoshi Yagi; Kenji Yamaguchi; Yoshiko Nakayama; Katsuhiro Ikuma; Shigeaki Arima
- Written by: Yuniko Ayana
- Music by: Tomoki Hasegawa
- Studio: Feel
- Licensed by: NA: Sentai Filmworks
- Original network: TBS, Sun TV, CBC, TBS Channel 1, TBS Channel 2, BS-TBS, AT-X
- Original run: July 4, 2014 – September 18, 2014
- Episodes: 12 + 3 OVA

Locodol (ろこどる, Rokodoru), short for Futsū no Joshikōsei ga Locodol Yattemita (普通の女子校生が【ろこどる】やってみた。; "Ordinary High School Girls Tried Being Locodols"), is a Japanese four-panel manga series written and illustrated by Kōtarō Kosugi. The manga was serialized in Ichijinsha's Manga 4-Koma Palette magazine from October 2011 to February 2022. An anime television series adaptation animated by Feel aired between July and September 2014, with three original video animation episodes released between September 2014 and June 2016.

== Plot ==
In the town of Nagarekawa (流川市, Nagarekawa-shi; lit. 'Flowing River City'), Nanako Usami, an ordinary high school girl, is approached by her uncle to become a local idol or "Locodol", partnering with upperclassman Yukari Kohinata to form the idol unit, Nagarekawa Girls (流川ガールズ, Nagarekawa Gāruzu). As the girls use their talent to promote Nagarekawa and their businesses, they are joined by Yui Mikoze, who acts as the local mascot, and Mirai Nazukari, who serves as Yui's substitute.

== Characters ==
Nanako Usami (宇佐美 奈々子, Usami Nanako)
Voiced by: Miku Itō
Nanako is a first-year student at Nagarekawa High School who dreams of becoming a Locodol after being recruited by her uncle. She is generally the most level-headed member of the group, and worries about all sorts of things related to her job. Her nervousness on screen often results in her stuttering and mispronouncing her name as "Nanyako".
Yukari Kohinata (小日向 縁, Kohinata Yukari)
Voiced by: Sachika Misawa
Yukari is Nanako's blonde-haired partner of Nagarekawa Girls and a second-year student at Nagarekawa High. She is described as someone who "seems perfect, but ends up being airheaded". She comes from a wealthy family, and has lived by herself in an apartment since entering high school.^{Ep. 2} She ponders studying abroad after high school.^{Ep. 5} Her grandfather was the town's former mayor.^{Ep. 9} She is very fond of Nanako,^{Ep. 2} and was inspired by the latter's kindness to help others.^{Ep. 9}
Yui Mikoze (三ヶ月 ゆい, Mikoze Yui)
Voiced by: Maya Yoshioka
Yui is a third-year student at Nagarekawa High School who works alongside them as the mascot character, Uogokoro-kun (魚心くん). Her brown hair is styled in a short ponytail. She is particularly athletic, able to perform various acrobatic feats in her costume despite its weight.^{Ep. 3} She plans to use her savings from her locodol activity to enroll in a voice acting school.^{Ep. 5}
Mirai Nazukari (名都借 みらい, Nazukari Mirai)
Voiced by: Inori Minase
Mirai is a first-year student at Nanako and Yukari's school who is hired as a substitute Uogokoro-kun to reduce Yui's workload. She is a capable performer in the school's drama club, but generally shy otherwise.
Saori Nishifukai (西深井 沙織, Nishifukai Saori)
Voiced by: Asami Shimoda
Saori is the Nagarekawa Girls' manager who secretly uses pictures she takes at events for her own fansite.
Shōko Noda (野田 硝子, Noda Shōko)
Voiced by: Shiori Izawa
Shōko is Nanako's classmate with short burgundy-colored hair and low pigtail braids.
Satsuki Kashiwaba (柏葉 さつき, Kashiwaba Satsuki)
Voiced by: Mikako Izawa
Satsuki is Nanako's classmate with the blonde hair.
Misato Mizumoto (水元 美里, Mizumoto Misato)
Voiced by: Minami Tsuda
Misato is Nanako's classmate with a ponytail.
Sumire Mihara (美原 菫, Mihara Sumira)
Voiced by: Eriko Matsui
Sumire is Yukari's cousin and classmate.
Mitsugu Ōta (太田 貢, Ōta Mitsugu)
Voiced by: Takehiro Murozono
Nanako's uncle (mother's brother) who is on the city council. He is the one responsible for recruiting the Locodols and was their previous manager before Saori was hired.^{Ep. 1} He picks his niece to be a locodol because she is average in appearance and has a safe, non-scandalous character.^{Ep. 9} At the end of the anime television series, he reschedules the girls' appearance at their local city festival so that they can attend after the Locodol festival goes long.^{Ep. 12}
Tatsuya Usami (宇佐美 達也, Usami Tatsuya) and Tomoko Usami (宇佐美 智子, Usami Tomoko)
Tatsuya voiced by: Toshinobu Iida
Tomoko voiced by Mao Ichimichi
Nanako's parents. Tomoko has a part-time job as a cashier.^{Ep. 1}
Awa Awa Girls

Aoi Anan (阿南 葵, Anan Aoi) , Tsubasa Tsurugi (鶴木 つばさ, Tsurugi Tsubasa) , and Miyako Mima (美馬 都, Mima Miyako)

Voiced by: Asami Imai, Tomoyo Kurosawa, and Emi Nitta
The Awa Awa Girls (stylized as AWA^{2}GiRLS), are a locodol group from Tokunami City. Having won the Locodol Festival the previous year, the group has made many national TV appearances.^{Ep. 11} However, after meeting the Nagarekawa Girls, they realize the importance of representing their hometown.^{Ep. 12}

== Media ==
=== Manga ===
Futsū no Joshikōsei ga Locodol Yattemita is a four-panel comic strip written and illustrated by Kōtarō Kosugi. It originally appeared in Ichijinsha's Manga 4-Koma Palette magazine between the October and December 2011 issues, and then later began serialization with the April 2012 issue. The first tankōbon was published by Ichijinsha on January 22, 2013, and ten volumes have been published as of April 21, 2022. A special edition of the fifth volume was released bundled with a drama CD.

=== Anime ===
A 12-episode anime television series produced by Feel aired on TBS between July 4, 2014, and September 18, 2014 and was simulcast outside of Asia by Crunchyroll. An original video animation episode was included on the first Blu-ray Disc/DVD volume released on September 24, 2014, and was streamed on Crunchyroll from December 3, 2014.

The opening theme is "Mirai Fanfare" (ミライファンファーレ; Future Fanfare) by Nagarekawa Girls (Miku Itō and Sachika Misawa) and the ending theme is "Mirai Shōjo-tachi" (未来少女たち; Future Girls) by Miku Itō, Sachika Misawa, Maya Yoshioka, and Inori Minase. The theme songs were released on July 30, 2014, with an appearance by Itō at Nagareyama which the fictional town of Nagarekawa is based on. A character single with insert songs was released on August 27, 2014. Additional OVA episodes were released on December 24, 2015, and June 22, 2016.

==== Episode list ====
No.	Title (Note: English titles are taken from the Sentai Filmworks home media)	Screenplay	Animation Director	Original air date
1	"[Locodol] We Tried Starting It."; Transliteration: ""Rokodoru" Hajimetemita" (Japanese: 【ろこどる】はじめてみた。)	Takafumi Fujii	Yuniko Ayana	July 4, 2014
Nanako Usami, a normal high school girl living in Nagarekawa, is asked by her uncle, Mitsugu Ōta, to help promote the opening of a swimming pool. Seeing it as an opportunity to earn some money to get a new swimsuit, Nanako agrees, but soon discovers that she will become a Locodol (local idol). Although Nanako is embarrassed to perform, she meets Yukari Kohinata, a kind and attractive girl who becomes her new partner in the event.
2	"We Tried Going and Playing."; Transliteration: "Asobi ni Ittemita." (Japanese: 遊びに行ってみた。)	Mitsuko Oya	Yuniko Ayana	July 11, 2014
When Nanako and Yukari help review a restaurant, Nanako gets nervous about saying something that might ruin its reputation if the food disappoints. After more Locodol work, Yukari invites Nanako over to her place to discuss what they should call their unit, but goes a little overboard while preparing for her arrival.
3	"We Tried Putting It On, We Tried Taking It Off."; Transliteration: "Kitemita. Nuidemita." (Japanese: 着てみた。脱いでみた。)	Takafumi Fujii	Tatsuya Takahashi	July 18, 2014
The girls, whose unit is named Nagarekawa Girls, are joined by a mascot character, Uogokoro-kun, who is revealed to be Yui Mikoze. Nanako's classmates Noda and Satsuki come to their next gig. Oota gives Nanako and Yukari new uniforms. The rainy weather threatens to clear out the audience until Nanako comes up with an idea.
4	"We Tried Adding a Manager and Stuff."; Transliteration: "Manējā toka Tsuitemita." (Japanese: マネージャーとかついてみた。)	Yoshihiro Hiramine	Momoko Murakami	July 25, 2014
When the news reports of idols having their uniforms stolen by perverts and fans, Nanako becomes wary of the situation. The girls get a new manager, Saori Nishifukai, who seems to be quite reliable. Later, Yukari takes Nanako to an amusement park, where they end up performing a guerilla concert for the children.
5	"We Tried Setting a Big Goal."; Transliteration: "Biggu-na Mokuhyō Tatetemita." (Japanese: ビッグな目標立ててみた。)	Yoshitaka Koyama	Tatsuya Takahashi	August 1, 2014
As the girls think about their futures, Nanako sets her sights on a national debut for the group. The moment they set their goal, the girls learn that Uogokoro-kun will appear on a mascot athletics festival airing on national TV. Yui has a new lighter costume but it lacks the voice changers, so Nanako and Yukari are given more potential screen-time to act as Uogokoro-kun's interpreters. After Yui explains a bit about Uogokoro-kun's backstory, Yukari takes the girls to a tiny shrine to pray for good luck.
6	"We Tried Gathering Cute and Loose Characters."; Transliteration: "Yuru Kyara Atsumetemita." (Japanese: ゆるキャラ集めてみた。)	Satoshi Saga	Momoko Murakami	August 8, 2014
As the mascot athletics festival gets underway, Nanako and Yukari have to ad lib their segment promoting Nagarekawa. Uogokoro-kun advances to the finals, albeit largely due to her opponents self-destructing in various events. When Yui worries about not living up to everyone's expectations, Nanako, Yukari and Saori assure her that staying healthy and not pushing herself too hard is more important than winning.
7	"We Tried Adding a Lot of Things."; Transliteration: "Iroiro Fuetemita." (Japanese: いろいろ増えてみた。)	Mitsuko Ohya	Yuniko Anaya	August 15, 2014
The girls nervously await the broadcast of the mascot athletics festival. Due to their various circumstances, each girl ends up missing Nanako and Yukari's segment as it airs, so they make plans to watch it together the next day. With Uogokuro-kun's popularity increasing as a result of the program, Mirai Nazukari, one of Yui's friends from her drama club, is hired as a substitute Uogokuro-kun actor to lighten Yui's workload. Though Nanako is slightly downhearted due to Mirai being too shy around her outside of costume, she feels happy when a fan comes all the way from Tokyo to see the girls.
8	"We Tried Gathering the Courage to Call."; Transliteration: "Yūki o Dashite, Yondemita." (Japanese: 勇気をだして、呼んでみた。)	Yoshihiro Kawamine	Momoko Murakami	August 22, 2014
Nanako tries to become closer friends with Mirai by taking her to karaoke, only to find her refusing to sing alongside her. Later, as Mirai's responsibilities as Uogokuro-kun increases, she asks Nanako to help train her to become as good as Yui. During practice, Mirai injures her leg attempting to perform Yui's signature backflip, with Saori warning her not to do it again as kids may attempt to imitate it. On a day where Yui and Mirai are taking turns as Uogokuro-kun, Mirai receives some praise for protecting Yui's identity from a peeking child. Despite her injury, Mirai performs a performance with Yui's group. Nanako and Mirai also become closer friends without even realizing it.
9	"We Tried Being Selfish."; Transliteration: "Wagamama Ittemita." (Japanese: ワガママ言ってみた。)	Yoshihiro Kawamine	Yuniko Ayana	August 29, 2014
As the girls help out at a train station for the day, Nanako meets Yukari's grandfather, the town's former mayor. When Nanako wonders why Yukari decided to become a Locodol, Yukari comes down with a fever from pushing herself too hard and is ordered to rest. While Nanako takes care of her, Yukari recalls when she first encountered Nanako whilst working as a store mascot, helping a lost girl find her mother. Despite winding up getting fired from her job in the process, Yukari became inspired by Nanako's selflessness, becoming delighted when they could become partners as Nagarekawa Girls.
10	"We Tried Working As Four."; Transliteration: "4-nin no Chikara de Yattemita." (Japanese: 4人の力でやってみた。)	Takafumi Fujii	Tatsuya Takahashi	September 5, 2014
The girls are informed of a Locodol Festival, where Locodols from various regions will be participating, and asked to write a new song for the Nagarekawa Girls to perform. As Nanako struggles to come up with lyrics, Mirai suggests that she write about their experiences as Locodols. After Nanako's classmates suggest she think about incorporating her feelings, she spends the night with Yukari's place, coming up with some lyrics as they talk about their memories. After some adjustments from Mirai, Yukari writes the composition whilst Yui sorts out the choreography, allowing the group to get onto practising. With the song finalized, Nanako decides she would like to debut it for the people of Nagarekawa at their next local event.
11	"We Tried Gathering Locodols."; Transliteration: "Rokudoru Atsumetemita." (Japanese: ロコドル集めてみた。)	Mitsuko Ohya	Tatsuya Takahashi	September 12, 2014
The girls learn that the Locodol Festival takes place on the same day as the Nagarekawa Summer Festival and must somehow perform at both events. Arriving in Nagoya for the first day of the Locodol Festival – where they will sell local specialities – Yukari takes Nanako to look at the stage they will perform the next day, where they meet the previous winners, Awa Awa Girls. After the girls eventually bring attention to their booth with an on-stage presentation, the Awa Awa Girls feel downhearted that their own hometown's local specialities were ignored by customers in favor of their idol merchandise.
12	"We Tried Being Locodols."; Transliteration: "Rokodoru Yattemita." (Japanese: 【ろこどる】やってみた。)	Yoshihiro Hiramine	Yuniko Ayana	September 19, 2014
As the girls nervously await their performance at the Locodol Festival, they are visited by Nanako's classmates, who give them some encouragement. Noticing Nanako's worries, Yukari takes her somewhere quiet to calm her, reminding her not to think about trying to rank first and just focus on doing their best. When they return, they learn that due to the other groups trying to take over Awa Awa Girls and pushing their performance behind schedule, they probably have to miss the Nagarekawa Summer Festival. Confirming the pair's desire to perform at both events, Mitsugu offers to do what he can on his end to make it happen. Stepping on stage, the girls perform the song everyone worked together on, through which they express all the experiences they've been through since becoming Locodols. After being announced as the overall winners, the Awa Awa Girls – having heard of the Nagarekawa Girls' conundrum – encourage them to head off early so they can make their Summer Festival in time, understanding the importance of supporting their local events. The group soon returns to Nagarekawa, where Mitsugu had kept the festival going until their arrival, and eventually perform for the town they love.

==== OVA episode list ====
No.	Title	Screenplay	Animation Director	Original release date
OVA–1	"We Tried Giving a Tour of Nagarekawa."; Transliteration: "Nagarekawa, Annaishitemita." (Japanese: 流川、案内してみた。)	Satoshi Saga	Momoko Murakami	September 24, 2014
On their day off from Locodol work, Nanako and the others meet Awa Awa Girls, who ask to take them on a tour through Nagarekawa, only to become apparent that Nagarekawa does not have much in the way of tourist spots. The girls soon hit the local swimming pool, where they end up playing beach volleyball with some children. By the time they have to return home, Awa Awa Girls come to realize that even though there is not much to Nagarekawa, there are a lot of warmths that comes from its people.
OVA–2	"We All Celebrated Together."; Transliteration: "Minna de Oiwaishite Mimashita." (Japanese: みんなでお祝いしてみました。)	Unknown	Unknown	December 24, 2015
With Yukari's birthday falling on Christmas Day, Nanako hopes to make her birthday party a big success. After shopping for a present for Yukari, Nanako attends a Christmas party with her classmates, Misato, Satsuki, and Shouko, who give her a Santa outfit to surprise Yukari with. Although Nanako ends up forgetting to take her present, Yukari appreciates her coming over to celebrate her birthday anyway, with everyone else showing up the next morning to celebrate.
OVA–3	"We Tried Making a PV."; Transliteration: "PV Tsukuttemita." (Japanese: PV作ってみた。)	Unknown	Unknown	June 22, 2016
The girls learn they will be shooting a PV, only to discover it is PR video of Nagarekawa's tourist spots as opposed to a music video. Amidst the shooting, the girls are told they are too stiff and given a free time to come up with ideas to make the video more interesting. With Mirai nominated as director, the girls eventually shot a more natural flowing video that also gets Nagarekawa's citizens involved. They soon release the finished video, which ends up resembling a music video after all.

==== Home release ====
The series was released to DVD and Blu-ray format in seven volumes. The first volume contains a full-length OVA special and six illustrated cards. In North America, Sentai Filmworks released the 12-episode anime and an OVA as a boxset in Japanese with English subtitles.

(Japan, Region 2)
Volume	Episodes	DVD/Blu-ray release date
Volume 1	1, OVA	September 24, 2014
Volume 2	2, 3	October 29, 2014
Volume 3	4, 5	November 26, 2014
Volume 4	6, 7	December 24, 2014
Volume 5	8, 9	January 28, 2015
Volume 6	10, 11	February 25, 2015
Volume 7	12	March 25, 2015
