= The Salty Koharu Has a Soft Spot for Me =

Japanese light novel series

- First light novel volume cover, featuring Koharu Satō

塩対応の佐藤さんが俺にだけ甘い (Shiotaiō no Satō-san ga Ore ni Dake Amai)
- Genre: Romantic comedy
- Novel series

Shiotaiō no Satō-san, Kono Mae Nanpa kara Tasukete kara Nanka Ore ni dake Mechakucha Amakunai?
- Written by: Kazami Sawatari
- Published by: Shōsetsuka ni Narō
- Original run: June 19, 2019 – March 7, 2021
- Light novel
- Written by: Kazami Sawatari
- Illustrated by: Achiki
- Published by: Shogakukan
- Imprint: Gagaga Bunko
- Original run: December 18, 2019 – present
- Volumes: 13 + 1 short story
- Manga
- Written by: Kazami Sawatari
- Illustrated by: Kaya Tetsuyama
- Published by: Shogakukan
- English publisher: NA: Comikey
- Imprint: Ura Sunday Shōnen Comics
- Magazine: MangaONE; Ura Sunday
- Original run: May 15, 2020 – present
- Volumes: 11
- Anime television series

The Cold Sato-san Is Only Sweet to Me
- Directed by: Fumihiro Yoshimura
- Written by: Takashi Aoshima
- Music by: Shun Narita
- Studio: Tezuka Productions
- Licensed by: Crunchyroll: SEA: Plus Media Networks Asia
- Original network: AT-X, Tokyo MX, BS-TBS, Wowow, CBC, MBS
- Original run: October 6, 2026 – present
- Episodes: 1
- icon

The Salty Koharu Has a Soft Spot for Me (塩対応の佐藤さんが俺にだけ甘い, Shiotaiō no Satō-san ga Ore ni Dake Amai; lit. 'The Salt-God Satō-san Is Only Sweet To Me!') is a Japanese light novel series written by Kazami Sawatari and illustrated by Achiki. The series was serialized as a web novel posted on the website Shōsetsuka ni Narō from June 2019 to March 2021, before being picked up for publication by Shogakukan under their Gagaga Bunko imprint in December 2019. Thirteen volumes and a short story volume have been published as of October 2026. A manga adaptation illustrated by Kaya Tetsuyama began serialization on the MangaONE and Ura Sunday services in May 2020, and has been compiled into eleven tankōbon volumes as of October 2026. An anime television series adaptation produced by Tezuka Productions premiered in October 2026.

== Plot ==
The series follows Sōta Oshio, a second year high school student and a part-time worker at his family's cafe. One day, he saves his classmate Koharu Satō after other customers make advances on her. Sōta and Koharu, both having feelings for each other, form a relationship.

== Characters ==
Sōta Oshio (押尾 颯太, Oshio Sōta)
Voiced by: Arthur Lounsbery (audiobook, voice comic), Hiiro Ishibashi (anime)
Sōta is a second-year high school student who works part-time at his family's cafe. He posts pictures of the cafe on social media, where the cafe's account has over 5,000 followers. He has been in love with Koharu since middle school, but has never made his feelings for her known, fearing rejection. Koharu also has feelings for him as well, but he does not realize it. His mother died when he was young, and he was raised by his muscular father.
Koharu Satō (佐藤 こはる, Satō Koharu)
Voiced by: Nene Hieda (audiobook, voice comic), Miku Itō (anime)
A beautiful but cold highschool girl and Sōta's classmate and his first love. She is named "Salt-God Satō-san" and has a reputation for rejecting anyone in school. She befriends Sōta after seeing his social media pictures, which interest her as her own photography skills are poor. It is revealed that she has had feelings for him since the entrance exams.
Ren Misono (三園 蓮, Misono Ren)
Voiced by: Yūki Yonai (audiobook, voice comic), Chiaki Kobayashi (anime)
Ren is Sōta's best friend who is popular among women despite his rough personality. He often gives him advice of various qualities.
Rinka Sudō (須藤 凛香, Sudō Rinka)
Voiced by: Himari Mochida (audiobook, voice comic), Miyu Tomita (anime)
Rinka is Koharu's cousin in junior high school who cares about her very much. She is worried about Koharu and her relationship with Sōta due to Koharu previously lacking romantic relationships.
Shizuku Misono (三園 雫, Misono Shizuku)
Voiced by: Kanna Yanagida (audiobook, voice comic), Yoshino Aoyama (anime)
Mayo Nezu (根津 麻世, Nezu Mayo)
Voiced by: Yui Otagiri (audiobook, voice comic), Hisako Kanemoto (anime)
Seizaemon Oshio (押尾 清左衛門, Oshio Seizaemon)
Voiced by: Hayato Fujii (audiobook, voice comic), Yasunori Matsumoto (anime)
Madoka Murasaki (村崎 円花, Murasaki Madoka)
Voiced by: Rei Sonoda (audiobook), Yuki Wakai (anime)

== Media ==
=== Light novel ===
The light novel is written by Kazami Sawatari and illustrated by Achiki and was originally posted as a web novel on the website Shōsetsuka ni Narō on June 19, 2019, under the title Shiotaiō no Satō-san, Kono Mae Nanpa kara Tasukete kara Nanka Ore ni dake Mechakucha Amakunai? (塩対応の佐藤さん、この前ナンパから助けてからなんか俺にだけメチャクチャ甘くない？). Sawatari later removed the series from the website on March 7, 2021, due to a lack of time for working on it as well as it diverging from the published version. Shogakukan later picked up the series for publication under their Gagaga Bunko imprint beginning on December 18, 2019. Thirteen volumes and a short story volume have been published as of October 2026. An audiobook of the first volume has also been released.

No.	Japanese release date	Japanese ISBN
1	December 18, 2019	978-4-09-451823-8
2	April 17, 2020	978-4-09-451838-2
3	September 18, 2020	978-4-09-451865-8
4	February 18, 2021	978-4-09-451883-2
5	August 19, 2021	978-4-09-453019-3
6	March 18, 2022	978-4-09-453057-5
6.5	June 17, 2022	978-4-09-453071-1
7	April 18, 2023	978-4-09-453121-3
8	October 18, 2023	978-4-09-453152-7
9	May 20, 2024	978-4-09-453190-9
10	December 18, 2024	978-4-09-453222-7
11	August 20, 2025	978-4-09-453255-5
12	March 18, 2026	978-4-09-453280-7
13	October 16, 2026	978-4-09-453313-2

=== Manga ===
A manga adaptation illustrated by Kaya Tetsuyama began serialization on the MangaONE and Ura Sunday services on May 15, 2020. It has been compiled into eleven tankōbon volumes as of October 2026. A voiced comic video featuring the same cast as the audiobook was posted on YouTube on August 16, 2021.

The manga's chapters are published in English by Comikey.

No.	Japanese release date	Japanese ISBN
1	September 18, 2020	978-4-09-850249-3
2	February 19, 2021	978-4-09-850458-9
3	August 18, 2021	978-4-09-850673-6
4	March 18, 2022	978-4-09-851032-0
5	October 12, 2022	978-4-09-851334-5
6	April 18, 2023	978-4-09-852013-8
7	October 12, 2023	978-4-09-852868-4
8	April 18, 2024	978-4-09-853210-0
9	November 12, 2024	978-4-09-853702-0
10	March 18, 2026	978-4-09-854471-4
11	October 9, 2026	978-4-09-854846-0

=== Anime ===
An anime television series adaptation was announced on March 18, 2026. The series will be produced by Tezuka Productions and directed by Fumihiro Yoshimura, with Takashi Aoshima handling series composition, Daisuke Okushima designing the characters, and Shun Narita composing the music. It premiered on October 6, 2026, on AT-X and other channels. The opening theme song is "Sugar Salt" (シュガーソルト), performed by Masayoshi Ōishi, and the ending theme song is "Hatsukoi Reply" (初恋リプライ; 'First Love Reply'), performed by HoneyWorks featuring Sara Hoshikawa. Crunchyroll is streaming the series under the title The Cold Sato-san Is Only Sweet to Me. Plus Media Networks Asia licensed the series in Southeast Asia for broadcast on Aniplus Asia.

==== Episodes ====
No.	Title	Directed by (Note: Production staff information is taken from the ending credits of each episode.)	Written by	Storyboard by	Original release date
1	"The Cold Sato-San"; Transliteration: "Tsumetai Satō-san" (Japanese: 冷たい佐藤さん)	Unknown	Unknown	TBA	October 6, 2026
While working at his family's café, high schooler Sota spots his famously beautiful yet icy classmate, Sato, awkwardly trying to photograph her dessert. When three customers harass her, Sota uses his intimidatingly muscular father, Seizaemon, the café’s soft-hearted chef, to scare them off. A surprisingly emotional Sato admits her cold persona is a mask for severe shyness, which has left her friendless. She hoped to connect with others by becoming a social media influencer, but struggles to take decent photos. Sota reveals he manages the café’s social media account and is a skilled photographer, offering to teach her. Sato accepts, though she accidentally takes a joint selfie of herself and him, which flusters them both but she secretly keeps. After she leaves, it’s revealed that Sota has been in love with Sato since they first met in middle school, but was heartbroken when she seemed not to recognize him in high school. However, Sato secretly fell for him in middle school too, but her shyness made her act cold towards him when they reunited. For her, running into Sota at the café and getting a decent photograph of him made her very happy.
2	"A Second First Love"; Transliteration: "Nidome no Hatsukoi" (Japanese: 二度目の初恋)	Unknown	Unknown	TBA	October 13, 2026
Sota’s friend Ren notes that Sato has been staring intently at Sota all morning, sparking classroom gossip when a panicking Sato loudly asks for his phone number. Sota agrees, assuming she simply wants help making friends. He takes her to a bubble tea café to practice photography, preventing her from taking embarrassing photos after she attempts to mimic nearby influencers taking lewd pictures. Encouraged by Sota taking a good photo for her, Sato invites him to get rolled ice cream over the weekend, but he declines, leaving her upset. That week, Sato avoids Sota at school, and on Saturday, she gets ice cream alone and posts her first photo. Meanwhile, Seizaemon scolds Sota for rejecting her without telling her it was because he works at the café on the weekend. After sharing an exaggerated story of how he met Sota's mother, he hires his similarly muscular friends to cover the weekend shift so Sota can have free time. Sato struggles to enjoy her ice cream alone. Suddenly, Sota arrives, having tracked her down using visual clues from her posted picture. Showing her his own early, terrible photos, Sota promises to accompany her on future photography trips. Touched by his support, Sato falls in love with him all over again.
3	"The End of Their Mutual Crush"; Transliteration: "Ryōomai no Owari" (Japanese: 両想いの終わり)	Unknown	Unknown	TBA	October 20, 2026
Sota and Sato plan a weekend trip to Omi, causing mutual nervousness since Sota secretly intends to confess his feelings. To prepare, Ren has his sister Shizuku help Sota pick an outfit at their family's clothing store, while Sato gets the same help from her cousin Rinka and friend Mayo at another shop. As the two shops are adjacent, this leads to an accidental meeting where they awkwardly compliment each other's new outfits. While eavesdropping, Rinka is nearly hit by a truck, and Sota saves her, sustaining an injury. Rinka develops a crush on Sota, instantly feeling guilty for liking Sato's crush. While treating Sota, Mayo remarks that his feelings are obvious to everyone except Sato, which disheartens Sota. Meanwhile, Sato's strict father scolds her for coming home late. Simultaneously, a slightly drunk Shizuku encourages Sota to be bolder, then snatches his phone to text Sato a confession. Sato panics in the bath, but Sota calls before she can reply. Believing he isn't being honest, Sato cancels the trip. Panicking over the botched text, Sota suddenly confesses properly over the phone. Overjoyed, Sato accidentally ends the call, which Sota mistakes for a rejection.
4	"Magic"; Transliteration: "Mahō" (Japanese: 魔法)	TBA	TBA	TBA	October 27, 2026
Sato is thrilled Sota likes her, though Sota mistakenly believes he was rejected. Upon learning this, Rinka immediately requests Sota's phone number. Sota is confused when Sato acts normally to him, asking to post their selfie on social media and anticipating their upcoming date to Omi. Sato's father, Kazuhara, confiscates her phone and grounds her, cancelling the trip. Sota bravely insists on speaking to Kazuhara in person. At a café, Sota accuses Kazuhara of controlling Sato. Kazuhara defends his actions, citing Sato's history of misinterpreting social situations and the risk her social media addiction poses to her education. Sota acknowledges the risk, but argues against stopping her from doing what she loves. Showing Kazuhara the sunset from the café garden, Sota explains that Sato's photos capture moments worth preserving. Touched, Kazuhara admits there is value in her hobby and reveals the truth: he grounded Sato and took her phone only because she exhausted the family's mobile data, requiring a trip to the phone shop together. Relieved, Sota realizes Kazuhara is simply a socially awkward parent, just like Sato. After Sato apologizes, Kazuhara returns her phone them reminisces with Seizaemon, his old classmate. Sato finally confesses her feelings to Sota, leaving them both in tears.
5	"Now Serving: Mutual Feelings"; Transliteration: "Koyoi wa Sōshi Sōai" (Japanese: 今宵は相思相愛)	TBA	TBA	TBA	November 3, 2026
On their date to Omi Sota manages to take photos and hand-feed Sato shaved ice. The next day, Ren notes Sota let the date end too quickly and did not even hold Sato's hand. Both Sato and Sota text Rinka for advice, and Rinka accidentally sends an invitation to her house to Sota instead of Sato. When Sota arrives she tries to act normally and shows him shojo manga to give him date ideas. She ends up asking what attracted him to Sato, who despite being cute is clumsy and awkward. When Sota claims not to know yet, Rinka decides to give up on loving him for Sato's sake. Sota trips and accidentally performs a "wall slap" with Rinka, making her realise she cannot give up yet and begins actively planning to steal him for herself. As summer break is approaching, Seizaemon suggests taking Sato to the beach. Sato asks her rebellious mother for advice, and is told to have sex with Sota as soon as it feels right. Sota invites her to his grandmothers beach inn with Mayo, Ren, Shizuku and Rinka. At first, Sato panics that he might be planning an orgy, exasperating her parents before she calms down. Seizaemon scolds Sota for inviting everybody instead of just going as a couple with Sato. Sato panics again, realising she will need a swimsuit.
6	"The Beach, a Cat, and Love Talk"; Transliteration: "Sunahama to Neko to Koi Bana" (Japanese: 砂浜と猫と恋バナ)	TBA	TBA	TBA	November 10, 2026
At the beach, Sato tries taking a cat photo. Sota meows to attract the cat, prompting Sato to record him before accidentally falling on him. The cat’s owner, delinquent Madoka, is thrilled to meet them upon learning Sota is related to innkeeper Kanami. Kanami, a grumpy woman, promptly whacks Sota for calling her "granny" instead of aunt. Madoka is disappointed the couple has no interesting stories of "doing it." Sato admits she fears change, but Madoka warns that lack of change brings regret, sharing that she still loves her childhood friend whom she lost touch with after moving across the country. When the group arrives, Madoka is shocked to spot her friend, Ren, who doesn't seem to recognize her. Sato offers to help her confess. Over dinner, Rinka tries hand-feeding Sota, but his polite rejection only increases her affection. Later at the beach, Ren is unusually grumpy. Shizuku and Mayo debut their bikinis, outraged by Sota's indifference, though he embarrasses Rinka by calling her modest swimsuit cute. Hiding under a blanket out of embarrassment, Sato is left alone with Sota to watch the ocean. When she steps into the water for photos, a wave washes her blanket away, exposing a sexy bikini. A stunned Sota compliments her just before Sato starts screaming.
7	"The Lovers' Lock"; Transliteration: "Koibito-tachi no Nankinjō" (Japanese: 恋人たちの南京錠)	TBA	TBA	TBA	November 17, 2026
Madoka sees Sato flee the beach. When Sota tries to follow, Shizuku and Mayo stop him, warning that coddling Sato will make her overdependent on him, leaving Rinka to try get Sota's attention. Madoka finds Sato hiding nearby and scolds her for ruining the trip despite buying a bikini to grow closer to Sota. Giving Sato a padlock, Madoka explains the local lovers' tradition of adding a lock to the observation deck fence for a long relationship. Returning to the beach, Sato is cornered by the three unpleasant customers from Seizaemon's café, now drunk and belligerent. Sota intervenes and the drunks decide to fight him. However, Ren interrupts by tossing Madoka's cat Leo at them, with Madoka's fury sending the drunks fleeing. Sato realizes Sota acted brave, despite his fear, to protect her. Madoka is pleased Ren’s distant behaviour proves he never forgot her. Back at the inn, Kanami reveals she is renovating the inn into a beach café thanks to her own social media. At sunset, Sato and Sota attach their padlock at the observation deck. Sato finally calls Sota by his first name, startling him so much he falls over, allowing Mayo to snap a compromising photo. That night, Leo leads Madoka to the deck, where Ren is attempting to remove their old padlock. Finding it rusted shut, they leave it and decide to talk while awaiting Ren’s train.
8	"Can't Help Falling In Love With You"; Transliteration: "Suki ni Narazu ni Irarenai" (Japanese: 好きにならずにいられない)	TBA	TBA	TBA	November 24, 2026

== Reception ==
The obi in the eighth volume of the manga reported that it had collectively sold over 1.2 million copies both physically and digitally. The light novel was nominated in four categories at the 2019 Ranobe News Online Awards. The manga adaptation was one of two winners of the Men's Comic Prize at the 2022 Digital Comic Awards.

== See also ==
- My Death Flags Show No Sign of Ending, another light novel series by the same illustrator
