= StylipS =

Japanese pop band

- Origin: Japan
- Genres: J-Pop, Dance-pop, Anison
- Years active: 2011–2016
- Label: Lantis
- Members: Arisa Noto; Moe Toyota; Miku Itou
- Past members: Yui Ogura; Kaori Ishihara; Maho Matsunaga
- Website: official site of StylipS

Stylips (stylized as StylipS) was a Japanese pop idol group, specialized in performing anime soundtracks.

== Career ==
In 2011, four voice actresses: Arisa Noto, Yui Ogura (from the pop idol group YuiKaori), Kaori Ishihara (also from YuiKaori) and Maho Matsunaga, formed their new musical project. On December 18, they made their first appearance with the song "Brand-new Style!! ~Mahou Mitai na Show Time~" (Brand-new Style!! 〜魔法みたいなShow time〜, lit. 'Brand-new Style!! ~Magic like Show Time~').

On February 8, 2012, they made their major debut with their single "Study x Study", which is used as the ending theme to the 2012 TV anime High School DxD. Their second single "Miracle Rush" was released on May 16, 2012, and is used as the opening theme to the 2012 anime Saki Achiga-hen Episode of Side-A. On August 22, they released their third single "Choose me Darling", which is the opening theme to the 2012 anime Nakaimo - My Sister Is Among Them!.

On April 20, 2013, it was announced that both Yui Ogura and Kaori Ishihara would graduate from StylipS on the 21st of April to focus on studies and in their career as voice actors. April 28, new members, Moe Toyota and Miku Itō, were announced to join the group. The new members were personally picked by Arisa and Maho. The two were also both from Style Cube Kenshuusei.

Their fourth single "Prism Sympathy" was released on July 16, 2013, and is used as the ending theme to the 2013 anime Fate/kaleid liner Prisma Illya, featuring the new lineup with Moe and Miku.

Their fifth single "Nova Revolution" was released on February 26, 2014, and is used as the ending theme to the 2014 Original Net Anime Donyatsu

Their sixth single "Junsui na Fujunbutsu/Spica" was released on May 24, 2014, and is used as the opening and ending theme to the 2014 anime The Comic Artist and His Assistants

Their Seventh single "Mayomayo Compass wa Iranai" was released on March 4, 2015, and is used as the second ending theme of the 2014 anime Gundam Build Fighters Try

Their Eighth single "Give Me Secret", which was released on May 27, 2015, is used as the ending theme to the 2015 anime High School DxD BorN

On May 23, 2016, StylipS announced that Maho Matsunaga has graduated from the group and retired from voice acting to pursue other work, including DJing.

== Members ==
Current

- Arisa Noto
- Moe Toyota
- Miku Itou

Former

- Yui Ogura
- Kaori Ishihara
- Maho Matsunaga

Timeline

== Discography ==
=== Albums ===
==== Anniversary Albums ====
Year	Album details	Catalog No.	Peak Oricon chart positions
2013	Step One!!: Released: January 9, 2013; Label: Lantis; Format: CD	KICS-35267 (Regular Edition), KICS-15267 (Limited Edition)	13
2014	The Supernova Strikes: Released: November 26, 2014; Label: Lantis; Format: CD	LACA-15464 (Regular Edition), LACA-35463 (Limited Edition A), LACA-35464 (Limited Edition B)	54

==== Best Album ====
Year	Album details	Catalog No.	Peak Oricon chart positions
2013	THE LIGHTNING CELEBRATION: Released: April 24, 2013; Label: Lantis; Format: CD	LACA-35294 & LACA-35295 (Regular Edition), KICS-15295 (Limited Edition)	9

=== Singles ===
Year	Song	Catalog No.	Peak Oricon chart positions	Album
2012	"Study x Study" (High School DxD ending theme): Released: February 8, 2012; Label: Lantis; Format: CD	LACM-4905 (Regular Edition), LACM-34905 (Limited Edition)	18	
2012	"Miracle Rush" (Saki Achiga-hen Episode of Side-A opening theme): Released: May 16, 2012; Label: Lantis; Format: CD	LACM-4920 (Regular Edition), LACM-34920 (Limited Edition)	13	
2012	"Choose me Darling (Choose me♡ダーリン)" (Nakaimo - My Sister Is Among Them! opening theme): Released: August 22, 2012; Label: Lantis; Format: CD	LACM-4974 (Regular Edition), LACM-34974 (Limited Edition)	10	
2013	"Prism Sympathy" (Fate/kaleid liner Prisma Illya ending theme): Released: July 24, 2013; Label: Lantis; Format: CD	LACM-14112 (Regular Edition), LACM-34112 (Limited Edition)	26	
2014	"Nova Revolution (NOVAレボリューション)" (Donyatsu ending theme): Released: February 26, 2014; Label: Lantis; Format: CD	LACM-14196 (Regular Edition), LACM-34195 (Limited Edition)	77	
2014	"Junsui na Fujunbutsu/Spica (純粋なフジュンブツ)" (The Comic Artist and His Assistants opening and ending theme): Released: May 24, 2014; Label: Lantis; Format: CD	LACM-14218 (Regular Edition), LACM-14217 (Limited Edition)	46	
2015	"Mayomayo Compass wa Iranai" (Gundam Build Fighters Try second ending theme): Released: March 4, 2015; Label: Lantis; Format: CD	LACM-14319 (Artist Edition), LACM-14320 (Anime Edition)	37	
2015	"Give Me Secret" (High School DxD BorN ending theme): Released: May 27, 2015; Label: Lantis; Format: CD	LACM-34349 (Limited Edition), LACM-14349 (Regular Edition)	49	

== See also ==
- Ro-Kyu-Bu!
- YuiKaori
- HAPPY!STYLE Rookies
