= List of ASCII Media Works games =

ASCII Media Works is a Japanese publishing company, and the result of the merger between ASCII and MediaWorks on April 1, 2008 where MediaWorks legally absorbed ASCII. MediaWorks began developing and publishing video games with their Super Famicom port of Emerald Dragon in July 1995. Since ASCII Media Works is a continuation of MediaWorks, the company includes the video games previously produced before the merger with ASCII on their official website for their video games. Many of the video games have been adapted from light novels published by ASCII Media Works under their Dengeki Bunko imprint such as Shakugan no Shana, Kino's Journey, and Spice and Wolf, among others.

== Video games ==
=== MediaWorks ===
==== Console games ====
Title	Developer(s)	Platform(s)	Original release	Region(s) released
Emerald Dragon	Alfa System, Glodia	Super Famicom, PC Engine	July 28, 1995	JP
Eternal Melody	MediaWorks	Sega Saturn, PlayStation	October 4, 1996	JP
AnEarth Fantasy Stories The First Volume	Hudson Soft, MediaWorks	Sega Saturn	March 28, 1997	JP
Yūkyū Gensokyō	Starlight Marry	Sega Saturn, PlayStation	July 18, 1997	JP
Yūkyū Gensokyō 2nd Album	Starlight Marry	Sega Saturn, PlayStation	February 26, 1998	JP
Ojō-sama Express	MediaWorks	Sega Saturn, PlayStation	July 1998	JP
Hoshi no Oka Gakuen Monogatari Gakuensai	Aterier Sai	PlayStation	October 22, 1998	JP
Yūkyū Gensokyō Ensemble	Starlight Marry	Sega Saturn, PlayStation	December 10, 1998	JP
Device Reign	Starlight Marry	Sega Saturn, PlayStation	February 25, 1999	JP
Yūkyū Gensokyō Ensemble 2	Starlight Marry	Sega Saturn, PlayStation	March 4, 1999	JP
Oukahouzin: Ouka Sakishi Toki	Exe-Create	Dreamcast	December 16, 1999	JP
Yūkyū Gensokyō 3 Perpetual Blue	Starlight Marry	PlayStation, Dreamcast	December 22, 1999	JP
Dirt Champ Motocross No. 1	Funcom	PlayStation	January 6, 2000	JP
Yūkyū Kumikyoku All Star Project	Starlight Marry	PlayStation	August 24, 2000	JP
Happy Lesson: First Lesson	Datam Polystar	Dreamcast	September 28, 2000	JP
Sister Princess	MediaWorks	PlayStation, Dreamcast	March 8, 2001	JP
Happy Lesson	Datam Polystar	Dreamcast	April 26, 2001	JP
Sister Princess: Pure Stories	MediaWorks	PlayStation	December 13, 2001	JP
Sister Princess 2	MediaWorks	PlayStation	March 20, 2003	JP
Kino's Journey: The Beautiful World	Tycoon	PlayStation 2	July 17, 2003	JP
Sister Princess 2: Premium Fan Disc	MediaWorks	PlayStation	November 13, 2003	JP
DearS	Vridge	PlayStation 2	June 24, 2004	JP
Futakoi	MediaWorks	PlayStation 2	December 9, 2004	JP
Futakoi Alternative: Koi to Shōjo to Machine Gun	Vridge	PlayStation 2	June 23, 2005	JP
Strawberry Marshmallow	MediaWorks	PlayStation 2	August 11, 2005	JP
Futakoi-jima: Koi to Mizugi no Survival	MediaWorks	PlayStation 2	August 25, 2005	JP
Kino's Journey II: The Beautiful World	Tycoon	PlayStation 2	December 1, 2005	JP
Shakugan no Shana	Vridge	PlayStation 2	March 23, 2006	JP
Kashimashi: Girl Meets Girl The First Summer Story	Vridge	PlayStation 2	March 30, 2006	JP
Strawberry Panic! Girls' School in Fullbloom	MediaWorks	PlayStation 2	August 24, 2006	JP
Nanatsuiro Drops Pure!!	UNiSONSHIFT, Vridge	PlayStation 2	September 20, 2007	JP

==== Portable games ====
Title	Developer	Platform	Original release	Region(s) released
Sister Princess RePure	MediaWorks	Game Boy Advance	March 20, 2003	JP
Allison	Netchubiyori	Nintendo DS	December 7, 2006	JP
Inukami! feat. Animation	Netchubiyori	Nintendo DS	December 7, 2006	JP
Iriya no Sora, UFO no Natsu	Netchubiyori	Nintendo DS	January 11, 2007	JP
Shakugan no Shana DS	Vridge	Nintendo DS	March 29, 2007	JP
Iriya no Sora, UFO no Natsu II	Netchubiyori	Nintendo DS	October 25, 2007	JP
Baccano!	Netchubiyori	Nintendo DS	February 28, 2008	JP

=== ASCII Media Works ===
==== Console games ====
Title	Developer	Platform	Original release	Region(s) released
Nogizaka Haruka no Himitsu: Cosplay Hajimemashita	Vridge	PlayStation 2	September 25, 2008	JP

==== Portable games ====
Title	Developer	Platform	Original release	Region(s) released
Nanatsuiro Drops DS: Touch de Hajimaru Hatsukoi Monogatari	UNiSONSHIFT	Nintendo DS	May 15, 2008	JP
Spice and Wolf: Holo's and My One Year	Netchubiyori	Nintendo DS	June 26, 2008	JP
Dengeki Gakuen RPG: Cross of Venus	Pegasus Japan	Nintendo DS	March 19, 2009	JP
Hoshizora Navi	AstroArts	Nintendo DS	March 26, 2009	JP
Spice and Wolf: The Wind that Spans the Sea	Netchubiyori	Nintendo DS	September 17, 2009	JP
Kamonohashi Kamo. Aimai Seikatsu no Susume	San-X	Nintendo DS	December 3, 2009	JP
Dear Girl Stories Hibiki: Hibiki Tokkun Daisakusen!	ASCII Media Works	Nintendo DS	December 17, 2009	JP
Nogizaka Haruka no Himitsu: Dōjinshi Hajimemashita	Vridge	PlayStation Portable	February 26, 2010	JP
Marriage Royale: Prism Story	Vridge	PlayStation Portable	April 28, 2010	JP
Durarara!! 3way Standoff	Netchubiyori	PlayStation Portable	September 22, 2010	JP
Twinkle Crusaders GoGo!	Lillian	PlayStation Portable	September 30, 2010	JP
Toaru Majutsu no Index	Kadokawa Games	PlayStation Portable	January 27, 2011	JP
Dengeki Gakuen RPG: Cross of Venus Special	Pegasus Japan	Nintendo DS	February 10, 2011	JP
Fish On	Sims	Nintendo 3DS	June 9, 2011	JP
Durarara!! 3way Standoff -alley-	Netchubiyori	PlayStation Portable	August 25, 2011	JP
Ro-Kyu-Bu!	Vridge	PlayStation Portable	October 27, 2011	JP
Toaru Kagaku no Railgun	Kadokawa Games	PlayStation Portable	December 8, 2011	JP
Let's Try Bass Fishing Fish On Next	Sims	PlayStation Vita	March 29, 2012	JP
Koi to Senkyo to Chocolate Portable	Kadokawa Games	PlayStation Portable	September 27, 2012	JP
Koi wa Rule ni Shibararenai!	Vridge	PlayStation Portable	November 29, 2012	JP
Sakura-sō no Pet na Kanojo	Netchubiyori	PlayStation Portable, PlayStation Vita	February 14, 2013	JP
Horizon in the Middle of Nowhere Portable	Tenky	PlayStation Portable	April 25, 2013	JP
Ro-Kyu-Bu! Himitsu no Otoshimono	Vridge	PlayStation Portable	June 20, 2013	JP
Golden Time: Vivid Memories	Kadokawa Games	PlayStation Vita	March 27, 2014	JP
Ro-Kyu-Bu! Naisho no Shutter Chance	Vridge	PlayStation Vita	March 27, 2014	JP
Durarara!! 3way Standoff -alley- V	Netchubiyori	PlayStation Vita	June 19, 2014	JP
Love Live! School Idol Paradise	Dingo	PlayStation Vita	August 28, 2014	JP
Durarara!! Relay	Netchubiyori	PlayStation Vita	January 29, 2015	JP
