= Dengeki G's Radio =

- Genre: Radio drama
- Running time: 30 minutes
- Country of origin: Japan
- Home station: Nippon Cultural Broadcasting
- Hosted by: Natsuko Kuwatani; Hisayo Mochizuki
- Original release: October 13, 2002 – June 27, 2004
- Website: Dengeki G's Radio

Dengeki G's Radio (電撃G's Radio) was a radio program broadcast by Nippon Cultural Broadcasting between October 13, 2002, and June 27, 2004, and was produced by MediaWorks for Dengeki G's Magazine, a bishōjo game magazine MediaWorks publishes. There were ninety regular broadcasts airing once a week every Sunday between 11:00 PM and 11:30 PM. A single sixty-minute special was broadcast on December 2, 2006, called Dengeki G's Radio 2006.

== History ==
The program began as a tie-up with a radio program which had been previously broadcast for Sister Princess called Sister Princess: Onii-chan to Issho, and the same personalities for that program, Natsuko Kuwatani and Hisayo Mochizuki, were used starting with the fifteenth broadcast on January 19, 2003. Two others who were cast in the Sister Princess anime series, Yumiko Kobayashi and Nana Mizuki of the unit Prits, also made regular appearances on the program. An audition was held for to create a protegee group for Prits known as Puppy's which consisted of Yasuko Itō, Shizuka Hasegawa and Ai Matayoshi; the members in Puppy's were also regular members to Dengeki G's Radio.

Going off of Sister Princess' success, the editors for Dengeki G's Magazine decided to start a listener-participation game written by the same author of Sister Princess: Sakurako Kimino. This new game was called Puppy Girls: Watashi no Ojisama, though it was decided to cancel the game and Dengeki G's Radio itself mid-way to make way for a radio drama for Dengeki G's Magazine's main reader-participation game at the time: Futakoi.

== Puppy Girls: Watashi no Ojisama ==
Puppy Girls: Watashi no Ojisama (パピー・ガールズ～わたしのおじさま～, Papī Gāruzu ~Watashi no Ojisama~) was an original listener-participation game on Dengeki G's Radio, written by Sakurako Kimino. The concept was that the listeners of the program would be able to send in postcards of what they would like to hear in a radio drama for the characters in the series. The game started with the eighteenth broadcast on February 9, 2003, and ended with the forty-seventh broadcast on August 31, 2003, though was cancelled pre-maturely. A segment of the game ran in Dengeki G's Magazine between the March and October 2003 issues, with accompanied illustrations by Pururu Kinkakuji.

Premise
The story of a group of five orphaned sisters.
Characters

Tamaki (たまき)Voiced by: Natsuko Kuwatani Eldest sister. Komako (こまこ)Voiced by: Hisayo Mochizuki Second-eldest sister. Mahiru (まひる)Voiced by: Ai Matayoshi Third-eldest sister.	Hisoka (ひそか)Voiced by: Yasuko Itō Fourth-eldest sister. Kotora (ことら)Voiced by: Shizuka Hasegawa Youngest sister.
