= Eternal Fantasy =

2007 video game

- Cover art of the limited edition of the game
- Developer: Circus
- Platform: Microsoft Windows
- Release: JP: November 22, 2007
- Genres: Eroge, visual novel, role-playing video game
- Mode: Single-player

Disambiguation: for the 1998 film, see Galaxy Express 999: Eternal Fantasy

Eternal Fantasy (エターナルファンタジー, Etānaru Fantajī) is a Japanese adult visual novel developed by Circus, released on November 22, 2007 for Microsoft Windows, as both a standard edition and a limited edition. The gameplay in Eternal Fantasy follows a linear plot line, which offers pre-determined scenarios and courses of interaction, and focuses on the appeal of the main female characters, but differs from traditional visual novel in that the player is allowed to navigate in an overworld map from a top-down perspective, and its utilization of a combat system.

== Gameplay ==
A conversation in Eternal Fantasy depicting the main character talking to Arcie

The gameplay in Eternal Fantasy utilizes three different styles of gameplay. The game features an overworld map and a combat system, typical to role-playing video games, and a visual novel system. While on the overworld map, a scaled-down depiction of the game's fictional landscape, the player is allowed to navigate between locations from a top-down perspective. Upon entering locations in the overworld map, the game shifts to a visual novel-style gameplay. Gameplay in this segment requires little player interaction, as most of the duration of the game is spent on simply reading the text that appears on the screen, which represents either dialogue between characters or the inner thoughts of the protagonists. Every so often, the player will come to a "decision point" where he or she is given the chance to choose from options that are displayed on the screen, typically two to three at a time. Gameplay pauses at these points until the player makes a choice, and depending on which choice the player makes, the plot will progress in a specific direction.

Battle in Eternal Fantasy

At times, the player will be engaged in combat. Combat in Eternal Fantasy utilizes a real-time battle system, with the player taking control of one member of the party, while other characters are controlled by AIs. Each character and enemy has a certain number of hit points. Players may reduce hit points by wounding targets using different types of physical and magical attacks, and may also restore their hit points by healing themselves using items. When a character loses all his or her hit points, he or she faints, and if all of the player's characters lose all of their hit points, the game ends, and the player may either restore their progress from a previously saved location or immediately before battle. Attacks from characters are restricted by a countdown gauge similar to Square Enix's Active Time Battle system, and players can only issue attacks and place movements when the gauge is completely empty.

There are multiple plot lines that the player will have the chance to experience. To view all of the plot lines, the player will need to replay the game multiple times, access different areas, and make different choices to progress the plot in an alternate direction. One of the goals of the gameplay is to view the hentai scenes, depicting one of the protagonists having sexual intercourse with one of the heroines.

== Development ==
Eternal Fantasy is the tenth game developed by Circus' Northern subdivision, not counting re-releases, and is their first game not in the Da Capo canon since AR: Forgotten Summer. Eternal Fantasy is notable for having a large development team for a visual novel. The producer for the visual novel is Tororo, who has also produced and composed for most of Circus Northern's past titles. Planning and the original story was done by Futsumamu, who also contributed in character designs, along with Eko, Natsuki Tanihara, Soba Aki, Narumi, and Mochi Chinochi. Scenario work was split between six people, Masaki Sonoda, Fumihiko Kuwabara, Shingo Hifumi, Aiha, Mori no Me, and Shin Gotō.

=== Release history ===
A free demo version of Eternal Fantasy was released online on November 10, 2007. The demo introduced players to the characters and the gameplay. The full game was released on November 22, 2007, as both a limited edition and a regular edition. The limited edition contained the game itself, a 64-page book containing development materials, a fully colored 20 page illustration book, a special original soundtrack disc, and a map of the Gladio peninsula; the regular edition did not contain the aforementioned extras.

== Related media ==
=== Internet radio show ===
An internet radio titled D.C. to EF being produced by Onsen began streaming online on October 11, 2007. The show is based on Eternal Fantasy and Da Capo II, and is hosted by Ai Hinaki, Hijiri Kinomi, and Aya Tachibana, who voiced Locomoco, Farte, and Arcie in the visual novel, respectively. Two sets of two CDs, each containing thirteen episodes previously streamed online, and a special episode were released on August 15, 2008.

== Cast ==
- Carolina - Hikaru Kaga
- Arche - Aya Tachibana
- Farute - Hijiri Kinomi
- Ryurika - Megumi Haruka
- Euretta - Ayako Nakagawa
- Rokomoko - Ai Hinaki
- Prills - Minami Hokuto
- Saint - Minami Hokuto
- Witch - Minami Hokuto
- Tiraiyuru - Ayumu Nakazawa
- Idea - Shinsuke Fukui
- Ron - Ryou Itou
- Efumeru - Mayumi Shindou
- Erehia - Sayaka Aoki/Rumiko Sasaki
- Feresu - Hijiri Kinomi
- Scotti - Hideyuki Umedsu

=== Audio CDs ===
Eternal Fantasy has three main theme songs, the opening theme is "Eternal Fantasy: Love is like a Flower that Spreads over the World" (Eternal Fantasy 〜愛は世界に遍く花のように〜, Eternal Fantasy ~Ai wa Sekai ni Amaneku Hana no Yōni~), the ending theme is Love's Song (愛の詩, Ai no Uta), and the grand ending theme is When that Flower Blooms (あの花の咲く頃に, Ano Hana no Saku Koro ni). The opening theme and the ending theme were performed by Sena and were written by Tororo, while the grand ending theme was performed by Aki Misato. The main theme songs were accompanied by eight insert songs, six for each of the heroines, one for boss battles, and one played during the climax of the storyline. Arcie's insert song is "Trust My Way" and was performed by Yoshino; Farte's insert song is "Pieces of Times" (時のカケラ, Toki no Kakera), and was performed by Hīko; Lyrica's insert song is "A New Light" (あらたな光, Arata na Hikari), and was performed by Ceui; Euretta's insert song is "Flowers that Blooms in the Heart" (心に咲く花, Kokoro ni Saku Hana), and was performed by Aki Misato; Locomoco's insert song is "Solution" (解, Kai), and was performed by Jun Miruno; and lastly, Pril's insert song is "The Little Saint's Song" (小聖女の唄, Shōseijo no Uta), and was performed by Yōsei Teikoku. The boss battle theme is "Last Fight" and was performed by Elefant, and the climax insert theme is "Dawn's Prayers" (暁の祈り, Akatsuki no Inori), performed by Sena.

The first music album released was a maxi single titled "Eternal Fantasy: Ai wa Sekai ni Amaneku Hana no Yōni", and was released on December 26, 2007 containing the opening and ending themes. The visual novel's original soundtrack was released on January 23, 2008 containing fifty-eight background music tracks on two discs. It was later followed by a vocal album, entitled Songs from Eternal Fantasy released on February 27, 2007, containing the theme songs and the insert songs used in the game. An image song album titled Destination for Arcie was released on March 26, 2008, containing six vocal songs and four instrumental pieces. All the vocal pieces were written and sung by Sena, while Lavi composed the instrumental pieces.

Four image song singles were also released for the heroines featured in Eternal Fantasy, featuring the voice actors from the visual novel. The first single, for Arcie, was released on April 23, 2008; the second single, for Locomoco, was released on May 21, 2008; the third single, for Lyrica, was released on June 25, 2008; the fourth single, for Farte, was released on July 23, 2008; and a fifth single, for Euretta, will be released on August 27, 2008.

== Reception and sales ==
According to a national ranking of bishōjo games based on amounts sold in Japan, Eternal Fantasy was placed in fifth place for the most pre-ordered bishōjo games during mid-September to mid-October prior to the release of the game. After the game was released, Eternal Fantasy premiered at the first place out of fifty during the month of November, and was then dropped to the twenty-eighth the following month, before dropping to the forty-sixth place the following month, making its final appearance on the charts.
