= Ohime-sama Navigation =

Japanese manga series

- Hime (top-left), Kari (bottom-left), and Crystal (right) of Ohime-sama Navigation.

おひめさまナビゲーション (Ohime-sama Nabigēshon)
- Genre: Harem
- Light novel
- Written by: Satz
- Illustrated by: Naru Nanao
- Published by: ASCII Media Works
- Magazine: Dengeki G's Magazine
- Original run: February 2008 – May 2011
- Manga

Hime Navi & Hime Navi Evolution
- Written by: Satz
- Illustrated by: Raina
- Published by: ASCII Media Works
- Magazine: Dengeki G's Magazine
- Original run: June 2008 – June 2010
- Volumes: 1
- Manga
- Written by: Satz
- Illustrated by: Yūki Takami
- Published by: ASCII Media Works
- Magazine: Dengeki G's Magazine
- Original run: November 2008 – June 2010
- Volumes: 3

Ohime-sama Navigation (おひめさまナビゲーション, Ohime-sama Nabigēshon; lit. Princess Navigation), with the subtitles Otogibanashi Uranai (おとぎばなしうらない; lit. Fairy tale divination) and Which Girl do you Trust?, is a reader-participation game in the Japanese bishōjo magazine Dengeki G's Magazine, published by ASCII Media Works, which ran between the February 2008 and May 2011 issues. The project had been first announced in the two-hundredth issue of Dengeki G's Magazine released in the October 2007 issue, and the project itself is a form of commemoration for the achievement. Ohime-sama Navigation's premise is written by Satz, and the character design is by Naru Nanao, known for her artistry on D.C.: Da Capo by Circus and Ef: A Fairy Tale of the Two by Minori. A manga adaptation entitled Hime Navi was serialized between the June 2008 and June 2010 issues of Dengeki G's Magazine illustrated by Raina, and a second manga using the original title was serialized in the same magazine between the November 2008 and June 2010 issues illustrated by Yūki Takami.

== Plot ==
=== Story ===
Ohime-sama Navigation revolves around three young girls enrolled at a fortune-telling school named Kaisen Academy. Each is learning different forms of fortune-telling at the school, though they are in the same class and have the same homeroom teacher — Mai Komura.

=== Characters ===
Crystal Hoshikawa (星河 クリスタル, Hoshikawa Kurisutaru)
Crystal is a girl dressed like a witch. She was born on February 10, and has O type blood, making her a "Little Red Riding Hood"-type princess.
Hime Kaguyama (香久山 日冥, Kaguyama Hime)
Hime is a girl dressed like a miko. She was born on July 21, and has AB type blood, making her a "Princess Kaguya"-type princess.
Kari Nano (菜野 花里, Nano Kari)
Kari is a girl dressed in a Southeast Asia style. She was born on May 4 and has A type blood, making her a "Snow Queen"-type princess.
Mai Komura (米村 米, Komura Mai)
Mai is the homeroom teacher to Cystal, Hime, and Kari.

=== Princess types ===
		A type blood	B type blood	O type blood	AB type blood
Aries	March 21—April 19	The Snow Queen	Little Red Riding Hood	The Little Mermaid	Cinderella
Taurus	April 20—May 20	The Snow Queen	Sleeping Beauty	The Crane's Requital of a Favor	Princess Kaguya
Gemini	May 21—June 21	The Snow Queen	Thumbelina	Sleeping Beauty	Princess Kaguya
Cancer	June 22—July 22	Snow White	Thumbelina	Princess Kaguya	Princess Kaguya
Leo	July 23—August 22	Snow White	The Little Mermaid	Thumbelina	Cinderella
Virgo	August 23—September 22	Snow White	Little Red Riding Hood	Princess Kaguya	Sleeping Beauty
Libra	September 23—October 23	Sleeping Beauty	The Crane's Requital of a Favor	Cinderella	The Crane's Requital of a Favor
Scorpius	October 24—November 21	The Crane's Requital of a Favor	Snow White	Cinderella	Sleeping Beauty
Sagittarius	November 22—December 21	The Crane's Requital of a Favor	The Little Mermaid	The Little Mermaid	The Snow Queen
Capricornus	December 22—January 19	Thumbelina	Little Red Riding Hood	Cinderella	The Snow Queen
Aquarius	January 20—February 18	Princess Kaguya	Little Red Riding Hood	Little Red Riding Hood	Cinderella
Pisces	February 19—March 20	Snow White	The Little Mermaid	The Little Mermaid	Thumbelina

== Media ==
=== Reader-participation game ===
Ohime-sama Navigation is a reader-participation game that ran from the February 2008 to May 2011 issues of ASCII Media Works' bishōjo magazine Dengeki G's Magazine. Originally, the readers were given three heroines—Crystal Hoshikawa, Hime Kaguyama, and Kari Nano—and the readers were able to vote on their birth dates and blood types which would determine their "princess type" which corresponds to princess in fairy tales. The main part of the game is for the readers to give advice to the three heroines as they attend the fortune-telling school.

=== Manga ===
A manga adaptation entitled Hime Navi (ひめナビ, Hime Nabi) was serialized in ASCII Media Works' Dengeki G's Magazine between the June 2008 and June 2010 issues and is illustrated by Raina. Starting with chapter 14 released in the July 2009 issue, the title changed to Hime Navi Evolution (ひめナビevolution) and kept that title for the rest of the manga. The first volume of Hime Navi containing the first thirteen chapters was released on June 27, 2009, under ASCII Media Works' Dengeki Comics imprint. A second manga, entitled Ohime-sama Navigation, was serialized in the same magazine between the November 2008 and June 2010 issues and is illustrated by Yūki Takami. Three volumes of Ohime-sama Navigation were released between June 27, 2009, and August 27, 2010, under Dengeki Comics.
