= Kanao =

Kanao may refer to:

== People ==
- Kanao Araki, Japanese manga artist
- Kanao Inouye (1916–1947), Canadian criminal
- Tetsuo Kanao (born 1950), Japanese actor

== Fictional characters ==
- Kanao Tsuyuri, a character in the manga series Demon Slayer: Kimetsu no Yaiba
