= Da Capo II =

2006 video game

- Da Capo II original visual novel cover.

〜ダ・カーポII〜 (Da Kāpo II)
- Video game
- Developer: Circus
- Publisher: Circus; Kadokawa Shoten (PS2, PSP): NA: MangaGamer (Windows)
- Genre: Eroge, Visual novel
- Platform: Windows, PlayStation 2, PlayStation Portable
- Released: May 26, 2006 (Windows, limited ed.)
- Serial novel
- Written by: Circus
- Published by: Paradigm
- Original run: May 12, 2006 – June 25, 2007
- Volumes: 2
- Manga
- Written by: Circus
- Illustrated by: Syo Ryuga
- Published by: Kadokawa Shoten
- Magazine: Comptiq
- Original run: November 10, 2006 – September 10, 2009
- Volumes: 5
- Serial novel
- Written by: Tasuku Saika
- Published by: Paradigm
- Original run: November 24, 2006 – October 11, 2007
- Volumes: 7
- Manga

Da Capo II: Imaginary Future
- Written by: Circus
- Illustrated by: Tsukasa Uhana
- Published by: ASCII Media Works
- Magazine: Dengeki G's Magazine
- Original run: March 2007 – May 2009
- Volumes: 5
- Anime television series
- Directed by: Hideki Okamoto
- Written by: Katsumi Hasegawa
- Studio: Feel
- Original network: Chiba TV, Sun TV, TV Aichi
- Original run: October 1, 2007 – June 28, 2008
- Episodes: 26
- Original video animation

T.P. Sakura - Time Paladin Sakura - Jikū Bōeisen
- Directed by: Takehiro Nakayama
- Written by: Naoki Tozuka
- Music by: Tatsuya Kato
- Studio: Nomad
- Released: January 27, 2011 – February 24, 2011
- Runtime: 24 minutes each
- Episodes: 2
- Other games
- Da Capo (prequel); Da Capo III (sequel); Da Capo 4 (sequel)

Da Capo II (〜ダ・カーポII〜, Da Kāpo II; commonly abbreviated as D.C. II) is a Japanese adult visual novel developed by Circus which was first released on May 26, 2006, for Windows computers. It is a part of the ongoing Da Capo series of games by Circus, and is the direct sequel to Circus' previous title Da Capo released in 2002. Da Capo II is described by Circus as a "ticklish school romance adventure (こそばゆい学園恋愛アドベンチャー, Kosobayui Gakuen Renai Adobenchā). A fan disc, Da Capo II: Spring Celebration, was released on April 27, 2007, and features springtime stories set after the endings for each of the six Da Capo II heroines. An all-ages consumer port titled Da Capo II: Plus Situation containing additional scenarios was released for the PlayStation 2 in May 2008. The PlayStation 2 version was later ported to PC, titled Da Capo II: Plus Communication and containing the hentai scenes found in the original release, in December 2008.

There have been many drama CDs, and two separate sets of novels and manga created based on the original game. An anime adaptation aired in Japan between October and December 2007 on TV Aichi, and was also broadcast on other networks as well. A second season of the anime aired between April and June 2008; each anime season contained thirteen episodes and were produced by Feel. A sequel set 20 years after the end of Da Capo II, Da Capo III, was released on April 27, 2012.

== Gameplay ==
The gameplay in Da Capo II utilizes the same system used in Da Capo, in which little interaction is required from the player as most of the duration of the game is spent on simply reading the text that will appear on the screen; this text represents either dialogue between the various characters, or the inner thoughts of the protagonist. Every so often, the player will come to a "decision point" where he or she is given the chance to choose from options that are displayed on the screen, typically two to three at a time. During these times, gameplay pauses until a choice is made that furthers the plot in a specific direction, depending on which choice the player makes. The consequences of these decisions varies, in which they may either affect the protagonist, Yoshiyuki's action, or his location. At the beginning of the gameplay, the player will mostly be given choices based on the protagonist's actions, but is soon introduced to choices based on locations and the alarm clock. Choices based on locations are accompanied by an image of a heroine, to allow the choices to be easier. The player may also adjust the protagonist's alarm clock, determining the events which occurs the following morning in the game.

There are six main plot lines that the player will have the chance to experience, one for each of the heroines in the story. In order to view the six plot lines to their entirety, the player will have to replay the game multiple times and choose different choices during the decision points in order to further the plot in an alternate direction. The game is split into three main parts: the first story arc revolves around an upcoming Christmas party, the second arc takes place during the winter holiday break, and the last arc is back at school in the new year.

== Plot ==
Da Capo II takes place 53 years after the events of Da Capo, when Sakura Yoshino, weary of being alone for so long, wished upon a prototype artificial wish-granting magical cherry tree for a son—Yoshiyuki Sakurai. In the first arc, while Yoshiyuki attends Kazami Academy, beneath the school, he awakens Minatsu Amakase, a robot. Yoshiyuki helps her adapt to a life with humans despite robots being nothing more than mere tools. In the second arc, Yoshiyuki begins to harbor feelings for his stepsisters, Otome and Yume, the granddaughters of Jun'ichi and Nemu. However, the cherry tree starts malfunctioning, granting all wishes, regardless of how impure, which is causing numerous incidents to occur in Hatsune. The situation gradually worsens and Otome has to choose whether or not to wither the cherry tree, which would erase Yoshiyuki's existence in the process, so as to save Hatsune.

The game centers on Hatsunejima (初音島) the same island as Da Capo from the original story. Yoshiyuki Sakurai is the protagonist of the game. Sakura and Jun'ichi are the only returning characters, and Nemu is the only other Da Capo character to be mentioned by name. Moe, Mako, Kotori, Miharu, and Yoriko are also mentioned, but indirectly. Yume, Nanaka, Minatsu, and Sakura's themes are remixes of themes from previous Circus games. Yume, Minatsu, and Sakura's are remixes of Nemu, Miharu, and Sakura's from Da Capo, and Nanaka's is a remix of Sayaka's from Suika.

== Development ==
Da Capo II was Circus' twenty-ninth game, but was the eleventh game developed by the development group Circus Northern who had also produced their second title Suika and their fourth title Da Capo. The game's production was headed by Tororo, president of Circus, who also worked on the game's music with Comet Nekono who worked on the game's background music. The scenario in the game was divided between five people who worked on the different stories for the heroines who include Kōta Takeuchi who mainly worked on Minatsu's and Anzu's stories, the director of the project Chihare Ameno who wrote most of Otome's and Yume's scenarios, Mochizuki JET who wrote Nanaka's and Koko's stories, Nonoka Maihama as a scenario assistant, and Mori no Me. Initial character design was mainly created by Natsuki Tanihara, but GotoP designed Sakura's pet dog Harimao. Using Tanihara's designs, five more artists in addition to Tanihara illustrated the characters and settings used in the game; these artists include Mochi Chinochi, Mitsumamu, Yuka Kayura, Eko, and Meikai. Tanihara designed Yume, Minatsu, and Sakura; Chinochi designed Nanaka, Koko, and the supporting cast; Mitsumamu designed Anzu; and Kayura designed Otome.

=== Release history ===
On April 15, 2007, a free game demo of Da Capo II titled The Spring Breeze's Ultimate Battle! (春風のアルティメットバトル, Harukaze no Arutimetto Batoru) became available for download at Da Capo II's official website. The demo was a prologue to the story in Da Capo II. The full game was first introduced to the public in Japan as a limited edition version on May 26, 2006 as a DVD playable on a Microsoft Windows PC. The regular edition followed on June 23, 2006. A limited edition CD-ROM version of the game was released on July 7, 2006 A version compatible with the Windows Vista operating system for the PC was released on June 29, 2007. A "gratitude pack" edition of Da Capo II was released on January 25, 2008.

A version for the PlayStation 2 under the title Da Capo II: Plus Situation (〜ダ・カーポII〜 プラスシチュエーション) was released on May 29, 2008 in limited and regular editions. The PS2 version promoted three of the former supporting characters—Maya Sawai, Akane Hanasaki, and Mayuki Kōsaka—to become obtainable heroines, along with the introduction of three original heroines—Erika Murasaki, Mahiru Takanashi, and Aishia. An adult fan disc titled Circus Disc: Christmas Days (〜サーカスディスク クリスマスデイズ〜) was released by Circus for the PC as a limited edition DVD on December 22, 2006, and as a regular edition on January 1, 2007. The simplified gameplay in the fan disc allows the player to select the story they would like to see from the onset. A sequel to Christmas Days for the PC titled C.D.C.D.2 (シーディーシーディー2) was released on July 25, 2008. The PlayStation 2 version was later re-released for the PC, titled Da Capo II: Plus Communication and containing the hentai scenes found in the original release, on December 26, 2008. Bundled with Da Capo, the game was released as a PlayStation Portable version titled D.C.I&II P.S.P.: Da Capo I&II: Plus Situation Portable (D.C.I&II P.S.P. 〜ダ・カーポ I&II〜 プラスシチュエーション ポータブル) on October 28, 2010.

Another adult fan disc based on the Da Capo II visual novel titled Da Capo II: Spring Celebration (〜ダ・カーポII〜 スプリング セレブレイション, ~Da Kāpo II~ Supringu Serebureishon) was released by Circus on April 27, 2007 playable as a DVD on the PC in limited and regular editions. Spring Celebration features springtime stories set after the endings for each of the six Da Capo II heroines. The simplified gameplay in the sequel allows the player to select which of the heroines' stories will be played through from the onset. An adult spin-off title called Da Capo: Poker (〜ダ・カーポーカー〜) was released by Circus on February 29, 2008, as a limited edition DVD, and on March 28, 2008, as a regular edition. Two DVD Players Game versions will be released separately covering the heroines Otome and Nanaka on July 25, 2008, and September 26, 2008.

Da Capo II: To You, released in June 2009, largely consists of prequel stories to the Da Capo II main story, such as Otome's and Yume's younger years, including the times when their mother, Yuki, was still alive, and Mahiru's backstory of when she was still alive. Another fandisc, titled Da Capo II: Fall in Love, was released on December 18, 2009, featuring after stories for the heroines included in the PS2 port and its Plus Communication release. The final Da Capo II release was Da Capo II: Dearest Marriage, which features Yoshiyuki and Otome in their marriage life. An English version of the original visual novel was published by the European company MangaGamer on December 24, 2010.

== Adaptations ==
=== Drama CDs ===
There have been many drama CDs for Da Capo II. The first, titled D.C.II prestorys entrata, was written by Chihare Ameno, the director and one of the main scenario writers from the original game, and was released on February 24, 2006. A second drama CD, called D.C. II: Otome no "Chocolate Box Memories" (D.C.II 音姫の｢Chocolate Box Memories｣), was written by Kōta Takeuchi, another one of the scenario writers for the original game, and was released almost a year later on February 10, 2007. A third drama CD, under the name D.C. II: Setsugekka no "Dokidoki Omimai Daisakusen" (D.C.II 雪月花の｢ドキドキお見舞い大作戦｣), was not released in stores, but instead given out to those who had already signed previously signed up for the Circus fan club in mid 2007. Two more CDs, titled D.C. II: Otome no "Dokidoki! Hatsu (?) Ecchi Daisakusen?" (D.C.II 音姫の｢どきどき! 初(?)エッチ大作戦?｣) and D.C. II: Otome to Yume no "Iku Toshi, Kuru Toshi: Mattari Hen (D.C.II 音姫と由夢の｢行く年、来る年 〜まったり編〜｣) were also released. A CD titled Seiya no Misukon Daisōdō! (聖夜のミスコン大騒動!) was released for the anime's second season on May 21, 2008, by Lantis.

=== Internet radio shows ===
An Internet radio show for Da Capo II called Da Capo II: Kazami Academy Broadcasting Club (〜ダ・カーポ II〜 風見学園放送部, ~Da Kāpo II~ Kazumi Gakuen Hōsōbu). The show, produced by Lantis Web Radio, had a pre-broadcast on March 27, 2006, and officially aired between April 3, 2006, and September 24, 2007. The program aired every Monday at midnight featuring Ai Hinaki, Hijiri Kinomi, and Aya Tachibana who voiced Otome, Yume, and Koko in the original game, respectively. A second Internet radio show began on October 1, 2007, called D.C.toEF Radio produced by Onsen. The show airs every Monday and is hosted by Hinaki, Kinomi, and Tachibana. A third Internet radio show titled Radio Da Capo II: Hatsunejima Nikki (ラジオ ダ・カーポII 〜初音島日記〜) started on November 2, 2007, produced by Animate. The show is aired every Friday and is for the first twenty-seven broadcasts was hosted by Shintarō Asanuma and Yoshino Nanjō who voiced Yoshiyuki and Koko in the anime, but starting with the twenty-sixth broadcast on May 2, 2008, Ayahi Takagaki who voices Otome in the anime joined Asanuma as his co-host.

=== Novels ===
There have been two separate novel series written based on Da Capo II, both published by Paradigm. The first series contained two novels that were written by Circus staff members; the first was released on May 12, 2006, and the second on June 25, 2007. The second series is written by Tasuku Saika and seven volumes were produced between November 24, 2006, and October 11, 2007. Each of the novels covers the story for one of the six heroines, except for the last two volumes which both cover Otome's story.

=== Manga ===
First Da Capo II manga volume 1.

There have been two separate manga series created based on Da Capo II. The first, illustrated by Syo Ryuga, was serialized from December 2006 to October 2009 issues of Kadokawa Shoten's Comptiq magazine. It was collected into five bound volumes published under Kadokawa Shoten's Kadokawa Comics Ace imprint. The second manga series, illustrated by Tsukasa Uhaha, was serialized in ASCII Media Works' Dengeki G's Magazine between the March 2007 and May 2009 issues under the title Da Capo II: Imaginary Future (〜ダ・カーポII イマジナリーフューチャー〜, ~Da Kāpo II Imajinarī Fūchā~). The fifth and final bound volumes will be published for Da Capo II: Imaginary Future under ASCII Media Works' Dengeki Comics imprint on June 27, 2009. A special chapter of Da Capo II: Imaginary Future was serialized in the July 2008 issue of Comptiq sold on June 10, 2008.

=== Anime ===
On May 10, 2007, the magazine Comptiq revealed that a Da Capo II anime adaptation would be produced. The anime aired in Japan between October 1, 2007, and December 24, 2007, on TV Aichi, and was broadcast on other networks soon after, including Chiba TV and TV Kanagawa. A second season aired in Japan between April 5, 2008, and June 28, 2008, on the same networks as the first season. Each season was produced by the animation studio Feel, and contains thirteen episodes.

== Music ==
A CD single containing the main opening and ending themes of Da Capo II was released on June 7, 2006, by Lantis. The main opening theme, "Da Capo II: Asaki Yumemishi Kimi to" (ダ・カーポII 〜あさきゆめみし君と〜), was sung by Yozuca*, and the main ending theme, "Spring has come", was sung by Rino. There were two other opening themes: "Beautiful flower" was sung by Aki Misato, which was also used as an insert song, and "Especially" was sung by Miyuki Hashimoto. Additionally, there were four other ending themes. "Mabushikute Mienai" (まぶしくてみえない) was sung by Yozuca*, which was also used as another insert song, was used as the ending theme for Nanaka's route. "Little Distance" was sung by Seiko Modaka was used as the ending theme for both Anzu's and Koko's route. The third ending theme, "If...I wish", was sung by Aki Misato and was used as the ending theme for Otome's and Yume's routes. The last ending theme, "Aogeba tōtoshi" (仰げば尊し), was sung by twenty of the cast from the game and was used as the ending theme for Minatsu's route. The final theme song used in the game was "Time will shine" sung by Alchemy+, and was used as an insert song.

An album titled VocalAlbum Songs From D.C.II containing the theme songs was released on July 26, 2006, by Lantis. Da Capo II's original soundtrack was released on August 23, 2006 by Lantis. A single containing the theme song for the first Internet radio show titled "Dream on: Koiseyo Otome" (Dream on ~コイセヨオトメ~) was released on October 25, 2006. A character song album featuring songs sung by voice actors from the game was released on December 13, 2006 by Lantis. A maxi single containing the opening theme of Spring Celebration called "Happy my life: Thank you for everything!!" was released on May 9, 2007. A mini album for Spring Celebration containing five of the game's theme songs was released on May 23, 2007 by Lantis. A vocal album for Plus Situation was released by Lantis on June 4, 2008.

For the anime's first season, the opening theme of season one is "Sakura Kimi ni Emu" (サクラキミニエム) sung by Yozuca*, and the ending theme is "Yasashisa wa Ame no Yōni" (優しさは雨のように) by CooRie. Both singles were released on October 24, 2007, by Lantis. The song "Sakura Emi Kimi Omou" (桜笑み君想う) sung by Minori Chihara was used as the ending theme for the thirteenth episode of season one, and the single containing the song was released by Lantis on January 23, 2008. A best of album containing songs from the games and the anime seasons of Da Capo titled Hatsunejima Best: Da Capo Best Selection (初音島ベスト 〜ダ・カーポ〜ベストセレクション) was released by Lantis on November 21, 2007. A vocal album containing songs sung by Yozuca* and CooRie titled Dolce3 was released by Lantis on July 9, 2008. Six image song singles were released for the six main heroines featured in Da Capo II. The first two for Koko and Minatsu were released on December 26, 2007. The next two singles for Nanaka and Anzu were released on February 27, 2008. The final two singles for Yume and Otome were released on April 9, 2008, by Lantis. For the second season, the opening theme is "Sakura Amaneku Sekai" (サクラ アマネク セカイ) sung by Yozuca*, and the ending theme is "Bokutachi no Yukue" (僕たちの行方) sung by CooRie. Both singles were released on April 23, 2008, by Lantis.

== Reception ==
The original Da Capo II release was positively reviewed at visual-novels.net, commenting: "I know a lot of gamers may not enjoy Da Capo, but whilst I think the story on some arcs was weaker than on others they were still amazing paths to play. On the stronger paths you really start to feel a lot of emotion for these girls, and because they're so closely tied together, someone always gets hurt. That for me bought some realism to the game." In the October 2007 issue of Dengeki G's Magazine, poll results for the fifty best bishōjo games were released. Out of 249 titles, Da Capo II ranked seventh with forty-seven votes. Da Capo II was the most widely sold game of 2006 on Getchu.com. Da Capo II: Spring Celebration was the second most widely sold game for the first half of 2007 on Getchu.com, just behind Kimi ga Aruji de Shitsuji ga Ore de. Furthermore, Da Capo II: Spring Celebration was the sixth most widely sold game of 2007 on Getchu.com.
