= Yui Itsuki =

Japanese voice actress

- 伊月 ゆい
- Born: Aichi Prefecture, Japan
- Occupations: Musician, voice actress, VTuber
- Years active: 2003–present
- Agent(s): Holy Peak (2008–2020), Office Restart (2022–present)
- Height: 153 cm (5 ft 0 in)

Yui Itsuki (伊月 ゆい, Itsuki Yui) is a Japanese musician, voice actress and VTuber who is currently signed to Office Restart since April 1, 2022.

== Filmography ==
=== Television animation ===
- Da Capo (2003, as Moe Mizukoshi)
- Futakoi (2004, as Kira Sakurazuki)
- My-HiME (2004, as Miya Suzuki)
- Da Capo Second Season (2005, as Moe Mizukoshi)
- Futakoi Alternative (2005, Kira Sakurazuki)
- Mai-Otome (2005, as Miya Clochette)
- Magical Kanan (2005, as Tomoe Takasaki)
- Renkin 3-kyū Magical? Pokān (2006, as Megumi)
- Venus Versus Virus (2007, as Luca)
- Kanokon (2008, as Mio Osakabe)
- Black Butler (2008, as Paula)
- Black Butler II (2010, as Paula)
- Black Butler: Public School Arc (2024, as Paula)

=== Video games ===
- Arcana Heart series (2008–2014, as Yoriko Yasuzumi)
- True Tears (2006, as Rui Nakane)
- Phantom Brave (as Castile)
- Path to Nowhere (2022, as Pricilla)
