= Dengeki G's Magazine =

Japanese game and manga magazine

- Cover of the last issue (December 2022) featuring Shiki Wakana and Mei Yoneme of Love Live! Superstar!!
- Editor: Kiyoshi Takano
- Categories: Bishōjo games, Seinen manga
- Frequency: Monthly
- Circulation: 120,000 (2009)
- Publisher: MediaWorks (1992–2008); ASCII Media Works (2008–2022)
- First issue: December 26, 1992
- Final issue: October 28, 2022
- Country: Japan
- Based in: Tokyo
- Language: Japanese
- Website: Dengeki G's Magazine

Dengeki G's Magazine (電撃G's magazine) was a Japanese magazine published by ASCII Media Works (formerly MediaWorks) and sold monthly on the thirtieth that primarily contains information on bishōjo games, but also includes an entire section on anime based on bishōjo games, and serializes manga and light novels based on such games. The "G's" in the title stands for "Gals" and "Games". The magazine is known for hosting reader participation games whose outcome is directly influenced by the people who read the magazine; such games include Sister Princess, and Strawberry Panic!. Dengeki G's Magazine first went on sale on December 26, 1992 with the February 1993 issue under the title Dengeki PC Engine, which changed to the current title in 2002. A special edition spin-off version called Dengeki G's Festival! is published in irregular intervals and each issue focuses on a specific bishōjo game. Four other special edition versions under the Festival! name are Dengeki G's Festival! Comic, Dengeki G's Festival! Deluxe, Dengeki G's Festival! Anime, and Dengeki Festival! Heaven. Dengeki G's Magazine's sister magazine is Dengeki Girl's Style, which publishes information on otome games, targeted towards females.

Despite the self-describing "magazine" description, the publication has over 350 pages an issue. About half of the magazine pages are colored and contain information about games or anime; the remaining pages, placed at the end of the magazine, are serialized manga series. Unlike typical Japanese publications, pages are turned from left to right for the first half of the magazine, but this is switched to the traditional right to left configuration when reading the manga series. Dengeki G's Magazine celebrated its fifteenth year of publication in 2007 and its 200th release with the October 2007 issue.

The magazine ceased publication on October 28, 2022 with the December 2022 issue.

== History ==
Dengeki PC Engine final issue — May 1996. Illustration by Tong King Show.

=== Dengeki PC Engine ===
Due to an internal struggle in Kadokawa Shoten near the end of 1992, a group of people split off to create the company MediaWorks on October 15, 1992. The ex-editor of one of Kadokawa's gaming magazines called Marukatsu PC Engine was one of the former employees to go over to MediaWorks, and one of MediaWorks' first magazines published was Dengeki PC Engine (電撃PCエンジン, Dengeki PC Enjin) with the February 1993 issue on December 26, 1992, based on Marukatsu PC Engine. The overall title PC Engine came from the Japanese name for the TurboGrafx-16 video game console first released by NEC in 1987, and the magazine was originally intended to be an information source for the console. However, after NEC Avenue produced a popular dating sim called Sotsugyō: Graduation — which drama CDs, light novels, original video animations, and manga were adapted from — MediaWorks changed the layout of Dengeki PC Engine to have more coverage on adaptations of games the magazine reported on.

A reader-participation game called Megami Stadium had run in Marukatsu PC Engine between the May 1992 and January 1993 issues, so starting with the February 1993 issue of Dengeki PC Engine, MediaWorks created a revival of the game called Megami Paradise which ran in even-numbered issues up until the June 1996 issue. About a year after MediaWorks started Megami Paradise, Marukatsu PC Engine ceased publication on January 30, 1994. That same year in December, the first special edition version of Dengeki PC Engine called Dengeki PlayStation was published. The following year, Dengeki PlayStation broke off to become its own magazine. This was in response to the release of Sony's PlayStation video game console in December 1994.

=== Dengeki G's Engine to present ===
Dengeki G's Engine first issue — June 1996. Illustration by Tong King Show.

Due to the low popularity of NEC's video game console PC-FX, which was the successor to the PC Engine, MediaWorks decided to change the magazine's title from Dengeki PC Engine to Dengeki G's Engine (電撃G'sエンジン, Dengeki G's Enjin), with the June 1996 issue on April 30, 1996, which is also when the magazine stopped being a specific magazine for information on games produced by NEC. Instead, the magazine would now contain information on all bishōjo games as the "G's" in the title stands for both "Gals" and "Games". With the August 1997 issue on June 30, 1997, the magazine's title again changed to Dengeki G's Magazine (電撃G'sマガジン, Dengeki G's Magajiin). The spelling of the title was slightly altered a final time with the May 2002 issue on March 30, 2002 to be Dengeki G's magazine (電撃G's magazine).

After running a string of reader-participation games between 1993 and 1998, Dengeki G's Magazine started Sister Princess in March 1999; this would prove to make the magazine very popular, and became a major focus of the magazine for several years. Nearly all the magazine's covers between 1999 and 2003 featured characters from Sister Princess. After overwhelming support for the project, the series was adapted into a two-series anime, and a string of video games; finally, the serialization of the game ending with the September 2003 issue. At the time, the second TV anime adaptation of another of Dengeki G's Magazine's reader-participation games, Happy Lesson, was just ending, but the series had proved popular. Seeing how popular their reader-participation games could get, MediaWorks continued to create reader-participation games, something the magazine is well known for today. After Sister Princess ended, the editorial department looked to another reader-participation game which started in the October 2002 issue called Futakoi, and the editors wanted to make this game Dengeki G's Magazine's next main focus; the game lasted until October 2005.

On September 30, 2005, with the November 2005 issue, another magazine published by MediaWorks entitled Dengeki AniMaga was merged with Dengeki G's Magazine. This caused a massive influx of anime information, and manga and light novels to be serialized in Dengeki G's Magazine. Following this, G's Magazine started including more information on adult games starting with the November 2005 issue. Between the March 1999 and October 2005 issues, the cover of G's Magazine depicted a girl from one of the reader-participation games running at the time. This was changed from November 2005 onwards where now the cover would depict a heroine from a bishōjo game, which were generally adult games. Between the November 2005 and April 2006 issues, the cover of G's Magazine contained girls from To Heart 2 XRATED and FullAni, two games released by Leaf at the time. This style was similarly adopted for the issues between May 2006 and October 2006 with girls from Da Capo II, and again for the issues between November 2006 and March 2007 with girls from Yoake Mae yori Ruriiro na. This style of deciding on the cover art was dropped with the April 2007 issue. With the October 2007 issue, Dengeki G's Magazine celebrated its 200th consecutive release. Following the release of the May 2014 issue, most of the manga serialized in the magazine were transferred to Dengeki G's Comic.

After 30 years, the magazine ceased publication on October 28, 2022 with the December 2022 issue.

== Features ==
=== Series ===
Manga

Title	Author	Illustrator	Issue run
2/3 Ai no Kyōkaisen	Deden	Shizuka Ogawa (2D world); Shin Kyōgoku (3D world)	January 2006 - March 2007
Angel Beats! Heaven's Door	Jun Maeda	Yuriko Asami	May 2010 - May 2014^{[T]}
Angel Beats! The 4-koma: Bokura no Sensen Kōshinkyoku	Jun Maeda	Haruka Komowata	December 2009 - November 2013
Angel Beats! The 4-koma: Osora no Shinda Sekai kara	Jun Maeda	Haruka Komowata	December 2013 - January 2016
Baby Princess	Sakurako Kimino	Yasuhiro Miyama	May 2011 - August 2013
Baby Princess! 19-nin Shimai no Honobono Days	Sakurako Kimino	Sakura Ikeda	May 2010 - September 2010
Clannad	Key	Shaa	August 2007 - July 2009
Da Capo II: Imaginary Future	Circus	Tsukasa Uhana	March 2007 - May 2009
Da Capo III	Circus	Nonoka Hinata	September 2012 - April 2014
Daitoshokan no Hitsujikai	August	Akane Sasaki	May 2012 - May 2014^{[T]}
Denpa Onna to Seishun Otoko	Hitoma Iruma	Masato Yamane	October 2010 - September 2013
Finalist	PrincessSoft	Shirō Nishiki	November 2005 - February 2006
Fortune Arterial Character's Prelude	August	Akane Sasaki	September 2007 - April 2008
Futakoi	Hina Futaba	Pururu Kinkakuji	November 2004 - October 2005
Gakuen Kino	Keiichi Sigsawa	Dennō Ōwadan	December 2010 - June 2012
Guilty Crown: Dancing Endlaves	Nitroplus	Ryōsuke Fukai	July 2012 - May 2014
Hime Navi & Hime Navi Evolution	Satz	Raina	June 2008 - June 2010
HoneComi The 4-koma	Hooksoft	Yuki Kiriga	April 2007 - March 2008
Horako-san in the Middle of Nowhere	Minoru Kawakami	Karaun Hani	January 2012 - November 2012
Idolising!	Sakaki Hirozawa	Shinnosuke Fujishima	November 2012 - May 2014^{[T]}
Idolising Gaiden: Orin Rising!	Sakaki Hirozawa	Chiruwo Kazahana	January 2013 - May 2014^{[T]}
Koi to Senkyo to Chocolate	Sprite	Tōko Kanno	February 2011 - April 2014
Kud Wafter	Key	Bakutendō	May 2010 - February 2014
Little Busters! End of Refrain	Key	Zen	November 2012 - May 2014^{[T]}
Little Busters! EX The 4-koma	Key	Yūya Sasagiri	June 2010 - May 2014^{[T]}
Little Busters! The 4-koma	Key	Yūya Sasagiri	March 2006 - March 2010
Love Live! School Idol Project	Sakurako Kimino	Arumi Tokita	January 2012 - May 2014^{[T]}
Marriage Royale	Navel	Koko Natsuki	April 2007 - January 2011
My-Otome Saga: Ryū to Otome no Namida	Mizunari Sawajō	Seven Tachibana	April 2007 - September 2007
Nanatsuiro Drops	UNiSONSHIFT	Yūki Takami	November 2006 - May 2008
Ohime-sama Navigation	Satz	Yūki Takami	November 2008 - June 2010
Ore no Imōto ga Konna ni Kawaii Wake ga Nai	Tsukasa Fushimi	Sakura Ikeda	March 2009 - May 2011
Ore no Kōhai ga Konna ni Kawaii Wake ga Nai	Tsukasa Fushimi	Sakura Ikeda	July 2011 - May 2014^{[T]}
Rewrite: Side-B	Key	Sakana Tōjō	October 2010 - May 2014^{[T]}
Ro-Kyu-Bu!	Sagu Aoyama	Yūki Takami	October 2010 - May 2014^{[T]}
Sakura-sō no Pet na Kanojo	Hajime Kamoshida	Hōki Kusano	April 2011 - May 2014^{[T]}
Sword Art Online: Progressive	Reki Kawahara	Kiseki Himura	August 2013 - May 2014^{[T]}
Strawberry Panic!	Sakurako Kimino	Namuchi Takumi	November 2005 - February 2007
The Idolmaster 2: The World Is All One!!	Namco Bandai Games	Yūyū	April 2011 - May 2014
Tsuki wa Higashi ni Hi wa Nishi ni: Operation Sanctuary	August	Mika Takeda	July 2004 - November 2004
Ultra Kaijū Gijinka Keikaku		Bakutendō	July 2014 - July 2019
Utawarerumono	Leaf	Arō Shimakusa	November 2005 - January 2007
Vividred Operation	Team Vivid	Keito Koume	May 2013 - April 2014
Vividred Operation The 4-koma Viviop	Team Vivid	Kotamaru	November 2012 - May 2014
Wind: A Breath of Heart	Minori	Ataru Kajiba	July 2004 - November 2004
Yoake Mae yori Ruriiro na: Moonlight Cradle	August	Hoehoe Nōmiso	February 2009 - May 2009

Light novels

Title	Author	Illustrator	Issue run
_Summer## Official Illust Story	Mujin Kawanami	Makako Matsuhita; Rakko	March 2006 - August 2006
Dream Knocker	Mikage	Sana Wakuzuki	November 2005 - September 2006
Futakoi Alternative G	Ryūnosuke Kingetsu	Ufotable	September 2005 - February 2006
Myself ; Yourself	Takumi Nakazawa	Wadapen	May 2007 - January 2008
Release the Spyce: Golden Genesis			March 2018 - January 2019

=== Reader participation games ===
Dengeki G's Magazine often hosts reader participation games whose outcome is directly influenced by the people who read the magazine. The length of these games vary; some can go on for years, while others end in less than a year. How long a game lasts is decided on how popular the game is among the readers and how many readers participate. At least one game has been running in the magazine since the first issue except during the time between the December 1998 and February 1999 issues when Ojōsama Express ended and Sister Princess began, and again with the November 2005 issue between when Futakoi ended and 2/3 Ai no Kyōkaisen began. Love Live! is the longest-running game, running since July 2010.

Title	Author	Illustrator	Issue run
Megami Paradise	Takeshi Kikuchi	Akihiro Yoshimi & Miyasumi	February 1993 - June 1996 (Published in even-numbered months)
Walzer no Monshō	Shin Araki	Tamayo Kobayashi & Mami Sajima	February 1993 - January 1995 (Published in odd-numbered months)
Hyper Wars	Sadaaki Asu	Tsutomu Hasegawa	December 1993 - October 1994 (Published in even-numbered months)
Route Lancer	Yuri Hayashida	Hanemaro Jūbaori	January 1994 - November 1994 (Published in odd-numbered months)
Seraphim Call	Not applicable	Aoi Nanase	April 1996 - August 1998
Ojōsama Express	Jukki Hanada	Masahide Yanagisawa	December 1997 - November 1998
Sister Princess	Sakurako Kimino	Naoto Tenhiro	March 1999 - September 2003
Happy Lesson	Yoshiki Takano	Mutsumi Sasaki	April 1999 - September 2002
Milky Season	Not applicable	Takuya Io	March 2000 - February 2001
Merry Little Park!	Not applicable	Yū Hisakata	April 2001 - December 2001
Futakoi	Hina Futaba	Mutsumi Sasaki	October 2002 - October 2005
Puppy Girls: Watashi no Ojisama	Sakurako Kimino	Pururu Kinkakuji	March 2003 - October 2003
Strawberry Panic!	Sakurako Kimino	Chitose Maki	November 2003 - September 2005
Ultra Charming!	Maruhi Kano	Harui Ōsaki	December 2003 - August 2004
2/3 Ai no Kyōkaisen	Deden	Shizuka Ogawa (2D world); Shin Kyōgoku (3D world)	December 2005 - December 2007
Marriage Royale	Shingo Hifumi	Aoi Nishimata & Hiro Suzuhira	January 2006 - May 2011
A.I. Love You!	Not applicable	Masato Takashina	February 2006 - November 2009
Ohime-sama Navigation	Satz	Naru Nanao	February 2008 - May 2011
Baby Princess	Sakurako Kimino	Natsuki Mibu	March 2008 - June 2012
Love Live!	Sakurako Kimino	Yūhei Murota	July 2010 - December 2022

== Special editions ==
Dengeki G's Festival! vol. 8

Dengeki PlayStation
Dengeki PlayStation originally began as a special edition of Dengeki G's Magazine and was first published in December 1994. After this issue was released, it was decided that Dengeki PlayStation would become its own magazine.

Dengeki G's Paradise
Dengeki G's Paradise was another special edition issue originally published in 1997. Only one issue was published, and its main feature was the dating sim Sentimental Graffiti.

Dengeki G's Festival!
Dengeki G's Festival! is the third special edition version of Dengeki G's Magazine. The first volume was published in December 2004, and since then, 17 volumes have been published, the latest of which was in July 2010. Dengeki G's Festival is published in irregular intervals that range anywhere between less than a week, to more than six months. The magazine has had a similar style of formatting from the third volume on, and contains about 80 pages an issue on a specific bishōjo game (other than volume two which covered two games). In addition to the main magazine, each issue comes bundled with bonus material depicting characters from the series that is the current feature of a given issue. One of the recurring items is a hug pillowcase featuring an image of one or more bishōjo characters in a sexually suggestive pose.

Dengeki G's Festival! volumes
Volume	Bishōjo game focus	Bonus material	Publish date	Reference
01	To Heart 2	A4 size magnet poster, a deck of playing cards with case, and a 2005 schedule diary	December 16, 2004	
02	Yoake Mae yori Ruriiro na (cover) and Fate/hollow ataraxia	Double-sided head pillowcase featuring Saber and Rin Tōsaka, Yoake Mae yori Ruriiro na jigsaw puzzle, and two cell phone straps featuring Natsuki Takamizawa and Sakura Matō	September 15, 2005	
03	To Heart 2 XRATED	Hug pillowcase, cell phone cleaner, and three mousepads	December 2, 2005	
04	Da Capo II	Hug pillowcase, jigsaw puzzle, and an ID card/pass case	May 19, 2006	
05	Tsuyokiss: Mighty Heart	Alarm clock, double-sided desk pad, and six tin badges	May 25, 2006	
06	Yoake Mae yori Ruriiro na: Brighter than dawning blue	Hug pillowcase, double-sided desk pad, and an ID card/pass case	November 30, 2006	
07	Higurashi no Naku Koro ni Matsuri	Collectible card game, liquid crystal display handheld shooter game, and three drink coasters	February 16, 2007	
08	Shakugan no Shana DS	Hug pillowcase, ID card/pass case, and a cell phone cleaner	March 29, 2007	
09	Little Busters!	Double-sided hug pillowcase, cell phone cleaner, and a B5 size jigsaw puzzle	June 30, 2007	
10	Nanatsuiro Drops Pure!!	Hug pillowcase, jigsaw puzzle, and a cell phone strap	August 30, 2007	
11	Fortune Arterial	Hug pillowcase, special voice CD, and a cell phone cleaner strap	January 19, 2008	
12	Da Capo II: Plus Situation	Bed sheet, mousepad, and a notebook	May 20, 2008	
13	Shin Koihime Musō	Hug pillowcase, mousepad, and a deck of playing cards	December 19, 2008	
14	Oretachi ni Tsubasa wa Nai	Hug pillowcase, ID card/pass case, and a mousepad	January 23, 2009	
15	Yoake Mae yori Ruriiro na: Moonlight Cradle	Hug pillowcase, cell phone cleaner, and a mousepad	February 20, 2009	
16	Marriage Royale	Minato Daiba hug pillowcase, Komachi Akita cell phone cleaner, and a pass case	April 14, 2010	
17	Angel Beats!	Yuri Nakamura hug pillowcase, Angel life-sized wall scroll, and a Girls Dead Monster logo keyholder	July 28, 2010	
18	Love, Election and Chocolate	Chisato hug pillowcase, Michiru microfiber cloth, and Satsuki mouse pad	October 22, 2010	

Dengeki G's Festival! Comic
Dengeki G's Festival! Comic is the second magazine under the Dengeki G's Festival! line. The first volume was published on November 26, 2007 and each volume has about five-hundred pages. The magazine contains manga based on bishōjo games; many of the manga that appear in the magazine were first serialized in Dengeki G's Magazine. In addition to the main magazine, each issue comes bundled with bonus material depicting characters from the manga currently being serialized.

Dengeki G's Festival! Comic volumes
Volume	Cover	Bonus material	Publish date	Reference
01	Clannad	Hug pillowcase featuring Uesugi Kenshin from Sengoku Rance; Mousepad featuring Nagisa Furukawa and Fuko Ibuki from Clannad; Cell phone cleaner featuring Maaryan and Sasara from To Heart 2: Another Days	November 26, 2007	
02	Fortune Arterial	Long towel featuring Erika Sendo from Fortune Arterial; ID card/pass case featuring Shiro Togi from Fortune Arterial; Cell phone cleaner featuring Feena from Yoake Mae yori Ruriiro na	April 26, 2008	
03	Little Busters! Ecstasy	Micro fiber towel featuring Yuiko Kurugaya from Little Busters! Ecstasy; Notepad featuring Saya Tokido from Little Busters! Ecstasy; B2 size poster featuring characters from Clannad	July 26, 2008	
04	Oretachi ni Tsubasa wa Nai	Microfiber towel featuring Hiyoko Tamaizumi from Oretachi ni Tsubasa wa Nai; Cell phone cleaner featuring Kaede Fuyou from Shuffle! Mousepad featuring Miku and Miu from Marriage Royale	October 25, 2008	
05	Yoake Mae yori Ruriiro na: Moonlight Cradle	Microfiber towel featuring Feena Fam Earthlight; ID card/pass case featuring Mia Clementis; Cell phone cleaner featuring Estel Freesia; Each character is from Yoake Mae yori Ruriiro na	January 26, 2009	
06	Da Capo II: To You	Hug pillowcase featuring Otome Asakura from Da Capo II	April 25, 2009	
07	To Heart 2 Portable	Hug pillowcase featuring Tamaki Kōsaka from To Heart 2	July 25, 2009	
08	Sengoku Rance	Figurine featuring Uesugi Kenshin from Sengoku Rance	October 26, 2009	
09	Shin Koihime Musō	Hug pillowcase featuring Ryūbi Gentoku from Shin Koihime Musō	December 26, 2009	
10	Marriage Royale: Prism Story	Hug pillowcase featuring Komachi Akita from Marriage Royale	February 23, 2010	
11	Shin Koihime Musō	Hug pillowcase featuring Sōsō Mōtoku from Shin Koihime Musō	April 26, 2010	
12	Maji de Watashi ni Koishinasai!	Hug pillowcase featuring Momoyo Kawakami from Maji de Watashi ni Koishinasai!	June 26, 2010	

Dengeki G's Festival! Deluxe
Dengeki G's Festival! Deluxe is the third magazine under the Dengeki G's Festival! line. The first volume was published on November 30, 2007 and each volume has about eighty pages. In contrast to Dengeki G's Festival! which only covers the visual novel aspect of a given bishōjo game, Deluxe offers information on adaptations in addition to information on the original game. As with the previous two Festival! magazines, each issue of Deluxe comes bundled with bonus material depicting characters from the series that is the current feature of a given issue.

Dengeki G's Festival! Deluxe volumes
Volume	Cover	Bonus material	Publish date	Reference
01	Ef: A Fairy Tale of the Two.	Mousepad, cell phone cleaner, and an ID card/pass case	November 30, 2007	
02	To Heart 2: Another Days	Hug pillowcase, mousepad, and a cell phone cleaner	February 21, 2008	
03	Little Busters! Ecstasy	Mousepad, jigsaw puzzle, and a deck of playing cards	June 30, 2008	
04	To Heart 2 Portable	1/10 scale figurine, and stick posters	July 23, 2009	
05	Rewrite	Hug pillowcase, keychain, and a deck of playing cards	December 26, 2009	
06	Angel Beats!	Hug pillowcase and a super deformed figurine	March 29, 2010	
07	Kud Wafter	1/10 scale Kudryavka Noumi figurine	June 19, 2010	
08	Shin Koihime Musō	3D mousepad, folding fan, and a microfiber mini towel	July 16, 2010	

Dengeki G's Festival! Anime
Dengeki G's Festival! Anime is the fourth magazine under the Dengeki G's Festival! line. The first volume was published on February 9, 2008. Each issue has a large focus on a single anime series, though there is information on other series adapted from manga or light novels originally published by ASCII Media Works. As with the previous three Festival! magazines, each issue of Anime comes bundled with bonus material depicting characters from the series that is the current feature of a given issue.

Dengeki G's Festival! Anime volumes
Volume	Anime focus	Bonus material	Publish date	Reference
01	Shakugan no Shana II	Two figurines (of Shana and Konoe Fumina), and a deck of playing cards with art from the light novel and anime versions	February 9, 2008	
02	Nogizaka Haruka no Himitsu (cover), Toaru Majutsu no Index, and Toradora!	Mousepad featuring Haruka Nogizaka, two buttons featuring Taiga Aisaka and Index, and a set of decal stickers with characters from the three featured anime	September 25, 2008	
03	Toaru Kagaku no Railgun (cover), Nogizaka Haruka no Himitsu: Purezza, Asura Cryin' 2, and Spice and Wolf II	Hug pillowcase featuring Haruka Nogizaka	September 29, 2009	

Dengeki Festival! Heaven
Dengeki Festival! Heaven is another special edition version of Dengeki G's Magazine. The first volume was published on July 9, 2008. The magazine contains manga based on otome games and is targeted towards females. In addition to the main magazine, each issue comes bundled with bonus material depicting characters from the manga currently being serialized.

Dengeki Festival! Heaven volumes
Volume	Cover	Bonus material	Publish date	Reference
01	Hakuōki	Towel, drama CD, and a B4 size poster	July 9, 2008	

== Notes and references ==
^{T} These manga were transferred to Dengeki G's Comic.
