= Natsuki Tanihara =

Japanese manga artist

Natsuki Tanihara (たにはら なつき, August 18, Year Unknown) is a Japanese manga artist, but is better known as character designer of visual novels. She is the artist for the media franchise Tantei Opera Milky Holmes, and is often considered the artistic successor to Naru Nanao for the Da Capo franchise.

== Works ==
=== Visual Novels ===
- D.C. ~Da Capo~ Series
- Home Maid
- Eternal Fantasy
- Renge
- Canvas3
- Prism Rhythm
- Prism ☆ Magical ~Prism Generations!~
- Sora Tobu Hitsuji to Manatsu no Hana
- Hana Hime * Absolute!
- Starlight Idol -COLORFUL TOP STAGE-

=== Light Novels and Manga ===
- Chouki Tensei: Bishounen ni Natte Koukyuu Sennyuu!?
- Imouto Jakigan!
- Utau Shoujo no Full Score
- Yandere Kanojo ga Ippai Sugiru! Seitokaichou, Osananajimi, Gimai, Gibo
- Momone Shion no Ranobe Nikki
- Oneechan Sensei ga Ryouri Shite Ageru
- D.C.S.G.: Da Capo - Second Graduation
