= Naru Nanao =

Japanese artist

- Born: Okinawa, Japan
- Known for: Bishōjo games, Visual novels
- Notable work: D.C.: Da Capo; Ef: A Fairy Tale of the Two

Naru Nanao (七尾 奈留, Nanao Naru) is the pseudonym of a Japanese artist from Okinawa, Japan. Nanao's choice of her pseudonym stems from Circus' game Aries, in which one of the characters was named Runa Nanao (七尾 留奈, Nanao Runa). She is a free illustrator and thus is not affiliated with one single company; she is primarily a character designer. She began working with video game developers in 2000, but she is most well known for providing original character design for three heroines in the original D.C.: Da Capo visual novel by Circus released in 2002. Other works include Canvas 2: Niji Iro no Sketch, Ef: A Fairy Tale of the Two, and Sola. At one point, she only went by her given name Naru. She is the supervisor of her dōjinshi circle known as "Ice and Chocolate" (あいすとちょこ, Aisu to Choko). She often collaborates with another circle named "Poteneko" (ぽてねこ). She even provided the front-cover illustration for the Comiket 70 catalog for August 2006.

== Career ==
=== Visual novels ===
Naru Nanao has worked on numerous adult visual novels due to her status as a free illustrator and not being affiliated with one single company; she is primarily a character designer. Her first work for a visual novel was as the art director for Cave Castle Cavalier by Dall released in 2000. That same year, she worked on Kinki 2 -Taboo-: Hospital Taboo by Succubus. In 2001, Nanao worked on three games for the company Circus which were: Infanteria, Suika, and Archimedes no Wasuremono. Also in 2001, Nanao worked on her first all-ages game called Quiz Saitama Rengō no Yabō by Saitama Ringō. In 2002, Nanao provided character design in Circus' first D.C.: Da Capo game for three heroines: Nemu Asakura, Sakura Yoshino, and Kotori Shirakawa. Even though Nanao became well known for her work in D.C.: Da Capo, she did not participate in another game in the Da Capo series again. Also in 2002, Nanao worked on the game Panic!! Kerokero Ōkoku by Pajama Soft. In 2003, Nanao worked with Circus and PrincessSoft to produce the all-ages game Sakura: Setsugekka. In 2004, Nanao designed two heroines, Elis Hōsen and Kiri Kikyō, from Canvas 2: Niji Iro no Sketch by F&C FC01. In 2006, Nanao started working with Minori on their game series Ef: A Fairy Tale of the Two by providing female character design. In 2011, she worked on Canvas 4: Achrome Étude by providing Elis Hōsen's character design.

=== Other ===
In 2006, Nanao teamed up with Naoki Hisaya (main writer of Kanon) to produce the original series Sola. Nanao provided the original character design for the project which was used as a template for the character design in the Sola anime and manga series. In 2007, Nanao started working as the character designer on the reader-participation game Ohime-sama Navigation being serialized in the Japanese bishōjo magazine Dengeki G's Magazine, published by ASCII Media Works. She worked with Tryfirst as the character designer on the Nintendo DS visual novel Majo ni Naru (魔女になる。), released in Japan in 2009. It was translated into English and released in 2010 by Natsume Inc., under the title Witch's Wish.

== Art style ==
Before becoming well known with D.C.: Da Capo, her style of character art at that time was often compared to Misato Mitsumi, another artist known for her work on Comic Party. The similarities between the two artists was often brought up on the Japanese Internet forum 2channel. Her characters have large, wide eyes with a certain amount of sharpness, as opposed to being more rounded, which are widely spaced apart on the face. A distinct feature often added to her bishōjo characters is the use of long, thin ribbons attached to the hair or clothing. Clothing, especially Japanese school uniforms, is often simple in design but very diverse, such as in regard to collars, sleeves, or skirt hems. While excelling in female character design, her design for males lacks, which is why when working on a visual novel, character design for the males will be handled by a different person, such as in the case of Ef: A Fairy Tale of the Two, which had male character design provided by 2C Galore.
