= Kanao Araki =

Japanese manga artist

- Born: February 24
- Occupation: manga artist

Kanao Araki (あらきかなお, Araki Kanao; born on February 24) is a female Japanese manga artist.

== Works ==
- Futakoi Alternative
- Mahō no Jyumon
- Otome wa Boku ni Koishiteru
