= Da Capo (video game) =

Japanese adult visual novel

- Da Capo original visual novel cover

〜ダ・カーポ〜 (Da Kāpo)
- Genre: Harem, romantic comedy
- Video game
- Developer: Circus (Circus Northern)
- Publisher: Circus (Windows); Kadokawa Shoten (PS2 Plus Situation, PS2 Four Seasons, PSP I & II Plus Situation Portable); Sweets (PS2 The Origin, PS2 Innocent Finale); Idea Factory (PSP Girl's Symphony Pocket); Bushiroad (Re:tune): EU: MangaGamer (Windows)
- Genre: Eroge, visual novel
- Platform: Windows, PlayStation 2, PlayStation Portable
- Released: June 28, 2002 (CD)
- Manga
- Written by: Circus
- Illustrated by: Natsuki Tanihara
- Published by: Kadokawa Shoten
- Magazine: Comptiq
- Original run: February 10, 2003 – April 10, 2004
- Volumes: 2
- Anime television series
- Directed by: Nagisa Miyazaki (season 1); Munenori Nawa (season 2)
- Written by: Mamiko Ikeda (season 1); Katsumi Hasegawa (season 2)
- Music by: Hikaru Nanase; Yugo Kanno (season 1)
- Studio: Zexcs (season 1); Feel (season 2)
- Original network: Chiba TV, KBS Kyoto, Kids Station, Sun TV, TV Aichi, TV Kanagawa, TV Saitama
- Original run: July 11, 2003 – December 24, 2005
- Episodes: 52
- Manga

Da Capo: Second Graduation
- Written by: Circus
- Illustrated by: Cherish
- Published by: Kadokawa Shoten
- Magazine: Comptiq
- Original run: August 10, 2004 – July 10, 2006
- Volumes: 3
- Original video animation

Da Capo: If
- Directed by: Kenichiro Komaya
- Written by: Masashi Suzuki
- Studio: Zexcs
- Released: December 25, 2008 – March 25, 2009
- Runtime: 24 minutes each
- Episodes: 2
- Game sequels
- Da Capo II; Da Capo III; Da Capo 4

Da Capo (〜ダ・カーポ〜, Da Kāpo; commonly abbreviated as D.C.) is a Japanese adult visual novel developed by Circus's division Circus Northern which was released as a limited edition on June 28, 2002, playable on Windows as a CD-ROM; a DVD-ROM version followed on July 26, 2002. An English release was scheduled for December 25, 2008, and the game was available for a brief time on that date, but the title was pulled until January 20, 2009. Da Capo began as a series of prelude short scenarios in the Suika fandisc Archimedes no Wasuremono, and since the initial release, there have been numerous different versions released for Windows and PlayStation 2 over the years with updated scenarios and characters. The gameplay in Da Capo follows a plot line which offers pre-determined scenarios with courses of interaction, and focuses on the appeal of the seven female main characters.

Circus described Da Capo as a "ticklish school romance adventure" (こそばゆい学園恋愛アドベンチャー, kosobayui gakuen renai adobenchā). A sequel set 53 years after the end of Da Capo, Da Capo II, was released on May 26, 2006, and features a new cast of characters living two generations after the original. Da Capo is set on a fictional island in modern Japan, Hatsunejima (初音島), where the sakura trees are always in full blossom. Da capo is an Italian musical term meaning "from the beginning", and the game was such named with parts of the storyline looping before approaching the true end.

There have been numerous adaptations into other media. Two manga series were serialized between 2003 and 2006 in Kadokawa Shoten's Comptiq magazine illustrated by different manga artists. Two anime series, produced by different animation studios and directed by different directors, were produced in 2003 and 2005, each containing 26 episodes. Two radio shows, five novel adaptations, four drama CD adaptations, and an original video animation series have also been produced.

A full remake called D.C. Re:tune was released on October 30, 2025, on Steam and Nintendo Switch published by Bushiroad, available in Japanese, English, and Chinese.

== Gameplay ==
Da Capo's gameplay requires little interaction from the player, as it is a classic visual novel: most of the duration of the game is spent simply reading the text that appears on the screen which represents either dialogue between the various characters or the inner thoughts of the protagonist. Every so often, the player will come to a point where he or she is given the chance to choose from multiple locations to spend time at. The time between these points is variable and can occur anywhere from a minute to much longer. Gameplay pauses at these points and depending on which choice the player makes, the plot will progress in a specific direction. There are seven main plot lines that the player will have the chance to experience, one for each of the heroines in the story. To view all seven plot lines, the player will have to replay the game multiple times and make different decisions to progress the plot in an alternate direction. Throughout gameplay, the player enables the viewing of sex scenes depicting the protagonist, Jun'ichi, and one of the seven heroines having sex.

== Plot ==
Da Capo centers around Jun'ichi Asakura, who lives with his adopted sister Nemu on Hatsune, a fictional crescent-shaped island where cherry blossoms bloom all year long, where they attend Kazami Academy (風見学園, Kazami Gakuen) high school. On this island, people have mysterious powers and attributes, sourced by the unwilting magical cherry tree. Jun'ichi can see other people's dreams. One of his friends, Kotori Shirakawa, is an idol at the school who can "read minds". One day, to Jun'ichi's surprise, his cousin Sakura Yoshino comes back from America all of a sudden, who looks exactly the same girl that moved away six years ago, and has not aged one bit. She returned to remind Jun'ichi of their childhood promise.

== Development ==
Da Capo was Circus's sixth game, but was the fourth game developed by the development group Circus Northern who had also produced their second title Suika. The game's production was headed by Tororo, president of Circus, who also worked on the game's music, and was directed by Mikage and Hotaru Koizumi. The scenario in the game was divided between four people who worked on the different stories for the heroines. Mikage wrote Nemu's and Sakura's scenarios; Kure (short for Soratobuenban ni Kure ga Notta yo) wrote Kotori's and Yoriko's scenarios; Yoko Yoko wrote Moe's and Mako's scenarios; and Mari wrote Miharu's scenario. Character design and art direction was divided between three people. Naru Nanao designed Nemu, Sakura, and Kotori; Igul designed Miharu, Moe, Mako, and others; and Kanon Ikutata designed the chibi characters, and others. The opening video was produced by Nitroplus.

=== Release history ===
Da Capo was first released in Japan as an adult game for Windows on June 28, 2002, as a CD-ROM in limited and regular editions. A version as a DVD-ROM followed on July 26, 2002, in limited and regular editions, and a package containing both CD- and DVD-ROM versions was released on September 26, 2003. A version of the original game was ported to the PlayStation 2 titled Da Capo: The Origin (〜ダ・カーポ〜 ジ オリジン〜) on February 14, 2008. A limited and regular edition of an extended version with updated storylines and characters, but with the adult content removed, was released on the PlayStation 2 on October 30, 2003, titled Da Capo: Plus Situation (〜ダ・カーポ プラスシチュエーション〜). A "best" version was released of D.C.P.S. on July 14, 2005. Circus released an adult version of D.C.P.S. on May 28, 2004, named Da Capo: Plus Communication (〜ダ・カーポ〜 プラスコミュニケーション) as a limited edition playable as a CD- and DVD-ROM for Windows. The regular edition of the game followed on June 4, 2004. This game was again re-released on December 16, 2005, as a "gratitude pack", and again on June 29, 2007, updated for Windows Vista.

A fandisc titled Da Capo: White Season (〜ダ・カーポ ホワイトシーズン〜) was released for Windows on December 13, 2002, as a Christmas limited edition; the regular edition followed on January 24, 2003, in CD- and DVD-ROM editions. A renewal package edition of White Season playable as a DVD was released on February 25, 2005. Another fandisc followed for Windows on August 27, 2004, as a limited edition titled Da Capo: Summer Vacation (〜ダ・カーポ サマーバケーション〜). The regular edition of Summer Vacation followed on September 3, 2004, and a CD-ROM version was released on August 5, 2005. Another version for the PlayStation 2 was released on December 15, 2005, in limited and regular editions called Da Capo: Four Seasons (〜ダ・カーポ〜 フォーシーズンズ). A Windows version of Four Seasons was released by Circus on June 27, 2008, with added adult content called Da Capo: After Seasons (〜ダ・カーポ〜 アフターシーズンズ).

An adult fandisc titled Circus Disc: Christmas Days (〜サーカスディスク クリスマスデイズ〜) was released by Circus for Windows as a limited edition DVD on December 22, 2006, and as a regular edition on January 1, 2007. Three DVD Players Game versions were released in limited and regular editions separately covering the heroines Nemu, Sakura, and Kotori; the games were released between June 1, 2007, and September 28, 2007. An adult spin-off title called Da Capo Poker (〜ダ・カーポーカー〜) was released by Circus on February 29, 2008, as a limited edition DVD, and on March 28, 2008, as a regular edition. A sequel to Christmas Days for Windows titled C.D.C.D.2 (〜シーディーシーディー2〜) was released on July 25, 2008, and an otome game spin-off for Windows titled Da Capo: Girls Symphony (〜ダ・カーポ〜 ガールズ シンフォニー) was released on September 26, 2008, followed by the PSP version for 2010. An English adult version of the original visual novel available for download online by European-based company MangaGamer was released on January 23, 2009.

== Adaptations ==
=== Novels ===
Many novels have been written based on Da Capo and its updated versions. The first series of novels based on the original Da Capo game was a series of six novels written by Tasuku Saika between December 2002 and February 2004. Saika also wrote a series of six novels between October 2004 and May 2005 based on Plus Communication. Four more novels based on Plus Communication were written by Izumi Okazaki, illustrated by Mikeō, and were published by Enterbrain between February 2005 and September 30, 2006. Two novels based on the manga adaptation Second Graduation were written by Miyuki Gotō and released in October 2005 and January 2006. A single novel based on Four Seasons and written by Circus, Chiruda Sasamiya, and Masashi Suzuki with illustrations by Cherish was published on March 25, 2006.

=== Drama CDs ===
Many drama CDs have been produced based on the original Da Capo visual novel and the anime adaptations. The first drama CD was released for the visual novel by Lantis on January 22, 2003, titled Shunshoku no Shima (春色の島). A drama CD titled Nemu Hajime (音夢はじめ) was released by Circus for the visual novel as a limited edition, and was not widely distributed. For the first anime season, six drama CDs with each covering a single heroine except for the sixth volume which covers two heroines; the CDs were released between July 22, 2004, and April 26, 2005. Three more drama CDs were released for the second anime season between January 25, 2006, and June 7, 2006.

=== Manga ===
There have been two manga adaptations of Da Capo. The first Da Capo manga was illustrated by Natsuki Tanihara and was serialized in Kadokawa Shoten's Comptiq magazine between February 10, 2003, and April 10, 2004. Two bound volumes were released for the first manga. The second manga, titled Da Capo: Second Graduation, was illustrated by Cherish and was serialized in Comptiq between August 10, 2004, and July 10, 2006. Three volumes were released for the second manga. Many manga anthologies have also been produced over the years.

=== Anime ===
There have been two anime series and one original video animation based on Da Capo. The first anime series was produced by the Japanese animation studio Zexcs and directed by Nagisa Miyazaki. It aired in Japan between July 11, 2003, to December 27, 2003, and spanned 26 episodes. The first seven episodes of the series aired with image songs performed by the Japanese voice actresses who voiced main female characters, while episodes eight through 14 and 16 through 21 were aired with side episodes, with episode 22 onwards aired in full-length, lasting about 24 minutes. The second anime series, Da Capo: Second Season, was produced by Feel and directed by Munenori Nawa. The series also spanned 26 episodes and aired in Japan between July 2, 2005, to December 24, 2005. A two-episode OVA series titled Da Capo: If, produced by Zexcs and featuring Kotori Shirakawa as the main character was released with two DVD box-sets containing the first and second anime series. The first DVD box-set, containing the first anime series and the first OVA episode was released on December 25, 2008. The second DVD box-set, containing the second anime series and the second OVA episode was released on March 25, 2009.

The first anime series had four pieces of theme music, one opening theme and three ending themes. The opening theme is "Sakura Saku Mirai Koi Yume" (サクラサクミライコイユメ; lit, "Love Dream of the Future Where the Sakura Bloom") sung by Yozuca*, although was used as the ending theme for the first, and last episodes. The first ending theme is "Mirai e no Melody" (未来へのMelody; lit. "Melody to the Future") by CooRie which was used in episodes two through seven, nine through 14, and 16 through 20. The second ending theme is "Utamaru Ekaki Uta" (うたまるえかき唄; lit. "Utamaru Drawing Song") by Haruko Momoi which was used in episodes eight and 15. The third ending theme is "Sonzai" (存在; lit. "Existence") by CooRie and was used in episodes 21 through 25, though was also used as the opening theme for the final episode.

The second anime series had three pieces of theme music, one opening theme and two ending themes. The opening theme is "Sakurairo no Kisetsu" (サクライロノキセツ; lit. "The Cherry Blossom-colored Season") by Yozuca*, though the first episode's version does not use vocals. The first ending theme is "Akatsuki ni Saku Uta" (暁に咲く詩; lit. "The Verse Blooming in Dawn") by CooRie and was used in episodes one through 23, and in the final episode. The second ending theme is "Kioku Love Letter" (記憶ラブレター; lit. "Remembrance Love Letter") by CooRie which was used in episodes 24 and 25.

=== Radio shows ===
Two radios shows have been produced for the anime adaptations of Da Capo. The first show named Da Capo: Hatsunejima Hōsōgyoku (〜ダ・カーポ〜 初音島放送局) aired between October 4, 2003, and June 25, 2005, on Radio Osaka and TBS Radio in Japan every Sunday late at night. The first radio show served to promote the first anime season and contained 91 broadcasts. Four CDs were released containing some of the broadcasts from the first radio show were released by Lantis between March 3, 2004, and June 22, 2005. The second show titled Hatsunejima Hōsōgyoku S.S. (初音島放送局S.S), this time streamed online, aired every Friday between July 8, 2005, and June 2, 2006, and was distributed by Lantis and Animate. The second radio show served to promote the second anime season and contained 47 broadcasts. Three CDs were released containing most of the broadcasts from the second radio show were released by Lantis between October 5, 2005, and May 24, 2005.

== Music ==
The original visual novel of Da Capo has four pieces of theme music, one opening theme, two ending themes, and one insert song. The opening theme is "Da Capo: Dai 2 Button no Chikai" (ダ・カーポ 〜第2ボタンの誓い〜) which is written and composed by Tororo and sung by Yozuca*. The first ending theme is "Dream: The ally of" written by Tororo, composed by Naoyuki Nagata, and sung by Rino. The second ending theme is "Dream: The other side" written by Tororo, composed by Takayuki Azuma, and sung by Noriko Mitose. A single containing the opening and ending themes was released by Lantis on August 22, 2002. The insert song is "Small Cherry: promised bell" written by Tororo, composed by Angel Note, and sung by Mami Nakayama from Angel Note.

The Da Capo Complete Original Soundtrack was released by Lantis on September 25, 2002, containing two discs with 33 tracks. An image song album for Da Capo titled Songs from Da Capo was released by Lantis on November 22, 2002, which also included some drama tracks. Two image song albums were released for Plus Situation on April 7 and July 7, 2004, titled D.C.P.S.C.S.1 and D.C.P.S.C.S.2, respectively. A vocal mini album for Four Seasons was released by Lantis on February 8, 2006.

The single containing the first anime season's opening and ending themes titled "Sakura Saku Mirai Koi Yume" (サクラサクミライコイユメ) was released by Lantis on July 24, 2003. Three image song albums were released by Lantis for the first anime season, each with two or three characters per album. The first volume, for Nemu and Yoriko, contained songs sung by Sakura Nogawa and Miyu Matsuki, and was released on August 27, 2003. The second image song album, for Sakura, Moe and Mako, contained songs sung by Yukari Tamura, Yui Itsuki and Yuki Matsuoka, and was released on September 26, 2003. The third image song album, for Kotori and Miharu, contained songs sung by Yui Horie and Akemi Kanda, and was released on October 22, 2003. A vocal album containing songs sung by Yozuca* and Rino titled Dolce was released by Lantis on December 26, 2003. Three more volumes of vocal albums were released by Lantis, each covering one character. The first named Ribbons&Candies for Nemu contained songs sung by Sakura Nogawa and was released on September 1, 2004. The second album named My Little Wish for Sakura contained songs sung by Yukari Tamura and was released on December 1, 2004. The third album titled Happy Days for Yoriko contained songs sung by Miyu Matsuki and was released on July 6, 2005. A best of album containing songs from the games and the anime seasons of Da Capo titled Hatsunejima Best Da Capo Best Selection (初音島ベスト D.C.〜ダ・カーポ〜ベストセレクション) was released by Lantis on November 21, 2007. Two original soundtracks were released for the first anime season, the first titled Amoroso and the second named Brillante which were released by Lantis on November 27, 2003, and March 24, 2004, respectively.

The single containing the second anime season's opening theme titled "Sakurairo no Kisetsu" (サクライロノキセツ) was released by Lantis on July 21, 2005. The single containing the second anime season's ending theme titled "Akatsuki ni Saku Uta" (暁に咲く詩) was released by Lantis on August 24, 2005. An image song single for the character Aisia was released by Lantis on September 7, 2005. Two volumes of vocal albums were released by Lantis on October 26, 2005, and May 10, 2006, containing songs sung by voice actresses from the anime. A follow-up of the previously released Dolce album titled Dolce2 was released on December 21, 2005. Two original soundtracks were released for the second anime season which were released by Lantis on November 23, 2005, and January 25, 2006, respectively.

== Reception ==
According to a national ranking of how well bishōjo games sold nationally in Japan, the original Da Capo release for Windows achieved its highest rank at number one in the ranking. In the October 2007 issue of Dengeki G's Magazine, poll results for the 50 best bishōjo games were released. Out of 249 titles, Da Capo ranked sixth with 61 votes.

On reviewing the English version of the visual novel, Daniel Joseph of NookGaming described Da Capo as "average" after summing up the good and bad points. The music was noted as particularly strong, while the writing was mentioned as a weak point, citing issues such as the dialogue being "full of non-sequiturs and unnatural conversation".
