= Suika (2001 video game) =

Japanese visual novel

- Suika original visual novel cover

水夏
- Genre: Romance
- Video game
- Developer: Circus Northern
- Publisher: JP: Circus (Windows) PrincessSoft (PlayStation, Dreamcast) S.O.F.T. (All-ages version) Sweets (PlayStation 2); WW: MangaGamer (Windows)
- Genre: Eroge, visual novel
- Platform: Windows, PlayStation, Dreamcast, PlayStation 2
- Released: July 27, 2001 (CD-ROM)
- Light novel
- Written by: Tasuku Saika
- Illustrated by: Naru Nanao; Takanon Ikuta
- Published by: Paradigm
- Published: November 2001
- Original video animation

Wet Summer Days
- Directed by: Yasuhito Kikuchi
- Written by: Mitsuhiro Yamada
- Studio: Moon Rock
- Licensed by: Kitty Media
- Released: February 25, 2003 – April 25, 2004
- Runtime: 30 minutes each
- Episodes: 4

Suika (水夏) is a Japanese adult visual novel developed by Circus and was first released on July 27, 2001 for Windows as a CD-ROM, followed by a DVD-ROM release on August 31, 2001. It was followed by two all-ages consumer ports for the PlayStation, retitled as Water Summer, and the Dreamcast on July 18, 2002, which was subsequently followed by an all-ages version for Windows, released on July 25, 2003. An expanded version, entitled Suika A.S+ (水夏A.S+), was released in Japan on September 24, 2004 with the adult content found in the original version, followed by a European release on April 25, 2009, and was again ported to the PlayStation 2, entitled Suika A.S+ Eternal Name (水夏A.S+ Eternal Name), released on August 30, 2007 with the adult content removed. The gameplay in Suika follows a linear plot line, which offers pre-determined scenarios and courses of interaction, and focuses on the appeal of the main female characters.

Suika has made several transitions to other media. A light novel was published by Paradigm in November 2001 and a set of four drama CDs were produced between August 2002 and January 2003. A four-episode adult original video animation created by Moon Rock was released between February 25, 2003 and June 25, 2003 as three DVDs containing one episode each, followed by a DVD box-set released on April 25, 2004 containing an extra episode, and was subsequently licensed for sale in North America under the title Wet Summer Days by Kitty Media.

== Gameplay ==
The Suika visual novel is divided into four chapters which contain different stories and characters, though all take place in the same rural town known as Tokiwa Village. In a short prologue upon starting a new game, the player assumes the role of Hiroshi Inaba as he arrives back in town for his annual visit of friends and family. It is here that the two heroines for the two upcoming chapters are seen through his eyes. In the first chapter, the player assumes the role of Akira Kazama and centers around his interaction with the first chapter's sole main heroine Itsuki Minase (voiced by Minami Nagasaki). In the second chapter, the protagonist is Souji Kamishiro who interacts with the second chapter's two main heroines Sayaka Shirakawa (voiced by Kanon Torii) and Mie Wakabayashi (voiced by Junko Kusayanagi). In the third chapter, the player plays as Yoshikazu Masaki who interacts with two heroines, Akane Masaki (voiced by Yura Hinata) and Touko Kyouya (voiced by Komugi Nishida). In the fourth and final chapter, the player returns to Hiroshi Inaba. This chapter centers around his interaction with a heroine who remains nameless throughout the story (voiced by Hiyori Haruno in Original and Azumi Nakatani in A.S.).

Suika's gameplay requires little interaction from the player as most of the game's duration is spent reading the text that appears on the game screen, which represents either dialogue between the various characters or the inner thoughts of the protagonist. After progressing through the text, the player will come to a "decision point" where he or she must choose from multiple options. The time between these decision points varies. Gameplay pauses at these points and depending on which choice the player makes, the plot will progress in a specific direction. There are five main plot lines the player experiences—one for each heroine. The player must replay the game multiple times and make different choices during decision points to view all five plot lines. One of the goals of the original version's gameplay is for the player to enable the viewing of hentai scenes depicting the given protagonist and one of the heroines having sex.

== Development ==
Suika is the fourth project developed by the visual novel studio Circus, and the second by their Northern subdivision. The producer for Suika was Tororo, president of Circus, who was also one of the two music composers, the other being Kometto Nekono. The planning for Suika was headed by Mikage, and was one of the two scenario writers along with Ichirō Go. Art direction and character design was split between Naru Nanao and Takanon Ikuta. Programming for the game was provided by Takanori. Tororo, Mikage, and Naru Nanao went on to create titles such as Da Capo, with the latter two later collaborating to help develop Minori's Ef: A Fairy Tale of the Two.

=== Release history ===
Suika was first available to be public on July 27, 2001, as a CD-ROM for Windows, containing adult content. It was followed by a DVD-ROM release, with various technical improvements, on August 31, 2001. Both versions were released as both a limited edition and a regular edition. The limited edition contained an arrange soundtrack album, a calendar, in addition to a T-shirt included in only the DVD-ROM release; the regular editions did not contain the aforementioned extras.

The next year, the original releases of Suika were followed by two consumer console ports for the PlayStation, renamed as Water Summer, and the Dreamcast. Both versions were published by PrincessSoft, and were released on July 18, 2002 as both a limited edition and a regular edition, with the adult content found in the original release removed. The limited edition of both the PS and the DC version were limited in quantity, with fifteen-thousand units manufactured for the PS version, and twenty-thousand for the DC version. It was subsequently followed by an all-ages version published by S.O.F.T., released on July 25, 2003 for Windows. An enhanced re-release based on the all-ages version, entitled Suika A.S+ (水夏A.S+), was published by Circus in Japan on September 24, 2004 with extended scenario and the adult content found in the original version. The game was ported to the PlayStation 2 in limited and regular editions on August 30, 2007 under the title Suika A.S+ Eternal Name (水夏A.S+ Eternal Name) with adult content once again removed. The game was released downloadable on the Internet in English published by the European-based company MangaGamer on April 25, 2009.

== Related media ==
=== Books ===
The Suika Official Visual Fan Book (水夏公式ビジュアルファンブック, Suika Kōshiki Bijuaru Fan Bukku) was published by SoftBank Publishing in October 2001. A light novel written by Tasuku Saika with illustrations by Takanon Ikuta and cover illustration by Naru Nanao was published by Paradigm in November 2001 and covered the story from the fourth chapter in Suika. A guide book entitled Suika & Water Summer: Natsu no Omoide Guide (水夏&WATER SUMMER 夏の想い出ガイド) was published by SoftBank Publishing in September 2002.

=== OVA ===
An adult-oriented original video animation series was produced by the animation studio Moon Rock, executively produced by Toshio Maeda, and directed by Yasuhito Kikuchi. The studio adapted Suika initially over three episodes which were released on three separate DVDs and VHSs between February 25, 2003 and June 25, 2003 in Japan. A DVD box-set containing the first three volumes and an extra episode was released in Japan on April 25, 2004. The OVA series was licensed and released subtitled in English by Kitty Media as a single DVD containing the four episodes on August 17, 2004.

=== Music and audio CDs ===
The original visual novel and the ports to the PlayStation and Dreamcast each have two pieces of theme music, one opening theme and one ending theme. The opening theme is "Fragment: The Heat Haze of Summer" sung by Kamin in the original Windows version, and by Yozuca* in the two ports. A maxi single containing the opening theme sung by Kamin was released by Circus on July 15, 2001. The ending theme is "Fragment: Thought to Wish to the Starlit Sky" sung by Miwa Kōzuki in the Windows version, and by Rino for the ports. Both songs were written and composed by Tororo. The Water Summer Original Soundtrack, the soundtrack for the PlayStation and Dreamcast versions, was released by Circus on August 11, 2001. A remix album entitled Suika: Perfect Arrange Album (水夏~SUIKA~パーフェクトアレンジアルバム) was released by First Smile Entertainment on December 19, 2001. The Suika Original Soundtrack for the original visual novel was released by PetaBits Records on October 26, 2007.

The updated release of Suika entitled Suika A.S+ has three pieces of theme music, one opening theme and two ending themes. The opening theme is "Fragment: Luminous Ver" written and composed by Tororo and sung by Miyuki Hashimoto. The first ending theme is "Soyokaze no Shirue" (そよ風のシルエ), and the second ending theme is "Kakashi" (カカシ); both ending themes were written and composed by Chiyomaru Shikura and sung by Ayane. The PlayStation 2 version entitled Suika A.S+ Eternal Name has four pieces of theme music, one opening theme and three ending themes. The opening theme is "Fragment: Shooting Star of the Origin" written and composed by Tororo and sung by Minori Chihara. The first, and main, ending theme is "Fragment: Eternal Infinity", also written and composed by Tororo, but sung by Jun Mirono. The second ending theme is "Natsu ga Kureta Okurimono" (夏がくれた贈り物) sung by Yozuca*, and the third ending theme is "Mikansei no Monogatari" (未完成の物語) sung by Kazco. A vocal album for the PlayStation 2 release of Suika entitled Since Fragment was released by Lantis on July 25, 2007.

The OVA's opening theme is "Fragment: The Heat Haze of Summer" by Kamin and the ending theme is "Summer's End" (夏の終わり, Natsu no Owari) by Naotarou Moriyama. The original soundtrack of the OVA series was released by Frontier Works on August 23, 2003 containing one disc. Suika was adapted into four drama CDs released between August 30, 2002 and January 27, 2003 by Movic. Each CD covers each of the four chapters in Suika starting with Minase Itsuki's story in chapter one, and ending with the story of the nameless girl in chapter four.

== Reception and sales ==
According to a national ranking of bishōjo games based on amounts sold in Japan, the limited edition of Suika's CD-ROM release premiered at the second place out of fifty when it was first listed on the chart, and was then dropped to the fortieth in the next ranking. While it did not appear in the next ranking, it appeared again on the chart one month later, at the forty-eighth place, making its final appearance on the charts. The regular edition of the CD-ROM release premiered on the charts at the seventh place twice since its release, and dropped to the twenty-first in its next and last appearance on the charts. The DVD-ROM release premiered on the charts at the seventh place, before dropping to the forty-eighth place in the next, making its final appearance on the charts. When Suika A.S+ was first released, the limited edition release premiered on the chart at the second place, and did not make any further appearances, while the regular edition release debuted and made its only appearance on the charts at the thirty-seventh place.
