= Futakoi =

Japanese light novel, visual novel, & anime series

- The cover of Futakoi--Ama Kara: Night & Day CD issued in Japan on September 24, 2004.

双恋 （ふたこい） (Futako (futa koi))
- Genre: Comedy; Harem; Romance
- Anime television series
- Directed by: Nobuo Tomisawa
- Produced by: Mareyoshi Takano; Gō Yadori; Kazuya Watanabe; Kōji Takeuchi
- Written by: Tomoko Konparu
- Music by: Hajime Kikuchi
- Studio: Telecom Animation Film
- Licensed by: NA: Discotek Media
- Original network: TV Tokyo, TVA, TVO, TVh
- Original run: 6 October 2004 – 29 December 2004
- Episodes: 13
- Video game
- Developer: MediaWorks
- Publisher: MediaWorks
- Genre: Romantic comedy
- Platform: PlayStation 2
- Released: December 9, 2004
- Video game

Futakoijima ~Koi to Mizugi no Survival~
- Developer: MediaWorks
- Publisher: MediaWorks
- Genre: Romantic comedy
- Platform: PlayStation 2
- Released: August 25, 2005
- Other titles
- Futakoi Alternative

Futakoi (Japanese: 双恋; lit. "Twin Love") is a light novel, visual novel and anime television series created by Hina Futaba and Mutsumi Sasaki. The anime aired in Japan in 2004. It replaced Sister Princess as Dengeki G's Magazine premiere flagship title. It tells the story of a boy named Nozomu Futami who goes back to his hometown, moves in near a shrine and encounters beautiful six pairs of twin girls.

== Story ==
Original Two beautiful girls suddenly appear in front of the protagonist a very ordinary second-year junior high school student. The twin sisters who look exactly alike in face, hairstyle, and clothing all said the same thing. "We fell in love with you at first sight! Please, go out with us!" The two then utter some surprising words. "We've always been together, so... why not just have the two of us together?" Thus began a strange love triangle in which he was dating two beautiful twin girls at the same time.

Anime The story begins with Nozomu Futami returning to the town where he was born and raised as a child. He moves in near a shrine which houses a legendary stone that was rumoured to have been the place where twin girls turned into birds. The stone is rumoured to be the cause of an abundance of twin girls who are born in the town. The twins who turned into birds did so because of their love for a man who couldn't choose between them. Shortly after Nozomu enters town he begins to run into the same problems as six pairs of twins fight for his love.

== Protagonist ==
Original Protagonist (オリジナル主人公, Orijinaru shujinkō)
In Novel version he Second-year junior high school student. He moved when it was young and recently returned to the same city. The Sakurazuki sisters are so attractive that they think they're cool when they first meet them. While he is a sensible person who panics at the twins' outrageous actions, he also has the courage to help the twin heroine in trouble without hesitation. He doesn't remember much about childhood friends like the Ichijo sisters and the Momoi sisters. In Comic version 2nd year student at Futai-ji Junior High School. he has accumulated a record of heartbreak, and by chance, he accidentally kisses the Sakurazuki sisters, which leads to he encounters with the twins.In game version a second-year student at Futae Middle School. Due to he parents' overseas transfer, he comes to live in the Rinnōji Temple, where her relatives the Hinagiku family reside. He is tall and has a mature personality for a middle school student.
Nozomu Futami (二見望, Futami Nozomu)
Nozumu is voiced by Motoki Takagi.
The main protagonist character of the anime version. He is a childhood friend of the Ichijō twins and helps the Sakurazuki twins through the "trials" set by their father.

== Twins Heroines ==
Sumireko Ichijō (一条董子, Ichijō Sumireko) and Kaoruko Ichijō (一条薫子, Ichijō Kaoruko)
Sumireko is voiced by Ami Koshimizu and Kaoruko is voiced by Yui Horie
Kaoruko has dark brown hair in a ponytail, while Sumireko has it cut short.She is childhood friends with the protagonist and lived next door to him when they were little, but they were separated when the protagonist moved away. She is very popular with the male students and even has her own fan club. Both sisters are members of the tennis club.Kaoruko has an androgynous sensibility while Sumireko has a bold and playful personality She attends Isshin Academy a girls' junior high school in the neighboring town. They are childhood friends, but recently they have become somewhat estranged due to attending different schools. However unlike other works the protagonist of this work did not move to a faraway town, and instead attended the same elementary school as the sisters. As a result she has known the Momoi sisters since childhood. Twin girls who are Nozomu's childhood friends. They also attend the same school as Nozomu throughout the anime version. They both harbor secret feelings for Nozomu. In kindergarten, they said they would both marry him. Although they are close, they keep their feelings secret from each other and everyone else.
Yura Sakurazuki (桜月ユラ, Sakurazuki Yura) and Kira Sakurazuki (桜月キラ, Sakurazuki Kira)
Yura is voiced by Hiromi Tsunakake and Kira is voiced by Yui Itsuki.
They have long black hair with ribbons on both sides (Kira has pink ribbons and Yura has blue ribbons). Kira's bangs flow to the right while Yura's flow to the left.She is a sheltered young lady who has always attended an all-girls school but one day she falls in love with the protagonist at first sight and despite her parents objections transfers to the protagonist's junior high school. In original she is a transfer student who falls in love with the protagonist at first sight and comes to Soai Junior High School the same school the protagonist attends. Prior to transferring she lived in the upscale residential area of Sakuramaigaoka, and previously attended Gekka Gakuen, another school for rich girls. There is an episode in which it is pointed out that she looks like the Hinagiku sisters but grown up. The classic plot is of the energetic and courageous older sister Kira leading the shy and anxious younger sister Yura, who is also strong-willed .:It is explained during the story that these twin girls lived a luxury life together in their mansion. Their father travels often and employs their butler to take care of them. They undergo many tests written out by their father so they are able to fit into society and live as normal high school girls. In the first episode, they are fifteen years old, but have never been in a convenience store. Unlike Sumireko and Kaoruko, Kira and Yura work together to win Nozomu's favor.
Rara Hinagiku (雛菊らら, Hinagiku Rara) and Ruru Hinagiku (雛菊るる, Hinagiku Ruru)
Rara is voiced by Yurika Ochiai and Ruru is voiced by Shizuka Hasegawa.
Petite girls with black hair who prefer red clothes. Rara has slightly longer hair and a different ribbon shape. Both look exactly like their mother, Miyabi, but also resemble the Ichijō sisters, who are also classmates of the protagonist.The protagonist's cousin. She lives at a temple called 'Sōrin-ji,' and together with her mother Miyabi, she stays home to watch over her father, who has gone to training. The older sister Rara is a bit carefree, while the younger sister Ruru is fearless no matter what happens.The youngest set of twins in the series who live with Nozomu, their mother Miyabi, and pet goat Billy. They are affectionate towards Nozomu and claim him as their future husband which makes Billy jealous.
Ui Chigusa (千草初, Chigusa Ui) and Koi Chigusa (千草恋, Chigusa Koi)
Ui is voiced by Kozue Yoshizumi and Koi is voiced by Natsuko Kuwatani.
Both sisters have long light brown hair. Her first time wearing square glasses with her hair tied straight was Koi, and her round glasses were braided with her hair.her family runs an animal hospital, and he attends a Catholic high school. Their meeting began when the protagonist was hit by a car driven by her father Both of them love animals and are not comfortable talking to people themselves. Although older than the protagonist, she speaks to him in honorifics. At first, she is somewhat calm and rarely clumsy. Koi is clumsy from the start, but there is a difference in being honest and kind. Twin daughters of a veterinary doctor and in the story they help their father in the clinic. Nozomu meets them when he takes Billy to the vet clinic after he ate a fax addressed to Nozomu which got it stuck in his throat.
Ai Momoi (桃衣愛, Momoi Ai) and Mai Momoi (桃衣舞, Momoi Mai)
Ai is voiced by Chiaki Takahashi and Mai is voiced by Minako Sango.
Beige long hair. Ai is naked-eye, and Mai wears oval-lens glasses. When they were young, they were twin sisters who lived next door to the house the protagonist had moved, but when the protagonist moved again, they were separated. At the middle school the protagonist attends, Ai is the homeroom teacher of the protagonist's class, and Mai is a health counselor. She comes from a matrilineal family with a high rate of twin births, and apparently has no father. Ai is cautious and serious, while Mai is flashy and fond of mischief.The oldest of the twins appearing in the series. Ai is the teacher responsible for Nozomu's, Kira's, Yura's and Keisuke's class, while Mai is the school nurse. Ai is cautious and serious, while Mai is flashy and fond of mischief.
Sara Shirogane (白鐘沙羅, Shirogane Sara) and Sōju Shirogane (白鐘双樹, Shirogane Sōju)
Sara is voiced by Kaori Mizuhashi and Sōju is voiced by Mai Kadowaki.
Both sisters have long platinum blonde hair, and Soju ties it into two black ribbons.Because Soju was sickly when she was young, her younger sister Sara wants to protect her older sister Soju, whom she has grown up with. On the first day of school in the year Soju and Sara started separate classes, she met the protagonist soju has a soft and gentle personality. She loves the kind Sara who has tried to protect her since she was little.Sara speaks and acts bluntly; at first, she is aggressive toward the protagonist, but at heart she is very kind, and later, like Sōju, she gradually becomes attracted to him. Twin girls who are the same in all but personality: Sōju is mild-mannered and ill-bodied, whereas Sara is rougher in her speech and more energetic. Nozomu meets Sōju while she was painting at the shrine, and Sara wanted him to be loyal to her. Sara herself has a love-hate relationship with Nozomu. They leave the city before the end of the series and come back at the end.

== Supporting Character ==
Gokokuji Temple (護国寺(護国寺), Gokokuji (Gokokuji))
Gokokuji is voice by Eiji Maruyama
He is the butler of the Sakuratsuki family and the driver for the Sakuratsuki sisters.
The parents of the Sakuratsuki sisters (桜月姉妹の両親, Sakuradzuki shimai no ryōshin)
Kira and Yura's parents. When the two girls announced they wanted to transfer schools to meet the protagonist, they strongly opposed it, but after nine days of discussion, they allowed the transfer. In the main story, they are only mentioned in dialogue, and their appearance is unknown.
The grandmother of the Sakuratsuki sisters (桜月姉妹の祖母, Sakuradzuki shimai no sobo)
The grandmother of Kira and Yura, who also serves as their etiquette teacher. She challenges Kenmochi to a kendo match and, after the protagonist wins by chance, acknowledges his victory and teases him, saying, "If only I were 50 years younger..."
Miyabi Hinagiku (雛菊みや姫, Hinagiku Miyabi)
Miyabi is voiced by Ai Orikasa.
The mother of Rara and Ruru and the shrine maiden of Sourin Temple. Because she is a childhood friend of Nozumu's mother, she allows him to live at her temple while Nozumu's father is studying astronomy in the United States. Nozumu looks to her as a maternal figure after his deceased mother.
Billy (ビリー, Birii)
Billy is voiced by Chiaki Takahashi.
The Hinagiku twins' pet goat. He initially developed a dislike for Nozumu because of Rara and Lula's affections for the main character and often showed his disdain for him by means such as eating his homework, headbutting, or biting him. As the series progresses, Billy and Nozumu develop a friendly rivalry.
Kenmochi (監物, Kenmochi)
Kenmochi is voiced by Masaharu Satō.
The Sakurazuki twins' butler and chief bodyguard. He carries out Kira and Yura's daily tests written out by their father so they are able to fit into society and live as normal high school girls. He at first developed a dislike for Nozumu because he thought Nozumu was trying mug Kira and Yura inside a convenience store in which Nozumu was cleared of wrongdoing. His dislike for the main character continues over the series because of Kira and Yura's affections for Nozumu. At the end of the series, he eventually warms up to him, but he still keeps his suspicions in case Nozumu treats the Sakurazuki twins wrongly.
Keisuke Kosaka (古坂佳右, Kosaka Keisuke)
Keisuke is voiced by Reiko Kiuchi.
Nozumu's best friend and classmate. He rekindles his friendship with Nozumu after the latter returns to his home town. He is sometimes envious of Nozumu's popularity around the twins he encounters through the series.
Juntarō Gonda (近田淳太郎, Gonda Juntarō)
Juntarō is voiced by Daisuke Ono.
A judo student who is a P.E. classmate of Nozumu and Keisuke. He is the leader of the Ichijō Extreme Fan Club, a small group of male students who are fiercely devoted to the adoration and protection of Kaoruko and Sumireko (the twins are unaware of the club). As a result, Nozumu is often at odds with Juntarō and his entourage because of the latter's childhood friendship with the Ichijō twins.
Yūya Hiyama (蔭山結耶, Hiyama Yūya)
Yūya is voiced by Makoto Ishii.
One of Nozumu's childhood friends and an aspiring student in aeronautics. During the beach episode, he tells Nozumu he is planning on confessing his love to Kaoruko, which causes Nozomu to act strangely around the Ichijō sisters. He returns at the end of the series in which he tells Nozumu that they will be friendly and respectable rivals for Kaoruko's affections.

== List of episodes ==
No.	Title	Original release date
1	"The Town with the Twins' Grave"; Transliteration: "Futagotsuka no Arumachide" (Japanese: 双子塚のある街で)	October 6, 2004
Nozomu comes back to the town he grew up before his mother died. He sees a pair of twin girls whom he thinks is his old childhood friends, the Ichijō twins. He realizes they are not his old friends after following them but when he tries to help them after they unknowingly lose their purse in a convenience store, he is accused of being a thief. After he leaves, it turns out that he was wrongly accused. He meets Miyabi and the Hinagiku twins with whom he will be living, along with their pet goat Billy. He finally meets the real Ichijō twins who call at the house. Later when he starts school as a transfer student, he meets the twins he met in the convenience store who are also transfer students. They introduce themselves as the Sakurazuki twins. He also meets Ai, his teacher, and Keisuke, another old childhood friend.
2	"The Ice Cream From My Memories"; Transliteration: "Omoide no Aisukuriimu" (Japanese: 思い出のアイスクリーム)	October 13, 2004
Nozomu goes to the movies with Keisuke. After meeting with the Ichijō sisters' fan club for the first time, Nozomu gets sidetracked and goes into the department store that he and the Ichijō twins used to play in. He meets the Ichijō and Sakurazuki sisters there.
3	"The Flavour of Love in Apple Pie"; Transliteration: "Appurupai wa Koi no Aji" (Japanese: アップルパイは恋の味)	October 20, 2004
The Sakurazuki twins join the home economics class with the Ichijō twins. They are to make apple pie while Nozomu attends the technology class. Both twins ask Nozomu to taste their pies, but their pies end up as failures.
4	"Appointment With Strawberry Tart"; Transliteration: "Ichigotaruto de Machiawase" (Japanese: イチゴタルトで待ち合わせ)	October 27, 2004
Nozomu is planning to meet the Ichijō twins at a cafe to eat strawberry tart the next day, but he doesn't remember where the cafe is. They send him directions by fax because he has to run an errand with the Hinagiku twins. The next day, he is unable to find the fax or the Kaoruko's phone number, but Billy is sick. Nozomu meets Ui and Koi Chigusa at the vet where they discover that Billy had eaten the fax.
5	"Time Starts to Move"; Transliteration: "Ugokidashita Jikan" (Japanese: 動き出した時間)	November 3, 2004
The mid-term tests are coming up and Nozomu has to study, but Billy chews up his English notes. He goes to the Ichijō twins' house and borrows Sumireko's notes and later meets Kaoruko when he is photocopying the notes at the convenience store. He discovers that both Sumireko and Kaoruko only made the childhood promise with him because of the rivalry between them.
6	"The Rocket of Summer"; Transliteration: "Natsu no Roketto" (Japanese: 夏のロケット)	November 10, 2004
Nozomu applies for a holiday course together with Keisuke and the Sakurazuki twins, although it was only Keisuke's idea to apply. There he meets an old friend, Hiyama Yuuya, along with the Ichijō twins, who has earlier invited Nozomu to the beach. Nozomu then became displeased, seeing how the Ichijō twins are being more close to his old friend. Later, Yuuya tells Nozomu of how he feels for Kaoruko.
7	"A Midsummer's Jewel Box"; Transliteration: "Manatsu no Houseki Bako" (Japanese: 真夏の宝石箱)	November 17, 2004
Nozomu, the Ichijō twins, the Hinagiku twins, and Keisuke are invited to the Sakurazuki mansion. After fishing and a barbecue, the group decide to play hide and seek. As Nozomu is trying to find a hiding spot, Yura and Kira let him inside the locked room because he is a special person to them. They confess their love to him and allow him to tell them what he feels about them later.
8	"The White Sketchbook"; Transliteration: "Shiroi Sukecchibukku" (Japanese: 白いスケッチブック)	November 24, 2004
Nozomu meets Sōju painting at the shrine and they become friends. As Nozomu is buying supplies for the culture festival, he realizes that he is being shadowed by a mysterious person and there have been a girl asking about him at school. As he leaves school, Sara appears before him and demands him to go out with Sōju and separate himself from the other twins.
9	"Pastel Sunset"; Transliteration: "Yūyake no Pasuteru" (Japanese: 夕焼けのパステル)	December 1, 2004
Nozomu invites Sōju and Sara to the culture festival. After Sara causes a ruckus at the spooky cafe Nozomu's class had put on, his classmates allow him to have the rest of the day off to get her out. At the art club's room, Sōju is allowed to draw portraits with the art club members but as the festival comes to a close, she faints. Nozomu discovers that one of Sōju's pastel's is gone and searches the dumpster because Sōju's once told him that it was precious to her.
10	"Triangle Christmas"; Transliteration: "Toraianguru Kurisumasu" (Japanese: トライアングル.クリスマス)	December 8, 2004
Nozomu meets with Yuuya at the bookstore and Yuuya decides that he'll confess to Kaoruko on Christmas eve. He then shows a bad attitude towards her unintendingly and then proceeds to the Christmas party, But the Christmas party isn't for everyone. It turns out it's a party just for him and Yura and Kira.
11	"The Wandering Heart's New Year Temple Visit"; Transliteration: "Mayoishin de Hatsumōde" (Japanese: 迷い心で初詣)	December 15, 2004
It's New Years and Nozomu visits the temple with Yura and Kira. At the temple, they run into the Ichijō twins and together they go to a cafe. Nozomu has things on his mind and confuses Kira and Yura for the first time. Kenmochi tells Nozomu that he should be true to his feelings so he doesn't hurt the Sakurazuki twins' feelings.
12	"Valentine Panic"; Transliteration: "Barentain Panikku" (Japanese: バレンタイン.パニック)	December 22, 2004
Valentine is coming soon and the girls are preparing to make chocolate. On Valentine's Day, the Ichijō twins confesses their love for him, followed by the Sakurazuki twins also confessing their love for him. Kenmochi picks up the Sakurazuki twins and tells Nozomu that they will be transferring to another school.
13	"Spring is in the near future" Transliteration: "Harudō Karaji" (Japanese: 春遠からじ...)	December 29, 2004
After Nozomu hears the confession of love from the Ichijō and Sakurazuki twins, he doesn't know how to react to their feelings. Soon after he goes to the rock at the shrine which represents the "legend of the twins who loved the same man". He blames all that has occurred on the "Curse of the Twins". Then Miyabi-san notices Nozomu and lectures him on how he was just trying not to get hurt himself and blaming all this on everyone else's feelings. After realizing his mistake Nozomu chases after the Sakurazuki twins who are on their way to finalize their transfer. Kenmochi who is driving the car doesn't stop for Nozomu. Finally after Nozomu's gets tossed off his bike, Kenmochi stops the car. Nozomu starts begging Kenmochi to stop the transfer. Soon after all of the Sakurazuki twins' classmates arrive and Kenmochi reconsiders. In the end the Sakurazuki twins and Ichijō twins agrees to being rivals for Nozomu's love and the story ends with Nozomu thinking how great it was he came back to this town.

== Video game ==
The Futakoi video game was released on December 9, 2004. It was originally planned for a November 11 release but was delayed. A second video game, Twin Love Island: Survival with Love and Swimsuits (双恋島 〜恋と水着のサバイバル〜, Futakoijima ~Koi to Mizugi no Sabaibaru~) was released August 25, 2005. Both games were made by MediaWorks for the PlayStation 2.

== Novel ==
The Futakoi Novel was released in 2005 in addition to recording the novel from the second season of the series, it also includes newly written new works and comics. Another novel, Futakoi~The season with the twins~ (双恋 〜双子たちといた季節〜, Futako〜futago tachi toita kisetsu〜) is a novelization of the TV anime adaptation of Futakoi.

== See also ==
- Futakoi Alternative – While this series contains the same characters as the original, it has a different storyline and continuity altogether.
