= Futakoi Alternative =

Japanese anime television series

- Cover of the DVD box release by King Records

フタコイ オルタナティブ (Futakoi Orutanatibu)
- Genre: Drama, romance, comedy
- Created by: Hina Futaba, Mutsumi Sasaki
- Anime television series
- Directed by: Takayuki Hirao
- Produced by: Gō Shukuri; Kiyoshi Takano; Kazuya Watanabe
- Written by: Ryunosuke Kingetsu
- Music by: Toshimichi Isoe; Tatsuya Murayama; Shunsuke Suzuki
- Studio: Feel; Studio Flag; Ufotable
- Licensed by: NA: Discotek Media
- Original network: TVA, TVO, et al
- Original run: April 7, 2005 – June 30, 2005
- Episodes: 13
- Video game

Futakoi Alternative: Koi to Shōjo to Machine Gun
- Publisher: Marvelous Interactive
- Genre: Adventure
- Platform: PlayStation 2
- Released: June 23, 2005
- Manga
- Written by: Hina Futaba; Sasaki Mutsumi
- Illustrated by: Kanao Araki
- Magazine: Dengeki Daioh
- Published: 2006
- Volumes: 1

Futakoi Alternative (フタコイ オルタナティブ) is a Japanese anime television series created by character designer Mutsumi Sasaki and planner & scenario writer Hina Futaba. The series was produced by MediaWorks, King Records, Lantis and Yomiko Advertising and animated by Feel, Studio Flag and Ufotable. It ran for 13 episodes from 7 April 2005 to 30 June 2005. The show features many of the characters from the original Futakoi, though the story and settings are completely different. A manga adaptation of the show is illustrated by Kanao Araki.

== Story ==
Futakoi Alternative tells the story of Rentarō Futaba and his detective agency. One day a set of twins, Sara and Sōju, show up at his doorstep. They move in with him and work as secretaries for his agency.

== Characters ==
Protagonist

Rentarō Futaba (双葉恋太郎, Futaba Rentarō) Voiced by: Tomokazu Seki
Rentarō Futaba is the main protagonist character and the son of a legendary detective. He is very good at fighting, though he does not fight often. He has a lot of luck around twins and eventually they all fall for him.

Twins Heroines

Sara Shirogane (白鐘沙羅, Shirogane Sara) Voiced by: Kaori Mizuhashi
Sara Shirogane is high spirited and more outgoing than her twin sister. She is always bossy with Rentarō, although she really respects him and seems to have a strong affection toward him.
Sōju Shirogane (白鐘双樹, Shirogane Sōju) Voiced by: Mai Kadowaki
Sōju Shirogane is a foil for her sister; she is quiet, and not as outgoing as Sara. She is good at cooking, and also has a strong affection toward Rentarō.
Kaoruko Ichijō (一条薫子, Ichijō Kaoruko) Voiced by: Horie Yui
Kaoruko Ichijō is a shrine maiden along with her twin sister Sumireko.
Sumireko Ichijō (一条菫子, Ichijō Sumireko) Voiced by: Ami Koshimizu
Sumireko Ichijō is Kaoruko's twin sister, and like her twin, a shrine maiden.
Kira Sakurazuki (桜月キラ, Sakurazuki Kira) Voiced by: Yui Itsuki
Kira Sakurazuki is one of the twin granddaughters of the local yakuza boss. Occasionally the twins dress up as masked heroines battling against the yakuza's various underground activities.
Yura Sakurazuki (桜月ユラ, Sakurazuki Yura) Voiced by: Hiromi Tsunakake
Yura Sakurazuki is Kira's twin sister.
Ruru Hinagiku (雛菊るる, Hinagiku Ruru) Voiced by: Shizuka Hasegawa
Ruru Hinagiku is one of the pair who are the youngest twins in the series. She along with her sister Rara appear to be involved in some sort of military special operations, being experts in various weapons from handguns to rifles, and even explosives and rocket propelled weapons, carrying all their weapons in their backpacks. They appear in the first episode locked in a battle against an invading alien on board a stricken military transport plane, before they detonate the plane and bail out with their parachutes.
Rara Hinagiku (雛菊らら, Hinagiku Rara) Voiced by: Yurika Ochiai
Rara Hinagiku is the twin sister of Ruru Hinagiku.
Ui Chigusa (千草初, Chigusa Ui) Voiced by: Kozue Yoshizumi
Ui Chigusa and her twin sister Koi Chigusa run a veterinary clinic. They request the aid of the Futaba Detective Agency to track down a missing dog.
Koi Chigusa (千草恋, Chigusa Koi) Voiced by: Natsuko Kuwatani
Koi Chigusa is the twin sister of Ui Chigusa.
Ai Momoi (桃衣愛, Momoi Ai) Voiced by: Chiaki Takahashi
Ai Momoi and her twin sister Mai Momoi were once classmates with Rentarō and had a relationship with him similar to his current relationship with the Shirogane twins. Since their school days, they have had a falling out, both with Rentarō and with each other.
Mai Momoi (桃衣舞, Momoi Mai) Voiced by: Minako Sango
Mai Momoi is the twin sister of Ai Momoi.

Other

== Video game ==
A video game adaptation for PlayStation 2 titled Twin Love Alternative: Love, Girls, and Machineguns (フタコイ オルタナティブ 恋と少女とマシンガン, Futakoi Orutanatibu Koi to Shōjo to Mashingan) was released by Marvelous Interactive on June 23, 2005.

== Music ==
Opening Theme
"New World" by Bae Yumi (배유미) (of M.I.L.K)
Ending Theme
"Bokura no Jikan" (ぼくらの時間) by eufonius

== Episode list ==
No.	Title	Original release date
1	"Croquettes, Helicopters, Underground Boxing and I"; Transliteration: "Kuroke to Heri to Chika Bokushingu to Watashi" (Japanese: コロッケとヘリと地下ボクシングと私)	April 6, 2005
2	"No-name Day"; Transliteration: "Nō-Nēmu·Dei" (Japanese: ノーネーム·デイ)	April 13, 2005
3	"Emerald Mountain Yeah!"; Transliteration: "Emerarudo Maunten·Hai" (Japanese: エメラルドマウンテン·ハイ)	April 20, 2005
4	"NIKOPAKU Rhapsody"; Transliteration: "Nikopaku·Rapusodi" (Japanese: ニコパク·ラプソディ)	April 27, 2005
5	"7 Dayz (...and Happy Dayz)" (Japanese: 7DAYZ(...and Happy Dayz))	May 4, 2005
6	"Why Did You Separate, Even Though You Love Each Other?"; Transliteration: "Dōshite Sukina no ni Wakare Chatta no>" (Japanese: どうして好きなのに別れちゃったの?)	May 11, 2005
7	"Futaba Rentarou's First Case"; Transliteration: "Futaba Rentarō Saisho no Jiken" (Japanese: 双葉恋太郎最初の事件)	May 18, 2005
8	"Sa is for Sayonara"; Transliteration: "Sa wa Sayonara no Sa" (Japanese: サはさよならのサ)	May 25, 2005
9	"Futakoi"; Transliteration: "Futakoi" (Japanese: フタコイ)	June 1, 2005
10	"Dance Like a Bear, Sting Like a Squid"; Transliteration: "Kuma no Yō ni Mai Ika no Yō ni Sasu" (Japanese: クマのように舞い イカのように刺す)	June 8, 2005
11	"Futagotamagawa in Flames"; Transliteration: "Moeru Futagotamagawa" (Japanese: 燃える二子魂川)	June 15, 2005
12	"To the Place Where There is Light"; Transliteration: "Hikari Aru Basho e" (Japanese: 光ある場所へ)	June 22, 2005
13	"We Want to Be Three"; Transliteration: "3-ri de Itai" (Japanese: 3人でいたい)	June 29, 2005

== See also ==
- Futakoi - by use same twins characters original
