= Sister Princess =

Japanese light novel series

- Sister Princess logo

シスター・プリンセス (Shisutā Purinsesu)
- Genre: Comedy, Drama, Harem
- Light novel
- Written by: Sakurako Kimino
- Illustrated by: Naoto Tenhiro
- Published by: MediaWorks
- Magazine: Dengeki G's Magazine
- Original run: March 1999 – September 2003
- Volumes: 12
- Video game
- Developer: MediaWorks
- Publisher: MediaWorks
- Genre: Visual novel
- Platform: PlayStation
- Released: 2001
- Anime television series
- Directed by: Kiyotaka Ohata (1–12); Ikuji Inada (13–26); Matsuo Asami (13–26) (Note: Chief Unit Director (チーフ演出))
- Produced by: Atsushi Moriyama; Tomoko Kawasaki; Kazuya Watanabe; Kiyoshi Takano
- Written by: Masaharu Amiya
- Music by: Takayuki Hattori
- Studio: Zexcs
- Licensed by: NA: ADV Films (expired) Discotek Media (2018-04-23)
- Original network: TV Tokyo
- Original run: April 4, 2001 – October 6, 2001
- Episodes: 26
- Manga

Sister Princess: 12 Promises
- Written by: Kizuku Itsukawa
- Published by: Media Works
- Magazine: Dengeki Daioh
- Original run: June 2001 – July 2002
- Video game

Sister Princess 2
- Developer: MediaWorks
- Publisher: MediaWorks
- Genre: Visual novel
- Platform: PlayStation
- Released: 2002
- Anime television series

Sister Princess: RePure
- Directed by: Tsubame Shimodaya (TV); Nagisa Miyazaki (Specials)
- Produced by: Atsushi Moriyama; Tomoko Kawasaki; Kazuya Watanabe; Kiyoshi Takano
- Written by: Masaharu Amiya
- Music by: I've Sound
- Studio: Zexcs
- Licensed by: NA: Discotek Media (2018-04-23)
- Original network: TXN (TV Tokyo)
- Original run: October 4, 2002 – December 25, 2002
- Episodes: 13 + 12 Specials
- Video game

Sister Princess -Re Pure-
- Developer: MediaWorks
- Publisher: MediaWorks
- Genre: Visual novel
- Platform: Game Boy Advance
- Released: 2003

Sister Princess (Japanese: シスター・プリンセス, Hepburn: Shisutā Purinsesu) is a Japanese light novel series written by Sakurako Kimino and illustrated by Naoto Tenhiro that began serialization in 1999 and ended in 2003. In 2001, a manga series and a bishōjo game for the PlayStation were released. Sequels to the game were released for the PlayStation and Game Boy Advance.

Sister Princess was also adapted into two anime television series, both broadcast on TV Tokyo. The first series was produced in 2001 for 26 episodes. The second, Sister Princess: RePure, aired 13 episodes in 2002.

== Gameplay ==
The premise behind Sister Princess is that an ordinary young man (the player) is made to live with twelve lovable little sisters, each with their own distinct quirks and personalities. The game itself plays out like a dating sim. Players have about a month to spend with the sisters with each day broken up into three segments: first is the free time period before noon, followed by the period after lunch and ending with another period of time before bed. During day time, the player can choose which of the girls he wishes to escort to school, if any. The period after lunch is similar to the one in the morning, with additional choices which allow the player to go to various places in town besides walking home with one of the girls. Every night before bed, the player will be allowed to check his e-mail and send replies. As the player continues to interact with the sisters, their reactions to their big brother will change accordingly until the ending.

There are two different endings for each sister: the normal ending and the "non-blood relation" ending. As the name would suggest, the special ending reveals that the brother-character and sister are not actually related by blood. In the case of some of the older sisters, this can lead to the protagonist and "sister" marrying one another. In the original Sister Princess, the player can see two different endings for each sister, but Sister Princess 2 has four endings for each sister. The first two were the non-sibling relation and siblings-together ending and, if the player chooses one sister in the beginning but ends up with another sister, either of the other two endings for the first sister who the player does not choose appear ("non-blood relation" ending and "still brother and sister forever" ending also) but with a different story.

For Sister Princess 2, the story begins on the final day of school before summer vacation. Then the player chooses a sister who he wants to start with for a close relationship. Therefore, Sister Princess 2 is about spending the player's time with either one sister or all sisters at the same time as they spend their summer together. Especially in Sister Princess 2, the player can spend the summer with all the sisters, not just one, in a special ending where the sisters invite their brother to a summer party where the brother and the sisters would swear to be together forever.

== Characters ==
=== Twelve sisters ===
The Twelve Sisters as they appear in the anime, ordered according to birthday: 1st row L-R: Kaho, Shirayuki, Chikage; 2nd row L-R: Marie, Haruka, Yotsuba; 3rd row L-R; Rinrin, Hinako, Karen; 4th row L-R: Mamoru, Aria, Sakuya

Each sister has a unique method of addressing her older brother. Each method is derived from either onii-san or ani, both of which mean "older brother". However, most of the methods are rarely or never used in Japanese culture, except for Karen's onii-chan and Rinrin's aniki. There is never any sibling rivalry among the sisters: although they certainly each vie for his time and attention, they never see themselves as competitors; their unconditional love for him only strengthens their bonds with one another. The sisters not only regularly hang out with one another (often to exchange tales of how wonderful a brother he is), but they also arrange to "share" him when he inadvertently neglects to or cannot regularly visit any of them.

Haruka (春歌; "Spring song")
Voiced by: Yumi Kakazu (Japanese); Tiffany Grant (English)
Hailing from Germany, Haruka aspires to become a perfect Japanese lady (Yamato Nadeshiko). She is frequently seen wearing a kimono and can be found learning Japanese tea ceremony (sado) along with other cultural things. Haruka is an expert at handling the daikyu and naginata. Training in these weapons is akin to the training given to the brides of samurai; Haruka's training in these weapons may or may not have been inspired due to her desire to be a perfect Japanese bride for a person of high standing—like her brother.
Haruka addresses the brother as Anigimi-sama (兄君さま), the honorific suffix -kimisama (a combination of the honofirics kimi or kun and -sama) used to address a venerable person in the same bloodline. In English, she calls him "Beloved Brother" and speaks with a German accent.
Hinako (雛子; "Little child")
Voiced by: Chiemi Chiba (Japanese); Serena Varghese (English)
The youngest of the sisters, Hinako is very much a child and shows her affection accordingly. In the anime, Hinako frequently insists on her brother reading to her from picture books.
Hinako refers to herself in the third person as "Hina", dropping the "-ko". She addresses her brother as Onii-tama (おにいたま), a more childish version of Kaho's onii-chama. In English, she calls him "Bro-bro".
Kaho (花穂; "Flower petal")
Voiced by: Hisayo Mochizuki (Japanese); Cynthia Martinez (English)
Despite being a bit clumsy, Kaho is on her school's cheerleading team and loves to cheer her brother on. She is an accomplished gardener, and frequently grows flowers for and with her brother. She refers to herself in the third person and addresses her brother as Onii-chama (お兄ちゃま), a childish version of onii-sama. In English, she calls him "Brother".
Karen
Voiced by: Natsuko Kuwatani (Japanese); Hilary Haag (English)
Sweet and gentle, Karen’s personality sometimes seems more suitable for an older (rather than younger) sister. She is a very skilled pianist. In the magazine stories and mini-novels, Karen owns a kitten named Vanilla (who, incidentally, has a thing for vanilla flavored sweets). Like several of the sisters, she refers to herself in the third person and addresses her brother as Onii-chan (お兄ちゃん), a way to call a brother by a younger sibling, usually a child. In English, she calls him "Big Brother".
Mamoru (衛; "Guardian")
Voiced by: Yumiko Kobayashi (Japanese); Kira Vincent-Davis (English)
The athlete of the group, Mamoru is always trying to get her brother to play sports with her. She is sometimes mistaken for Rinrin due to their similar hairstyles and their penchant for donning their eyewear on their head. As she is a tomboy, Mamoru uses phrases and mannerisms that only boys are expected to. As proof of this, she addresses her brother as Anii (あにぃ), a shorter address used by a male teenager. In English, she calls him "Big Bro".
Marie (鞠絵; "Nurtured picture")
Voiced by: Ryouka Yuzuki (Japanese); Sasha Paysinger (English)
Possessing a weak constitution, the bespectacled Marie has spent a lot of time in the hospital due to her illness. Her pet Michael, a Golden Retriever, acts as her guardian and friend when her brother isn't around. She addresses her brother as Aniue-sama (兄上様), the honorific -uesama (a combination of ue and -sama) being used within the royal family or as a sign of politeness. In English, she calls him "Brother Mine".
Aria (亞里亞)
Voiced by: Nana Mizuki (Japanese); Mariela Ortiz (English)
Hailing from France, Aria is a rather soft-spoken character who has a tendency to cry whenever there is trouble, uttering the phrase "kusu" (an onomatopoeia for sniffling) when doing so. She enjoys sweets, especially French cuisines, and can usually be found wearing very frilly dresses with plenty of lace and bows. She refers to herself in the third person, which is considered childish in Japanese culture, and speaks slowly.
In the first anime, Wataru comments that time seems to pass more slowly around Aria, especially to someone who is used to the high-paced life of the city. In the second anime, Aria comments that being in the brother's company relieves her of her 'sleepy feelings', energizing her.
She addresses the brother as Ani-ya (兄や) the most childish name for one's brother. In English, she calls him "Mon Frère" (French for "My Brother Friend"). Her birthday is March 3, is a Pisces, and stands 139 cm (about 4' 7") tall.
Chikage
Voiced by: Ami Koshimizu (Japanese); Shelley Calene-Black (English)
Mysterious and occasionally gothic, Chikage is very much into spellcraft, the occult, and religion. She is an accomplished practitioner of dark magic, but prefers to utilize her sorcery in subtle methods, rather than brute power. Common images associated with her are the Eastern Chinese Phoenix, Tarot and Oracle, Catholic Christian cross and butterflies.
She calls the brother as Ani-kun (兄くん), the suffix -kun being an address to a boy who has a close relation or is about the same age as the addresser, giving the impression that her age is close to him. In English, she calls him "Brother Darling". Her birthday is July 3, is a Cancer, and stands 157 cm (about 5' 2") tall.
Rinrin
Voiced by: Chiro Kanzaki (Japanese); Nancy Novotny (English)
Gifted in the fields of science and technology, Rinrin spends a lot of her time building things but constantly asks her brother for monetary donations to keep her projects going. Lately, she's been constructing a robot duplicate of herself, Mecha-Rinrin. She speaks with a strong Chinese accent and addresses her brother as Aniki (アニキ), another way for a boy to address his brother. In English, she calls him "Bro".
Sakuya (咲耶; "Curious blossom")
Voiced by: Yui Horie (Japanese); Monica Rial (English)
Sakuya behaves very much like a modern teenager and is fashion conscious. She would love for her brother to see her as a woman and not just a sister.
In both anime, Sakuya claims that she and the brother are connected by the "red string of fate" and expresses the desire that she might somehow marry her brother. She is quick to agree it would be impossible when in his presence. In the anime, Sakuya is arguably the most emotionally vulnerable of all the sisters where the brother is concerned, since she goes through extreme emotional reactions when they are separated—or when she anticipates separation. In the first anime, Sakuya frequently uses double entendres and innuendo when speaking to her brother, dismissing her words as jokes when he becomes really flustered.
Sakuya addresses her brother as Onii-sama (お兄様) as her sign of admiration. In English, she calls him "Dear Brother".

Shirayuki (白雪; "White snow")
Voiced by: Hyo-sei (Japanese); Jessica Boone (English)
Shirayuki loves to cook, especially for her brother, and is always trying out new recipes for him. She refers to herself in the third person as "Hime" (姫), which translates to "princess". This might be because of her name's Western variant: Snow White. She also frequently ends her sentences with the phrase "desu-no." She addresses her brother as Nii-sama (にいさま), which is shorter than Sakuya's, but polite. In English, she calls him "Elder Brother".
Yotsuba (四葉; "Four-leaf clover")
Voiced by: Tomoe Hanba (Japanese); Luci Christian (English)
Hailing from England (as evidenced by her occasional penchant for anything with a Union Flag), Yotsuba fancies herself a detective à la Sherlock Holmes. She can often be found with either a digital camera or a magnifying glass in hand, trying to spy on her brother. In the magazine stories and mini-novels, Yotsuba owns an unnamed talking toucan (not surprisingly, it can only say "checki" and "Ani-chama"). She refers to herself in the third person and is fond of using the catchphrase, "Checky!" (チェキ!, Cheki). In the first Sister Princess anime, Yotsuba does not have a pet, but owns a toy bird aptly named "Watson", whom she keeps in a cage like a real bird.
She addresses her brother as Ani-chama (兄チャマ), which is a childish address similar to Kaho's, but laced with a British accent. In English, she calls him "Brother Dearest".

=== Supporting ===
Jiiya (じいや)
Voiced by: Kahoru Sasajima
Aria's lady's maid. She's actually a young woman in her early or mid twenties, but Aria calls her 'Jiiya', a Japanese nickname for a butler, like the English 'Jeeves'. The exact reason for this is uncertain, but most agree its Aria's way of being playful. In the second anime series, it is possibly implied that Aria is simply used to calling the person taking care of her 'Jii-ya', as she points at a picture of an old man in butler's clothing, then at her maid and calls them both 'Jii-ya'. Of all the non-sister characters in Sister Princess, only Jiiya has a personal affectionate name for the sister's brother. She addresses the brother as Nii-ya-sama (兄や様), a more polite version of Aria's address.
Kakinomoto (柿ノ本)
Voiced by: Sakura Nogawa
Featured only in Sister Princess 2, Kakinomoto is one of the handful of non-related girls allowed to be near the sisters' brother without causing any issues. She has been known to disagree with him, and played something of a devil's advocate role. A very close friend of Haruka. Has a preference to be called Pride, rather than her given name.
Marie's Nurse (看護婦, kangofu; "Nurse")
The unnamed nurse who attends to Marie. Due to the nature of her duties and Marie's regular medical needs, she has constant contact with the sisters' brother (although not as frequent as Jiiya), and is one of the few non-sisters able to approach him without causing concern.
Mecha Rinrin (メカ鈴凛, Meka Rinrin)
Voiced by: Chiro Kanzaki
Mecha Rinrin is a gynoid designed to be an identical copy of its creator as an experiment in robotics. In the anime, her purpose is also to lend full support to the brother in the absence of any of his sisters. Mecha Rinrin differs from her creator in her eye color and the unexplained requirement of a ball-shaped sensor on her head. Mecha Rinrin always overheats and inadvertently deactivates when the sisters' brother praises her; presumably from overwhelming joy. It appears Rinrin programmed her doppelgänger too well, as it shares an overwhelming love for him, although her delicate circuitry cannot handle the overload.
In the first anime, Rinrin explains that she created her doppelgänger because she eventually intends to study in the United States. When that happens, she wants Mecha Rinrin to be there to do all the things for her brother that she herself won't be available for. Rinrin herself feels sad at the thought that she might actually have made herself redundant until she is reassured by Wataru. Also in the anime, her dopplegänger's immediate precursor is a much larger robot with a more robotic appearance, known as ProtoRobo or Pooh. While this robot looks less sophisticated, it is much more stable and capable of feats of strength and quite delicate manipulations. It also seems to care for its creator's well-being.
Mecha Rinrin addresses the brother as Aniki (アニキ), just like her creator.
Michael (ミカエル, Mikaeru)
Marie's loyal and highly intelligent Golden Retriever. Despite the name, Michael (named after the archangel) is a female, and eventually gives birth to a litter of puppies. Michael was a gift from her brother, to keep company and guard over her at the times when he could not. The pet also serves to give Marie inner strength, as having Michael depend on her proves she is stronger than others think.
Nun (尼僧, nisō)
Featured only in Sister Princess 2. The local temple nun who the brother visits to addresses many of Chikage's spiritual concerns.

=== Anime-only characters ===
Mamimi Yamagami (山神 眞深美, Yamagami Mamimi)
Voiced by: Kyoko Hikami (Japanese); Christine Auten (English)
Mamimi, or Mami (眞深) for short, is initially regarded by those new to the anime as the "13th sister." In fact, like the sisters, she has a pet name for Wataru: An-chan (あんちゃん), or "Bud" in the English dub. However, she is just a girl posing as one of Wataru's sisters after he mistakes her as such, and she is sent by someone to watch over him and break him away from the sisters so she can bring him back to Tokyo.
Mami can be regarded as a pseudo-antagonist because of her mission, but she mostly acts as comic relief, even learning why the sisters love him very much. Eventually, she becomes a source of advice to Wataru and even goes after him when he returns to Tokyo, hoping to return him to the island.
In marked contrast to the sisters themselves, Mami treats him differently, acting as if she is more of a friend than a sibling (though towards the ending of the series, however, there are some hints that Mami might be developing deeper feelings towards Wataru). Furthermore, she doesn't bring a lot of things to Promised Island (only clothes and camping gear) with a hand-held computer and possibly a sewing machine as (arguably) her only luxuries.
Although she is not really Wataru's sister, she is somebody's sister. She always receives e-mails from her real brother, demanding whatever happened to Wataru and her plans to bring him back, much to her chagrin.
Towards the end of the series, it is confirmed that Akio, Wataru's friend in Tokyo, was Mami's older brother. The two are initially seen to have a bad relationship, with Akio treating his sister more as an agent than as a sibling and her caring little for him. Akio accuses Mami of having grown decadent on Promised Island, whereas she finds his intentions for Wataru to be distasteful. Later, they seem to be growing a little closer to each other, Mami managing to playfully tease Akio and him reminiscing a little about their past together; apparently she used to address her brother with the nickname she has bestowed on Wataru, 'An-chan'.
Taro Yamada (山田 太郎, Yamada Tarō)
Voiced by: Kappei Yamaguchi (Japanese); Greg Ayres (English)
Yamada is the third ferry passenger who goes with Wataru and Mami to Promised Island so he would enroll at the school there. As soon as he finds out about Wataru's many sisters, he becomes very envious of Wataru. Yamada then proceeds to be more positive and outgoing towards Wataru shortly after, specifically whenever he is around his sisters in order to get closer to them. But eventually, he does begin to consider Wataru as a real friend and Wataru himself meets up with Yamada on the school roof occasionally to ask for advice.
Ironically, at one point, Wataru offered to switch places with Yamada due to still being freaked out about his current living situation. Yamada, believing that Wataru is stating arbitrary facts about how much better his place was than his, refuses pessimistically. At this time, he did not know of Wataru's sisters. However, he never once looked back on this decision again after later finding out about them, hinting that he simply forgot about the proposition altogether.
Akio Yamagami (山神 燦緒, Yamagami Akio)
Voiced by: Ryotaro Okiayu (Japanese); Chris Patton (English)
Akio is Wataru's best friend back in Tokyo and the recipient of Wataru's e-mails which the latter writes at the beginning and end of almost every episode.
He has plans to have himself, Wataru, and another friend, Minai, to go to the same high school together and eventually become the elite men in society. But this plan fails after Wataru's failure in the entrance exam. The continuation of his plan is the reason why he sent his little sister Mami to watch over Wataru. At the end of the anime, Akio is jarred from his own vision of the future by Wataru's refusal to stay in Tokyo. He follows Wataru to Promised Island in the company of Mami and enrolls there, according to him in an effort to find out 'what is truly cool', based on a comment from Mami that his original plans for the future weren't.
Jiiya (じいや)
Voiced by: Toshihide Tsuchiya (Japanese); John Swasey (English)
Separate from Aria's maid from the game, Jiiya (or Jeeves in the English dub) is, simply put, Wataru's old butler, who reports to Wataru in the first episode that he was leaving because he had promised Wataru's father that he would take care of Wataru until he graduated from junior high school and then sent Wataru to Promised Island. However, since then, Jiiya has been seen in numerous different guises just to watch over him, too, especially on his past.
Promised and Dream Girl of Sakamoto Hideo
Voiced by: Sakura Nogawa (Japanese); Kim Prause (English)
This young girl's ghost, wearing a yellow dress and hat, is somehow related to Wataru in some way and frequently appears in strange places. Wataru never sees the Dream Girl until towards the ending of the first season. Later on, he discovers why she was appearing after he leaves Tokyo for the third and final time. The Dream Girl is meant to act as a human figmentation reminder of a promise he made that he would one day return to Promised Island.
Wataru recalls childhood memories with the Promised Girl at his old vacation house allocated on the beach of Promised Island. But she states that she lives on inside all of Wataru's sisters' hearts, confirming that she is in fact a ghost of a deceased person. However, at the last scene of the first season, as the camera approaches the vacation house and goes in the room where her yellow hat resided, she is seen picking it up followed by a fadeout.

She is later revealed as Honda Karen.

Minai (皆井)
Voiced by: Hisayoshi Izaki (Japanese); Mark X. Laskowski (English)
Minai is a friend of Akio and Wataru back in Tokyo. When Wataru failed the entrance exam, he was the one who passed instead. He appears in the first and penultimate episodes.

== Development ==
The history of Sister Princess can be traced back to March 1999, when it first appeared in the monthly Dengeki G's Magazine. Originally, there were only nine sisters, not twelve. Readers were able to vote for their favorite sister and following the tremendous response from the fans, the magazine decided to serialize Sister Princess. In March 2000, a decision was made to renew the series, this time by featuring the short letters that the girls wrote to their beloved brother. Three more sisters were added to the mix: Haruka, who came from Germany; Yotsuba, who came from England; and Aria, who came from France.

A year later, on March 8, 2001, the game version of Sister Princess—about the older brother spending a month with all twelve sisters, and featuring original artwork by Naoto Tenhiro—was released on the Sony PlayStation. The game was the third best-selling title in Japan in its first week of release. In July of the same year, a new series of stories began in Dengeki G's, right up till April 2002. While the magazine was preparing for yet another renewal of the Sister Princess stories for its May 2002 issue, a premium edition of the game (the original plus two other Christmas and Valentine side stories) was released for the Sega Dreamcast on Mar 28, 2002. In September 2003, the series was retired as the Dengeki G's Magazine premier flagship title (replaced by another popular series, Futakoi).

== Media ==
=== Games ===
- Sister Princess (PlayStation, 2001)
- Sister Princess -Pure Stories- (PlayStation, 2001)
- Sister Princess Premium Edition (Dreamcast, 2002)
- Sister Princess 2 (PlayStation, 2002)
- Sister Princess -Re Pure- (Game Boy Advance, 2003)
- Sister Princess 2 Premium Fan Disc (PlayStation, 2003)

=== Anime ===
==== Region 1 DVD releases by ADV Films ====
- Sister Princess Volume 1: Oh, Brother! (DVD, 2004-10-19)
- Sister Princess Volume 1: Oh, Brother! (DVD+art box+postcard book, 2004-10-19)
- Sister Princess Volume 2: Sibling Revelry (DVD, 2004-10-19)
- Sister Princess Volume 3: Sisters and Sunshine (DVD, 2004-12-14)
- Sister Princess Volume 4: Brotherly Love (DVD, 2005-02-08)
- Sister Princess Volume 5: Gifts from the Heart (DVD, 2005-05-17)
- Sister Princess Volume 6: One Big Happy Family (DVD, 2005-06-28)
- Sister Princess Volume 7: Brother, Where Art Thou? (DVD, 2005-08-02)
- Sister Princess Complete Collection: (5 DVD version, 2006-06-20, 2009-02-24)

==== Region A Blu-ray releases by Eastern Star/Discotek Media ====
- Sister Princess The Complete Original TV Series (2018-06-26)
- Sister Princess Re Pure The Complete Series! (2018-06-26)

==== Japanese UMD releases (anime series) ====
The anime series was released in UMD format for the PlayStation Portable. Features in these UMDs include character designs and textless opening and ending sequences.

- Sister Princess & Sister Princess Repure I (UMD, November 23, 2005)
- Sister Princess & Sister Princess Repure II (UMD, December 21, 2005)
- Sister Princess & Sister Princess Repure III (UMD, January 25, 2006)
- Sister Princess & Sister Princess Repure IV (UMD, February 22, 2006)
- Sister Princess & Sister Princess Repure V (UMD, March 26, 2006)
- Sister Princess & Sister Princess Repure VI (UMD, April 26, 2006)
- Sister Princess & Sister Princess Repure VII (UMD, May 26, 2006)

== In other works ==
=== Summer Radish Vacation 2!! ===
In the visual novel Summer Radish Vacation 2!! by 0verflow, Rinrin is featured as a character and is identified as the daughter of Tomaru Sawagoe. This establishes a connection between her sisters and the wider family of characters within the School Days universe. The work also depicts a relationship between Rinrin and Kuu Hazama, in which the two are shown to have a child.
