= List of Toradora! volumes =

Toradora! is a Japanese light novel series written by Yuyuko Takemiya and illustrated by Yasu. The series is published by ASCII Media Works under their Dengeki Bunko imprint. Ten novels were released between March 2006 and March 2009. The series has been licensed for English publication by Seven Seas Entertainment. A spin-off series, titled Toradora Spin-off!, ran for three volumes between May 2007 and April 2010.

== Toradora! ==
| No. | Original release date | Original ISBN | English release date | English ISBN |
|---|---|---|---|---|
| 1 | March 10, 2006 | 978-4-8402-3353-8 | May 1, 2018 | 978-1-626927-95-7 |
| 2 | May 10, 2006 | 978-4-8402-3438-2 | August 7, 2018 | 978-1-626928-61-9 |
| 3 | September 10, 2006 | 978-4-8402-3551-8 | November 20, 2018 | 978-1-626929-38-8 |
| 4 | January 10, 2007 | 978-4-8402-3681-2 | February 5, 2019 | 978-1-626929-89-0 |
| 5 | August 10, 2007 | 978-4-8402-3932-5 | May 14, 2019 | 978-1-642750-57-7 |
| 6 | December 10, 2007 | 978-4-8402-4117-5 | July 23, 2019 | 978-1-642751-12-3 |
| 7 | April 10, 2008 | 978-4-04-867019-7 | October 22, 2019 | 978-1-642757-07-1 |
| 8 | August 10, 2008 | 978-4-04-867170-5 | December 24, 2019 | 978-1-642757-39-2 |
| 9 | October 10, 2008 | 978-4-04-867265-8 | January 28, 2020 | 978-1-64505-178-7 |
| 10 | March 10, 2009 | 978-4-04-867593-2 | June 23, 2020 (digital); August 4, 2020 (print) | 978-1-64505-438-2 |

== Toradora Spin-off! ==
| No. | Japanese release date | Japanese ISBN |
|---|---|---|
| 1 | May 10, 2007 | 978-4-8402-3838-0 |
| 2 | January 10, 2009 | 978-4-04-867459-1 |
| 3 | April 10, 2010 | 978-4-04-868456-9 |
