= List of Toradora! chapters =

Toradora! manga volume 1 cover

Toradora! is a Japanese manga series written by Yuyuko Takemiya and illustrated by Zekkyo, based on the light novel series of the same name. It was serialized in MediaWorks' shonen manga magazine Dengeki Comic Gao!, but since May 2008 it is serialized in ASCII Media Works' manga magazine Dengeki Daioh. North American publisher Seven Seas Entertainment published the first volume in English language in March 2011. In Indonesia, Elex Media Komputindo published the first volume in July 2011 in Indonesian. In Mexico, Editorial Kamite published the first volume in January 2016 in Spanish.

== Volume list ==
No.	Original release date	Original ISBN	English release date	English ISBN
1	February 27, 2008	978-4-840242-19-6	March 1, 2011	978-1-934876-94-7
1. "Enter the Palmtop Tiger!" (手乗りタイガー参上！, Tenori Taigā Sanjō!); 2. "Midnight Assault" (真夜中の奇襲, Mayonaka no Kishū); 3. "Right in Front of Your Nose" (目と鼻の先には…, Metohananosaki Niwa...); 4. "Pass Practice Plan for Love" (恋のパス練大作戦！, Koi no Pasu Neōsakusen!); 5. "Ryuuji & Taiga's First Group Project" (大河と竜児、はじめての共同作業, Taiga to Ryūji, Hajimete no Kyōdō Sagyō); 6. "That Rumored Pair" (噂の二人, Uwasa no Futari); Extra. "A Day in the Life of Ya-chan" (やっちゃんの一日, Ya-chan no Ichinichi)
Ryuuji Takasu is starting his second year of high school but his appearance resembles that of a delinquent thug because of his glaring eyes. He hopes to make friends with his crush, Minori Kushieda, but accidentally bumps into and is chewed out by Taiga Aisaka, a petite, sharp-tongued classmate known as the Palmtop Tiger, who is best friends with Minori. He later discovers that Taiga has mistakenly placed in his bag a love letter to his only friend Yusaku Kitamura. As Taiga comes to his apartment to attack him to recover the letter (which is actually just an empty envelope), Ryuuji stops her and she faints from hunger. Ryuuji and Taiga make a deal where they will help each other meet their crushes. Ryuuji discovers Taiga lives alone in the apartment complex next door and has a dirty kitchen, so he cleans her apartment and offers to cook for her. During gym class, Ryuuji and Taiga try to create a situation where Taiga would be left alone with Yusaku but it backfires as Ryuuji hits Taiga on the head with a ball instead. They try to set up a lunch double date, but Yusaku and Minori are called away for activities. At the end of school, Taiga tries to give Yusaku a bag of cookies she made in home economics class, but Yusaku rushes off so that she can't catch up. The next day, the classmates think Ryuuji and Taiga are a couple since they spend so much time together, such that Minori gets worried and pulls them aside. The bonus chapter follows a typical day at home for Yasuko Takasu, Ryuuji's mother who works nights at a hostess in a night club.
2	February 27, 2009	978-4-048676-33-5	July 5, 2011	978-1-934876-60-2
7. "A Beautiful Couple" (お似合いの二人, Oniai no Futari); 8. "In One Small Heart" (その小さな胸に, Sono Chiisana Mu ni); 9. "Bye-bye" (ばいばい, Baibai); 10. "Whither the Confession" (告白の行方, Kokuhaku no Yukue); 11. "Shoulder to Shoulder!" (竜虎並び立つ！, Ryūko Narabi Tatsu); 12. "Restaurant Bomber" (ファミレス・ボンバー, Famiresu Bonbā); 13. "Seductive Model Girl" (魅惑のモデルガール, Miwaku no Moderugāru); 14. "Behind the Angel's Façade" (天使の面の皮, Tenshi no Tsuranokawa); Extra. "Ryuuji and Taiga's Summer Vacation" (竜児と大河のなつやすみ, Ryūji to Taiga no Natsuyasumi)
Minori pulls Taiga and Ryuji aside and gives the two her blessing as a couple; to make it worse, Yusaku joins her in supporting them. Taiga and Ryuji are shocked. After dinner out, Taiga releases Ryuji from serving her. She causes a disruption at school in order to quell the rumors. She then asks Yusaku to meet her after school. Ryuji observes her as Taiga finally confesses her love to Yusaku, but Yusaku reveals she had rejected him a year ago, and that they should be just friends. Afterwards, Ryuji rushes to support Taiga; they agree to continue working together. They frequently visits a family restaurant where Minorin works as a waitress. Ami Kawashima, a popular teen fashion model and Yusaku's childhood friend, visits the place, but while she has a great celebrity personality on the surface, she flirts with Ryuji, and turns cold and mean to Taiga while Ryuji and Yusaku observe from afar. Ami later joins their class as a transfer student. The bonus chapter follows Ryuji and Taiga as they look for a place to stay cool.
3	January 27, 2010	978-4-048683-68-5	October 25, 2011	978-1-935934-05-9
15. "Ryuuji & His Merry Band of Friends?!" (竜児と愉快な仲間たち⁉, Ryūji to yukai na nakamatachi!?); 16. "Oh, This Is Hopeless!" (だめだこちゃ, Dame dakocha); 17. "Pretty Soldier's Secret" (美少女戦土の秘密, Bishōjo sento no himitsu); 18. "In The Name of Meat, I Will Punish You!" (肉にかねつておしきよ, Niku ni kanetsu teoshi kiyo); 19. "The Ultimate Choice" (究極の選択, Kyūkyoku no sentaku); 20. "The Second Great Bento War" (第2次お弁当作戦, Dainiji obentō sakusen); 21. "He's Back" (また来たあいつ, Mata kitāitsu); 22. "Devilish Little Angel" (小悪魔天使, Koakuma tenshi); 23. "The Aftermath" (その後の顚末, Sonogo no temmatsu); 24. "'Scuze Me!" (お邪魔します, Ojamashimasu)
Taiga and Minori are upset that Ryuji is spending time with the flirtatious but secretly mean Ami, even though Ryuji denies they have any sort of relationship. When Ami threatens to ruin Taiga's impression to Kitamura, Taiga becomes despondent and hides in her apartment weeping while Ryuji comforts her. After discovering Ami's junk food habit, Taiga and Minori poke fun of her figure. In order to evade a stalker, Ami solicits Ryuji and Taiga's help, but ends up staying in Taiga's apartment. When Kitamura asks Taiga to be friends with Ami, Taiga reluctantly invites her and the gang to lunch. During a cleanup day at the school, Ami becomes unglued when she soaks her feet in a creek full of tadpoles. When Ami's stalker hits on Taiga, and Taiga reacts violently, Ami joins in and tells him off. Ami admits she has a mean-spirited side, but then asks Ryuji if he would come to like her. Taiga and Yasuko walk in on the seemingly seductive moment.
4	January 27, 2011	978-4-048702-44-7	April 10, 2012	978-1-935934-79-0
25. "Hey, Did You Know The Most Popular Lining Color for School Swimsuits Isn't White But Beige?"; 26. "Boobs, Boobs, Everywhere Boobs"; 27. "Tora Tora Tora"; 28. "Battlefield: Pool"; 29. "Round 2, Fight!!"; 30. "The Dog's Mask"; 31. "Their Feelings"; 32. "Battle! Dumb Chihuahua vs. Palmtop Tiger!!"; 33. "Restaurant Meeting"; 34. "The Journey Begins"; Extra. "This Is A Bromance!"
In order to prepare for the school's swim class, the girls buy new swimsuits. Ryuji fixes Taiga's swimsuit to be bustier. When Ami invites Ryuji to her summer vacation home, Taiga becomes jealous, and the two girls end up challenging each other in a swimming race. Taiga does not know how to swim so she practices with Ryuji. On the day of the race, Ryuji gets elbowed in the head and falls in the pool; Taiga tries to rescue him and declares in front of the class that Ryuji is hers, leading everyone to think they are a couple again. She joins the summer getaway event along with the rest of the gang. She and Ryuji plan some scary situations to have Minori be close to Ryuji. In the bonus chapter, Ryuji and his guy classmates play President; Yusaku loses and has to ask the girls what color panties they wear.
5	March 27, 2012	978-4-048864-92-3	September 4, 2012	978-1-935934-79-0
35. "Exquisite Curry"; 36. "A Night Alone Together"; 37. "A Six-Tatami-Mat Distance"; 38. "Change of Plans"; 39. "Collaboration"; 40. "Forward! The Kitamura Exploration Squad"; 41. "Second Scare"; 42. "In The Dark"; 43. "Final Fright"; 44. "Fireworks"; 45. "The End of Summer"; 46. "Girls Banzai! 𝅘𝅥𝅮"
At Ami's vacation home, Taiga shyly declines a request to shop for groceries with Yusaku so that she and Ryuji can plan places and events to scare Minori into being closer to Ryuji. When Ryuji asks Minori if she has a boyfriend, Minori responds that it is like her belief in ghosts in that she knows it exists but that she has not met the right person to love. Yusaku and Ami join in on the plan to scare Minori; they come up with a test of courage activity where they would populate the cave with scary things. But when Ryuji won't reveal to Ami why he is doing this, Ami refuses to help. As the gang go through the cave, Ami pulls Ryuji aside and questions whether he is compatible with Minori, and that she would be a better choice. The scary things backfire on Ryuji, Ami, and Taiga as it turns out Yusaki and Minori have planned their own scare pranks. They do some fireworks. After returning home, Taiga goes with Ami and her classmates to a nail salon and get made up.
6	July 27, 2013 (special edition); August 27, 2013 (regular edition)	978-4-048916-51-6 (special edition); 978-4-048916-18-9 (regular edition)	February 4, 2014	978-1-937867-72-0
47. "Homeroom Never Ends"; 48. "Papaya"; 49. "Poor Thing"; 50. "It's A Good Thing"; 51. "Please, Please Macaroon"; 52. "Culture Festival Oncoming"; 53. "Having A Strong Jaw Means I'm Manly"; 54. "The Ideal Father"; 55. "Selfish"; Extra. "Taiga's Kitchen / Ryuuji's Kakuni Braised Pork"
Ryuji's class try to decide what to do for the culture festival. They draw from a lottery and end up with a pro wrestling story. When Taiga finds her bank account is empty, she asks Ryuji to meet her father and talk about getting the money for her living expenses back. Taiga's father wants to reunite with Taiga now that he has planned to divorce his second wife. When Ryuji tells Taiga about this and wants her to consider it, Taiga gets upset. Haruta writes a story that pits Ami and the class against Ryuji and Taiga. When Taiga meets her father, she kicks him in the groin and storms off but Ryuji convinces her to return. Taiga tries to swap roles with Ami so she can be the heroine in the play. Ami agrees as long as she gets to meet him, but when Minori gets word of it, she becomes upset, and tells Ryuji not to trust him. This is later affirmed when during the beauty contest, Ryuji gets a message from Taiga's father that he is not attending the show and has given up on the idea of reuniting.
7	February 27, 2015	978-4048690-57-7	June 30, 2015	978-1-626920-96-5
56. "Alone"; 57. "Mr. Festival"; 58. "It All Starts At The Finish Line"; 59. "The Two In The Picture"; 60. "You Look Stupid"; 61. "I Want To Know"; 62. "Orion"; 63. "Stupid"; 64. "Not Stupid"; Extra. "I Want to Eat Cake!!"
Despite Taiga's father not showing up, Taiga wins the Ms. Festival pageant although Ryuji thinks it was because they felt sorry for her. Kanou directs the Mr. Festival event where the boys must navigate an obstacle course but she announces several prizes including getting the first dance from Taiga and giving out all her school notes. Ryuji tries his best but then Minori joins in the race; together they overcome the others and win the contest. Later Kitamura gets upset to the point that he quits student council. Then he bleaches his hair and starts missing school. Ryuji and friends try to help him and eventually discover that he has been upset that Kanou is going to leave the school prior to graduation and before he has a chance to tell her his feelings.
8	October 27, 2017	978-4-048934-26-8	September 11, 2018	978-1-626923-71-3
65. "The Student Council Election"; 66. "Kanou Sumire"; 67. "Angel"; 68. "Let's Be Good Girls"; 69. "A Christmas Party!"; 70. "Something Fishy"; 71. "Playing House"; 72. "A Good Girl's Santa Claus"; 73. "As Many Times as It Takes"; Extra. Untitled
9	June 27, 2019	978-4-049125-84-9	August 18, 2020	978-1-645052-43-2
74. "Merry Christmas!"; 75. "Santa Claus"; 76. "Dreams & Reality"; 77. "I Don't Need to See"; 78. "Two Fools"; 79. "Life Doesn't Always Go the Way You Want!"; 80. "Catch Him"; 81. "Stay This Way"; Extra. "A Little Side Story Between Chapters 77 & 78"
10	November 26, 2021	978-4-049140-83-5	December 6, 2022	978-1-648275-55-5
82. "The School Trip"; 83. "We're Busting In!"; 84. "I Hate You, I Hate You, I Hate You"; 85. "If We Could Turn Back Time"; 86. "Frozen Chahan Rice and Ten Days' Recovery"; 87. "Paths Forward"; 88. "It'll Be All Right"; Extra. "Girls' Ramen Diet Club"
11	January 26, 2023	978-4-049148-31-2	December 19, 2023	979-8-88843-036-1
89. "What We Want to Do"; 90. "Too Late"; 91. "Get It Together!"; 92. "My First Part-Time Job"; 93. "You Just Don't Get It"; 94. "Valentines"; 95. "Forever"; 96. "Time's Up"; 97. "Take My Hand"; Extra. "Let's Mystery Hot Pot! ☆"
12	April 27, 2026	978-4-04-952200-6	April 27, 2027	979-8-89160-671-5

== See also ==
- List of Toradora! episodes
