= Hanbun no Tsuki ga Noboru Sora =

Japanese light novel series

- Hanbun no Tsuki ga Noboru Sora light novel volume 1 cover

半分の月がのぼる空
- Genre: Drama, romance
- Light novel
- Written by: Tsumugu Hashimoto
- Illustrated by: Keiji Yamamoto
- Published by: MediaWorks
- Imprint: Dengeki Bunko
- Magazine: Dengeki hp
- Original run: October 10, 2003 – August 10, 2006
- Volumes: 8
- Manga
- Written by: B.Tarō
- Published by: MediaWorks
- Magazine: Dengeki Comic Gao!
- Original run: August 27, 2005 – November 27, 2006
- Volumes: 2
- Anime television series
- Directed by: Yukihiro Matsushita
- Produced by: Kenjirō Kawando (Animation); Tatsuya Ishiguro
- Written by: Katsuhiko Takayama
- Music by: Shinkichi Mitsumune
- Studio: Group TAC
- Licensed by: AUS: Bost Digital Entertainment; NA: Nozomi Entertainment
- Original network: WOWOW
- Original run: January 12, 2006 – February 23, 2006
- Episodes: 6
- Television drama
- Directed by: Masato Inbe; Akira Hibino; Mitsutaka Endō; Masatoshi Tōjō
- Produced by: Masaru Kariya; Takashi Izuhara
- Written by: Yuriko Kodama
- Studio: MediaWorks
- Original network: TV Tokyo
- Original run: October 3, 2006 – December 26, 2006
- Episodes: 13
- Live-action film
- Directed by: Yoshihiro Fukagawa
- Produced by: Hiroshi Kogure; Ryōsuke Mameoka; Yūichi Shibahara
- Written by: Masafumi Nishida
- Music by: Mamiko Hirai; 5to4
- Released: April 3, 2010
- Runtime: 119 minutes

Hanbun no Tsuki ga Noboru Sora (半分の月がのぼる空; lit. Sky with a Rising Half-Moon), subtitled Looking up at the Half-Moon, is a Japanese romance light novel series written by Tsumugu Hashimoto and illustrated by Keiji Yamamoto centering on two hospitalized seventeen year olds and the love they begin to share. The series was originally serialized in MediaWorks' now-defunct light novel magazine Dengeki hp and spanned eight volumes released between October 2003 and August 2006.

An anime series was adapted from the novels and aired in Japan on the WOWOW television network between January 12 and February 23, 2006, with six episodes. A manga series by B.Tarō was serialized in MediaWorks' shōnen manga magazine Dengeki Comic Gao! between August 2005 and November 2006; two volumes were released. A set of five drama CDs were produced between October 2006 and August 2007 by Wayuta. A live-action drama of the series was aired on TV Tokyo between October and December 2006, and a live-action film premiered in Japanese theaters in April 2010.

== Plot ==
The story of Hantsuki focuses on the budding relationship between the seventeen year old Yūichi Ezaki and Rika Akiba. They are hospitalized in Yūichi's home town for their conditions. Yūichi has hepatitis A, while Rika has problems with a weak heart valve. These teens then fall in love while they spend time with one another. The story is based in Ise, Mie prefecture.

== Characters ==
Yūichi (left) and Rika (right) in the anime series

=== Hospital patients ===
Yūichi Ezaki (戎崎 裕一, Ezaki Yūichi)
Voiced by: Kenichi Suzumura; played by: Atsushi Hashimoto (TV Series), Sosuke Ikematsu (Film)
A seventeen-year-old high school student who is hospitalized for hepatitis A. He notices a beautiful girl, Rika, in the east wing of the hospital and is later encouraged by the nurse Akiko to befriend her. Within minutes Yūichi enrages Rika by lying about having read her favorite book, but Rika offers to forgive Yūichi if he were to obey her wishes. Eager to gain that forgiveness, he agrees. As they spend time together, Yūichi begins to fall in love with Rika.
Rika Akiba (秋庭 里香, Akiba Rika)
Voiced by: Mikako Takahashi; played by: Miku Ishida (TV Series), Shiori Kutsuna (Film)
Rika is a seventeen-year-old girl who has been hospitalized for most of her life due to a weak heart valve that also affected her father and ultimately killed him. Due to this prolonged hospitalization, she is without friends and spends her time reading books by her favorite author, Ryūnosuke Akutagawa. She has a close relationship with Dr. Natsume, which is a source of tension in her relationship with Yūichi.
Yoshizō Tada (多田 吉蔵, Tada Yoshizō)
Voiced by: Kōji Yada
A perverted old man who has an enormous pornography collection that he amassed during his stay in the hospital. He advises Yūichi to go after Rika if he loves her, because he will later regret it if he does not. Tada then says that he was stupid and lived a life of painful regret because he did not go after the person that he loved. Upon his sudden death, he offers his last will to Akiko, which is to pass his porno collection on to Yūichi.

=== Hospital staff ===
Akiko Tanizaki (谷崎 亜希子, Tanizaki Akiko)
Voiced by: Yuki Kodaira; played by: Yoshino Kimika (TV series), Mari Hamada (film)
The nurse who tends to Yūichi. She acts much like an elder sister to Yuichi and will not hesitate to hit him or make fun of him when he deserves it, and even beats him up when he is being seduced by her friend Misako. She is highly manipulative and nosey when it comes to Yuichi but has her tender moments and truly cares about her patients. She particularly cares about the relationship between Yūichi and Rika because she understands that Rika might not have much time to live.
Gorō Natsume (夏目 吾郎, Natsume Gorō)
Voiced by: Hiroaki Hirata; played by: Kohki Okada (TV series), Yo Oizumi (film)
The doctor who is in charge of Rika's care. He used to take care of her at another hospital but was transferred to Ise. Rika then transferred to the same hospital so that he could still be her physician. He harbors some feelings for Rika and tries to sabotage Rika and Yūichi's relationship. He went to the hospital drunk one day and he assaults Yuichi who said he was jealous. Natsume is doing this because his wife died from a condition similar to that of Rika, and does not want Yūichi to experience the same thing.

=== Yūichi's friends ===
Tsukasa Sekoguchi (世古口 司, Sekoguchi Tsukasa)
Voiced by: Nobuyuki Kobushi; played by: Takuya Nakayama (TV series), Ryosuke Kawamura (film)
He comes to visit him occasionally and helps him with secret missions that will help Yūichi's relationship with Rika. During these missions, he wears a Zebra Mask to hide his identity and give him a sense of strength.
Tamotsu Yamanishi (山西 保, Yamanishi Tamotsu)
Voiced by: Akira Sasanuma; played by: Shingo Nakagawa
He visits Yūichi when he finds out about his inheritance of the porno collection. This ultimately gets Yūichi in trouble with Rika.
Miyuki Mizutani (水谷 みゆき, Mizutani Miyuki)
Voiced by: Yuki Matsuoka; played by: Takayo Kashiwagi (TV Series), Yurie Midori (Film)
She loans a school uniform to Rika and takes her around the school. She asks Rika about her condition numerous times.

== Media ==
=== Light novels ===
The series began as a light novel series written by Tsumugu Takahashi with illustrations by Keiji Yamamoto that was first serialized in the Japanese light novel magazine Dengeki hp. There were eight volumes released between October 10, 2003, and August 10, 2006. The novels were published by MediaWorks under their Dengeki Bunko light novel label.

=== Manga ===
A manga illustrated by B. Tarō based on the novel was serialized in the Japanese manga magazine Dengeki Comic Gao! between August 27, 2005, and November 27, 2006, published by MediaWorks. Two bound volumes were later released, the first on February 27, 2006, and the second on December 16, 2006. The volumes are published by MediaWorks under their Dengeki Comics label.

=== Anime ===
A short anime adaptation aired in Japan between January 12 and February 23, 2006; there were six episodes. The anime was produced by the Japanese animation studio Group TAC and was aired on the WOWOW television network. Three DVDs were originally released, each containing two episodes, between April 19 and June 21, 2006. The premium DVD box set containing the six episodes was released on January 16, 2008. The anime has been licensed by Japanese-based company Bost Digital Entertainment for distribution through their video streaming website Bost TV. The episodes are available only to Australia and New Zealand for the price of US$1.99 per episode. Crimson Star Media licensed the anime for a North American release in September 2013, however, the release was canceled following the prison sentence of Corey Maddox, who was in charge of the company. The series was later re-licensed by Lucky Penny, a division of Right Stuf Inc.

==== Episodes ====
No.	Title	Original release date
1	"Akiko-san, the Girl and Ryūnosuke Akutagawa"; Transliteration: "Akiko-san to Shōjo to Akutagawa Ryuunosuke" (Japanese: 亜希子さんと少女と芥川龍之介)	January 12, 2006
Yūichi constantly sneaks out at night and, to cut his habit, his nurse Akiko barricades his door to prevent him from leaving. However, she strikes a deal that if he is able to become friends with a new patient, she will lift her restriction. The new patient turns out to be Rika, a seventeen-year-old girl in the eastern ward who enjoys reading the works of Ryūnosuke Akutagawa. At first, Yūichi, with the assistance of Akiko, lies about reading the same book, but Rika easily sees through this act and demands that in exchange for her forgiveness, he must do what she wants. One day, Rika requests to go up to Mount Hōdai despite her weak, sickly condition because it was the same place her father hiked up before he died. She believed if she is able to do the same, she will lose her fear of dying. Yūichi sneaks her out of the hospital with much success and realizes that he is doing favors not because she tells him to, and when he tries to tell her his true intent of assisting her, he faints.
2	"The Inheritance of the Tada Collection"; Transliteration: "Tada Korekushon no Sōzoku" (Japanese: 多田コレクションの相続)	January 26, 2006
Earlier, Tada had died and left Yūichi all of his pornographic magazines in his will. Rika discovers this secret and becomes furious. Although Yūichi becomes remorseful and searches for opportunities to apologize to her, Rika only responds with pranks and resentful actions. After Rika locks Yūichi on the hospital roof, he falls ill and becomes a patient of Dr. Natsume, who had recently returned from a vacation. When Yūichi recovers, Akiko creates an opportunity for him to apologize. However, while waiting, he encounters Dr. Natsume and learns that he had been treating Rika for six years and only transferred to the hospital to keep watch of her. Dr. Natsume is surprised that Rika had told Yūichi about her illness since she had never done so in the past, nor had she ever made a friend. He gives Yūichi a pornographic magazine, and Rika catches him perusing through the magazine and again locks him outside; meanwhile, Akiko realizes that Dr. Natsume had purposely caused this because he found it "entertaining". Eventually, Rika and Yūichi get back on friendlier terms, but Yūichi becomes offended when Rika states that the only reason she wanted to apologize was because of Dr. Natsume's influence. In response, he harshly expresses his contempt of the doctor, and Rika throws her book at him. The book turns out to be both her father's and her prized possession, and lands on the top of a window.
3	"The End of the Ezaki Collection"; Transliteration: "Ezaki Korekushon no Shūen~Soshite" (Japanese: 戎崎コレクションの終焉〜そして)	February 2, 2006
With the help of his friend Tsukasa, Yūichi is able to rescue the book from the rain, but consequently develops a fever. He dreams that he and Rika reconcile — which turns out to be real, as Rika visits his room in his feverish state. When Yūichi recovers from his illness, Dr. Natsume sees him burning all of the pornography Tada had left him. Yūichi explains that Rika will only forgive him if he burns the "Tada Collection", and Dr. Natsume becomes quite surprised of how the two are getting along so well. The next time Yūichi visits Rika, she lends him Night on the Galactic Railroad; meanwhile, Dr. Natsume shares a recent discovery to Rika's mother that Rika's condition is growing worse. When night falls, Yūichi finds a drunk Dr. Natsume who tells him that his friendship with Rika will not last. Yūichi accuses Dr. Natsume of jealousy, but Dr. Natsume only assaults him physically. Later, Yūichi reads Night on the Galactic Railroad again and reads about Campanella, Rika's "character", dying. Through this, he discovers why Dr. Natsume was angry and mourns over the destiny that would await Rika.
4	"A Single Day of School Life"; Transliteration: "Ichinichi Dake no Sukūru Raifu" (Japanese: 一日だけのスクールライフ)	February 9, 2006
Since Rika expresses her desire to have her photos taken, Yūichi and Akiko return to Yūichi's house to find a camera. As Yūichi is taking photos of Rika, she asks him about school. Rika expresses envy that Yūichi is able to go to school while she has never been to one in her life. Yūichi receives an idea that just for one day, the two could pretend Rika is going to school. With the help of Yūichi's friends, Rika borrows a schoolgirl's uniform and enters school grounds; however, a teacher catches them. Rika realizes that Yūichi may end up in trouble, but the boys have already knocked the teacher unconscious. In a classroom, Rika tells Miyuki that she is not afraid of dying, but makes her keep it a secret from Yūichi. Upon their return to the hospital, Rika and Yūichi get into trouble and are punished. While sitting out their punishment together, Rika gives Yūichi a book titled Les Thibault and orders him not to read it until she tells him to. When Yūichi speaks plans of observing the flowers blooming, Rika suddenly falls unconscious.
5	"One Frozen Minute"; Transliteration: "Tomerareta Ippun" (Japanese: とめられた一分)	February 16, 2006
Rika is admitted into the intensive care unit, and Yūichi is only able to see her for one minute in secret. Dazed and depressed, Yūichi encounters Akiko's friend, Misako, who immediately seduces him. Fortunately, Akiko quickly figures out her doings and angrily beats up Yūichi and punches Misako. She notifies him that he must never tell Rika about this event or else Rika's condition will falter more. The next day, Dr. Natsume comforts Yūichi on the hospital roof, understanding his situation seeing as he was put into a similar one when his wife was dying of cardiomyopathy. Dr. Natsume is practicing for the operation and tells Yūichi that out of all the years he had known Rika, this was the first time Rika had been earnest about receiving the operation. Before Rika's operation, she tells him that Yūichi is able to read Les Thibault. While patiently waiting for her operation to be over, Akiko tells Yūichi that the reason why Rika brought up the idea of photos was because Akiko had shown her a photo of Yūichi. Rika had it taped to her leg as a luck charm. Eventually, Yūichi reads Les Thibault, and ultimately discovers a parallel from the ending of the book—it is Rika's confession of love to him. She says that she would risk her life through operation for a chance to be with him.
6	"Our Two Hands"; Transliteration: "Bokutachi no Ryōte wa" (Japanese: 僕たちの両手は)	February 23, 2006
Rika's surgery is over and she is well enough to return to the eastern ward. However, Yūichi is forbidden to see her again. Dr. Natsume reminds Yūichi that while he has a future, Rika may not, and soon Yūichi may have to choose between his dreams and Rika. Later, Dr. Natsume tells Yūichi that he can do anything he wants, helping Rika included, but confides to Akiko that he had blinded Yūichi with this optimism. He shares the fate of his wife's life and mentions that he was once pitted in a situation in which he had to choose between her or his work, and he does not want Yūichi to suffer under the same circumstances. Secretly, Yūichi overhears their conversation and decides that no matter what, he will stay by Rika. With the help of his friends, he enters Rika's room despite warnings in order to promise her that he will always be with her. At the same time, Akiko asks Dr. Natsume if his happiness is more important than that of his loved one. She goes on to say that, "Rika smiles and laughs now. It is better for Rika to be happy with Yūichi than for her to go back to the way she was before she met him." After the credits, Yūichi and Rika are shown going back to Mount Hōdai whereupon Yūichi promises to cherish Rika and the two share a kiss.

=== Music and audio CDs ===
The anime's opening theme was "Aoi Kōfuku" and the ending theme was "Kioku no Kakera"; both songs were sung by Nobuko and written and composed by Macado. The maxi single containing the opening and ending themes was released on February 15, 2006. The Hanbun no Tsuki ga Noboru Sora Original Soundtrack for the anime version was released on March 15, 2006. The live action drama's opening theme was "Endless Loop" (エンドレス·ループ, Endoresu Rūpu), sung by Sacra, and the ending theme was "Sunshine Of Your Love" by I-lulu. A set of five drama CDs based on the series were released between October 4, 2006, and August 24, 2007, produced by Wayuta.

=== TV drama ===
A live-action television drama adaptation ran on TV Tokyo from October 3 to December 26, 2006, containing thirteen episodes. A DVD boxset was later released on February 23, 2007. Hanbun no Tsuki ga Noboru Sora was the first novel series under Dengeki Bunko to receive a TV drama adaptation.

=== Film ===
A live-action film was released on April 3, 2010. Directed by Yoshihiro Fukagawa, the film starred Sosuke Ikematsu and Shiori Kutsuna. It was shot on location in places in Mie Prefecture. The theme song is "15 no Kotoba" by singer-songwriter Mao Abe.
