= Takemiya =

Takemiya may refer to:

- Keiko Takemiya Japanese manga artist
- Yuyuko Takemiya Japanese writer
