= Mangirl! =

Japanese manga and anime

- Cover of Mangirl! volume 1.

まんがーる! (Mangāru!)
- Genre: Comedy
- Manga
- Written by: Kagari Tamaoka
- Published by: Earth Star Entertainment
- Magazine: Comic Earth Star
- Original run: April 2011 – July 2013
- Volumes: 3
- Anime television series
- Directed by: Nobuaki Nakanishi
- Written by: Reiko Yoshida
- Studio: Doga Kobo
- Licensed by: NA: Crunchyroll
- Original network: Tokyo MX, Sun TV, ATX, Niconico
- Original run: January 2, 2013 – March 27, 2013
- Episodes: 13 + OVA

Mangirl! (まんがーる!, Mangāru!; portmanteau of "manga" and "girl") is a Japanese four-panel comic strip manga series written and illustrated by Kagari Tamaoka. It was serialized in Earth Star Entertainment's Comic Earth Star magazine between the April 2011 and July 2013 issues. An anime television series adaptation by Doga Kobo aired between January and March 2013 in Japan.

== Media ==
=== Manga ===
Originally titled Sōkan! Comic Earth Star Henshū-bu (創刊! コミック アース・スター編集部, Sōkan! Komikku Āsu Sutā Henshū-bu; Launch! Comic Earth Star Editors), Mangirl! is a four-panel comic strip manga written and illustrated by Kagari Tamaoka, with original character designs by Yasu. It was serialized in Earth Star Entertainment's Comic Earth Star magazine between the April 2011 and July 2013 issues. Three tankōbon volumes were released between May 12, 2012, and March 12, 2013.

=== Internet radio show ===
An internet radio show to promote the manga titled Sōkan! Comic Earth Star Henshū-bu (創刊! コミック アース・スター編集部, Sōkan! Komikku Āsu Sutā Henshū-bu; Launch! Comic Earth Star Editors) aired for 18 episodes between August 16 and December 13, 2010. An additional special episode was broadcast on March 11, 2011. It was hosted by Mai Nakahara, Kana Ueda, Saori Hayami, and Sayuri Yahagi. The show was streamed online every Monday and produced by the Japanese Internet radio station Hibiki.

=== Anime ===
An anime television series adaptation animated by Doga Kobo aired between January 2 and March 27, 2013, in Japan on Tokyo MX, Sun TV, ATX, and Niconico. The anime was simulcast by Crunchyroll. An additional unaired 14th episode came bundled with the Blu-ray Disc release of the series on May 24, 2013.

==== Episode list ====
No.	Title	Original release date
1	"This Is Comic Earth Star's Editorial Department"; Transliteration: "Kochira Komikku āsu Sutā Henshū-bu" (こちらコミック アース・スター編集部)	January 2, 2013
2	"Everyday Editor"; Transliteration: "Mainichi Henshū-sha" (毎日編集者)	January 9, 2013
3	"Perfect Day for a Gravure Shoot"; Transliteration: "Gurabia Satsuei Biyori" (グラビア撮影日和)	January 16, 2013
4	"Assistant Girls"; Transliteration: "Ashisutan to no Jō (Ashisutanto Gāruzu)" (あしすたんとの嬢(アシスタントガールズ))	January 23, 2013
5	"Phototypesetting Midnight"; Transliteration: "Shashoku Middonaito" (写植ミッドナイト)	January 30, 2013
6	"Infinite Proofreading"; Transliteration: "Mugen no Kōsei" (無限の校正)	February 6, 2013
7	"Impatient Ryoma Road"; Transliteration: "Kimijika Ryōma Rōdo" (きみじか龍馬(リョーマ)ロード)	February 13, 2013
8	"Comisuke Planet"; Transliteration: "Komisuke no Hoshi" (コミスケの星)	February 20, 2013
9	"Something Borrowed"; Transliteration: "Azukarimon" (あずかりもん)	February 27, 2013
10	"Buy More"; Transliteration: "Motto Kattekūre" (もっとカッテクーレ)	March 6, 2013
11	"We Just Haven't Given Our All Yet"; Transliteration: "Watashi-tachi wa Mada Honkidashitenai Dake" (私たちはまだ本気出してないだけ)	March 13, 2013
12	"The First Volume"; Transliteration: "Hajimete no Ichi-kan" (はじめの一巻)	March 20, 2013
13	"It's Anime Time"; Transliteration: "Anime da V!" (アニメだV！)	March 27, 2013
14	"Playing With Friends"; Transliteration: "Yūbuhenshuugaaru" (遊ブへんしゅうがぁる)	May 24, 2013
