= Golden Time (novel series) =

Japanese light novel series

- Golden Time light novel volume 1 cover

ゴールデンタイム (Gōruden Taimu)
- Genre: Romantic drama
- Light novel
- Written by: Yuyuko Takemiya
- Illustrated by: Eiji Komatsu
- Published by: ASCII Media Works
- Imprint: Dengeki Bunko
- Magazine: Dengeki Bunko Magazine
- Original run: September 10, 2010 – March 8, 2014
- Volumes: 11 (Note: This includes eight main novels and three side story collections.)
- Manga
- Written by: Yuyuko Takemiya
- Illustrated by: Umechazuke
- Published by: ASCII Media Works
- English publisher: NA: Seven Seas Entertainment
- Magazine: Dengeki Daioh
- Original run: October 2011 – July 2016
- Volumes: 9
- Anime television series
- Directed by: Chiaki Kon
- Written by: Fumihiko Shimo
- Music by: Yukari Hashimoto
- Studio: J.C.Staff
- Licensed by: AUS: Madman Entertainment; NA: Sentai Filmworks; UK: Animatsu Entertainment (former); Anime Limited (current)
- Original network: MBS, Tokyo MX, CTC, tvk, TV Saitama, TV Aichi, BS11, AT-X
- English network: SEA: Animax Asia
- Original run: October 3, 2013 – March 27, 2014
- Episodes: 24
- Video game

Golden Time: Vivid Memories
- Developer: Konami
- Publisher: Kadokawa Games; ASCII Media Works
- Genre: Visual novel
- Platform: PlayStation Vita
- Released: JP: March 27, 2014
- icon

Golden Time (ゴールデンタイム, Gōruden Taimu) is a Japanese light novel series written by Yuyuko Takemiya, with illustrations by Eiji Komatsu. The series includes 11 volumes (eight main series novels, plus three extras) published by ASCII Media Works between September 10, 2010, and March 10, 2014, and incorporates romantic comedy and supernatural themes. A manga adaptation by Umechazuke began serialization in the October 2011 issue of Dengeki Daioh. A 24-episode anime adaptation by J.C.Staff aired on MBS between October 2013 and March 2014.

== Plot ==
Banri Tada is a newly admitted male student at a private law school in Tokyo. Due to the after-effects of a fall from a bridge shortly after his high school graduation, he has lost all of his memories prior to the accident (retrograde amnesia).

Banri finds himself completely and utterly lost after the big opening ceremonial event and tries to find his way to the freshman orientation. Along the way, he runs straight into another lost and confused freshman from the same school, Mitsuo Yanagisawa, and they immediately hit it off. Somehow arriving at their intended goal just in time, there appears in front of them a beautiful girl holding a bouquet of roses, who congratulates Mitsuo on getting into the school then hits him across the face with them before tossing the bouquet into his lap and leaving. This stylish, well dressed, and obsessive woman is revealed to be Mitsuo's childhood friend, Koko Kaga. As children, they had promised to marry each other one day, something she has taken to heart this entire time. Mitsuo had gone out secretly and taken the examination for this private college in order to escape from her, but she used her connections to find out about it and enrolled in the college herself.

Banri meets a second-year student named Linda; unbeknownst to him, she was his best friend in high school, and holds herself responsible for his memory loss. As the series progresses, Banri deals with his slowly re-emerging memories, which often come into conflict with a relationship that blooms between him and Kaga.

== Characters ==
Banri Tada (多田 万里, Tada Banri)
Voiced by: Makoto Furukawa (Japanese); Mike Haimoto (English)
Banri is a freshman studying law in a private university in Tokyo. His hometown is in Shizuoka Prefecture, and he now lives alone in a small apartment. The day after his third-year high school graduation ceremony, he fell from a bridge, and now suffers from severe retrograde amnesia, unable to remember anything from before the accident. He missed the college entrance exam and one year of school because of his hospitalization. He later meets Kōko Kaga, and falls in love with her.
Banri's Spirit (万里の霊魂, Banri no Reikon)
Declaring himself to have died at 18 years of age, he is a being seeming to be Banri's spirit. He possesses his memories from before the accident. Without anybody noticing, he has followed after Banri and has been watching over things especially how Banri always focuses on Kōko when the spirit is still in love with Linda.
Kōko Kaga (加賀 香子, Kaga Kōko)
Voiced by: Yui Horie (Japanese); Christina Kelly (English)
Kōko is a freshman law student at Banri's university. She is extremely popular among boys, but has few friends, due to people being intimidated and scared to talk to her because of her beauty. To all appearances, she is the perfect lady. Since elementary school, she has been obsessed with Mitsuo, her childhood friend, to the point of stalking him and exhibiting symptoms of borderline personality disorder. In time, she made a promise to marry Mitsuo, and ever since then she has been making her plans so everything would come out perfect. After Mitsuo breaks up with her, she starts spending more time with Banri where she falls in love with him and they eventually start dating.
Mitsuo Yanagisawa (柳澤 光央, Yanagisawa Mitsuo)
Voiced by: Kaito Ishikawa (Japanese); Adam Gibbs (English)
Mitsuo is a freshman studying law attending the same university as Banri. After the entrance ceremony, heading for freshman orientation, he gets lost on the campus, and meets and befriends Banri. Banri calls him "Yana-san" (ヤナっさん). He has been the target of Kōko's obsessive, one-sided affection since their elementary school years. He secretly took the exam to this university in an attempt to escape from her. He lives alone in an apartment three train stops away from Banri's. Mitsuo has a crush on Chinami Oka and he even confessed to her at a party, only to be rejected. She thought it was an alcohol-fueled joke. He later becomes romantically interested in Linda.
Linda (リンダ, Rinda) / Nana Hayashida (林田 奈々, Hayashida Nana)
Voiced by: Ai Kayano (Japanese); Melissa Molano (English)
Linda is a second-year student and member of the Japanese Festival Culture Research Society. Leaving out the details, she invites Banri and Kōko to join. She and Banri were best friends in high school, and Banri was in love with her. Although he has no memory of her, she was the reason he was on the bridge he fell from, waiting for her to either reject or accept his love with "yes" or "no". She still has feelings for Banri when she met him, but she has enormous guilt towards Banri's accident causing him to lose memories. She even tells him it was already too late for her to reach him and save him by holding his hands tight. When Banri asks her what message she wants him to deliver, Linda talks about supporting him to do his best, yet she adds she must not talk this way and therefore changing what she wants to tell him afterwards. However, Banri currently doesn't remember her final words.
Nijigen (二次元; lit. "2D") / Takaya Satō (佐藤 隆哉, Satō Takaya)
Voiced by: Takahiro Hikami (Japanese); Gareth West (English)
Nijigen is a freshman and Banri's friend. He gains his nickname at the tea ceremony club's welcoming party after declaring his despair of the three-dimensional world and he would live for the two-dimensional world from then on. His nickname in high school was "Taka Satō". He plays a prominent role in the final stages of the story, where he helps Banri and Kōko get back together as he doesn't want to lose his best friend.
Chinami Oka (岡 千波, Oka Chinami)
Voiced by: Ibuki Kido (Japanese); Caitlynn French (English)
Chinami is a female student and a member of the Film Research Society. Chinami is the object of Mitsuo's affection, and he confessed to her at a party, but she turned him down by later saying it "doesn't count as a real confession." She is despised by Kōko, although she knows Kōko actually doesn't want to admit Chinami is now a friend because of her pride. She is later shown to be always approached by Kōko as if the two girls are best friends already. Later, she has her hair cut short like Linda's hairstyle since she wants Mitsuo to see her more like Linda. But she immediately regrets it after realizing how much it changed her appearance and it fails to get Mitsuo to notice her. She falls in love with Mitsuo after realizing he has feelings for Linda, but never confesses to him due to her foolishness and it goes unrequited.
Kosshii (コッシー, Kosshii)
Voiced by: Takayuki Kondo (Japanese); Courtland Johnson (English)
Kosshii is a third-year college senior and is the president of the Japanese Festival Culture Research Society.
Nana
Voiced by: Satomi Satō (Japanese); Kira Vincent-Davis (English)
Nana is a third-year female student and Banri's neighbor. She plays in a band and acts similarly to the character of the same name in the manga Nana.

== Media ==
=== Light novels ===
Golden Time began as a light novel series written by Yuyuko Takemiya, with illustrations by Ēji Komatsu. ASCII Media Works published 11 novels between September 10, 2010, and March 8, 2014, under their Dengeki Bunko imprint; eight comprise the main story, while the other three are side story collections. Portions of the series have also been serialized in Dengeki Bunko Magazine.

No.	Title	Release date	ISBN
1	Golden Time 1: A Blackout in Spring; Golden Time 1: Haru ni Shite Blackout (ゴールデンタイム1 春にしてブラックアウト)	September 10, 2010	978-4-04-868878-9
2	Golden Time 2: The Answer is Yes; Golden Time 2: Kotae wa Yes (ゴールデンタイム2 答えはYes)	March 10, 2011	978-4-04-870381-9
3	Golden Time 3: Masquerade; Golden Time 3: Kamen Butōkai (ゴールデンタイム3 仮面舞踏会)	August 10, 2011	978-4-04-870735-0
4	Golden Time 4: Contrarily Don't Look Back; Golden Time 4: Urahara Naru Don't Look Back (ゴールデンタイム4 裏腹なるdon't look back)	March 10, 2012	978-4-04-886546-3
–	Golden Time Spin-off: 2D-kun Special; Golden Time Gaiden: Nijigen-kun Special (ゴールデンタイム外伝 二次元くんスペシャル)	June 10, 2012	978-4-04-886631-6
5	Golden Time 5: The Ghost of Summer, Japanese Summer; Golden Time 5: Onryo no Natsu Nihon no Natsu (ゴールデンタイム5 ONRYOの夏 日本の夏)	September 10, 2012	978-4-04-886897-6
–	Golden Time Extra: We're Still Smiling in the Summer 100 Years Later; Golden Time Bangai: Hyakunen-go no Natsu mo Atashitachi wa Waratteru (ゴールデンタイム番外 百年後の夏もあたしたちは笑ってる)	January 10, 2013	978-4-04-891324-9
6	Golden Time 6: To Memories of Other Lives; Golden Time 6: Kono Yo no Hoka no Omoide ni (ゴールデンタイム6 この世のほかの思い出に)	April 10, 2013	978-4-04-891557-1
–	Golden Time Spin-off: Africa; Golden Time Retsuden: Africa (ゴールデンタイム列伝 AFRICA)	August 10, 2013	978-4-04-891858-9
7	Golden Time 7: I'll Be Back (ゴールデンタイム7 I'll Be Back)	October 10, 2013	978-4-04-866059-4
8	Golden Time 8: Winter Trip; Golden Time 8: Fuyu no Tabi ((ゴールデンタイム8 冬の旅))	March 8, 2014	978-4-04-866414-1

=== Manga ===
A manga adaptation illustrated by Umechazuke was serialized in ASCII Media Works' Dengeki Daioh magazine from the October 2011 to the July 2016 issues. ASCII Media Works published nine tankōbon volumes from March 27, 2012, to September 27, 2016. Seven Seas Entertainment published the series in North America from October 2015 to January 2018.

No.	Original release date	Original ISBN	English release date	English ISBN
1	March 27, 2012	978-4-04-886494-7	October 27, 2015	978-1-626921-88-7
2	September 27, 2012	978-4-04-891022-4	January 19, 2016	978-1-626921-9-31
3	March 27, 2013	978-4-04-891456-7	April 12, 2016	978-1-626922-5-63
4	July 27, 2013	978-4-04-891767-4	July 26, 2016	978-1-626922-86-0
5	January 27, 2014	978-4-04-866236-9	October 4, 2016	978-1-626923-39-3
6	June 27, 2014	978-4-04-866704-3	January 10, 2017	978-1-626923-83-6
7	December 20, 2014	978-4-04-869130-7	May 23, 2017	978-1-626924-81-9
8	July 27, 2015	978-4-04-865218-6	September 5, 2017	978-1-626924-94-9
9	September 27, 2016	978-4-04-892372-9	January 23, 2018	978-1-626926-72-1

=== Anime ===
A 24-episode anime television series adaptation, produced by Genco and J.C.Staff, aired between October 3, 2013 and March 27, 2014, on MBS. The series is directed by Chiaki Kon with scripts by Fumihiko Shimo and character design by Shinya Hasegawa. The series' music is composed by Yukari Hashimoto. For the first 12 episodes, the opening theme is "Golden Time" and the ending theme is "Sweet & Sweet Cherry". From episode 13 onwards, the opening theme is "The♡World's♡End" and the ending theme is "Han'eikyūteki ni Aishite yo♡" (半永久的に愛してよ♡; "Love Me Temporarily♡"); all four songs are sung by Yui Horie. The series is being released on eight BD/DVD compilation volumes between December 25, 2013, and July 23, 2014. The anime has been licensed by Sentai Filmworks for streaming and home video release in 2014. Sentai re-released the series with an English dub on December 17, 2019.

=== Visual novel ===
A visual novel developed by Kadokawa Games, titled Golden Time: Vivid Memories, was released for the PlayStation Vita on March 27, 2014. The game received a Famitsu review score of 32/40.

== Reception ==
The Mainichi Shimbun reported in March 2013 that over 710,000 copies of the light novel series have been sold in Japan.
