= Evergreen (manga) =

Japanese manga series

- Cover of the first Japanese volume

エバーグリーン (Ebāgurīn)
- Genre: Romantic comedy
- Manga
- Written by: Yuyuko Takemiya
- Illustrated by: Akira Kasukabe
- Published by: ASCII Media Works
- English publisher: Seven Seas Entertainment
- Magazine: Dengeki Daioh Genesis; Monthly Comic Dengeki Daioh
- Original run: July 19, 2011 – May 27, 2015
- Volumes: 4

Evergreen (Japanese: エバーグリーン, Hepburn: Ebāgurīn) is a Japanese romantic comedy shōnen manga series written by Yuyuko Takemiya and illustrated by Akira Kasukabe. Published by ASCII Media Works, it is serialized since July 19, 2011, first on Dengeki Daioh Genesis magazine and later on Monthly Comic Dengeki Daioh. Four volumes compiling the chapters have been released. It is published in English by Seven Seas Entertainment.

== Plot ==
Hotaka likes to see his crush Niki swim from the window of the manga club. That day, the coach of the swimming club tells him that he needs to at least swim once to qualify, unlike the previous year when he just took the theoretical test without actually performing anything physically. His coach, however, knows of his self-consciousness about the large scar on his chest due to a heart operation. He assures him that no one will be present to witness his swimming except himself. Misfortune befalls Hotaka when the coach commits a clumsy mistake by calling everyone at the time. While he trembles out of water, Niki offers her hand. In his self-consciousnesses and nervousness, he slaps her hand away multiple times. Hotaka blames his father for having a weak heart and apparently, they have cut off all ties with his father's family, after his demise. Niki seems to have suffered a similar fate when her father left them alone. She also learns of Hotaka's past when he nonchalantly wrote about it in an article in the manga club magazine thinking that no one would read it anyway, titled "How I lost my father twice". Niki relates to Hotaka's situation and they confess their love for each other after overcoming many doubts about each other.

On their date in the summer festival, Niki asks about Hotaka's actual surname having changed it to his mother's after his father was gone. Hearing it, she runs away and calls her mother angrily, ordering her to pick her up. She then curses her mother with tears in her eyes. It turns out that she is the child conceived in Hotaka's father's second marriage, after he had left Hotaka's mother. The boy she curses everyday and deems the one who took away her father is none other than Hotaka. Following this revelation, she feels guilty of falling in love with her own half-brother and kissing him. As such, she cuts off all ties with him. When Hotaka approaches her, she gives him the cold shoulder and tells him never to touch her again.

Hotaka, in a state of confusion and sadness, goes to the house of his father in the hills, one of the keys to which was given by his paternal grandmother. When he reaches there, he finds Niki coming out of the door. She tells him everything: how he is her brother and asks him to leave the house to her as a compensation for stealing her father from her. He consents and leaves in agony.

Not a day after, the weather has suddenly turned bad with an impending typhoon. Hotaka, without any further delay and acting entirely on his resolve to save Niki, bikes to the house in the hill. She is there and relieved to see Hotaka. Her scooter has been unable to cross the worsened road due to the rain. Hotaka offers his hand and she takes it. Together, they venture through the forest in the heavy rain until a gleam of light is seen, which he says is their father guiding them. They finally reach the safe zone.

In the relief camp, Hotaka's mother comes to visit them and she finally accepts Niki. Hotaka, witnessing the emotional scene, cries in joy. Hotaka starts believing in his father, that he gave up his life so that his son could save Niki.

After a few days, Hotaka and Niki have returned to their normal lives. Apparently, Hotaka and Niki had dated for a short while, and an awkward breakup. At least that's what they decided to leave as the public story to prevent everyone's questioning and therefore keeping their actual relationship a secret. They still share a close relationship, although as brother and sister. This conclusion is brought about by the comparison between sunlight (Niki) and rain (Hotaka). Together, they are the well-spring of all life. However, between them, no flowers shall ever bloom. For them, all of eternity shall be evergreen. Hotaka and Niki vow to always be there for the other. They end their short adventure with a heart-wrenching conclusion, uttering to each-other: "To you, I give eternity".

During the course of their story, On-chan and Soga also managed to confess to each-other after a lot of struggle, given the state of affairs between Hotaka and Niki. They are going out in the final scene.

== Characters ==
- Hotaka Yoshimatsu (吉松 穂高 (よしまつ ほたか), Yoshimatsu Hotaka), a teenage boy who writes prose columns as president of the manga club. He has a crush on swimmer student Niki Awaya but is too shy to talk to her. As his father died of congenital heart disease, Hotaka inherits a similar condition where he has to minimize his physical activities and he bears a large scar on his chest. He has a recurring dream where a person in a fox costume stabs him in the chest.^{Ch. 1}
- Niki Awaya (阿波谷 仁希 (あわや にき), Awaya Niki), a beautiful high school girl with long blonde hair and the ace of the school's swimming club.^{Ch. 1} She has an affection for Hotaka.
- On Hitachi (日立 温 (ひたち おん), Hitachi On), known mainly by her nickname On-chan, a glasses-wearing girl who is Hotaka's junior in manga club. She is very responsible and is slated to be the club president after Hotaka. She withholds her own feelings in getting Hotaka to pursue Niki.^{Ch. 1}
- Shunsuke Soga (蘇我 俊介 (そが しゅんすけ), Soga Shunsuke), a guy in the manga club who is a popular ladies' man.^{Ch. 1}

== Volume list ==
No.	Original release date	Original ISBN	English release date	English ISBN
1	May 26, 2012	978-4-04-886645-3	May 12, 2015	978-1-62-692150-4
2	March 27, 2013	978-4-04-891462-8	August 11, 2015	978-1-62-692168-9
3	January 27, 2014	978-4-04-866237-6	November 17, 2015	978-1-62-692212-9
4	May 27, 2015	978-4-04-869133-8	March 15, 2016	978-1-62-692241-9

== Reception ==
On Anime News Network, Rebecca Silverman gave volume 1 an overall grade of B+, calling it "a nice introduction to a story that has more going on beneath the surface than it at first would appear."
