= Watashitachi no Tamura-kun =

Japanese light novel series

- Watashitachi no Tamura-kun light novel volume 1 cover

わたしたちの田村くん
- Genre: Drama, Romantic comedy
- Light novel
- Written by: Yuyuko Takemiya
- Illustrated by: Yasu
- Published by: MediaWorks
- Imprint: Dengeki Bunko
- Magazine: Dengeki hp
- Original run: June 10, 2005 – September 10, 2005
- Volumes: 2
- Manga
- Written by: Yuyuko Takemiya
- Illustrated by: Sachi Kurafuji
- Published by: MediaWorks
- Magazine: Dengeki Comic Gao!
- Original run: May 27, 2006 – February 27, 2008
- Volumes: 4

Watashitachi no Tamura-kun (わたしたちの田村くん; lit. Our Tamura-kun, officially translated as either Tamura-kun of Ours or Our Dear Tamura-kun) is a two-volume Japanese light novel series by Yuyuko Takemiya, with illustrations by Yasu. The first volume was released on June 10, 2005, and the second followed on September 10, 2005, both published by MediaWorks under their Dengeki Bunko imprint. A manga adaptation by Sachi Kurafuji was serialized in Dengeki Comic Gao! between May 2006 and February 2008. A radio drama was also produced based on the series, and a two-disc compilation of the drama was released on April 30, 2007.

== Plot ==
Watashitachi no Tamura-kun's main story revolves around the title character Yukisada Tamura, who is in his third year of junior-high school when the story begins. Yukisada becomes captivated by a strange and beautiful girl named Komaki Matsuzawa, who says that she was born on another planet and that she is trying to go back. Eventually, Yukisada confesses his feelings for Komaki to her, but before matters can progress, Komaki's grandmother dies and she has to move away. They keep in contact for a while by writing letters, but Komaki stops writing around the time high school entrance exams roll around and they lose contact. On entering high school Yukisada becomes concerned about one of his female classmates named Hiroka Sōma. Hiroka was bullied in junior-high, and stayed home from school to avoid her tormenters. This led to her becoming isolated and helpless. Yukisada chooses not to ignore her, unlike most of his other classmates, and instead starts encouraging her and helps her to build her self-esteem. Before long, Hiroka falls for Yukisada, and confesses her love to him. During this time, Yukisada's best friend, Takakura, has kept in contact with Komaki and has mentioned Hiroka in their communications. Then, one day, Yukisada receives a letter from Komaki asking about Hiroka. This puts Yukisada on the horns of a dilemma where he has to choose between his old love, Komaki, and his new love, Hiroka.

The two-chapter side story titled Takaura-sanchi no Kazokukeikaku (高浦さんちの家族計画) concerns Yukisada Tamura's good friend, Shinichi Takaura and his younger half-sister, Io Tamai. Io detests anything related to matters of love or affection and is very anti-social. Seeing this, Shinichi attempts to rehabilitate his half-sister in the matter of love.

== Characters ==
Yukisada Tamura (田村 雪貞, Tamura Yukisada)
Voiced by: Sōichirō Hoshi
Yukisada is the protagonist of the story. Yukisada lives in a five-person household with his two parents, and an older and younger brother. Basically, he is a frivolous person who easily gets carried away. His favorite meals are eel and home-made jiaozi. At one point, he loved learning about bugs, but has since moved on to the manners and customs during the Kamakura period in Japan. He finds inspiration from Hōjō Tokimune, though his dream is to be someone as great as Emperor Jimmu. The story begins with him in his third year of junior-high school. He falls in love with his classmate and friend Komaki Matsuzawa, and confesses to her one day. However, she moves away almost immediately after due to her grandmother's death. On entering high school he meets another girl, Hiroka Sōma, who eventually confesses to him, setting the stage for the drama to come.
Komaki Matsuzawa (松澤 小巻, Matsuzawa Komaki)
Voiced by: Ryō Hirohashi
Komaki is Yukisada's classmate during their third year of junior-high school. She lost both her parents and her older brother in an accident when she was twelve and was taken in by her grandmother. Due to her loss, she became very quiet and reserved. She is a very strange girl who says that she was born on another planet and wants to go back. She meets Yukisada in her third year of junior-high and little by little opens her heart to him. However, during summer vacation, her grandmother dies and she has to move to live with a distant relative, far away. In school, she always gets top grades, and runs the 200 meter dash on the school track team. Her favorite food is curry.
Hiroka Sōma (相馬 広香, Sōma Hiroka)
Voiced by: Ami Koshimizu
Hiroka is Yukisada's classmate during their first year of high school. While considered to be very beautiful, she acts cold towards others so most people leave her alone; she is given the nickname "Tundra Queen" due to her standoffish personality. During her junior-high school life, she was bullied constantly and even stayed home from school for a year because of it. It turns out that Yukisada's older brother, Nao, tutored her for her high school exams. Some of her classmates from her junior-high still attempt to tease her, though Yukisada does his best to encourage her and help rebuild her self-esteem. Due to this, Hiroka becomes quite attached to Yukisada and one day confesses her love to him; eventually, she shares her first kiss with Yukisada. Hiroka is also very good at cooking.
Hachiya (蜂谷)
Voiced by: Eriko Fujimaki
Hachiya is the school nurse at Yukisada's high school. She encourages Hiroka and advises Hiroka and Yukisada about various things. Her nickname in school is "unripe fruit" (青い果実, Aoikajitsu).
Shinichi Takaura (高浦 真一, Takaura Shinichi)
Voiced by: Atsushi Kisaichi
Shinichi is a good friend of Yukisada's and they have known each other since junior-high school at least, when Shinichi was the class representative of their class. One way or another, he is constantly worrying about his younger half-sister, Io.
Io Tamai (玉井 伊欧, Tamai Io)
Io is Shinichi's half-sister born from Shinichi's father and his mistress. Her mother enjoys trifling with the Takaura family's assets, which makes Io disdain her. Since her familial life is rather complicated, she has gone through different interests from reading books, to researching black magic, and even running a website dedicated to aesthetics. She is extremely disgusted by anything pertaining to love or attraction. She has a pet Shiba Inu named Potato.
Reiko Tamai (玉井 麗子, Tamai Reiko)
Reiko is Io's mother. Since she is Shinichi's father's mistress, she lives in their house. She constantly fights with members of the Takaura family and her daughter but has a surprisingly good relationship with Shinichi as she sees him as a good role model for Io.
Nao Tamura (田村 直, Tamura Nao)
Voiced by: Ryōhei Nakao
Nao is Yukisada's three-years-older brother. He has a sharp mind and spends much of his time at university. He also helps tutor Hiroka with her school work. In short, he is a very dependable older brother. He also constantly concerns himself with matters of Japanese lexicon.
Takayuki Tamura (田村 孝之, Tamura Takayuki)
Takayuki is Yukisada's three-years-younger brother. He enjoys playing sports and is popular with girls. During his sixth year of elementary school, he devotes much of his time to playing soccer.
Ritsuka Kurokawa (黒川 立夏, Kurokawa Ritsuka)
Ritsuka is Komaki's classmate during their first year of high school. Like Komaki, she also has someone she likes and misses due to physical distance between them. She is the main character from the short side story "Himitsu Melancholy".
Yōko Shikata (鹿多 瑤子, Shikata Yōko)
Yōko is the class representative of Yukisada's class during their first year of high school. She also appears in the short side story "Ohige Girls".

== Media ==
=== Light novels ===
Watashitachi no Tamura-kun began as two-volume series of light novels written by Yuyuko Takemiya and drawn by Yasu. The novels are published by MediaWorks under their Dengeki Bunko publishing label. The first novel was released on June 10, 2005, and the second followed on September 10, 2005. The series comprises three main chapters and two extra side story chapters; the first volume contains the first two main chapters and the first side story chapter, while the second volume contains the third main chapter and the second side story chapter. The first main chapter was serialized in the autumn 2004 edition of Dengeki hp Special, a special edition version MediaWorks' now-defunct light novel magazine Dengeki hp. The second main chapter was serialized in Dengeki hp between the 34th and 35th volumes.

Manga cover volume 1 featuring Komaki (left), and Hiroka (right)

There were also a series of stories not collected into volumes. The first was a short story called "Watashitashi no Chō! Tamura-kun" which appeared in the November 2005 issue of the light novel anthology magazine Dengeki hPa. Another called "Himitsu Melancholy" appeared in the Watashitashi no Tamura-kun First Fan Book which came bundled with the July 2006 issue of Dengeki Comic Gao!. The last was an additional story added to the drama CD named "Ohige Girls".

=== Manga ===
A manga adaptation illustrated by Sachi Kurafuji was serialized in the Japanese shōnen manga magazine Dengeki Comic Gao! between May 27, 2006, and February 27, 2008, published by MediaWorks. The chapters were collected into four tankōbon volumes published under MediaWorks' Dengeki Comics imprint between December 16, 2006, and June 27, 2008.

=== Radio drama ===
A radio drama based on the main story from the light novels aired on MediaWorks' radio program Dengeki Taishō between December 23, 2006, and January 13, 2007, containing four episodes. The radio drama aired on three Japanese radio stations: Nippon Cultural Broadcasting, Radio Osaka, and Tokai Radio Broadcasting. The drama was later released as a two-disc drama CD set on April 30, 2007; the drama is approximately ninety-five minutes in length. The CD package also contained an original short story written by the author of the novels named "Ohige Girls", two cell phone straps and charms each, and a computer desktop wallpaper accessible via the second CD.
