= Hōkago Play =

Japanese manga series

- Cover art of the first printed release of the Hōkago Play manga

放課後プレイ (Hōkago Purei)
- Genre: Romantic comedy, slice of life
- Manga
- Written by: Rendou Kurosaki
- Published by: ASCII Media Works
- Imprint: Dengeki Comics EX
- Magazine: Dengeki PlayStation (2007-2016); Quality Rokugo Comics (2017-2019)
- Original run: October 26, 2007 – May 4, 2019
- Volumes: 8
- Manga

Uniform Date
- Written by: Rendou Kurosaki
- Published by: Hakusensha
- Magazine: Le Paradis
- Original run: June 30, 2017 – present
- Volumes: 4

Hōkago Play (放課後プレイ, Hōkago Purei; lit. "Afterschool Play") is a Japanese manga series written and illustrated by Rendou Kurosaki. The manga follow various couples in Japan who usually spend their free time playing and talking about video games and how their relationships progress in 4koma style.

The manga was serialized in Dengeki PlayStation from October 2007 to September 2016 and has been collected into eight tankōbon volumes by Dengeki Comics. In March 2010, a drama CD was released by Geneon Entertainment.

== Characters ==
Girlfriend (彼女, Kanojo)
Voiced by: Shizuka Itō
A high school girl who dwarfs her boyfriend in terms of height. She comes to his apartment after school when she's not busy with club activities. She is also fairly aggressive when it comes to her boyfriend and usually kicks at him whenever she's in a bad mood or wronged, but is exceptionally meek when it comes to actual romancing like hugging and kissing. She is also the postergirl for the series. She enjoys fighting games the most.
Boyfriend (彼氏, Kareshi)
Voiced by: Takuma Terashima
A high school boy whose girlfriend dwarfs him by quite a bit. He participates in no after school activities and the majority of his interactions with Kanojo are at his place. Much like Kanojo he is quite bashful himself when it comes to the romantic parts of their relationship.

== Manga ==
Written and drawn by Rendou Kurosaki, the Hōkago Play manga series was serialized in ASCII Media Works' Dengeki PlayStation from October 26, 2007, to September 30, 2016, and has been collected into eight tankōbon volumes by Dengeki Comics.

== Drama CD ==
In March 2010, a Drama CD was released by ASCII and Geneon. The CD covers most of the content in the first volume of the manga, with Shizuka Itō voicing Kanojo and Takuma Terashima voicing Kareshi.
