= Dengeki Bunko Magazine =

Japanese light novel magazine

- Cover of the first issue of Dengeki Bunko Magazine featuring Shana from Shakugan no Shana. Illustration by Noizi Ito.
- Categories: Fiction, Male oriented light novels
- Frequency: Quarterly
- Publisher: ASCII Media Works
- First issue: December 10, 2007
- Final issue: April 9, 2020
- Country: Japan
- Language: Japanese
- Website: dengekibunko.dengeki.com

Dengeki Bunko Magazine (電撃文庫MAGAZINE) was a Japanese light novel magazine published by ASCII Media Works (formerly MediaWorks). The magazine succeeded the light novel magazine Dengeki hp, and originally was published as a special edition issue of Dengeki Daioh for the first two issues; the first issue was released on December 10, 2007. Dengeki Bunko Magazine became an independent magazine with the publication of its third volume on April 10, 2008. The magazine publishes information pertaining to ASCII Media Works' light novel publishing label Dengeki Bunko, along with short stories written by already established authors who have had previous light novels published under Dengeki Bunko. Other information pertains to adaptations from the light novels, such as video games, anime, or manga. The magazine ended on April 9, 2020.

== Serialized stories ==
- 86: Eighty-Six
- Accel World
- Adachi and Shimamura
- Ballad of a Shinigami: Unknown Stars
- C³
- Kino's Journey: the Beautiful World
- Lillia and Treize Spin-off: Seron no Yume
- Shakugan no Shana
- Spice and Wolf
- Sword Art Online
- Toaru Majutsu no Index SS
- Toradora!
- Toradora Spin-off!
