= Toradora! =

Japanese light novel series

- First light novel volume cover, featuring Taiga Aisaka

とらドラ!
- Genre: Romantic comedy; Slice of life
- Light novel
- Written by: Yuyuko Takemiya
- Illustrated by: Yasu
- Published by: ASCII Media Works
- English publisher: NA: Seven Seas Entertainment
- Imprint: Dengeki Bunko
- Original run: March 10, 2006 – March 10, 2009
- Volumes: 10
- Light novel

Toradora Spin-off!
- Written by: Yuyuko Takemiya
- Illustrated by: Yasu
- Published by: ASCII Media Works
- Imprint: Dengeki Bunko
- Magazine: Dengeki Bunko Magazine
- Original run: May 10, 2007 – April 10, 2010
- Volumes: 3
- Manga
- Written by: Yuyuko Takemiya
- Illustrated by: Zekkyō
- Published by: ASCII Media Works
- English publisher: NA: Seven Seas Entertainment
- Magazine: Dengeki Comic Gao! (former); Dengeki Daioh
- Original run: July 27, 2007 – present
- Volumes: 12
- Anime television series
- Directed by: Tatsuyuki Nagai
- Produced by: Takahiro Nakayama; Takaaki Yuasa; Shinichi Ikeda; Muneyuki Kanbe; Yuji Matsukura
- Written by: Mari Okada
- Music by: Yukari Hashimoto
- Studio: J.C.Staff
- Licensed by: AUS: Hanabee; NA: NIS America (expired); Discotek Media; SEA: Mighty Media; UK: MVM Films
- Original network: TXN (TV Tokyo)
- English network: PH: TV5
- Original run: October 2, 2008 – March 26, 2009
- Episodes: 25
- Video game
- Developer: Guyzware
- Publisher: Namco Bandai Games
- Genre: Visual novel
- Platform: PlayStation Portable
- Released: April 30, 2009
- Original video animation
- Directed by: Tatsuyuki Nagai
- Written by: Mari Okada
- Studio: J.C.Staff
- Licensed by: AUS: Hanabee; NA: NIS America (expired); Discotek Media; UK: MVM Films
- Released: December 21, 2011
- Runtime: 27 minutes
- icon

Toradora! (Japanese: とらドラ!) is a Japanese light novel series written by Yuyuko Takemiya and illustrated by Yasu. ASCII Media Works released ten volumes between March 2006 and March 2009 under their Dengeki Bunko imprint. Three volumes of a spin-off light novel series titled Toradora Spin-off! were later published. The main series follows Ryūji Takasu and Taiga Aisaka, two social outcasts who gradually fall in love while trying to help each other get with their crushes. The title Toradora! is derived from the names of the two main characters.

A manga adaptation by Zekkyō was serialized in MediaWorks' shōnen manga magazine Dengeki Comic Gao! from September 2007 to March 2008. The manga continued serialization in ASCII Media Works' shōnen manga magazine Dengeki Daioh in the May 2008 issue.

A 25-episode anime adaptation produced by J.C.Staff aired in Japan on TV Tokyo between October 2008 and March 2009. NIS America released the anime in North America in two half-season DVD collections in July and August 2010, with an English dub released in July 2014. An original video animation (OVA) episode was released on December 21, 2011.

== Plot ==
Ryuji Takasu is frustrated at his appearance as he enters his second year of high school. Despite his gentle personality, his glaring eyes give him the appearance of a delinquent. He is happy to be classmates with his best friend Yusaku Kitamura, as well as the girl he has a crush on, Minori Kushieda. However, he unexpectedly runs into Taiga Aisaka, an infamously short-tempered girl, who is Minori's best friend. Taiga takes an instant dislike to Ryuji. She also happens to live in an apartment next to Ryuji's house. When Ryuji discovers that Taiga has a crush on Yusaku, and Taiga finds out about Ryuji's affection towards Minori, they decide to help set each other up with their crushes.

Over the course of the series, Ryuji and Taiga try to set up romantic situations to help each other get to know their friends, but many of the situations backfire. Their classmates observe that they are spending a lot of time with each other, leading to rumors that they might be a couple. Although Ryuji and Taiga try to dispel the rumors, they find that they do enjoy each other's company, with Taiga visiting Ryuji's house to share meals, and Ryuji checking up on Taiga and cleaning her messy house. Later, they meet Yusaku's childhood friend Ami Kawashima, a popular teen model who transfers into their school. She appears to be friendly and is a self-proclaimed ditz, but beneath her facade is a more mean and spoiled side, and she quickly finds herself at odds with Taiga. In spite of this, Taiga tries to put up with her antics as Yusaku wants them to all get along, and Ami begins to grow feelings for Ryuji. The series follows the lives of these friends and how love blossoms among them.

== Characters ==
=== Main characters ===
The main characters of Toradora! (from left to right): Ryuji, Yusaku, Taiga, Minori, and Ami.

Ryuji Takasu (高須 竜児, Takasu Ryūji; Manga: Ryuuji Takasu)
Voiced by: Junji Majima (Japanese); Erik Scott Kimerer (English)
The viewpoint character of the light novels, Ryuji is introduced as a second-year high school student with a mistaken reputation of being a delinquent because of his sanpaku (glaring) eyes which resemble his father's. He lives with his single mother, his father having left before he was born. Because of this, Ryuji has learned to be self-sufficient: he cooks and cleans. Despite his appearance, he is a kind and selfless person, and takes care of his mother and his friends. He has a longstanding crush on his cheerful and pretty classmate Minori Kushieda. After Ryuji meets Taiga Aisaka, he often helps her with domestic chores, and develops a new reputation as the "only person able to stop the Palmtop Tiger" as well as having to fend off rumors that the two might be a couple.^{Vol. 1} Although he initially does not have a romantic interest in Taiga, he decides to look after her and try to become friends with her.
Due to the misunderstandings caused by his appearance and his family situation, he has low self-esteem. In spite of this, he is rather calm in most situations and is responsible, smart, and has great grades, even compared to Yusaku Kitamura, his best friend. He prefers avoiding serious conflicts and tends to put others first, to the point of losing sight of what he really wants in life.
In the light novels, he sees a tender side of Taiga that she hides from everyone. In the anime, he is dense when it comes to girls' feelings, especially when it comes to Taiga, Minori, and Ami. His relationship with Taiga begins to change as he spends more time with her throughout the series, although he is oblivious to Taiga's feelings for him at first. Eventually, he reciprocates, and he and Taiga become a couple at the end of the series.
Taiga Aisaka (逢坂 大河, Aisaka Taiga)
Voiced by: Rie Kugimiya (Japanese); Cassandra Lee Morris (English)
The other title character of the series, a girl who sometimes acts like a tsundere when talking to Ryuji. She has a beautiful appearance, but dislikes the company of others, with the exception of her best friend Minori Kushieda. Because of her tendency to snap fiercely at others, and her diminutive stature (143.6 cm (4 ft 8.5 in)),^{a} Taiga's nickname is "Palmtop Tiger" (手乗りタイガー, Tenori Taigā). She often receives confessions of love from boys due to her cute appearance but she turns down every single one. Despite her reputation, she is a clumsy girl who is very shy and awkward around her crush Kitamura.^{Vol. 1} Although she comes from a well-to-do family, she constantly fought with them,^{Ch. 5} eventually moving out and living on her own. Having come from a privileged household, she does not know how to do any domestic chores. Upon meeting Ryuji and learning of his domestic talents, she relies on him to cook for her.^{Vol. 1, 2} Aside from sleeping in her own apartment and going to school, she spends most of her time at Ryuji's house, so much so that his mother considers her a member of the family.^{Vol. 1} She eventually admits to herself that she has fallen in love with Ryuji, and they become a couple at the end of the series.
Minori Kushieda (櫛枝 実乃梨, Kushieda Minori)
Voiced by: Yui Horie (Japanese); Christine Marie Cabanos (English)
A cheerful red haired student who is Ryuji's crush and Taiga's best friend. She is captain of the girls' softball club.^{Vol. 1} She tends to be air-headed at times, but is very perceptive and hardworking, being one of the few people to see Ryuji for the gentle person he is and also not being fooled by Ami's facade.^{Ch. 15} When she hears rumors that Ryuji and Taiga are a couple, she pulls both of them aside and begs Ryuji to take good care of Taiga. She works many part-time jobs preferring to keep herself busy.^{Vol. 2} She enjoys food, having once made a whole tub of pudding,^{Ch. 1} and teaming up with Taiga as a struggling "diet soldier".^{Ch. 18} She is capable in cooking and cleaning as a result of her part-time jobs as well as taking care of her little brother, Midori while both her parents work.^{Ch. 34, 38} She loves horror, and talks about "ghosts" as a metaphor for love, which she hopes to be able to "see" someday; one time, she opens up to Ryuji regarding her feelings about love.^{Vol. 6}
Yusaku Kitamura (北村 祐作, Kitamura Yūsaku)
Voiced by: Hirofumi Nojima (Japanese); Johnny Yong Bosch (English)
Ryuji's classmate and initially his only friend. He is the vice-president of the student council, the class representative, and captain of the boys' softball club. Yusaku wears glasses and has a diligent personality. Although he thinks he is poor at talking to girls, Ryuji observes that Yusaku is actually quite popular with them.^{Vol. 1} When Taiga confesses to him, he reveals that he had actually confessed to Taiga a year prior because she was so beautiful, but was rejected.^{Vol. 2} While not buried in student council activities, Yusaku exhibits an eccentric personality, as demonstrated in a bonus chapter where he plays the President card game without knowing the rules,^{Vol. 4} and a summer trip story where he walks around in a towel and flashes the girls.^{Vol. 5} In a later storyline, it is revealed he had a crush on the student council president Sumire Kanou, but got so depressed over her departure that he bleached his hair.^{Vol. 7} His nickname is "Maruo" (a reference to the class president in Chibi Maruko-chan).^{Vol. 6, 7}
Ami Kawashima (川嶋 亜美, Kawashima Ami)
Voiced by: Eri Kitamura (Japanese); Erika Harlacher (English)
Yusaku's childhood friend who transfers into his class midway through their second year of high school. She works as a fashion model and is very popular with both guys and girls. However, behind the façade is a spoiled person who looks down others, aside from those she's trying to impress. Yusaku hopes that Ami will be honest with her true character and not have such a dual nature. She develops a fierce rivalry with Taiga, and flirts with Ryuji to demonstrate how she can easily manipulate him to take him away. However, Ryuji and the other main characters are all aware of her true nature.^{Vol. 2, 3} In a storyline where she is trying to evade a stalker, she ends up depending on Ryuji and Taiga, although the latter blackmails her using footage of Ami's singing and reciting a list of Pokémon.^{Vol. 3} After seeing Taiga standing up to the stalker, she drops her sweet façade to chew out the stalker, and later asks Ryuji if he would come to love her real self.^{Vol. 3} She comes from a rich background; her family has a lavish vacation home that she takes Ryuji and his friends to over the summer.^{Vol. 4} She often understands the feelings of others easily and teases others for being naive. Over the course of the series, she becomes attracted to Ryuji despite regularly teasing him, and matures in her character.^{Vol. 5}

=== Supporting characters ===
Inko (インコ, Inko)
Voiced by: Saori Gotō (Japanese); Wendee Lee (English)
Ryuji's parakeet, usually called Inko-chan. Her name is the Japanese word for parakeet. Though apparently healthy, she often looks sickly. Despite struggling to say her simple name (a running gag throughout the series), she has a good understanding of human speech and can interact with her owners and pronounce words much more difficult than her name, oftentimes relevant to the situation at hand.
Yasuko Takasu (高須 泰子, Takasu Yasuko)
Voiced by: Sayaka Ōhara (Japanese); Karen Strassman (English)
Ryuji's mother who works nights at a hostess bar (a Japanese "snack club"). She acts childish, depending on Ryuji to cook and clean for her. She is often seen getting in trouble with the landlady for whatever shenanigans go on in their apartment. She is proud that Ryuji is able to go to high school, something she was not able to complete. She initially claims that her husband died before he was born,^{Vol. 1} but it is later revealed that he left her instead. She instantly takes a liking to Taiga and treats her like a family member.^{Vol. 1}
Yuri Koigakubo (恋ヶ窪 ゆり, Koigakubo Yuri)
Voiced by: Rie Tanaka (Japanese); Carrie Keranen (English)
Ryuji's homeroom teacher. She has a reputation of telling long stories that Kitamura stops immediately by dismissing the class.^{Ch. 5} She likes to do things at her own pace and is timid towards Taiga's way of speaking out. In the fifth volume of the light novel, she becomes concerned about getting into a relationship leading to marriage before she turns 30, and when that birthday comes, she becomes depressed, which is further aggravated whenever Taiga mentions that she is single.^{LN 5} She has interests in real estate, which is a crutch for her being single.
Kōji Haruta (春田 浩次, Haruta Kōji)
Voiced by: Hiroyuki Yoshino (Japanese); Brian Beacock (English)
Ryuji's classmate, a student who has long hair.^{Ch. 6}^{LN 1 ch. 5} He is regarded as the class "idiot", an opinion deepened by his poor grades and overly energetic behavior.^{Ch. 47} His childish pranks often target Taiga, and he has been the victim of her violent outbursts. Despite his clueless demeanor, later in the series he is revealed to have a girlfriend.
Hisamitsu Noto (能登 久光, Noto Hisamitsu)
Voiced by: Kazuyuki Okitsu (Japanese); Max Mittelman (English)
A male student in Ryuji's class who wears glasses. He was also in Ryuji's class the previous year and is on good terms with him. He is first seen during the basketball warmup scenario where he pairs up with Minori.^{LN 1 ch 4,}^{Ch. 4,}^{Ep. 2} Noto begins to develop feelings for Maya Kihara following an argument they have during the class' winter ski trip.
Maya Kihara (木原 麻耶, Kihara Maya)
Voiced by: Ai Nonaka (Japanese); Mela Lee (English)
An attractive classmate of Ryuji who often hangs out with Nanako. She is a kogal and the center of the "stand-out-group" of girls of class 2-C.^{Ch. 27} She ends up pairing with Yusaku in basketball warmups.^{LN 1 ch 4,}^{Ch. 4,}^{Ep. 2} She has a crush on Yusaku, and she wants Taiga and Ryuji to be together so that she can have Yusaku instead.
Nanako Kashii (香椎 奈々子, Kashii Nanako)
Voiced by: Momoko Ishikawa (Japanese); Karen Strassman (English)
A female student in Ryuji's class who often hangs out with Maya and Ami.
Sumire Kanō (狩野 すみれ, Kanō Sumire)
Voiced by: Yūko Kaida (Japanese); Wendee Lee (English)
The student council president. She has a strong-minded personality and inspires fellow students to follow her. Her parents own a supermarket.^{Ch. 49} When she tells the council she plans to leave school early to study in the United States to become an astronaut, Yusaku is so heartbroken that he dyes his hair and quits the council.^{Vol. 7}. When he later confesses his love for her in front of the whole school, she pushes him away. After fighting with Taiga, she reveals that she does love Kitamura, but doesn't tell him, fearing that he'll chase after her to America.
Kōta Tomiie (富家 幸太, Tomiie Kōta)
Voiced by: Nobuhiko Okamoto (Japanese); Ben Giroux (English)
A first-year student who is the main character in Toradora Spin-off! He is generally unhappy about his life. He works on the student council in general affairs, and gets good grades. When first seen, he has a completely mistaken idea what the term "Palmtop Tiger" refers to, and develops an insane crush on Taiga. He later develops a crush on Sakura, and eventually succeeds in starting a romantic relationship with her.
Sakura Kanō (狩野 さくら, Kanō Sakura)
Voiced by: Kana Asumi (Japanese); Faye Mata (English)
Sumire's younger sister who attends the same high school as Sumire, although her grades are horrible. She unconsciously flirts with people, and like her sister, she hates snakes. She later starts going out with Kōta.

== Production ==
=== Light novels ===
==== Conception ====
The title Toradora! was derived from the names of the two main characters, Taiga and Ryūji. Taiga's name is almost homophonic with taigā (タイガー) from English tiger, which is synonymous with the native Japanese word tora (とら, 虎). Inversely, ryū (竜) means dragon, and is synonymous with doragon (ドラゴン), the English word dragon transcribed into Japanese.

== Media ==
=== Light novels ===
The light novels of Toradora! are written by Yuyuko Takemiya and drawn by Yasu. Ten novels were published by ASCII Media Works under their Dengeki Bunko imprint between March 10, 2006, and March 10, 2009. Four additional chapters were not collected into volumes; three of them were published in separate light novel anthologies released by MediaWorks in November 2006, March 2007, and November 2007, while the last came with a plush tiger stuffed animal released in April 2007. Seven Seas Entertainment licensed series in North America, releasing the first volume in 2018 and the last in 2020.

Three volumes of a spin-off of the series under the title Toradora Spin-off! (とらドラ・スピンオフ!) were also created. The first volume of the spin-off series was released on May 10, 2007, and compiled four chapters, three of which had been serialized in MediaWorks' now-defunct light novel magazine Dengeki hp between June 10, 2006, and February 10, 2007, and one of which was written especially for the volume release. A single chapter of the spin-off series, originally published in February 2006 in Dengeki hp, was included in the second volume of the regular novel series. More chapters started serialization in Dengeki hp's successor Dengeki Bunko Magazine on December 10, 2007. The second volume of Toradora Spin-off! was released on January 10, 2009, followed by the third volume on April 10, 2010, which was released to commemorate 2010 as the Year of the Tiger.

=== Manga ===
A manga adaptation illustrated by Zekkyō started serialization in the September 2007 issue of MediaWorks' shōnen manga magazine Dengeki Comic Gao!. The manga ended its run in Dengeki Comic Gao! in the March 2008 issue, but continued serialization in ASCII Media Works' manga magazine Dengeki Daioh from the May 2008 issue onward. The first tankōbon volume was released on February 27, 2008, under ASCII Media Works' Dengeki Comics imprint; as of April 27, 2026, 12 volumes have been released. Seven Seas Entertainment licensed the manga in North America and began publishing the series in English on March 1, 2011.

=== Anime ===
An anime television series adaptation was first announced on a promotional advertisement for light novels being released under ASCII Media Works' Dengeki Bunko imprint for April 2008. The anime is directed by Tatsuyuki Nagai and produced by the animation studio J.C.Staff. Toradora! contains 25 episodes, which aired between October 2, 2008, and March 26, 2009, on TV Tokyo in Japan. The episodes aired at later dates on AT-X, TV Aichi, TV Hokkaido, TV Osaka, TV Setouchi, and TVQ Kyushu Broadcasting. The anime premiered in the Philippines through TV5 on May 18, 2009, one of the first to air it outside Japan.

The first volume DVD compilation, which contains the first four episodes, was released in Japan on January 21, 2009, by King Records in limited and regular editions. Seven more DVD compilations, each containing three episodes, were released between February 25 and August 26, 2009, also in limited and regular editions. Starting from the second DVD, there were extra animated shorts included in the DVD volumes, Toradora SOS!, which features the cast as chibis trying out various foods. A six-disc Blu-ray Disc box set, released in Japan on December 21, 2011, contains an original video animation (OVA) episode.

The Toradora! anime was licensed by NIS America in North America. The series was released in two half-season DVD compilation volumes in early July and late August 2010. NIS America re-released the series on Blu-ray on July 1, 2014, including the unreleased OVA and featuring an English dub. It was broadcast in Italy on Rai 4 between April 28 and October 13, 2011. MVM Entertainment have licensed the Blu-ray collection in the United Kingdom. The series was simulcast worldwide by Crunchyroll on October 18, 2012. After Sony acquired Crunchyroll, the series was removed from the streaming service on April 1, 2025. The anime series was streamed on Netflix on August 1, 2020. On August 1, 2026, Discotek Media announced they acquired the rights to the series, and would be reissuing the series on Blu-ray on October 27, 2026.

The anime series makes use of four pieces of theme music: two opening and two ending themes. The first opening theme is "Pre-Parade" (プレパレード, Pureparēdo) by Rie Kugimiya, Eri Kitamura, and Yui Horie. The first ending theme is "Vanilla Salt" (バニラソルト, Banira Soruto) by Horie. The second opening is "Silky Heart" by Horie, and the second ending is "Orange" (オレンジ, Orenji) by Kugimiya, Kitamura, and Horie. The insert theme for episode nineteen is "Holy Night" (ホーリーナイト, Hōrī Naito) performed by Kugimiya and Kitamura. The anime's original soundtrack was released on January 7, 2009.

=== Internet radio show ===
An internet radio show to promote the anime series and other Toradora! media titled ToradoRadio! (とらドラジオ!, Toradorajio!) aired 38 episodes between September 4, 2008, and May 28, 2009, on Animate TV. The show was streamed online every Thursday, and was hosted by Junji Majima and Eri Kitamura, who voiced Ryūji Takasu and Ami Kawashima from the anime respectively. The show featured additional voice actors from the anime as guests.

=== Video games ===
A visual novel developed by Guyzware and published by Bandai Namco Games based on Toradora! is playable on the PlayStation Portable, and was released on April 30, 2009. The player assumes the role of Ryuji Takasu where he moves around school and town, conversing with characters and working towards multiple endings as part of an original storyline. The game also features a minigame where players play as Taiga, fending off lovesick guys.

Taiga is a playable character in the game Dengeki Gakuen RPG: Cross of Venus for the Nintendo DS, released on March 19, 2009, in Japan. She appears as a cameo character and optional costume for the main character in Nippon Ichi Software's Z.H.P. Unlosing Ranger VS Darkdeath Evilman for the PlayStation Portable. Taiga is a playable character in the fighting game Dengeki Bunko: Fighting Climax, with Ryuji as an assisting character. She appears in Twinkle Crusaders Starlit Brave, which was released on September 30, 2010.

== Reception ==
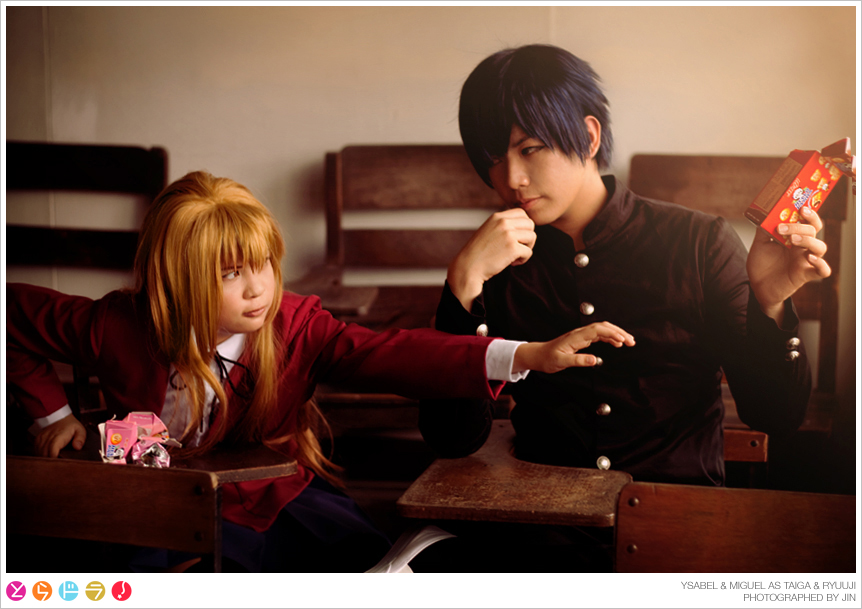
Taiga and Ryūji cosplayers

=== Sales ===
By April 2009, over 3 million copies of the light novel series had been sold in Japan. By October 2017, it had over 5 million copies in circulation. The seventh volume of the Toradora! light novels ranked as the tenth best-selling light novel between December 2007 and November 2008 by Amazon's Japanese subsidiary. The second volume of the Toradora! manga was ranked 28th on the Tohan charts between March 3–9, 2009.

The first Toradora! DVD ranked 13th on the Oricon DVD chart between January 20–26, 2009. The second DVD ranked 15th between February 24 and March 2, 2009. The third DVD ranked 27th between March 24–30, 2009. The fourth DVD ranked 17th between April 21–28, 2009. The fifth DVD ranked 7th between May 25–31, 2009. The sixth DVD ranked 11th between June 22–28, 2009. The seventh DVD ranked 19th between July 20–26, 2009. The eighth DVD ranked 13th between August 24–30, 2009.

=== Critical reception ===
Thereon Martin of Anime News Network gave particular praise to the first half of the anime for its character writing, describing the series as "blessed" in that regard. He opined that while the plot elements were typical of anime romantic comedies, the series distinguished itself through "quality writing and genuine depth", as well as a strong balance between humor and drama. He called the show a "rare gem" and gave the first half an "A-" rating.

Reviewing the second half of the anime, Martin was even more effusive in his praise, calling it one of the "best romantic comedies anime has ever generated". He acclaimed the "fresh and wonderful" drama, realism of the characters' emotions, and "superb" writing held together by a "great sense of timing and dialog". He concluded by giving the "immensely entertaining and moving" second half an "A" rating.

Stig Høgset of THEM Anime Reviews expressed reservations about the initial episodes of the anime, opining that the story went on a "pretty steep upward slope". He also criticized Taiga's behavior towards Ryuji, as well as the story arc with the introduction of Taiga's father. He was more enthused about the story's clear resolution to Ryuji and Taiga's relationship, which he felt distinguished it from similar shows with more than one love interest. Despite Høgset's mixed comments, he remarked that it was "on average a good show".

=== Accolades ===
The light novel series has ranked four times in Takarajimasha's light novel guide book Kono Light Novel ga Sugoi! published yearly: sixth in 2007, fourth in 2008 and 2010, and second in 2009. In Kadokawa Shoten's first Light Novel Award contest held in 2007, Toradora! won an award in the romantic comedy category.

The Toradora! anime was selected as a recommended work by the awards jury of the thirteenth Japan Media Arts Festival in 2009. Taiga Aisaka's character was named the champion of the eighth Anime Saimoe Tournament in 2009. In 2009, Rie Kugimiya won Best Actress in the third Seiyu Awards partly for voicing Taiga Aisaka.

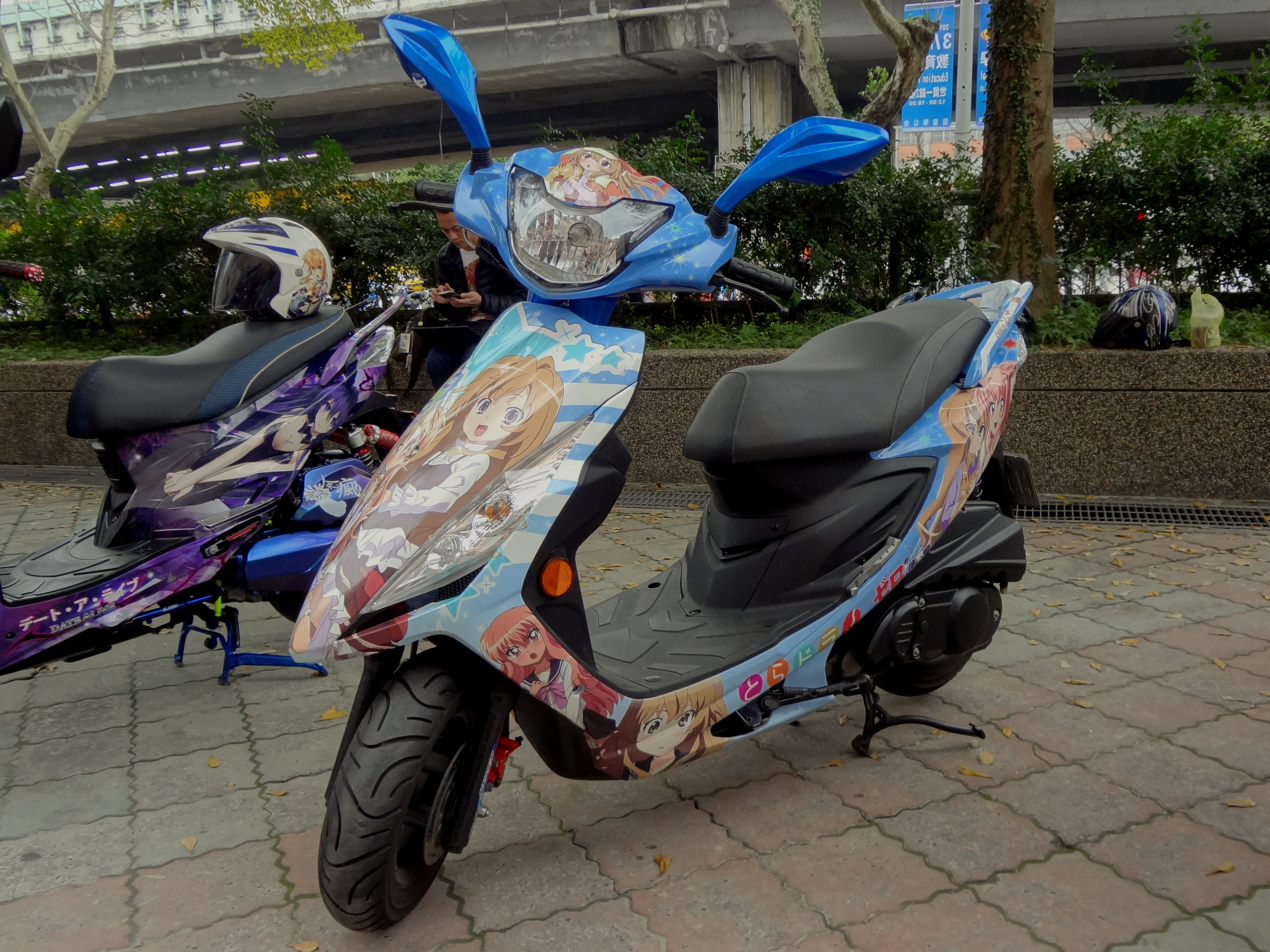
A bike featuring Taiga

== Notes ==
- "LN" is shortened form for light novel and refers to a volume number of the Toradora! light novels.
- "Ch." and "Vol." are shortened form for chapter and volume, referring to the Toradora! manga
- "Ep." is shortened form for episode of the Toradora! anime
- Taiga's height is listed differently depending on the media and translation: In the light novel volume 2 profiles, she self-declares her height as 145 cm (4 ft 9 in) but her actual is 143.6 cm (4 ft 8.5 in).^{LN 2} In the TV Tokyo anime profile, she is listed as 143.6 cm (4 ft 8.5 in) In the NIS America anime profile she is listed as 4 feet 7 inches.
