= Dengeki hp =

Japanese light novel magazine

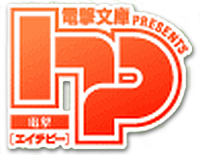

- Cover of volume 47.
- Categories: Fiction, Male oriented light novels
- Frequency: Quarterly (volume 1–8); Bimonthly (volume 9–50)
- First issue: December 18, 1998
- Final issue Number: October 10, 2007; 50
- Company: MediaWorks
- Country: Japan
- Based in: Tokyo
- Language: Japanese
- Website: Dengeki hp

Dengeki hp (電撃hp) was a Japanese magazine published by MediaWorks centered on publishing light novels aimed at a young adult male readership. The first issue was released on December 18, 1998, and for the first eight issues was published quarterly; after this, it was published bimonthly. The magazine was discontinued in October 2007, and was succeeded by Dengeki Bunko Magazine in December 2007.

== List of serialized titles ==
- 9S
- Aruhi, Bakudan ga Ochide Kite
- Ballad of a Shinigami
- Bludgeoning Angel Dokuro-Chan
- Cheerful Charmer Momo
- E.G. Combat
- Hanbun no Tsuki ga Noboru Sora
- Inside World
- Inukami!
- Iriya no Sora, UFO no Natsu
- Kino's Journey
- Mamoru-kun ni Megami no Shukufuku wo!
- Missing:Kamikakushi
- Nogizaka Haruka no Himitsu
- Shakugan no Shana
- Tensō no Shita no Bashireisu
- Thunder Girl!
- Toradora!
- Toradora Spin-off!
- Watashitachi no Tamura-kun
