= Yasu (illustrator) =

Japanese illustrator

Yasu (ヤス, born August 3, 1984) is a Japanese illustrator from Tokushima Prefecture, Japan, though now lives in Tokyo. As of 2007, Yasu is a freelance illustrator.

== Works ==
Light novels

- Koe de Bakasete yo Baby
- Oto × Maho
- Phantom
- Reverse Brad
- Toradora!
- Watashitachi no Tamura-kun
- Yūkyū Tenbōdai no Kai
- Mayoi Neko Overrun! (vol.10)

Game character design

- Chaos Wars
- Lisa to Isshoni Tairikuōdan!: A-Train de Ikō
- Spectral Glories
- The Promise of Haruhi Suzumiya (assistant)

Manga

- Itsukasei Metsubō Syndrome
- Dōbutsu no Meido-san
- Joshiraku (story by Kōji Kumeta)
- Hokkenshitsu
- Mangirl! (character design)
- Nankuru Neesan (story by Kōji Kumeta)

Anime character design

- Mangirl! (Original Anime Character Design)

Other

- Hayate the Combat Butler Trading Card Game
