= Yuyuko Takemiya =

Japanese writer (born 1978)

- 竹宮 ゆゆこ
- Born: February 24, 1978 (age 48); Tokyo, Japan
- Occupation: Writer
- Years active: 2004–present
- Notable work: Toradora! Golden Time

Yuyuko Takemiya (竹宮 ゆゆこ, Takemiya Yuyuko; born February 24, 1978) is a Japanese writer of light novels, novels, and manga, best known as the creator of Toradora! and Golden Time.

== Biography ==
Takemiya debuted in September 2004 with her light novel series Watashitachi no Tamura-kun (Or Tamura-kun) which first appeared in the autumn 2004 issue of Dengeki hp Special, a special edition version of Dengeki hp. That same month, Takemiya worked on the scenario for the bishōjo game Noel by FlyingShine (also known for creating Cross Channel). Following the completion of Watashitachi no Tamura-kun, Takemiya created her best-known series, Toradora!, which she declared to be complete in April 2010 after ten volumes and three spin-off books. The first book of her next series, Golden Time, was Dengeki Bunko's 2000th published light novel. Takemiya launched the manga series Evergreen with artist Akira Caskabe on July 19, 2011 in ASCII Media Works' Dengeki Daioh Genesis quarterly magazine. it finished publication on May 27, 2015.

== Works ==
Light novels

- Watashitachi no Tamura-kun (わたしたちの田村くん) (under Dengeki Bunko, illustration by Yasu)
  - Watashitachi no Tamura-kun ISBN 4-8402-3066-8 (June 2005)
  - Watashitachi no Tamura-kun 2 ISBN 4-8402-3152-4 (September 2005)
- Toradora! (とらドラ!) (under Dengeki Bunko, illustration by Yasu)
  - Toradora! ISBN 4-8402-3353-5 (March 10, 2006)
  - Toradora2! ISBN 4-8402-3438-8 (May 10, 2006)
  - Toradora3! ISBN 4-8402-3551-1 (September 10, 2006)
  - Toradora4! ISBN 978-4-8402-3681-2 (January 10, 2007)
  - Toradora Spinoff! Koufuku no Sakura-iro Tornado ISBN 978-4-8402-3838-0 (May 10, 2007)
  - Toradora5! ISBN 978-4-8402-3932-5 (August 10, 2007)
  - Toradora6! ISBN 978-4-8402-4117-5 (December 10, 2007)
  - Toradora7! ISBN 978-4-04-867019-7 (April 10, 2008)
  - Toradora8! ISBN 978-4-04-867170-5 (August 10, 2008)
  - Toradora9! ISBN 978-4-04-867265-8 (October 10, 2008)
  - Toradora Spinoff 2! Tora, Koyuru Aki ISBN 978-4-04-867459-1 (January 7, 2009)
  - Toradora10! ISBN 978-4-04-867593-2 (March 10, 2009)
  - Toradora Spinoff 3! Ore no Bentou Mite Kure ISBN 978-4-04-868456-9 (April 10, 2010)
- Golden Time (ゴールデンタイム) (under Dengeki Bunko, illustration by Ēji Komatsu)
  - Golden Time 1: A Blackout in Spring (ゴールデンタイム1: 春にしてブラックアウト, Gōruden Taimu 1: Haru ni Shite Burakkuauto) ISBN 978-4-04-868878-9 (September 10, 2010)
  - Golden Time 2: The Answer is YES (ゴールデンタイム2: 答えはYES, Gōruden Taimu 2: Kotae wa YES) ISBN 978-4-04-870381-9 (March 10, 2011)
  - Golden Time 3: Masquerade (ゴールデンタイム3: 仮面舞踏会, Gōruden Taimu 3: Kamen Butoukai) ISBN 978-4-04-870735-0 (August 10, 2011)
  - Golden Time 4: Don't Look Back (ゴールデンタイム4: 裏腹なるdon't look back, Gōruden Taimu 4: Urahara Naru don't look back) ISBN 978-4-04-886546-3 (March 10, 2012)
  - Golden Time Spinoff: Mr. Two Dimensions Special (ゴールデンタイム外伝: 二次元くんスペシャル, Gōruden Taimu Gaiden: Nijigen-kun supesharu) ISBN 978-4-04-886631-6 (June 10, 2012)
  - Golden Time 5: The Ghost of Summer, Japanese Summer (ゴールデンタイム5: ONRYOの夏 日本の夏, Gōruden Taimu 5: ONRYO no Natsu Nihon no Natsu) ISBN 978-4-04-886897-6 (September 10, 2012)
  - Golden Time Extra (ゴールデンタイム番外:百年後の夏もあたしたちは笑ってる, Gōruden Taimu Bangai: Hyakunengo no Natsu mo Atashitachi wa Waratteru) ISBN 978-4-04-891324-9 (January 10, 2013)
  - Golden Time 6: To Memories of Other Lives (ゴールデンタイム6: この世のほかの思い出に, Gōruden Taimu 6: Kono Yo no Hoka no Omoide ni) ISBN 978-4-04-891557-1 (April 10, 2013)
  - Golden Time Biographies: AFRICA (ゴールデンタイム列伝 AFRICA, Gōruden Taimu Retsuden: AFRICA) ISBN 978-4-04-891858-9, August 10, 2013
  - Golden Time 7: I'll Be Back (ゴールデンタイム7 I'll be back, Gōruden Taimu 7: I'll be back) ISBN 978-4-04-866059-4, October 10, 2013
  - Golden Time 8: Winter Journey (ゴールデンタイム8 冬の旅, Gōruden Taimu 8: Fuyu no Tabi) ISBN 978-4-04-866414-1 March 10, 2014
- Listening to the Soundtrack of an Unknown Movie (知らない映画のサントラを聴く) (under Shincho Bunko, illustrations by Haruaki Fuyuno) ISBN 978-4-10-180002-8 September 2014

Novels

- I Will Show You A Broken Place (砕け散るところを見せてあげる, Kudakechiru Tokoro o Misete Ageru) ISBN 978-4-10-180065-3 May 28, 2016 (Publisher Shinchousha)
- Tomorrow Leave Me Alone (あしたはひとりにしてくれ, Ashita wa Hitori ni Shite Kure) ISBN 978-4-16-790731-0 Nov 10, 2016 (Publisher Bungeishunjuu)
- I Will Ignite All Of You (おまえのすべてが燃え上がる, Omae no Subete ga Moeagaru) ISBN 978-4-10-180097-4 May 27, 2017 (Publisher Shinchousha)
- Answer me, Living Stars (応えろ生きてる星, Kotaero Ikiteru Hoshi) ISBN 978-4-16-790844-7 Nov 9, 2017 (Publisher Bungeishunjuu)
- Can You Breathe Here? (あなたはここで、息ができるの？, Anata Wa Koko De Iki Ga Dekiruno) ISBN 978-4103521112 Oct 10, 2018 (Publisher Shinchosha)
- That's Enough Just Stay Quiet! (いいからしばらく黙ってろ!, Ikara Shibaraku Damattero!) ISBN 978-4041089118 Feb 14, 2020 (Publisher KADOKAWA)
- My Playlist For Nights When My Heart Is Broken (心が折れた夜のプレイリスト, Kokoro ga Oreta Yoru no Playlist) ISBN 978-4101802152 March 27, 2021 (Publisher Shinchosha)

Manga

- Watashitachi no Tamura-kun (with artist Sachi Kurafuji)
- Toradora! (with artist Zekkyō)
- Golden Time (with artist Umechazuke)
- Evergreen (with artist Akira Kasukabe)

Games

- Noel (FlyingShine) (September 24, 2004)
