= Dengeki Comics =

Japanese manga publishing label

Dengeki Comics logo (top) and Dengeki Comics EX logo (bottom).

Dengeki Comics (電撃コミックス, Dengeki Komikkusu) is a manga publishing label affiliated with the Japanese publishing company ASCII Media Works (formerly MediaWorks) and is aimed at a male audience. Aside from the main Dengeki Comics label, there is the related Dengeki Comics EX label, which was launched in 1992, and the Dengeki Comics NEXT label, which was launched in 2013. A large amount of the manga published under Dengeki Comics was originally serialized in the manga magazine Dengeki Daioh.

== Manga published ==
=== Dengeki Comics ===
- A.D. Police
- Ano Natsu de Matteru
- Advance of Z
- Banner of the Stars
- Betterman
- Blood Alone
- Blue Drop
- Boogiepop Dual: Losers' Circus
- Bubblegum Crisis
- Chōjō Kidō Siren
- Chōkankaku Anal Man
- Comic Party
- Clannad
- Crest of the Stars
- D4 Princess
- Dejibara
- Doki Doki Time Toraburaa
- Doll Master
- Double Breed
- Ef: A Fairy Tale of the Two.
- Engeki Shōjo Inochi
- Fafner of the Azure
- Figure 17
- Futakoi Alternative
- G-On Riders
- Gakuen Utopia Manabi Straight!
- Gokudo
- Gunparade March
- Gunslinger Girl
- Happy Lesson
- Hayate X Blade
- Himawari Jigoku
- Himeyaka Himesama
- Houkago Play
- Infinite Ryvius
- Kagihime Monogatari Eikyū Alice Rondo
- Kamichu!
- Kanon
- Kashimashi: Girl Meets Girl
- Koharubiyori
- Kurogane Communication
- Kyōhaku Dog's
- Lunch Box
- Magical Play
- Maniac Road
- Marriage Royale
- Mobile Suit Gundam
- Mobile Suit Gundam 0079
- Mobile Suit Gundam 0083: Stardust Memory
- Mobile Suit Gundam Moon Crisis
- Mobile Suit Gundam MS Generation
- Mobile Suit Gundam Reon
- Mobile Suit Gundam Silhouette Formula 91
- MS Military History: Mobile Suit Gundam 0079 Supplementary Biography
- New MS Militar History: Mobile Suit Gundam 0079 Collected Short Stories
- Side Story of Gundam Z
- Murcurius Pretty
- Murder Princess
- Muv-Luv
- Muv-Luv Unlimited
- Na Na Na Na
- Otome wa Boku ni Koishiteru
- Please Teacher!
- Please Twins!
- Pretty Manizu
- Prism Ark
- Raimuiro Senkitan
- Renkin 3-kyū Magical ? Pokān
- Root Neko Neko
- Scape-God
- Shakugan no Shana
- Sister Princess Repure
- Sola
- Starship Operators
- Stellvia of the Universe
- Strawberry Marshmallow
- Strawberry Panic!
- Super Robot Wars
- Tengen Toppa Gurren Lagann
- Ticktack Gangan
- Train+Train
- To Aru Kagaku no Railgun
- To Heart 2
- To Heart
- To Heart: Remember My Memories
- Tsukihime
- Uchūjin Plume
- Uta Kata
- Watashitachi no Tamura-kun
- Yoake Mae yori Ruri Iro na
- Yotsuba&!
- Yume Mitai na Hoshi Mitai na
- Yumeria

=== Dengeki Comics EX ===
- Angel Foyson
- Azumanga Daioh
- Chronos Haze
- Dark Whisper
- Dragon Knight 4
- Godannar
- God Eater 2
- Gun Driver
- Gunbare! Game Tengoku
- Gunparade March
- Hexamoon Guardians
- Ichigeki Sacchu!! HoiHoi-san
- Iono-sama Fanatics
- Iguna Cross Reigōeki
- Kamikirimushi
- Kanna
- Kokoro Library
- Komorebi Namikimichi
- Kura Kura
- Lady Faust
- Little Busters!
- Lythtis
- Momoe Scythe
- Maromayu
- Murcurius Pretty
- Natural
- Ninin Ga Shinobuden
- Nocturne
- Pure Marioneeshon
- Ryūsei Suzumeshi Kirara Star
- Sekigan Jū Mission
- Senki to Kajitsu
- Sister Red
- Stratos 4
- The King of Braves GaoGaiGar
- Tsukigime Happy Apartment
- Yoiyami Gentō Sōshi
- Yūkyū Mokushiroku Eidoronjadoo
- Yuri Seijin Naokosan
- Zegapain

=== Dengeki Comics Next ===
- A Certain Scientific Accelerator
- A Certain Scientific Railgun: Astral Buddy
- Alderamin on the Sky
- And You Thought There Is Never a Girl Online?
- Angel's 3Piece!
- Tenshi no 3P! no 3P!!
- Black Bullet
- Between the Sky and Sea
- Bloom Into You
- Buddy Complex
- Buddy Complex: Coupling of Battlefield
- Charlotte
- Charlotte The 4-koma: Seishun o Kakenukero!
- Celestial Method
- Eromanga Sensei
- Etotama
- Gabriel DropOut
- Girlish Number
- Girls Beyond the Wasteland
- Hitori Bocchi no Marumaru Seikatsu
- Idol Incidents
- Kantai Collection: The perched naval base
- Kiznaiver
- Love Live! School Idol Diary
- Love Live! Sunshine!!
- Mitsuboshi Colors
- Nagi no Asukara 4-koma Gekijō: Nagiyon
- Nora to Ōjo to Noraneko Heart: Pirikara Yūsha Nobuchina
- Plastic Memories: Say to Good-bye
- Seishun Buta Yarō wa Bunny Girl-senpai no Yume o Minai
- Shirobako: Kaminoyama Kōkō Animation Dōkōkai
- Sword Art Online Alternative Gun Gale Online
- Tensei Shita Kūkan Mahōtsukai wa Shōtai Kakushite Medachitai!
- The Isolator
- This Art Club Has a Problem!
