= List of Blue Drop episodes =

The cover of the first DVD compilation released by King Records.

The episodes of the 2007 anime television series Blue Drop are based on the manga of the same name written by Akihito Yoshitomi, constituting a prequel to the manga. The episodes are directed by Masahiko Ohkura and animated by the Japanese animation studios Asahi Production and BeSTACK, with the 3D modeling done by Gonzo. The plot of the episodes follows Mari Wakatake's relationship with the enigmatic Hagino Senkōji, a member of an alien race known as the Arume, and the prelude to an invasion by the Arume.

The episodes aired from October 2, 2007, to December 25, 2007, on Chiba TV and KBS Kyoto, with AT-X, Mie TV, Tokyo MX TV, TV Kanagawa, TV Saitama, and TV Wakayama showing the episodes at later dates. The AT-X broadcast started much later than its counterparts, with the first episode airing in November, while most other stations started showing the episodes in October. Unlike most Japanese anime, the title of each episode is given in English. Each title is the name of a flower shown in that episode.

Two pieces of theme music are used for the episodes; one opening theme and one ending theme. The opening theme is "BLUE" by Japanese singer Suara, and another of her songs, "Tsubomi -blue dreams-" (蕾 -blue dreams-; lit. Flower bud -blue dreams-) is used as the closing theme. A single containing both songs was released on October 24, 2007.

Six DVD compilations have been planned for release by King Records, and the first compilation, composing the first three episodes of the anime, was released on December 26, 2007. D The second compilation, which contains the next two episodes of the anime, was released on January 23, 2008.

The anime has been licensed for release in North America by Sentai Filmworks and is distributed by Section23 Films. The subtitled complete collection was released on November 17, 2009. Sentai Filmworks and Section23 Films re-released the complete series with an English dub on September 7, 2010.

== Episode list ==
No.	Episode name	Subtitle	Original release date
1	Transliteration: "Hydrangea"	That Which Bears Water (水の入れ物, Mizu no Iremono; lit. Water's Container)	October 2, 2007
Teenage orphan Mari Wakatake is sent by her grandmother to the Kaihō Girls Academy, with Mari resentful at her enrollment. On the way, she sees a girl standing on a rock surrounded by birds. At the school, she meets the headmaster, and is subsequently shown around the school by Michiko Kōzuki, a student. The headmaster learns from Mari's attorney that Mari lost her memories after an incident in Kamioki Island five years prior which took the lives of her parents. In her dorm, Mari is greeted by Hiroko Funatsumaru, the dorm leader, Hagino Senkōji, who after shaking her hand, starts choking Mari, her eyes turning blue in the process. She relents and Mari furiously runs out the door. She is later comforted by Michiko, who recommends that Mari get to know Hagino. At dinner, however, Mari attacks Hagino, and during the night, follows Hagino outside, where a giant alien space ship rises from the water.
2	Transliteration: "Lavandula"	Doubt (疑念, Ginen)	October 9, 2007
Mari has a dream where she drowns next to the ship she saw the previous night, and is awakened by Michiko. While eating breakfast, Mari is scorned by Hagino's admirers, who have become resentful against her from the previous night. Outside, Hagino communicates with Tsubael, the operator of an Arume ship named Blue, who addresses Hagino as her superior. In school, Mari is welcomed by her class, although she finds sitting next to Hagino intolerable. Back in their dorm, Hagino arranges for her to be in the same room as Mari, much to Mari's distress. When a hologram of Tsubael appears and speaks to Hagino, Mari sees it, and when Hagino touches Mari, Hagino begins screaming in pain.
3	Transliteration: "Datura"	False Charm (偽りの魅力, Itsuwari no Miryoku)	October 16, 2007
Another Arume ship begins to inquire as to the presence of Hagino's ship, and as a result, Tsubael poses as Hagino's parent to allow Hagino to return to her craft, Blue. At school, Yūko Sugawara, Mari's homeroom teacher, causes a scandal when she is given a ride by the headmaster, and is forced to deal with the catcalls of the student body. During classes, Mari daydreams about Hagino. When Mari and Michiko return to the dorm, Mari is forced to help with the monthly student cooking session, and her lack of cooking skills creates a disaster. As she goes to bed, Mari thinks of Hagino, as Hagino reminisces in Blue. Hagino then surfaces Blue to meet her superior's vessel.
4	Transliteration: "Dahlia pinnata"	Uneasiness (不安, Fuan; lit. Uncertainty)	October 23, 2007
Hagino reports to her "Master Commander" Shivariel, who addresses Hagino as "Ekaril," that she was out of contact for five years due to a malfunction in Blue's Emiru Force Drive. She explains this was the cause of the incident in Kamioki Island, in which one of her crew members died, along with the Arume landing party and all of the island's inhabitants except Mari. Azanael, a crew member on Shivariel's ship who lost her lover Onomil in the incident, attempts to attack Hagino, but is restrained. At the school, Mari talks with Michiko, who reveals that she writes stories to fully express herself. Akane Kawashima, an upperclassman, treats the two to lunch in the town, where she reveals her ambition to become a cook and asks Mari to be more open with Hagino. However, Mari is kidnapped by thugs just as Shivariel dispatches a probe to retrieve Mari, whom she is interested in. However, Hagino destroys the probe, causing a tearful Mari to embrace her in response.
5	Transliteration: "Garden verbena"	Bonds: Parent and Child (親子の絆, Oyako no Kizuna; lit. Parent-child bond)	October 30, 2007
In the dorm, Hagino and Tsubael explain their Arume nature to a perplexed Mari. Later at school, Yūko attempts to ask Michiko to write a script for the school festival, and Mari later pushes her to do so. Shivariel dispatches a ship to attack Blue, which is barely able to survive the subsequent assault. In his office, the headmaster collapses and is sent to the hospital, and Akane, the headmaster's daughter, is pressed to visit him by Mari. As Akane prepares to leave, she is discovered by Hagino, and Mari, Michiko, and Hiroko attempt to cover for her. Mari then tells Hagino that she helped Akane because she wanted to help her be with someone important to her. As the group sleeps, Tsubael manages to critically damage the opposing ship under Hagino's instructions, and afterward, Hagino reflects on Mari's statement about having someone important in one's life.
6	Transliteration: "Campanula"	Little Eyes (小さな瞳, Chiisana Hitomi)	November 6, 2007
Mari fails the semester exam and is forced to study with Yūko in order to prepare for the exam. Mari studies diligently and extracts a promise from Yūko to join her at the fireworks festival if she passes. Due to Hagino's insubordination, Shivariel sends two ships to destroy Blue. Meanwhile, Mari overhears that Yūko is a special investigator attempting to uncover Mari's memories of the incident five years prior. She runs away into the woods followed by Yūko, and the two are attacked by Azaneal. Hagino arrives and defeats Azaneal, just as Tsubael has Blue cripple its opponents. Following this, Mari asks Yūko to stay at the school, even though Yūko was planning to leave due to her cover being blown.
7	Transliteration: "Crinum"	An Unsullied Heart (穢れない心, Kegarenai Kokoro)	November 13, 2007
Mari, Hagino, Michiko, and Akane go to Hiroko's house one day during the summer vacation, and enjoy swimming in the ocean. However, when Hagino goes to retrieve a shell, it begins raining, and Mari desperately calls out for Hagino. Meanwhile, Hiroko's pregnant sister goes into labor, and the four girls are forced to take care of Hiroko's baby niece in the process. Although they encounter problems, such as changing the baby's diaper and feeding her, they manage to calm her. Later, Hagino gives Tsubael the shell she found as a gift. As Hiroko returns to the house to retrieve the baby, she finds the four girls asleep, Mari and Hagino next to one another.
8	Transliteration: "Hyoscyamus niger"	Crushing Emotions (打ち破る思い, Uchiyaburu Omoi; lit. Broken Feelings)	November 20, 2007
Michiko begins to have increasing pressure put on her to finish the script for the school festival, and she is still unable to write anything. Meanwhile, Tsubael takes a tour through Hagino's dorm and is exasperated at the activities humans indulge in. On Hagino's orders, she allows Azanael out of her cell, and Azanael goes to Onomil's room. Afterward, Tsubael shows her a recording of Onomil's last moments: she sacrifices her life to save the ship for Hagino's sake. Michiko finally succumbs to stress and runs away, and when she returns, collapses while apologizing to Yūko. While in bed, she sees Mari, Hagino, and Tsubael walking together, and is inspired to start writing the play.
9	Transliteration: "Lagenaria siceraria"	Nighttime Memories (夜の思い出, Yoru no Omoide)	November 27, 2007
Mari wakes Michiko in the morning after she finished most of the script, and her script is received well by the class. To gather materials, Mari and Hagino go into town to purchase them. Meanwhile, Azanael watches them with Tsubael, incredulous as to Hagino's objectives. After finishing, Mari and Hagino go on the ferris wheel, where Mari asks Hagino if they can walk home. As they do so, Mari is injured and due to the rain, the two stay in an abandoned restaurant for the night. Mari and Hagino huddle together under a blanket, and Mari remembers that Hagino saved her life five years prior. However, as Mari tearfully embraces Hagino, Azanael is incensed that Hagino saved Mari's life instead of Onomil's.
10	Transliteration: "Cirsium"	Revenge (復讐, Fukushuu)	December 4, 2007
Michiko finishes the script, and Yūko selects her to be the director of the play. As a result, she assigns the actors' roles, and Mari is uncomfortable in her part, especially after Hagino acts her part seemingly perfectly. Afterward, everyone in the dorm helps in preparing the props for the play, and Hagino, inspired by Michiko's statement to have the courage to be open, invites Mari onto Blue. After the two enjoy a ride, the ship begins to suffer system failure, and Azanael takes Mari away. However, Azanael reveals that Hagino was responsible for the deaths of everyone in the incident five years ago, including Mari's parents. As Azanael escapes, Mari stares blankly at a tearful Hagino.
11	Transliteration: "Thoroughwort"	Remembrance (あの日の記憶, Ano Hi no Kioku; lit. That Day's Memories)	December 11, 2007
Tsubael takes Mari back to the surface, and implores her not to blame Hagino. Back at the school, Mari finds that she lacks any drive to participate in the play, resulting in a furious reaction from Michiko. Meanwhile, Hagino weeps in Onomil's room, and is confronted with an image of her, who tells Hagino not to blame herself. Azanael then returns to Shivariel's ship, and finds that Shivariel is sending multiple ships to destroy Blue. At the school, Mari converses with Hagino's projection, and, after seeing Arume ships dot the sky, she elicits a promise from Hagino to return to finish their talk. However, their conversation is seen by Yūko. Hagino and Tsubael barely manage to survive the assault, with a key system coming online due to the phantom Onomil's efforts. At Shivariel's ship, Azanael discovers that the explosion on the Blue five years ago that killed Onomil was not an accident.
12	Transliteration: "Cosmos"	Exquisite Harmony (美しい調和, Utsukushii Chōwa)	December 18, 2007
As the students begin to prepare for the school festival, Hagino returns. The cast of the play then comes out in their costumes, and Michiko gains permission to prepare the hall overnight. Hagino is invited to Yūko's classroom, where Yūko confronts Hagino at gunpoint, and asks her intentions. Hagino reveals she wishes to protect the planet against the Arume invasion. On Shivariel's ship, Azanael accuses Shivariel of having deliberately caused the explosion of Blue's Emiru Force Drive, in order to cover up her test of a new thought-wave weapon on the Arume and humans upon Kamioki Island. Azanael attempts to assassinate Shivariel, but kills only a fake Shivariel created with her new weapon. Shivariel then uses the weapon to materialize Azanael's fears, allowing the crew to shoot her, but Azanael manages to escape. At the festival, Mari's grandmother arrives, and Mari tells her she has begun to realize why her grandmother sent her to the school. Afterward, Mari converses with Hagino, and after admonishing Hagino for not telling her about the explosion on Kamioki Island earlier, the two admit their love for one another.
13	Transliteration: "Rosmarinus"	A Drop in the Ocean (海の雫, Umi no Shizuku) (Note: Episode 13 aired in Japan without a subtitle.)	December 25, 2007
As Michiko adds the finishing touches to the play, Mari and Hagino, holding hands, approach her, and Michiko rejoices at the pair's reconciliation. Meanwhile, the Arume invasion of Earth begins, and the human military forces are overwhelmed, but Blue manages to destroy several Arume ships. At the school, the play begins; however, Shivariel starts to bomb the school. As the students evacuate, Hagino reveals she is an Arume to those present, and travels back to Blue. Blue is nearly destroyed in the subsequent onslaught of Arume ships, but is saved by Azanael. Mari runs to the docks to see Blue, and tearfully cries for Hagino as Blue flies off. Hagino ejects Tsubael from the ship and rams Shivariel's ship as it is about to fire its main weapon, destroying both ships. Hagino dies while reciting her lines from the play and her name, and Mari silently asks her sacrifice to be a sign of hope to the whole planet. Thirty years in the future, a shuttle containing Michiko approaches an Arume ship on a peace mission, while Michiko states that everything will be fine.
