= Yu Yagami =

Japanese manga artist

Yu Yagami 矢上裕
- Born: July 11, 1969 (age 57) Amagasaki, Hyōgo Prefecture, Japan
- Notable works: Those Who Hunt Elves

Yu Yagami (矢上 裕, Yagami Yū; born July 11, 1969 in Amagasaki, Hyōgo Prefecture, Japan) is a Japanese manga artist. He is best known for the manga Those Who Hunt Elves, which was adapted as an anime series. His works Those Who Hunt Elves, Dokkoida?!, Go West!, and Hikkatsu! Strike a Blow to Vivify have been licensed in English.

Yagami's works are predominantly comedy shōnen manga with science fiction or high fantasy settings—for example, Dokkoida?! is a superhero parody series and Go West! a western parody. Many feature protagonists that use martial arts, usually some form of karate, such as Junpei in Those Who Hunt Elves and Shota in Hikkatsu! Strike a Blow to Vivify). Yagami himself is a karate aficionado, and is a member of the Kendokai Karate-do. Most of his works are published by MediaWorks and serialized in their Dengeki Comic Gao! magazine.

== Works ==
=== Manga ===
Title	Serialized in	# Volumes	Years	Notes
Those Who Hunt Elves エルフを狩るモノたち (Erufu wo karu mono-tachi)	Dengeki Comic Gao!	21	1994–2002	Adapted as an anime by Group TAC. Published in English by ADV Manga.
Concerning That Adventurer Kiken その冒険者キケンにつき (Sono bōkensha Kiken ni tsuki)	Dengeki Comic Gao!	1	1997	Short story collection
Yagamiland Daily Special 日替わり矢上ランド (Higawari Yagami-rando)	Dengeki Comic Gao!	1	1998	Short story collection
Dokkoida?! 住めば都のコスモス荘・すっとこ大戦ドッコイダー (Sumeba miyako no kosumosu-sō · suttoko taisen dokkoidā)	Dengeki AniMaga (2000–2001); Dengeki Comic Gao! (2001–2004)	4	2000–2004	Written by Taro Achi, adapting the light novels. Adapted as an anime by Ufotable. Published in English by CMX.
Go West!	Dengeki Comic Gao!	4	2002–2004	Published in English by CMX.
Hikkatsu! Strike a Blow to Vivify ヒッカツ！ (Hikkatsu!)	Dengeki Comic Gao!	3	2005–2006	Published in English by Go! Comi.
Red Lightning 赤い稲妻 (Akai inazuma)	Weekly Shōnen Champion		2007	Short run
Those Who Hunt Elves Returns エルフを狩るモノたち リターンズ (Erufu wo karu mono-tachi ritānzu)	Dengeki Comic Gao!	1	2007–2008	
Those Who Chase the Butterfly アゲハを追うモノたち (Ageha o Ou Monotachi)	Young Ace (Kadokawa Shoten)	4	2009-	
Sorcerous Stabber Orphen Mubō-hen 魔術士オーフェン無謀編 (Majutsushi Ōfen Mubō-hen)			2018	Adaptation of the novels written by Yoshinobu Akita.

=== Illustrations ===
Yagami did the illustrations for Dokkoida?! (住めば都のコスモス荘・すっとこ大戦ドッコイダー, Sumeba miyako no kosumosu-sō · suttoko taisen dokkoidā), a series of six light novels by Taro Achi published by MediaWorks in the Dengeki Bunko imprint between 1999 and 2003.

== Style ==
Yagami's work in Those Who Hunt Elves is featured prominently in Volume 2 of the popular manga drawing instructional series How to Draw Manga, "Compiling Techniques". Several frames from the manga are held up as examples of good use of screentones.
