= Eat-Man =

Japanese manga series by Akihito Yoshitomi

- Cover of the first volume
- Manga
- Written by: Akihito Yoshitomi
- Published by: MediaWorks
- English publisher: NA: Viz Media (former)
- Magazine: Dengeki Comic Gao!
- Original run: January 27, 1996 – July 26, 2003
- Volumes: 19
- Anime television series
- Directed by: Koichi Mashimo
- Written by: Atsuhiro Tomioka
- Music by: Yuki Kajiura; Tomomasa Yoneda
- Studio: Studio Deen
- Licensed by: NA: Discotek Media
- Original network: TV Tokyo
- Original run: January 9, 1997 – March 27, 1997
- Episodes: 12
- Anime television series

Eat-Man '98
- Directed by: Toshifumi Kawase
- Written by: Atsuhiro Tomioka
- Music by: Yu Imai
- Studio: Studio Deen
- Licensed by: NA: Discotek Media
- Original network: TV Tokyo
- Original run: October 8, 1998 – December 23, 1998
- Episodes: 12
- Manga

Eat-Man: The Main Dish
- Written by: Akihito Yoshitomi
- Published by: Kodansha
- Magazine: Monthly Shōnen Sirius
- Original run: May 26, 2014 – June 26, 2019
- Volumes: 6
- Manga

Desert-Dessert from Eat-Man: The Over Order
- Written by: Akihito Yoshitomi
- Published by: Kodansha
- Magazine: Monthly Shōnen Sirius
- Original run: November 26, 2026 – scheduled
- Anime television series

Eat-Man: The Over Order
- Directed by: Shunji Ōga
- Written by: Akihito Yoshitomi
- Studio: Studio Cab
- Licensed by: Crunchyroll
- icon

Eat-Man (stylized as EAT-MAN) is a Japanese manga series written and illustrated by Akihito Yoshitomi. It was serialized in MediaWorks's Dengeki Comic Gao! monthly magazine from January 1996 to July 2003, and was collected in 19 volumes. In 1997, Studio Deen adapted the manga into a 12-episode anime television series, which was broadcast in Japan from January to March 1997 on TV Tokyo. A sequel series, titled Eat-Man '98, was also animated by Studio Deen and ran from October to December 1998. Both anime series are licensed in North America by Discotek Media, and the manga series was licensed by Viz Media before it was dropped. A second manga series, titled Eat-Man The Main Dish, was serialized in Kodansha's Monthly Shōnen Sirius magazine from May 2014 to June 2019. A new anime television series adaptation titled Eat-Man: The Over Order and produced by Studio Cab has been announced. A spin-off manga of the new anime, titled Desert-Dessert from Eat-Man: The Over Order, will begin serialization in Monthly Shōnen Sirius in November 2026.

== Plot ==
Eat-Man is a series of short, episodic stories about an "explorer" (a type of mercenary) named Bolt Crank who has the ability to eat virtually anything and then, at will, reproduce from his body the objects he's consumed. Eat-Man's world is a mix of high-tech futurist cyberpunk and fairy tale. The episodes take place in various worlds and in undefined times.

== Characters ==
=== Bolt Crank ===
Bolt Crank (ボルト・クランク, Boruto Kuranku) (voiced by Masashi Ebara), is the best "explorer" in the world. In the manga, "Explorers" are a kind of mercenary. Although mercenaries in the manga do any job, even assassinations, the explorers were employees with principles.

Bolt has a bizarre power, the ability to eat anything inorganic and then later recreate it (even fixing the item ingested) from any part of his body. The item usually comes out from his arms and hands, but sometimes can be created in other body areas, like his head, chest, or legs.

In the manga, it was implied that inside Bolt's body was actually a void of space. Objects that he's consumed float around in a seemingly endless space, much like the inside of Doraemon's fourth-dimensional pocket.

A man of few words, Bolt doesn't show his feelings and always keeps a cool head. However, his cynical personality and his "always get the job done" attitude can make him seem like a very cold and dark character but, in the end, he always finds a way to do the right thing. He never appears to look back on the past or regret it in any way.

Although Bolt's past remained a mystery in all the series, some stories gave clues about his past, including some characters that appeared in various episodes. The end of the manga series revealed a lot about who and what Bolt is, but his exact identity still remains a mystery.

Here are some hints in the series:

- Bolt never ages, but the end of the manga series revealed that he is biologically immortal (he does not age but can be hurt and/or killed).
- There is a character identical to Bolt called Leon. His creations include an gynoid (Stella) with human feelings who loved him (an antagonist of Bolt in various episodes, trying to transform all living things into machines) and a weird robot capable of assimilating any mechanical part (it has a parasitic relationship with Bolt and keeps annoying him in various episodes from inside his body). It is implied that Bolt is his clone, or he is cloned from Bolt.
- Other possible origins are shown in other stories, where Bolt "worked" in a research center that performed tests with human beings and created humans with odd powers, like an immortal woman (with instant regeneration), a girl that turns into a monster, and another girl that generates electricity. Bolt's job there remained unexplained, suggesting he was just another test subject.
- The series suggests he was created before the beginning of mankind. In a story about the downfall of two old winged races before mankind arrived (white and black winged from the same species, one called Angels and the other Demons, with the Demons ruling the world), there is a prophecy that said that, with a union of an Angel and a Demon, the world will be free from the rule of darkness, and be guided by "the one who eats" until the end of times.
- The final chapter heavily implies that he may actually be God himself, "the creator" as he is seen throughout his final adventure in the last volume consuming orbs of light given to him by a mysterious angel, which each contain the elements necessary to create a world (life, light, etc.) and at the end, he consumes death to complete the necessary ingredients, (who had taken physical form to hunt him down and kill him due to his agelessness being "unnatural") and at the end of the manga, creates a doorway in the middle of the desert and walks through it, ending the series as he walks into a new universe.

=== Other characters ===
The adventures in Eat-Man are usually unrelated. However, a few characters are recurring, especially in later volumes.

- Aimie: An old detective friend of Bolt. She's immortal due to experiments conducted on her as a child by a laboratory (which Bolt "worked at") that was trying to create superhumans. She investigated a series of murdered scientists, which turned out to be her quest for revenge against those who "created" her.
- Elena: A girl with the power to generate electricity from her body. She's the sister of Rivette and was once a girlfriend of Leon.
- Hard: Another explorer with a strong sense of justice. The mysterious ways of Bolt sometimes made him distrustful, believing Bolt to be his rival and enemy. Nevertheless, Hard admired Bolt as the greatest explorer, and always tried to follow in his steps.
- Leon: Bolt's lookalike, Leon has suggests that he's lived a very long time and, despite being his double, there's nothing to suggest that he possesses any of Bolt's abilities. Leon fell in love with Stella and after his death, he planned and succeeded in using Bolt to resurrect himself as a machine, in order to live with Stella for all eternity. To do this, he created Telomere to parasitize Bolt and convince him to eat and recreate him.
- Rain Boyer: Granddaughter of a famous explorer named Boyer, and heir to the all-powerful Boyer Sword. She dreamed of becoming an explorer like her father. She is shown as a young girl with little experience searching for the sword in volume one. Later in volume eight she reappears as an adult and a very skilled explorer with a little crush on Bolt.
- Rivette: A skilled explorer with the power to generate electricity from her body much like her sister. She was very cynical and interested only in money, at least on the surface. In truth, she was actually looking for her sister Elena, who was kidnapped when Rivette was only a child.
- Shadow: An assassin with a great deal of resentment towards Leon because of his relationship with Stella. When he first met Bolt he assumed he was Leon and wanted to make him suffer, no matter what. He dressed as Bolt and killed people, defaming his name and making Bolt wanted in various countries. He also seems to have some kind of psychic abilities.
- Stella: A woman who was madly in love with Leon. She was actually an gynoid created by him but went insane when he killed himself. She planned to convert all the humans into machines, as her plan to end mortality and performed twisted experiments to achieve that. She ultimately ended up living with a resurrected Leon as a machine for all eternity.
- Telomere: A parasitic machine created by Leon. It tricked Bolt into eating him, and then lived in Bolt's body as a parasite, constantly annoying him. His ultimate objective was to resurrect Leon, and convince Bolt to do his part in that plan. The resurrection involved Telomere eating Leon and using Bolt's powers to recreate him. He later dies due to Bolt completing his mission of stopping Stella. It has powers very similar to Bolt, allowing It to eating and recreating machines.
- Eurydice: A hacker girl, entitled herself as the "number one computer specialist" (Vol 11 page 4). She helped Bolt in many adventures, obtaining information and linking Bolt through virtual-reality networks.

== Anime series ==
A 12-episode anime television series adaptation was broadcast on TV Tokyo from January 9 to March 27, 1997, and was written and directed by Koichi Mashimo and animated by Studio Deen. The series featured music by Yuki Kajiura and was the first time Kajiura and Mashimo worked together and would work together for several more projects over the next several years. The series was very loosely based on the manga featuring Bolt Crank, voiced by Masashi Ebara, as the main character and keeping the fictional currency of Lido. The following year, a second 12-episode series, titled Eat-Man '98, was broadcast from October 8 to December 23, 1998, once again animated by Studio Deen and with Ebara reprising his role as Bolt Crank, but under the new direction by Toshifumi Kawase.

The first series was released in North America on an English-subtitled VHS by the Bandai Entertainment label Anime Village in 1999. Bandai Entertainment released the second series Eat-Man '98 on DVD in 2005, but only the first two episodes got dubbed into English. Discotek Media released both series on DVD with Japanese audio and English subtitles; the first series was released on December 6, 2016, and Eat-Man '98 on January 31, 2017.

A new anime television series adaptation titled Eat-Man: The Over Order was announced on September 10, 2026. The series will be produced by Hakuhodo DY Music & Pictures, animated by Studio Cab and directed by Shunji Ōga, with original manga creator Akihito Yoshitomi writing the scripts and doing original designs and Satoshi Hirayama designing the characters for animation. Ebara is again reprising his role as Bolt Crank. Crunchyroll will stream the series.

== Reception ==
Although the manga series was a success, the 12-episode anime series released by Studio Deen was highly criticized by fans of the manga because of the great differences between the manga and the anime. Almost all fantasy elements were removed from the anime, leaving a futuristic world. Bolt Crank's personality was very different from the manga. This Bolt showed more feelings, hated his explorer life, and desired to be a normal person. The magic crystal that appeared in the opening, the glass monoliths, the ever-floating ship known as "LAVION", and the afterlife dream in the 11th episode was never explained, creating a very bizarre and abstract atmosphere. Most of the episodes ended with unanswered questions. An Anime News Network review called the series very quirky and interesting and praised Yuki Kajiura's music. Due to the fans' dissatisfaction, a new season was released as Eatman '98 one year after, where most of the episodes were directly based on stories from the manga.

== Later appearance ==
The character of Bolt Crank made a guest appearance in Akihito Yoshitomi's later creation, Ray. The story is included under a special chapter, "Drop In", in Ray volume 5 from pages 167 to 190.
