= Grimmel =

Grimmel may refer to:

- Torben Grimmel, a Danish sport shooter
- Colonel Leland Grimmel, a character in the web television series Alpha House
- Grimmel, a fictional location in the manga The Wallflower
- Grimmel, the main antagonist of the 2019 animated film How to Train Your Dragon: The Hidden World
