= Dokkoida?! =

Japanese light novel series

- Cover of the first light novel

住めば都のコスモス荘·すっとこ大戦ドッコイダー (Sumeba Miyako no Cosmos-sō Suttoko Taisen Dokkoidaa)
- Genre: Science fiction, Comedy
- Light novel

Sumeba Miyako no Cosmos-sō
- Written by: Taro Achi
- Illustrated by: Yu Yagami
- Published by: ASCII Media Works
- Imprint: Dengeki Bunko
- Original run: 10 May 1999 – 10 September 2003
- Volumes: 6
- Manga
- Written by: Taro Achi; Yu Yagami
- Published by: MediaWorks
- English publisher: NA: CMX
- Magazine: Dengeki AniMaga; Dengeki Comic Gao!
- Original run: August 2000 – April 2004
- Volumes: 3
- Anime television series
- Directed by: Hitoyuki Matsui; Takuya Nonaka
- Studio: ufotable
- Licensed by: NA: Sentai Filmworks
- Original network: JAITS
- Original run: 5 July 2003 – 20 September 2003
- Episodes: 12

Dokkoida?!, known in Japan as Sumeba Miyako no Cosmos-sō Suttoko Taisen Dokkoidaa (住めば都のコスモス荘·すっとこ大戦ドッコイダー; lit. Living in the Cosmos House, Foolish Dokkoida's Great Battle), is a comedic Japanese light novel series about a boy, Suzuo Sakurazaki (桜咲 鈴雄, Sakurazaki Suzuo), who is hired by a preteen space alien girl, Tanpopo, to try out an experimental new suit developed by the intergalactic toy company that she works for. Suzuo agrees to work for her since he is unemployed and needs the job to pay the rent. The suit gives him super powers, with which he fights bad guys and people from rival intergalactic toy companies and organizations.

The novels were written by Taro Achi, with illustrations by Yu Yagami. The novels were adapted into a three-volume manga series with the same name, by the same authors and published by Dengeki Bunko, and an anime series, directed by Hitoyuki Matsui and Takuya Nonaka, produced by Ufotable, and aired by Mainichi Broadcasting System.

The Dokkoida anime was licensed by Geneon Entertainment for Region 1 distribution, and the manga adaptation was licensed by DC Comics under the CMX imprint; the original light novel series has not been licensed for distribution in North America. The anime series is now licensed by Sentai Filmworks and is currently streaming on HIDIVE.

== Episodes ==
No.	Title	Original release date
1	"Enter Dokkoida!"; Transliteration: "Dokkoidā Tōjō de dokkoi" (Japanese: ドッコイダー登場でドッコイ)	5 July 2003
2	"Purple Hair, How Hip Can Ya Get?"; Transliteration: "Ryūkōshoku wa Murasaki de dokkoi" (Japanese: 流行色は紫でドッコイ)	12 July 2003
3	"Dokkoida vs. Edelweiss!"; Transliteration: "Dokkoidā vs. Ēderuwaisu de dokkoi" (Japanese: ドッコイダーVSエーデルワイスでドッコイ)	19 July 2003
4	"The Strange Neighbor, Sayuri"; Transliteration: "Nazo no Jūnin 4gōshitsu no Hiyashinsu de dokkoi" (Japanese: 謎の住人4号室のヒヤシンスでドッコイ)	26 July 2003
5	"Mission: Allowance Increase"; Transliteration: "Kozukai Neage de dokkoi" (Japanese: 小遣い値上げでドッコイ)	2 August 2003
6	"The Pool Cycle Race"; Transliteration: "Pūru Sōdatsu Saikuru Rēsu de dokkoi" (Japanese: プール争奪サイクルレースでドッコイ)	9 August 2003
7	"Kurika's Dream"; Transliteration: "Kurika no Yume de dokkoi" (Japanese: 栗華の夢でドッコイ)	16 August 2003
8	"Little Sister Love"; Transliteration: "Imōto L.O.V.E. de dokkoi" (Japanese: 妹L~O~V~E~でドッコイ)	23 August 2003
9	"I Like It Hot"; Transliteration: "O-atsui no ga o-suki de dokkoi" (Japanese: お熱いのがお好きでドッコイ)	30 August 2003
10	"Mogumokkuru's Make-Over"; Transliteration: "Henge! Mogumokkuru de dokkoi" (Japanese: 変化!モグモッグルでドッコイ)	6 September 2003
11	"Cosmos House's Last Hour?"; Transliteration: "Kosumosu-sō Saigo no hi? de dokkoi" (Japanese: コスモス荘最後の日?でドッコイ)	13 September 2003
12	"Battle of Zealousness!"; Transliteration: "Nekketsu Batoru de dokkoi" (Japanese: 熱血バトルでドッコイ)	20 September 2003
