= Hannah Alcorn =

American voice actress (born 1990)

- Born: May 10, 1990 (age 34); Houston, Texas, United States
- Occupation: Voice actress
- Agent: Dean Panaro Talent

Hannah Alcorn (born May 10, 1990) is an American voice actress. She works in voice acting, appearing in English dubs for Japanese anime series, as well as movies and video games.

== Career ==
She began acting on stage at the age of 11 and has been working professionally since the age of 18. Hannah has recently ventured into the anime industry as a voice actress, and can be heard in her first two principal roles for ADV Films, the sweet-but-bumbling witch hunter Marin Nijihara in Magikano, and as the lead female character Sunako in the new Shinichi Watanabe comedy The Wallflower.

== Filmography ==
=== Anime ===
- Blue Drop - Michiko Kozuki
- Dragon Ball - Girl (ep. 26), Yamcha's Fanclub (ep. 44), Reporter (ep. 123) Blonde Woman (ep. 134) (Funimation Dub)
- Dragon Ball Z - Daughter (Ep. 21) (Funimation Dub)
- Hunter × Hunter (2011) - Female Receptionist (ep 29), Additional Voices
- Magikano - Marin Nijihara
- Outbreak Company - Luna (Ep. 10), Additional Voices
- Tears to Tiara - Riannon, Primula
- The Wallflower - Sunako Nakahara
- UFO Ultramaiden Valkyrie - Catgirl Weirdo

=== Live-action ===
- The Age of Shadows - Kim Sa-Hee

=== Video games ===
- Mary Skelter: Nightmares - Cinderella
- Mary Skelter 2 - Cinderella
- Mary Skelter: Finale - Cinderella
