= Blue Drop =

Japanese manga

- Blue Drop logo from the anime adaptation.

ブルー ドロップ (Burū Doroppu)
- Genre: Drama, Science fiction, Yuri
- Manga
- Written by: Akihito Yoshitomi
- Published by: MediaWorks
- Magazine: Dengeki Comic Gao!
- Original run: June 27, 2004 – December 27, 2005
- Volumes: 1
- Manga

Blue Drop: Tenshi no Bokura
- Written by: Akihito Yoshitomi
- Published by: Akita Shoten
- Magazine: Champion Red
- Original run: February 19, 2007 – January 19, 2008
- Volumes: 2
- Manga

Blue Drop: Tenshi no Itazura
- Written by: Akihito Yoshitomi
- Published by: Akita Shoten
- Magazine: Champion Red Ichigo
- Original run: June 5, 2007 – October 5, 2007
- Volumes: 2 one-shots
- Anime television series
- Directed by: Masahiko Ōkura
- Produced by: Yutaka Ohashi; Shinichi Nakamura; Fuminori Yamazaki; Keisuke Hori; Shigenori Iwase
- Written by: Natsuko Takahashi
- Music by: The Kintsuru
- Studio: Asahi Production; BeSTACK
- Licensed by: NA: Sentai Filmworks
- Original run: October 2, 2007 – December 25, 2007
- Episodes: 13
- Manga

Blue Drop: Maiorita Tenshi
- Written by: Akihito Yoshitomi
- Published by: Akita Shoten
- Original run: December 26, 2007 – May 21, 2008 (bundled with DVD volumes)
- Volumes: 6 chapters
- Manga

Blue Drop: Tenshi no Itazura
- Written by: Akihito Yoshitomi
- Published by: Akita Shoten
- Original run: May 23, 2008 – June 27, 2008 (bundled with drama CDs)
- Volumes: 2 one-shots

Blue Drop (ブルー ドロップ, Burū Doroppu) is a Japanese science fiction yuri manga created by Akihito Yoshitomi. It comprises five chapters that were serialized in the shōnen manga magazine Dengeki Comic Gao! from June 2004 to December 2005, and later collected into a single volume. In 2007, Yoshitomi began to work on a new Blue Drop manga, titled Blue Drop: Tenshi no Bokura (BLUE DROP ～天使の僕ら～), which was serialized in the manga magazine Champion Red between February 19, 2007, and January 19, 2008, with its 14 chapters later compiled into 2 volumes. Each volume contained a chapter of another series called Tenshi no Itazura (天使の悪戯, Angel's Trick) where Kasagi is a member of an alien race of females called the Arume. She spends her time playing matchmaker for unsuspecting, cute human girls. The third and fourth chapters were not released until 2008.

A Blue Drop anime series directed by Masahiko Ohkura and produced by Asahi Production and BeSTACK aired in Japan between October 2 and December 25, 2007, under the title Blue Drop: Tenshitachi no Gikyoku (BLUE DROP ～天使達の戯曲～). The first DVD release on December 26, 2007, was accompanied with a bonus 6-chapter manga volume called Maiorita Tenshi (〜舞い降りた天使〜, Descended Angel). In 2008, two drama CDs were released. The first, released on May 23, was titled Lover Side, and included the third chapter of Tenshi no Itazura. The second, released on June 27, was titled Traitor Side, and included the fourth and final chapter of the Itazura one-shot series.

All the Blue Drop stories revolve around a war between humanity and the Arume (アルメ), an alien race consisting solely of women. Both manga series are set after the war while the anime is set before. The two manga series feature some degree of sexual content; the second manga being considerably more explicit than the original one.

== Plot ==
The war against the Arume is set from 2000 to 2008, ending with the aliens winning the conflict. In 2009 the aliens take control of the Japanese government, which sets the backstory for the Blue Drop storylines.

=== Manga ===
The decisive factor in the Arume's victory is the use of biological weapons and a modified version of an alien toy called Emiru Force (エミル フォース, Emiru Fōsu). Along the years, the remnants of this weaponry have become dangerous creatures which the government (run by the aliens) has to deal with. This is the main premise of the original Blue Drop manga, which is set around a thousand years after the war. The military uses an experimental vaccine that gives human children special abilities for a determined period of time. During this time the military forces them to confront the weapon remnants, an action that usually ends up in the children's death. Most of the chapters follow the conflict between the military and the resistance, which tries to save those who have been given the vaccine, as well as the relationships between the people involved. In addition, the story introduces the aliens' traits and behavior. All of them have blue eyes and their blood turns milky white when it touches air, but their main characteristic lies in their gender: they are all female, and their sexual orientation is homosexual.

The aliens' sexual behaviour is dealt with even more prominently (and explicitly) in the Blue Drop: Tenshi no Bokura manga, which shows its consequences upon the human social structure. This manga also deals with the first experiments done on human beings by the aliens; specifically experiments concerning sex change. Set one year after the war, it focuses in the relationship between Shōta, a normal high-school student, and Kenzō, Shōta's former-male best friend who has been turned into a girl by the aliens.

=== Anime ===
Unlike both manga stories, the Blue Drop: Tenshitachi no Gikyoku anime series is set before the war. The storyline starts in 1999, with Mari Wakatake transferring to a girl's dormitory school called Kaihō Academy (海凰学園, Kaihō Gakuen). Mari's background hides a traumatic past: five years before her arrival at Kaihō, all the inhabitants of the island where she lived died in one night. Mari was the only survivor, but lost all her memories prior that point. At the academy, Mari meets Hagino Senkōji, the school idol and class rep. Although Hagino is introduced as a calm and collected person, when she touches Mari's hand she panics and attempts to strangle Mari. From then on, Mari is torn between anger and attraction towards Hagino, who pretends as if nothing had happened. Unknown to Mari, Hagino is actually the commander of an alien battleship called Blue, which is the vanguard of the invasion to Earth. The incident on the island where Mari lived occurred when the crew of the ship and the island's inhabitants killed each other. Blue was seriously damaged and hidden, and Hagino blended into human society and continued her reconnaissance.

The story focuses on the relationship between Mari and Hagino; as Mari begins to come out of her shell, Hagino, who has been living a double life, gradually begins to have doubts about her mission. While the invasion and war draw closer unnoticed, they begin to understand each other.

== Characters ==
Left: Yui. Right-top: Shōta and Kenzō. Right-bottom: Mari and Hagino.

Although most of the chapters in the original Blue Drop manga are auto-conclusive, the first recurrent character and main protagonist is Yui, an alien/human hybrid introduced as a member of the resistance. Because of her alien heritage, Yui possesses their characteristic blue eyes, the white-colored blood, and their sexual orientation. Other recurrent characters include Misato (美里), an alien initially introduced as a school nurse but later shown to be working for the military, and Shōko (称子), a high-school girl that Yui rescues from Misato.

Blue Drop: Tenshi no Bokura's main protagonist is Shōta Yanami (矢波 翔太, Yanami Shōta), a regular high-school student. At the beginning of the story, Shōta is met by a girl who asks him to have sex with her. Not much time passes until Shōta finds out this girl is actually Kenzō Sugiyama (杉山 健造, Sugiyama Kenzō), his former-male best friend, who has had his sex changed by the aliens and has been commanded to get pregnant.

The main characters in the Blue Drop: Tenshitachi no Gikyoku anime are Mari Wakatake (若竹 マリ, Wakatake Mari), voiced by Akiko Yajima (Japanese) and Hilary Haag (English), and Hagino Senkōji (千光寺 萩乃, Senkōji Hagino), voiced by Miyuki Sawashiro (Japanese) and Monica Rial (English). After the incident on the island, Mari is taken in by her grandmother, who has her educated by tutors at home. Eventually, knowing that she herself may not have long to live, her grandmother enrolls Mari in Kaihō Academy. Enrolled against her will, she misses her home, and can not hide her distress and anger. Hagino, on the other hand, is calm and collected, an excellent student, and an all-round athlete. Despite being very popular among her classmates, however, she never shows emotion, surrounding herself with an aura of mystery.

== Media ==
Left: single volume of the original Blue Drop manga. Right: first volume of the Blue Drop: Tenshi no Bokura manga.

=== Manga ===
Written and illustrated by Akihito Yoshitomi, the original Blue Drop manga was serialized in the Japanese shōnen magazine Dengeki Comic Gao!, published by MediaWorks. The manga was initially a collection of five one-shot stories: the first chapter was called Kaijin (海人), and was published on June 27, 2004; the second chapter followed on December 27, 2004, under the title Kaminoko (神子); the third release was on July 27, 2005, and was titled Blue Drop: Kowareta Tenshi (BLUE DROP ～壊れた天使～); the fourth chapter, called Blue Drop: Tenshi no Yakusoku (BLUE DROP ～天使の約束～), was released on October 27, 2005; and the final one, Blue Drop: Tenshi no Sentaku (BLUE DROP ～天使の選択～), was published on December 27, 2005. The five chapters were later collected into a single bound volume which went on sale on January 27, 2006. In the volume release, the order of the chapters was altered: Kaminoko was first, followed by Kowareta Tenshi, then Kaijin, Tenshi no Yakusoku, and finally Tenshi no Sentaku.

Yoshitomi's second Blue Drop manga, titled Blue Drop: Tenshi no Bokura, was serialized in the magazine Champion Red (published by Akita Shoten) between February 19, 2007, and January 19, 2008. Subsequently, a two-chapter story called Blue Drop: Tenshi no Itazura (BLUE DROP ～天使の悪戯～) (also by Yoshitomi) was published in Champion Red's sister magazine Champion Red Ichigo; the first chapter being released on June 5, 2007, and the second one on October 5, 2007. The first part was later included as a special chapter in the first volume of Blue Drop: Tenshi no Bokura, which was released on September 20, 2007. The second part was included in the second (and last) volume of Blue Drop: Tenshi no Bokura, released on March 19, 2008.

=== Radio drama ===
A Blue Drop radio drama was broadcast in Japan from July to September 2007. The drama aired every Monday on fm osaka, starting at 12:30 AM and running for twenty-eight minutes at a time. It focused on the original manga's storyline and featured Kaori Nazuka as Yui, Mami Kosuge as Misato, and Ryoko Nagata as Shōko. The radio drama was released as two drama CDs called Blue Drop vol.1 Lovers Side and Blue Drop vol.2 Traitor Side, on May 23 and June 27, 2008, respectively.

=== Anime ===
Blue Drop: Tenshitachi no Gikyoku official poster

After a year and a half of planning, Asahi Production and BeSTACK produced the Blue Drop anime series. Directed by Masahiko Ohkura, the show aired in Japan between October 2, 2007, and December 25, 2007, containing thirteen episodes. The series featured character design by Itsuko Takeda, series composition by Natsuko Takahashi, and screenplay by Akihito Yoshitomi and Masahiko Ohkura themselves. 3D modeling was done by studio Gonzo.

The soundtrack was composed by The Kintsuru, providing mostly orchestral music, with violin and piano pieces. The opening and ending themes, "Blue" and "Tsubomi -blue dreams-" (蕾-blue dreams-), were performed by Suara. A single containing both songs was released on October 24, 2007.

The anime has been licensed for release in North America by Sentai Filmworks and is distributed by Section23 Films. The complete collection was released on November 17, 2009, with English subtitles. Sentai Filmworks re-released Blue Drop with a dub on DVD on September 7, 2010. The Anime Network began airing the dub of Blue Drop on Anime Network On Demand on July 22, 2010, and on the Anime Network Online Player on July 23, 2010.

==== Voice cast ====
| Character Name | Japanese Voice Actor | English Voice Actor |
|---|---|---|
| Mari Wakatake | Akiko Yajima | Hilary Haag |
| Hagino Senkōji/Ekaril | Miyuki Sawashiro | Monica Rial |
| Michiko Kōzuki | Satsuki Yukino | Hannah Alcorn |
| Akane Kawashima | Akeno Watanabe | Tiffany Grant |
| Yuko Sugawara | Miho Yamada | Luci Christian |
| Tsubael | Yūko Gotō | Brittney Karbowski |
| Hiroko Funatsumaru | Kimiko Saitō | Shannon Emerick |
| Shivariel | Yōko Asagami | Laura Chapman |
| Azanael | Ai Orikasa | Kelly Manison |

== Reception ==
Reviews were generally positive. Allen Moody of T.H.E.M. Anime Reviews praised the series for its visual design, interesting technology, strong dramatic aspects, the sequence in one of the episodes where Hagino invites Mari aboard her ship, and "really nice quiet moments" between Hagino and Mari. However, he argued that more time in the anime could have been used to "develop the Mari/Hagino relationship" or the backstory of Hagino and Ekaril, and wished that the ending has been less conventional. Theron Martin of Anime News Network argued that the series resembled Darker than Black with its "common gimmicks and story elements" like lesbian love, a play, and lost memory. Even so, he argued that the show succeeds because it is "more about the characters than the gimmicks," is a "low-key series" and called it a "nearly-overlooked gem of a story" which will not have as big of an audience as it should have.
