= Kaze no Hana =

Japanese manga series

- Cover of the first volume of the manga

風ノ華 〜魔龍八剣伝〜 (Kaze no Hana – Maryū Hakkenden)
- Genre: Action, Adventure, Comedy
- Manga
- Written by: Akiyoshi Ohta
- Illustrated by: Ushio Mizta
- Published by: MediaWorks
- English publisher: NA: Yen Press
- Magazine: Dengeki Comic Gao!
- Original run: 2004 – 2005
- Volumes: 3

Kaze no Hana (Japanese: 風ノ華 〜魔龍八剣伝〜, Hepburn: Kaze no Hana – Maryū Hakkenden; lit. 'Flower of the Wind') is a Japanese manga series that was written by Akiyoshi Ohta, and was illustrated by Ushio Mizta. It consists of three volumes released in Japan by MediaWorks and was licensed and released in English by Yen Press.

== Plot ==
Orphaned four years ago by an accident that took her parents and her memory, 16-year-old Momoka Futami travels to Mitsurugi City upon receiving an invitation from the Mitsurugi House, her father's very powerful relatives who offer to take her in. What awaits her far exceeds her fears and expectations-a spiritual sword, Suzukaze, and a tumultuous battle. The Purification, a pillar replacement ceremony, has begun, but the Mitsurugi Clan loses their spiritual swords to Keiya Mano, a member of the Shichou Group. Upon learning that she holds the key to regain the spiritual swords, Momoka becomes overwhelmed by the pressure and runs away. However, with Shouta's encouragement, she decides to face her enemy and her destiny head-on

== Characters ==
Momoka Futami
Orphaned four years ago by an accident that took her parents and her memory, 16-year-old Momoka Futami travels to Mitsurugi City upon receiving an invitation from the Mitsurugi House, her father's very powerful relatives who offer to take her in. What awaits her far exceeds her fears and expectations-a spiritual sword, Suzukaze, and a tumultuous battle.
Shouta Ichijou
Momoka's roommate
