= Hilary Haag =

American voice actress

- Born: San Antonio, Texas, U.S.
- Education: Texas A&M University
- Occupation: Voice actress
- Years active: 1996–present
- Spouse: David Scarborough
- Relatives: Quentin Haag (brother)

Hilary Haag (/heɪɡ/) is an American voice actress. Haag has been involved in several lead roles in anime series, including Nene Romanova in Bubblegum Crisis Tokyo 2040, Teletha Testarossa in the Full Metal Panic series, Seth Nightroad in Trinity Blood, Rebecca Miyamoto in Pani Poni Dash!, Mari Wakatake in Blue Drop, Rosette Christopher in Chrono Crusade, Chloe in Noir, and Katyusha in Girls und Panzer.

Because of her distinctive child-like natural voice, she is often given the roles of younger female characters.

== Biography ==
She attended Lamar Consolidated High School and later studied English Rhetoric at Texas A&M University. Haag resided in Los Angeles for almost 2 years after she graduated from Texas A&M University, but moved back to Houston where she grew up.

== Filmography ==
=== Anime ===
List of voice performances in anime
Year	Title	Role	Notes	Source
1996	Martian Successor Nadesico	Yukina Shiratori		
1999	Weird Anime Excel Saga	Menchi		
1999	Bubblegum Crisis: Tokyo 2040	Nene Romanova		
2000	Gensomaden Saiyuki	Lirin		
2001	Princess Nine	Ryo Hayakawa		
2002	Chance Pop Session	Yuki Aoyama		
2002	Steel Angel Kurumi	Karinka	Also season 2	
2003	Full Metal Panic! series	Teletha Testarossa	Also season 2, OVAs, Fumoffu and Invisible Victory	
2003	Noir	Chloe		
2003	Sorcerous Stabber Orphen	Dortin	Also season 2	
2004	Chrono Crusade	Rosette Christopher		
2004	Super Milk Chan	Milk		
2004	DN Angel	Riku Harada		
2005	Ghost Stories	Satsuki Miyanoshita		
2005	Trinity Blood	Seth Nightroad	Funimation	
2005	Godannar	Anna Aoi		
2005	Wandaba Style	Kiku #8		
2006	Pani Poni Dash!	Rebecca "Becky" Miyamoto		
2007	Best Student Council	Kaori Izumi		
2007	Magikano	Fuyuno Yoshikawa		
2008	Devil May Cry: The Animated Series	Patty Lowell		
2010	Clannad series	Fuko Ibuki	Also season 2	
2010	Blue Drop	Mari Wakatake		
2010	Canaan	Maria Osawa		
2010	Hakuoki	Princess Sen (Senhime)		
2011	Angel Beats!	Yui		
2011	Battle Girls: Time Paradox	Ieyasu Tokugawa		
2012	Ef series	Mizuki Hayama	A Tale of Memories and A Tale of Melodies	
2012	Infinite Stratos series	Lingyin Huang	Also season 2 and OVA	
2012	Heaven's Memo Pad	Yuko "Alice" Shionji		
2012	The World God Only Knows series	Mio Aoyama, Shiori Shiomiya, Minerva	Also season 3	
2013	Campione!	Yuri Mariya		
2013	Girls und Panzer	Katyusha		
2013	Inu x Boku Secret Service	Ririchiyo Shirakin		
2013	Kamisama Dolls	Utao Kuga		
2013	Kill Me Baby	Yasuna Oribe		
2013	Log Horizon	Serara	Also seasons 2 and 3	
2014	Medaka Box series	Hansode Shiranui	Also season 2	
2015	Leviathan: The Last Defense	Bahamut		
2015, 2017	Is It Wrong to Try to Pick Up Girls in a Dungeon?	Liliruca Arde		
2016	Chaika - The Coffin Princess	Frederica	Season 2	
2016	Dennō Coil	Yuko "Yasako" Okonogi		
2016	Little Busters! EX	Saya Tokido		
2017	Monster Musume	Lilith	Credited as "Mina Getois"	
2018	Food Wars!: Shokugeki no Soma	Lucie Hugo	Season 2	
2019	How Clumsy you are, Miss Ueno	Ueno		
2019	Waiting in the Summer	Kanna Tanigawa		
2019	Domestic Girlfriend	Momo Kashiwabara		
2019	Manaria Friends	Lou		
2019-2020	My Youth Romantic Comedy Is Wrong, As I Expected	Komachi Hikigaya		
2020	BanG Dream!	Chiyu Tamade	Season 2	
2020	After the Rain	Fu/Mukihiko		
2020	The Pet Girl of Sakurasou	Kanna Hase		
2020	The Demon Girl Next Door	Ryoko Yoshida		
2020	Wasteful Days of High School Girls	Saku "Loli" Momoi		
2020	Shirobako	Ai Kunogi		
2022	Kakegurui ××	Erimi Mushibami	Sentai Filmworks dub	
2023	Farming Life in Another World	Leezay		
2023	The Dangers in My Heart	Kanaoya		
2023	Love Flops	Sod		
2024	Jellyfish Can't Swim in the Night	Chiepi		
2024	Insomniacs After School	Nono		
2025	Loner Life in Another World	Elf		
2025	Bad Girl	Maria Komari		
2025	Hero Without a Class: Who Even Needs Skills?!	Astea		

=== Film ===
List of voice performances in films
Year	Title	Role	Notes	Source
2005	The Place Promised in Our Early Days	Female student, Nurse, TV Announcer		
2008	5 Centimeters Per Second	Akari Shinohara		
2011	Loups Garous	Mio Tsuzuki		
2011	Mardock Scramble series	Rune Balot		
2012	Children Who Chase Lost Voices	Asuna Watase		
2012	Towa no Quon series	Miu		
2016	Girls und Panzer der Film	Katyusha		
