= Those Who Hunt Elves =

Japanese manga series

- English release Volume 1 – Ready, Set, Strip!

エルフを狩るモノたち (Erufu wo karu mono-tachi)
- Genre: Adventure, comedy, fantasy
- Manga
- Written by: Yu Yagami
- Published by: MediaWorks
- English publisher: NA: ADV Manga
- Magazine: Dengeki Comic Gao!
- Original run: March 1994 – January 2003
- Volumes: 21 + DX
- Anime television series
- Directed by: Kazuyoshi Katayama
- Written by: Masaharu Amiya
- Studio: Group TAC
- Licensed by: NA: Sentai Filmworks
- Original network: TV Tokyo
- English network: US: Anime Network
- Original run: October 4, 1996 – December 19, 1996
- Episodes: 12
- Anime television series

Those Who Hunt Elves 2
- Directed by: Hiroshi Fukutomi
- Written by: Masaharu Amiya
- Studio: Group TAC
- Licensed by: NA: Sentai Filmworks
- Original network: TV Tokyo
- English network: US: Anime Network
- Original run: October 2, 1997 – December 18, 1997
- Episodes: 12
- Manga

Those Who Hunt Elves Returns
- Written by: Yu Yagami
- Published by: MediaWorks
- Magazine: Dengeki Comic Gao!
- Original run: November 2007 – March 2008
- Volumes: 1
- Manga

Those Who Hunt Elves 2
- Written by: Yu Yagami
- Published by: Flex Comix
- Magazine: Comic Meteor
- Original run: January 2013 – January 2018
- Volumes: 10
- icon

Those Who Hunt Elves (Japanese: エルフを狩るモノたち, Hepburn: Erufu o Karu Mono-tachi) is a Japanese manga series written and illustrated by Yu Yagami. The plot revolves around three travelers, the eponymous "Elf Hunters", and the elven sorceress Mistress Celcia. The anime was released in North America on VHS and DVD by ADV Films and later re-released by Sentai Filmworks.

On June 12, 2015, the Chinese Ministry of Culture listed Those Who Hunt Elves among 38 anime and manga titles banned in China.

== Plot ==
Elf Hunters seek five spell fragments that have been placed on the skin of elves, similar to tattoos, throughout the magical world they have been transported to. When they find them, they will be able to return to Japan.

The Elf Hunters travel by means of a Type 74 tank, which has been transported to the magical world with them.

The reaction of various elves as the team attempts to strip them naked is a primary basis for much of the show's humor, and are more ridiculous than suggestive. The series is also known for breaking the fourth wall, mostly by Junpei.

== Characters ==
=== Elf Hunters ===
Junpei Ryuzouji (龍造寺淳平, Ryūzōji Junpei)
Voiced by: Tomokazu Seki (Japanese); Andrew Klimko (English)
A 19-year-old karateka and strongman with incredible fighting ability, Junpei is the muscle of the group as well as being the only male. However, his rather rough way of saying things as well as his eye for beautiful women get him into trouble more often than not. He is constantly arguing with Celcia and obsessed about curry and, briefly, heliocentrism. Junpei abhors fantasy stories and might be atheist or agnostic. He is infatuated with Airi but is clueless to Celcia's own feelings for him despite their constant bickering. Junpei carries a wallet filled with membership cards from various dojos, and a condom with the words "Use with Airi Only!" written on the wrapper.
Ritsuko Inoue (井上律子, Inoue Ritsuko)
Voiced by: Yūko Miyamura (Japanese); Rozanne Curtis (English)
A 16-year-old high school girl and military otaku. She's a tomboy but not to the point where she loses her femininity. She drives and maintains the tank (to which she has a strong attachment) and also acts as a sniper from time to time; she often sets landmines and booby traps. Despite her love of modern military hardware, Ritsuko also displays a more sensitive and innocent side: she falls in love with the cute Pichi and maintained a belief in Father Christmas long after her peers had abandoned it and is also frightened to death of ghosts. Over the course of the manga, she gradually falls in love with Junpei. Ritsuko carries a Howa Type 64 battle rifle, SIG SG 550 assault rifle, SIG P226 and Heckler & Koch USP semiautomatic pistols, G36 assault rifle, PSG1 sniper rifle, a sheath knife, some C4 and a Colt M16A2 assault rifle. She also speaks fluent English and German.
Airi Komiyama (小宮山愛理, Komiyama Airi)
Voiced by: Michie Tomizawa (Japanese); Kelly Manison (English)
A 24-year-old talented Japanese-American actress, Airi is as skilled as she is beautiful. Able to cut from one emotion to another in an instant, and even disguise herself as someone else, Airi's talents come in handy for getting out of sticky situations that require trickery rather than brute force. Airi also has an ability to quickly and accurately assess any given situation and to plan for its eventual outcome. Although aware of Junpei's blatant affections for her, she does not reciprocate (although she does use them to her advantage, for example when getting Junpei to volunteer to be live bait to catch a giant shark by saying "Pretty please"). Airi carries a katana and a make-up compact kit.
Mistress Celcia Marie Claire (セルシア·マリクレール, Serushia Marikurēru)
Voiced by: Kotono Mitsuishi (Japanese); Jessica Calvello (English) for Season 1 and Shelley Calene-Black (English) for Season 2
The unfortunate elf who happens to get tied up with her world's new visitors, Celcia offers to transport Junpei and the others back with a spell, but gets distracted in the process and causes her spell book pages to be spread out all over the world. She is a bit of a ditz and a bit psychotic and is constantly at odds with Junpei, but she is just as determined to get him and his friends back to their own world as they are – even despite her own feelings for Junpei (who she's actually in love with but publicly butts heads with). Generally, she wants them to get back home because they tend to cause a LOT of trouble. During the efforts to retrieve the spell fragments, Celcia displays an uncanny knack for getting stuck in animal form – first as a dog (Pochi), into which she'd willingly transformed, and secondly into a panda. The reason for her retention of these forms is that it is she who recovers spell fragments from the bodies of other elves, only for them to become cloven to her. Unfortunately, if they become cloven to her while she is in another form, it traps her in that form. Also, some of these marks are rather annoying. One, for instance, is a goofy looking black eye; another gives her a set of whiskers.
Mihke (ミケ, Mike)
Voiced by: Eriko Kawasaki (Japanese); Joe Jaworski (English) for Season 1 Eps. 5–9 and Christopher Bourque (English) Season 1 Eps. 10–12, Tiffany Grant (English) for Season 2
The Type 74 tank is possessed during the show by the spirit of a cat known as Mihke. Mihke is first met by Elf Hunters possessing a giant teddy bear, which is then attacked by villagers, who explain that the spirit has been harassing them for some time. Upon the destruction of the bear, the spirit possesses a toy dog, found floating in a river by Ritsuko, before this too is destroyed.
Pichi (ピチちゃん, Pichi-chan)
Voiced by: Tomoko Kawakami (Japanese); Tiffany Grant (English)
A small, white, teddy bear-like interdimensional creature with the ability to produce toilet paper, to whom Ritsuko takes a liking. Pichi ends up proving an incentive for the group, especially due to a plot involving a scarcity of toilet tissue.

=== Supporting ===
Annette (アネット, Anetto)
Voiced by: Tomoko Kawakami (Japanese); Melissa Cybele-Sparks (English)
A priestly elf and acolyte of Celcia who often appears during the group's adventures. Early in the series, she loses her faith and trust in Celcia for she thought she'd betrayed the elven race for helping out Those Who Hunt Elves and sought to stop TWHE by using a powerful spell, but ended up opening a portal and bringing more earth-originated material through. Subsequently, she ended up stripped naked and flowing down a river attached to a log. Despite this, she is later seen as a major supporter of Elf Hunters efforts to return to Japan. Probably because this is the best way to stop them.
Einal (エイナル, Einaru)
Voiced by: Motomu Kiyokawa (Japanese), Bob Elliott (English) for Season 1 and Rob Bundy for Season 2
Beenal (ビイナル, Bīnaru)
Voiced by: Cha Fu Rin (Japanese); Lew Temple (English) for Season 1 and Randy Sparks (English) for Season 2
They are the two Elven Bishops, with whom Annette and Celcia often consort and often disagree.
Emily (エミリィ, Emirī)
Voiced by: Tomoko Kawakami (Japanese); Heather Bryson-LeMaster (English)
An elven wind-priestess. She initially mistakes TWHE as the Legendary Trio when Hammerhead and his pirate crew raid her village.
Andy
Voiced by: Takehito Koyasu (Japanese); Randy Sparks (English)
An inhabitant of Emily's village.
Bronco
Voiced by: Fujiko Takimoto (Japanese); Kurt Stoll (English)
Andy's younger brother.
Hammerhead
Voiced by: Motomu Kiyokawa (Japanese); Brett Weaver (English)
Leader of a group of anthropomorphic sea creatures who hunt elves to sell as stuffed hunting trophies. They prove to be no match for Junpei's fighting skills, Ritsuko's weaponry and the T-74 Tank's gun.
Gabriella
Voiced by: Eiko Yamada (Japanese); Kim Sevier (English)
An Amazon-like female elf. Her forces would be effortlessly defeated by Those Who Hunt Elves and she herself would fall to Junpei. After which she develops feelings for him for his honor as a fighter.
Dihal
Voiced by: Hiromi Tsuru (Japanese); Rebecca Connelly (English)
A female elf and leader of a town beset by skeletal warriors, she drinks a magic potion which causes her to grow, thus enabling Elf Hunters to search her naked frame. She spends the rest of the episodes in her giant form.
Rapier
Voiced by: Minami Takayama (Japanese); Laura Chapman (English)
A female elf and accomplished fighter, cursed with the numbers of her defeated rivals on her back. It can't come off until she's defeated her 1,000th opponent. She would fall to Junpei but was relieved of her curse because she learned the true way of the fist that her late sensei taught her but refused to listen. She thanks him and Junpei for relieving her of the curse.
Sister Romina
Voiced by: Kanako Tanaka (Japanese); Kira Vincent-Davis (English)
An elven nun.
Emmy
Voiced by: Minako Ito (Japanese); Amy Jackson (English)
A ghostly elf who claims to be a lesbian to keep Junpei from stripping her.
Pierre
Voiced by: Ken-ichi Ogata (Japanese); John Gremillion (English)
Born-again ex-alcoholic hotelier.
Colleena
Voiced by: Kae Araki (Japanese); Luci Christian (English)
An elf who works in flower delivery.
Grace
Voiced by: Misa Watanabe (Japanese); Sara Chamblass (English)
A human dressmaker.
Milliea (ミリア, Miria)
Voiced by: Kumiko Nishihara (Japanese); Marcie Corder (English)
An elf cursed to eternally wear a magical suit of armor she donned in order to protect her city from an evil giant. After a few comical attempts by TWHE to strip her of the armor, she finally manages to remove it, only to put it back on again.
Milliea's Grandfather
Voiced by: Isami Tanonaka (Japanese); Matthew Kelly (English)
A short, shriveled-up elf who is also a pervert who holds an antidote for Millia's armor to come off.
Judge (ジャッジ, Jajji)
Voiced by: Fumihiko Tachiki (Japanese); Mike Kleinhenz (English) for Season 1 and Jay Hickman (English) for Season 2
The chief elven prosecutor for the world in which Elf Hunters find themselves. He is often looking for ways to end the heroes' reign of terror.
Magistrate (裁判長, Saibanchou)
Voiced by: Rin Mizuhara (Japanese); Alissa Alban (English) for Season 1 and Monica Rial (English) for Season 2
A female elf presiding judge who heard the case against Elf Hunters, only to award them a license to keep stripping elves as a means to return home.
Rosa
Voiced by: Eriko Kawasaki (Japanese); Emily Womack (English)
Mermaid elf leader.
Lana
Voiced by: Yu Asakawa (Japanese); Kira Vincent-Davis (English)
Elven thief.
Nancy
Voiced by: Yuko Mizutani (Japanese); Kim Prause (English)
A healer who has become a recluse after being inflicted with spell fragments.
Dr. Bruno
Voiced by: Chiharu Suzuka (Japanese); Monica Rial (English)
A scientist and astronomer, developing her father's heliocentric theories, much to the chagrin of the astronomical council. However, her theories are very different from the normal scientific definition.
Beano
Voiced by: Masato Hirano (Japanese); Rob Bundy (English)
Mr. Tomato
Voiced by: Donaldo (English)
They are two island-based botanists whose experiments with increasing plant growth exponentially end in conflagration.
Lilia
Voiced by: Minako Ito (Japanese); Melissa Williams (English)
An elf who plays the part of a ditsy schoolgirl in a scenario invented by the Judge to entrap Elf Hunters.
Mr. Wolf
Voiced by: Yuichi Nagashima (Japanese); Ed Paez (English)
A wolf who bears a grudge against humanity after the death of his parents. His plans are thwarted by Elf Hunters, who later save him from four elven hunters.
Grandma
Voiced by: Orine Fukushima (Japanese); Melissa Gybele (English)
Grandmother of Little Red Riding Hood.
Elven Hunters
Voiced by: 1. Jessica Boone {English) 2. Kathya Coker (English) 3. Kim Prause (English) 4. Melissa Williams (English}
Four psychopathic hunters who are eventually shown as female elves.
Pulana
Voiced by: Yuri Amano (Japanese); Jessica Boone (English)
An elf bearing an enchanted Chinese-style dress. She is rescued by Junpei and Ritsuko from the Friskers.
The Friskers
The Chairman
Voiced by: Yasunori Matsumoto (Japanese); Illich Guardiola (English)
Leader of the Friskers, a group who pride themselves on being the primary stripping faction in the Elf Hunters' fantasy world. Ironically, they worship TWHE as the premiere elf strippers.
Bunny Mask
Voiced by: Kenichi Ono (Japanese); Randy Sparks (English)
Mary the Shepherd
Voiced by: Tomohisa Asabu (Japanese); George Manley (English)
Man Who Stripped the Emperor
Voiced by: Takahashi Yoshida (Japanese); Rob Bundy (English)

There are several Father Christmases in the world in which Elf Hunters find themselves, including Satan, Infomercial and Salary Man Santas, as well as several female Santas – including Annette. There is also a Dog Santa.

Satan Santa
Voiced by: Takashi Matsuo (Japanese); Jay Hickman (English)
Infomercial Santa
Voiced by: Vic Mignogna (English)
Salary Man Santas
Voiced by: 1. Chris Patton (English) 2. Andy McAvin (English)
Regina
Voiced by: Niina Kumagaya (Japanese); Kathya Coker (English)
A powerful elven sorceress residing in Treetown, who firstly attempts to lure Elf Hunters into becoming human sacrifices by a trick, in order to save her world from destruction at the hands of the Legendary Sorcerer (subsequently ending up stripped), before imploring their aid when her fears become reality.
Mayor of Treetown
Voiced by: Takashi Matsuo (Japanese); Andy McAvin (English)
Helping Regina with her plans.
Bizarre
Voiced by: Naoko Matsui (Japanese); Allison Sumrall (English)
An elven master thief with plans for global domination. She is aided by two goblins.
Goblin 1
Voiced by: Eiji Itoh (Japanese); Vic Mignogna (English)
Goblin 2
Voiced by: Tomohisa Asabu (Japanese); Chris Patton (English)
Legendary Sorcerer
Voiced by: Omi Minami (Japanese); Greg Ayres (English)
Having lain dormant for many years under Treetown, the sorcerer has the power to destroy the world.

== Media ==
=== Manga ===
The manga was written and illustrated by Yu Yagami. It was serialized by MediaWorks in the manga magazine Dengeki Comic Gao! from June 1995 to March 2003, and collected in 21 bound volumes. It is licensed in English by ADV Manga, with only the first seven volumes published in English in 2004, before the series went on indefinite hiatus. ADV's website makes no mention of the series in manga form, so it is unlikely the series will be continued.

=== Anime ===
Two anime series were created. Both were animated by Group TAC and produced by Amuse, Inc., while the second was also produced by Project E2. Both series were licensed by ADV Films, who released as 4 DVDs. In 2009 Sentai Filmworks released the series in a complete collection set.

=== =Those Who Hunt Elves ===
No.	Title	Original release date
Volume 1 – Ready, Set, Strip!
1	"Those Who Hunt Elves Attack" "Raishū! Erufu o karu mono-tachi" (来襲!エルフを狩るモノたち)	October 4, 1996
The team are taken for a group of "legendary warriors" prophesied by Emily to save a town from marauding fish-men pirates.
2	"An Invincible Team Is Formed" "Tanjō! Muteki no pātī" (誕生!無敵のパーティー)	October 10, 1996
Celcia joins the team as they take on Gabriella's band of mercenaries.
3	"The Red One or the Blue One?" "Sentaku! Aka to ao no hiyaku" (選択!赤と青の秘薬)	October 17, 1996
Dihal, the elven protector of a town under siege by terrorists, makes a bet with the team to see who can defeat "The Skeletons" first.
4	"The Search for the 1,000th Fighter" "Hissatsu! 1000-nin-me o nerae" (必殺!1000人目をねらえ)	October 24, 1996
Rapier, an elf kick boxer inflicted with a curse until she can defeat one thousand opponents consecutively, selects Junpei as her 1,000th opponent.
5	"The Addition of the Fifth Fiend" "Tsuika! Go-ban-me no nakama" (追加!五番目の仲魔)	October 31, 1996
Ritsuko's tank runs out of fuel in a town terrorized by the spirit of a deceased cat which can possess inanimate objects.
6	"The Most Horrible Spell of All Time" "Senritsu! Shijō saiaku no jumon" (戦慄!史上最悪の呪文)	November 7, 1996
High priestess Annette grows frustrated with Celcia's support of the elf-strippers, and decides to take the initiative in destroying them.
Volume 2 – Elf Stripping for Fun and Profit
7	"Catch Me in a Field of Flowers" "Kyōfu! O-hanabatake de tsukamaete" (恐怖!お花畑でつかまえて)	November 14, 1996
While camping in a haunted mansion, the team discovers a field of elven flower-people.
8	"To the End of This World and Beyond" "Rinjū? Ano yo no hate made mo" (臨終?あの世の果てまでも)	November 21, 1996
In order to strip a ghost elf, the team must leave their bodies.
9	"Let the Maiden Dance in Beauty" "Kandō! Kimi yo utsukushiku mae" (感動!君よ美しく舞え)	November 29, 1996
Airi helps a poor elf girl realize her dream of being the belle of the royal ball.
10	"The Elf Who Couldn't Undress" "Higeki! Nugitai erufu" (悲劇!脱ぎたいエルフ)	December 5, 1996
The team are sought out by Milia, who wants their help to remove her cursed armour.
11	"No Tomorrows for the Captured" "Gyakushū! Omae-tachi ni ashita wa nai" (逆襲!お前たちに明日はない)	December 12, 1996
While elements of our world begin appearing in the elf world, a plot is set in motion to capture the team.
12	"And Yet Those Who Still Hunt Elves" "Soshite erufu o karu mono-tachi" (そしてエルフを狩るモノたち)	December 19, 1996
Celcia and the team stand trial for their elf-stripping antics.

=== Those Who Hunt Elves 2 ===
No.	Title	Original release date
Volume 3 – Forgive Me for Stripping You
13	"Those Who Fish Elves" "Erufu o tsuru mono-tachi" (エルフを釣るモノたち)	October 2, 1997
The TWHE has to start all over again hunting for spell fragments. Celcia gets a call for help from mermaid elves.
14	"Those Who Wipe" "Fukitai mono-tachi" (フキたいモノたち)	October 9, 1997
The TWHE runs out of toilet paper, which leaves Junpei running around.
15	"Those Who Have Been Animal Cursed" "Norowaretakke? Mono-tachi" (呪われたっケ?モノたち)	October 16, 1997
Celcia becomes Panda due to the curse.
16	"Those Who Manipulate Heaven and Earth" "Ten to chi o ayatsuru mono-tachi" (天と地を操るモノたち)	October 23, 1997
TWHE get in argument about which moves around "The Sun or The Earth?". Dr. Bruno might have the answer.
17	"Those Who Bean" "Mame ni hamaru mono-tachi" (マメにはまるモノたち)	October 30, 1997
While TWHE are stuck on an island, they witness the growing of a large beanstalk.
18	"Those Who Are Entrapped!" "Damasareru mono-tachi" (騙されるモノたち)	November 6, 1997
The Judge returns to stop TWHE from raising havoc on the citizens.
Volume 4 – Still Stripping After All These Years
19	"Those Who Hunt Wolves" "Urufu o karu mono-tachi" (ウルフを狩るモノたち)	November 13, 1997
TWHE go to a town which is being stalked and attacked by a wolf.
20	"Those Who Protect Elves Sometimes" "Toki ni wa erufu o mamoru mono-tachi" (時にはエルフを守るモノたち)	November 20, 1997
TWHE run into a girl, who is being chased by the Friskers.
21	"Those Who Wait for Noel" "Noeru o matsu mono-tachi" (ノエルを待つモノたち)	November 27, 1997
TWHE celebrate Christmas.
22	"Those Who Fight for the Spotlight" "Shuyaku o arasou mono-tachi" (主役を争うモノたち)	December 4, 1997
The citizens of Treetown hunt for TWHE.
23	"Those Who Dream" "Yumemiru mono-tachi" (夢見るモノたち)	December 11, 1997
While resting by the river, TWHE find a treasure chest filled with pillows.
24	"Those Who Still Hunt Elves" "Yappari erufu o karu mono-tachi" (やっぱりエルフを狩るモノたち)	December 18, 1997
The Legendary Sorcerer awakes in Treetown, and TWHE end up heading back there. After defeating the Legendary Sorcerer, TWHE are back to square one on the spell. The series ends with TWHE hunting again.

==== Music ====
Those Who Hunt Elves

Opening Theme:
- "Angel Blue"
  Lyrics by: Naoko Hamasaki
  Composition and arrangement by: Chihiro Kiryu
  Song by: Naoko Hamasaki

Ending Theme:
- "The Genius Comes At The End" (天才は最後にやってくる; Tensai wa Saigo ni Yatte kuru)
  Lyrics by: Natsumi Tadano
  Composition and arrangement by: Hideki Tsutsumi
  Song by: Naoko Hamasaki

Those Who Hunt Elves 2

Opening Theme:
- "Round11"
  Lyrics by: Naoko Hamasaki
  Composition and arrangement by: Chihiro Kiryu
  Song by: Naoko Hamasaki

Ending Theme:
- "To a Place Beyond Miracles" (奇跡の向こう側へ; Kiseki no Mukōgawa e)
  Lyrics by: Naoko Hamasaki
  Composition and arrangement by: Hideki Tsutsumi
  Song by: Naoko Hamasaki
