= Hikkatsu! Strike a Blow to Vivify =

Japanese manga series

- Cover of the English edition of volume 1

ヒッカツ! (Hikkatsu!)
- Genre: Comedy, Science fiction
- Manga
- Written by: Yu Yagami
- Published by: MediaWorks
- English publisher: NA: Go! Comi
- Magazine: Dengeki Comic Gao!
- Original run: May 27, 2005 – May 27, 2006
- Volumes: 3

Hikkatsu! Strike a Blow to Vivify, known simply as Hikkatsu! (ヒッカツ!) in Japan, is a Japanese shōnen science fiction comedy manga series written and illustrated by Yu Yagami. It was published in Japan by MediaWorks in the monthly manga magazine Dengeki Comic Gao! from May 27, 2005, to May 27, 2006, and collected in three bound volumes. It was licensed in North America by Go! Comi, with all three volumes released.

== Premise ==
In a future where geomagnetic abnormalities have made everyday home appliances come alive, karate student Shota seeks to save humanity by perfecting his "Repair Blow"—it was inspired by a man who hit a television to make it work, but with Shota's strength he just demolishes it. In the company of Momoko and Kanji, he travels Japan through enclaves of interest groups, looking to help others.

== Main characters ==
Shota (ショータ, Shōta)
A teenage boy who has spent ten years studying karate alone, trying to perfect a Repair Blow that will fix broken machinery (though usually he just winds up utterly destroying said machinery.) His Repair Blow is also able to fix a dislocated shoulder.
Momoko (モモコ)
A girl raised by pigeons who falls in love with Shota at first sight when he tries to retrieve her last ¥200 lost in a ramen vending machine. She travels with a pigeon named Hatoko, who ordinarily sits on her head. She also thinks that she and Shota are married and constantly has delusional fantasies in which Shota shows romantic interests in her while in reality he does not. She claims to have learned pigeon martial arts, used to defend against predators, from her foster family.
Kanji (カンジ)
A grifter who sells defective toy robots at the start of the series. After his merchandise is destroyed by Shota practicing his Repair Blow, Kanji starts travelling with him, hoping to profit from him. He is also constantly attacked by Momoko.

== Manga ==
The series was first published in Dengeki Comic Gao! and collected in three bound volumes. It is licensed in North America by Go! Comi, with two volumes published as of January 2008.

Volume	Japan release date	Japan ISBN	North America release date	North America ISBN
1	2005-10-27	ISBN 4-8402-3225-3	2007-10-03	ISBN 978-1-933617-57-2
2	2006-01-27	ISBN 4-8402-3321-7	2008-01-16	ISBN 978-1-933617-58-9
3	2006-07-27	ISBN 4-8402-3536-8	2008-04-06	ISBN 978-1-933617-59-6

== Reception ==
The English translation of Hikkatsu! Strike a Blow to Vivify was favorably reviewed by Anime News Network, calling it "a satisfying light read". A common criticism of reviewers is that the characters are one-dimensional.
