= Balance Policy =

2010 manga series by Akihito Yoshitomi

- Volume 1 cover art, featuring Kenji

バランスポリシー (Baransu Porishī)
- Genre: Science fiction
- Manga
- Written by: Akihito Yoshitomi
- Published by: Shōnen Gahōsha
- Imprint: TS Comics
- Magazine: Change H (Note: The magazine was renamed Trans Switch in 2013.)
- Original run: April 26, 2010 – February 28, 2014
- Volumes: 2
- Manga

Tokyo Shōjo
- Written by: Akihito Yoshitomi
- Published by: Shōnen Gahōsha
- Imprint: YK Comics
- Magazine: Young Comic
- Published: June 10, 2016
- Volumes: 1

Balance Policy (Japanese: バランスポリシー, Hepburn: Baransu Porishī) is a Japanese science fiction manga series written and illustrated by Akihito Yoshitomi. It was originally planned as a six-page story, but was expanded as Yoshitomi saw potential to develop the setting further, and was serialized by Shōnen Gahōsha from 2010 to 2014 in their magazine Change H; it has since been collected in two tankōbon volumes. A one-shot finale, Tokyo Shōjo (東京少女; 'Tokyo Girl'), was published in 2016, and was collected in a volume together with Yoshitomi's series Lily System in 2019.

The story is set in the near future in Japan after birth rates have declined significantly, and follows Kenji, who has been chosen to be part of a government initiative to counteract this with a feminization procedure making men able to give birth. Critics called the story emotionally resonant but considered its premise of forcibly having one's body altered questionable.

== Plot ==
Balance Policy is set in Japan in a near future after birth rates have declined dramatically worldwide, particularly of girls. To counteract this, the government has invested large amounts of money into enacting feminization policies and procedures, making men able to give birth, and has over the course of ten years done this with 934 people. The story depicts the changing psychology of the main characters as they live through the change.

Teenager Kenji Ooki reluctantly undergoes the procedure, and returns home a year later looking like a girl, but remains conflicted about his identity. Kenji catches up with his best friend Masaomi Yoshizaki, but the two are no longer as comfortable together as in the past. Miko, a friend of both Kenji and Masaomi, admits to having had a crush on Kenji, but finds closure upon accepting his new appearance, and gives him some of her old clothes. Kenji also meets Chinee, Masaomi's lesbian sister whom he was attracted to, but he rejects her advances, leaving her dejected. Kenji reacts badly to his first menstrual period, and is taken to Tokyo for a medical examination after saying farewell to Masaomi.

Fifteen years later, Masaomi is an officer in the Balance Policy Organization, and returns to his childhood home. He meets Sakura Fujisawa, formerly Goro Fukuyama, who is one of Kenji's fellow patients; she embraced a female identity while at the hospital, and now has a son. Masaomi also meets Kenji again, who now lives as a woman, and realizes that Sakura and Kenji have set him up for the reunion. He learns that Kenji's father had sacrificed himself to save Kenji's life through a heart transplant, which eventually prompted Kenji to return to the town to understand him better. The story ends with Sakura and her son visiting an amusement park filled with children.

== Production and release ==
Balance Policy was written and illustrated by Akihito Yoshitomi, who initially intended to finish the story in six pages, but continued as he thought there was room to further developing the setting. Although the series is billed as a transgender manga, Yoshitomi portrays Kenji as still identifying as male, with the changes only applying to his body.

The manga was serialized by Shōnen Gahōsha in their magazine Change H, a manga anthology featuring stories with transgender or cross-dressing themes, starting in issue 3 on April 26, 2010. It remained on the magazine through its title change to Trans Switch in 2013, until its final issue on February 28, 2014. Shōnen Gahōsha later collected the series in two tankōbon volumes under TS Comics, their imprint for transgender-themed manga, and released them on November 19, 2012, and May 31, 2014; the first volume debuted as one of the highest selling manga of the week. Both volumes were bundled with Balance Policy art prints at some book stores.

A one-shot finale, Tokyo Shōjo, was published by Shōnen Gahōsha in Young Comic's July 2016 issue on June 10, 2016. It was collected as part of the tankōbon release of another series of Yoshitomi's, Lily System, which was released on March 11, 2019, under Shōnen Gahōsha's YK Comics imprint.

=== Volumes ===
No.	Release date	ISBN
1	November 19, 2012	978-4785939670
Chapter 1–8
2	May 31, 2014	978-4785953027
Chapter 9–14

== Reception ==
IT Media included Balance Policy in a feature on recommended manga with transgender themes. They called it charming, describing its straightforward narrative tone as gripping, and saying that the careful depiction of the characters' psychology made for an emotionally resonant story. On the other hand, Da Vinci called the premise ridiculous and questioned whether the need to raise the birth rate could conceivably be dire enough for people to be forced into a feminization procedure the cost of a jet fighter, without being able to protest. Similarly, according to pop culture news site Akiba Blog, readers considered the premise "surreal", but still found it interesting. Kono Manga ga Sugoi! included the series in a feature on the history of LGBT manga as an example of a transgender manga with a strong social focus.
