= Kage Kara Mamoru! =

Japanese light novel series

- Cover of Kage Kara Mamoru! volume 1 as published by Media Factory

陰からマモル (Mamoru the Shadow)
- Light novel
- Written by: Taro Achi
- Illustrated by: Sai Madara
- Published by: Media Factory
- Imprint: MF Bunko J
- Original run: July 2003 – March 2008
- Volumes: 12
- Manga
- Written by: Achi Taro
- Illustrated by: Sai Madara
- Published by: Media Factory
- English publisher: NA: DrMaster
- Magazine: Comic Flapper (former); Monthly Comic Alive
- Original run: 2007 – 2009
- Volumes: 5
- Anime television series
- Directed by: Yoshitaka Fujimoto
- Written by: Ryunosuke Kingetsu
- Music by: Takeshi Watanabe
- Studio: Group TAC
- Licensed by: NA: Sentai Filmworks
- Original network: TV Tokyo
- Original run: January 7, 2006 – March 25, 2006
- Episodes: 12

Kage Kara Mamoru! (陰からマモル; "Mamoru from the Shadows", or lit. "I Will Protect You from the Shadows") is a Japanese series of light novels written by Achi Taro. The light novels had ended in March 2008 with the release of Volume 12, but as of July 2009, a new series entitled Motto! Kage Kara Mamoru! (もっと!陰からマモル!; "More! Mamoru from the Shadows") has started serialization. It features manga and anime adaptations. The main character is Mamoru Kagemori, a ninja who is sworn to protect his neighbor Yūna Konnyaku.

== Story ==
The Kagemori family has secretly protected its neighbor, the Konnyaku family, for 400 years. Mamoru has been the protector of the daughter, Yūna Konnyaku, since they were in kindergarten. When Yūna is in trouble, Mamoru quickly puts on his ninja suit and transforms into a competent ninja; able to protect her from harm. Unfortunately, this poses quite a challenge as Yūna, being both clumsy and absent-minded, often stumbles into situations where Mamoru must once again come to her rescue.

On the first day of their new school term, a model airplane accidentally makes a dive towards Yuna, but it is quickly stopped by a thrown kunai. At school, Airi Sawagashi invites Yūna to go bowling, but is unhappy when Mamoru also comes.

At the bowling alley, Yūna wanders into the men's restroom and interrupts a yakuza deal involving fake dolls. As a result, they kidnap her and take her to their boss. Mamoru follows them, takes out the gang, and rescues Yūna.

The story continues as new characters enter Yūna and Mamoru's lives with both good and evil intentions, wacky adventures, hints of romance, and confrontations with the strangest of adversaries.

== Characters ==
Mamoru Kagemori (陰守 マモル, Kagemori Mamoru)
Voiced by: Atsushi Kisaichi (Japanese)
Mamoru Kagemori is a plain boy with disheveled hair and thick glasses, which are actually a disguise. He is the son of a ninja family which has been protecting the Konnyaku family for 400 years. He reveals his true self (without glasses) when he transforms into a ninja to protect Yūna from harm and is very lazy except when he's saving Yūna. He has been friends with Yūna since they were children, and has also been in the same class as her since kindergarten. He has a fear of bears, which developed when he tried to protect Yamame from a bear when they were children. His name: Mamoru, means protect in Japanese.
Yūna Konnyaku (紺若 ゆうな, Konnyaku Yūna)
Voiced by: Mai Nakahara (Japanese)
Yūna is Mamoru's childhood friend and neighbor. She is a quite clumsy and often ditzy girl. These qualities get her into many troublesome situations. Since she has known Mamoru since kindergarten, Mamoru knows everything about her, except for the object that Yūna looks at every night before bed - a photo of herself and Mamoru which she cherishes. It is hinted that she is in love with Mamoru, but is afraid to admit her love to him. She is shown to be jealous of Mamoru interacting with other girls as seen when she prevented Sawagashi and Tsubaki from holding his hands as they slept at the zoo.
Airi Sawagashi (沢菓 愛里, Sawagashi Airi)
Voiced by: Ryōko Shintani (Japanese)
Airi, a wealthy girl, is a classmate and friend of Mamoru and Yūna. She discourages any relationship between Yūna and Mamoru, because, according to her, childhood friends who become lovers are generally unsuccessful. However, this may be a ploy since she has feelings for Kagemori, whom she derisively calls 'Ahoru' ("Mamoron"). She occasionally gives Mamoru hints that she likes him, which he is oblivious to, and she vents her frustration by hitting Mamoru.
Tsubaki Mapputatsu (真双津 椿, Mapputatsu Tsubaki)
Voiced by: Sachiko Kojima (Japanese)
Tsubaki is a miko swordswoman. Her sword can cut anything but nata de coco. She was hired by the yakuza boss in order avenge his earlier defeat at Mamoru's hands. After finding out the truth about the yakuza boss and realizing she had been tricked, she exacts her revenge on him. She also decides to enter Mamoru's school to become more worldly. After Mamoru cheers her up when she was depressed about being old-fashioned, she develops feelings for him.
Yamame Hattori (服部 山芽, Hattori Yamame)
Voiced by: Ai Shimizu (Japanese)
Yamame is a ninja and a relative of Mamoru. She remembers Mamoru comforting her when she was little and is quite disappointed after seeing the glasses-wearing person he has become. When Mamoru saves her from Chin Panji, a Chinese master of Animal Style combat hired by the yakuza boss, she realizes that he hasn't really changed. The next day, Yamame transfers to his school. She is also responsible for Mamoru's fear of bears (he had protected her from a wild bear, but was attacked and injured by it).
Hotaru Kumogakure (雲隠 ホタル, Kumogakure Hotaru)
Voiced by: Erina Furukawa (Japanese)
Hotaru is a ninja. She confesses her love to Mamoru when they first meet. She and her brother are scheming to defeat Mamoru (a member of the strongest ninja clan) in order to avenge their clan's disgrace in losing to Yamame at a ninja athletic meet. Her feelings for him prevent her from finishing off the wounded Mamoru and she instead administers some of her family's secret medicine mouth-to-mouth thus allowing him to defeat her brother. Afterwards, she moves into the neighborhood and starts attending the same school.
Bluemaru (ぶる丸, Burumaru)
Kagemori family's Bull Terrier ninja dog. Despite his cute appearance and lazy nature, Bluemaru is actually a very skilled canine and is able to use various ninja weapons in his mouth.
Sakurako Kagemori (陰守 桜子, Kagemori Sakurako)
Sakurako is Mamoru's mother. She is a ninja and is in charge of protecting Yūna's mother.
Kengo Kagemori (陰守 堅護, Kagemori Kengo)
Kengo is Mamoru's father. He is a ninja and is in charge of protecting Yūna's father.
Miminosuke (耳の介, Miminosuke)
Yamame's ninja rabbit companion.

== Media ==
=== Light novels ===
==== First series ====
1. Mamoru the Shadow! ISBN 4-8401-0838-2
2. Mamoru the Shadow!（2） 椿の初でいとの道 ISBN 4-8401-1012-3
3. Mamoru the Shadow!（3） 忍の里から来た少女 ISBN 4-8401-1124-3
4. Mamoru the Shadow!（4） 来襲!甲賀最強の忍 ISBN 4-8401-1198-7
5. Mamoru the Shadow!（5） 小鐘井黄金伝説 ISBN 4-8401-1198-7
6. Mamoru the Shadow!（6） ゆーなとユーナ王女様 ISBN 4-8401-1450-1
7. Mamoru the Shadow!（7） ホタルの居候日記! ISBN 4-8401-1515-X
8. Mamoru the Shadow!（8） ウエディング時代劇娘 ISBN 4-8401-1592-3
9. Mamoru the Shadow!（9） 伊賀娘たちが来た! ISBN 978-4-8401-1776-0
10. Mamoru the Shadow!（10）プリンセスアイリーン ISBN 978-4-8401-1890-3
11. Mamoru the Shadow!（11）うらしまゆーな ISBN 978-4-8401-2087-6
12. Mamoru the Shadow!（12）最後にマモル ISBN 978-4-8401-2194-1

==== Second series ====
1. More! Mamoru the Shadow! (July, 2009)

=== Anime ===
The light novels were adapted into a 12 episodes anime series by the Group TAC studio and produced by Aniplex. This anime series was broadcast on TV Tokyo between January 7, 2006, and March 25, 2006, with last two episodes aired the same day.

The anime opening theme is "Million Love" (ミリオン・ラブ) sung by Mai Nakahara and the ending theme is "Rainy Beat" sung by Ryōko Shintani, Sachiko Kojima, Ai Shimizu, and Erina Furukawa.

==== Episodes list ====
No.	Title	Original airdate
1	"Continuing to Protect for 400 Years"; Transliteration: "Mamori Ysuzukete Yon'hyaku Nen" (Japanese: まもり続けて四百年)	7 January 2006
2	"There Is Nothing In This World I Cannot Cut"; Transliteration: "Kono Yo de Kirenu Mono wa nashi" (Japanese: この世で斬れぬ物はなし)	14 January 2006
3	"The Girl From The Ninja Village"; Transliteration: "Shinobi no Sato kara Kita Shōjo" (Japanese: 忍の里から来た少女)	21 January 2006
4	"What's an idol?" Transliteration: "Nante tatte aidoru" (Japanese: なんてたってアイドル)	28 January 2006
5	"A Maiden's Heart And A Samurai's Soul"; Transliteration: "Otomegokoro to Samuraidamashii" (Japanese: 乙女心と侍魂)	4 February 2006
6	"The Transfer Student, the Beautiful Girl's Heartbeat"; Transliteration: "Tenkōsei wa dokidoki Bishōjo" (Japanese: 転校生はドキドキ美少女)	11 February 2006
7	"Boy Ninja Mamoru"; Transliteration: "Shōnen Ninja Mamoru" (Japanese: 少年忍者マモル)	18 February 2006
8	"Sawagashi Family Anti-Crime Strategy"; Transliteration: "Sawagashi-ke Bōhan Taisaku-sen" (Japanese: 沢菓家防犯大作戦!)	4 March 2006
9	"Kōganei's UFO Report!"; Transliteration: "Kōganei Yū Efu Ō Chūihō!" (Japanese: 小鐘井UFO注意報!)	11 March 2006
10	"Yūna's Yellow Golden Legend"; Transliteration: "Yūna no Kōgan Densetsu" (Japanese: ゆうなの黄金伝説)	18 March 2006
11	"Bye bye, Yūna"; Transliteration: "Baibai, Yūna" (Japanese: バイバイ、ゆうな)	25 March 2006
12	"Mamoru the Shadow!"; Transliteration: "Kage Kara Mamoru!" (Japanese: 陰からマモル!)	25 March 2006

=== Manga ===
The five volumes of the manga adaption were released by the publisher Media Factory. The manga adaption was first serialized between November 2005 to April 2006 in the seinen magazine Monthly Comic Flapper and from August 2006 in Monthly Comic Alive.

Between July 16, 2008, and January 21, 2009, DrMaster published the English translation of the first three volumes of this series under the name of Mamoru the Shadow Protector.

In Indonesia, the manga has been licensed by Elex Media Komputindo, under the title The Bodyguard.
