= Yukiko Takaguchi =

Japanese voice actress

Yukiko Takaguchi (高口幸子, Takaguchi Yukiko; born November 3, 1974 in Okayama) is a Japanese voice actress. Her biggest role was in the anime The Wallflower where she voiced Sunako Nakahara. Other major roles include Soreto in Fantastic Children, Setsuko Ohara in Super Robot Wars Z, Vante in Queen's Blade: Rebellion, and Miyako Yamashina in We Without Wings.
