= Ray (manga) =

Japanese manga and anime series

- Promotional image for Ray the Animation
- Manga
- Written by: Akihito Yoshitomi
- Published by: Akita Shoten
- English publisher: NA: ADV Manga
- Magazine: Champion Red
- Original run: 2002 – 2006
- Volumes: 7
- Anime television series

Ray the Animation
- Directed by: Naohito Takahashi
- Produced by: Kazuhiko Suzuki; Kazuyoshi Takagi; Takefumi Fukuri; Takuya Chiba; Miyuki Udagawa
- Written by: Atsuhiro Tomioka
- Music by: Masami Okui; GodSpeed
- Studio: OLM; Tezuka Productions
- Licensed by: NA: Maiden Japan
- Original network: Family Gekijou, VK
- Original run: April 6, 2006 – June 29, 2006
- Episodes: 13
- Related
- Black Jack

Ray is a science fiction manga by Akihito Yoshitomi that ran in Champion Red magazine from 2002 to 2006 and was compiled in seven volumes. An anime television series adaptation titled Ray the Animation was broadcast in Japan from April 6, 2006, through June 29, 2006. The anime series was produced by Tezuka Productions and animated by OLM.

== Plot ==
The story takes place in the near future, and describes a young girl living in an institution that raised children in order to sell their organs on the black organ transplant market. Her original eyes were taken and she was rescued and outfitted with a pair of new X-ray eyes by the underground doctor Black Jack and then adopted by a surgeon named Dr. Kasugano.

Ten years later, Ray took up her mother's profession and become a well known and respected surgeon because of her unique abilities and sharp skill. After beginning work at a less-than-typical hospital, Ray is faced with bizarre cases that require her special skills. In the second half of the series she begins to uncover details about the organization that removed her eyes and the whereabouts of the other children with whom she was raised. The storylines take up bioethical issues such as organ donation, human cloning and even reincarnation.

Like its counterpart Black Jack 21, the show favors science-fiction elements in place of realism, with cases often resembling actual medical conditions but with fantastical elements added to heighten drama.

== Characters ==
=== Main characters ===
Ray Kasugano (春日野 零, Kasugano Rei)
Ray is the main character and an expert surgeon. She started life as a clone, raised along with other children by a mysterious organization as a source for organ donation. The children had no names, only numbers, and because the identifying numbers on her back "075 - 1 - 74" equal zero when subtracted, she called herself "Ray" as Rei is the Japanese word for zero. After her original eyes were taken, she was rescued and outfitted with a pair of new X-ray eyes by the underground doctor Black Jack and then adopted by a surgeon named Dr. Kasugano. Ray is often thought of as distant and private by her co-workers and her cool demeanor and precision with a scalpel make her a sought-out surgeon for difficult cases. She is disturbed by memories of her childhood and searches for the children with whom she was raised, especially her first love, Kouichi but she also begins to like Toshiaki Shinoyama too.
Toshiaki Shinoyama (篠山利明, Shinoyama Toshiaki)
Toshiaki Shinoyama is a manufacturer of artificial organs that he claims are "top of the line." Shinoyama is Ray's business partner and harbors romantic feelings for her. Often depicted as a playboy and a slacker, he cares deeply for the people who depend on him. Despite Ray's seeming indifference (and often annoyance) with him, Shinoyama has expressed that he is happy with their relationship even if it remains the same, and claims that he will leave if he can no longer be of service to Ray. However, in later episodes he feels conflicted by the reappearance of Koichi, and is continually goaded by Misato to make the first move.
Aka Ribbon (Red Ribbon) (アカリボン, Akaribon)
Aka Ribbon was one of the children raised with Ray and like many of the children, she named herself after her most valuable possession. She and Ray were separated until being reunited ten years later in the hospital where Ray worked. Red Ribbon suffered from amnesia after being found at the scene of an accident and at first did not recognize Ray. It was later revealed that she was sent by the organization that raised her and Ray. She was carrying a dangerous mind-controlling parasite which possessed several staff members until Ray was able to remove it. She moved in with Ray and often tagged along on patient visits. Her childlike demeanor is often used as comic relief during particularly heavy story-lines. In later episodes she is shown to be more aware of her situation and begins to show hostility towards Ray indicating she may have been fully aware of her situation from the start. It is later revealed that she was working with Koichi to keep tabs on Ray and may not have had amnesia. Red Ribbon is deeply in love with Koichi, but she dies after being shot by him when she threatens to harm Ray in a jealous rage.

=== Hospital characters ===
Director Sawa (沢院長, Sawa inchō)
Director Sawa is the director of the hospital. He has a long dark beard and wears a distinctive eyepatch which gives him an intimidating appearance but he is actually quite caring about both his patients and staff. He rescued Ray 10 years earlier when she was left for dead and lost his right eye and leg in the process. He worked with Dr. Kasugano and the H Ring man before they separated 20 years earlier.
Dr. Kasugano (春日野, Kasugano)
Dr. Kasugano is Ray's adoptive mother and a surgeon. She worked along with Sawa and the H Ring man to establish a hospital 20 years earlier. After Ray was rescued, Kasugano took her in and raised Ray as her own child, hoping that she would never have to reveal her daughter's true origins. Presented as a kind and caring mother, Kasugano taught Ray all she knows about being a surgeon and appears near the end of the series to help her adopted daughter reconcile with their shared past.
Misato (美里, Misato)
Misato is the nurse who first encountered Ray and her ability at the scene of an accident. She wears a double bun haristyle and glasses. Like all the nurses at the hospital, she appears skilled in martial arts and singlehandedly took on a group of thugs trying to stop an operation.
Rie (利江, Rie)
Rie is another nurse with pigtails who works with Misato. She often suggests absurd-sounding reasons for an illness that may or may not be the case. She is the cheeriest of the hospital nurses and a good friend of Mami and Rumi.
Rumi (留美, Rumi)
Rumi is a nurse at the hospital often seen with Rie and Mami. She has an un-reciprocated crush on Shinoyama and a generally shy and nervous personality.
Mami (真美, Mami)
Mami is the fourth nurse and the quietest of the group. It is implied that she may be a lesbian or bisexual.
Sumire (Violet) (すみれ, Sumire)
Sumire is a childhood acquaintance of Shinoyama, referring to him by the intimate name "Toshi-kun". Sumire is the daughter of the head of a major pharmaceutical company and is the test subject for many of the artificial organs her father's company manufactures. She is shown to be fanatically devoted to Shinoyama despite his rejection of her romantic advances and feels Ray is only using him for her own purposes. In order to have her organs replaced by ones made by Shinoyama she purposely damages her own body. It is revealed in episode 12 by Red Ribbon that she was the recipient of Ray's original eyes.
Kenji (賢治, Kenji)
Kenji is a young boy at the hospital who is kept in isolation behind a glass wall and appears to have some sort of immune deficiency. He is shown as having a psychic ability and is able to see Ray's memories when she puts her hand up to the glass. The end of the series suggests that there may be a way to cure his condition and it is implied by the nurses that he and Honoka (the clone) have begun to develop a mutual affection.

=== Numbers characters ===
"Numbers" are clones created by H Ring Man and are so-called because of numbers tattooed behind their right shoulders. In an effort to distinguish themselves they created names for themselves.

The H Ring Man (Hリングの男, H ringu no otoko)
The H Ring Man is the head of the organization which created Ray and the "Numbers" children. He was responsible for the loss of Ray's eyes as well as the parasite which infected Red Ribbon. His real name is Shinichi Saito (斉藤 晃一, Saitō Shin'ichi), and along with Ray's mother Dr. Kasugano and Dr. Sawa, he established the hospital where Ray and the others now work over 20 years later. Eventually he split from the other two and began his own research into creating human clones who he hoped would keep the memories of their former lives, effectively a reincarnation of the deceased. This become an obsession to recreate his dead mother who died when he was 10 years old during the happiest days of his life. Her name was Honoka, hence the trademark "H" on his signet ring. Ray and One are revealed to be clones of his dead mother, but which he considered failures. The children Ray was raised with were referred to as "Numbers" and were all considered failures, as they were unable to recover the memories of the people who provided the genetic material. Consequently, they were used as unwilling organ donors as a form of "recycling", according to Dr. Kasugano.
Koichi (コーイチ, Kōichi)
Koichi is Ray's first love who proposed escaping with Ray from the "white room" in the clone farm when they were children. He reappears 10 years later requesting to meet Ray. He makes his first physical appearance after One attempts to kill Ray but he keeps his distance. It is later revealed that he is a clone of the H Ring Man whom he despises, but whom he worked with to track down Ray. He recreated a utopian "white room" which gathered all of the surviving Numbers and planned to include Ray and restore her to her original self. This involved retrieving her original eyes which were implanted into Sumire. He grows increasingly maniacal, and he shows the same level of obsession with Ray as the man he was cloned from had with his mother. He commits suicide by shooting himself in the head, when he believes that Ray has died.
One
One created her name by using her number 078 - 3 - 74 which equals 1 when subtracted. She and Ray were cloned from the same woman, though One shows much more violent and malevolent tendencies but unconditionally loves her creator based on the memories of her genetic original. She is distinguished from Ray physically by her red lipstick and longer, more unkempt hair. One claims to have conscious memories of her former life and as a result tries to kill Ray, whom she sees as competition for the affections of the H Ring Man. She shares a strained relationship with him and later she shot by Koichi under orders from the H Ring Man who pronounced her useless.
Saeko
Saeko is a young girl who lives with her overprotective father, Tetsuzo Omoribe, in the village of Hotarudani. She is one of H Ring Man's earliest clone experiments and has a perfect resemblance to her father's dead wife of the same name. Some in their village believed her to be a product of witchcraft to bring back the dead. Often ill and out of school, she was at a hospital in Tokyo receiving supposedly life-saving treatment at the time all the other villagers disappeared. They were in fact wiped out to keep H Ring Man's cloning experiments secret. After it is discovered that she suffers the same fatal congenital heart defect that killed her mother she goes into a state of cardiac arrest and Ray performs emergency surgery on the girl despite knowing that Saeko has only a short time to live.
Honoka (ほのか)
Honoka is a young girl of around 8 years old and the most successful clone because she has memories of her mother's life. She is shown comforting the H Ring Man like his real mother would have in the town he built in order to fulfill his fantasy of reliving his childhood before his mother died. She is shot in an attempt to protect the H Ring Man from Koichi, but luckily is taken to Sawa's hospital and survives. Her cloned memories begin to fade however she connects with Kenji, who helps her reconcile her past.
Blue
Blue is a boy who chose his name after his most prized possession, a blue marble. Ray is reunited with her old friend in the first chapter of the manga, and he also makes a small appearance in the last episode of the anime among the reunited Numbers. Blue has no memories of his past, much like Red Ribbon, and Ray finds him under attack by H Ring Man's people. He is deliberately infected with a deadly fungus planted within his lungs, which if Ray does not operate and remove within twenty minutes the spores of the fungus will be released and Blue, as well as those who inhale the spores, will die. Ray is successful in her operation, though remains unsettled by Blue's reappearance, which is marked with the H Ring Man's people commenting that the H Ring Man is continually watching her. Blue is hospitalized thereafter, where he remains an amnesiac. Tightly clenched in his hand is the blue marble from his childhood; to protect Blue, Ray does not unclench his hand to prevent Blue from recalling his painful past before he is ready.

=== Other characters ===
Miyabi
Miyabi is a friend of Ray's who appears in episode 5. When they were in school together, Miyabi served as the miko of her family's shrine to the god Hitogami, a kami who wished to become human. During a ceremony in which she was fed an oyster-like organism Miyabi developed a very large and blister like growth and appeared to be possessed by a male entity, causing Ray to remove the growth on her own in her very first surgery. Ray speculated that the oyster was actually the spirit of Hitogami trying to possess the girl and gain a body as in the legend.
Black Jack (ブラック・ジャック, Buraku Jaku)
Black Jack is the surgeon who outfitted Ray with her X-ray eyes. He is originally from Osamu Tezuka's Black Jack manga and appears briefly in episode 1 and again at the end of episode 13.

== Episode list ==
No.	Title	Original release date
1	"Eyes Of God"; Transliteration: "kami no me" (Japanese: 神の目)	April 5, 2006
Misato, a nurse at local hospital, witnesses an accident and she encounters a young woman who efficiently treats the wounded with an apparent ability to see inside their bodies. The next day at Director Sawa's hospital, the same woman arrives and introduces herself to Misato as Kasugano Ray, a young surgeon ready to commence work. Ray is assigned to operate on a dying drug dealer, and initially refuses to use an unapproved and experimental anesthetic for the operation, but eventually agrees. She then uses her special visual ability to remove the man's tumor. Meanwhile, Misato along with nurses Rie, Rumi and Mami use their martial arts skills to fight off criminals who have been sent to kill their sick associate. Later, she encounters Black Jack who has been shadowing her, and admits that her ability enables her to see into people's bodies but she cannot see what is in their hearts.
2	"Partner"; Transliteration: "pātonā" (Japanese: パートナー)	April 12, 2006
Anna Takakawa, a selfish young girl in Director Sawa's hospital needs a new heart, and her sister Kanna pleads with Ray to use transplant her own heart. Ray only agrees because she intends to implant her business partner Toshiaki Shinoyama's new experimental artificial heart, but doesn't tell the sisters. However, Anna goes into decline and Ray has to start the transplant operation. Fortunately, Shinoyama arrives with a new smaller version of his artificial heart which Ray successfully implants. When Anna recovers, she reunites with Kanna and tearfully apologises to Kanna for demanding her heart.
3	"Scenery Through The Glass"; Transliteration: "garasu-goshi no fūkei" (Japanese: ガラス越しの風景)	April 19, 2006
One day, Shinoyama takes Ray and the three nurses to an aquarium near the ocean. However, his intention is for Ray to perform underwater surgery on the son of an important politician who is infected with a dangerous pathogen which cannot be exposed to air. She agrees to extirpate the lesions, but she must wear a clear suit over a bikini to protect herself from the pathogen, much to her annoyance and Shinoyama’s delight. During the operation a power failure prevents Ray from completing the operation and cutting oxygen to the patient. Misato suggests they reroute emergency power to the room and Ray manages to complete the operation. Later, Ray visits the quarantined boy Kenji who is able to read her mind, and she gives him a shell she found on the beach.
4	"Red Ribbon"; Transliteration: "akai ribon" (Japanese: 赤いリボン)	April 26, 2006
Shinoyama finds a young girl with a broken arm and amnesia after an accident, but without a surname. He takes Ray to visit her, and she recognizes the girl by the numbered tattoo on her shoulder as Akaribon. The meeting prompts Ray to recall her past where she was one of a group of children raised by a syndicate to be organ donors. They had no names, only numbers tattooed on them, so they created their own names. During Akaribon's treatment, Director Sawa becomes suspicious of her appearance in the hospital, especially after she releases a debilitating gas from a seed on her neck and attacks him. Shinoyama manages to set off the fire alarm, triggering the sprinkler system and neutralizing the gas. The seed propagates itself, causing everyone to attack Ray, but she manages to excise the buds from their necks, including Akaribon who later moves in with her.
5	"A Substitute"; Transliteration: "narikawari" (Japanese: 成り代わり)	May 3, 2006
A girl named Sayaka Oyama is admitted to the hospital with spontaneous bleeding and speaks as if possessed. In a flashback Ray tells the nurses of her friend Miyabi who ate ceremonial oysters as part of her duties as a miko. Ray says that a few days later, she cut off an enormous growth that had grown on Miyabi from the parasitic oysters in what was her first surgery. Back In the present, Oyama admits to being possessed and starts bleeding from wounds which open up in her body again. Ray calls Shinoyama, who takes Oyama to a place where an old cherry tree being cut down. Ray realizes that Oyama is having a sympathetic response to the tree's plight, and before the tree is completely cut through she removes a cherry seed from Oyama. Ray concludes that the tree was using the girl as a way to stay alive and protect its offspring.
6	"A Gift"; Transliteration: "okurimono" (Japanese: 贈りもの)	May 10, 2006
Ray receives a set of glass scalpels in the mail from an unknown source. Later at the hospital, a prematurely aged man Yoshio Asada is brought suffering from headaches and abdominal pain. His body also overreacts to metal and electronics. Akaribon recognizes him as a man from the syndicate which raised her and Ray. Ray receives a phone call from The H Ring Man who was responsible for Asada's condition saying that he sent the scalpels to enable Ray to operate on him as a test of her abilities. Ray successfully completes the delicate operation without the use of metal or electronics.
7	"Lover"; Transliteration: "omoi hito" (Japanese: 想い人)	May 17, 2006
Asada leads Shinoyama and Ray to an abandoned sanatorium and Ray recognizes it as the place where she was raised. Misato then invites Ray to a party arranged by the head of Horiuchi Life, an artificial organ manufacturer. The party is for the birthday of his daughter Sumire who turns out to be a childhood friend of Shinoyama. Ray notices that she is being kept alive by artificial organs. Sumire professes her love for Shinoyama, but he rejects her. She drinks alcohol and damages her artificial organs in order to have them replaced by Shinoyama's. Her wish granted when Ray herself performs the operation. Later, as Ray and Shinoyama discuss their relationship, Ray's childhood sweetheart Koichi, calls her and says they should escape together, in a reference to their past.
8	"The Wriggling Past"; Transliteration: "ugomeku kako" (Japanese: 蠢く過去)	May 24, 2006
A young woman named Kaori Sakai is brought in to the hospital suffering mysterious symptoms and she feels that something is inside her. A mycelium finally manifests itself outside Kaori as branching filaments covering her body. Director Sawa proposes that it is a combination of a fungus and a parasitic worm's egg. Ray realizes it is a creation of the syndicate like the one which killed her friend Hana when they were children. Ray operates to eliminate the heart of the colony and saves Kaori. The medical team suspects that she contracted the parasite in a village called Hotarudani during a ski trip with friends. Apparently all of the village residents mysteriously disappeared six months earlier. At the end of the episode, and older Koichi is shown reminiscing about Ray and hoping to see her soon.
9	"The Clone"; Transliteration: "arawashi" (Japanese: 現し身)	May 31, 2006
Shinoyama drives Ray and Akaribon to the village of Hotarudani where the population had disappeared overnight. At a store on the way, they learn that Tetsuzo Omoribe still lives there with his adopted sickly daughter Saeko who looks just like his deceased wife. While there, a boy called Takumi demands that they take him with them to visit his classmate Saeko. Takumi reveals that he saw figures in hazmat suits arrive just days before the villagers disappeared. They meet Saeko and her overly protective father near the village, but Saeko goes into cardiac arrest. Ray saves Saeko and Tetsuzo tells them that after his wife Saeko died fifteen years earlier, an unknown man then promised to bring her back. A year later he returned with a baby whom he called Saeko and who grew up to be the image of his wife. When the Saeko developed the same heart condition, the man took them to his hospital, but when they returned all the villagers had disappeared. As Shinoyama and Ray drive back home, they realize that the syndicate was already creating clones fifteen years ago. Suddenly, their van is attacked by a woman on a motorcycle who looks like Ray.
10	"Reunion"; Transliteration: "saikai" (Japanese: 再会)	June 7, 2006
Ray returns to the hospital and tells Director Sawa that she knows the syndicate have been cloning humans and demands more information, but he refuses. Ray meets her mother who explains that she worked with the H Ring Man who originally shared the same dream to heal people, but he left to develop clones as a way to resurrect the one woman he desperately wanted to bring back to life. However, because the clones were born without the original's memories he saw them as failures, so they were given numbers and used as organ donors. Suddenly the woman looking like Ray interrupts the discussion and explains her name is One and that she is the perfect clone because she has the memories of the original. One tries to kill Ray, but she is stopped by Koichi who leaves before they can be reunited.
11	"Painfully Loving..."; Transliteration: "kanashi teru..." (Japanese: 哀してる…)	June 14, 2006
Ray's mother refuses to name the woman the H-ring man has tried to clone. After locating the H-ring man’s headquarters, Ray easily infiltrates the building because of her identical appearance to One. She confronts him about his actions in exploiting the clones he created, however he is not apologetic and even says that One is a failure - she does not have all the memories of the original and he calls her a "spare". Sawa bursts in, but One helps the H-ring man escape. However, Koichi arrives and kills One, then leaves with the H-ring man.
12	"The Paradise Of Agony"; Transliteration: "nageki no rakuen" (Japanese: 嘆きの楽園)	June 21, 2006
Akaribon telephones Ray and says that she and Shinoyama should meet her and Koichi at Mt. Mutsuki. They arrive to find an underground facility which contains a recreation of the H-ring Man's childhood village. Suddenly, memories come flooding back to Ray which are not hers. Meanwhile, at the Sawa Hospital, they discover Sumire has been abducted by a group of people including Akaribon. Back at the village, Ray meets Koichi who shows her H-ring Man happily living with a young girl named Honoka. She is a clone of his deceased mother who died when he was 10 years old and she retains the memories from her previous "life". Koichi reveals himself to be a clone of the H-Ring Man, though he insists he is nothing like the man who created him. In revenge for how H-Ring Man treated his childhood friends, Koichi calmly kills both the H-ring man and shoots the young Honoka clone when she tries to protect him. Koichi declares his own love for the confused Ray while Akaribon declares her love for him. Akaribon reveals that she has been working with Koichi all along, including abducting Sumire to retrieve Ray's eyes. Explosives set by Koichi cause a cave-in which injures Shinoyama and Ray, damaging her right eye. When the hospital staff arrive, they only find Shinoyama and the dying Honoka.
13	"Life"; Transliteration: "inochi" (Japanese: 命)	June 28, 2006
Ray awakes to find that Koichi has recreated the white room where he, Ray, Blue and the others grew up. Meanwhile, Shinoyama tracks Sumire to a remote island and Sawa mounts a rescue mission. Koichi plans to take Ray's eyes back from Sumire, but Ray refuses and accuses him of having the same obsession with the past as H-ring Man. Akaribon accuses him of the same behavior and she attacks Ray in a jealous rage, but Koichi shoots her. Ray then collapses from her injuries, and believing her to be dead, Koichi commits suicide. The survivors are rescued by Sawa who finds work for the "Numbers" in his hospital and he saves Honoka whose recovery is also helped by a growing friendship with Kenji. Shinoyama takes care of Ray and she finally acknowledges her love for him. Later, Black Jack arrives and restores both of Ray's eyes, and she is handed her first case - to work on a cure for Kenji's illness.

== Cultural references ==
- Because of copyright reasons, Black Jack was only alluded to as BJ and never seen fully in the original manga, but because the anime was produced by Osamu Tezuka's own studio he is able to appear fully in the anime (though still somewhat obscured) and be referred to by his original name. In Black Jack 21, the sequel to the Black Jack anime, Black Jack was referred to as "BJ" by the assassins hell bent on killing him.
- At the end of episode 12 and throughout episode 13 the bandage over Ray's damaged eye may be a visual reference to another famous anime character with the same name; being Rei Ayanami of Neon Genesis Evangelion, who appears several times with a bandage over her right eye. The two characters also share the same red-colored eyes and distant personalities, as well as some elements of their unique origins.

== Notes ==
As indicated in episode 4, "Red Ribbon"
