= Akihito Yoshitomi =

Japanese manga artist

- Known for: Manga art

Akihito Yoshitomi (吉富昭仁, Yoshitomi Akihito) is a Japanese manga artist from Miyazaki Prefecture, born on 5 September 1970. His most known works are the series Eat-Man, which consisted of 19 volumes, and Ray, which consisted of 7 volumes. Eat-Man and Blue Drop have been adapted into anime series. Yoshitomi has also worked on many one-shot manga with yuri content.

== Works ==
- Loan Knight (ローンナイト, Rōn Naito) (1991, 3 volumes)
- Loan Knight 2 (ローンナイト2, Rōn Naito 2) (1993, 5 volumes)
- Eat-Man (1996–2002, 19 volumes)
- Ray (2002–2005, 7 volumes)
- Avenger (2003, manga adaptation)
- Blue Drop (ブルー ドロップ, Burū Doroppu) (2004–2008)
- Black Jack—Yoshitomi Akihito edition (2005)
- Ray+ (2006, 1 volume)
- Gate Runner (2006, 2 volumes)
- Tropical Girls (熱帯少女, Nettai Shōjo) (2009, 6 volumes)
- After School of the Earth (地球の放課後, Chikyū no Hōkago) (2009, 6 volumes)
- Balance Policy (バランスポリシー, Baransu Porishī) (2010–2014, 2 volumes)
- School Mermaid (スクール人魚, Sukūru Ningyo) (2013–2017, 5 volumes)
- Cyborg 009 Vs. Devilman: Breakdown (サイボーグ009VSデビルマン -BREAKDOWN, Saibōgu 009 VS Debiruman -BREAKDOWN) (2015–2016)
- Eat-Man: The Main Dish (May 2014 – August 2019, 4 volumes)
- Suginami Kuritsu Mahō Jogakuen Heiwaiji-bu (杉並区立魔法女学園 平和維持部) (July 2018 – February 2019, 1 volume)
- Kyō Kara Mirai (今日から未来) (October 2019 – present)
- Hanako of the 24th Ward (24区の花子さん, 24-ku no Hanako-san) (March 2020 – present)

== YouTube content format ==
Yoshitomi regularly uploads videos to his YouTube channel, and adheres to posting his drawing process (both real-time and time-lapsed), and much more recently, creation of his manga 24-ku no Hanako-san currently serialized in Champion Red.
