= Taro Achi =

Japanese novelist (born 1980)

- Born: October 3, 1980 (age 46); Achi, Nagano
- Writing career
- Genre: Light novel
- Notable works: Dokkoida?! Kage Kara Mamoru!

Taro Achi (阿智 太郎, Achi Tarō; born October 3, 1980) is a Japanese light novelist and screenwriter from Nagano Prefecture. He won the Silver Prize in the 4th Dengeki Novel Prize for Boku no Chi o Suwanaide. Two of his series (Dokkoida?! and Kage Kara Mamoru!) have been made into anime series. He is also a member of Red Entertainment as a scenarist.

== Works ==
=== Boku no Chi o Suwanaide series ===
- Boku no Chi o Suwanaide
- Boku no Chi o Suwanaide 2: Piment Sensou
- Boku no Chi o Suwanaide 3: Dokkindokki Dai Sakusen
- Boku no Chi o Suwanaide 4: Shito Shito Pitchan
- Boku no Chi o Suwanaide 5: Accident wa Maximum

=== Dokkoida?! series ===
- Sumeba Miyako no Cosmos-sō
- Sumeba Miyako no Cosmos-sō 2: Yūenchi de Dokkoi
- Sumeba Miyako no Cosmos-sō 3: Haikaburihime ga Dokkoi
- Sumeba Miyako no Cosmos-sō 4: Saigo no Dokkoi
- Sumeba Miyako no Cosmos-sō SP: Natsuyasumi de Dokkoi
- Sumeba Miyako no Cosmos-sō SSP: Ohisashiburi ni Dokkoi

=== Boku ni Otsukisama o Misenaide series ===
- Boku ni Otsukisama o Misenaide 1: Tsukimi Udon no Bakkyarō
- Boku ni Otsukisama o Misenaide 2: Senaka no Imomushi Dai Kōshin
- Boku ni Otsukisama o Misenaide 3: Ah Seishun no Satsuei Nikki
- Boku ni Otsukisama o Misenaide 4: Hokkyoku Iro no Tenkōsei
- Boku ni Otsukisama o Misenaide 5: Omohide Boro Boro
- Boku ni Otsukisama o Misenaide 6: Ahiru Sagashite Sanzen Ri
- Boku ni Otsukisama o Misenaide 7: 29 Banme no Katchoman
- Boku ni Otsukisama o Misenaide 8: Kaede to Ōkami no Ichinichi
- Boku ni Otsukisama o Misenaide 9: Tōko to Ōkami no Yoru
- Boku ni Otsukisama o Misenaide 10: Ōkami wa Tsukiyo ni Warau

=== Itsumo Dokodemo Nin² Ninja series ===
- Itsumo Dokodemo Nin² Ninja 1: Deatta Ano Ko wa Kunoichi Shōjo
- Itsumo Dokodemo Nin² Ninja 2: Ansatsu Date wa Suteki ni Dokkyun
- Itsumo Dokodemo Nin² Ninja 3: Nihon no Natsu, Chizakura no Natsu
- Itsumo Dokodemo Nin² Ninja 4: Gokuaku o Futatabi!
- Itsumo Dokodemo Nin² Ninja 5: Pink na Kinoko no Dai Jiken
- Itsumo Dokodemo Nin² Ninja 6: Kasuga Makoto Massatsu Shirei!

=== Kage Kara Mamoru! series ===
- Kage Kara Mamoru!
- Kage Kara Mamoru! 2: Tsubaki no Hatsu Deito e no Michi
- Kage Kara Mamoru! 3: Shinobi no Sato kara Kita Shōjo
- Kage Kara Mamoru! 4: Raishū! Kōga Saikyō no Shinobi
- Kage Kara Mamoru! 5: Kokanei Ōgon Densetsu
- Kage Kara Mamoru! 6: Yūna to Yūna Ōjo Sama
- Kage Kara Mamoru! 7: Hotaru no Isōrō Nikki
- Kage Kara Mamoru! 8: Wedding Jidaigeki Musume
- Kage Kara Mamoru! 9: Iga Musume Tachi ga Kita!
- Kage Kara Mamoru! 10: Princess Airīn
- Kage Kara Mamoru! 11: Urashima Yūna
- Kage Kara Mamoru! 12: Saigo ni Mamoru!
- Motto! Kage Kara Mamoru!
- Motto! Kage Kara Mamoru! 2: Love Story wa Totsuzen ni

=== Nazuna Hime-sama SOS series ===
- Nazuna Hime-sama SOS (なずな姫様SOS), illustrated by You Shiina (2 volumes, September 2001 - April 2002, Dengeki Bunko)

=== Video games ===
Release	Title	Role(s)
2019	Our World is Ended	Writer
