= The Wallflower (manga) =

Manga series and its adaptations

- Cover of volume 1, featuring Kyohei

ヤマトナデシコ七変化 (Yamato Nadeshiko Shichi Henge)
- Genre: Comedy; Horror; Romance
- Manga
- Written by: Tomoko Hayakawa
- Published by: Kodansha
- English publisher: NA: Kodansha Comics; SG: Chuang Yi
- Magazine: Bessatsu Friend
- Original run: March 13, 2000 – January 13, 2015
- Volumes: 36
- Anime television series
- Directed by: Shinichi Watanabe
- Written by: Haruka
- Music by: Hiromi Mizutani; Yasuharu Takanashi
- Studio: Nippon Animation
- Licensed by: AUS: Madman Entertainment; NA: Funimation Entertainment
- Original network: TV Tokyo
- Original run: October 3, 2006 – March 27, 2007
- Episodes: 25
- Television drama
- Produced by: Yasuharu Ishii; Shinichi Sanju
- Written by: Eriko Shinozaki
- Music by: Kosuke Yamashita
- Studio: TBS
- Original network: JNN (TBS)
- Original run: January 15, 2010 – March 19, 2010
- Episodes: 10

The Wallflower (Japanese: ヤマトナデシコ七変化, Hepburn: Yamato nadeshiko Shichi Henge; "The Seven Metamorphoses of Yamato Nadeshiko") is a manga series written and illustrated by Tomoko Hayakawa. The individual chapters have been serialized in Kodansha magazine Bessatsu Friend since 2000, with 36 tankōbon volumes. Under the name My Fair Lady, the manga was licensed for an English-language release in North America by Del Rey Manga and Singapore by Chuang Yi. The Wallflower ended in January 2015 after 36 volumes.

Nippon Animation adapted part of the manga into a 25-episode anime series, which aired on TV Tokyo and other channels from October 3, 2006, to March 27, 2007. It has been licensed for Region 1 release by A.D. Vision, who paid $500,000. In 2008, The WallFlower became one of over 30 ADV series whose North American rights were transferred to Funimation Entertainment.

A television drama adaptation aired on TBS and its affiliates from January to March 2010.

== Plot ==
The series tells a girl named Sunako Nakahara who was called ugly by the first and only person, to whom she confessed her love. This incident causes her life to change, thus Sunako avoids all forms of beauty, both in herself and life. Concerned by her change for the worse, Sunako's aunt – the owner of a huge mansion where free four handsome high school boys live – demands the boys to transform her niece into the "perfect lady", and in return they will be able to continue living there for free. If the boys cannot uphold their deal in the deadline, they either to either pay a lump sum of cash or vacate the premises.

Although the four of them eventually make Sunako physically beautiful enough to become a lady, she has no intention of changing problems with attitude and interests. Up until the most recent release in the story, they eventually convince Sunako's aunt that her niece is indeed a lady befitting the mansion in which they live and prevent the rent from increasing to triple the required amount.

== Characters ==
=== Main characters ===
Sunako Nakahara (中原 スナコ, Nakahara Sunako)
Voiced by: Yukiko Takaguchi (Japanese); Hannah Alcorn (English)
The main female protagonist of the series, Sunako is obsessed with darkness and a morbid fascination with blood as well as horror films.
Kyohei Takano (高野 恭平, Takano Kyohei)
Voiced by: Showtaro Morikubo (Japanese); Jessie James Grelle (English)
Kyohei is male protagonist of the series. He is cocky, but has a soft spot for Sunako and empathizes with her more so than the others. Kyohei has troubles keeping down a part-time job because his fans will chase after him, or his boss (male or female) will sexual harass him.
Takenaga Oda (織田 武長, Oda Takenaga)
Voiced by: Tomokazu Sugita (Japanese); Vic Mignogna (English)
The most intellectual of the four, Takenaga is called the "Boss" by his friends and is the least fazed by Sunako's morbid habits. When the quartet dresses Sunako up, He is usually responsible for doing Sunako's hair.
Yukinojo Toyama (遠山 雪之丞, Tōyama Yukinojo)
Voiced by: Yamauchi Yuuya (Japanese); Greg Ayres (English)
The most androgynous of the four, Yukinojo is gentle and is initially the most frightened of Sunako. Before coming to live at the mansion, he had a normal school life with a middle-class family. His mother and the Landladies are old friends and the Landlady has a soft spot for Yuki.
Ranmaru Morii (森井 蘭丸, Morii Ranmaru)
Voiced by: Hirofumi Nojima (Japanese); Chris Patton (English)
A ladies' man, Ranmaru is often going out with various beautiful older women. Like Takenaga, he comes from a wealthy family who own a series of hotel chains but was sent to live with the Landlady because he exploited his wealth and his parents wanted him to become normal. Ranmaru is shown to be better at kendo than Takenaga and usually responsible for doing her make-up whenever she has to dress up. However, his attempts are rarely successful in the long run and he is convinced that it is Kyohei's attitude towards Sunako that is the primary problem. Wanting to change his womanizing habits, his parents wanted him with a reserved and conservative girl of their preference, Tamao Kikunoi. Although Ranmaru rejects Kikunoi's love for him, he begins to develop feelings for her. He is named after the real-life Mori Ranmaru, the partner of Oda Nobunaga.

=== Supporting characters ===
Aunt Nakahara
Voiced by: Yuka Komatsu (Japanese); Tiffany Grant (English) Live-Action: Reiko Takashima
Nakahara is Sunako's aunt who expects Kyohei, Takenaga, Yuki, and Ranmaru to make Sunako into a lady. Called the "infamous Marie Antoinette of the East", she is affluent with unconventional ways of traveling, such as in a fleet of helicopters.
Noi Kasahara (笠原 乃依, Kasahara Noi)
Voiced by: Mai Nakahara
Noi is a popular girl who becomes Sunako's closest female friend at school. She loves being called beautiful by others, especially Sunako. Noi admires Sunako's tough attitude and is often over-protective of her when someone insults her.
Tamao Kikunoi (菊之井 玉绪, Kikunoi Tamao)
Kikunoi is Ranmaru's wealthy fiancée who studies at an all-girls school. They become a couple due to an arranged marriage by both of their parents.

=== Other characters ===
Goth Loli Sisters (ゴスロリ シスターズ, Gosu Rori Shisutāzu)
Yvonne: Voiced by: Niina Kumagaya (Japanese); Kira Vincent-Davis (Epi. 1-9), Allison Sumrall (Epi. 10-25) (English)
Laseine: Voiced by: Hiromi Konno (Japanese); Brittney Karbowski (English)
Madeleine: Voiced by: Kimiko Koyama (Japanese); Tiffany Terrell (English)
Roxane: Voiced by: Erika (Japanese); Monica Passley (English)
Lassine (ラセーヌ, Rasēnu), Madeline (マドレーヌ, Madorēnu), Roxanne (ロクサーヌ, Rokusānu), and Yvonne (イヴォンヌ, Ivonnu) are four girls who are completely obsessed with the main boys of the series. Initially their roles in the storyline were much smaller, but were expanded within the anime to provide comic relief. They usually have a cameo appearance in each episode saying their catch phrase "Goth-Goth, Loli-Loli" while crossing their own fingers. A notable aspect to their characters is that instead of actively pursuing their crushes, they sit in the background and wait for them to notice them. Their appearance is an exaggeration of the Gothic Lolita phenomenon, and they are very unattractive. Their names are Ierie, Machapi, Maririn, and Mintan in the Singaporean English-language translation.

== Media ==
=== Manga ===
The Wallflower manga is written by Tomoko Hayakawa. In Japan, the individual chapters have been serialized in Kodansha's Bessatsu Friend since its first issue in 2000, with 36 tankōbon volumes. It received an English-language release in North America and Singapore, respectively by Del Rey Manga and Chuang Yi, under the name My Fair Lady.

=== Anime ===
| No. | Title | Original release date |
|---|---|---|
| 1 | "The Light that Shines through the Darkness"; Transliteration: "Kurayami ni Sashikomu Hikari" (Japanese: 暗闇に射し込む光) | October 3, 2006 |
Four high school boys – Kyohei Takano, Takenaga Oda, Yukinojo Toyama, and Ranmaru Morii – have made a deal with their landlady, Mine Nakahara. If the boys succeeded in transforming her niece into a proper lady, they can live in their home rent free. However, it will triple the price if they fail. The niece, Sunako Nakahara, is poorly-dressed without fashion sense and good skin. Sunako is also a fan of horror series who has spent two years as a hikikomori after being told she was ugly when she confessed to her middle school crush.
| 2 | "Pull Down the Iron Curtain!"; Transliteration: "Tetsu no Curtain o Kōryakuse yo!" (Japanese: 鉄のカーテンを攻略せよ!) | October 10, 2006 |
The boys try to cut Sunako's bangs, with no success. After Sunako accidentally walks in on Kyohei bathing, he jumps out of the window in surprise and catches a cold as a result. They do not know this until Sunako has to defend herself against some ganguro girls who try to cut off her bangs by force, due to their jealousy of her familiarity with Kyohei. Eventually, Kyohei saves Sunako, but he ends up with a fever. Sunako has to take care of him which she does not approve of, debating whether or not to kill him. As she attempts to do so, other three boys walk in, and a black hole forms, pulling them in. The episode ends with Sunako screaming possession over Kyohei.
| 3 | "Ah, the Nostalgic Gloominess of Youth"; Transliteration: "Ah, Natsukashi-no Kurai Seishun" (Japanese: ああ, 懐かしの暗い青春) | October 17, 2006 |
Four men of the Japanese host club scene try to forcefully recruit Kyohei. Sunako doesn't think she can survive living around a bishōnen like Kyohei, as she plans to kill him. However, she has to save Kyohei from the recruiters who have kidnapped him for dubious purposes. Mine returns to invite everyone to a coming out party for Sunako, which the boys have to make Sunako a lady as soon as possible.
| 4 | "Sunako, You're Needed"; Transliteration: "Sunako, Oyobi desu" (Japanese: スナコ, およびです) | October 24, 2006 |
Sunako's class recruits her to make a haunted house for the school festival, only for Kyohei to realize that she was conned by the class president. Kyohei recruits the guys to help make her haunted house win the contest of the school festival so he can get the prize. They finally won the contest, but Kyohei is left to claim the prize, since the other three refused to accept it. Moreover, Kyohei is forced to pay for the damages caused by the explosion inflicted earlier.
| 5 | "Feast of the Beautiful Creatures"; Transliteration: "Utsukushiki Monotachi no Utage" (Japanese: 美しきものたちの宴) | October 31, 2006 |
A picture of an angry Sunako from the festival catches the eye of an egotistic photographer who wants her to model for him. Although tricked into going to the shoot, a camera shy Sunako proves a difficult subject. The four bishōnen are soon dragged into replacing Sunako in the modelling shoot, however they take leave with Sunako after the photographer explains the difficulty shooting Sunako. The five of them later go an exhibition of where a picture was discreetly taken of them, as it turns out that the photographer used that picture as the greatest attraction in the exhibition.
| 6 | "Dreamy Halloween"; Transliteration: "Yumemiru Harou~in" (Japanese: 夢見るハロウィン) | November 7, 2006 |
When Sunako becomes ill, the four bishōnen is left with a household of chores. They unsuccessfully attempt to clean, by which they figure out, with the help of Noi, that Sunako misses Halloween, her favorite holiday. They later throw a Halloween party to cheer her up.
| 7 | "I Am Number One"; Transliteration: "Ai Am Nambā Wan" (Japanese: アイ アム ナンバーワン) | November 14, 2006 |
A leader of a gang falls in love with Sunako. Thinking that Kyohei is his rival, the leader of the gang challenges him to a fight declaring who deserves Sunako as their lover. When Kyohei becomes injured, Sunako steps in and defeats the leader of the gang, putting everyone in shock.
| 8 | "Winter Wonderland" | November 21, 2006 |
The boys wonder if they are taking advantage of Sunako's cooking, and get a job at a fancy restaurant in order to lessen her burden. Kyohei wishes to eat nabe at a kotatsu, as he has never experienced the winter tradition. Kyohei goes shopping with Sunako, only to have the entire marketplace misunderstand their relationship. To add thing up Kyohei's fangirls appears and play around their grocery. Kyohei later lends a shopkeeper a helping hand, in return for some vegetables. Meanwhile, Sunako goes out to construct a kotatsu. In the end, they end up having an enormous kotatsu feast.
| 9 | "Splashing Blood and Steam Inside a Shower of Love (Part 1)"; Transliteration: "Onsen wa Yukemuri Chishibuki Koishigure (Zenpen)" (Japanese: 温泉は湯けむり血しぶき恋しぐれ(前編)) | November 28, 2006 |
The boys take Sunako, along with Noi, on a trip to the hot springs. Sunako tries to do everything she can do so that Takenaga and Noi can be alone, which leads to the fact that Kyohei and Sunako have a very intense ping-pong match. As the match ends, it is shown that Kyohei and Sunako share a kiss by accident.
| 10 | "Splashing Blood and Steam Inside a Shower of Love (Part 2)"; Transliteration: "Onsen wa Yukemuri Chishibuki Koishigure (Kōhen)" (Japanese: 温泉は湯けむり血しぶき恋しぐれ(後編)) | December 5, 2006 |
The hot springs manager has been attacked, and Sunako decides that she cannot pass up the opportunity to snoop around a real crime scene. However, the true culprit resents not only Sunako snooping around, but also her being accompanied by the four bishōnen. It turns out that the wife of the manager is responsible and plans to kill Sunako by burning her alive in the storage room, by which Kyohei is able to rescue her out of. When they confront the wife of the manager, who insults Sunako's appearance, Kyohei states they have kissed.
| 11 | "The Test and the Study Kiss"; Transliteration: "Tadaima Tesuto Benkyōchū" (Japanese: ただいま テスト 勉強チュー) | December 12, 2006 |
Sunako needs to be tutored in math, since failure to do so will cause the rent to increase. Kyohei dresses up as a nerd and studies hard to teach Sunako not to run away from her issues, however this causes an uproar among the female students. While doing so Sunako remembers the incident that she kissed a radiant being (Kyouhei) which causes her to react badly. Later Kyouhei makes her understand that a passion-less kiss is nothing. Unfortunately, Sunako still failed the exam due to putting the right answers in the wrong math problems.
| 12 | "Oh, My Sweet Home!" | December 19, 2006 |
The four bishōnen think back to their first Christmas together, when they just moved in and how different they were back then. At the time, Takenaga, Yuki, and Ranmaru first met each other at the mansion a few years ago. Mine reveals that the three of them came from rejected families. After causing a mess in the dining room, the three get into an argumentative fight. Mine later finds Kyohei and invites him in the mansion along with the others. They later receive phone calls and letters from female students searching for Kyohei. The three chip in to help drive out the females students, but to no avail. However, as Kyohei steps in, as well as with Mine's help, they resolve the issue with all the female students.
| 13 | "Oui, Monsieur!"; Transliteration: "Ui, Musshū!" (Japanese: ウィ, ムッシュウ!) | December 26, 2006 |
Yuki receives a basket of mushrooms for free. Sunako eats one of these strange mushrooms and is magically transformed into a lady. Though things start to take a turn for the worse when Sunako is one. Then all the guys try to change her back by means of seduction.
| 14 | "The Beauty of the Sleeping Woods"; Transliteration: "Nemureru Mori no Ojōsama" (Japanese: 眠れる森のお嬢様) | January 9, 2007 |
Ranmaru receives a phone call from his father, who tells him that he is engaged to be married. Determined to break the engagement, the four boys plot to make Ranmaru someone unworthy to be a husband. Ranmaru's fiancée, Tamao Kikunoi, begins to be interested in Ranmaru's imitative personalities. However, she begins to realize that Ranmaru has no interest in her. Feeling guilty, Ranmaru visits Tamao's school grounds to apologize, but he is raided by other girls Ranmaru has dated. It is later revealed that Tamao truly wants to marry him.
| 15 | "Pirates of Tres Bien"; Transliteration: "Pairētsu obu Tore Bian" (Japanese: パイレーツ オブ トレビアン) | January 16, 2007 |
Sunako and the others are invited to an island that has a history of pirates burying treasure there. Kyohei sets off to find treasure, while Sunako looks for skeletons. Then when Sunako finally finds what she is looking for, it starts to cause trouble for the guys. It is revealed that she is possessed by a spirit who activates traps sets throughout the island. Noi eventually arrives at the island, worried about Takenaga. However, the spirit causes Yuki, Ranmaru, Takenaga, and Noi to hallucinate, being possessed in the process, while Kyohei encounters the possessed Sunako. Sunako is about to release the spirit due to her love of the skeletons, returning everyone back to normal.
| 16 | "Dream Comes True"; Transliteration: "Dorīmu Kamuzu To~urū" (Japanese: ドリーム カムズ トゥルー) | January 23, 2007 |
The high school holds a sports festival, and strangely Sunako and Kyohei are willingly participating. They become strongly competitive, going to extreme measures to beat one another. In the last round, after being so competitive, they end up participating for their own personal goals.
| 17 | "Girls Bravo!!"; Transliteration: "Gāruzu Burabō!!" (Japanese: ガールズ ブラボー!!) | January 30, 2007 |
Tamao wants to feel loved by Ranmaru, even after knowing how many girls he has dated in the past. Noi suggests that she should spend the day at a beauty salon, bringing Tamao and an unwilling Sunako along. Meanwhile, Ranmaru and Takenaga have been bickering about the girls for the past few days. After spending time with Noi and Tamao, Sunako prepares a feast for them, showing that she cares about them. Later on, Ranmaru and Takenaga apologize to Noi and Tamao for their rude behavior.
| 18 | "Dream-loving Each Other"; Transliteration: "Yume Sōshi Sōai" (Japanese: 夢·相思 相愛) | February 6, 2007 |
The four boys to extreme measures to persuade Sunako into wearing a dress, by renovating the mansion in a scary appearance. However, when she goes to shop while wearing the dress, she is mistaken for taking a young boy hostage. With Noi's help, the boys rescue Sunako, causing a commotion in the process.
| 19 | "Battlechicks Valentine"; Transliteration: "Batoruchikku Barentain" (Japanese: バトルチック バレンタイン) | February 13, 2007 |
On Valentine's Day, the four boys are bombarded with cards, gifts, and boxes of chocolates from a crowd of female students. The boys do all they can to escape the madness from the lovestruck girls. Meanwhile, Sunako seems to have an obsession with chocolate, going out of her way to acquire as much as she can.
| 20 | "Trial of Love"; Transliteration: "Ai no Shiren" (Japanese: 愛の試練) | February 20, 2007 |
Kyohei becomes upset when he finds out that Sunako's anatomical mannequin, Hiroshi, is more important to her than he is. Sunako found Hiroshi in a dumpster during a downpour after she was insulted by her middle school crush two years ago. When Kyohei enters the convenience store, some female students steal Hiroshi. A concerned Sunako sets out to look for the latter, but to no avail. She later finds Hiroshi stolen by the group of female students, as they demand to obtain Kyohei. Sunako refuses but Kyouhei goes to help Sunako. Later, Kyohei is seen carrying Hiroshi with him, telling the others that the girls were satisfied just by serving him some tea and sweets.
| 21 | "Memory in Sepia"; Transliteration: "Sepia-iro no Omoide" (Japanese: セピア色の思い出) | February 27, 2007 |
Sunako's father comes to visit Sunako after he hears a rumor that Kyohei was her lover. Sunako's father spends time with Kyohei, realizing that he is a good guy at heart. He then reminisces about when he defeated a bear for Sunako, after Kyohei saw his exposed scars on his back. It is revealed that Sunako's father fears scary objects, those found in Sunako's room.
| 22 | "The Prince in Sheep's Clothing"; Transliteration: "Hitsuji no Kawa wo Kabutta Ōji-sama" (Japanese: 羊の皮をかぶった王子様) | March 6, 2007 |
Kyohei is kidnapped by a bunch of crazy shopkeepers, but Sunako is accidentally kidnapped with him. Takenaga searches for suspicious areas while Ranmaru brings Noi and Tamao to help find Sunako. Yuki is mistaken for one of the shopkeepers and is eventually taken to their hideout. Meanwhile, Sunako causes an uproar in the hideout, frightening the shopkeepers want Kyohei to return to the shopping district to save their businesses.
| 23 | "Eye of the Typhoon, Returning Home"; Transliteration: "Taifū no Me, Kitaku suru" (Japanese: 台風の目, 帰宅する) | March 13, 2007 |
Kyohei returns to his home secretly to get Sunako back. They are forced to stay one night in the same room, to which Sunako refuses to sleep near him. Sunako talks with Kyohei's parents, getting a better understanding about their situation with Kyohei. Kyohei is later confronted by his mother, frustrated by the many girls that contact him. Sympathizing with Kyohei's mother, Sunako rids the house of any mirrors. However, Kyohei's mother tries to stop her from disposing of her cosmetics. Meanwhile, the others manage to drive off all the girls that were stalking Kyohei. As they leave, Kyohei wonders why Sunako does not want to be around him.
| 24 | "Eye of the Typhoon, Straying"; Transliteration: "Taifū no Me, Meisō suru" (Japanese: 台風の目, 迷走する) | March 20, 2007 |
Kyohei is seen eating in various restaurants, as he chose to run away since Sunako does not want to be around him. However, it is revealed that Sunako seems more depressed than usual. The three boys, along with Sunako and Noi, try to convince Kyohei to come home via television broadcast. However, Mine becomes furious when she misunderstands Kyohei's position with Sunako.
| 25 | "Road to Lady"; Transliteration: "Redi e no Michi" (Japanese: レディへの道) | March 27, 2007 |
Mine comes and wreaks havoc, but Sunako luckily calms her down and teaches her how to be a good housewife. Moreover, Sunako gets invited to her aunt's party and has to face the road to womanhood. At the end, Mine tells the boys to make Sunako a super lady.

=== Live action drama ===
In the 18th issue of Bessatsu Friend, it was announced that a live action drama adaption of the manga has been green-lit for airing in January 2009. On November 30, the cast was announced for the live action drama.

== Influence ==
The Wallflower has inspired a fashion line by Julie Haus that appeared in the 2008 New York Fashion Week.
