= Dengeki Comic Gao! =

Japanese manga magazine

- Cover of the October 2007 issue of Monthly Dengeki Comic Gao! featuring Nia from Tengen Toppa Gurren Lagann
- Categories: Shōnen manga
- Frequency: Monthly
- Publisher: MediaWorks
- First issue: December 27, 1992
- Final issue: February 27, 2008
- Country: Japan
- Based in: Tokyo
- Language: Japanese
- Website: Dengeki Comic Gao!

Cover featuring Inukami! of the June 2006 issue of Dengeki Comic Gao! with the classic Gao! (ガオ!) logo

Monthly Dengeki Comic Gao! (月刊電撃コミックガオ!, Gekkan Dengeki Komikku Gao!), also known as Dengeki Gao! was a Japanese shōnen manga magazine that primarily contained manga and information about series featuring bishōjo characters. It was published from December 1992 to February 2008 by MediaWorks. The Gao in the magazine's title is a childish form of the sound Grr. Many manga serialized in Dengeki Comic Gao! were adapted from light novels published under MediaWorks' Dengeki Bunko label. The magazine was sold every month on the twenty-seventh.

When Dengeki Comic Gao! was first published, many of the manga that ran in the magazine had transferred from Kadokawa Shoten's Comic Comp magazine, though many of the titles were slightly altered. This caused the readers of Comic Comp to become interested in Dengeki Comic Gao! and in October 1994, Comic Comp ceased publication. Gradually, it became apparent that MediaWorks' similar manga magazine Dengeki Daioh was much more popular, and in response, Dengeki Comic Gao! was reformatted starting with the February 2007 issue on December 27, 2006. This was also when the Gao as printed on the magazine cover was changed from being spelled in katakana (ガオ) to being spelled in English stylized as gao. On December 9, 2006, the first issue of a special edition version of Dengeki Comic Gao! called Comic Sylph was published, and is sold quarterly; starting with volume six, Comic Sylph became a special edition version of Dengeki Daioh on March 21, 2008.

The last issue, nicknamed Gao! The Final!! (ガオ！THEファイナル!!, Gao! THE Fainaru!!), was sold on February 27, 2008, with most of the currently serialized titles reaching their final chapters, while some others continued publication in MediaWorks's similarly themed magazine Dengeki Daioh.

== List of serialized titles ==
- +Anima
- A Real Dragon
- Allison
- Baccano! 1931 The Grand Punk Railroad
- Best Student Council
- Blue Drop
- Bludgeoning Angel Dokuro-Chan
- Burst Angel
- Cosplay Koromo-chan
- Dark Edge
- DearS
- Dokkoida?!
- Eat-Man
- Ef: A Fairy Tale of the Two.
- Fortune Quest
- Getsumento Heiki Mina
- Ginga Sengoku Gun'yūden Rai
- Hanbun no Tsuki ga Noboru Sora
- Haunted Junction
- Hikkatsu! Strike a Blow to Vivify
- Honoka Lv. Up
- Hurrah! Sailor
- Inukami!
- Kaze no Hana
- Kemeko Deluxe!
- Knights
- Leviathan
- Nanatsuiro Drops Pure!!
- Oku-sama wa Mahō Shōjo: Bewitched Agnes
- Omishi Magical Theater: Risky Safety
- Pita-Ten
- Popo Can
- Prism Palette
- Release
- Shadows of Spawn
- Sorcerer Hunters
- Speed Grapher
- Stray Little Devil
- Tengen Toppa Gurren Lagann
- Those Who Hunt Elves
- Tokimeki Memorial Only Love
- Toradora!
- Ultimate Girls
- Venus Versus Virus
- Wagaya no Oinari-sama.
- Watashitachi no Tamura-kun
- We Are -Cruel Angels-
