= Suara =

Japanese singer (born 1979)

Suara すあら
- Born: Akiko Tatsumi (巽明子); August 3, 1979 (age 47); Toyonaka, Osaka, Japan
- Occupation: Singer
- Instrument: Vocals
- Labels: Lantis, King
- Spouse: Junpei Fujita (m. 2009)

Akiko Tatsumi (巽 明子, Tatsumi Akiko; born August 3, 1979), known professionally as Suara (すあら), is a female Japanese singer working under the FIX Records label, distributed by King Records. Her two singles "Musōka" and "Hikari no Kisetsu" were both used as opening themes for the anime Utawarerumono and Asatte no Hōkō respectively. Additionally, her song "Kimi ga Tame" was featured in episode twenty-six of Utawarerumono. Her song "Tomoshibi" was used as the ending theme of the anime To Heart 2. Her name is derived from the Indonesian word for "voice". She married composer and arranger Junpei Fujita in 2009.

== Discography ==
=== Singles ===
- Musou Uta (夢想歌) April 26, 2006
- Hikari no Kisetsu (光の季節) October 25, 2006
- Ichibanboshi (一番星) February 28, 2007
- BLUE / Tsubomi -blue dreams- (BLUE / 蕾 -blue dreams-) October 24, 2007
- Wasurenaide (忘れないで) January 23, 2008
- Mai Ochiru Yuki no You ni January 28, 2009
- Free and Dream April 22, 2009
- adamant faith June 24, 2009
- Akai Ito (赤い糸) October 28, 2009
- Fly away -Oozora he- (Fly away -大空へ-) January 15, 2014
- Fuantei na Kamisama (不安定な神様) November 4, 2015
- Amakakeru Hoshi (天かける星) January 27, 2016

==== Digital singles ====
- Sakura (桜) January 20, 2011
- Kimi ga Ita Natsu no Hi (君がいた夏の日) June 30, 2011
- Tsuki Akari ni Terasarete (月明かりに照らされて) September 22, 2011
- I'm a beast March 20, 2013
- Nue Dori (ヌエドリ) September 30, 2015
- Merry Christmas December 16, 2015
- Honoo no Tori (焔の鳥) July 30, 2016
- Hikari (星灯) September 21, 2016

==== Other singles ====
- Hello (Suara with Haruna Ikeda) November 25, 2005
- Niji Iro no Mirai (Suara with Rena Uehara and Akari Tsuda) March 7, 2012
- Future World (Suara)|Future World (Suara with Akari Tsuda) May 23, 2012
- Card of the Future (Suara with Psychic Lover) February 19, 2014
- V-ROAD (As a member of BUSHI 7) April 23, 2014

=== Albums ===
- Yumeji (夢路) September 27, 2006 Re-released on April 22, 2015 with a bonus track
- Taiyou to Tsuki (太陽と月) August 27, 2008
- Kizuna (キズナ) August 19, 2009
- Karin (花凛) October 26, 2011
- Koe (声) October 14, 2015

==== Best albums ====
- The Best ~Tie-Up Collection~ (The Best ～タイアップコレクション～) September 26, 2012
- Utawarerumono Itsuwari no Kamen & Futari no Hakuoro Kashu (「うたわれるもの 偽りの仮面&二人の白皇」歌集) November 9, 2016

==== Other albums ====
- Amane Uta (アマネウタ) (Mini-album) January 25, 2006 Re-released on July 21, 2010 with a bonus track
- Suara LIVE 2010 ~Utahajime~ (Suara LIVE 2010 ～歌始め～) (Live Album) June 23, 2010

== DVD/Blu-ray ==
- Sekishun Souka (惜春奏歌), released 2007-11-28
