= List of magazines published by ASCII Media Works =

This is a list of magazines published by the Japanese publishing company ASCII Media Works. After the merger of ASCII and MediaWorks on April 1, 2008, the two companies' active magazines continued publication. Most of their magazines center on anime, manga, bishōjo games, or video games. A large number of ASCII Media Works' magazines carry the title Dengeki (電撃; meaning electric shock) which precedes the title of a given magazine; the Dengeki label is also used on publishing imprints, and contests held by the company, making it a well-known trademark for ASCII Media Works. Other magazines focus on computers and information technology.

== Magazines ==
=== Active ===
Title	Magazine type	Frequency	First published
ASCII Cloud	PC, IT	Monthly	April 24, 2013
Character Parfait	Video game	Bimonthly	December 15, 2006
Comic@loid	Vocaloid manga	Bimonthly	December 26, 2012
Dengeki Arcade Game	Trading card game	Quarterly	November 29, 2006
Dengeki Bunko Magazine	Light novel	Bimonthly	December 10, 2007
Dengeki Daioh	Manga	Monthly	April 18, 1994
Dengeki G's Magazine	Bishōjo game, manga	Monthly	December 26, 1992
Dengeki Girl's Style	Otome game, manga, anime	Monthly	December 4, 2003
Dengeki Hime	Bishōjo game, eroge	Monthly	1997
Dengeki Hobby Magazine	Plastic model	Monthly	November 25, 1998
Dengeki Maoh	Light novel, manga, video game	Monthly	December 27, 1992
Dengeki Nintendo	Video game	Monthly	December 26, 1992
Dengeki PlayStation	Video game	Monthly	December 1994
Hoshi Navi	Astronomy	Monthly	December 2000
MacPeople	PC, IT	Monthly	
Mobile ASCII	Mobile phone	Quarterly	June 29, 2010
Ubuntu Magazine Japan	Ubuntu, IT	Variable	September 29, 2009
Weekly ASCII	PC, IT	Weekly	April 24, 2006

==== Special editions ====
Title	Parent magazine	Magazine type	Frequency	First published
Character Parfait Comic & Puzzle	Character Parfait	Manga	Bimonthly	April 27, 2010
Character Parfait Puchi	Character Parfait	Toy	Quarterly	November 10, 2011
Dengeki Daioh "g"	Dengeki Daioh	Manga	Monthly	September 27, 2013
Dengeki G's Comic	Dengeki G's Magazine	Manga	Monthly	August 9, 2012
Dengeki G's Festival!	Dengeki G's Magazine	Bishōjo game, eroge	Variable	December 16, 2004
Dengeki G's Festival! Comic	Dengeki G's Magazine	Manga	Bimonthly	November 26, 2007
Dengeki Game Appli	Mobile ASCII	Video game	Bimonthly	December 14, 2011
Dengeki Moeoh	Dengeki Daioh	Manga	Bimonthly	March 26, 2002
God Eater Magazine	Dengeki PlayStation	Video game	Variable	November 7, 2013
Rekidama	Dengeki Bunko Magazine	History	Bimonthly	December 6, 2010
Viva Tales of Magazine	Dengeki Maoh	Video game	Monthly	February 25, 2011

=== Discontinued ===
Title	Magazine type	Frequency	Magazine run
ASCII PC	PC, IT	Monthly	June 2006–June 24, 2013
ASCII.technologies	PC, IT	Monthly	May 23, 2009–July 23, 2011
Business ASCII	IT business	Monthly	June 18, 1977–January 23, 2010
Dengeki Comic Japan	Manga	Monthly	December 24, 2010–December 25, 2012
Dengeki Layers	Cosplay	Bimonthly	August 25, 2003–July 29, 2010
Figure Maniacs Otome Gumi	Figurine	Bimonthly	1999–December 12, 2011
Macpower	PC, IT	Monthly	January 19, 1990–September 3, 2010
Network Magazine	PC, IT	Monthly	April 1998–April 29, 2009
Papier*	Girl's fashion	Bimonthly	October 28, 2009 – March 29, 2012
Sylph	Shōjo manga	Monthly	December 9, 2006 – July 22, 2017
Unix Magazine	PC, IT	Quarterly	November 1986–June 18, 2009

==== Special editions ====
Title	Parent magazine	Magazine type	Frequency	Magazine run
CLaCLa	Dengeki Hime	Yaoi manga & light novel	Quarterly	October 30, 2007 – April 30, 2008
Dengeki 5pb.	ASCII PC	Video game	One issue	December 24, 2010
Dengeki Black Maoh	Dengeki Maoh	Light novel, manga, video game	Quarterly	September 19, 2007 – June 19, 2010
Dengeki Daioh Genesis	Sylph	Manga	Bimonthly	January 19, 2010 – November 19, 2012
Dengeki Festival! Heaven	Dengeki G's Magazine	Shōjo manga	One issue	July 9, 2008
Dengeki FPS	Dengeki Girl's Style	Video game	One issue	September 2, 2010
Dengeki G's Festival! Anime	Dengeki G's Magazine	Anime, bishōjo game	Variable	February 9, 2008 – September 29, 2009
Dengeki G's Festival! Deluxe	Dengeki G's Magazine	Bishōjo game, eroge	Variable	November 30, 2007 – July 16, 2010
Dengeki Games	Dengeki Nintendo	Video game	Monthly	October 13, 2006 – May 26, 2011
Dengeki Layers Bible	Dengeki Layers	Cosplay	Variable	March 3, 2009 – February 5, 2010
Dengeki PlayStation 3	Dengeki PlayStation	Video game	Variable	May 15, 2009 – December 3, 2009
Dengeki PSP	Dengeki PlayStation	Video game	Variable	December 3, 2004 – October 21, 2011
Dengeki Scale Modeler	Dengeki Hobby Magazine	Scale model	Bimonthly	July 25, 2007 – May 24, 2008
i-mode de Asobu!	Dengeki Maoh	Mobile phone	Bimonthly	March 28, 2001 – March 16, 2012
Visualboy Brush	ASCII PC	Pop culture males	Quarterly	November 10, 2008 – September 28, 2010

== See also ==
- Enterbrain
