= List of magazines published by MediaWorks =

This is a list of magazines that had been published by the Japanese publishing company MediaWorks, which has since become ASCII Media Works. Most of their magazines centered on anime, manga, bishōjo games, or video games. The vast majority of MediaWorks' magazines carried the title Dengeki (電撃, meaning electric shock) which preceded the title of a given magazine; the Dengeki label was also used on publishing labels, and contests held by the company, making it a well-known trademark for MediaWorks.

== Magazines ==
=== Active (1992–2008) ===
| Title | Magazine type | Frequency | First published |
|---|---|---|---|
| Dengeki Arcade Card Game | Trading card game | Quarterly | November 29, 2006 |
| Dengeki Bunko Magazine | Light novel | Bimonthly | December 10, 2007 |
| Dengeki Daioh | Manga | Monthly | April 18, 1994 |
| Dengeki G's Magazine | Bishōjo game, manga | Monthly | December 26, 1992 |
| Dengeki Hime | Bishōjo game, eroge | Monthly | 1997 |
| Dengeki Hobby Magazine | Plastic model | Monthly | November 25, 1998 |
| Dengeki Layers | Cosplay | Bimonthly | August 25, 2003 |
| Dengeki Maoh | Light novel, manga, video game | Monthly | December 27, 1992 |
| Dengeki Nintendo DS | Video game | Monthly | December 26, 1992 |
| Dengeki PlayStation | Video game | Monthly | December 1994 |

==== Special edition versions ====
| Title | Parent magazine | Magazine type | Frequency | First published |
|---|---|---|---|---|
| Character Parfait | Dengeki Nintendo DS | Video game | Quarterly | December 15, 2006 |
| CLaCLa | Dengeki Hime | Yaoi manga & light novel | Quarterly | October 30, 2007 |
| Comic Sylph | Dengeki Comic Gao! | Shōjo manga | Quarterly | December 9, 2006 |
| Dengeki Black Maoh | Dengeki Maoh | Light novel, manga, video game | Quarterly | September 19, 2007 |
| Dengeki DS & Wii Style | Dengeki Maoh | Video game | Quarterly | October 13, 2006 |
| Dengeki G's Festival! | Dengeki G's Magazine | Bishōjo game, eroge | Variable | December 16, 2004 |
| Dengeki G's Festival! Anime | Dengeki G's Magazine | Anime, bishōjo game | Variable | February 9, 2008 |
| Dengeki G's Festival! Comic | Dengeki G's Magazine | Manga | Variable | November 26, 2007 |
| Dengeki G's Festival! Deluxe | Dengeki G's Magazine | Bishōjo game, eroge | Variable | November 30, 2007 |
| Dengeki Girl's Style | Dengeki PlayStation | Otome game | Bimonthly | December 4, 2003 |
| Dengeki Moeoh | Dengeki Daioh | Manga | Bimonthly | March 26, 2002 |
| Dengeki PSP | Dengeki PlayStation | Video game | Variable | December 3, 2004 |
| Dengeki Scale Modeler | Dengeki Hobby Magazine | Scale model | Bimonthly | July 25, 2007 |
| i-mode de Asobu! | Dengeki Maoh | Mobile phone | Bimonthly | March 28, 2001 |

=== Discontinued ===
| Title | Type | Magazine run |
|---|---|---|
| Active Japan | Disabled sports | March 1995–September 1998 |
| Dengeki 3DO | Video game | |
| Dengeki Adventures | Tabletop role-playing games | January 1994–June 1998 |
| Dengeki AniMaga | Anime | April 1999 – 2005 |
| Dengeki Comic Gao! | Manga | December 27, 1992 – February 27, 2008 |
| Dengeki Dreamcast | Video game | January 1993 – 2000 |
| Dengeki hp | Light novel | December 18, 1998 – October 10, 2007 |
| Dengeki Oh | Video game | January 8, 1993 – December 1, 2006 |
| Dengeki Shōnen | Video game | September 1994–September 1996 |

==== Special edition versions ====
| Title | Parent magazine | Type | Magazine run |
|---|---|---|---|
| Dengeki G's Paradise | Dengeki G's Magazine | Bishōjo game | 1997 (one issue) |
| Dengeki Online D | Dengeki PlayStation | Online game | August 31, 2007 – December 21, 2007 |
| Dengeki PS2 | Dengeki PlayStation | Video game | January 22, 1997 – February 15, 2008 |
| Dengeki Teioh | Dengeki Daioh | Manga | April 26, 2004 – November 26, 2006 |
