= Lists of magazines =

This is a list of magazine lists.

== By audience ==
- List of men's magazines
- List of women's magazines
- List of teen magazines

== By language ==
- List of Esperanto magazines
- List of Gujarati-language magazines
- List of magazines in Hindi
- List of Kannada-language magazines
- List of Malayalam-language periodicals
- List of Persian-language magazines
- List of Tamil-language magazines

== By publisher ==
- List of magazines published by ASCII Media Works
- List of magazines published by MediaWorks

== By topic ==
- List of amateur radio magazines
- List of magazines of anomalous phenomena
- List of architecture magazines
- List of art magazines
- List of car magazines
- List of magazines writing about comics
- List of computer magazines
- List of fashion magazines
- List of film journals and magazines
- List of food and drink magazines
- List of magazines writing about gadgets
- List of video game magazines
- List of health and fitness magazines
- List of horticultural magazines
- List of literary magazines
- List of manga magazines
- List of music magazines
- List of pet magazines
- List of political magazines
- List of pornographic magazines
- List of magazines writing about science fiction
- List of teen magazines
- List of trade magazines
- List of travel magazines
- List of wildlife magazines

== Other ==
- List of magazines by circulation
- List of Japanese manga magazines by circulation
- List of house organs

== See also ==
- List of magazines released by Marvel Comics in the 1970s
