= Gakuen Utopia Manabi Straight! =

Japanese multimedia project

- Gakuen Utopia Manabi Straight! manga volume 1 cover

がくえんゆーとぴあ まなびストレート! (Gakuen Yūtopia Manabi Sutorēto!)
- Genre: Comedy; Drama; Slice of life
- Created by: Ufotable
- Manga
- Written by: Ufotable
- Illustrated by: Tartan Check
- Published by: MediaWorks
- Magazine: Dengeki Daioh
- Original run: December 2005 – February 2008
- Volumes: 4
- Anime television series
- Directed by: Team Manabibeya
- Produced by: Takahiro Yamanaka; Tsuneo Taketomo
- Written by: Ryunosuke Kingetsu
- Music by: Yasuhiro Misawa
- Studio: Ufotable
- Licensed by: NA: Discotek Media
- Original network: TV Tokyo, TV Aichi, TV Hokkaido, TV Osaka
- Original run: January 8, 2007 – March 26, 2007
- Episodes: 12 + OVA
- Video game

Gakuen Utopia Manabi Straight! Kira Kira Happy Festa!
- Developer: Marvelous Interactive
- Publisher: MediaWorks
- Genre: Visual novel
- Platform: PlayStation 2
- Released: March 29, 2007
- Manga

Manabi Straight! Sakra
- Written by: Ufotable
- Illustrated by: Eshika/Shōgo
- Published by: Enterbrain
- Magazine: Famitsu Comic Clear
- Original run: January 30, 2015 – February 26, 2016
- Volumes: 2

Gakuen Utopia Manabi Straight!, (Note: Japanese: がくえんゆーとぴあ まなびストレート!, Hepburn: Gakuen Yūtopia Manabi Sutorēto!; lit. "School Utopia: Manabi Straight") often shortened to Manabi Straight!, is a Japanese multimedia project co-developed by the animation studio Ufotable and MediaWorks. The project revolves around a group of high school girls in the year 2035 when the birth rate has dropped dramatically. It launched in August 2004 in MediaWorks' Dengeki AniMaga magazine, and went on to produce a manga adaptation serialized in MediaWorks' Dengeki Daioh, and a second manga serialized in Enterbrain's Famitsu Comic Clear. A 12-episode anime series aired on TV Tokyo between January and March 2007, and is complemented by an original video animation (OVA) episode released exclusively on DVD in October 2007. Discotek Media licensed the series and OVA for release in North America in 2019. A PlayStation 2 visual novel based on the series was released in Japan in March 2007, developed by Marvelous Interactive.

== Plot ==
Manabi Straight! is set in 2035 when the birth rate has dropped dramatically. As a result, some schools are being closed down because of a lack of students available to teach. Morale in schools has dropped dramatically, and the all-girl Seioh Private High School (私立聖桜学園, Shiritsu Seiō Gakuen) is no exception. The story begins when the main character, Manami Amamiya, transfers to Seioh High School. Manami is an active girl with a positive personality, often shouting her personal motto Massugu Go! (まっすぐ Go!; meaning "Go straight ahead!") as a motivator for herself to go forward in life. On Manami's first day of school, the lone student council member and secretary Mika Inamori tries to rally students to join the council, but is initially met with an apathetic audience. However, Manami expresses interest in becoming the student council president. To show the school how much she wants to lead the student body, Manami begins to sing Seioh's school song after hearing it for the first time the day before. At the conclusion of the song, Manami is inducted as the student council president and received well by the entire school. The story that follows Manami working with Mika, and three other classmates—Mutsuki Uehara, Mei Etoh, and Momoha Odori—in student council matters, despite Manami and Mika initially being the only official members. After some remodeling of the student council room, Manami and her friends set forth to plan for the upcoming student festival.

== Characters ==
Manabi Straight! main characters: Mei (top-left), Momoha (top-right), Mutsuki (bottom-left), Manami (bottom-center), and Mika (bottom-right).

Manami Amamiya (天宮 学美, Amamiya Manami)
Voiced by: Yui Horie
Manami, also known as "Manabi" (まなび), born on August 30, 2018, has a very active personality and gives everything a lot of effort. It is mainly due to her uplifting personality that other students begin to have more vigor in their lives, in contrast to how bland life was before she transferred. After transferring to Seioh Private High School, she becomes the student council president, and sets forth to transform the lives of the students at the school so as give everyone a better experience while attending Seioh. One of her first decisions is to clean up and remodel the student council room into a café of sorts where any student can come and relax. This spurs a cooperation from many of the other clubs in the school, which helps brings the students together under one project.
Despite her enthusiasm to become the student council president early on Manami soon shows an incapability to lead even a joint student council meeting. Manami relies on her close friends for support for the things she wants to put forth for the sake of the school, while simultaneously giving her friends the motivation they need to continue work within the student council. She lives with her older brother Takefumi who is also her legal guardian.

Mika Inamori (稲森 光香, Inamori Mika)
Voiced by: Ai Nonaka
Mika, also known as "Mikan" (みかん), is a shy and clumsy girl who is constantly falling down and bumping into things. As an only child, she has taken advantage of her position and has been spoiled by her parents. After meeting Manami, Mika becomes very attached to her. At first she was the only member in the student council, taking the position of secretary, but was later joined by Manami when she became the student council president.
At first she is unsure about Manami's strange enthusiasm and is unsure how to work with her within the council. As time passes, Mika begins to become more enthused herself by going along with Manami's plans to reform student life at Seioh. Mika seems to be the least mature of the five main characters, even going as far as to believe "little people" finished the work for the school festival promotional video while she, Minami and Mutsuki were sleeping.

Mutsuki Uehara (上原 むつき, Uehara Mutsuki)
Voiced by: Marina Inoue
Mutsuki, also known as "Mucchii" (むっちー), is an exceptional athlete whose reputation often precedes her. In effect, sports clubs at school have invited her to participate in several club activities as an honorary member. Not wanting to turn them down, Mutsuki ends up participating in a multitude of other sports-club related activities in addition to the work she puts forth for the student council, despite initially not being an official member. This is due to her liking to help out where she is needed. She has a tomboyish personality, often hitting Mei on the back very hard and sporting a short haircut for a girl. Mutsuki's mannerisms are not feminine either and her voice is deeper than the typical female voice for her age.
Mutsuki has known Mei Etoh as far back as elementary school and often tries to get her to participate with the other main characters as a group rather than distance herself more from them. Mutsuki was the first person Mika became friends with upon entering high school. The two share an odd friendship as they have little in common. Mutsuki is eventually inducted into the student council as the assistant.

Mei Etoh (衛藤 芽生, Etō Mei)
Voiced by: Aya Hirano
Mei, also known as "Mee-chan" (めぇちゃん), usually appears to be a stubborn girl who tends to be industrious and competitive despite her standoffish nature. Mei secretly desires to be friendlier, but finds it difficult to express her emotions. This is due to an event in her past during elementary school when she was unanimously voted to be the class representative. Before long, the students in her class started shirking their own duties, in effect giving Mei all the work to do herself. After this treatment from her peers, Mei had lost faith in the intentions of people and distanced herself from others. When greeted by other students, Mei will usually not respond and just keep walking, apparently completely ignoring them, but is in fact too shy to engage in conversation. Mei has very little tolerance for school politics and sees school events for the waste of time that they are. Mei and Mutsuki have known each other since childhood, though Mei does not act like it.
After initially trying to organize the work of the student council, Mei gets inadvertently involved with the council's initial projects after Manami becomes the president, such as remodeling the student council room or helping to organize the inter-school dodgeball tournament. Mei is eventually inducted into the student council as the treasurer.

Momoha Odori (小鳥 桃葉, Odori Momoha)
Voiced by: Saki Fujita
Momoha, also known as "Momo" (もも), is a quiet girl from a rich family who may seem lazy since she tends to sleep during class time. She does not talk much, which usually leaves her to not get directly involved with student council affairs. She is a member of the journalism club and broadcast committee, which serve as the reporters of school news either through printed articles or recorded interviews. She is always looking for interesting things to report on and carries around a digital video recorder. Her hobby is videotaping the events of the student council surrounding Manami and her friends.
Shimojima (下嶋)
Voiced by: Takayasu Usui
Shimojima is the male teacher of Manami's class; Manami started to call him Shimojii (しもじー) and eventually the other main characters followed suit. He once came to work after drinking a little too much. Despite this, he has shown an interest in helping Manami in her endeavor in making school life more interesting for the students. Once he donated 5,000 yen to the student council and tried to help with the early planning of the student festival.
Takako Kakuzawa (角沢 多佳子, Kakuzawa Takako)
Voiced by: Nami Kurokawa
Takako is the student council president of Seioh's sister school Aikoh High School (愛光学園, Aikō Gakuen). Her school is much more organized and has more money for school matters, such as for the student festival. She has a nice and helping attitude and has leadership abilities which likens her to that of the typical student council president.
Takefumi Amamiya (天宮 武文, Amamiya Takefumi)
Voiced by: Shinnosuke Tachibana
Takefumi is Manami's older brother and is her only guardian, as their parents' whereabouts are unknown. While living together, he is in charge of most of the domestic chores around the house as Manami has to attend school. He loves and cares for his little sister very much and was very concerned once when her usual energetic attitude was completely depressed. He is dating the superintendent of Aikoh, Kyōko Kibukawa, a woman eight years his senior.

== Media ==
=== Print ===
Manabi Straight! originally began as a reader-participation game whose development is directly influenced by the readers. The project launched in volume 12 of MediaWorks' Dengeki AniMaga magazine sold on August 30, 2004, with original character design and illustrations by Atsushi Ogasawara. The project continued until Dengeki AniMaga volume 19 when the magazine ceased publication on August 29, 2005.

The Manabi Straight! manga, with story by Ufotable and illustrated by Tartan Check, was serialized in MediaWorks' manga magazine Dengeki Daioh between the December 2005 and February 2008 issues. Four tankōbon volumes were released between May 27, 2006, and February 27, 2008. A second manga, titled Manabi Straight! Sakra (まなびストレート! SAKRA), with story by Ufotable and illustrated by Eshika/Shōgo, was serialized in Enterbrain's online magazine Famitsu Comic Clear from January 30, 2015 to February 26, 2016. Two tankōbon volumes were released on August 12, 2015, and March 14, 2016.

=== Anime ===
A 12-episode anime television series produced by Ufotable aired in Japan between January 8 and March 26, 2007, on the TV Tokyo television network. An original video animation (OVA) episode was released on October 10, 2007. The production staff of Manabi Straight! removed the traditional "director" position and instead a team of studio producers and episode directors called Team Manabibeya (チームまなび部屋, Chīmu Manabibeya) shared the burden together. Team Manabibeya includes the story director Ryunosuke Kingetsu, the animation director and character designer Atsushi Ogasawara, the layout director Takurowo Takahashi, and the technical director Takayuki Hirao. The opening theme is "A Happy Life" and the ending theme is "Lucky & Happy"; both are sung by Megumi Hayashibara. The single containing both songs was released on February 7, 2007. "A Happy Life" is a cover of Ritsuko Okazaki's 1996 single, while "Lucky & Happy" is a cover of a song written by Okazaki for the anime Wedding Peach. Discotek Media licensed the series and OVA for an April 30, 2019, Blu-ray release in North America.

Five character mini albums were released between September 6, 2006, and January 1, 2007, featuring the characters of Manami Amamiya, Mika Inamori, Mutsuki Uehara, Mei Etoh, and Momoha Odori, sung by their respective voice actresses from the anime. Two original soundtracks were released for the anime on February 21 and May 16, 2007. The soundtracks featured background music tracks, remixes of the songs featured on the character mini albums, and original songs. A single titled "Seioh Gakuen Kōka Band", sung by Yui Horie and Minori Chihara, was released on March 21, 2007; the single contained the two insert songs found in episode 11 of the anime.

No.	Title	Original release date
1	"Extraterrestrial Manami Appears"; Transliteration: "Manami Seijin, Arawaru" (Japanese: 学美星人、あらわる)	January 8, 2007
Manami Amamiya transfers to the all-girl Seioh Private High School and arrives with a bang. Before long, Manami is elected the student council president due to her vigorous personality.
2	"Straight Ahead Go"; Transliteration: "Massugude Gō" (Japanese: まっすぐでゴー)	January 15, 2007
Manami and Mika start to clean up the student council room but after initially finding it a daunting task, Mutsuki, Momoha, and even Mei helps out to turn the room into a café where the students in the school can hang out.
3	"Monday is Too Late"; Transliteration: "Getsuyōbi Ja Ososugiru" (Japanese: 月曜日じゃ遅すぎる)	January 22, 2007
As an effort to get the other schools to work together, Manami plans a dodgeball tournament. Afterwards, when the student councils from the five participating schools meet, they start to discuss what to do for their respective upcoming school festivals. Manami initially gets discouraged that she isn't able to help very much during the discussion.
4	"The Film Reel of Promo Go"; Transliteration: "Puromo de Gō no Kan" (Japanese: プロモでゴーの巻)	January 29, 2007
The student council plans to release a promo video led by Mei to promote the upcoming school festival. However, Mei soon drops out of the project due to trauma from her past related to being a class representative in elementary school, which left her emotionally scarred.
5	"The Night of the Two"; Transliteration: "Futarikkiri no, Yoru" (Japanese: ふたりっきりの、夜)	February 5, 2007
Manami has come down with the mumps and thus cannot attend school for one week. In the meantime, Mika tries to become closer friends with Mei while they try to decide before Manami's return what the theme for the school festival shall be.
6	"Cinnamon Sugar Raised Happiness"; Transliteration: "Shinamon Shugā Reizudo Hapinesu" (Japanese: シナモンシュガーレイズド·ハピネス)	February 12, 2007
Summer vacation is coming up, which means final exams to take. The student council is working hard on promoting the student festival and the preparations are going better than expected. The night before their last exam, Mika goes to Mutsuki's house with the pretense of studying, but they both end up going out and having fun all night long. At the end of the episode, it is shown that Mutsuki has joined the student council as the assistant.
7	"The End of Summer (Bye-Bye)"; Transliteration: "Natsu no Oshimai (Baibai)" (Japanese: なつのおしまい(ばいばい))	February 19, 2007
It's the last day of summer vacation, and the student council is working very hard in order to finish some planning for the upcoming student festival. However, after working for so long, the group has lost most of its morale. The student council president from Aikoh, Takako Kakuzawa, visits Seioh to see how they are coming along with the planning of the student council.
8	"Fight! Seioh Student Council"; Transliteration: "Tatakae Seiō Seitokai!" (Japanese: たたかえ聖桜生徒会!)	February 26, 2007
The principal of Seioh High School announces the merger of Seioh and Aikoh High School and the cancellation of the Seioh School Fair. In order to try to change the minds of the administration, Manabi and the student council begin a petition campaign. Later, Manabi returns home to find her brother with his girlfriend, Kyoko Kiyokawa — who happens to be the superintendent of Aikoh High School.
9	"Our Song"; Transliteration: "Watashitachi no Uta" (Japanese: わたしたちのうた)	March 5, 2007
The student council has been given a week to try to gain enough signatures via a petition to save the student festival, but are having serious trouble even getting a single signature. When all seems lost, Momoha manages to take over the school's broadcasting room while she shows clips of the student council working to help improve the school. While initially unsuccessful, this endeavor helped re-energize the student council's spirit.
10	"Gathered Friends"; Transliteration: "Tsudō Nakamatachi" (Japanese: 集う仲間たち)	March 12, 2007
The time draws near for the deadline to gain at least 70% approval from the students of Seioh for student festival, but unexpectedly the clock in the clock tower blows up, destroying the student council room along with it. Just when things look bleak, Shimojima shows Manami and her friends the old, abandoned Seioh boarding house and they start to clean it up to create a new student council room. Eventually, more students start coming and a huge group effort is underway to clean up the entire boarding house.
11	"We're Also Watching"; Transliteration: "Watashi ni mo Mieru yo" (Japanese: わたしにもみえるよ)	March 19, 2007
The school festival is finally underway after receiving 76% approval from the students of Seioh, and the entire school is having fun in what will be the last school festival for Seioh High School. Throughout most of the day, the student council stays out of the festival's affairs, but near the end of the day Manami is able to sing a song for the entire school.
12	"The Cherry Blossom Colored Futures"; Transliteration: "Sakurairo no Miraitachi" (Japanese: 桜色の未来たち)	March 26, 2007
It is now two years later and the girls are just about to graduate from high school. Everyone is reflecting on the past few years at Seioh and are looking toward the future to where they are going. Mika decides to go to America after graduation and study abroad and her friends are there to see her off.
OVA	"It's Summer! It's Manabi! It's a Training Camp!"; Transliteration: "Natsu da! Manabi da! Kyōkagasshuku da!" (Japanese: 夏だ!まなびだ!強化合宿だ!)	October 10, 2007
This episode takes place between episodes six and seven from the regular broadcast. Manami and her friends raise money for a trip during summer vacation, but when on the day they go, a storm blows through, and they have to cancel their plans. Instead, they stay in a local hotel in a rural area overnight and go back to their town the following day.

=== Visual novel ===
A visual novel developed by Marvelous Interactive for the PlayStation 2 titled Gakuen Utopia Manabi Straight! Kira Kira Happy Festa! (がくえんゆーとぴあ まなびストレート! キラキラ☆Happy Festa!, Gakuen Yūtopia Manabi Sutorēto! Kira Kira☆Happy Festa!) was first released on March 29, 2007, in limited and regular editions. The limited edition came bundled with a thirty-minute length drama CD and two background music CDs. The gameplay consists of the player interacting with the game by making choices at key times in the story. While the game consists of several different scenarios, the main one takes place during the summer festival. In the scenario, Manami needs the cooperation and comprehension of the town people in order to ensure the success of the event. Manami and her friends go through various missions in the game while they work and help the people in town get ready for the festival. As an original system built into the game, Manami has the power to give her friends "Hustle Points" that she uses to cheer her friends up during their various missions. An album titled Miracle Straight! was released on April 4, 2007, containing the opening and ending themes to the video game sung by Yui Horie, Ai Nonaka, Marina Inoue, Aya Hirano and Saki Fujita.
