= Divi-Dead =

1998 video game

- Developer: C's Ware
- Publishers: NA: Himeya Soft; EU: Otaku Publishing
- Composer: Masafumi Ogata
- Platform: Microsoft Windows
- Release: JP: January 23, 1998
- Genre: Visual novel
- Mode: Single player

Divi-Dead is a 1998 eroge visual novel game made by C's Ware. The story begins the day after the protagonist transfers to Kanoyama Academy High School. The principal of this boarding school is the protagonist's untrustworthy uncle. The protagonist decides that the reason he is transferring schools is to investigate, report, or resolve a scandal that involves emotionally unstable and violent students that's related to the presence to the "fragrance" that is secretly spreading around the school.

Dengeki Hime magazine said the game was among the top five highest selling bishōjo games released in the first half of 1998. The game received a release in English, making it one of the earliest erotic Japanese horror video games released to Western audiences.

== Gameplay ==
The authors of The History and Allure of Interactive Visual Novels (2023) described Divi-Dead as a horror eroge (erotic game) visual novel, which combined both sexual content and graphic violence.

== Release ==
Divi Dead was released in Japan for Windows 95-based home computers on January 23, 1998. Dengeki Hime listed the game as the fourth best selling bishōjo game released between January 1 and May 31 1998. A reviewer commented that the best selling games were the ones that had voiced dialogue. Towards the late 90s, bishōjo game designers could take advantage of Windows 98 and CD-ROM technology to add content such as voice-acting to these games.

The Japanese publisher Himeya Soft opened a California-based subsidiary in 1998 called Himeya Soft USA. The group had partnered with C's Ware to release their adult games for Western audiences, which included Divi Dead.

== Reception ==
A review in Dengeki Hime complimented the games atmosphere and found the frequency of the sex scenes being low, being more of a horror story and recommended the game to fans of the latter genre.

From retrospective reviews, the Italian video game magazine The Games Machine complimented the release as having a good plot with interesting puzzles while only recommending them to audiences a palate for the hybrid of horror and erotic content. The authors of The History and Allure of Interactive Visual Novels described that the English version of the game to "jarring given questionable translation choices" and that its narrative was both "urgent and almost ploddingly slow" when explaining the information on the murders, the school's history and the characters. They found it still maintained "an aura of intrigue due to the mysterious nature of both the school and the characters."

== Legacy ==
For many Westerners, the release of Divi-Dead was their first exposure to erotic Japanese horror in video games and would be their introduction to its tropes.
