= Kurogane Communication =

Japanese manga series

- First volume of the Go! Comi English release of the series. Cover characters, from top left to bottom right are: Haruka, Angela, Reeves, Cleric, Spike, and Trigger.

鉄コミュニケイション (Kurogane Komyunikeishon)
- Genre: Adventure, mecha, science fiction
- Manga
- Written by: Hideo Kato
- Illustrated by: Tomomasa Takuma
- Published by: MediaWorks
- English publisher: NA: Go! Comi
- Magazine: Dengeki Daioh
- Original run: 1997 – 1999
- Volumes: 3
- Anime television series
- Directed by: Yasuhito Kikuchi
- Written by: Mitsuhiro Yamada
- Music by: Kenji Kawai
- Studio: A.P.P.P.
- Licensed by: NA: Media Blasters
- Original network: Wowow
- English network: US: iaTV
- Original run: October 5, 1998 – March 29, 1999
- Episodes: 24
- Light novel
- Written by: Mizuhito Akiyama
- Illustrated by: Tomomasa Takuma
- Published by: MediaWorks
- Imprint: Dengeki Bunko
- Original run: October 10, 1998 – March 10, 1999
- Volumes: 2

Kurogane Communication (Japanese: 鉄コミュニケイション, Hepburn: Kurogane Komyunikeishon; "Iron Communication") is a Japanese manga series written by Hideo Kato and illustrated by Tomomasa Takuma. The individual chapters were originally serialized in Dengeki Daioh in 1997 and published in three tankōbon volume by MediaWorks. Set in a post-apocalyptic world in which a lone human survivor, a girl named Haruka, lives with a family of five robots. The manga series is licensed for an English language release in North America by Go! Comi.

A 24-episode anime television series adaptation animated by A.P.P.P. premiered in Japan on Wowow on October 5, 1998, and ran until its conclusion on March 29, 1999. The anime series was released to Region 1 DVD in North America by Media Blasters. A two volume light novel series, written by Mizuhito Akiyama, was also published in Japan 1998 and 1999 by MediaWorks under their Dengeki Bunko label.

== Plot ==
Haruka is an ordinary 13-year-old girl, but her life is extraordinary because as far as she knows, she is the sole human survivor of a global nuclear war. Surviving the war in cold sleep, she is awakened by five robots about 30 years later. Things are fine, but she is constantly haunted by sudden flashbacks and dreams about her parents. There is also a constant danger of roving war machines and threats like water depletion, yet despite all this, life is still in quite good shape. The robots are her family and friends, and do everything they can to help the human girl. However, deep inside Haruka is yearning to meet other surviving humans.

In the ending of the anime adaption, Haruka discovers that surviving humans left Earth to build a colony on Mars, and she takes a surviving battleship to join them. The epilogue shows her years later when she returns to Earth with a daughter and meets her old robot comrades.

== Characters ==
- Haruka is a 13-year-old girl, and initially the only known human survivor on earth. During the final war, her parents put her in a cold sleep chamber, sacrificing themselves to help the machine obtain the necessary temperature. She slept in the machine for thirty years before being discovered by her robot family a year before the time frame the series is set in. Her thinking is very positive and she is a hardworking person. She loves all the robots and considers them her family. In the anime series, she is voiced by Yui Horie in Japanese, and Julie Maddalena in English.
- Spike is a domestic robot constructed to look like a humanoid. Spike's job is mostly to keep up with Haruka and repair some mechanical equipment. In the anime series, he is voiced by Hiromi Ishikawa in Japanese, and Mona Marshall in English.
- Angela is a dueling robot, resembling a human female in her twenties. She masks her face and initially hates humans and wanted the other robots to kill the sleeping Haruka rather than wake her. She eventually warms to Haruka when Haruka gives her an Angela Rose. Her job is to protect Haruka and the others from hostile robots that may attack and any other dangers. In the anime series, she is voiced by Rica Fukami in Japanese, and Wendee Lee in English.
- Reeves is a mean-looking, but effeminate speaking maintenance robot with high skill levels in matters like cooking. Reeves sometimes acts as Haruka's father figure. In the anime series, he is voiced by Norio Horiuchi in Japanese, and Kirk Thornton in English.
- Cleric is the group's source of information who gathers and processes data. He also serves as the "teacher" of Haruka and the others, holding daily lectures. In the anime series, he is voiced by Houchu Ohtsuka in Japanese, and Dave Mallow in English.
- Trigger is a ball-shaped robot who likes to collect guns. In the anime series, he is voiced by Junko Shimakata in Japanese, and Wendee Lee in English.
- Kanato is a boy similar to Haruka's age whom Haruka and the others discover living in some jungle ruins. Unlike Haruka, he hates machines and robots, abusing his own and acting very aggressively. He treasures his mother-robot with both disgust and respect. After meeting Haruka and getting to know her, he begins to develop romantic feelings for her. In the anime series, he is voiced by Yuka Imai in Japanese, and Dave Wittenberg in English.
- Honi is Kanato's guardian robot. Designed for war and having a programming glitch, Honi desires to kill all humans but Kanato. In the anime series, he is voiced by Akio Ohtsuka in Japanese, and Michael McConnohie in English.
- Lillith & Alice are Kanato's robot-servants, constructed to look like teenager girls with jewels in their foreheads. They are obsessed with their master and even show signs of human love. In the anime series, they are voiced by Etsuko Kozakura and Naomi Nagasawa, respectively in Japanese, and Wendee Lee and Julie Ann Taylor, respectively in English.

== Media ==
=== Manga ===
Written by Hideo Kato and illustrated by Tomomasa Takuma, Kurogane Communication was serialized in Dengeki Daioh in 1997. The individual chapters were also published in three tankōbon volumes by MediaWorks in September 1998. It is licensed for an English language release in North America by Go! Comi, which released the first on July 1, and the second on September 15, 2008.

=== Anime ===
A 24-episode anime television series adaptation animated by A.P.P.P. premiered in Japan on Wowow on October 5, 1998, and ran until its conclusion on March 29, 1999. It was released to Region 1 DVD in North America by Media Blasters.

The series uses two pieces of theme songs, both performed by Yui Horie. "my best friend" is used for the opening, while "Dear mama" is used for the ending.

=== Light novels ===
A two volume light novel adaptation, written by Mizuhito Akiyama, was published in Japan on October 10, 1998, and March 10, 1999, by MediaWorks under their Dengeki Bunko label.

== See also ==
- Songs of Kurogane Communication
