= A Tropical Fish Yearns for Snow =

Japanese manga series

- Volume 2 cover showing Konatsu Amano (left) and Koyuki Honami (right)

熱帯魚は雪に焦がれる (Nettaigyo wa Yuki ni Kogareru)
- Genre: Comedy, drama
- Manga
- Written by: Makoto Hagino
- Published by: ASCII Media Works
- English publisher: NA: Viz Media
- Magazine: Dengeki Maoh
- Original run: June 27, 2017 – March 27, 2021
- Volumes: 9

A Tropical Fish Yearns for Snow (熱帯魚は雪に焦がれる, Nettaigyo wa Yuki ni Kogareru) is a Japanese manga series by Makoto Hagino. It was serialized in ASCII Media Works' Dengeki Maoh magazine from June 2017 to March 2021. Viz Media licensed the manga for release in North America and began releasing it in November 2019.

== Plot ==
Konatsu Amano is a teenage girl from Tokyo who has to move to a new school in a seaside town. After meeting Koyuki Honami, a considerate and well-regarded older girl who is the only student in their school's Aquarium Club, Konatsu joins the club so she can spend more time with Koyuki.

== Publication ==
A Tropical Fish Yearns for Snow is written and illustrated by Makoto Hagino. It was serialized in ASCII Media Works' Dengeki Maoh magazine from the August 2017 issue sold on June 27, 2017, to the May 2021 issue sold on March 27, 2021. Nine tankōbon volumes were published from December 27, 2017, to June 25, 2021. Viz Media licensed the series for release in North America and began releasing it in November 2019.

No.	Original release date	Original ISBN	English release date	English ISBN
1	December 27, 2017	978-4-04-893470-1	November 12, 2019	978-1-9747-1043-0
1. "Konatsu Amano Isn't Sad." (天野小夏は悲しまない。, Amano Konatsu wa Kanashimanai.); 2. "Koyuki Honami Isn't Happy." (帆波小雪は浮かれない。, Honami Koyuki wa Ukarenai.); 3. "Konatsu Amano Can't Hide It." (天野小夏は隠せない。, Amano Konatsu wa Kakusenai.); 4. "Koyuki Honami Can't Bear It." (帆波小雪は我慢出来ない。, Honami Koyuki wa Gaman Dekinai.); Afterword (あとがき, Atogaki)
2	April 27, 2018	978-4-04-893722-1	February 11, 2020	978-1-9747-1059-1
5. "Konatsu Amano Doesn't Ask." (天野小夏は尋ねない。, Amano Konatsu wa Tazunenai.); 6. "Koyuki Honami Can't Take a Step Forward." (帆波小雪は踏み込めない。, Honami Koyuki wa Fumikomenai.); 7. "Koyuki Honami Can't Reply." (帆波小雪は返せない。, Honami Koyuki wa Kaesenai.); 8. "Konatsu Amano Isn't Alone." (天野小夏はひとりじゃない。, Amano Konatsu wa Hitori Janai.); Afterword (あとがき, Atogaki)
3	August 25, 2018	978-4-04-912087-5	May 12, 2020	978-1-9747-1060-7
9. "Konatsu Amano Doesn't Know." (天野小夏はわからない。, Amano Konatsu wa Wakaranai.); 10. "Koyuki Honami Can't Concentrate." (帆波小雪は集中できない。, Honami Koyuki wa Shūchū Dekinai.); 11. "Konatsu Amano Can't Find a Friend." (天野小夏は見付けられない。, Amano Konatsu wa Mitsukerarenai.); 12. "Konatsu Amano Does It Herself." (天野小夏は頼らない。, Amano Konatsu wa Tayoranai.); Afterword (あとがき, Atogaki)
4	January 25, 2019	978-4-04-912297-8	August 11, 2020	978-1-9747-1544-2
13. "Koyuki Honami Can't Sleep." (帆波小雪は眠らない。, Honami Koyuki wa Nemuranai.); 14. "Koyuki Honami Can't Be Sure." (帆波小雪はたしかめない。, Honami Koyuki wa Tashikamenai.); 15. "Koyuki Honami Can't Adapt." (帆波小雪はなじめない。, Honami Koyuki wa Najimenai.); 16. "Koyuki Honami Can't Hide It." (帆波小雪は演じない。, Honami Koyuki wa Enjinai.); Afterword (あとがき, Atogaki)
5	June 27, 2019	978-4-04-912591-7	November 10, 2020	978-1-9747-1549-7
17. "Koyuki Honami Isn't Cold." (帆波小雪は寒くない。, Honami Koyuki wa Samukunai.); 18. "Koyuki Honami Isn't Bored." (帆波小雪は退屈しない。, Honami Koyuki wa Taikutsushinai.); 19. "Koyuki Honami Doesn't Move Forward." (帆波小雪は進めない。, Honami Koyuki wa Susumenai.); 20. "Kaede Hirose Doesn't Notice." (広瀬楓は気付かない。, Hirose Kaede wa Kizukanai.); Afterword (あとがき, Atogaki)
6	December 27, 2019	978-4-04-912931-1	February 9, 2021	978-1-9747-2068-2
21. "Konatsu Amano Was Sad." (天野小夏は悲しんだ。, Amano Konatsu wa Kanashinda.); 22. "Konatsu Amano Can't Breathe." (天野小夏は息ができない。, Amano Konatsu wa Iki ga Dekinai.); 23. "Konatsu Amano Can't Talk About It." (天野小夏は吐き出せない。, Amano Konatsu wa Hakidasenai.); 24. "Konatsu Amano Can't Break Free." (天野小夏は抜け出せない。, Amano Konatsu wa Nukedasenai.); Afterword (あとがき, Atogaki)
7	June 26, 2020	978-4-04-913171-0	May 11, 2021	978-1-9747-2225-9
25. "Koyuki Honami Doesn't Notice." (帆波小雪は気付けない。, Honami Koyuki wa Kizukenai.); 26. "Konatsu Amano Doesn't Drown." (天野小夏は溺れない。, Amano Konatsu wa Oborenai.); 27. "Konatsu Amano Doesn't Stop." (天野小夏は立ち止まらない。, Amano Konatsu wa Tachitomaranai.); 27.5 "Konatsu Amano Is Unaware of It." (天野小夏は意識しない。, Amano Konatsu wa Ishikishinai.) Afterword (あとがき, Atogaki)
8	December 26, 2020	978-4-04-913593-0	December 14, 2021	978-1-9747-2524-3
9	June 25, 2021	978-4-04-913874-0	July 26, 2022	978-1-9747-3011-7

== Reception ==
In 2018, the manga ranked 10th in the print category of the Next Manga Awards.
