= La storia della Arcana Famiglia =

Video game, anime, and manga series

アルカナ・ファミリア
- Genre: Adventure, reverse harem romance
- Video game
- Developer: HuneX
- Publisher: Comfort
- Genre: Otome game, Visual novel
- Platform: PlayStation Portable; Nintendo Switch
- Released: JP: October 27, 2011; WW: July 24, 2025
- Manga

Arcana Famiglia: Amore Mangiare Cantare!
- Written by: HuneX
- Illustrated by: Ruru
- Published by: ASCII Media Works
- Magazine: Sylph
- Original run: December 2011 – December 2013
- Volumes: 4
- Video game

Arcana Famiglia -Vascello Phantasma no Majutsushi-
- Developer: HuneX
- Publisher: Comfort
- Genre: Otome game, Visual novel
- Platform: PlayStation Portable
- Released: June 21, 2012
- Anime television series
- Directed by: Chiaki Kon
- Produced by: Kozue Kaneniwa; Mika Nomura; Hiroyuki Ōmori; Fuminori Yamazaki; Takanori Honma
- Written by: Masanao Akahoshi
- Music by: Yasuhiro Misawa
- Studio: J.C.Staff
- Licensed by: AUS: Hanabee; NA: Sentai Filmworks; UK: MVM Films
- Original network: Sun TV, Chiba TV
- English network: SEA: Animax Asia
- Original run: July 1, 2012 – September 16, 2012
- Episodes: 12 + OVA
- Video game

Arcana Famiglia -Festa Regalo!-
- Developer: HuneX
- Publisher: Comfort
- Genre: Otome game, Visual novel
- Platform: PlayStation Portable
- Released: December 13, 2012
- Video game

Arcana Famiglia 2
- Developer: HuneX
- Publisher: Comfort
- Genre: Otome game, Visual novel
- Platform: PlayStation Portable
- Released: November 14, 2013
- Video game

La storia della Arcana Famiglia- Ancora
- Developer: HuneX
- Publisher: Comfort
- Genre: Otome game, Visual novel
- Platform: PlayStation Vita
- Released: December 23, 2015

La storia della Arcana Famiglia (アルカナ・ファミリア, Arukana Famiria; Italian for "The Story of the Arcane Family") is a Japanese visual novel made by HuneX and Comfort. The first game was released on October 27, 2011, for the PlayStation Portable (PSP).

A fan disc also for the PSP titled Arcana Famiglia -Vascello Phantasma no Majutsushi- (アルカナ・ファミリア -幽霊船（ヴァスチェロ・ファンタズマ）の魔術師-; lit., "Arcana Famiglia -The Phantom Ship Magician-") was released on June 21, 2012, featuring two new characters: Ash and Joshua. The first game has been adapted into a manga and anime series along with various franchise-related merchandise such as drama CDs, music CDs, and fanbooks, etc.

== Plot ==
There is an organization called the Arcana Famiglia, which protects the island of Regalo (Italian for "gift" or "present"). The Famiglia is made up of people who have made contracts with Arcana cards, and have received special abilities due to this. On his birthday celebration, Mondo has decided it is time for him to retire and give up his title to a new boss who has control over an Arcana. To decide who in the "family" gets this title, he calls for a tournament, called the Arcana Duello, between Arcana users. To the winner, he promises the title of "Papa", a wish of the winner's choice and his daughter's hand in marriage. Refusing to accept this, Felicità decides to fight to choose her own path, with Libertà and Nova fighting for her freedom by her side.

== Characters ==
=== Regalo ===
Felicità (フェリチータ)
Voiced by: Mamiko Noto (Japanese); Luci Christian (English)
The only daughter of Arcana Famiglia's boss, Mondo, as well as the leader of Sword and the protagonist of the games. Bears a contract with #6 of the Arcana – The Lovers, makes her able to read people's hearts and later, she finds out that she has another Arcana – The Wheel of Fortune (#10), makes her able to change the relationship of a tarocco and the host in it. Most Arcana Famiglia members call her "Milady". She is strict on herself and others and always strives, but is also a bit innocent and pure in some ways. She is always accompanied by her owl, Fukulota. She is also noted to be a strong, excellent fighter. During the games, she is able to defeat all of the other members except for Libertà and Nova, who she never got a chance to fight against. Libertà and Nova lost consciousness during their battle against each other and were unable to continue participating in the games. Thus Felicità fights her father and wins the duello. She wishes for her father to continue as the Papa of the Arcana Famiglia.
Libertà (リベルタ)
Voiced by: Jun Fukuyama (Japanese); Blake Shepard (English)
Bears a contract with #0 of the Arcana – The Fool, also the member of Intelligence. He calls Felicità "Princess". He loves masked heroes and admired Dante very much. A boy who is always curious and loves new things. He believes himself to be a Man of the Sea, and he is even more impulsive than Felicità. His memories got sealed by Dante because of his Arcana power went uncontrollable and he was also the reason why Dante went bald. His Arcana Mark is on his forehead with the power to make whatever he says happen. He cares a lot for Felicità.
Nova (ノヴァ)
Voiced by: Tsubasa Yonaga (Japanese); Kara Greenberg (English)
Bears a contract with #13 of the Arcana – Death and the leader of Holy Grail. He is Felicità's cousin and Mondo's nephew. His father, Moreno, is Mondo's older brother. He calls Felicità "Fel", which is his nickname for her. Libertà calls him "chickpea" due to his short stature. His Arcana sign is on the back of his neck and his power is to put people in sleep. He is talented despite his young age and because of this, stands at the top of his division. He put his parents into a deep eternal sleep when he overheard them plotting rebellion against Mondo and Sumire, so Nova would be the leader instead. But later, with the help of Felicità and also Mondo, he is able to wake them up again. He was engaged to Felicità when they were young but after the incident with his parents, he broke off the engagement. However, he still cares for her and is still in love with her.
Debito (デビト)
Voiced by: Hiroyuki Yoshino (Japanese); Jay Hickman (English)
Bears a contract with #9 of the Arcana – The Hermit, his ability is to make himself invisible with the Arcana Mark on his foot, near his ankle. Bipolar leader of Coins who hates to be tied and loves to flirt, including Felicità. He has a foul mouth, but he is actually a good big brother figure. He covered his right eye with an eye-patch to cover his artificial eye that is used to control his Arcana power, made by Jolly. Debito calls Felicità "Bambina", which means "little girl" in Italian.
Pace (パーチェ)
Voiced by: Tomokazu Sugita (Japanese); Kyle Jones (English)
Bears a contract with #11 of the Arcana – Strength, which makes his strength akin to that of a monster and has an Arcana Mark on his hand. Like Libertà, he also calls Felicità "Princess". He loves lasagna very much and has very bad eyesight. He is the leader of the Wands, and is the cheerful mood-maker of the Family. When the director is away, he also acts as Substitute Captain, which involves handling negotiations and managing the different divisions and the civilians, though usually he uses his fist better than his mouth.
Luca (ルカ)
Voiced by: Yūichi Nakamura (Japanese); Clint Bickham (English)
Felicità's personal attendant. The bearer of Arcana Temperance (#14) and has the Mark on his tongue. He, Debito and Pace are old friends. He is Jolly's pupil as well as his son. He's been taking care of Felicità ever since she was a child. He's amazing at all things domestic, including cooking. He also trained Felicità, is rather clingy with Felicità, and worries about her too much. It sometimes seems that he likes Felicità more than a friend. He loves to tinker with alchemy. At the end of the manga, Luca and Felicità profess their love for one another.
Dante (ダンテ)
Voiced by: Jūrōta Kosugi (Japanese); Andrew Love (English)
The director of the Arcana Famiglia and the bearer of The Emperor (#4) and his power is to remove or manipulate memories. He is also the leader of Intelligence. He's a former pirate who was taken in by Mondo. A very reliable and one of the most trustworthy people in the Family, and made him very popular with the people. He's like a father to Libertà since the time he saved him. His Arcana Mark is on his head.
Jolly (ジョーリィ)
Voiced by: Kōji Yusa (Japanese); Chuck Huber (English)
Mondo's right-hand man, and the second highest ranking member in the Family who bears Arcana – The Moon (#18) with a Mark on his right eye. His power lets him forcibly draw out a person's memory. He is the family advisor, but because of his cold-hearted and emotionless actions and words, almost everyone on the island avoids him as the very incarnation of terror. He is also the best at Alchemy on the island. He is also Luca's father, though his actual age is unknown. His main weapon is Alchemy. He was born on March 8th with the horoscope of Pisces. He is 184 cm high and has the hobby of experimenting. He is voiced by Tomo Muranaka as a kid.
Ash (アッシュ)
Voiced by: Nobuhiko Okamoto
A new character in Arcana Famiglia: Vascello Phantasma no Majutsushi. Bears a contract with #01 of the Arcana – The Magician. He is introduced with Joshua in Vascello Fantasma no Majutsushi. He appears in Arcana Famiglia sequel, Arcana Famiglia 2.
Elmo (エルモ)
Voiced by: Misato Fukuen (Japanese); Tiffany Grant (English) (Arcana Famiglia), Yūichi Iguchi (Arcana Famiglia 2)
An artificial child created and raised by Jolly. In spite of his young age, he has a contract with The Tower, Arcana (#16). He becomes capturable character in Arcana Famiglia 2. Elmo first appears in the anime television series in episode 3, Piccolino.
Mondo (モンド)
Voiced by: Fumihiko Tachiki (Japanese); Rob Mungle (English)
Bears a contract with #21 of the Arcana – The World. Felicità's father and the boss of Arcana Famiglia. Everyone in the organization calls him "Papa". He may be harsh at times, but he is really a frank and good-natured guy. He is also one of those fathers who can't say no to their daughters, until the Arcana Duello comes along when he wanted Felicità to be more reliable as the lady or getting married with his reliable companions.
Sumire (スミレ)
Voiced by: Kikuko Inoue (Japanese); Shelley Calene-Black (English)
The mother of Felicità and does fortunetelling for the Family with her Judgement Arcana (#20). Everyone in the family calls her "Mama". She has a mysterious air around her, but she is a refined lady. Like Mondo, though, she has a doting aspect to her personality for her daughter, despite giving her a strict upbringing.

=== Nordia ===
Serafino (セラフィーノ)
Voiced by: Yūki Ono
New character in Arcana Famiglia 2.
Teo (テオ)
Voiced by: Ryōta Ōsaka
New character in Arcana Famiglia 2.
Vir (ウィル, Wiru)
Voiced by: Daisuke Hirakawa
New character in Arcana Famiglia 2.
Neve (ネーヴェ)
Voiced by: Sayuri Yahagi
New character in Arcana Famiglia 2.
Agata (アガタ)
Voiced by: Miki Itō
New character in Arcana Famiglia 2.

=== Others ===
Joshua (ヨシュア)
Voiced by: Yūji Ueda
A new character in Arcana Famiglia: Vascello Phantasma no Majutsushi. Bears a contract with #08 of the Arcana – Justice. A video game character only. Joshua is Mondo's son, Libertà's father and Felicità's half-brother.

== Media ==
=== Games ===
The original game, simply titled La storia della Arcana Famiglia, was released for the PlayStation Portable on October 27, 2011. On December 23, 2015, a port of the game was released for the PlayStation Vita under the title -La storia della Arcana Famiglia- Ancora (アルカナ・ファミリア -La storia della Arcana Famiglia- Ancora) was released. The game was ported to the Nintendo Switch and Steam on July 24, 2025, under the title La storia della Arcana Famiglia: Rinato (アルカナ・ファミリア Rinato, Arukana Famiria Rinato), it was released in English and Chinese (Simplified and Traditional).

A fan disc for the original game, titled Arcana Famiglia -Vascello Phantasma no Majutsushi- (アルカナ・ファミリア -幽霊船（ヴァスチェロ・ファンタズマ）の魔術師-; lit., "Arcana Famiglia -The Phantom Ship Magician-"), was released on June 21, 2012, featuring two new characters: Ash and Joshua.

A spin-off cooking game titled Arcana Famiglia -Festa Regalo!- (アルカナ・ファミリア フェスタ・レガーロ; lit., "Arcana Famiglia -Holiday Gift!-") was released on December 13, 2012.

A fourth installment, Arcana Famiglia 2 (アルカナ・ファミリア2), which continues the story fromVascello Phantasma no Majutsushi, was released on November 14, 2013.

=== Manga ===
A manga based on the game, titled Arcana Famiglia: Amore Mangiare Cantare!, began publishing in the comic magazine Sylph in 2011. The manga features art by Ruru (Artist).

No.	Release date	ISBN
1	June 22, 2012	4048867180
2	February 22, 2013	404891295X
3	November 22, 2013	4048919563
4	June 20, 2014	4048666592

=== Anime ===
An anime adaptation produced by J.C.Staff began airing in July 2012. The anime is licensed by Sentai Filmworks in North America. The series originally aired from July 1, 2012, to September 16, 2012; with direction by Chiaki Kon, character design by Mai Matsuura and art direction by Takahiro Yokeda. The anime series follows Felicità, the only daughter of Mondo, the soon-to-be-retired boss of the mafia organization Arcana Famiglia. Mondo creates a tournament among the Arcana users to determine the new heir to the organization. However, as Felicità unfortunately learns that the prize of the tournament includes her to be betrothed to the winner, she decides to join this tournament herself and choose her own path, receiving support from Libertà and Nova to achieve her goal. The opening song for the anime was "Magenta Another Sky" by Hitomi Harada, while the ending was "Pieces of Treasure" by Jun Fukuyama and Tsubasa Yonaga, who voice Libertà and Nova respectively.

From the second to seventh episode, one of Arcana Famiglia members is forced to do something as punishment for breaking a rule of the mansion.

No.	Title	Original release date
1	"The Night of The Birthday" (La notte del compleanno); Transliteration: "Tanjōbi no Yoru" (Japanese: 誕生日の夜)	July 1, 2012
The Arcana Famiglia members are introduced, in which each of them bear a contract with an Arcana power. During the birthday party for Mondo, the leader of the Arcana Famiglia, he announces that he plans to retire as the head of the organization in two months and that his successor will be the winner of the Arcana Duello, a fighting tournament among the Arcana Famiglia members. The winner will also marry his daughter, Felicità, who is very unhappy with the decision, and this briefly causes a ruckus among the members. Later, Libertà and Nova both assure Felicità that she does not have to get married if one of them wins the Arcana Duello.
2	"Commander of The Animal Protection Team" (Il Comandante della Squadra Protezione Animali); Transliteration: "Dōbutsu Hogo Chīmu no Shireikan" (Japanese: 動物保護チームの司令官)	July 8, 2012
Felicità remembers when she was first welcomed into the organization and respected by the members, but is soon reminded about the upcoming Arcana Duello. Later, Felicità and Libertà help Nova find a stray white kitten that has been wandering inside the mansion, though it was quite a struggle just to catch it. As they search for the owner of the kitten, they seek help from Debito, who narrows down the list of women due to the ribbon around the kitten's neck and its scent. After Felicità is able to read the kitten's heart using The Lovers and see the face of its owner, a blonde woman wearing a fancy blue dress, the three are directed to a dress store owned by the woman named Federica. As a token of her appreciation, Federica gives Felicità a white frilly dress. On the way home, Libertà and Nova tell Felicità that she should learn to control The Lovers and should not randomly read the hearts of others. This gives Felicità the determination to win the Arcana Duello herself. Nova is forced to sing an embarrassing song as punishment for letting a kitten wander inside the mansion.
3	"Piccolino" (Piccolino); Transliteration: "Pikkorīno" (Japanese: ピッコリーノ)	July 15, 2012
Nova tells Felicità and Libertà that the housemaid Isabella saw a ghost earlier in the kitchen, but it is later learned that Luca used a white cloth and broom to scare Pace, who ate the entire first batch of baked sweets while sleepwalking. The baked sweets are for the Piccolino, an annual event held at the church to entertain children. After Luca performs a boring magic trick, Debito tells the children a scary story as a joke, in which an orphan was killed by a demon and its ghost still haunts the church. Luca and Pace recall when they would play with Debito inside the church when they were all kids. After lunch, Pace and Debito play soccer with the children, but end up hurting Luca in the process. Meanwhile, Sumire convinces Nova to participate in the Piccolino this year, despite the fact that Nova has trouble kindly interacting with children. As the children retreat inside the church due to a storm, they are all eventually escorted to their homes. After Debito escorts the last two children who were left with Felicità and Libertà, Nova arrives and catches sight of a child who was left behind named Elmo. Libertà retrieves a blanket for Elmo, but the latter chooses to leave the church instead, despite Nova's plea. Elmo is nowhere to be found when Nova chases after him to the outside. Debito is forced to drink a cup of tea as punishment for his obscene language used in the church in front of the children, but this makes him act a little too proper.
4	"Confession of a Mask" (Confessioni di una maschera); Transliteration: "Kamen no Kokuhaku" (Japanese: 仮面の告白)	July 22, 2012
Felicità and Libertà are tasked by Surmire to deliver a scarf to a woman named Jovanna, who gave a brooch to Sumire in the past. However, due to the sudden recollections of his past with Dante, Libertà becomes disturbed to the point where he and Felicità accidentally fall off a roof and destroy a shop. Having to spend the rest of the day working for the shop owner, Felicità and Libertà luckily run into Jovanna and give her the scarf. When Libertà discovers a familiar mask in the shop, he suddenly remembers that a masked man saved him from an orphanage. Later, Felicità accidentally looks into Dante's heart and sees a fragment of Libertà's past. She consults Dante, who reveals that it was ten years ago when he was indeed the masked man who came to the orphanage, where experiments were conducted, to save Libertà, who inadvertently set it on fire by wishing for it to happen. In response, Dante sealed away Libertà's memories using The Emperor, which caused him to be bald, while Mondo sealed away Libertà's Arcana power, The Fool. After Libertà storms off when Felicità declines his request to read his heart, Dante tells Libertà that his memories are still sealed because he is not strong enough to accept his past just yet. Nova then tells Libertà to become stronger. Dante is forced to allow Felicità to read his heart as punishment, but seeing a bald head as a sunset at the beach makes this image very disturbing.
5	"Childhood Friends" (Amici d'infanzia); Transliteration: "Osananajimi" (Japanese: 幼なじみ)	July 29, 2012
When lemon meringue pie is served at the dining table, Libertà leaves in the middle of eating. Nova confronts Libertà, saying that Felicità has nothing to do with his issue with Dante. After helping Felicità deliver some lemon meringue pies to Sumire, Nova recalls his first time meeting Mondo and Sumire when he was younger, in which he was chosen to marry his cousin Felicità when he becomes older. Later, Felicità and Nova manage to catch some thieves while patrolling the town, returning the wallet back to a woman. Nova tells Felicità that she is destined to become the heir to the Arcana Famiglia, even though she assumes that people do not expect much from her. Nova has a dream about his parents wanting to gain control of the Arcana Famiglia when he becomes betrothed to Felicità. Luca later scolds Nova for being too cold towards Felicità, suggesting that he should be nice to her. Suspicious about an unequal distribution of funds to the research division, Nova sends Felicità to investigate upon the matter. However, on the way there, she encounters Jolly, who changed the lock on the door to the facility and is surprisingly aware of the suspicion. He hands her a stack of documents before she leaves, but she does not know that he is keeping a cylindrical tank with a floating object inside hidden behind a curtain. When Felicità returns to Nova with the documents, Nova stumbles upon his parents' clinical charts. Felicità is shocked when Nova reveals that he put his parents into a deep sleep using his Arcana power, Death, in order to protect Mondo and Sumire from being killed. Seeing that she grew up with a loving family unlike his, Nova tells Felicità to leave him alone for now. Luca is forced to make twenty more lemon meringue pies as punishment, possibly because the pie that he served was too small.
6	"The Board! The Final Battle" (La bordo! La battaglia final); Transliteration: "Onbōdo! – Saigo no Tatakai" (Japanese: オンボード！ – 最後の戦い)	August 5, 2012
Jolly informs the other members that Nova's father Moreno has been kidnapped by pirates on a ship, but tells them to sit back until instructed otherwise. However, Felicità, Libertà and Nova eventually agree to rescue Moreno instead. As the three go to the harbor and enter the ship, they are soon surrounded by the pirates in the main deck. After using Death to put the pirates into a deep sleep, Nova advises Felicità and Libertà to find Moreno before he becomes unconscious and the effect of Death wears off. As Felicità and Libertà later return to Nova with Moreno in tow, they encounter a masked pirate on the upper deck. Both Felicità and Libertà take on the masked pirate together, and Libertà manages to kick the masked pirate into the main mask. However, as the main mast cracks and leans toward Felicità, Libertà remembers how to use The Fool and causes the mast to shatter. Libertà passes out and Felicità is knocked out by the masked pirate, who is revealed to be Dante after his mask cracks, with the pirates as his crew. Dante planned out this entire scheme to help Felicità, Libertà and Nova become stronger in time before the Arcana Duello. The three later wake up in the mansion's underground cellar, where Jolly shuns them for disobeying orders, aside from the fact that Moreno is now safe. After Jolly leaves stating that their Arcana powers were possibly tested, the three wonder how Jolly was aware of what happened on the ship. Libertà is forced to drink a strange cocktail made by Jolly as punishment for encouraging Felicità and Nova to help rescue Moreno, but the effect of the cocktail has him describing his carnal desire for Felicità while he was in the underground cellar with her.
7	"Their Secrets" (Rispettivi segreti); Transliteration: "Sorezore no Himitsu" (Japanese: それぞれの秘密)	August 12, 2012
Libertà and Nova are to personally deliver a letter from Sumire to Felicità, but with no luck of finding her in town. Instead, Libertà and Nova come across a girl who fled from Debito's casino, but Libertà and Nova end up handcuffed together rather than handcuffing the girl, who walks away. While trying to find Felicità, the two run into Jolly, who is shopping for caraway to concoct some medicine. Jolly believes that Luca has been secretly using a large amount of caraway for unknown reasons. Libertà and Nova pass by a fortune teller, who gives them a riddle which leads them to Federica at her dress shop. Meanwhile, Luca brings Felicità, Debito and Pace to his secret base away from the mansion, a place where he harvests a small herb garden yearly. Libertà and Nova follow Federica's kitten to a cave which leads to the herb garden, but the two fall for the traps set by Luca designed to ward off Jolly, having to use each other's swords to bypass them. Once Libertà and Nova meet Felicità, Luca, Debito and Pace in the herb garden during lunchtime, Debito unlocks the handcuffs and Luca shows them a potion containing caraway that was made to lure the kitten from the dress shop to the herb garden. Pace uses his camera to take a picture of all six of them at the herb garden, each of them having a copy for a keepsake. It is shown that Sumire had Jovanna act as the fortune teller. The letter that Felicità received from Sumire told her to kiss Libertà and Nova on their cheeks due to the amount of trouble went through to deliver the letter. Pace is forced to watch Luca and Debito eat a meal in front of him while tied up as punishment, all because Luca intended to take a picture solely with Felicità, but Pace breaks free from the ropes due to his extreme hunger.
8	"The Moon in the Dark" (La luna nel buio); Transliteration: "In za Dāku Mūn" (Japanese: イン·ザ·ダーク·ムーン)	August 19, 2012
Felicità tells Luca that she saw Jolly walking in the streets with Elmo the previous night, but this stirs up a past grudge that Luca has against Jolly. After Felicità and Libertà confirm that Elmo is already acquainted with Jolly, Felicità is requested by Jolly to deliver a letter to Debito. Meanwhile, Luca and Pace discuss about how Debito's right eye under his eye patch is causing him a lot of pain. When Felicità delivers the letter to Debito, he states that his right eye is doing fine. After Pace confronts Jolly for somehow torturing Debito, Felicità asks Pace about the connection among Debito, Luca and Jolly, but Pace tells her not to worry about it. Felicità, Libertà and Nova later take the opportunity to clean the church with the other members. Felicità learns that Debito and Pace fooled around in the church while Luca did most of the cleaning when the three were younger. Jolly arrives at the church, revealing that Debito has an amethyst implanted in place of his right eye to control his Arcana power, The Hermit. Luca, Debito and Pace all received their stigmata, the contract marks placed somewhere on their bodies, from the successful experiments Jolly conducted on them. Later at night, Felicità, Libertà and Nova head to the research division facility, only to discover behind the curtain that Elmo is stored inside the cylindrical tank, in which Jolly explains to them that Elmo is a homunculus created by him.
9	"The Wheel of Fortune" (La ruota della fortuna); Transliteration: "Hoīruobufōchun" (Japanese: ホイールオブフォーチュン)	August 26, 2012
Felicità, Libertà and Nova are called in with the other members for an emergency, in which Mondo seemingly needs rest from exhaustion. Afterwards, Felicità learns from Jolly that Elmo bears a contract with an Arcana power, The Tower. Dante explains that Mondo's Arcana power, The World, hosts the remaining Arcana powers without any hosts, which are slowly consuming Mondo's emotional strength and may soon put him into a coma. It is told that Felicità unconsciously used a second Arcana power, The Wheel of Fortune, thirteen years ago to save Sumire from going berserk after the latter tried to save Mondo with her Arcana power, Judgement. Mondo created the Arcana Duello to find someone who will support Felicità after she might lose him. After asking Sumire why Mondo chose her Arcana power, Felicità reads Mondo's heart, which shows a flashback of when he first chose to bear the contract with The World in order to fight alongside Jolly against enemy soldiers. Since Felicità is unable to control The Lovers at will, Sumire warns Felicità not use The Wheel of Fortune. When Felicità properly learns how use The Lovers on Libertà and Nova while they spar, seeing that they are both determined to win the Arcana Duello, she is then determined to save Mondo using The Wheel of Fortune, not knowing that she may lose her memories.
10	"Arcana Famiglia" (Arcana Famiglia); Transliteration: "Arukana Famiria" (Japanese: アルカナ·ファミリア)	September 2, 2012
Felicità uses The Wheel of Fortune and tries to change the relationship between Mondo and The World, which causes her to lose her memories. Nova explains to Libertà the situation regarding The World of Fortune. Libertà then realizes that the three of them bore their contracts since birth, which Nova believes that the three of them are all related to each other. Libertà is surprised when he finds Nova's engagement ring meant for Felicità inside a dresser drawer while at Nova's house. Jolly anticipated for Felicità to attempt to save Mondo without telling her that she would lose her memories, but this is because Jolly may be the only one who can gain back Felicità's memories using his Arcana power, The Moon, much to the worry of the other members. As Mondo assists Jolly in unbinding Felicità from the thorns in her mind, Libertà and Nova come to the rescue to slash through them. The other members appreciate Jolly for what he has done. At night, while Felicità walks down the corridor, she overhears Dante and Jolly saying that she actually did not change the relationship between Mondo and The World. When she returns to her room, the voice of The Lovers advises her that love cannot be completed alone.
11	"Arcano Triangle" (Arcano triangolo); Transliteration: "Arukano Toraianguru" (Japanese: アーケイン·トライアングル)	September 9, 2012
The next day, Libertà and Nova are relieved that Felicità's memories have returned. Jolly summons Felicità to his office, where she says that The Lovers can negate the consequences of The Wheel of Fortune. Jolly then suggests either Libertà or Nova to be her lover, which would allow her to save Mondo. Libertà and Nova then takes Felicità sailing to celebrate her recovery. Libertà expresses his aspiration to someday surpass Dante in skill, while Nova encourages Libertà to believe in himself. As it begins to rain, Felicità falls overboard, prompting Libertà and Nova to save her and take refuge on a nearby island. Nova finds some driftwood, and Libertà manages to light it on fire using The Fool. Felicità is visited by the voice of the Lovers, who asks her if she found her answer of who she will choose. As Libertà and Nova report back to Dante, Nova blames himself for his actions, while defending Libertà for his achievement. Nova plans to awaken his parents, yet having no regret for putting them to sleep in the first place when he lost control of Death back then, but Libertà tells Nova to be honest with himself instead. Felicità and Libertà convince Nova to head to the library to research on how to awaken his parents. Jolly advises Nova to use Death with an even greater desire to awaken his parents, but with the possibility of it backfiring on him. Nova successfully uses Death and his parents are said to be slowly recovering.
12	"Arcano Duel" (Arcano duello); Transliteration: "Arukano Duerro" (Japanese: アーケイン·決闘)	September 16, 2012
Mondo commences the Arcana Duello, with the victor receiving the title as head of the Arcana Famiglia and earning the right to marry Felicità. During the tournament, Felicità, Libertà, Nova, Debito, Pace and Luca make it to the preliminary rounds. During the preliminary rounds, Felicità wins against Debito, Pace and Luca one by one. Jolly, who withdrew from the tournament, tells the three that Felicità has to use The Wheel of Fortune, which will work after The Lovers can nullify its effects of memory loss, to save Mondo. Libertà and Nova, reminiscing on past memories, each manage to defeat Dante and Sumire, respectively. In the semifinal round, Libertà and Nova fight each other. Felicità reads their hearts, with their determination to win, during their intense match, and she is persistently reminded by the voice of The Lovers to choose one. The match between Libertà and Nova ends in a draw, since they both collapse during the match. In the final round by default, Felicità fights and eventually defeats Mondo, being able to use The Wheel of Fortune without losing her memories to lengthen his life. During the celebration, Felicità wishes for Mondo to remain as head of the Arcana Famiglia for as long as he lives.
OVA	"Capriccio – stile Arcana Famiglia" (Japanese: 奇想曲～アルカナ・ファミリア風)	March 27, 2013
Libertà, Nova, Luca, Debito, Pace and Dante all receive invitations to meet in the dining room, assuming Felicità invited them. When they get there, they see chocolate treats and decide to eat them. Sooner than later, each pair all realize that they switched bodies with each other, which means that Jolly sent the invitations and made the chocolate treats with a personality swapping potion. As they carry out each other's duties during the day, things do not end well for each pair. When they later return to the mansion, they come up with a plan to find the recipe for an antidote while trying to stall Jolly, who was already aware that his potion worked. When the six of them drink the antidote, it turns out that they switched bodies with each other yet again.

=== Other media ===
A light novel, Arcana Famiglia: La Primavera was published by Filia Bunko, a label of Frontier Works. Frontier Works also published a series of drama CDs for the franchise.

== Staff and Development ==
The character designer and main artist for the games is Yomi Sarachi. She also did character design for the comic version and illustrations for the novel. Both the openings for the first game and the fan disc are sung by Hitomi Harada, while the endings of the first game are sung by the voice actor whose character's route has been completed.

== Reception ==
The fan disc Vascello Phantasma no Majutsushi sold 4,854 copies in the first four days it was sold, making it the fifteenth best selling console game in Japan that week.

Carlo Santos of Anime News Network (ANN) reviewed the first half of the anime series. Santos commended the top-notch action scenes and character designs for making the cast look distinct from one another but criticized both the animation and backgrounds for being "a mixed bag of genuine effort and cost-cutting laziness" and the filler approach to storytelling that may cause viewers to lose interest before the second half of the series. Fellow ANN editor Rebecca Silverman reviewed the complete anime series in 2014. While giving praise to the Italian setting and the characterization of both Libertà and Nova, Silverman felt that Felicità lacked development amongst her harem and the overall plot only acted as bookends to the mid-portion adaptation of the game's events. She concluded that devoted harem fans will enjoy aspects of the series but cautioned others to look elsewhere for the action, rom-com story it promised in the beginning.
