= White buffalo (disambiguation) =

White buffalo are bison (American buffalo) that are white in color, instead of the usual brown. Several Native American religions consider them to be sacred signs.

White buffalo may also refer to:

== Animals ==
- A white colored African buffalo
- A white colored water buffalo

== People ==
- White Buffalo (chief) (1862–1929), chief of the Northern Cheyenne
- Francois Botha, South African boxer, nicknamed "The White Buffalo"

== Arts, entertainment, and media ==
=== Fictional entities ===
- White Buffalo, from the video game Power Instinct
- White Buffalos, mascot of Madras High School in Madras, Oregon, United States

=== Music ===
==== Groups ====
- The White Buffalo (musician) (active from 2002), American
- The White Buffaloes, a rock band featuring Dave Graney

==== Songs ====
- "White Buffalo", a song by Cusco from the album Apurimac III
- "White Buffalo", a song by Running Wild from the album Pile of Skulls
- "The Great White Buffalo", a song by Saxon from the album Dogs of War
- "Great White Buffalo", a song by Ted Nugent and The Amboy Dukes from the album Tooth Fang & Claw

=== Television ===
- "Rin Tin Tin and the White Buffalo", a 1955 episode of the series The Adventures of Rin Tin Tin
- "White Buffalo", a season 9 episode of the series Walker, Texas Ranger

=== Other arts, entertainment, and media ===
- The White Buffalo (film) (1977), a film starring Charles Bronson and Jack Warden
- White Buffalo Gazette, an Obscuro Comix & Art newsletter

== Other uses ==
- White Buffalo Calf Woman, a figure in Lakota religion
- White Buffalo Cow Society, the most respected women's society amongst the Mandan and Hidatsa tribal peoples
