= S.L.H Stray Love Hearts! =

Japanese shōjo manga series

S・L・H ストレイ・ラブ・ハーツ!
- Manga
- Written by: Aya Shouoto
- Published by: MediaWorks
- Magazine: Comic Sylph
- Original run: May 2008 – July 2010
- Volumes: 5

S.L.H Stray Love Hearts! (S・L・H ストレイ・ラブ・ハーツ!) is a Japanese shōjo manga series written and illustrated by Aya Shouoto. It has been serialized in Sylph (magazine) since 2008, and has been collected in five tankōbon volumes by MediaWorks so far.

== Plot ==
On the eve of her sixteenth birthday, Kozue Hiyoki is visited in her dreams by a man who steals her heart- literally! Determined to find him and retrieve her stolen heart, Hiyoki enrolls in the S-Hall dormitories of St. Nazareth Academy, but quickly realizes that its residents are not at all like she expected... for starters, they are all guys.

== Characters ==
Hiyoki Kozue

- Voiced by: Nakahara Mai (drama CD)

Hiyoki Kozue is a new first year at St. Nazareth Academy. Hiyoki is a very kind and polite girl. She came to St. Nazareth to find the man with the platinum hair who stole her heart. She noticed that he had a tattoo of the school's crest on his chest and thought he must be at St. Nazareth. At first, without her heart, Hiyoki feels that she doesn't have the determination to do anything. The first important main character she meets is Cain Kumoide. Hiyoki accidentally bumps into him and falls to the ground. When Cain glares at her and says "There's something disturbing about you..." Hiyoki ends up passing out because of her surprise and the fact that she doesn't have a heart.
She ends up waking up, and notices that her shirt is open. A strange man appears and introduces himself as Kousetsu, the advisor of S-hall, where Hiyoki currently is. Kousetsu tells Hiyoki how he noticed that she doesn't have a heart and tells her he gave her a temporary one. He warns Hiyoki that her "new" heart is very fragile and can cause her death if it overreacts. Kousetsu then tells her that S-hall is her new dorm, but they don't have a room for Hiyoki so she will have to bunk up with a new roommate every week until they have one open for her. Kousetsu takes Hiyoki to meet her roommates and she notices they are all guys!
In Chapter 20, Hiyoki finds out her heart was never stolen in the first place. Her dream was one of the future, and it almost took place when Cain initiated the ceremony to 'steal' her heart. Her real heart was frozen with fear due to the dream, and Kousetsu had it 'wake up' with hypnosis. Later in the series she realizes that she is in love with Cain and they become lovers.
Cain Kumoide

- Voiced by: Nakamura Yuichi (drama CD)

Cain is a first year at St. Nazareth Academy. He is the President of the student council; he beat out Kitou for it. Cain lives in the famous A-hall. He is very cold and mean. But he doesn't show this to his fans; to them he is a sweet and respectful guy. Hiyoki thought he had dual personality. He takes afternoon naps and likes to tease Hiyoki about her hair, calling her "tails." His "feelings" for her are very unclear. One moment he is flirting with her and the next moment he is making fun of her. He once offered Hiyoki a room in A-Hall. Only to have Hiyoki refuse him, and later laughs in her face and tells her he was only joking. Cain has a great hatred for S-hall, and its residents. The reason why is yet unknown. When Hiyoki confronts Cain about destroying S-Hall he does not understand why she cares for S-Hall so much when she only just got there. He assumes it's because she has already got a boyfriend. He says this out loud to Hiyoki which gets him slapped. Cain has a very mysterious air around him. He shares the same ability as Hiyoki, being able to look into people's unconscious mind, their 'dreams'. He has also been mentioned to read people's thoughts and their futures. At the last chapter, he confessed his love for Hiyoki.
Ren Ichikawa

- Voiced by: Taniyama Kishou (drama CD)

Ren is a first year at St. Nazareth Academy, and lives in S-hall. He is the first guy to share his room with Hiyoki, and his room is traditional Japanese style. He is very hesitant at first about having a girl in S-hall but warms up to her later, then ends up having a crush on her. Ren is also buddies with Kuga. He dislikes Cain very much, due to something between the two boys that happened in the past. Ren also works odd jobs to pay off his tuition at St. Nazareth. While on a stay on Cain's island, it is discovered that Ren and Cain are half brothers. Ren has revealed the reason for his entering the Academy: that being someone had anonymously contacted him through means of a paper crane, with instructions to ruin Cain Kumoide. In his childhood, he was always tormented about him being the illegitimate son of the previous family head. In chapter 19, he exposed the real reason of why he went to study in St. Nazareth. He felt betrayed when Cain exiled his mother and him from the family, as Cain was the only one who had treated him with kindness.
Kuga Reizei

- Voiced by: Ono Daisuke (drama CD)

Kuga is a first year at St. Nazareth Academy, who lives in S-Hall. He is well mannered but straight forward and a bit of a romanticist (e.g making Hiyoki a frilly nightgown and calling her his Goddess of Dawn). He is also close friends with Ren. Kuga has his own band and is the lead singer. He wears a silver wig when performing, to maintain his privacy. Hiyoki first thought that Kuga had stolen her heart because of the wig he wears while singing, because the man who stole her heart had the same silver hair. Kuga is the second guy to share his room with Hiyoki, which he is very cold to her at first but later he also develops a crush on her, that being shown when Ren comes to congratulate the two for finally becoming friends and Kuga says "Congratulate us while you can...I think you will lose the urge to do so soon." Implying that Kuga knows that Ren also has a crush on her too.
Miki Uegaito

- Voiced by: Hoshi Souichiro (drama CD)

Very athletic, dark skinned, wild-child who takes things at his own pace. Miki is a second year at St. Nazareth Academy who lives in S-Hall, and is the third guy to share his room with Hiyoki. People can find him sleeping in trees or bushes. He likes nature. His hair is very wild, making him appear to have ears on his head. He seems to be afraid of Yamashina, for when he was helping Hiyoki into new room he noticed that it was Yamashina's room that she was moving into and left Hiyoki.
Minemitsu Yamashina

- Voiced by: Kamiya Hiroshi (drama CD)

Yamashina is the fourth guy to let Hiyoki stay in his room. He's a cool and collected second year that is very organized. This being shown in his room. He has arrows that are on the floor and he asks Hiyoki if she could uses them instead of walking in her own direction. He is the Treasurer of the student council. There seems to be some tension between Yamashina and Cain, because Yamashina lives in S-Hall.
Hijiri Asukai

- Voiced by: Fukuyama Jun (drama CD)

Third year at St. Nazareth Academy, who lives in S-Hall. He is the fifth guy to share his room with Hiyoki. He is very small and cute for his age, and also has a close bond with Kitou. He usually hits Kitou when he talks about girls or flirts with one. Later on, Hiyoki thinks she sees the two kissing and thinks Asukai is in love with Kitou. Hiyoki completely misunderstood. Asukai wasn't in love with Kitou after all and never kissed him, their faces were close and that was all. He didn't want Hiyoki in his room because he liked cute girl clothes and kept them in his closet. The reason is stated because it started with Kitou.
Kitou Ninomiya

- Voiced by: Sakurai Takahiro (drama CD)

Third year at St. Nazareth Academy who also lives in S-Hall. Very flirtatious and fun, who claims that picking up girls is only "Good Manners". He is also very close friends with Asukai Hijiri. In chapter 7 it was reviled that he was the previous student council president. Kitou is the last guy to share his room with Hiyoki, however it is Cain who is the last one to share a room with her.
Kousetsu Nousu

- Voiced by: Shin-ichiro Miki (drama CD)

Dorm manager of S-Hall. Currently the only person in S dorm aware of Hiyoki's situation. A sorcerer, who also possesses some of the abilities of a dream seer. He has admitted to his dream seer abilities lacking the same strength as Hiyoki and Cain's, as he can only look into other's dreams that other seers are viewing. He has recruited dream seers from the student population into S-Hall. He was also, the one behind the scheme to 'steal' Hiyoki's heart, as it was the 'key' to looking into anyone's dreams whenever he wanted. Hiyoki also witnessed a brief glimpse of his dream: a pure white scene, with him in despair with a long-haired female.
Shizuka Uryuu

- Voiced by: Ishida Akira (drama CD)

Is the Vice President of the student council and a resident of the famous A-Hall. More than just an "extremely" pretty face, he is entrusted with being the president's right-hand man.
Stella Toyonoka
Stella is the Secretary of the student council and lives in A-Hall. Viewed as the undisputed school idol, she has a bit of a domineering personality.
Ayuma Hidaka
Ayuma is also another Secretary for the student council and he also lives in A-Hall. The mood-maker. Apparently member of an idol group.

== Manga ==
Outside Japan the series is licensed by Soleil Manga in France.
