= Boy Princess =

Boy Princess may refer to:

- Mimic Royal Princess, a 2011 manga whose Japanese title translates to "Boy Princess"
- Shounen Princess: Putri Harimau Naoko, a 2014 manga whose Japanese title translates to "Boy Princess"
