= List of magazines writing about comics =

This is a list of magazines writing about comics. The primary focus of the magazines in this list is or was writing about comics for at least part of their run.

Name	Founded	Defunct	Country	Publisher	Topics	External link	Refs
Amazing Heroes	1981	1992	United States	Fantagraphics Books	A magazine about the comic book medium		
The Comics Journal	1977		United States	Fantagraphics Books	A magazine of news and criticism pertaining to comic books, comic strips and graphic novels	http://www.tcj.com/	
White Buffalo Gazette	1994	2014	United States	Buzz Buzzizyk	mostly illustrations		

== See also ==
- Anime
- Comics
- Manga
- List of manga magazines
