= Atsushi Ogasawara =

Japanese anime director (born 1976)

Atsushi Ogasawara (小笠原篤, Ogasawara Atsushi; born 1 April 1976) is a Japanese anime director from Chiba, Japan.

== Anime directed ==
- Gakuen Utopia Manabi Straight!
- Galaxy Angel A
- Galaxy Angel Z
- Panyo Panyo Di Gi Charat
- Tristia of the Deep-Blue Sea
