= Tartan Check =

Japanese manga artist

Tartan Check (たあたんちぇっく, Taatan Chekku) is a Japanese manga artist working for the company Ufotable. He is noted for the illustration of the manga version of Coyote Ragtime Show and Gakuen Utopia Manabi Straight!.
