= Mizuhito Akiyama =

Japanese writer

Mizuhito Akiyama (秋山瑞人, Akiyama Mizuhito, born 1971 in Yamanashi Prefecture) is a Seiun Award-winning author noted for his science fiction light novel series Iriya no Sora, UFO no Natsu. He graduated from Hosei University, where he had learned about writing novels in a seminar class under guidance from his teacher, Professor Mizuhito Kanehara, from whom Akiyama took his pen name "Mizuhito". In 1995, after his senior Hideyuki Furuhashi debuted as a light novel writer, Akiyama sent his own work in for the Dengeki Novel Prize. Although his application was too late for the due date, he came into the notice of the editors at MediaWorks'. His first novel, E. G. Combat, published in 1998, was followed by a number of science fiction and light novel works. Akiyama became famous for his unique storytelling in the series Iriya no Sora, UFO no Natsu.

Akiyama describes himself as being "one who always look like a hooligan", in his afterthoughts at the end of the first Iriya novel.

== Works ==
- E. G. Combat
- Kurogane Communication
- Neko no Chikyūgi, illustrated by You Shiina
- Iriya no Sora, UFO no Natsu
- Minamino Minamino
- Ore wa Missile (Winner of the Seiun Award for Best Japanese Short Story of the Year in 2003)
- Unabara no Yōjinbō
- Dragonbuster
