= Iriya no Sora, UFO no Natsu =

Japanese light novel series and its franchise

- Volume 1 cover of the light novel

イリヤの空、UFOの夏
- Genre: Drama, Romance, Science fiction
- Light novel
- Written by: Mizuhito Akiyama
- Illustrated by: Eeji Komatsu
- Published by: MediaWorks
- Imprint: Dengeki Bunko
- Original run: October 2001 – August 2003
- Volumes: 4
- Original video animation
- Directed by: Naoyuki Itō
- Produced by: Hiroaki Shibata
- Written by: Michiko Yokote
- Music by: Hiroshi Takaki
- Studio: Toei Animation
- Released: February 25, 2005 – July 29, 2005
- Runtime: 25 minutes each
- Episodes: 6
- Video game
- Developer: MediaWorks
- Publisher: MediaWorks
- Genre: Sound novel
- Platform: Nintendo DS
- Released: January 11, 2007
- Manga
- Written by: Mizuhito Akiyama
- Illustrated by: Tōko Kanno
- Published by: ASCII Media Works
- Magazine: Dengeki Maoh
- Original run: October 2007 – March 2009
- Volumes: 2
- Video game

Iriya no Sora, UFO no Natsu II
- Developer: MediaWorks
- Publisher: MediaWorks
- Genre: Sound novel
- Platform: Nintendo DS
- Released: October 25, 2007

Iriya no Sora, UFO no Natsu (イリヤの空、UFOの夏; lit. Iriya's Sky, Summer of the UFOs) is a Japanese sci-fi light novel series written by Mizuhito Akiyama with illustrations by Eeji Komatsu that centers on the relationship between Kana Iriya, a high school girl who has to fight alien invaders, and Naoyuki Asaba, a member of the school newspaper club and one of her few friends. There were four light novels published by MediaWorks under their Dengeki Bunko imprint; the series was once nominated for the Seiun Award. Later, a six-episode original video animation adaptation was created based on the novels; the DVDs were released in Japan between February 25 and July 29, 2005. Two sound novel video games for the Nintendo DS were released in Japan; the first in January 2007 and the second in October 2007. A manga series illustrated by Tōko Kanno was serialized in ASCII Media Works' seinen manga magazine Dengeki Maoh between the October 2007 and March 2009 issues.

== Plot ==
Iriya no Sora, UFO no Natsu is a story revolving around a secret war that has been going on below the public's eye since 1947 and a group of people involved in the war, either directly or indirectly. The main protagonist is a young high school student named Naoyuki Asaba who, on the last day of summer break, sneaks into the school at night to swim in secret. However, upon arrival at the pool, he meets the mysterious Kana Iriya, who is there for the same reason. However, she doesn't know how to swim, so Naoyuki offers to teach her how to swim. During this private lesson, a group of people show up in search of Kana and take her back to the nearby air force base where she is staying.

The next day, Naoyuki is surprised to find that Kana joins his class as the new term begins. Eventually, both of them take a liking to each other and Naoyuki even gets her to join the school newspaper club. Little does Naoyuki know that Kana is in fact an expert fighter pilot engaged in a war between humans and aliens that has been going on since the Kenneth Arnold incident on June 24, 1947. The whole world's fate rests in the hands of Kana Iriya and if she can ultimately hold off the invasion in the final battle.

== Characters ==
Naoyuki Asaba (浅羽 直之, Asaba Naoyuki)
Voiced by: Daisuke Namikawa (OVA), Hisayoshi Suganuma (radio drama)
The main character, Naoyuki is usually a relatively quiet boy who spends time with his close friends most of the time. His parents own a hair salon, and Naoyuki himself is able to cut hair. A member of the school newspaper club, he spent the previous summer keeping a watch out for UFOs near a local military base with the club's chairman for company. At the beginning of the school year, he meets the new transfer student, Kana Iriya, and quickly forms a crush on her. Naoyuki usually tries his best to be assertive when needed, but is also very sensitive and cries several times throughout the series.
Kana Iriya (伊里野 加奈, Iriya Kana)
Voiced by: Ai Nonaka (OVA), Ryo Hirohashi (radio drama)
Kana is a very mysterious girl who transfers into Naoyuki's class at the beginning of the school term at the end of the summer vacation. She tends to have very little social skills and rarely talks to anyone. In effect, most of her classmates dislike her rude attitude and avoid her most of the time. The truth is, however, that she is humanity's last hope at defeating alien invaders from completely annihilating the human race. To save mankind, she is forced to pilot the "Black Manta", a super advanced fighter jet with astounding maneuverability, with which she often fights the invaders. However, by flying the Black Manta, Iriya's mind and body are constantly under incredible strain causing her to often bleed frequently, especially from her nose. Soon after meeting Naoyuki at school, she quickly develops a crush on him and because of this, she joins the school newspaper club to be with him. She places various objects in his footlocker on the days that she is present at school.
Akiho Sudō (須藤 晶穂, Sudō Akiho)
Voiced by: Saeko Chiba (OVA), Satsuki Yukino (radio drama)
Akiho is one of Naoyuki's classmates and has known Asaba long enough to have developed a crush on him. At first, she dislikes Kana and excludes her from club activities, but after an eating contest where they both overeat and get sick they finally become friends.
Kunihiro Suizenji (水前寺 邦博, Suizenji Kunihiro)
Voiced by: Hiroshi Kamiya (OVA), Shinichiro Miki (radio drama)
He is the chairman of the Sonohara Wave Press otherwise known as is the school newspaper club. He is always filled with energy and is very loud because of it. He refers to the other members of the club as "Special Correspondents" and often gets very in to his work. Also, he is relatively knowledgeable about computers as once he was able to listen in on Naoyuki's and Kana's conversation when they were on a date together. In the novels, it is mentioned that he is actually quite good in both studies and sports; his record for running the 100 meter dash is eleven seconds.
Enomoto (榎本, Enomoto)
Voiced by: Kazuhiko Inoue (OVA), Yasunori Matsumoto (radio drama)
Supposedly Kana's older brother, he is an older man who is more or less in charge of Kana and is very protective of her. Usually he tends to be a very care-free type of person, though can sometimes be driven to be very violent, especially when Kana is concerned.
Mayumi Shiina (椎名 真由美, Shiina Mayumi)
Voiced by: Houko Kuwashima (OVA), Yumi Toma (radio drama)
She is Enomoto's colleague, who is also connected with protecting Kana at all costs. She impersonates the school nurse at Naoyuki's school in order to keep an eye on Kana, though she really does seem to have some knowledge about medicine. Also, she can be a very violent person and once brutally fought with Naoyuki after they had a talk about Kana. Mayumi Shiina is not her real name, which remains unknown; the initials of her true name, as seen in her letter to Naoyuki, is "T.S.".
Yūko Asaba (浅羽 夕子, Asaba Yūko)
Voiced by: Naoko Takano (OVA)
Naoyuki's younger sister who is in junior high school. She tends to be very loud and annoying to her older brother and does not back down easily. When Naoyuki went on a date with Kana, Yūko ended up following and spying on them, which is probably because she was interested in finding out who Kana was. After the spying, she got into a fight with Suizenji.
Yuuji Hanamura (花村 祐二, Hanamura Yūji)
Voiced by: Hirofumi Tanaka (OVA)
Naoyuki's classmate, who often hangs out with him.
Taizou Kawaguchi (河口 泰蔵, Kawaguchi Taizou)
Voiced by: Masaya Takatsuka (OVA)
Naoyuki's homeroom teacher.

== Media ==
=== Light novels ===
The light novel series of Iriya no Sora is written by Japanese author Mizuhito Akiyama and illustrated by Eeji Komatsu, also known for his work on Planetarian: The Reverie of a Little Planet. The series was four volumes in length and published by MediaWorks under their Dengeki Bunko label. Eventually, the series was nominated for the Seiun Award. The Chinese translation is published by Kadokawa Media.

==== List of chapters ====
Volume 1

- Close Encounter of the Third Kind
- Love Letter
- Secrets to Stealing A Scooter, Part 1
- Omake: Because It Is So (a chapter focused on Mayumi Shiina)

Volume 2

- Secrets to Stealing A Scooter, Part 2
- 18:47'32", Part 1
- 18:47'32", Part 2
- Omake: Let's Wash the Corpse

Volume 3

- The Penniless Food Chronicles
- Suizenji, Answer Me, Part 1
- Suizenji, Answer Me, Part 2
- Omake: Winter of ESP

Volume 4

- Summer Holidays Revisited, Part 1
- Summer Holidays Revisited, Part 2
- The Last Road
- The Southern Island
- Epilogue

=== Original video animation ===
A six-episode original video animation series based on the novels was produced by the animation studio Toei Animation. The OVAs were released as six DVDs between February 25 and July 29, 2005. Five of the DVD titles are taken from the chapter titles of the novels. The OVA's opening theme was "Forever Blue" and the ending theme was "Himawari", both sung by Chihiro Imai.

==== Episodes ====
No.	Title	Original sale date
1	"Close Encounter of the Third Kind"; Transliteration: "Daisanshu Sekkin Sōgū" (Japanese: 第三種接近遭遇)	February 25, 2005
On the last day of summer vacation, Naoyuki goes to school for intending to swim after his forty-day long trip with Kunihiro investigating the Sonohara base. At the school pool, he meets Iriya who in equal surprise falls into the shallow pool, thinking that she is drowning. Saving her and treating her subsequent nose bleed, he begins to teach her how to swim. He discovers silver circular caps on her wrists that she says taste like electricity. A military siren interrupts them, and Enomoto appears, telling Naoyuki to leave first. Passing through the military blockade, he receives a bug planted in the upper-right part of his neck. The next day, he Iriya appears at school as a transfer student. After the opening ceremony, an air raid drill alarm sounds, causing Iriya to take Naoyuki and run into the secured shelter under the impression that a real air raid was about to occur. Inside, after losing a game, Iriya collapses. While trying to treat her, he is caught in an awkward position when Shiina and some other open the shelter.
2	"Love Letter"; Transliteration: "Rabu Retā" (Japanese: ラブレター)	March 25, 2005
Kunihiro orders Naoyuki to have a date with Iriya. On Saturday, Iriya waits for him for four hours before the meeting time of 10:00. They go to see the movie which begins at 10:30 where Iriya falls asleep, followed by both Kunihiro with Yūko and Enomoto with his assistant. Noticing that they have tapped his listening device placed in Naoyuki's wallet, Kunihiro manages to catch a picture of Enomoto and his assistant as they flee after being discovered. The commotion causes Iriya to take Naoyuki and run. Disposing of the Kunihiro's bug, they continue to be chased by Kunihiro and Yūko, under the impression they are enemies. However once they manage to ditch the two, they stop by a park where Iriya recounts a tale of herself and four others at the Nevada base when the group decided to investigate the crash site of one of the group. The next day, Naoyuki finds her application for the newspaper club in his footlocker.
3	"18:47'32""; Transliteration: "Jūhachiji Yonjūnanafun Sanjūnibyō" (Japanese: 十八時四十七分三十二秒)	April 29, 2005
The newspaper club prepares a painted wooden model of the Sonohara base with a UFO hovering over it for the school festival. Before a new mission, Naoyuki asks Iriya what she would like to do for the school who then replies that she would like to do whatever Naoyuki is doing. Enomoto asks Naoyuki to promise to perform the folk dance with Iriya. On the second day of the school festival, the day of the folk dance, Iriya calls Naoyuki on the school phone, telling him to come to the Rokuban-yama Hill at the Self-Defense Force's old practice grounds at 18:45. There Iriya dances with him from her Black Manta.
4	"Suizenji, Answer Me"; Transliteration: "Suizenji Ōtō Seyo" (Japanese: 水前寺 応答せよ)	June 3, 2005
Kunihiro leaves to investigate a large fire that erupts in the Sonohara base at night, leaving signs of his departure. The next day, Akiho challenges Iriya to gather information for the newspaper club so as not to be a burden to Naoyuki just before she makes daily call to Enomoto. Followed by a group of four friends including Naoyuki, they soon began food-eating competition as a symbolic competition of their love for Naoyuki, concluding with a three course meal of massive quantity called the Strong Man's Set Meal (鉄人定食, Tetsujin Teishoku). Resting after their battle at Akiho's house, they become friends when Enomoto arrives, angry for not being contacted at noon. She returns to school the next day with her hair platinum-blonde and extremely frail. Her vision begins to fail, and in the clocktower of the school, she begins to fountain blood from her mouth; Shiina saves her by sticking five syringes into her body. After finding out that she keeps his things as a charm, he vocalizes his doubts about Iriya's situation, earning him a beating from Shiina. After recovering from his bruises, he decides with Iriya to run away from Enomoto. After removing the bug placed in the right side of his neck, they began their escape.
5	"The Last Road"; Transliteration: "Saigo no Michi" (Japanese: 最後の道)	June 24, 2005
After two days of fleeing south, Iriya and Naoyuki find shelter in the Narimasu Elementary School (成増小学校, Narimasu Shōgakkō) where Iriya decides to adopt a cat who she names Kōchō (校長). The next day, while Naoyuki is heading over to a convenience store to buy food and supplies, a ragged man goes to Narimasu Elementary after hearing of a rumour of white haired girl there at appearing night from workers at the same convenience store. Iriya fends him off failing to kill him, slashing his leg before he violates her, causing him to faint due to blood loss as he calls the police. As they run away in the rain, Naoyuki breaks from stress and orders Iriya to never show her face in front of him again. From the shock, Iriya slashes him and breaks. She loses her sense of the present and begins associating Naoyuki's face with that of different people that she has met. In order to take care of her, he decides to take her to his grandparents place. Due to her deluded state, Naoyuki finds out about her feelings for him, after which, she collapses. Bringing her to his grandparents place, he finds Enomoto waiting for him.
6	"Iriya's Sky, Summer of the UFOs"; Transliteration: "Iriya no Sora, UFO no Natsu" (Japanese: イリヤの空、UFOの夏)	July 29, 2005
Enomoto takes Iriya back and treats her illness. Over a dinner of green ramen, Enomoto tells Naoyuki about the situation surrounding the secret war and Iriya's involvement in that war, announcing that the final battle takes place in three days, on October 26. During those three days, Naoyuki returns to his original home, spending all his time after school shut in his room staring at his clock. Because Iriya refuses to sortie, Enomoto sends a helicopter over to pick Naoyuki up shortly after school begins. Naoyuki manages to ease Iriya's insecurities and fears caused by his order to never appear again after confessing his own feelings for her, giving Iriya the resolve to continue to fight, despite Naoyuki's desires for the contrary. In the epilogue, Shiina writes Naoyuki a letter describing the many hardships that Iriya had to go through up until she met Naoyuki and then the military's involvement past that time. Kunihiro also returns from his investigation of the Sonohara base, though without his memory of the secrets of the Sonohara base. The episodes finishes with Naoyuki cutting a Mysterious Circle into the grass field.

=== Video games ===
A sound novel and card game video game for the Nintendo DS based on the series was released in Japan on January 11, 2007, by MediaWorks. A sequel named Iriya no Sora, UFO no Natsu II was released on October 25, 2007. On the same day the second game came out, a bundle pack containing the two games went on sale.

=== Manga ===
A manga adaptation for the series was serialized in ASCII Media Works' seinen manga magazine Dengeki Maoh between the October 2007 and March 2009 issues. Two tankōbon volume of the manga were released between June 27, 2008, and April 27, 2009, under ASCII Media Works' Dengeki Comics imprint. The manga's artist, Tōko Kanno, is also the artist of the manga adaptation of Oku-sama wa Mahō Shōjo: Bewitched Agnes.
