= Mimic Royal Princess =

Japanese manga series

- Volume 1 cover art

少年王女 (Shōnen Ōjo)
- Genre: Fantasy
- Manga
- Written by: Utako Yukihiro; Zenko Musashino
- Illustrated by: Utako Yukihiro
- Published by: ASCII Media Works
- Imprint: Sylph Comics
- Magazine: Sylph (2011–2013); Comic It (2015–2018)
- Original run: January 22, 2011 – February 15, 2018 (on hiatus)
- Volumes: 5
- Audio drama
- Original run: January 27, 2017 – March 27, 2017
- Episodes: 2

Mimic Royal Princess, known in Japan as Shōnen Ōjo (Japanese: 少年王女; "Boy Princess"), is a fantasy manga series written and illustrated by Utako Yukihiro based on an original concept by Zenko Musashino. It premiered in ASCII Media Works' magazine Sylph on January 22, 2011, and was transferred to Comic It in 2015, allowing Yukihiro more freedom of expression due to its older target audience. Comic It ceased publication in 2018, and the series has since been on hiatus.

The story follows Albert, a young man who, because of how similar he looks to Crown Princess Alexia, must dress like a woman and serve as her body double. The series was well received by critics, who liked its setting, cast of characters, and artwork, and found it unexpectedly complex and believable for a story about cross-dressing. In addition to the manga, a two-volume Mimic Royal Princess audio drama was released in 2017.

== Premise ==
Mimic Royal Princess is set in a queendom in a fantasy world, where women rule and where free men only have little higher social standing than slaves. It follows Albert, a young man living by the port, who together with his friend is kidnapped by a slave trader and sold to Crown Princess Alexia. He is taken to the royal palace, where he because of how he looks nearly identical to Alexia is forced to wear women's clothes and serve as her body double.

== Production and release ==
Mimic Royal Princess is written and illustrated by Utako Yukihiro, based on an original concept by Zenko Musashino. Yukihiro draws the series digitally, and tried to design her characters with both elegance and broad appeal in mind, making use of flower motifs, lace, dresses, and princely clothing. The series began publication in Japan in ASCII Media Works' magazine Sylph on January 22, 2011, in its March 2011 issue.

The series was put on hiatus in April 2013; when ASCII Media Works launched their monthly magazine Comic It on February 14, 2015, the series was transferred to it, and continued serialization there starting with its first issue. Yukihiro had wanted the move due to Comic It's older target audience of women in their 20s and 30s, as it enabled a greater freedom of expression: she could now depict sexuality and differences between men and women in a way that had been impossible during the Sylph serialization. Comic It ceased publication with its 25th issue on February 15, 2018; Yukihiro wrote in December 2018 that there were difficulties in continuing the series, but that she hoped to be able to break its hiatus.

ASCII Media Works collected the series in five tankōbon volumes starting on September 22, 2011, published under the Sylph Comics imprint; three further chapters have been released but not collected in volumes. The volumes have been published in German by Carlsen Verlag since 2014 and in French by Bamboo Édition under their imprint Doki-Doki since 2015. An audio drama based on the series was released in two volumes on January 27 and March 27, 2017, with cover art by Yukihiro. The drama stars Natsuki Hanae as Albert, Takahiro Sakurai as Guy, Takuma Terashima as Theodore, and Daisuke Hirakawa as Olivier. The series has also seen merchandise, including an acrylic keychain designed by Yukihiro, acrylic stands, pins, and art prints.

=== Volumes ===
No.	Release date	ISBN
1	September 22, 2011	978-4-04-870966-8
Chapter 1–7
2	August 22, 2012	978-4-04-886715-3
Chapter 8–14
3	August 22, 2013	978-4-04-891861-9
Chapter 15–19
4	November 21, 2015	978-4-04-865478-4
Chapter 20–25
5	August 22, 2016	978-4-04-892298-2
Chapter 26–31

== Reception ==
Mimic Royal Princess was critically well received. Critics called the series better and more complex than one might expect, being more than just a series about cross-dressing; Manga-News wrote that one could have thought that it would only be a comedic cross-dressing story, but that although it has elements of it with an initially lighthearted atmosphere, the story turns darker as it focuses on the royal family, inequality, and social status.

The main character was well received; Manga Sanctuary appreciated how Albert needs to undergo hard training to become a woman and does not instantly pass as the princess when he starts wearing women's clothes, which they thought made the series more believable than cross-dressing stories often are. They liked the series' core cast of characters, describing them as having depth and personality, with interesting interactions between them, such as Albert and Alexia's growing friendship, although considered the secondary characters weaker. Natalie liked getting to follow an ordinary and helpless male character go through dramatic changes, and recommended the series particularly to female readers who enjoy that in a story.

Critics liked the series' setting and considered it well thought out and immersive, with an established history and society. Yukihiro's artwork was praised, especially the environments for their detail and rendering; Manga Sanctuary said that although the style was not the most original, they found the visuals "superb". The presentation and layout were likewise positively received, considered an easy and smooth reading experience.
