= Sylph (magazine) =

Japanese manga magazine

- Cover of the first issue of Sylph featuring characters from Majina!. Illustration by J-ta Yamada.
- Categories: Shōjo manga
- Frequency: Monthly
- Publisher: ASCII Media Works
- First issue: December 9, 2006
- Final issue: July 22, 2017
- Country: Japan
- Language: Japanese
- Website: Sylph

Sylph (シルフ, Shirufu) is a Japanese shōjo manga magazine published by ASCII Media Works (formerly MediaWorks) which was sold monthly. The magazine was originally published on December 9, 2006, with the tagline "Aim for the 'cute and cool' style! A new kind of Shojo manga magazine" as a special edition version of MediaWorks' now-defunct Dengeki Comic Gao! under the title Comic Sylph (コミックシルフ, Komikku Shirufu; normally written as comic SYLPH) as a quarterly publication. On March 21, 2008, with the release of the sixth volume, the magazine was transferred over as a special edition version of ASCII Media Works' magazine Dengeki Daioh.

On May 22, 2008, the magazine became independent of Dengeki Daioh and was published as volume one of Sylph as the July 2008 issue as a bimonthly publication. On May 22, 2010, the magazine started to be published monthly. In 2017, the magazine became digital-only when it re-launched as "Sylph Pixiv". Sylph is one of the few magazines originally published by MediaWorks not under the Dengeki naming line, such as with Dengeki Daioh, and Dengeki G's Magazine, the first of which being Active Japan in 1995 which has been discontinued since 1998.

== Serialized titles ==
- Arcana Famiglia
- Brothers Conflict (novel series) by Udajo, Takeshi Mizuno, and Atsuko Kanase (2010–2012)
- Brothers Conflict Puru puru (manga) by Takeshi Mizuno and Deathco Cotorino (2012–2013)
- Durarara!! 3 Way Standoff - Alley by Izuko Fujiya and Ryougo Narita (2013–2014)
- Hakase ga!! by Eri Sakondo (2010–2015, then transferred to Comic it 2015-cancelled)
- Hakuouki by Naki Hiraku (2010–2011)
- Lillia and Treize
- Magic-kyun Renaissance
- S.L.H Stray Love Hearts! by Aya Shouoto
- Shōnen Ōjo by Utako Yukihiro (2011–2015, then transferred to Comic it from 2015 to 2018)
- Uta no Prince-sama Debut

== Special edition ==
Dengeki Daioh Genesis
Dengeki Daioh Genesis (電撃大王GENESIS) was a shōnen and seinen manga magazine featuring only original manga and was first published on January 19, 2010, as a special edition of Dengeki Maoh. The magazine became a special edition of Sylph with the third volume in July 2010. Originally a quarterly, the magazine became a bimonthly publication in July 2011 until its final issue in November 2012.
