= Dengeki Hime =

Japanese visual novel magazine

- Cover of the August 2007 issue of Dengeki Hime featuring Komari Kamikita, one of the heroines from Little Busters!. Illustration by Itaru Hinoue.
- Categories: Eroge, Visual novels
- Frequency: Monthly
- Founded: 1997
- Final issue: December 27, 2014
- Company: ASCII Media Works
- Country: Japan
- Based in: Tokyo
- Language: Japanese
- Website: Dengeki Hime

Dengeki Hime (電撃姫) was a Japanese magazine published monthly by ASCII Media Works (formerly MediaWorks) publishing information mainly on adult visual novels. The magazine started as a special issue of the now discontinued Dengeki Oh in 1997, and in 2001 it became its own entity. Originally, it held information on boys love series but eventually shifted to adult visual novels when Dengeki Girl's Style began hosting the former content. Its sister magazine is Dengeki G's Magazine which publishes similar information of visual novels. Starting in the April 2007 issue, the title of the magazine was written in all capitals.

The magazine was discontinued on December 27, 2014. The magazine's official website ceased operation on April 2, 2018, which was announced on Twitter, as well as for a brief period of time on the website itself.

== Reader participation projects ==
- Maid in Dream, ran between volume 7 and December 2003
- Ocha Para Ocha no Mizu Onago Gakuen, ran between April 2001 and May 2005
- Master of Witches: Gekidō!! Mahō Gakuen, ran between June 2004 and August 2005
- G Baku-chan, ran between October 2004 and July 2006
- Colorfull Education, started December 2005
- Kimi ni Okuru Boku no Uta, started December 2005
