= Dengeki Nintendo =

Japanese gaming magazine

- Cover of the October 2024 issue, featuring Splatoon 3
- Categories: Video Games, Nintendo
- Frequency: Monthly
- Format: A4
- Publisher: MediaWorks (1992–2008); ASCII Media Works (2008–present)
- First issue: December 26, 1992; 33 years ago
- Country: Japan
- Language: Japanese
- Website: dn.dengeki.com

Dengeki Nintendo (Japanese: 電撃Nintendo) (lit. "Nintendo Shock") is a Japanese gaming magazine published by ASCII Media Works (formerly MediaWorks). The magazine mainly covers information pertaining Nintendo games and consoles.

== History and profile ==
The magazine was originally named Dengeki Super Famicom and first went on sale on December 26, 1992. When the Nintendo 64 was released, the magazine's name was altered to Dengeki Nintendo 64 in 1996. This was again changed in 2001 when it was changed to Dengeki GB Advance to reflect the launch of the Game Boy Advance. In 2002, it was renamed to Dengeki GameCube and again to Dengeki Nintendo DS in April 2006. Starting with the May 2012 issue, the magazine was retitled to Dengeki Nintendo for Kids, and was renamed to its current title Dengeki Nintendo with the June 2013 issue.

== Special editions ==
Dengeki Games
Dengeki Games was a special edition version of Dengeki Nintendo DS which was first published on October 13, 2006 under the title Dengeki DS Style, but the title was changed to Dengeki DS & Wii Style on April 13, 2007 with the third volume. The title again changed after a renewal of the magazine on July 4, 2008 to Dengeki DS & Wii and finally to Dengeki Games on September 25, 2009 until its final publication on May 26, 2011. The magazine primarily covered information pertaining to the Nintendo DS and Wii video game consoles. The magazine was sold monthly.

Character Parfait
Character Parfait was the second special edition version of Dengeki Nintendo DS which was first published on December 15, 2006. The magazine became independent with the publication of volume ten on December 1, 2009. The magazine is intended for young girls in elementary school and serializes manga intended for the same audience. The magazine is published bimonthly and primarily contains information on games for the Nintendo DS and Wii intended for young girls.
