= Dengeki Hobby Magazine =

Japanese hobby magazine

- May 2007 issue.
- Categories: Plastic models, toys
- Frequency: Monthly
- Publisher: ASCII Media Works
- First issue: 25 November 1998 (January 1999 issue)
- Final issue: 25 May 2015 (July 2015 issue)
- Country: Japan
- Based in: Tokyo
- Language: Japanese
- Website: Dengeki Hobby Magazine

Dengeki Hobby Magazine (電撃ホビーマガジン, Dengeki Hobī Magajin) was a Japanese magazine under the Dengeki Hobby brand published by ASCII Media Works (formerly MediaWorks) centering on information relating to plastic models and toys. It first went on sale on 25 November 1998. There was a Chinese version published by Ching Win Publishing, Taiwan.

On 14 December 2007, "Super Modelers," a model store in Akihabara that was produced by this magazine with the participation of Arclight, Wave, Chara-Ani, and Media Works, opened, but closed less than two years later.

On 21 May 2015 it was announced that the magazine would end its print publication with the July 2015 issue, shifting to an online presence as Dengeki Hobby Web.

== Published articles ==
- Armored Core Retribution
- Advance of Z Titans no Hata no Motoni
- Busō Shinki o Asobitsukuse! Shinki Kore Machi
- Capsule-toy vending machine Gundam Getters
- Dengeki Hobby Brive Generation (related to the Brave series)
- Dengeki Hobby Otomegumi
- Dengeki Hobby Satellite
- Dengeki Hobby Yōgo Jiten
- Dengeki Robot Museum
- Dengeki Tokusatsu Tsūshin Plus
- G.T.R. (Gundam Terminal Report)
- Gekkan All That Zoids
- Hagane no Kon
- Kanzen Shōri Daiteiō
- Macross The Ride
- MM Box (reader corner)
- Mobile Suit Gundam SEED Astray B
- Mobile Suit Gundam SEED C.E. 73: Stargazer Phantom Pain Report
- Mobile Suit Gundam SEED Destiny Astray
- Negima! 3D (figure corner)
- Puha Plastic Model no Pu
- Reader's Works
- Ryōhei Odai no Nanda? My Mission
- Sukusuku Scratch
- Super Robot Taisen: Original Generation
- Super Robot Wars Superstation
- Ultraman in the Real: Nichijō no Naka no Ultraman
- Valvrave the Liberator: Undertaker
- Virtual On Fragmentary Passage
