= White Buffalo Gazette =

- Former editors: Max Traffic (originating editor), Ed Bolman, Jeff Zenick, Larned Justin
- Categories: Underground comix, art
- Frequency: Monthly
- Format: 22 cm (8.7 in)
- Publisher: Buzz Buzzizyk
- First issue: 1994; 32 years ago
- Final issue: Spring 2014; 12 years ago
- Country: United States
- Based in: Butler, PA
- Language: English
- OCLC: 50134063

The White Buffalo Gazette (WBG) is a newsletter/zine that covered the "Obscuro Comix & Art." The WBG took the place of Steve Willis' City Limits Gazette (1991–1993) when that publication was retired. WBG was originally inspired by Bruce Chrislip's zine of the same name, as well as Clay Geerdes' Comix World newsletter. Unlike City Limits Gazette or Comix World, which were primarily networking and review publications, WBG was chiefly illustrative in nature.

== Publication history ==
WBG was originally published by Butler, Pennsylvania, artist Maximum Traffic, but over the years was issued on an irregular basis by others, including Edward Bolman and Cat Noel (from November 1996 through December 1998), Jeff Zenick, Delaine Derry, and Geoff Hamerlinck.

Steve Skeates also published one issue of The White Buffalo Bootleg (November or December 1997) while Carol Pond published The Stick Buffalo Gazette (January 1998).

The final issue of the White Buffalo Gazette was published in Spring 2014.

== Issues ==
The White Buffalo Gazette issues
Issue	Release date	Publisher	City of origin
	1998 June	Catherine Noel	Prescott, AZ
	1998 August / September	Larned Justin	House Springs, MO
	1999 January	Jeff Zenick	Tallahassee, FL
	1999 February	Jeff Zenick	Tallahassee, FL
	1999 March	Jeff Zenick	Tallahassee, FL
	2001 January	Jeff Zenick	Tallahassee, FL
	2001 February	Larned Justin	House Springs, MO
	2001 March	Larned Justin	House Springs, MO
	2001 May	Larned Justin	House Springs, MO
	2002 April	Buzz Buzzizyk	Butler, PA
	2002 May	Buzz Buzzizyk	Butler, PA
	2002 June		
	2002 July	Elmore Buzzizyk	Butler, PA
	2002 August		
	2002 September	Buzz Buzzizyk	Butler, PA
	2002 October	Buzz Buzzizyk	Butler, PA
	2002 November		
	2002 December		
	2003 January	Buzz Buzzizyk	Butler, PA
	2014 Spring	Buzz Buzzizyk	Butler, PA
