= Dengeki Maoh =

Japanese manga magazine

- Cover of the May 2007 issue of Dengeki Maoh.
- Categories: Seinen manga, light novels, video games
- Frequency: Monthly
- Publisher: MediaWorks (2005-2008); ASCII Media Works (2008-present)
- First issue: October 27, 2005
- Country: Japan
- Based in: Tokyo
- Language: Japanese
- Website: Dengeki Maoh

Dengeki Maoh (電撃マオウ, Dengeki Maō) is a Japanese seinen magazine published by ASCII Media Works (formerly MediaWorks). It first went on sale on October 27, 2005, and is sold every month on the twenty-seventh. The magazine features information on video games, manga, and light novels. A special edition version of the magazine called Dengeki Black Maoh was published quarterly from September 2007 to June 2010.

== Series serialized ==
=== In Dengeki Maoh ===
- A Tropical Fish Yearns for Snow
- Aruite Ippo!!
- Black Bullet
- Bokusatsu Tenshi Dokuro-chan
- Butareba: The Story of a Man Turned into a Pig (ongoing)
- Detectives These Days Are Crazy! (ongoing)
- Disgaea 2: Cursed Memories
- Enburio
- eM -eNCHANTarM-
- Furatto Rain
- Girl Friend BETA
- GT-giRl (ongoing)
- Himekami no Miko
- Hollow Regalia
- Immortal Grand Prix
- Iriya no Sora, UFO no Natsu
- Itsudemo Jakusansei
- KanColle: Shimakaze Compilation
- Lotte no Omocha!
- Persona 4
- Prince of Stride Galaxy Rush (ongoing)
- Rebuild World (ongoing)
- Rumble Roses
- Rune Factory 2
- Seiyū Radio no Ura Omote
- Spice and Wolf
- Sword Art Online: Hollow Realization
- Tales of the Abyss
- Tenshō Gakuen Gekkō Roku
- The Foolish Angel Dances with the Devil (ongoing)
- The Idolmaster Colorful Days
- The Magical Revolution of the Reincarnated Princess and the Genius Young Lady
- This Art Club Has a Problem! (ongoing)
- Touring After the Apocalypse (ongoing)
- Utawarerumono
- Zatsu Tabi: That's Journey (ongoing)

=== In Dengeki Black Maoh ===
- 100Yen Shop Kiandou
- Femme Fatale
- Hanjyuku Tencho
- Heavy Object
- Ichigeki Sacchu!! HoiHoi-san Legacy (ongoing)
- Kagaminochou no Kaguya
- Karakasa no Saien
- Kizuato
- Nanatsusa
- Persona 3
- Persona 3 - Portable Dengeki Comic Anthology
- Persona 4
- Queen's Blade Struggle (ongoing)
- Sukoshi Fushigi Manga Koto-chan
- Tama Biyori
- Tama Hiyo
- Tokubetsuyomikiri - Mirukashi
- Tokubetsuyomikiri - The Writing of Secret Minds
- Yamanko

== Special edition version ==
Dengeki Black Maoh first issue.

Dengeki Black Maoh
Dengeki Black Maoh (電撃黒(ブラック)王 (Note: The title was spelled with a katakana マ on the official website, however the magazine cover used a ryakuji character of 魔 not found in Unicode for maō (魔王). See also the corresponding entry on Wiktionary)) was a Japanese seinen manga magazine published by ASCII Media Works. It was a special edition version of Dengeki Maoh that was published quarterly from September 19, 2007, and June 19, 2010.
