= List of discontinued magazines published by MediaWorks =

This is a list of discontinued magazines that were published by the Japanese publishing company MediaWorks. Most of their magazines center around anime, manga, bishōjo games, or video games. The vast majority of MediaWorks' magazines carry the title Dengeki (電撃, meaning electric shock) which precedes the title of a given magazine; the Dengeki label is also used on publishing labels, and contests held by the company, making it a well-known trademark for MediaWorks.

== Magazines ==
=== Active Japan ===
Active Japan (アクティブ・ジャパン, Akutibu Japan) was a Japanese sports magazine published by MediaWorks. It ran between March 1995 and September 1998. The magazine featured information relating to disabled sports.

=== Dengeki Adventures ===
Dengeki Adventures (電撃アドベンチャーズ, Dengeki Adobenchāzu) was a Japanese gaming magazine published by MediaWorks that featured content relating to tabletop role-playing games. It started its run in January 1994 and ended in June 1998, containing twenty-seven issues. The magazine also serialized some light novels.

==== Featured content ====
Tabletop RPGs

- Āsudōn
- Fortune Quest
- Kurisutania
- Misutara Mokushiroku
- Ōkahōushin

Comics

- Maraya
- Ōkahōushin

Light novels

- Jaja Hime Buyūden
- Kyōkagaku Hunter Rei
- A Little Dragon
- Mōryūsen Senki Madara
- Yaminabe no Inbō
- Yōhei Densetsu

=== Dengeki AniMaga ===
Dengeki AniMaga (電撃アニマガ) was a Japanese anime magazine published by MediaWorks. The magazine started its run in April 1999 when it was entitled Dengeki Animation Magazine. In August 2002, the name was changed to Dengeki AniMaga. The magazine was succeeded by Dengeki G's Magazine in 2005 when the last issue of Dengeki AniMaga was published. The magazine had nineteen issues along with two "Best Issues" that ended the magazine's run.

==== Magazine covers ====
1. Pita-Ten
2. Sister Princess Re Pure
3. Sister Princess Re Pure
4. Stellvia of the Universe
5. Happy Lesson Advance
6. Maburaho
7. D.C.: Da Capo
8. Kimi ga Nozomu Eien
9. Gunslinger Girl
10. Please Twins!
11. DearS
12. Fafner of the Azure
13. ToHeart: Remember My Memories
14. Futakoi
15. Negima!: Magister Negi Magi
16. Starship Operators
17. Futakoi Alternative
18. Strawberry Marshmallow
19. D.C.S.S.: Da Capo Second Season
20. To Heart 2
21. Shakugan no Shana

=== Dengeki Comic Gao! ===
Monthly Dengeki Comic Gao! (月刊電撃コミックガオ!, Gekkan Dengeki Komikku Gao!) was a Japanese shōnen manga magazine featuring bishōjo characters which was published between December 1992 and February 2008 by MediaWorks and contained bishōjo manga and information about those series. The Gao in the magazine's title is a childish form of the sound Grr. Many manga serialized in Dengeki Comic Gao! were adapted from light novels published under MediaWorks' Dengeki Bunko label. The magazine was sold every month on the twenty-seventh.

When Dengeki Comic Gao! was first published, many of the manga that ran in the magazine had transferred from Kadokawa Shoten's Comic Comp magazine, though many of the titles were slightly altered. This caused the readers of Comic Comp to become interested in Dengeki Comic Gao! and in October 1994, Comic Comp ceased publication. Gradually, it became apparent that MediaWorks' similar manga magazine Dengeki Daioh was much more popular, and in response, Dengeki Comic Gao! was reformatted starting with the February 2007 issue on December 27, 2006. This was also when the Gao as printed on the magazine cover was changed from being spelled in katakana (ガオ) to being spelled in English stylized as gao. On December 9, 2006, the first issue of a special edition version of Dengeki Comic Gao! called Comic Sylph was published, and is sold quarterly.

=== Dengeki Dreamcast ===
Dengeki Dreamcast (電撃Dreamcast) was a Japanese gaming magazine published by MediaWorks that featured content pertaining to the Dreamcast consumer console. The magazine was originally entitled Dengeki Mega Drive and first went on sale in January 1993. In 1996, the magazine was renamed to Dengeki Sega EX and then was renamed again in 1997 to Dengeki Sega Saturn. In 1998, the magazine changed its name for the final time, ending with Dengeki Dreamcast and was discontinued in 2000.

Dengeki hp volume 47.

=== Dengeki hp ===
Dengeki hp (電撃hp) was a Japanese seinen magazine published by MediaWorks centered on publishing light novels. The first issue was released on December 18, 1998, and for the first eight issues was published quarterly; after this, it was being published bimonthly. The magazine was discontinued with its fiftieth release in October 2007, and was succeeded by Dengeki Bunko Magazine, a special edition version of Dengeki Daioh.

=== Dengeki Oh ===
Dengeki Oh (電撃王, Dengeki Ō) was a Japanese gaming magazine published monthly by MediaWorks featuring information mainly on video games. The magazine first went on sale on January 8, 1993. As of December 1, 2006, the magazine has been discontinued.

=== Dengeki Shōnen ===
Dengeki Shōnen (電撃少年) was a Japanese shōnen gaming magazine published by MediaWorks. It ran between September 1994 and September 1996, containing fourteen issues.
