= Dengeki PlayStation =

Japanese video game magazine

- Cover of the last issue (May 2020) featuring Cloud Strife of Final Fantasy VII Remake
- Founded: 1994
- First issue: December 1994; 31 years ago
- Final issue: May 2020; 6 years ago
- Company: MediaWorks (1994–2008); ASCII Media Works (2008–2022)
- Country: Japan
- Based in: Tokyo
- Language: Japanese
- Website: dengekionline.com/dps/

Dengeki PlayStation (Japanese: 電撃 PlayStation) was a Japanese video gaming publication by ASCII Media Works (formerly MediaWorks). It primarily features information pertaining to the PlayStation brand. Dengeki PlayStation was originally founded as a magazine in 1994 and ran until 2020, when it ceased production and went fully digital as Dengeki Online.

== History ==
The magazine first went on sale in December 1994 as a special edition version of Dengeki G's Magazine.

It ceased publication on March 28, 2020, with issue No. 686, its cover featuring Cloud Strife on covering Final Fantasy VII Remake. The decision was made due to changes "surrounding media such as magazines, as well as changes in the delivery of game information." The publication still exists digitally through the Dengeki Online website.

== Special edition versions ==
Dengeki Girl's Style May 2007 issue

Dengeki PS2
Dengeki PS2 was a special edition version of Dengeki PlayStation that was published about three or four times a year in irregular intervals. It was first published on January 22, 1997 under the title Dengeki PlayStation D, and was changed to the current title in September 2001 until its final issue on February 15, 2008. The magazine mainly featured information on the PlayStation 2, but also carried information about games for the PlayStation 3 and PlayStation Portable as well.

Dengeki PSP
Dengeki PSP was another special edition version of Dengeki PlayStation that, like Dengeki PS2 was published only a few times a year and in irregular intervals. The magazine mainly features information on the PlayStation Portable, and was published between December 3, 2004 and October 21, 2011.

Dengeki Girl's Style
Dengeki Girl's Style (電撃 Girl's Style) was the third special edition version of Dengeki PlayStation. It was first published under the title Dengeki PlayStation Girl's Style on December 4, 2003, but the title dropped the PlayStation in early 2007. The magazine was originally sold quarterly, but switched to a bimonthly publication on April 10, 2007, and became an independent magazine. The magazine began to be published monthly on April 10, 2012. The magazine mainly features information on otome and boy's love games, but also carries information on anime and manga geared towards a female audience. A special edition version titled Dengeki Girl's Style BL Version specifically covers information on shōnen-ai otome games and was first sold on June 30, 2008.

Dengeki Online D
Dengeki Online D was the fourth special edition version of Dengeki PlayStation which was first published between August 31 and December 21, 2007. The magazine covered online-capable video games for many different platforms, such as Final Fantasy XI and Monster Hunter Frontier, which were featured in the first issue.
