= ASCII Media Works =

Japanese publishing company

- Native name: アスキー・メディアワークス
- Romanized name: Asukī Media Wākusu
- Type: Division
- Industry: Publishing
- Predecessor: ASCII Corporation; MediaWorks
- Founded: April 1, 2008; 18 years ago
- Headquarters: Fujimi, Chiyoda, Tokyo, Japan
- Products: Books, magazines, manga
- Revenue: ¥493,500,000 (2013)
- Number of employees: 364
- Parent: Kadokawa Key-Process
- Subsidiaries: Dengeki Bunko

ASCII Media Works (アスキー・メディアワークス, Asukī Media Wākusu), formerly ASCII Media Works, Inc. (株式会社アスキー・メディアワークス, Kabushiki gaisha Asukī Media Wākusu), is a Japanese publisher and brand company of Kadokawa Future Publishing headquartered in Nishi-Shinjuku, Shinjuku, Tokyo, Japan. It originally formed on April 1, 2008, as a result of a merger between ASCII Corporation and MediaWorks where MediaWorks legally absorbed ASCII. Despite this, the former president and CEO of ASCII, Kiyoshi Takano, became the first president and CEO of ASCII Media Works. It became an internal division of Kadokawa Corporation on October 1, 2013.

The company specializes in publishing of books, entertainment and computer magazines, manga, and video games. ASCII Media Works is known for their Dengeki (電撃; meaning electric shock) brand magazines and book imprints which include such well-known magazines as Dengeki Daioh, and Dengeki G's Magazine, along with the company's main light novel publishing imprint Dengeki Bunko. Most of the company caters to the Japanese male otaku crowd, covering such topics as anime, light novels, manga, plastic modelling, and visual novels. The company also deals with computing and enterprises related to information technology (IT), such as the publication of Weekly ASCII, along with other PC and IT magazines. ASCII Media Works also publishes multiple magazines targeted towards females such as Character Parfait, Dengeki Girl's Style, and Sylph. The company runs yearly contests for original novel and manga submissions, such as the light novel Dengeki Novel Prize contest.

== History ==
ASCII Media Works resulted from a merger between two Japanese publishing companies—ASCII and MediaWorks—on April 1, 2008. The company is a continuation of MediaWorks, but despite this, the former president of ASCII, Kiyoshi Takano, became the president of ASCII Media Works. The company is a member of the Kadokawa Group and is thus affiliated with Kadokawa Shoten, another Japanese publishing company. According to an official press release by Kadokawa Corporation, the merger stemmed from a steady outgrowth in the Internet and mobile parts of society which led publishing companies to branch out to encompass the ever increasing needs and demands of the consumers. Due to mutual company interests, the merger went through to create a stronger company which has more outreaching possibilities than either company could have done on their own.

ASCII brought its expertise with IT and computing. In contrast, MediaWorks brought its expertise of media pertaining to entertainment, such as with visual or printed media including anime, manga, light novels, video games, or magazines covering such media products. In addition to making the combined company more diverse, company management is planned to become more efficient, base revenue is meant to increase, and the company may take on new business opportunities in the future. Enterbrain had been considered for merging with ASCII and MediaWorks, but this was eventually rejected. In April 2011, the video game division of ASCII Media Works was merged into Kadokawa Games along with the video game divisions of Kadokawa Shoten and Enterbrain. ASCII Media Works ceased being a kabushiki gaisha on October 1, 2013, when it was merged with eight other companies to become a brand company of Kadokawa Corporation.

== Magazines published ==
Cover of the first issue of Dengeki Bunko Magazine featuring Shana from Shakugan no Shana

ASCII Media Works publishes magazines under the Dengeki imprint which feature video games, anime, manga, hobbies and special interests; these magazines were previously published by MediaWorks prior to the merger. Information technology magazines previously published by ASCII, such as Weekly ASCII, are now published under ASCII Media Works.

- ASCII Cloud
- Character Parfait
- Comic@loid
- Dengeki Arcade Game
- Dengeki Bunko Magazine
- Dengeki Daioh
- Dengeki G's Magazine
- Dengeki Girl's Style
- Dengeki Hime
- Dengeki Hobby Magazine
- Dengeki Maoh
- Dengeki Nintendo
- Dengeki PlayStation
- Hoshi Navi
- MacPeople
- Mobile ASCII
- Sylph
- Ubuntu Magazine Japan
- Weekly ASCII

== Publishing imprints ==
=== Light novels ===
Dengeki Bunko
Dengeki Bunko (電撃文庫) is a light novel imprint aimed at a male audience established in June 1993. The editors in charge of this imprint have a reputation for welcoming new authors, and hold a yearly contest, the Dengeki Novel Prize, to discover new talent. The eighth volume of Kino's Journey, originally published in October 2006, was Dengeki Bunko's 1000th published novel. In April 2007, three films based on separate light novel series published by Dengeki Bunko were produced; the three titles were Kino's Journey, Shakugan no Shana, and Inukami!.
Aside from the main Dengeki Bunko imprint, there is the sub-imprint Dengeki Game Bunko (電撃ゲーム文庫, Dengeki Gēmu Bunko) established in 1994 when it was originally related with tabletop role-playing games. The imprint stopped production in September 1997 but was later restarted in December 1999 as a computer game and light novel publisher. The imprint succeeded the previous publishing imprint Dengeki G's Bunko.
There is also the light novel imprint Dengeki no Shin Bungei (電撃の新文芸, Dengeki no shin bungei) that focuses on the publication of web novel works in paper format. The label started in January 17, 2019, with the re-release of Boogiepop and Others and is aimed at male audience.

B-Prince Bunko
B-Prince Bunko (B-PRINCE文庫) is a yaoi light novel imprint established in 2008. The imprint held a contest in 2010 to give amateur authors a chance to make a professional debut.

Jewel Books
A light novel imprint that is aimed at adult women, and contains adult drawings. The label started on June 25, 2014, with the release of two light novel volumes.

=== Manga ===
Dengeki Comics
Dengeki Comics (電撃コミックス, Dengeki Komikkusu) is a manga publishing imprint aimed at a male audience. Aside from the main Dengeki Comics imprint, there is the related Dengeki Comics EX imprint which publishes a lesser number of manga volumes. A large amount of the manga published under Dengeki Comics was originally serialized in the manga magazine Dengeki Daioh.

Sylph Comics
Sylph Comics (シルフコミックス, Shirufu Komikkusu) is a manga publishing imprint aimed at a female audience. The manga that are published under this imprint were originally serialized in the shōjo manga magazine Sylph. The first bound volumes were published under this imprint starting on March 21, 2008.

=== Novels ===
Mahō no Island Bunko
Mahō no Island Bunko (魔法のiらんど文庫, Mahō no i-rando Bunko) is a novel imprint established on October 25, 2007, which publishes new works on the mobile phone-accessible service Mahō no Island operated by the company of the same name, which is a subsidiary of ASCII Media Works. Mahō no Island Bunko publishes general novels.
Media Works Bunko
Media Works Bunko (メディアワークス文庫, Media Wākusu Bunko) is a publishing imprint established on December 16, 2009, aimed at a general audience for mainstream novels. Winners of the Media Works Bunko Prize in the Dengeki Novel Prize are published on this imprint, along with winning 500,000 yen.

== Contests ==
Dengeki Comic Grand Prix
The Dengeki Comic Grand Prix (電撃コミックグランプリ, Dengeki Komikku Guran Puri) is an award handed out semiannually (since 2004) and annually (since 2010) by ASCII Media Works for original one-shot manga in two divisions: shōnen and shōjo manga. There are three types of prizes given out each contest: the Grand Prix Prize (2 million yen), the Semi-Grand Prix Prize (500,000 yen), and the Excellence Prize (300,000 yen). The Grand Prix Prize has only been handed out twice in the contest's history, with the first round in 2004 and the third round in 2005. There was also once a Dengeki Moeoh Grand Prize division which was held twice with a Grand Prize and Honorable Mentions.

Dengeki Taishō logo

Dengeki Taishō
The Dengeki Taishō (電撃大賞) is an award handed out annually (since 1994) by ASCII Media Works with two divisions: the Dengeki Novel Prize for light novels under Dengeki Bunko, and the Dengeki Illustration Taishō (電撃イラスト大賞) for illustrations. Each division consists of the Grand Prize (1 million yen), Gold Prize (500,000 yen), Silver Prize (300,000 yen), and Honorable Mention (50,000 yen). The first two rounds also had a game design division called Dengeki Game Design Taishō (電撃ゲームデザイン大賞), and between the third and eleventh rounds there was a manga division called Dengeki Comic Taishō (電撃コミック大賞).

== Video games ==
ASCII Media Works has been in the business of developing and producing video games of series that have light novels or manga published by the company. These games are typically visual novels, a genre of adventure games, but some have also been sound novels, which has less attributes of an adventure game than a normal visual novel. The video games produced are ported to the PlayStation 2 or Nintendo DS. Since ASCII Media Works is a continuation of MediaWorks, the company includes the video games previously produced before the merger with ASCII on its official website for its video games. The video games produced are organized into categories for similarly made games. Aside from the main class of visual and sound novels produced, three games were re-released in the Dengeki SP series at reduced prices from their original release; SP stands for "special price". Another class produced exclusively for the Nintendo DS are under the brand imprint series DS Dengeki Bunko, and are games based on light novels published under ASCII Media Works' male light novel imprint Dengeki Bunko. Five games have been produced under this brand, and the two games in the series based on Iriya no Sora, UFO no Natsu were re-released in a single package together. The company lists the titles which have been the most popular among the games it has produced which include releases based on Sister Princess, DearS, Kino's Journey, Futakoi, and Strawberry Panic!.
