= MediaWorks (publisher) =

Japanese publishing company

MediaWorks, Inc.
- Native name: 株式会社メディアワークス
- Founded: October 15, 1992; 33 years ago
- Defunct: March 31, 2008; 18 years ago
- Fate: Merged with ASCII Corporation
- Successor: ASCII Media Works
- Headquarters: Chiyoda, Tokyo
- Number of locations: Japan
- Website: www.mediaworks.co.jp

MediaWorks, Inc. (株式会社メディアワークス, Kabushiki-gaisha MediaWākusu) was a Japanese publishing company in the Kadokawa Group known for their Dengeki (電撃; meaning electric shock) brand magazines and book labels. These included such well-known magazines as Dengeki Daioh, and Dengeki G's Magazine, along with MediaWorks' main light novel publishing imprint Dengeki Bunko. The company was merged with ASCII on April 1, 2008, and became ASCII Media Works. They mainly catered to the Japanese male otaku crowd, covering such topics as anime, light novels, manga, plastic modelling, and visual novels. However, MediaWorks had published three magazines targeted towards females—Comic Sylph, Dengeki Girl's Style, and Character Parfait—but each one was a special edition version of another magazine. MediaWorks ran yearly contests for original novel and manga submissions, such as the light novel Dengeki Novel Prize contest.

In addition to publishing printed material, MediaWorks had been involved with the production of other media. They had developed and published visual novels for popular Japanese media franchises where many different forms of media are published for a given series. Such well-known series included Kashimashi: Girl Meets Girl, Shakugan no Shana, and Strawberry Marshmallow. MediaWorks had also been involved in the production of anime television and original video animation series.

== History ==
In 1992, Kadokawa Shoten's president Haruki Kadokawa was devoting himself to the movie business, and his younger brother and vice-president of the company, Tsuguhiko Kadokawa, was in charge of magazines the company published. At the same time, Tsuguhiko was the president of Kadokawa's subsidiary Kadokawa Media Office which was in charge of publishing video game magazines like Comptiq, and manga magazines targeted towards the male otaku crowd in Japan centered around "media mix" Japanese series where many different forms of media are published for a given series. Citing differences in the interests of business direction, Tsuguhiko resigned from Kadokawa Shoten to start MediaWorks on October 15, 1992, with a large contingent from Kadokawa Shoten employees joining him.

In 1993, due to an influence from the Tokyo Shock Boys, known in Japan as the Dengeki Network (電撃ネットワーク), MediaWorks launched a series of magazines under the Dengeki line. These magazines were taken from previous publications that Kadokawa Media Office had published. The new magazines were named Dengeki Super Famicom (from Kadokawa's former magazine Marushō Super Famicom), Dengeki PC Engine (from Kadokawa's former magazine Marushō PC Engine), Dengeki Comic Gao! (from Kadokawa's former magazine Comic Comp), the now-defunct Dengeki Oh (taken from Comptiq), and the now-defunct Dengeki Megadrive (originally a special edition of Dengeki PC Engine). Also in 1993, Haruki Kadokawa was arrested for cocaine smuggling and lost his presidency at Kadokawa Shoten, which was soon taken over by Tsuguhiko Kadokawa in addition to his presidency of MediaWorks; MediaWorks was later made a subsidiary of Kadokawa Shoten in 2002. MediaWorks became a member of Kadokawa Group Holdings, and after Enterbrain became a member of the same group, Enterbrain's Famitsu line and MediaWorks' Dengeki line started to compete against each other, especially in terms of presenting information pertaining to bishōjo games. By 2001, MediaWorks specialized in publishing light novels, manga, video games, and magazines pertaining to such media. The company was merged with ASCII on April 1, 2008, and became ASCII Media Works.

== Magazines published ==
- Dengeki Arcade Card Game
- Dengeki Bunko Magazine
- Dengeki Daioh
- Dengeki G's Magazine
- Dengeki Hime
- Dengeki Hobby Magazine
- Dengeki Layers
- Dengeki Maoh
- Dengeki Nintendo DS
- Dengeki PlayStation

== Publishing imprints ==
Dengeki Bunko
Dengeki Bunko (電撃文庫) is a light novel label aimed at a male audience established in June 1993. The editors in charge of this label have a reputation for welcoming new authors, and hold a yearly contest, the Dengeki Novel Prize, to discover new talent. The eighth volume of Kino's Journey, originally published in October 2006, was Dengeki Bunko's one-thousandth published novel. In April 2007, three movies based on separate light novel series published by Dengeki Bunko were produced; the three titles were Kino's Journey, Shakugan no Shana, and Inukami!.
Dengeki Comics
Dengeki Comics (電撃コミックス, Dengeki Komikkusu) is a manga publishing label aimed at a male audience. Aside from the main Dengeki Comics label, there is the related Dengeki Comics EX label which publishes a lesser number of manga volumes. A large amount of the manga published under Dengeki Comics was originally serialized in the magazine Dengeki Daioh.

Dengeki G's Bunko
Dengeki G's Bunko (電撃G's文庫) was a publishing label originally established in 1997 as a light novel label aimed at a male audience—the light novels were based on bishōjo games. The label was run by three men: Mizuhito Akiyama, Hideyuki Kurata, and Masanori Date. As of 2003, the label has been suspended and has been succeeded by Dengeki Game Bunko.

Dengeki Game Bunko
Dengeki Game Bunko (電撃ゲーム文庫, Dengeki Gēmu Bunko) is a publishing label established in 1994 when it was originally related with tabletop role-playing games. The label stopped production in September 1997 but was later restarted in December 1999 as a computer game and light novel publisher. The label succeeded the previous publishing label Dengeki G's Bunko.

Sylph Comics
Sylph Comics is a manga publishing label aimed at a female audience. The manga that are published under this label were originally serialized in the shōjo magazine Comic Sylph. The first bound volumes were published under this label starting on March 21, 2008.

== Contests ==
Dengeki Comic Grand Prix
The Dengeki Comic Grand Prix (電撃コミックグランプリ, Dengeki Komikku Guran Puri) is an award handed out annually (since 2001) by the Japanese publisher MediaWorks for original one-shot manga. Between the first and fifth contests held, there were two divisions: original, and anthology. This was changed from the sixth contest on to a Daioh/Gao! division which covers seinen manga, and a Sylph division which covers shōjo manga. There are four types of prizes given out each contest: the Grand Prix Prize (one-million yen), the Semi-Grand Prix Prize (five-hundred-thousand yen), the Excellence Prize (two-hundred-thousand yen), and the Honorable Mention (one-hundred-thousand yen). There was also once a Dengeki Moeoh Grand Prize division which was held twice with a Grand Prize and Honorable Mentions.
Dengeki hp Tanpenshōsetsu Shō
The Dengeki hp Tanpenshōsetsu Shō (電撃hp短編小説賞) was an award handed out annually between 2000 and 2006 by the Japanese publisher MediaWorks for exceptionally written short stories and novellas. The prize was associated with MediaWorks' now-defunct light novel magazine Dengeki hp. Between the first and fourth contests held, the editorial department of MediaWorks' included the narrowed-down novellas in an issue of Dengeki hp, and the winner was decided from a reader-participation voting poll. This was changed with the fifth though seven contests by the use of a committee to award the prize.
Dengeki Taishō
The Dengeki Taishō (電撃大賞) is an award handed out annually (since 1994) by the Japanese publisher ASCII Media Works with two divisions: the Dengeki Novel Prize for light novels under Dengeki Bunko, and the Dengeki Illustration Taishō (電撃イラスト大賞) for illustrations. Each division consists of the Grand Prize (one million yen), the Gold Prize (five hundred thousand yen), and the Silver Prize (three hundred thousand yen). The first two rounds also had a game design division called Dengeki Game Design Taishō (電撃ゲームデザイン大賞), and between the third and eleventh rounds there was a manga division called Dengeki Comic Taishō (電撃コミック大賞).

== Video games ==
MediaWorks had been in the business of developing and producing video games of series that have light novels or manga published by MediaWorks. These games were typically visual novels, a genre of adventure games, but some have also been sound novels, which has less attributes of an adventure game than a normal visual novel. The video games produced were ported to the PlayStation 2 or Nintendo DS. Earlier games like Emerald Dragon and Ojōsama Express were ported to the PC Engine, Super Famicom, Sega Saturn, and PlayStation. Other games, like those based on the Shakugan no Shana series, were ported to both the PS2 and DS. A section of MediaWorks known as DS Dengeki Bunko produced sound novels playable on the Nintendo DS based from light novels published under MediaWorks' Dengeki Bunko publishing label. These included: Allison, Baccano!, Inukami!, and Iriya no Sora, UFO no Natsu.
