= Rakuen Noise =

Japanese light novel series

- First light novel cover

楽園ノイズ (Rakuen Noizu)
- Genre: Coming-of-age; Romantic comedy
- Novel series
- Written by: Hikaru Sugii
- Published by: Kakuyomu
- Original run: May 1, 2020 – present
- Light novel
- Written by: Hikaru Sugii
- Illustrated by: Yū Akinashi
- Published by: ASCII Media Works
- Imprint: Dengeki Bunko
- Original run: May 9, 2020 – present
- Volumes: 8
- Manga
- Written by: Hikaru Sugii
- Illustrated by: Akisato Shino
- Published by: Media Factory
- Magazine: Monthly Comic Alive
- Original run: March 26, 2022 – December 27, 2023
- Volumes: 3
- icon

Rakuen Noise (Japanese: 楽園ノイズ, Hepburn: Rakuen Noizu; lit. 'Paradise Noise') is a Japanese light novel series written by Hikaru Sugii and illustrated by Yū Akinashi. The series is published by ASCII Media Works, under their Dengeki Bunko imprint, since May 2020, with eight volumes released as of July 2026. A manga adaptation, illustrated by Akisato Shino, ran in Media Factory's Monthly Comic Alive from March 2022 to December 2023.

== Media ==
=== Light novel ===
Written by Hikaru Sugii and illustrated by Yū Akinashi, the series was first published on the web novel platform Kakuyomu on May 1, 2020; the first volume was released on May 9 of the same year. As of July 10, 2026, eight volumes have been released.

No.	Release date	ISBN
1	May 9, 2020	978-4-04-913157-4
2	May 8, 2021	978-4-04-913681-4
3	September 10, 2021	978-4-04-913682-1
4	March 10, 2022	978-4-04-914217-4
5	August 10, 2022	978-4-04-914395-9
6	May 10, 2023	978-4-04-914940-1
7	June 10, 2025	978-4-04-915651-5
8	July 10, 2026	978-4-04-952135-1

=== Manga ===
A manga adaptation, illustrated by Akisato Shino, ran in Media Factory's Monthly Comic Alive from March 26, 2022 to December 27, 2023. Three volumes were released from September 22, 2022, to February 27, 2024; the latter published digitally only.

No.	Release date	ISBN
1	September 22, 2022	978-4-04-681734-1
2	May 10, 2023	978-4-04-682452-3
3	February 27, 2024 (ebook)	—

== Reception ==
The series placed fourth on Takarajimasha's 2021 Kono Light Novel ga Sugoi! New Work category, and placed sixth in the bunkobon category.
