= Media Works Bunko =

Japanese publishing imprint

Media Works Bunko (メディアワークス文庫, Media Wākusu Bunko) is a publishing imprint affiliated with the Japanese publishing company ASCII Media Works. It was established on December 16, 2009 with the publication of eight novels, and is a mainstream novel imprint aimed at a general audience. The imprint is an extension of ASCII Media Works's Dengeki Bunko imprint which publishes light novels. Authors who have moved on from light novels, even ones previously published under Dengeki Bunko, also are published under Media Works Bunko. Winners of the Media Works Bunko Prize in ASCII Media Works' Dengeki Novel Prize annual contest are published on this imprint, along with winning 500,000 yen. The first two winners of the prize in the sixteenth Dengeki Novel Prize held in 2009 were Mado Nozaki, for (Ei) Amrita, and Kaoru Arima, for Taiyō no Akubi.

== Published titles ==
=== 0–9 ===
Title	Author	Release date	ISBN
0 Nōsha Minato	Tohru Hayama	February 25, 2011	ISBN 978-4-04-870138-9
19	Jun Ayasaki, Tsumugu Hashimoto, Hitoma Iruma, Izuki Kōgyoku, Jin Shibamura	December 25, 2010	ISBN 978-4-04-870174-7
4 Girls	Jin Shibamura	January 25, 2011	ISBN 978-4-04-870278-2

=== A ===
Title	Author	Release date	ISBN
Angel Whisper (1)	Chiaki Yamashina	September 25, 2010	ISBN 978-4-04-868906-9
Angel Whisper (2)	Chiaki Yamashina	September 25, 2010	ISBN 978-4-04-868907-6
Aozora Shigure	Jun Ayasaki	January 25, 2010	ISBN 978-4-04-868290-9

=== B ===
Title	Author	Release date	ISBN
Baka ga Zenra de Yattekuru	Hitoma Iruma	August 25, 2010	ISBN 978-4-04-868819-2
Bokura no Kiseki	Tōka Shigatsu	February 25, 2010	ISBN 978-4-04-868382-1
Boku to Kanojo to Girl Game na Tatakai	Yu Nishimura	November 25, 2010	ISBN 978-4-04-870154-9
Bumen Matome to Omote no Onna	Mado Nozaki	April 26, 2010	ISBN 978-4-04-868581-8

=== C ===
Title	Author	Release date	ISBN
Cerberus (1)	Hideyuki Furuhashi	December 16, 2009	ISBN 978-4-04-868219-0
Chōnōryokusha no Ita Natsu	Kōya Teramoto	June 25, 2010	ISBN 978-4-04-868662-4
Custom Child: Tsumi to Batsu	Yukako Kabei	December 16, 2009	ISBN 978-4-04-868223-7

=== D ===
Title	Author	Release date	ISBN
Dark Side: Yami to Hikari to Christmas	Iori Takayura	March 25, 2010	ISBN 978-4-04-868470-5
Dog Opera	Nobuyoshi Kondo	December 25, 2010	ISBN 978-4-04-870175-4

=== E ===
Title	Author	Release date	ISBN
(Ei) Amrita	Mado Nozaki	December 16, 2009	ISBN 978-4-04-868269-5
Eien Kōro	Jun Ayasaki	July 26, 2010	ISBN 978-4-04-868774-4

=== F ===
Title	Author	Release date	ISBN
Furen	Gara Nagata	August 25, 2010	ISBN 978-4-04-868822-2
Fushigi-kei Jōshi no Kōryakuhō	Akito Mizusawa	November 25, 2010	ISBN 978-4-04-870153-2

=== G ===
Title	Author	Release date	ISBN
Garden Lost	Izuki Kōgyoku	January 25, 2010	ISBN 978-4-04-868288-6

=== H ===
Title	Author	Release date	ISBN
Hatsukoi Suisei	Jun Ayasaki	May 25, 2010	ISBN 978-4-04-868584-9
Hitoribocchi no Ō-sama to Side Throw no Ohime-sama	Sorajūrō Kashiwaba	February 25, 2010	ISBN 978-4-04-868381-4
Hitoribocchi no Ō-sama to Side Throw no Ohime-sama 2	Sorajūrō Kashiwaba	July 26, 2010	ISBN 978-4-04-868816-1
Hydra no Kokuhaku	Jin Shibamura	March 25, 2010	ISBN 978-4-04-868465-1

=== I ===
Title	Author	Release date	ISBN
Ikenie no Dilemma (1)	Shinjirō Tobashi	September 25, 2010	ISBN 978-4-04-868932-8
Ikenie no Dilemma (2)	Shinjirō Tobashi	October 25, 2010	ISBN 978-4-04-868933-5
Ikenie no Dilemma (3)	Shinjirō Tobashi	December 25, 2010	ISBN 978-4-04-868934-2

=== K ===
Title	Author	Release date	ISBN
Kan	Gara Nagata	February 25, 2010	ISBN 978-4-04-868384-5
Kimi ni Tsuzuku Senro	Tōru Minetsuki	February 25, 2010	ISBN 978-4-04-868383-8
Kurogane Baka Nikki	Kaoru Yasuhiko	July 26, 2010	ISBN 978-4-04-868703-4

=== M ===
Title	Author	Release date	ISBN
Maid Road Reload	Yūsaku Kitano	April 26, 2010	ISBN 978-4-04-868534-4
Maioh	Gara Nagata	May 25, 2010	ISBN 978-4-04-868582-5
Makai Tantei Meiōsei O Pain no P	Matarō Echizen	June 25, 2010	ISBN 978-4-04-868659-4
Makai Tantei Meiōsei O Toy Box no T	Matarō Echizen	August 25, 2010	ISBN 978-4-04-868729-4
Malicious Claim	Akibare Hanno	June 25, 2010	ISBN 978-4-04-868661-7
Malicious Claim 2	Akibare Hanno	October 25, 2010	ISBN 978-4-04-870055-9
Manatsu no Hi no Yume	Tōka Shigatsu	February 25, 2011	ISBN 978-4-04-870346-8
Megenai-kun to Spicy Onna Jōshi: Megamitachi no Iru Shokuba	Kaoru Arima	August 25, 2010	ISBN 978-4-04-868704-1
Metamoru.	Tensei Hibiki	November 25, 2010	ISBN 978-4-04-870137-2
Mikkakan no Kōfuku	Miaki Sugaru	December 25, 2013	ISBN 978-4-04-866169-0

=== O ===
Title	Author	Release date	ISBN
Ocha ga Hakobaretekuru Made ni: A Book At Cafe	Keiichi Sigsawa (with illustrations by Kouhaku Kuroboshi)	January 25, 2010	ISBN 978-4-04-868286-2
Ocharake Ō	Shūtarō Kuchibaya	February 25, 2011	ISBN 978-4-04-870282-9
Omoidashitaku mo Nai Jinsei Saiaku no 96 Jikan	Bunshō Fuse	September 25, 2010	ISBN 978-4-04-868931-1
Onmyō no Miyako Getsufūtan: Kurobō no Oni	Soichiro Watase	December 16, 2009	ISBN 978-4-04-868224-4
Onmyō no Miyako Getsufūtan 2: Setsuhō no Ōkami	Soichiro Watase	August 25, 2010	ISBN 978-4-04-868821-5
Ore no Convenience Store	Tōru Minetsuki	August 25, 2010	ISBN 978-4-04-868800-0

=== P ===
Title	Author	Release date	ISBN
Psyche no Namida	Jin Shibamura	February 25, 2010	ISBN 978-4-04-868385-2

=== R ===
Title	Author	Release date	ISBN
Roppyaku-roku-jū-en no Jijō	Hitoma Iruma	May 25, 2010	ISBN 978-4-04-868583-2

=== S ===
Title	Author	Release date	ISBN
Satsuriku Game no Kan (1)	Shinjirō Dobashi	March 25, 2010	ISBN 978-4-04-868468-2
Satsuriku Game no Kan (2)	Shinjirō Dobashi	March 25, 2010	ISBN 978-4-04-868469-9
Seija no Shikijitsu	Jin Shibamura	April 26, 2010	ISBN 978-4-04-868532-0
Shinigami to Sakura Drive	Kaoru Arima	March 25, 2010	ISBN 978-4-04-868467-5
Shinanai Seito Satsujin Jiken: Shikibetsu Kumiko to Samayoeru Fushi	Mado Nozaki	October 25, 2010	ISBN 978-4-04-870056-6
Shōkei no Saki ni Aru Mono	Marehito Mikagami	June 25, 2010	ISBN 978-4-04-868660-0
Sora no Kanata	Manabi Hishida	January 25, 2010	ISBN 978-4-04-868289-3
Sora no Kanata 2	Manabi Hishida	May 25, 2010	ISBN 978-4-04-868611-2
Sora no Kanata 3	Manabi Hishida	October 25, 2010	ISBN 978-4-04-870044-3
Sora o Sakana ga Oyogu Koro	Natsu Asaba	February 25, 2011	ISBN 978-4-04-870283-6
Subete no Ai ga Yurusareru Shima	Hikaru Sugii	December 16, 2009	ISBN 978-4-04-868220-6

=== T ===
Title	Author	Release date	ISBN
Taiyō no Akubi	Kaoru Arima	December 16, 2009	ISBN 978-4-04-868270-1
Tanpopo no Mamori Hito	Satoshi Ejima	April 26, 2010	ISBN 978-4-04-868533-7
Tantei Hanasaki Tarō wa Hiramekanai	Hitoma Iruma	December 16, 2009	ISBN 978-4-04-868222-0
Tantei Hanasaki Tarō wa Kutsugaesanai	Hitoma Iruma	February 25, 2010	ISBN 978-4-04-868386-9
Tantei Higure Tabibito no Wasuremono	Kōzaburō Yamaguchi	September 25, 2010	ISBN 978-4-04-868930-4
Tantei Higure Tabibito no Nakushimono	Kōzaburō Yamaguchi	January 25, 2011	ISBN 978-4-04-870279-9
Theater!	Hiro Arikawa	December 16, 2009	ISBN 978-4-04-868221-3
Theater! 2	Hiro Arikawa	January 25, 2011	ISBN 978-4-04-870280-5
Titans no Hata no Moto ni (1)	Bin Konno	July 26, 2010	ISBN 978-4-04-868775-1
Titans no Hata no Moto ni (2)	Bin Konno	July 26, 2010	ISBN 978-4-04-868776-8
Toiki Yukiiro	Jun Ayasaki	November 25, 2010	ISBN 978-4-04-870053-5
Tokkyūbin Girl!	Mamoru Minagawa	February 25, 2011	ISBN 978-4-04-870385-7

=== Y ===
Title	Author	Release date	ISBN
Yama: Kai	Gakuto Coda	January 25, 2010	ISBN 978-4-04-868287-9
Yoru ga Hakobaretekuru Made ni: A Book in a Bed	Keiichi Sigsawa	December 25, 2010	ISBN 978-4-04-870235-5
Yumemiru Kanojo no Kimyō na Aijō	Shinya Tajima	January 25, 2011	ISBN 978-4-04-870277-5
