= Machino-san Wants A Retort =

Japanese light novel series

- The cover of the first light novel volume, featuring Suzuri Machino

ツッコミ待ちの町野さん (Tsukkomi-machi no Machino-san)
- Genre: Romantic comedy
- Light novel
- Written by: Nichopin
- Illustrated by: Sako
- Published by: ASCII Media Works
- Imprint: Dengeki Bunko
- Original run: February 7, 2025 – present
- Volumes: 2
- Manga
- Written by: Nichopin
- Illustrated by: Kuunerin
- Published by: Kadokawa Shoten
- Imprint: Kadokawa Comics A
- Magazine: Shōnen Ace Plus
- Original run: June 9, 2025 – October 12, 2026
- Volumes: 1
- icon

Machino-san Wants A Retort (Japanese: ツッコミ待ちの町野さん, Hepburn: Tsukkomi-machi no Machino-san) is a Japanese light novel series written by Nichopin and illustrated by Sako. It began publication by ASCII Media Works under their Dengeki Bunko imprint in February 2025. As of June 2025, two volumes have been released. A manga adaptation illustrated by Kuunerin was serialized online via Kadokawa Shoten's Shōnen Ace Plus website from June 2025 to October 2026.

== Plot ==
Namito Nitanda, an introverted high school student, unintentionally messed up his self-introduction on the first day of school, causing him to be known socially as "The Guy Who Failed His High School Debut". He founded the Domino Club, in which he is the only member. One day, out of nowhere, the popular girl in his class and a member of the swimming club, Suzuri Machino, barges into the clubroom and starts setting up jokes in skit-style conversations, causing Nitanda to retort. Thus starts the cross-cultural exchange romantic comedy, which revolves around skits, banter, idle chatter, and late-night radio jokes.

== Characters ==
Namito Nitanda (二反田並人, Nitanda Namito)
A high school student who is the president and the only member of the Domino Club in his school. He initially aimed to go for a chill and funny character in his self-introduction on the first day of school, but he messed up the introduction and, in turn, was considered an awkward person whom everyone tried not to interact with. He likes dominoes, animals, and sticking his hands between stacked futons. He is fully aware of his low communication and social skills, but he finds it comfortable when interacting and bantering with Suzuri in the clubroom. He usually goes along with Suzuri's skit, which ends with him delivering retorts to her jokes. It is heavily implied that he has a crush on Suzuri, but refuses to act further to maintain the status quo.
Suzuri Machino (町野硯, Machino Suzuri)
Namito's classmate and one of the most popular girls in his class. She is a member of the swimming club of their school and one of its strongest members. She usually drops by the Domino Club clubroom before heading to her club. Unbeknownst to most people, she is well-versed in jokes and also in popular memes. She likes to dance, listen to late-night radio shows, the sea, sunshower and insects. Despite frequently eating chikawa, she claims that it is just normal food to her. It is also heavily implied that she has a crush on Namito, and sometimes she gets jealous whenever Namito goes on a date or talks with another girl. She lives extremely close to the school, close enough that she claims she can use the trampoline in her yard to jump straight to her classroom balcony.
Beni Yukide (雪出紅, Yukiide Beni)
Genki Yagi (八木元気, Yagi Genki)
Io Arakune (安楽寝伊緒, Arakune Io)
Shusai Sakamoto (坂本秀斎, Sakamoto Shuusai)

== Media ==
=== Light novels ===
Written by Nichopin and illustrated by Sako, Machino-san Wants A Retort began publication under ASCII Media Works's Dengeki Bunko imprint, with the first volume being released on February 7, 2025. Two volumes have been released as of June 2025.

==== Volumes ====
| No. | Release date | ISBN |
|---|---|---|
| 1 | February 7, 2025 | 978-4-04-9161038 |
| 2 | June 10, 2025 | 978-4-04-9164152 |

=== Manga ===
A manga adaptation illustrated by Kuunerin was serialized on Kadokawa Shoten's Shōnen Ace Plus website from June 9, 2025, to October 12, 2026. A single tankōbon volume has been released as of December 2025.

==== Volumes ====
| No. | Release date | ISBN |
|---|---|---|
| 1 | December 26, 2025 | 978-4-04-1168912 |
| 2 | November 25, 2026 | 978-4-04-1179567 |
