= Tsubasa (disambiguation) =

Tsubasa is a unisex Japanese given name.

Tsubasa may also refer to:

- Tsubasa (train), a train service in Japan
- "Tsubasa" (Candies song)
- "Tsubasa" (Alice Nine song)
- "Tsubasa" (Eir Aoi song)
- Tsubasa: Very Best of Mikuni Shimokawa, a 2009 compilation album by Mikuni Shimokawa
- Tsubasa: Reservoir Chronicle and its sequel Tsubasa World Chronicle: Nirai Kanai-hen, Japanese manga and anime series by Clamp
- Tsubasa: Those with Wings, a Japanese manga series by Natsuki Takaya
- Tsubasa Bridge, official name of the Neak Loeung Bridge in Cambodia

== See also ==
- Tackey & Tsubasa, a Japanese musical duo
- Captain Tsubasa, a Japanese manga and anime series by Yoichi Takahashi
- "Tsubasa o Kudasai", a Japanese folk song
- Tsubasacon, an annual autumn anime convention in Huntington, West Virginia
