= I Can't Exploit It Because of the Expectations and Evaluation From Slaves =

Japanese light novel series

- First light novel volume cover

奴隷からの期待と評価のせいで搾取できないのだが (Dorei kara no Kitai to Hyōka no Sei de Sakushu Dekinai nodaga)
- Genre: Fantasy, isekai
- Novel series
- Written by: Maware Isogawa
- Published by: Kakuyomu
- Original run: April 6, 2022 – March 21, 2023
- Light novel
- Written by: Maware Isogawa
- Illustrated by: Heiro
- Published by: ASCII Media Works
- Imprint: Dengeki no Shin Bungei
- Original run: March 17, 2023 – present
- Volumes: 5
- Manga
- Written by: Maware Isogawa
- Illustrated by: Sachi Nishioka
- Published by: Kadokawa Shoten
- Imprint: Kadokawa Comics A
- Magazine: Shōnen Ace Plus
- Original run: October 3, 2023 – present
- Volumes: 5
- Anime television series

I Can't Exploit It Because of the Expectations and Evaluation From Slaves (Japanese: 奴隷からの期待と評価のせいで搾取できないのだが, Hepburn: Dorei kara no Kitai to Hyōka no Sei de Sakushu Dekinai nodaga; lit. 'Thanks to the Enslaved's Expectations and Admiration, I Can't Exploit Them, But') is a Japanese light novel series written by Maware Isogawa and illustrated by Heiro. It was serialized online from April 2022 to March 2023 on Kadokawa's user-generated novel publishing website Kakuyomu. It was later published by ASCII Media Works with five volumes since March 2023 under their Dengeki no Shin Bungei imprint. A manga adaptation with art by Sachi Nishioka has been serialized online via Kadokawa Shoten's Shōnen Ace Plus website since October 2023 and has been collected in five tankōbon volumes. An anime television series adaptation has been announced.

== Media ==
=== Light novel ===
Written by Maware Isogawa, I Can't Exploit It Because of the Expectations and Evaluation From Slaves was serialized as a web novel on Kadokawa Corporation's Kakuyomu website from April 6, 2022, to March 21, 2023. It later began publication with illustrations by Heiro under ASCII Media Works' Dengeki no Shin Bungei light novel imprint on March 17, 2023. Five volumes have been released as of October 16, 2026.

No.	Release date	ISBN
1	March 17, 2023	978-4-04-914673-8
2	September 15, 2023	978-4-04-915207-4
3	July 17, 2024	978-4-04-915762-8
4	June 17, 2025	978-4-04-916406-0
5	October 16, 2026	978-4-04-916853-2

=== Manga ===
A manga adaptation illustrated by Sachi Nishioka began serialization on Kadokawa Shoten's Shōnen Ace Plus manga website on October 3, 2023. The manga's chapters have been collected in five tankōbon volumes as of September 2026.

No.	Release date	ISBN
1	May 24, 2024	978-4-04-114895-2
2	August 26, 2024	978-4-04-115430-4
3	March 24, 2025	978-4-04-116060-2
4	November 26, 2025	978-4-04-116696-3
5	September 25, 2026	978-4-04-117440-1

=== Anime ===
An anime television series adaptation was announced during the "Dengeki Bunko Fall Festival Online 2026" livestream event on October 3, 2026.
