= Hikaru Sugii =

Japanese light novel author (born 1978)

Hikaru Sugii 杉井 光
- Occupation: Writer
- Writing career
- Language: Japanese

Hikaru Sugii (杉井 光, Sugii Hikaru; born 1978 in Tokyo) is a Japanese light novel author. In 2005, his debut work Hime no Miko won the Silver Prize at the 12th Dengeki Novel Prize.

== Works ==
- Hime no Miko (Dengeki Bunko, February 2006 –)
- Kami-sama no Memo-chō (Dengeki Bunko, 9 Volumes, January 2007 – September 10, 2014)
- Sayonara Piano Sonata (Dengeki Bunko, 4 Volumes + 1 Bonus, November 2007 – October 2009)
- Shizume no Itaka (Ichijinsha Bunko, May 2008 –)
- Sakura Familia! (Ichijinsha Bunko, August 2008 –)
- Bakerano! (GA Bunko, September 2008 –)
- The Sword Queen and The Branded Child (MF Bunko J, April 2009 –)
- Subete no Ai ga Yurusareru Shima (Media Works Bunko, December 2009)
- Shion no Ketsuzoku (Ichijinsha Bunko, March 2010 –)
- Owaru Sekai no Album (ASCII Media Works, October 2010)
- Hanasakeru Aerial Force (Gagaga Bunko, February 2011)
- Seitokai Tantei Kirika (Kondansha, 4 Volumes, December 2011 –)
- Gakusei Shoujo (楽聖少女) (Dengeki Bunko, 3 Volumes, May 2012 – November 9th 2013)
