= Tsubasa =

- Gender: Both

Origin
- Origin: Japanese
- Meaning: Different meanings depending on the kanji used

Tsubasa (written: 翼, 翔, 飛翔 or つばさ in hiragana) is a unisex Japanese given name. Notable people with the name include:

- Tsubasa (wrestler), Japanese professional wrestler
- Tsubasa Aizawa (會澤 翼; born 1988), Japanese baseball player
- Tsubasa Akimoto (秋本 つばさ; born 1974), Japanese actress
- Tsubasa Aoki (青木 翼; born 1993), Japanese footballer
- Tsubasa Endoh (遠藤 翼; born 1993), Japanese footballer
- Tsubasa Fukuchi (福地 翼; born 1980), Japanese manga artist
- Tsubasa Hasegawa (長谷川 翼; born 1994), Japanese speed skater
- Tsubasa Hisahara (久原 翼; born 1995), Japanese Volleyball player
- Tsubasa Honda (本田 翼; born 1992), Japanese actress and model
- Tsubasa Imai (今井 翼; born 1981), Japanese singer and actor
- Tsubasa Kato (加藤 翼; born 1984), Japanese contemporary artist
- Tsubasa Kina (喜納翼), Japanese wheelchair racer
- Tsubasa Kitatsuru (北津留 翼; born 1985), Japanese cyclist
- Tsubasa Kuragaki (倉垣 翼; born 1975), Japanese professional wrestler
- Tsubasa Masuwaka (益若 つばさ; born 1985), Japanese fashion model
- Tsubasa Nakagawa (中川 翼; born 2005), Japanese actor
- Tsubasa Nihei (二瓶 翼; born 1994), Japanese footballer
- Tsubasa Nishi (西 翼; born 1990), Japanese footballer
- Tsubasa Oshima (大島 翼; born 1983), Japanese footballer
- Tsubasa Otomiya (音宮 つばさ; born 1978), Japanese voice actress
- Tsubasa Oya (大屋 翼; born 1986), Japanese footballer
- Tsubasa Sano (佐野 翼; born 1994), Japanese footballer
- Tsubasa Sasaki (born 1995), Japanese slalom canoeist
- Tsubasa Shibuya (渋谷 飛翔; born 1995), Japanese footballer
- Tsubasa Terayama (寺山 翼; born 2000), Japanese footballer
- Tsubasa Yamaguchi (山口つばさ), Japanese manga artist
- Tsubasa Yokotake (横竹 翔; born 1989), Japanese footballer
- Tsubasa Yonaga (代永 翼; born 1984), Japanese voice actor and singer
- Tsubasa Yoshihira (吉平 翼; born 1998), Japanese footballer

== Fictional characters ==
- Tsubasa Andō, a character in the anime and manga series Gakuen Alice
- Tsubasa Arihara, a character in Cinderella Nine
- Tsubasa Hanekawa, a character in the Monogatari series
- Tsubasa Kashiwagi, a character in The Idolmaster SideM
- Tsubasa Katsuragi, a character in the light novel series You Like Me, Not My Daughter?!
- Tsubasa Kawana, a character in the video game The Hundred Line: Last Defense Academy
- Tsubasa Kazanari, a character in the anime series Symphogear
- Tsubasa Kira, a character in Love Live! School Idol Project
- Tsubasa Kurenai, a character in the anime series Ranma ½
- Tsubasa Li (李 ツバサ), one of the protagonists of the manga Tsubasa: Reservoir Chronicle
- Tsubasa Misudachi (三栖立 つばさ), a character in the anime series Gatchaman Crowds
- Tsubasa Nishikiori, a character featured in the works of Go Nagai
- Tsubasa Oozora (大空 翼), protagonist of the manga series Captain Tsubasa
- Tsubasa Oribe (織部 つばさ), one of the protagonists of Tokyo Mirage Sessions ♯FE
- Tsubasa Otori, one of the protagonists in Beyblade: Metal Fusion
- Tsubasa Ozu, a character in the tokusatsu series Mahou Sentai Magiranger
- Tsubasa Sena, a character in the anime series Aikatsu!
- Tsubasa Yuunagi, one of the characters in the anime series Soaring Sky! Pretty Cure
