= The S-class Beautiful Girl Who Hates Me a lot is My Follower in the Game World =

Japanese light novel series

- Cover of the first light novel volume published by ASCII Media Works, featuring Mika Negoto (Mike).

僕をこっぴどく嫌うS級美少女はゲーム世界で僕の信者 (Boku o Koppidoku Kirau S-kyū Bishōjo wa Gēmu Sekai de Boku no Shinja)
- Genre: Romance, science fiction
- Light novel
- Written by: Akira Aihara
- Illustrated by: Chisato Kobayashi
- Published by: ASCII Media Works
- Imprint: Dengeki Bunko
- Original run: May 9, 2020 – ended
- Volumes: 1

The S-class Beautiful Girl Who Hates Me a lot is My Follower in the Game World (僕をこっぴどく嫌うS級美少女はゲーム世界で僕の信者, Boku o Koppidoku Kirau S-kyū Bishōjo wa Gēmu Sekai de Boku no Shinja) is a Japanese light novel series written by Akira Aihara and illustrated by Chisato Kobayashi. The series began publishing on May 9, 2020, by ASCII Media Works under the Dengeki Bunko publishing imprint.

== Plot ==
Masumi Kanbe is an elite high school student who works hard day and night to become the Cabinet Secretary. In order to save Mika Negoto, a beautiful girl who refuses to go to school, he logs into the "devil's VR online game" where she is, but she dislikes him by telling the "truth". ID was also blocked, and he had no choice but to enter with another red card. The cousin's account that he used without permission belongs to the popular commentator that Negoto enthusiastically adores.

== Characters ==
Masumi Kanbe (神部 真澄, Kanbe Masumi) / Munchkin (マンチカン, Manchikan)
The text on the right is "Not late, not absent". His dream for the future is Chief Cabinet Secretary. He tries to solve the problem of Mika Negoto's school refusal because of a personal statement.
Mika Negoto (音琴 美加, Negoto Mika) / Mike (ミケ, Mike)
Masumi's classmate and beautiful S-class girl, she suddenly stops coming to school, even though she is friendly and has no behavior problems.
Chihiro Kanbe (神部 千尋, Kanbe Chihiro) / Abyssinian (アビシニアン, Abishinian)
Chihiro is a cousin who lives next door to Masumi. She is a sophomore in middle school with god-level playing techniques.

== Media ==
=== Light novels ===
This light novel is written by Akira Aihara and illustrated by Chisato Kobayashi. ASCII Media Works has published a single volume since May 2020 under their Dengeki Bunko imprint.

No.	Japanese release date	Japanese ISBN
1	May 9, 2020	9784049132144
