= Mamizu Arisawa =

Female Japanese light novelist

- 有沢 まみず
- Born: May 18, 1976 (age 50); Tokyo, Japan
- Occupation: Light novelist
- Writing career
- Language: Japanese
- Notable works: Infinity Zero, Inukami!, Lucky Chance!, The World God Only Knows
- Notable awards: Silver Prize, Dengeki Novel Prize (2001)

Mamizu Arisawa (有沢 まみず, Arisawa Mamizu; born May 18, 1976) is a Japanese light novelist from Tokyo, Japan. In 2001, Arisawa won the silver prize in the eighth installment of MediaWorks' Dengeki Novel Prize with his work Infinity Zero. Following this, the novel was published by MediaWorks under their Dengeki Bunko label, and three other volumes in the series were subsequently published. Following the end of Infinity Zero, Arisawa began work on Inukami! in April 2002 until the release of Inukami!'s last volume in September 2007. In December 2007, Arisawa began to write a new series entitled Lucky Chance!.

== Works ==
- Infinity Zero series
1. Infinity Zero Fuyu: White Snow
2. Infinity Zero (2) Haru: White Blossom
3. Infinity Zero (3) Natsu: White Moon
4. Infinity Zero (4) Aki: Darkness Pure
- Inukami! series
1. Inukami!
2. Inukami! 2
3. Inukami! 3
4. Inukami! 4
5. Inukami! 5
6. Inukami! 6
7. Inukami! 7
8. Inukami! 8: Kawahira-ke no Ichiban Nagai Ichinichi
9. Inukami! 9: Happy Hop Step Jump!
10. Inukami! 10
11. Inukami! 11
12. Inukami! 12
13. Inukami! 13 Kanketsuhen (part 1): Hop Step Dash
14. Inukami! 14 Kanketsuhen (part 2): Fly High High
15. Inukami! EX Wan!
16. Inukami! Special Edition
- Lucky Chance! series
1. Lucky Chance!
2. Lucky Chance! 2
- The World God Only Knows series
1. The World God Only Knows 1: God and the Demon and an Angel
