= You Like Me, Not My Daughter?! =

Japanese light novel series

- First light novel volume cover, featuring Ayako Katsuragi

娘じゃなくて私が好きなの！？ (Musume Janakute, Mama ga Suki Nano!?)
- Genre: Romantic comedy
- Light novel
- Written by: Kōta Nozomi
- Illustrated by: Giuniu
- Published by: ASCII Media Works
- English publisher: NA: J-Novel Club
- Imprint: Dengeki Bunko
- Original run: December 10, 2019 – April 28, 2022
- Volumes: 7
- Manga
- Written by: Kōta Nozomi
- Illustrated by: Tesshin Azuma
- Published by: Hakusensha
- English publisher: NA: Seven Seas Entertainment
- Imprint: Young Animal Comics
- Magazine: Manga Park
- Original run: September 12, 2020 – present
- Volumes: 10
- icon

You Like Me, Not My Daughter?! (娘じゃなくて私が好きなの！？, Musume Janakute, Mama ga Suki Nano!?) is a Japanese light novel series written by Kōta Nozomi and illustrated by Giuniu. It was published under ASCII Media Works' Dengeki Bunko imprint from December 2019 to April 2022. A manga adaptation illustrated by Tesshin Azuma began serialization on Hakusensha's Manga Park manga service in September 2020.

== Plot ==
Ayako Katsuragi, a woman in her thirties, has spent the past decade raising her niece Miu as her own daughter after her sister and brother-in-law died in an accident. As Miu enters high school, Ayako begins to notice signs of first love and assumes it involves their kind, college-aged neighbor Takumi "Takkun" Aterazawa, who has tutored Miu since childhood. Believing Takumi to be a suitable match, Ayako prepares herself for the possibility that he may ask for her daughter's hand. Instead, Takkun confesses that his feelings are not for Miu, but for Ayako, revealing that he has long admired her. Caught off guard by the age gap and her responsibility as Miu's guardian, Ayako struggles with how such a relationship might affect her family.

== Characters ==
Ayako Katsuragi (歌枕綾子, Katsuragi Ayako)
Voiced by: Ai Kayano (PV)
A kind, though somewhat dense 34-year old woman who took in Miu following her parents' death.
Takumi Aterazawa (左沢巧, Aterazawa Takumi)
Voiced by: Nobunaga Shimazaki (PV)
A 20-year old university student who is childhood friends with Miu.
Miu Katsuragi (歌枕美羽, Katsuragi Miu)
A 15-year old high school student, who is tutored by Takumi, and the adoptive daughter of Ayako.

== Media ==
=== Light novel ===
Written by Kōta Nozomi with illustrations by Giuniu, You Love Me, Not My Daughter?! was published under ASCII Media Works' Dengeki Bunko light novel imprint from December 10, 2019, to April 28, 2022. Seven volumes were released. The light novels are licensed in English by J-Novel Club.

No.	Original release date	Original ISBN	North American release date	North American ISBN
1	December 10, 2019	978-4-04-912612-9	July 28, 2023	978-1-71-837784-4
Prologue; Chapter One: "The Mother and the Boy"; Chapter Two: "The Confession and the Confusion"; Chapter Three: "Daily Life and Change"; Chapter Four: "The Past and The Promise"; Chapter Five: "The Plan and The Chaos"; Chapter Six: "Truths and Pretenses"; Chapter Seven: "Women and Men"; Epilogue
2	April 10, 2020	978-4-04-913154-3	September 29, 2023	978-1-71-837786-8
Prologue; Chapter One: "Preparation and Execution"; Chapter Two: "The Room and Bedside Manner"; Chapter Three: "The Holy Night and the Swimsuit"; Chapter Four: "The Lone Wolf and the Sudden Attack"; Chapter Five: "The Plan and the Purpose"; Chapter Six: "Paradise and Pleasure"; Chapter Seven: "Lodging and Lust"; Epilogue
3	September 10, 2020	978-4-04-913320-2	December 1, 2023	978-1-71-837788-2
Prologue; Chapter One: "The Declaration and the Triangle"; Chapter Two: "The Visit to Tokyo and the Swimsuit"; Chapter Three: "The Vacation and the Trip"; Chapter Four: "The Night Sky and the Mixed Bath"; Chapter Five: "The Mother, the Daughter, and the Young Man"; Chapter Six: "The Truth and the Trump Card"; Chapter Seven: "The Gift and the Decision"; Chapter Eight: "The Mother and the Daughter"; Chapter Nine: "The Promise and the Fulfillment"; Epilogue
4	January 9, 2021	978-4-04-913621-0	February 2, 2024	978-1-71-837790-5
Prologue; Chapter One: "The Kiss and the Wandering"; Chapter Two: "The Doctor and the Curtain"; Chapter Three: "The Parents' House and the Sprain"; Chapter Four: "The Confession and the Underwear"; Chapter Five: "The Separation and the Transfer"; Chapter Six: "Work and Love"; Epilogue
5	May 8, 2021	978-4-04-913829-0	April 5, 2024	978-1-71-837792-9
Prologue; Chapter One: "Cohabitation and Circumstances"; Chapter Two: "The Naked Body and the Apron"; Chapter Three: "Cohabitation and the First Night"; Chapter Four: "Work and Jealousy"; Chapter Five: "The Past and the Reunion"; Chapter Six: "Dating and the Secret"; Chapter Seven: "Desires and Frustrations"; Chapter Eight: "Hesitation and Consideration"; Chapter Nine: "The Declaration and Misunderstanding"; Epilogue
6	November 10, 2021	978-4-04-914098-9	June 11, 2024	978-1-71-837794-3
Prologue; Chapter One: "The Bathroom and the Steamy Night"; Chapter Two: "The Bedroom and the Sweet Night"; Chapter Three: "Maturity and Exercise"; Chapter Four: "The Release and the Reunion"; Chapter Five: "The Day Off and Shibuya"; Chapter Six: "Mother and Son"; Chapter Seven: "The Biological Mother and the Adoptive Mother"; Epilogue
7	April 28, 2022	978-4-04-914287-7	September 10, 2024	978-1-71-837796-7
Prologue; Chapter One: "The Pregnancy and the Announcement"; Chapter Two: "The Symptoms and the Decision"; Chapter Three: "The Last Chance and the Reverse Bunny"; Chapter Four: "The Holy Night and the Vow"; Chapter Five: "The Afterglow and Daily Life"; Chapter Six: "Marriage and the Wedding"; Epilogue

=== Manga ===
A manga adaptation illustrated by Tesshin Azuma began serialization on Hakusensha's Manga Park manga service on September 12, 2020. The manga's chapters have been compiled into ten tankōbon volumes as of September 2026. The manga adaptation is licensed in English by Seven Seas Entertainment.

No.	Original release date	Original ISBN	North American release date	North American ISBN
1	May 10, 2021	978-4-592-16546-0	November 22, 2022	978-1-63858-672-2
Chapters 1–5
2	November 10, 2021	978-4-592-16547-7	January 10, 2023	978-1-63858-921-1
Chapters 6–10
3	April 27, 2022	978-4-592-16548-4	June 6, 2023	978-1-68579-591-7
Chapters 11–15
4	November 29, 2022	978-4-592-16549-1	August 20, 2024	979-8-88843-060-6
Chapters 16–20
5	July 28, 2023	978-4-592-16550-7	January 7, 2025	979-8-88843-406-2
Chapters 21–25
6	January 29, 2024	978-4-592-16563-7	June 17, 2025	979-8-89160-987-7
Chapters 26–30
7	September 27, 2024	978-4-592-16564-4	December 9, 2025	979-8-89373-971-8
Chapters 31–35
8	March 28, 2025	978-4-592-16565-1	May 26, 2026	979-8-89765-126-9
Chapters 36–40
9	November 28, 2025	978-4-592-16595-8	October 27, 2026	979-8-89863-274-8
Chapters 41–45
10	September 29, 2026	978-4-592-16722-8	June 8, 2027	979-8-90209-089-2
Chapters 46–50

=== Other ===
A promotional video was uploaded to the Dengeki Bunko YouTube channel on January 7, 2021. The video featured voices from Ai Kayano and Nobunaga Shimazaki.
