= Dengeki Novel Prize =

Japanese literary award

The Dengeki Novel Prize (Japanese: 電撃小説大賞, Hepburn: Dengeki Shōsetsu Taishō) is a Japanese literary award handed out annually (since 1994) by the Japanese publisher ASCII Media Works (formerly MediaWorks) for their Dengeki Bunko light novel imprint. The contest has discovered many popular and successful light novelists, like Kouhei Kadono and Yashichiro Takahashi. Originally called the Dengeki Game Novel Prize, the name was changed in 2003. The main Dengeki Novel Prize awards consist of the Grand Prize (¥3 million), Gold Prize (¥1 million) and Silver Prize (¥500,000). In addition to the money received, the winning novelists get their work published under Dengeki Bunko with the addition of an artist for the illustrated aspects of the light novels. However, if an entry is awarded the Media Works Bunko Prize, the winning novel will be published under ASCII Media Works' Media Works Bunko imprint, along with the author winning ¥1 million. Often, the name of the novel series is changed from what it was originally titled when it won the prize. There are over 5,000 submissions annually since 2011, and it is considered the largest prize for light novels.

== Committee members ==
- Hitoshi Yasuda: Novelist, translator
- Mishio Fukazawa: Novelist
- Kyōichirō Takahata: Novelist
- Tatsuo Satō: The former board chairman of MediaWorks
- Kazutomo Suzuki: The managing editor of Dengeki Bunko

== Prizes ==
| Prizes | Awards (1994–2012) | Awards (2013 on) |
|---|---|---|
| Grand Prize^{[A]} | ¥1 million | ¥3 million |
| Gold Prize^{[A]} | ¥500,000 | ¥1 million |
| Silver Prize^{[A]} | ¥300,000 | ¥500,000 |
| Media Works Bunko Prize^{[D]} | ¥500,000 | ¥1 million |
| Dengeki Bunko Magazine Prize^{[C]} | ¥200,000 | ¥300,000 |
| Honorable Mention^{[B]} | ¥50,000 | |

== Prize winners ==
=== 1994–2007 ===
| # | Year | Participants | Grand Prize | Gold Prize | Silver Prize | |
|---|---|---|---|---|---|---|
| 01 | 1994 | 656 | Gorei Tōshi Ōki Den Gorei Tōshi Genrin! Hiroyuki Domon | Criss Cross: Konton no Maoh; Kyoichiro Takahata | Bōken Phoniness Amurafi - Kaijin Doramu no Hiho; Yuji Nakasato | |
| 01 | 1994 | 656 | Gorei Tōshi Ōki Den Gorei Tōshi Genrin! Hiroyuki Domon | Criss Cross: Konton no Maoh; Kyoichiro Takahata | Kumo Yuki Ayashi, Ame ni Naran ya Ryosuke Tsubota | |
| 02 | 1995 | 566 | Blackrod; Hideyuki Furuhashi | Not awarded | Yamai wa Chikara: Special Man; Naohiro Narishige | |
| 02 | 1995 | 566 | Blackrod; Hideyuki Furuhashi | Not awarded | Koseki Gakari no Yūutsu; Ari Kayamoto | |
| 03 | 1996 | 953 | Not awarded | Panzer Polis 1935; Minoru Kawakami | Horogram Seed; Ayato Miyabi | |
| 03 | 1996 | 953 | Not awarded | Naniwa Sōsinki; Jiro Kurifu | Dark Eyes; Saya Amo | |
| 04 | 1997 | 869 | Boogiepop; Kouhei Kadono | Nekome Gari; Tsumugu Hashimoto | Boku no Chi o Suwanaide; Taro Achi | |
| 05 | 1998 | 996 | Grand Prize | Gold Prize | Silver Prize | Honorable Mention |
| 05 | 1998 | 996 | Not awarded | Gakuen Bugeicho 'Tsuki ni Waraku'; Nobutaka Shirai | Called Gehenna; Gakuto Mikumo | Tsuki to Anata ni Hanataba o Kazuya Shimura |
| 05 | 1998 | 996 | Not awarded | Gakuen Bugeicho 'Tsuki ni Waraku'; Nobutaka Shirai | Called Gehenna; Gakuto Mikumo | Gimmick Heart; Jun Nanami |
| 06 | 1999 | 1,326 | Ringtail Kachi Ikusa no Kimi; Muku Maruyama | Double Breed; Erika Nakamura | Wakagusa Yakyubu Kyosokyoku Submarine Girl; Ginga Isshiki | Not awarded |
| 07 | 2000 | 1,469 | Not awarded | Tengoku ni Namida wa Iranai; Kei Sato | Wizard's Brain; Reiichi Saegusa | Ōdo Rakuga; Akihiko Odo |
| 07 | 2000 | 1,469 | Not awarded | Onmyo no Miyako; Soichiro Watase | Wizard's Brain; Reiichi Saegusa | Tenken Ohki; Miwa Choshiro |
| 08 | 2001 | 1,647 | Daito Fūnki: Rakuyo no Shōjo; Tosei Tamura | Not awarded | Akuma no Mikata; Hisamitsu Ueo | A/B Extreme CASE-314 Emperor; Yashichiro Takahashi |
| 08 | 2001 | 1,647 | Daito Fūnki: Rakuyo no Shōjo; Tosei Tamura | Not awarded | Infinity Zero: Fuyu~white snow Mamizu Arisawa | Kyuketsuki no Oshigoto: The Style of Vampires; Suzu Suzuki |
| 09 | 2002 | 2,080 | Kiri: Shishatachi wa Koya ni Nemuru; Yukako Kabei | Nanahime Monogatari; Wataru Takano | Not awarded | Sharp Edge - stand on the edge Shinichi Sakairi |
| 09 | 2002 | 2,080 | Kiri: Shishatachi wa Koya ni Nemuru; Yukako Kabei | Baccano!: The Rolling Bootlegs; Ryohgo Narita | Not awarded | Sylph Night; Junichi Kamino |
| 10 | 2003 | 2,015 | Shio no Machi: Wish on My Precious; Hiro Arikawa | Wagaya no Oinari-sama. Jin Shibamura | Senpai to Boku; Masashi Okita | Kekkaishi no Fugue; Hazuki Minase |
| 10 | 2003 | 2,015 | Shio no Machi: Wish on My Precious; Hiro Arikawa | Wagaya no Oinari-sama. Jin Shibamura | Senpai to Boku; Masashi Okita | Shupuru no Ohanashi: Grandpa's Treasure Box; Aki Amamiya |
| 11 | 2004 | 2,603 | Ruka: Rakuen no Torawarebitotachi; Hirotaka Nanae | Hikari no Machi: nerim's note Masashi Hasegawa | Kiseki no Hyogen; Mitsutaka Yuki | Serious Rage; Toshiyuki Shirakawa |
| 12 | 2005 | 3,022 | Orusu Banshee; Masatake Ogawa | Kanashimi Chimera; Rei Rairaku | Spice and Wolf; Isuna Hasekura | Tenshi no Recipe; Makura Otogi |
| 12 | 2005 | 3,022 | Orusu Banshee; Masatake Ogawa | Kanashimi Chimera; Rei Rairaku | Hime no Miko; Hikaru Sugii | Tenshi no Recipe; Makura Otogi |
| 13 | 2006 | 2,931 | Mimizuku to Yoru no Ō Izuki Kogyoku | Sekai Heiwa wa Ikka Danran no Ato ni Kazuya Hashimoto | Natsuki Fullswing: Ketsubatto Onna; Warau Natsuki, Hideto Kido | Not awarded |
| 13 | 2006 | 2,931 | Mimizuku to Yoru no Ō Izuki Kogyoku | Tobira no Soto; Shinjirō Dobashi | Natsuki Fullswing: Ketsubatto Onna; Warau Natsuki, Hideto Kido | Not awarded |
| 14 | 2007 | 2,943 | Hōkago Hyakumonogatari; Hirokazu Minemori | Kimi no Tame no Monogatari; Marehito Mikagami | Ikai Nostalgia; Kazuaki Sena | Hazakura ga Kita Natsu; Kōji Natsumi |
| 14 | 2007 | 2,943 | Hōkago Hyakumonogatari; Hirokazu Minemori | Kimi no Tame no Monogatari; Marehito Mikagami | Oshikake Ragnarok; Hyōsuke Takatō | Hazakura ga Kita Natsu; Kōji Natsumi |

=== 2008–2021 ===
| # | Year | Participants | Grand Prize | Gold Prize | Silver Prize | | Dengeki Bunko Magazine Prize | Honorable Mention |
|---|---|---|---|---|---|---|---|---|
| 15 | 2008 | 3,541 | Accel World; Reki Kawahara | Parallel Lovers; Tōka Shigatsu | Tokyo Vampire Finance; Junjō Shindō | | Gankyū Kitan; Tomo Takaha | Kataribe Jinei; Kōzaburō Yamaguchi |
| 15 | 2008 | 3,541 | Accel World; Reki Kawahara | Parallel Lovers; Tōka Shigatsu | Ro-Kyu-Bu! Sagu Aoyama | | Sukima Onna (Habahiro); Hideto Maruyama | Kataribe Jinei; Kōzaburō Yamaguchi |
| # | Year | Total Number of Participants | Grand Prize | Gold Prize | Silver Prize | Media Works Bunko Prize | Dengeki Bunko Magazine Prize | Honorable Mention |
| 16 | 2009 | 4,602 | Bakumatsu Mahoushi -Mage Revolution- Tanabe Souji | Vandal Garougai no Kiseki; Minagawa Mamoru | Goshujin-san & Maid-sama; Enokizu Mudai | (Ei) Amrita; Nozaki Mado | Seiren Sangokushi; Nana Shuuniko | Natsukoi Shigure (Aozora Shigure); Ayasaki Shun |
| 16 | 2009 | 4,602 | Bakumatsu Mahoushi -Mage Revolution- Tanabe Souji | Vandal Garougai no Kiseki; Minagawa Mamoru | Goshujin-san & Maid-sama; Enokizu Mudai | Taiyou no Akubi; Arima Kaoru | Seiren Sangokushi; Nana Shuuniko | Sora no Kanata; Hishida Manabi |
| 17 | 2010 | 4,842 | Shirokuro Necro; Taube Sadato | Seishun Lariat!! SemigawaT akamaru | Hataraku Maou-sama! (originally Maoujou wa Rokujou Hitoma!; The Devil Is a Part-Timer! in English); Wagahara Satoshi | Gyogan Lens; Natsu Asaba | See-through!? Ifusei Amou | Not awarded |
| 17 | 2010 | 4,842 | Shirokuro Necro; Taube Sadato | Idolizing! Hirosawa Sakaki | Anti-literal no Suugaku; Uzuki Yagi | Ocharake! Kuchibaya | See-through!? Ifusei Amou | Not awarded |
| 17 | 2010 | 4,842 | Shirokuro Necro; Taube Sadato | Idolizing! Hirosawa Sakaki | Anti-literal no Suugaku; Uzuki Yagi | Ten'i no Nyōbō; Mutsue Nakamachi | See-through!? Ifusei Amou | Not awarded |
| 18 | 2011 | 5,293 | Escape Speed; Nozomu Kuoka | Anata no Machi no Toshi Denki! Shibai Kineko | Wizard & Warrior With Money; Ghost Mikawa | Shinryaku Kyōshi Seijin UMA; Edward Smith | Ashita kara Orera ga Yatte Kita; Rin Takaki | Minutes: Ichi Bunkan de Sekai o Horobosu Hōhō ni Tsuite; Yomoji Kiono |
| 18 | 2011 | 5,293 | Escape Speed; Nozomu Kuoka | Anata no Machi no Toshi Denki! Shibai Kineko | Yūsha ni wa Katenai; Shirō Kuta | Yamabiko no Iru Mado; Nariko Narita | Ashita kara Orera ga Yatte Kita; Rin Takaki | Minutes: Ichi Bunkan de Sekai o Horobosu Hōhō ni Tsuite; Yomoji Kiono |
| 19 | 2012 | 6,078 | Kijikakushi no Niwa; Mina Sakurai | Ashita, Boku wa Shinu. Kimi wa Ikikaeru. Maru Fuji | Tokyo Soul Withers; Nekotarō Aizen | Tamayura Toori Rinshitsu Yokochō Kana Hyōgu Ten; Naoki Gyōda | Shitsuren Tantei Hyakuse; Saginomiya Misaki | Summer Lancer; Natsuki Amasawa |
| 19 | 2012 | 6,078 | Hello, Mr. Magnum; Matsuri Akaneya | Eco to Tōru to Bukatsu no Jikan; Kokkuri Yanagida | Tokyo Soul Withers; Nekotarō Aizen | Tamayura Toori Rinshitsu Yokochō Kana Hyōgu Ten; Naoki Gyōda | Shitsuren Tantei Hyakuse; Saginomiya Misaki | Summer Lancer; Natsuki Amasawa |
| 20 | 2013 | 6,554 | Zero kara Hajimeru Mahō no Sho; Kakeru Kobashiri | In ga Orinasu Shōkan Mahō; Kimidori | Ōte Keika Tori! Yūichi Aoba | World of Words: Kami wa Sekai o Kijutsu Suru; Minato Jūsan | Kyūshoku Sōdatsusen; Azumi | Mizuki Shigeko-san to Musubaremashita; Masaru Masaka |
| 20 | 2013 | 6,554 | Hakata Tonkotsu Ramens; Saki Kizaki | San-nen B-gumi Nakazaki-kun (kari); Hiroshi Ogawa | Hōkago Waisetsu Kurabu; Keishun Akizaka | World of Words: Kami wa Sekai o Kijutsu Suru; Minato Jūsan | Kyūshoku Sōdatsusen; Azumi | Mizuki Shigeko-san to Musubaremashita; Masaru Masaka |
| 21 | 2014 | n/a | Hitotsu Umi no Pallas Athena; Hatomi Suta | Unmei ni Aisarete Gomennasai; Uwami Kuruma | Retrica Chronicle: Usotsuki wajutsushi to kitsune no shisho Mori Hyuganatsu | Chotto ima kara shigoto yamete kuru Emi Kitagawa | Barrier Cracker; Kyousuke Seki | none |
| 21 | 2014 | n/a | φ no Houseki -Hakuyudou maseki kitan- Shusuke Nitta | Unmei ni Aisarete Gomennasai; Uwami Kuruma | Manga no Kamisama; Kazuyuki Sono; Ideologue! Juzo Shiita | Chotto ima kara shigoto yamete kuru Emi Kitagawa | Barrier Cracker; Kyousuke Seki | none |
| 22 | 2015 | n/a | Tada, Soredake de Yokatta ndesu Ryoya Matsumura | Valhalla no Bangohan -Inoshishi to dragon no kushi ryori- Kazutoshi Mikagami | Retrica Chronicle: Usotsuki wajutsushi to kitsune no shisho | Chocolate Confusion; Hoshisona Natsume | Oretachi! Kiyupikyupi Q pits!! Souta Nadasou | none |
| 22 | 2015 | n/a | Tokyo Shitamachi Gold Crash; Kakuno Makoto | ORESUKI: Are You The Only One Who Loves Me? Rakuda | Koisuru SP busho-kei danshi no mamori kata Asami Yuzuki | Chocolate Confusion; Hoshisona Natsume | Oretachi! Kiyupikyupi Q pits!! Souta Nadasou | none |
| 23 | 2016 | n/a | 86 -eighty six- Asato Asato | Tobakushi wa Inoranai; Sutou Ren | KiraPri Oji-san to Youjo-senpai; Iwasawa Ai | Kinema Tantei Kaleido Mystery; Shasendou Yuuki | none | Olympus no Yuubin Post; Ashino Tamao |
| 23 | 2016 | n/a | Kimi wa Tsukiyo ni Hikarikagayaku; Sano Tetsuya | Tobakushi wa Inoranai; Sutou Ren | Meiji Ayakashi Shinbun: Taida na Kisha no Urakagyou; Satomi Sakura | Kinema Tantei Kaleido Mystery; Shasendou Yuuki | none | Hikikomori no Otouto datta Ashifune Natsu |
| 24 | 2017 | 5,088 | Tata no Mahoutsukai; Wooper | Hello, Hello and Hello; Hazuki Fumi | Sabikui Bisco; Kobukubo Shinji | Yoshiwara Hyakka Hitokuchi no Yume; Enaka Minori | none | Nidaime Soufuutei Haraku-gatari (Hanashi-ka Monogatari ~Asakusa wa Kyou mo Nigiyaka desu~); Basuko (Murase Ken) |
| 24 | 2017 | 5,088 | Garakuta no Ou (Kono Sora no Ue de, Itsumademo Kimi wo Matteiru); Kogarashi Rinne | Sekai no Hate no Random Walker; Saijou You | Sabikui Bisco; Kobukubo Shinji | Yoshiwara Hyakka Hitokuchi no Yume; Enaka Minori | none | Nidaime Soufuutei Haraku-gatari (Hanashi-ka Monogatari ~Asakusa wa Kyou mo Nigiyaka desu~); Basuko (Murase Ken) |
| 25 | 2018 | 4,843 | none | Tsurugi no Kanata; Shibuya Mizuya | Rebellio Machina -"Hakudanshiki" Minazuki no Saikidou- (originally Minazuki no Memory); Misaki Nagi | Fushigi-sou de Yuushoku wo ~Yuurei, Tokidoki Curry Rice~ (originally Dormitory de Yuushoku wo); Muratani Yukari | Oritsuru-hime no Keisan Shigen; Kida Samurou | Au Hi, Hana Saku. Aomino Hai |
| 25 | 2018 | 4,843 | none | Tsurugi no Kanata; Shibuya Mizuya | Kagami no Mukou no Saihate Toshokan: Hikari no Yuusha to Itsuwari no Maou (originally Sekai no Hate de Hajimari wo); Fuyutsuki Irori | Hametsu no Keishisha; Fukui Ken | Oritsuru-hime no Keisan Shigen; Kida Samurou | Donkan Shujinkou ni Narenai Ore no Seishun; Naruse Yui |
| 25 | 2018 | 4,843 | none | Tsurugi no Kanata; Shibuya Mizuya | Kagami no Mukou no Saihate Toshokan: Hikari no Yuusha to Itsuwari no Maou (originally Sekai no Hate de Hajimari wo); Fuyutsuki Irori | Hametsu no Keishisha; Fukui Ken | Oritsuru-hime no Keisan Shigen; Kida Samurou | Mad Bullet Underground (originally Silver Bullet); Nomiya Yuu |
| 26 | 2019 | 4,607 | Seiyū Radio no Ura Omote; Kō Nigatsu | Heat the Pig Liver; Takuma Sakai | Shōjo Negau ni, Kono Sekai wa Kowasubeki ~Tōgenkyō Hōraku~ (originally Shakka Ryōkyō); Kozo Kobayashi | Kokoro wa Kimi o Kakukara (originally Kon'ya, Sekai kara Kono Koi ga Kiete mo) | none | Soshite, Igai ga Inanaku -Shisha-tachi no Tegami- (originally Soshite, Igai ga Inanaku) |
| 26 | 2019 | 4,607 | Seiyū Radio no Ura Omote; Kō Nigatsu | Heat the Pig Liver; Takuma Sakai | Kowareta Sekai no Mukouga wa ~Shōjo-tachi no Disutopia Seizonjutsu~ (originally Tengoku no Rajio) | Kokoro wa Kimi o Kakukara (originally Kon'ya, Sekai kara Kono Koi ga Kiete mo) | none | Ōbāraito - Burisutoru no Gōsuto (originally Gurafiti Tantei - Burisutoru no Gōsuto) |
| 27 | 2020 | 4,355 | Your Forma; Mareho Kikuishi | Guild no Uketsukejō desu ga, Zangyō wa Iya nanode Boss wo Solo Tōbatsu Shiyō to Omoimasu (Uketsuke Jōdesuga, Teiji de Kaeritainode Bosu o Soro Tōbatsu Shiyō to Omoimasu); Mato Kousaka | Bōkyaku no Rakuen Arusenon Kakusei (originally Out Of The Woods); Taki Tsuchiya | Kimi to, Nemuranai Mama Yume o Miru (originally Sorekara ore wa Kakkoī Baiku o Katta) | none | Bokura ga Shinigami ni Inoru hi (originally Mōngāta no Sasayaki ~Ichigo to Sakasa Jūjika~) |
| 27 | 2020 | 4,355 | Your Forma; Mareho Kikuishi | Guild no Uketsukejō desu ga, Zangyō wa Iya nanode Boss wo Solo Tōbatsu Shiyō to Omoimasu (Uketsuke Jōdesuga, Teiji de Kaeritainode Bosu o Soro Tōbatsu Shiyō to Omoimasu); Mato Kousaka | Influence Incident; Kei Shunme | Boku to Ita Natsu o, Kimi ga Wasurenai yō ni. (originally Hajimete no Natsu, Ningyo ni Sasageru Kyanbasu) | none | Bokura ga Shinigami ni Inoru hi (originally Mōngāta no Sasayaki ~Ichigo to Sakasa Jūjika~) |
| 28 | 2021 | 4,411 | Himekishi-sama no Himo; Tōru Shirogane | Kono △ Rabukome wa Shiawase ni Naru Gimu ga Aru. (originally Yuri Shōjo wa Shiawase ni Naru Gimu ga Arimasu) | Mimicry Girls (originally Tokkō Yarō L Team); Hitaki | Kimi wa Yuki o Miru Koto ga Dekinai | none | Tonari no Seki no Yuki Moto-san ga i Sekai de Ōsama Yatterurashī. |
| 28 | 2021 | 4,411 | Himekishi-sama no Himo; Tōru Shirogane | End of Arcadia; Aoi Yūto | Ryūgoroshi no Brunhild; Yuiko Agarizaki | Kimi wa Yuki o Miru Koto ga Dekinai | none | Amalgam Hound Sōsa-kyoku Keiji-bu Tokusō Han (originally Amalgam Hound); Midori Komai |
| 28 | 2021 | 4,411 | Himekishi-sama no Himo; Tōru Shirogane | End of Arcadia; Aoi Yūto | Ryūgoroshi no Brunhild; Yuiko Agarizaki | Kimi wa Yuki o Miru Koto ga Dekinai | none | Yomosugara Seishun Hanashi Shi |

=== 2022–present ===
| # | Year | Total Number of Participants | Grand Prize | Gold Prize | Silver Prize | Media Works Bunko Prize | Dengeki Bunko Magazine Prize | Honorable Mention |
|---|---|---|---|---|---|---|---|---|
| 29 | 2022 | 4,128 | Replica Datte, Koi wo Suru. (originally Doppelgänger wa koi o suru); Harunadon | Miri wa Neko no Hitomi no Naka ni Sundeiru; Shiki Taiga | Kuse Tsuyo i Shuzoku de Gyōretsu ga Dekiru Kekkonsōdansho ~Kanban Neko Musume wa Kawaī dake ja Tsutomaranai~ (originally Marīhausu ni Yōkoso ~Fantajī Sekai no Kekkonsōdansho~) | Sayonara, dare ni mo Aisa Renakatta-sha-tachi e (originally Sai no Kawara Kabushiki Gaisha) | none | Kimi ga Shinitakatta hi ni, Boku wa Kimi o kau koto ni Shita (originally Tōka Shikisai no Saika) |
| 29 | 2022 | 4,128 | Replica Datte, Koi wo Suru. (originally Doppelgänger wa koi o suru); Harunadon | Yūsha Shōkōgun; Rei Ayatsuki | Kuse Tsuyo i Shuzoku de Gyōretsu ga Dekiru Kekkonsōdansho ~Kanban Neko Musume wa Kawaī dake ja Tsutomaranai~ (originally Marīhausu ni Yōkoso ~Fantajī Sekai no Kekkonsōdansho~) | Sayonara, dare ni mo Aisa Renakatta-sha-tachi e (originally Sai no Kawara Kabushiki Gaisha) | none | Kimi ga Shinitakatta hi ni, Boku wa Kimi o kau koto ni Shita (originally Tōka Shikisai no Saika) |
| 30 | 2023 | 4,467 | Witches Can't Be Collared; Yuri Yumemi | Yugami Tachi no Satsujin Dorei; Takana Nanishi | Okusen Crystal; Hisatatsu Nagayama | Zangetsuno Oboegaki Hata Kunihiro Takarakyokushinjū Kaiki Tan; Haruhiko Hadō | none | Bloodstained Princess; Rintaro Hata |
| 30 | 2023 | 4,467 | Rindō no Otome / Watashi no Naka de Eikyū ni Hikaru; Fudaraku | Yugami Tachi no Satsujin Dorei; Takana Nanishi | Kantanna Koto da yo, Itoshii Hito; Yanagisawa | Zangetsuno Oboegaki Hata Kunihiro Takarakyokushinjū Kaiki Tan; Haruhiko Hadō | none | Fyigyua no o Isha-san Nise Mekura no Kimi e Nanamiya Kumataka |
| 30 | 2023 | 4,467 | Rindō no Otome / Watashi no Naka de Eikyū ni Hikaru; Fudaraku | Yugami Tachi no Satsujin Dorei; Takana Nanishi | Kantanna Koto da yo, Itoshii Hito; Yanagisawa | Zangetsuno Oboegaki Hata Kunihiro Takarakyokushinjū Kaiki Tan; Haruhiko Hadō | none | Fukashi no Boku Yori; Akira Ninomae |
| 31 | 2024 | 3,819 | Yōsei no Butsurigaku: Physics Phenomenon Phantom; Denji Kasoketai | Kimi no Denpa ni Noizu wa Iranai; Fumitaka Jingūji | Kaiki! Kyodaina Kame ni Machi o Mita! Seijo to Chinpira to Dekaketsujūjin VS Jaakuna Kuro Gyaru Gundan; Sukeroku Inari | Tarottoru-pu no Natsu; Akika Anezaki | Ake no Sora no Kafuka; Chizuru Mizushina | none |
| 31 | 2024 | 3,819 | Yōsei no Butsurigaku: Physics Phenomenon Phantom; Denji Kasoketai | Kimi no Denpa ni Noizu wa Iranai; Fumitaka Jingūji | Kaiki! Kyodaina Kame ni Machi o Mita! Seijo to Chinpira to Dekaketsujūjin VS Jaakuna Kuro Gyaru Gundan; Sukeroku Inari | Koten Kakuritsu de wa Setsumei Dekinai Futago no Sōkan ya Sore ni Kakawaru Genshō; Azumadouanzu | Ake no Sora no Kafuka; Chizuru Mizushina | none |
| 32 | 2025 | 3,719 | Shinpen Koten Shinjū; Uori | Sayonara Iris Witch; Sanao Morikami | Sajō Meido Senakn Kissa a po Kari Puchu e Yōkoso; Wasan Kurata | Ami, Tokidoki Konpeitō; Hinata Shibano | Kaiji Yūno Musume; Toyoshi Nagatsuki | Angel Fall//Under Shaft; Karuki Tsubasaki |
| 32 | 2025 | 3,719 | Shinpen Koten Shinjū; Uori | Utahime o Koroshitai; Nobu Raishi | Haraguro Hime-sama to Ten'nen Ryu no Ryōko-ki; Kamishiro Okina | Ami, Tokidoki Konpeitō; Hinata Shibano | Kaiji Yūno Musume; Toyoshi Nagatsuki | Kaikon Kuidōraku Kikō; Yuki Kusamori |

== Notes ==
- ^{A} The Grand, Gold, and Silver Prizes were originally the only three prizes offered for the first four rounds between 1994 and 1997.
- ^{B} Honorable mentions were added with the fifth round in 1998 and were originally called the "Special Prize". In the seventh round in 2000, the prize was renamed as "Honorable Mention".
- ^{C} The Dengeki Bunko Magazine Prize was added with the fifteenth round in 2008.
- ^{D} The Media Works Bunko Prize was added with the sixteenth round in 2009.
