= Inukami! =

Japanese light novel series

- Cover of the first light novel volume

いぬかみっ!
- Genre: Fantasy, romantic comedy
- Light novel
- Written by: Mamizu Arisawa
- Illustrated by: Kanna Wakatsuki
- Published by: ASCII Media Works
- Imprint: Dengeki Bunko
- Magazine: Dengeki hp
- Original run: January 2003 – December 2008
- Volumes: 17
- Manga
- Written by: Mamizu Arisawa
- Illustrated by: Mari Matsuzawa
- Published by: ASCII Media Works
- English publisher: NA: Seven Seas Entertainment
- Magazine: Dengeki Comic Gao!
- Original run: October 27, 2005 – February 27, 2008
- Volumes: 6
- Anime television series
- Directed by: Keizō Kusakawa
- Written by: Tsuyoshi Tamai
- Studio: Seven Arcs
- Licensed by: NA: Discotek Media
- Original network: TV Tokyo
- Original run: April 6, 2006 – September 28, 2006
- Episodes: 26
- Video game

Inukami! feat. Animation
- Developer: ASCII Media Works
- Publisher: ASCII Media Works
- Genre: Visual novel
- Platform: Nintendo DS
- Released: December 7, 2006
- Anime film

Inukami! The Movie
- Directed by: Keizō Kusakawa
- Written by: Gō Tamai
- Studio: Seven Arcs
- Licensed by: NA: Discotek Media
- Released: April 21, 2007
- Runtime: 25 minutes

Inukami! (いぬかみっ!; lit. Dog Gods!) is a Japanese light novel series written by Mamizu Arisawa, with illustrations by Kanna Wakatsuki. The series originally started serialization in volume seventeen of ASCII Media Works' now-defunct light novel magazine Dengeki hp on April 18, 2002. Four more chapters were published until the first bound novel of the series was released, though more chapters were later serialized in the magazine. Fourteen main novels, plus two additional bonus novels with illustrations by Mari Matsuzawa, were published by ASCII Media Works under their Dengeki Bunko label between January 10, 2003, and December 10, 2008. The series revolves around a dog goddess named Yōko and her master Keita Kawahira as they fight against various troublesome spirits. Several more inukami besides Yōko also play an important role, most notably the inukami of Kaoru Kawahira.

A manga adaptation by Mari Matsuzawa was serialized in MediaWorks' now-defunct Dengeki Comic Gao! magazine between October 2005 and February 2008. The manga has been licensed by Seven Seas Entertainment for distribution in North America; the first volume was released in November 2008. A twenty-six episode anime adaptation of the series produced by Seven Arcs aired between April and September 2006 on TV Tokyo in Japan. An Internet radio show was also produced, along with a visual novel released by ASCII Media Works, and a twenty-five-minute-long film released in Japanese theaters in April 2007. Another light novel entitled Inukami Special Edition was only released as a promotional gift for the animated film.

The word inukami (いぬかみ) appears to be a corruption of the word inugami (いぬがみ), a type of Japanese spirit that literally means "dog god". The only difference between the two words is the lack of a dakuten in "inukami". A possible reason is that traditional inugami are considered dangerous spirits, more likely to cause harm than help, and are sometimes used to invoke deadly curses.

== Plot ==
Inukami! revolves around Keita Kawahira, a descendant of an Inukami-tamer clan and considered a failure by the clan due to his attitude towards his duty and being unable to find an Inukami to bond with. Inukami, literally "dog god", are benevolent creatures that possess spiritual powers. They are a type of demon with the appearance of a dog who can transform into a human form. Along with a partner from the historic Inukami-tamer clan, they act to obliterate evil and proliferate righteousness. Keita is initially unable to find an Inukami to bond with, but eventually finds a beautiful Inukami named Yoko that decided to become his Inukami, causing Keita to become overjoyed. However, his joy is short-lived when he discovers that she is a very problematic and uncontrollable Inukami. At first Yoko is shown to be selfish and just thinks of herself, to help with this problem Keita's cousin Kaoru sends one of his Inukamis, Nadeshiko, over to help. Keita becomes attracted to Nadeshiko. However, Yoko is thrown into a jealous rage, this is subdued when Keita's grandma's Inukami Hake calms Yoko down stating that Nadeshiko's visit was short and was only here to help Yoko. After Nadeshiko leaves, Yoko grows even closer to Keita although she is annoyed by Keita's flirting with the rest of Kaoru's inukamis when they go to visit.

Things later get heated up when Keita fights a shinigami in order to save the last heir of a wealthy family from death. Yoko ends up beating the shinigami. However, Keita sees what appears to be a large fox where Yoko was fighting, but in the end he blacked out. Towards the end everyone is getting ready to celebrate Keita's grandma's birthday, a special guest who is a giant frog appears looking for Keita, Yoko mistakes him for a perverted frog but learns that the frog's name is Hakusan Meikun. Hakusan, a fallen wizard tells Yoko how he was chosen by Keita and thus became free from a sentence he was serving after making a contract with Keita, in return Hakusan gave him magic abilities. After hearing the story, Yoko becomes jealous and worried that she might get replaced something that is noticed by Nadeshiko. Yoko has a secret hidden and feels guilt, to help with this Nadeshiko suggests confessing to her like she would to Keita with her eyes closed, Yoko agrees and as she is confessing; Nadeshiko slips away and is replaced by Keita who overheard Yoko talking to her. Stunned by seeing Keita by her side which Yoko apologizes to Keita that she did not tell him sooner, something Keita does not care about. Keita states he likes Yoko for Yoko, reminds that he chose her and asks to stay by her side. Overjoyed by what Yoko heard, but takes the confession of love to her, she also confesses that she scared away the other Inukamis who were in fact interested in him when he was looking for one in order to have him all to herself and confesses her love to Keita.

== Media ==
=== Light novels ===
Inukami! began as a series of light novels written by Mamizu Arisawa, and drawn by Kanna Wakatsuki. The series originally started serialization in MediaWorks' now-defunct light novel magazine Dengeki hp with the release of volume seventeen on April 18, 2002. Inukami continued to be serialized in Dengeki hp for another four initial chapters until the release of volume twenty-one of the magazine on December 18, 2002. The following month on January 10, 2003, the first bound volume of the series was published by ASCII Media Works under their Dengeki Bunko publishing label. Volumes continued to be published until December 10, 2008, with the release of the sixteenth novel. Of the volumes, the first fourteen were of the main series, and the fifteenth and sixteenth books, entitled Inukami! EX Wan! and Inukami! EX Wanwan!! respectively, were bonus novels of collected short stories with illustrations provided by Mari Matsuzawa who also drew the Inukami! manga. Another novel entitled Inukami Special Edition was only released as a promotional gift for the animated film. Additional chapters were also serialized in Dengeki hp volumes twenty-three through thirty, thirty-two through thirty-four, and thirty-eight through forty-two. A ten-part original short story compilation is posted online at the anime's official website.

=== Manga ===
A manga adaptation illustrated by Mari Matsuzawa was serialized in the now-defunct shōnen manga magazine Dengeki Comic Gao! between October 27, 2005, and February 27, 2008, published by MediaWorks. The manga chapters were collected into six bound volumes released by ASCII Media Works under their Dengeki Comics publishing label between March 27, 2006, and May 27, 2008. A single-volume anthology titled Inukami! Anthology~ was released by ASCII Media Works on September 27, 2006. The anthology was a collaboration between sixteen artists and manga authors, some of which include: Yukari Higa, Mari Matsuzawa, Suiren Shōfū, Keiichi Sumi, Kanna Wakatsuki, and Yasu. The manga has been licensed by Seven Seas Entertainment for distribution in English in North America; five volumes have been released, the first one being in November 2008. Two omnibus collections were also released in November 2010 and March 2011.

=== Anime ===
An anime adaptation produced by Seven Arcs and directed by Keizō Kusakawa aired on TV Tokyo in Japan between April 6 and September 28, 2006, containing twenty-six episodes. The episodes were released on nine DVD compilations released between August 9, 2006, and April 4, 2007, in limited edition versions, and between October 4, 2006, and June 6, 2007, in regular versions; the first volume contained two episodes, while each of the subsequent volumes contained three episodes. The series is licensed for a February 26, 2019, North American Blu-ray release by Discotek Media.

Shortly after the anime's premiere, a scheduled episode of Inukami! was interrupted by TV Tokyo extending live coverage of the 2006 World Team Table Tennis Championships, which lead an incensed fan of the show to send cremated human remains to TV Tokyo's headquarters.

Four pieces of theme music were used for the anime: one opening theme and three ending themes. The opening theme is "Hikari" (ヒカリ; lit. 'Light') by Yui Horie and the maxi single for the song was released on May 24, 2006. The main ending theme is "Yūjō Monogatari" (友情物語; lit. 'Friendship Story') by Aice^{5}, and the single was released in limited and regular editions also on May 24, 2006. Episode twelve's ending theme is "Kei no Uta" (ケイのうた; lit. 'Kei's Song') by Nana Mizuki, and episode eighteen's ending theme is "Yūjō Monogatari: Danshi (?) Version" (友情物語・男子(?)バージョン; lit. "Friendship Song: Male (?) Version) by Super Zō-sans & Rice^{5}. Seven character song albums were released between January 25 and August 23, 2006, and an additional character vocal album entitled Paradiso was released on December 21, 2006. The anime's first original soundtrack was released on September 21, 2006, and the second followed on November 22, 2006.

An animated film titled Inukami! The Movie: Tokumei Reiteki Sōsakan Karina Shirō! (いぬかみっ! THE MOVIE 特命霊的捜査官・仮名史郎っ!) was produced by Seven Arcs, and directed by Keizō Kusakawa. The film, which only has a runtime of twenty-five minutes, premiered in Japanese theaters on April 21, 2007, as one of the three films released at Dengeki Bunko's Movie Festival, the others being Shakugan no Shana and Kino's Journey. The DVD was released on September 26, 2007, by King Records.

=== Internet radio show ===
An Internet radio show to promote the Inukami! anime series called Inukami! Web Radio: Koinu no Jikan (いぬかみっ! Webラジオ こいぬのじかん; lit. Inukami! Web Radio: Puppy Time) was released through Starchild Net Radio between May 12, 2006, and May 25, 2007, every week on Friday. The program had fifty-five episodes and was hosted by Kaori Nazuka who played Nadeshiko in the anime, and Shizuka Hasegawa who played Tomohane in the anime. The show's theme song was called "Puppy's clock", and the show also used three theme songs from the anime: "Hikari", used as an opening theme in the twenty-seventh broadcast, "Yūjō Monogatari: Danshi (?) Version" used as an ending theme in the twentieth and twenty-seventh broadcasts, and "Yūjō Monogatari" used as an ending theme in all the other broadcasts. The show contained six corners, or parts to the show, and had several guests to the show who were related to the anime's production who include: Mamizu Arisawa, Jun Fukuyama, Yui Horie, Rika Morinaga. A CD containing some of the broadcasts was later sold on January 24, 2007.

=== Visual novel ===
A sound novel, with card game attributes, based on the series was released in limited and regular editions on December 6, 2007, by ASCII Media Works playable on the Nintendo DS; the limited-edition version came bundled with a drama CD. The game is titled Inukami! feat. Animation, and like the title implies, parts of the game are animated. Inukami! is one of the few light novels originally published by ASCII Media Works that has been made into a sound novel under DS Dengeki Bunko, a section of ASCII Media Works which produces sound novels playable on the Nintendo DS based from light novels published under ASCII Media Works' Dengeki Bunko publishing label, and was the third such release.
