= Kōta Nozomi =

Japanese novelist

Kōta Nozomi 望公太
- Born: 1989 (age 36–37); Fukushima Prefecture, Japan
- Occupation: Novelist
- Writing career
- Language: Japanese
- Period: 2011 -
- Genre: Light novel
- Notable work: When Supernatural Battles Became Commonplace
- Notable awards: 5th Novel Japan Gold Award (Boku wa Yappari Kizukanai) (2011); 3rd GA Bunko Award of Excellence (Happy Death Day) (2011)

Kōta Nozomi (望公太, Nozomi Kōta, born 1986) is a Japanese novelist from Fukushima Prefecture. He graduated from Yokohama National University. His original pen name was Taikōbō (太公望).

== Career ==
In February 2011, while attending Yokohama National University, his novel Boku wa Yappari Kizukanai (僕はやっぱり気付かない) won the 5th Novel Japan Gold Prize (now known as HJ Bunko Prize). In April of the same year, his novel Happy Death Day won the 3rd GA Bunko Award of Excellence. Nozomi debuted when Boku wa Yappari Kizukanai (僕はやっぱり気づかない) was published in August later that year. Happy Death Day would also be published the next month under the name Happy Death Day Jisatsuya Yomiji to Satsujinki Dorian (Happy Death Day 自殺屋ヨミジと殺人鬼ドリアン).

In the afterword of Happy Death Day, Nozomi wrote that even though Boku wa Yappari Kizukanai was released first, Happy Death Day was the first novel he ever wrote.

In 2012, he graduated from Yokohama National University, and in June of the same year, the first volume of When Supernatural Battles Became Commonplace was released. This series would later be adapted to an audio drama in May 2013, a manga in July 2013, and then an anime in October 2014.

== Notable works ==
- Boku wa Yappari Kizukanai (僕はやっぱり気づかない) (Illustrated by Takatsuki Ichi, published by HJ Bunko, 6 volumes, 2011–2012)
- Happy Death Day (Illustrated by Akira Banpai, published by GA Bunko, 2 volumes, 2011)
- When Supernatural Battles Became Commonplace - Inō-Batoru wa Nichijō-kei no Naka de. (異能バトルは日常系のなかで) (Illustrated by 029, published by GA Bunko, 13 volumes, 2012–2018) Publishing in English by J-Novel Club.
- Uchi no Class no Tayorinai Last Boss (うちのクラスの頼りないラスボス) (Illustrated by Kurō Nibiiro, published by HJ Bunko, 2 volumes, 2013)
- Kuroki Eiyū no Wanta One Turn Kill! (黒き英雄の一撃無双(ワンターンキル)) (Illustrated by Yūnagi, published by HJ Bunko, 7 volumes, 2013–2016)
- Ikai Shinki to no Reunion (異界神姫との再契約(リユニオン)) (Illustrated by Meronto Mari, published by GA Bunko, 2 volumes, 2014–2015)
- Aisare World -I really, truly surrender to you.- (アイサレワールド -I really, truly surrender to you.- 冬美原久真部の解決日誌1) (Illustrated by Mika Pikazo, published by HJ Novels, 1 volume, 2015)
- Jaiantokiringu no Dark Hero (最強喰いのダークヒーロー) (Illustrated by Heirō, published by GA Bunko, 3 volumes, 2016–2017)
- Light Novel Pro! (ラノベのプロ) (Illustrated by Shirabii, published by Fujimi Fantasia Bunko, 2 volumes, 2016–2017)
- Saiaku Tantei (最悪探偵) (Illustrated by Yūki Kodama, published by Novel Zero, 2017)
- Isekai Tennis Musō (異世界テニス無双) (Illustrated by Yūnagi, published by GA Bunko, 2018)
- Are You Okay With a Slightly Older Girlfriend? - Choppiri Toshiue demo Kanojo ni shite kuremasu ka? (ちょっぴり年上でも彼女にしてくれますか？) (Illustrated by Meruchi Nanase, published by GA Bunko, 6 volumes, May 2018 - June 2020) Published in English by J-Novel Club.
- Shindō Yūsha to Maid Onesan (神童勇者とメイドおねえさん) (Illustrated by Pyon Kichi, published by MF Bunko J, 4 volumes, 2019 -)
- Seiharu Days ~Danshikōkō no Sei no Shinrisen (性春デイズ 〜男子高校生の性の心理戦〜) (Illustrated by Nitaka, published by LINE Bunko Edge, 1 volume, 2019)
- You Like Me, Not My Daughter?! - Musume jyanakute Mama ga Suki nano!? (娘じゃなくて私(ママ)が好きなの!?) (Illustrated by Giuniu, published by Dengeki Bunko, 7 volumes, 2019–2022)
- Kimitte Watashi no Koto Suki Nandesho? Toriaezu Otameshi de Tsukiattemiru? (きみって私のこと好きなんでしょ？とりあえずお試しで付き合ってみる？) (Illustrated by Azuri Hinata, published by GA Bunko, 2 volumes, 2020)
- Motokano tono Jirettai Gisōkekkon (元カノとのじれったい偽装結婚) (Illustrated by Pyon Kichi, published by MF Bunko J, 2 volumes, 2021)
