= Nishida =

Nishida (西田; lit. "west rice field") is a Japanese surname. Notable people with the surname include:

== People ==
- Atsuko Nishida (西田 敦子), Japanese graphic artist who designed Pikachu
- Atsutoshi Nishida (西田 厚聰; 1943–2017), Japanese business executive
- Go Nishida (西田 剛; born 1986), Japanese footballer
- Goro Nishida (西田 吾郎; 1943–2014), Japanese mathematician
- Hikaru Nishida (西田 ひかる; born 1972), Japanese singer and actress
- Jane Nishida (born 1955), American lawyer and government official
- Jun Nishida (西田 潤; 1977–2005), Japanese ceramicist
- Junko Nishida (西田 順子; born 1915), Japanese high jumper
- Katsuo Nishida (西田 勝男; 1929–2001), Japanese long-distance runner
- Ken Nishida (西田 健; born 1945), Japanese actor and voice actor
- Kitaro Nishida (西田 幾多郎; 1870–1945), Japanese philosopher, founder of the Kyoto School of philosophy
- Mai Nishida (西田 麻衣; born 1989), Japanese gravure idol, tarento, and actress
- Makoto Nishida (西田 実仁; born 1962), Japanese politician
- Masayoshi Nishida (西田 正義; born 1966), Japanese anime director
- Masujiro Nishida (西田 満寿次郎), Japanese footballer and manager
- Naomi Nishida (西田 尚美; born 1972), Japanese actress
- Nishida Shun'ei (西田 俊英; born 1953), Japanese painter
- Nozomi Nishida (西田 望見; born 1990), Japanese voice actress and singer
- Reo Nishida (西田 玲雄; born 2000), Japanese diver
- Rikuu Nishida (西田 陸浮; born 2001), Japanese baseball player
- Seishirō Nishida (西田 聖志郎; born 1955), Japanese actor
- Shogo Nishida (西田 祥吾; born 1982), Japanese fencer
- Shoji Nishida (西田 昌司; born 1958), Japanese politician
- Shuhei Nishida (西田 修平; 1910–1997), Japanese pole vaulter
- Takayuki Nishida (西田 隆維; born 1977), Japanese long-distance runner
- Takuya Nishida (西田 拓也; born 1991), Japanese shogi player
- Tatsuo Nishida (西田 龍雄; 1928–2012), Japanese linguist
- Toshisada Nishida (西田 利貞; 1941–2011), Japanese primatologist
- Toshiyuki Nishida (西田 敏行; born 1947), Japanese actor
- Yoshimi Nishida (西田 祥実; 1892–1944), Japanese general
- Yuji Nishida (西田 有志; born 2000), Japanese volleyball player
- Yuka Nishida (西田 優香; born 1985), Japanese judoka

== Fictional characters ==
- Satono Nishida (爾子田 里乃), a character in Hidden Star in Four Seasons from the video game series Touhou Project
