= Yashichiro Takahashi =

Japanese novelist

Yashichiro Takahashi (高橋 弥七郎, Takahashi Yashichirō) is a Japanese novelist best known for the creation of the Shakugan no Shana series. Shakugan no Shana was adapted into a radio drama, manga, anime, and a video game. In addition, it was adapted into an anime film on April 21, 2007. Takahashi also made another series titled A/B Extreme, which won Honorable mention in the eighth Dengeki Novel Prize. Most of his work includes references to the tokusatsu Choukou Senshi Changéríon (超光戦士シャンゼリオン, Choukou Senshi Changèrion).

== Works ==
- A/B Extreme (2002–2004)
  - A/B Extreme - CASE-314 Emperor
  - A/B Extreme - Mask of Nicolaus
  - A/B Extreme - Dream of Abraxas
- Shakugan no Shana (2002–2023)
  - 22 main novels and 5 short story collections
- Kanae no Hoshi (2014-2015)

Others

- Bludgeoning Angel Dokuro-Chan desu (collective writing)
- K (collective writing, anime scriptwriter)
- Atelier Ryza: Ever Darkness & the Secret Hideout (scenario writer)
- Atelier Ryza: Ever Darkness & the Secret Hideout (anime scriptwriter)
- Ayaka: A Story of Bonds and Wounds (anime scriptwriter)
