= Dengeki Bunko =

Japanese publishing imprint

- Native name: 電撃文庫
- Type: Subsidiary
- Founded: June 1993; 33 years ago, in Japan
- Headquarters: Japan
- Products: Published titles
- Parent: ASCII MediaWorks
- Subsidiaries: Dengeki Café; Dengeki Records; Dengeki Games; Dengeki Clothing
- Website: dengekibunko.jp (in Japanese)

Dengeki Bunko (電撃文庫) is a publishing imprint affiliated with the Japanese publishing company ASCII Media Works (a division of Kadokawa Future Publishing formerly called MediaWorks). It was established in June 1993 with the publication of Hyōryū Densetsu Crystania volume one, and is a light novel imprint aimed at a male audience. The editors in charge of this imprint have a reputation for welcoming new authors, and hold a yearly contest, the Dengeki Novel Prize, to discover new talent. The eighth volume of Kino's Journey, originally published in October 2004, was Dengeki Bunko's 1,000th published novel. As of September 2010, Dengeki Bunko has published over 2,000 light novels; the 2,000th novel was volume one of Yuyuko Takemiya's Golden Time. Several publications from Dengeki Bunko were later adapted into anime series, including Kino's Journey, Shakugan no Shana, A Certain Magical Index and Sword Art Online among others. After MediaWorks' light novel magazine Dengeki hp was discontinued, a new magazine entitled Dengeki Bunko Magazine succeeded it. In April 2013, the imprint celebrated their 20th anniversary with an exhibition.

== Published titles ==
=== !–9 ===
Title	Author	Illustrator	No. of volumes
@Home	Yū Fujiwara	Masato Yamane	3
108 Seiden: Tenpa Mugen no Valkyria	Kadō Ōmi	Denki Mirai	2
12Demons	Akihiko Odo	Masatoshi Takeshi	2
5656!	Ryohgo Narita	Suzuhito Yasuda	1
6: Sechs	Rei Rairaku	Cosmic	1
86	Asato Asato	Shirabii	11
9S	Tohru Hayama	Yamato Yamamoto	11

=== A ===
Title	Author	Illustrator	No. of volumes
A/B Extreme	Yashichiro Takahashi	Eiji Kaneda (vol. 1, 2), Nagi (vol. 3)	3
A Black Knight × A Thorn of Rose	Tosei Tamura	Aoi Yukino	1
Absolute Boy	Tatsuya Hamazaki	Sunaho Tobe	2
Accel World	Reki Kawahara	Hima	25
Adachi to Shimamura	Hitoma Iruma	Non	8
Aerial City	Minoru Kawakami	Kōji Nakakita	1
After School Black Arts	Rin Suzuki	Yomi Sarachi	3
Agartha Fiesta!	Makoto Sanda	Double Dragon	4
Aihara Yorunami wa Yoku Nureru	Hazuki Minase	Eiri Shirai	2
Aisaka Suteki na Shōkōgun	Hazuki Minase	Sakana Tōjō	3
Aisuru Musume kara no Kyōikuteki Shidō	Ion Aioi	Hika	1
Akairo / Romance	Yū Fujiwara	Kaya Kuramoto	6
Akamurasaki Aoko no Bunseki Detarame	Ikkei Jukkaidō	Eito Shimotsuki	2
Aka no 9-ban (Reijū)	Akira Aihara	Kazuoki	1
Ākuma Detekūru	Taro Achi	Muto Kurihito	1
Akuma no Mikata (and Akuma no Mikata 666 series)	Hisamitsu Ueo	Kaori Fujita	19
Alice	Yasuhiro Kawasaki	Katsumi Enami	1
Alice Reloaded	Matsuri Akaneya	Unagi Kabayaki	3
Allison	Keiichi Sigsawa	Kohaku Kuroboshi	4
Ame no Hi no Iris	Takeshi Matsuyama	Hirasato	1
Anata ga Naku made Fumu no o Yamenai! (and Anata ga Fumu made Naku no o Yamenai!!)	Eiji Mikage	Nyanya	2
Anata no Machi no Toshi Denki!	Shibai Kineko	Urabi	3
And you thought there is never a girl online?	Shibai Kineko	Hisasi	10
Anime Alive	Mizuki Akikasa	Wadapen	1
Another Beat	Natsuki Sawara	Osamu Otani	1
Anti-literal Alchenist	Yagi Uzuki	Tomoe Sasamori	5
Aoi-kun to Schrödinger no Kanojotachi	Nanami Wataki	Mogumo	1
Ao no Corsair	Sadato Taube	Nyoro	1
Ao to Kuro no Kyōkaisen	Mizuki Kuraku	Maruino	1
Ariel	Yū Ueno	Uni	3
Arikawa Yuna no Teikōchi	Yui Tokita	Richu	1
Arisa Change Ring	Nakazato Yuji	Umekichi	1
Aruhi, Bakudan ga Ochitekite	Hideyuki Furuhashi	Yukari Higa	1
Asaoka Hiyori no Dokidoki Karte	Yui Tokita	Ōki Takei	2
Ashita, Boku wa Shinu. Kimi wa Ikikaeru.	Maru Fuji	H_{2}SO_{4}	4
Ashita kara Orera ga Yatte Kita	Rin Takaki	Gin	2
Astral	Takafumi Nanatsuki	Tomozo	2
Asura Cryin'	Gakuto Mikumo	Nao Watanuki	14
Atrium no Koibito	Shinjirō Dobashi	Ryō Ueda	3
A=Uchū Shōjo^{2}×Tamashii no Sokudo	Hifumi Hino	Comeco Amajio	1

=== B ===
Title	Author	Illustrator	No. of volumes
Babel	Akira Nakata	Hitowa	1
Babel Stars	Shūgo Nasaka	Kobashiko	1
Baberonika Trial	Chōshirō Miwa	Haruaki Fuyuno	1
Baby Princess	Sakurako Kimino	Natsuki Mibu	7
Baccano!	Ryohgo Narita	Katsumi Enami	22
Bakumatsu Mahōshi	Sōji Tanabu	Kaya Kuramoto	3
Ballad of a Shinigami (and Ballad of a Shinigami: Unknown Stars and Ballad of a Shinigami: Rebirth)	K-Ske Hasegawa	Nanakusa	16
Banish Drops	Masaki Okayu	Risō Maeda	1
Barrier Cracker	Kyōnosuke Kakoi	KeG	2
Bedroom de Meshiagare	Rin Suzuki	Shugasuku	2
Bishōjo ga Ōsugite Ikite Ikenai	Rokugatsu Ashiyashi	Yukio	2
Bishōjo to wa, Kiru Koto to Mitsuketari	Hitoma Iruma	Coffee Kizoku	1
Bitter×Sweet Blood	Tsukasa Suou	Chiyoko	2
Black Bullet	Shiden Kanzaki	Saki Ukai	7
Black Rod	Hideyuki Furuhashi	Keita Amamiya (vol.1), Yoshinori Ito (vol.2), Shigeki Maeshima (vol.3)	3
Black Santa to Reindeer	Kazuki Izumiya	Shiromiso	1
Blood Eyes	Matsuri Akaneya	Shiromiso	1
Bloom Into You: Regarding Saeki Sayaka	Hitoma Iruma	Nio Nakatani	3
Bludgeoning Angel Dokuro-Chan	Masaki Okayu	Torishimo	11
Boku ni Otsukisama o Misenai de	Taro Achi	Sumi Miya	10
Boku no Chi o Suwanai de	Taro Achi	Sumi Miya	5
Boku no Sekai o Mamoru Hito	Nagaru Tanigawa	Akifumi Orizawa	3
Boku o Koppidoku Kirau S-kyū Bishōjo wa Gēmu Sekai de Boku no Shinja	Akira Aihara	Chisato Kobayashi	1
Boku to Kanojo no Game Sensō	Tōru Shiwasu	Jin Happōbi	10
Boku to Majo shiki Apocalypse	Hazuki Minase	Fujiwara Warawara	3
Boku wa Kanojo no 9-banme	Shinano Sano	Takahiro Tsurusaki	1
Bokura wa Mahō Shōjo no Naka	Eiji Mikage	Eihi	2
Boogiepop series	Kouhei Kadono	Kouji Ogata	20
Buster-Do!	Miroku Kobayashi	TwinBox	2
Buta no Liver wa Kanetsu Shiro	Takuma Sakai	Asagi Tōsaka	5

=== C ===
Title	Author	Illustrator	No. of volumes
C³	Hazuki Minase	Sasorigatame	17
Called Gehenna	Gakuto Mikumo	Shoryu Shinobu	5
Catch the Sign!	Masashi Hasegawa	Shiryu Sakurai	1
Chiang-Rai Express	Akimaru Hyappa	Kan Okeya	2
Chibitomo!	Hajime Nakamura	Color	2
Chiisana Kuni no Kyuseishu	Kazuyuki Takami	Himeaki	5
Chiisana Majo to Soratobu Kitsune	Daisuke Minai	Ashito Ōyari	1
Chōhōwa Second Braves	Junpei Monogusa	Kochimo	1
Chrono × Sex × Complex	Yukako Kabei	Densō	3
Clockwork Serpents	Kouhei Kadono	Kouji Ogata	1
Closed Seven	Kaede Asamiya	Mami Surada	2
Colosseum	Shinjirō Dobashi	Yukiko Horiguchi	3
Cooking On!	Jirō Kurifu	Yasuyuki Shuri	2
Cool Down	Masanori Date	Kouji Ogata	1
Criss Cross Konton no Maō	Kyoichiro Takahashi	Rin Kigawa	1
Cross Talk	Rei Rairaku	Kouji Ogata	1
Crystal Communication	Yukiya Akatsuki	Poporucha	1
Custom Child	Yukako Kabei	Jiro Suzuki	1
Cyan no Yūutsu na Jū	Natsuki Sawara	Nishida	1

=== D ===
Title	Author	Illustrator	No. of volumes
D9: Seihitsu no Akuma Sōsha	Yū Ueno	Kokonoka	3
D.H.A. (and D.H.A. Herisshu spin-off)	Rin Yuki	Yuta Komiya	10
Daddyface	Masanori Date	Nishida	7
Danjo no Yūjō wa Seiritsu Suru? (Iya, Shinai!!)	Nana Nanana	Parum	5
Danshi Kōkōsei de Urekko Light Novel Sakka o Shiteiru Keredo, Toshishita no Classmate de Seiyū no Onnanoko ni Kubi o Shimerareteiru.	Keiichi Sigsawa	Kōhaku Kuroboshi	3
Danshō no Grimm	Gakuto Coda	Kakeru Mikazuki	17
Danzai no Regalia	Sadato Taube	Super Zombie	2
Dare mo Oshiete Kurenakatta Mushoku kara Eiyū no Nakama no Shōnin ni Naru Hōhō	Takamaru Semikawa	Popqn	1
Dare mo Osoreru Ano Iinchō ga, Boku no Senzoku Maid ni Naru Yō desu	Masaki Okayu	Osa	2
Daten no Shiren	Tsukasa Kōzuki	Matsuri Santa	3
Defender	Chiaki Konaka		1
Dengeki Aegis 5	Nagaru Tanigawa	Nao Goto	2
Denpa Onna to Seishun Otoko	Hitoma Iruma	Buriki	8
Denshi Mahōtsukai no Tronica	K-Ske Hasegawa	Inko Horiizumi	1
Desire Ōkoku Monogatari	Hisashi Suzuki	Toru Azumi	6
The Devil Is a Part-Timer!	Satoshi Wagahara	029	27
Disgaea: Hour of Darkness	Junna Akikura	Takehito Harada	1
Dokkoida?!	Taro Achi	Yu Yagami	6
Dokuhaki-hime to Hoshi no Ishi	Izuki Kōgyoku	Hiroo Isono	1
Dokusō Tanpen series	Mado Nosaki	Shizuki Morii	2
Doll Masters	Tsutomu Satō	Tarou2	3
Double Breed	Erika Nakamura	Kazune Fujikura (vol. 1, 2), Takehito (vol. 3-)	11
Double Cast	Kyoichiro Takahashi	Yu Kinutani	2
Dragonbuster	Mizuhito Akiyama	Hiro Fujishiro	2
Dream Knocker	Mikage	Sana Wakatsuki	1
Duel Eraser	Yoshino Origuchi	Kurogin	3
Duan Surk (and Duan Surk II sequel)	Mishio Fukazawa	Sunaho Tobe	24
Dusty Vampire Girl	Tarō Achi	Isll	3
Durarara!!	Ryohgo Narita	Suzuhito Yasuda	18

=== E ===
Title	Author	Illustrator	No. of volumes
E.a.G	Jin Shibamura	Nari	1
Earthtia Chronicle series	Shota Asuka	Aya Kadoi	4
Eco to Tōru series	Kokkuri Yanagida	Macco	2
E.G. Combat	Mizuhito Akiyama	Yoshimiru	3
Elf Yome to Hajimeru Isekai Ryōshu Seikatsu: Ore no Sumu Shima ni Isekai ga Kichattandaga	Daijin Washinomiya	Nardack	1
The Empty Box and the Zeroth Maria	Eiji Mikage	Tetsuo (credited as "415" in the first volume)	7
End Blue	Hitoma Iruma	Nio Nakatani	1
Erabaresugi Shimono!	Hirokazu Minemori	Shin Kyōgoku	3
Eromanga Sensei	Tsukasa Fushimi	Hiro Kanzaki	6
Escape Speed	Nozomu Kuoka	Gin	8
Etsusa Ōhashi	Ryohgo Narita	Suzuhito Yasuda	4
Even a Replica Can Fall in Love	Harunadon	raemz	4
Extracurricular Survival Methods	Hazuki Minase	Ponzu Yūkyū	3

=== F ===
Title	Author	Illustrator	No. of volumes
F	Shin-ichi Sakairi	Nagi	2
F-rank no Bōkun	Eiji Mikage	Sunao Minakata	2
Fafner of the Azure	Tow Ubukata	Hisashi Hirai	1
Fate/strange fake	Ryōgo Narita	Shizumi Morii	3
Fighting Witch	Kadō Ōmi	Matarō	1
Figure 17	Shoji Yonemura	Yuriko Chiba	1
Flag Breaker	Ryūnosuke Kuromiya	Harikamo	2
Fortune Quest series	Mishio Fukazawa	Natsumi Mukai	50
Full Scale Summer	Hiroshi Nagashima	Benio	1
Fushiawase nara Te o Tsunagō!	Tensei Hibiki	Shunsuke Tagami	1
Fūshin Saiban	Ryōto Takama	Yoshie Katō	2
Futsuma Gakuen no Mitralka	Ghost Mikawa	Ukyo rst	4
Fuwafuwa-san ga Furu	Hitoma Iruma	Loundraw	1

=== G ===
Title	Author	Illustrator	No. of volumes
Gaikotsu Knife de Jump	Taro Achi	Sumi Miya	4
Gakkō o Deyō	Nagaru Tanigawa	Masao Aonama	6
Gakuen Onmyōji	Obana Kurokitsune	Ukai Saki	1
Gakusei Shōjo	Hikaru Sugii	Mel Kishida	4
Gekitotsu no Hexennacht	Minoru Kawakami	Satoyasu	2
Gekitsui Majo Himika	Yuki Oginome	Otozuku Konoe	3
Gekkō	Natsuo Mamiya	Shiromiso	1
Gendai Nihon ni Yattekita Sega no Megami ni Arigachi na Koto	Tōru Shiwasu	Kei	2
Genso Suikoden	Shinjiro Hori, Miho Takase et al.	Kaori Fujita et al.	17
Genwaku no Divine Doll	Akira Yumezawa	Chikotamu	1
Gifted	Shūichi Jimaru	Ryō@Ryō	2
Ginga Kankō Ryokan Sora no Yu he Irasshāi!	Ryuji Arai	Nankotsu Misakura	7
Gin'iro Fuwari	Mamizu Arisawa	Fue	1
Gin'iro no Olynssis	Hitomi Amamiya	Hisashi Hirai	1
Ginkō Kishidan	Hisashi Suzuki	Tamago no Kimi	1
Gintsuchi no Alexandra	Yū Ueno	Jin Isenoya	2
Girl Game Master Shiina (and Retro Game Master Shibusawa)	Tsukasa Suō	Nao Saeki	6
Girly Air Force	Kōji Natsumi	Asagi Tōsaka	11
Gokudō-kun Man-yūki Gaiden	Usagi Nakamura	Takeru Kirishima	10
Golden Time	Yuyuko Takemiya	Eeji Komatsu	11
Gosenfu Nante Kazari desu!	Ginga Isshiki	Wingheart	1
Goshujin-sama wa Yamaneko-hime	Kazuyuki Takami	Ayumu Kasuga	13
Goshujin-san & Maid-sama	Mudai Enokizu	Sōryū	2
Grimoire no Keiyakusha	Hideto Kido	Yūgen	2
Growlanser	Mie Takase (vol. 1-3), Saya Amo (vol. 4)	Satoshi Urushihara	4
Guild no Uketsukejou desu ga, Zangyou wa Iya nanode Boss wo Solo Toubatsu Shiyou to Omoimasu	Mato Kousaka	Gaou	6
Gunparade March series (and Gunparade Orchestra series)	Ryosuke Sakaki	Junko Kimura	15
Gun's Heart	Kazuyuki Takami	Koto Aoiro	5
Guns and Magic	Nobuori Nagata	Neko Megane	2
Gura Shachi	Erika Nakamura	Sō	1

=== H ===
Title	Author	Illustrator	No. of volumes
Hai, Kochira Tantei-bu desu	Kōichi Nitadori	Yoshi Wo	2
Hajimete no Kusogee	Kaede Asamiya	Nemunemu	1
Hakoniwa Fools	Plus Sasayama	Ebira	2
Hakugai Fukutsu no Blade Maker	Ikubiyo Amoh	Momo Hinata	2
Hallelujah Vamp	Kōzaburō Yamaguchi	Gaō	3
Hana × Hana	Hiroki Iwata	Ryōka	8
Hanayashiki Sumika no Seichijunrei	Yūsaku Igarashi	Futaba Sanrin	2
Hanbun no Tsuki ga Noboru Sora	Tsumugu Hashimoto	Keiji Yamamoto	8
Hangyaku no Dreadnought	Hiroki Iwata	Sakura Shiromochi	4
Hanikami Triangle	Yusaku Igarashi	Mizuki	7
Hannin ga Wakarimasun	Noboru Kuronuma	Shikibu Fusataka	1
Harem wa Iya!!	Marehito Mikagami	Piromizu	2
Hazakura ga Kita Natsu	Kōji Natsumi	Shizuki Morii	5
Heavy Object	Kazuma Kamachi	Ryō Nagi	20
Heian Onihime Sōshi	Obana Kurokitsune	Yomi Sarachi	1
Heisa Gakuen no Rebellion	Kurage Terada	Cha-colate	1
Hello, Genius	Kazuhiro Yūki	Nylon	3
Hen Ai Psychedelic	Natsuo Mamiya	Shiromiso	2
Higaeri Gladiator	Erika Nakamura	Kengo Konno	1
Higashi-Ikebukuro Stray Cats	Hikaru Sugii	Kurodeko	1
Hikōnin Mahō Shōjo Sensen	Kisui	Bun150	3
Himitsu Kessha to Rule to Koi	Kurage Terada	Nauribon	1
Hinata bashi no Ghost pain	Sho Arisawa	Kaori Minamikami	1
Hitomishiri-bu wa Kenzen desu	Shinano Sano	Saji Sasai	2
Hitotsu no Tairiku no Monogatari	Keiichi Sigsawa	Kohaku Kuroboshi	2
Hitotsu Umi no Pallas Athena	Suta Hatomi	Torocchi	3
Hōkago Gentei Yūsha-sama	Hirotaka Nanae	Nan Yaegashi	2
Hōkago Hyakumonogatari	Hirokazu Minemori	Shin Kyogoku	10
Hōkago no Fairytale	Tomonori Sugihara	Meguru Adachi	1
Hōkago Ren'ai-bu!	Rin Mitsuki	Shiro	1
Horizon in the Middle of Nowhere	Minoru Kawakami	Satoyasu	23
Hyper Hybrid Organization	Kyoishiro Takahashi	Yu Aikawa	6

=== I ===
Title	Author	Illustrator	No. of volumes
Ichijō Hunters Office	Ken Harubato	Sarugoru	1
I.d.	Gakuto Mikumo	Kazuo Miyamura	3
Ideologue!	Jūsan Shiida	Hagure Yūki	4
Idol ≒ Vampire	Tsukasa Kōzuki	Tarō Amagai	2
Idol wa Tsukkomareru no ga Suki!	Masato Saitō	Sakana	10
Idolising!	Sakaki Hirozawa	Cuteg	4
Ihō no Tankyūsha: Histoire Étranger	Somamichi Narita	Shiromiso	1
Imadoki, Jochū de Hōkō	Meidai Kasai	Jun Futaha	1
Imōto Home	Sorajūrō Kashiwaba	Satoru Arikawa	2
Infinity Zero	Mamizu Arisawa	Hajime Ninomiya	4
In ga Orinasu Shōkan Mahō	Hideaki Mashiroya	x6suke	3
Inside World	Tsukasa Suou	En Morikura	1
Intelli Village no Zashikiwarashi	Kazuma Kamachi	Mahaya	9
Inukami!	Mamizu Arisawa	Kanna Wakatsuki	16
Irisu no Niji	Takafumi Nanatsuki	Katsuyuki Hirano	2
Iriya no Sora, UFO no Natsu	Mizuhito Akiyama	Eeji Komatsu	4
Iruka-ryō no Shōjo-tachi wa Koi Dekinai	Mitsuhiko Tatsukawa	Pikazo	2
Iscariot	Makoto Sanda	Robin Kishiwada	7
Isekai Kanrinin Kudō Kōtarō	Suzu Suzuki	Saori Toyota	2
Isekai kara no Hitotsubu no	Ikkei Jyukaidō	Kihiro Yuzuki	1
Itanjitachi no Hōkago	Saki Katashiro	Eiji Usatsuka	1
Itsuka, Koi Machi!	Masashi Hasegawa	Sakusaku	1
Itsumo Dokodemo Nin 2 Ninja	Taro Achi	Sumi Miya	6
Itsuwari no Dragoon	En Mikami	You Shiina	5
Iya ni Naru Hodo Himiko na Yankee	Akira Aihara	Airi Hori	2

=== J ===
Title	Author	Illustrator	No. of volumes
Jaja Hime Buyūden	Usagi Nakamura		2
Jii-chan Jet! (and Jii-chan Jet!! Honey Bunny spin off)	K-Ske Hasegawa	Asaha Oka	2
Jikū no Cross Road	Kazuyuki Takami	Anmitsusou	7
Jōgasaki Nao to Dengeki Bunko Sakka ni Naru Tame no 10 no Method	Yūsaku Igarashi	Suien	2
Joshi Kōsei no Seibun	Keisuke Hasegawa	Yua	1
Jūgo Doki Doki Project!	Taro Achi	Takashi Tensug	2
Jūnana-banme no Higgs	Ryū Hirosaki	Kihiro Yuzuki	1
Jūsanbanme no Alice	Tsukasa Fushimi	Sikorsky	4
Jūsan Mujun no Solverknight	Ikkei Jukkaidō	Hinasaki	2
Just Boiled O'clock	Hisamitsu Ueo	Kaori Fujita	1

=== K ===
Title	Author	Illustrator	No. of volumes
Kaguya	Hajime Kamoshida	Kumiko Aoi	5
Kaguya Nikki	Tensei Hibiki	Masakazu Azuma	1
Kaijin no Cardinal Red	Nishi Nishimura	Kuroneko	3
Kakure Hime	Akira Satake	Hōki Kusano	2
Kakusei Idenshi	Hajime Nakamura	Refeia	3
Kakusei Love Survivor	Takeru Sunamori	Umetarō	1
Kakute Yoake no Daybreaker	Chūi	Shirabii	3
Kaleidoscope no Mukōgawa	Yuei Miki	Puyo	2
Kami no Manimani!	Kōzaburō Yamaguchi	Tobari Amakusa	3
Kaminaki Sekai no Eiyuden	Hajime Kamoshida	Minezi Sakamoto	3
Kaminaki Sekai no Tormenter	Yūki Nishina	Nyoro	1
Kamioroshi	Akihiko Odō	Yomi Sarachi	2
Kami-sama no Iutōri!	Yu Nishimura	Show	1
Kami-sama no Memo-chō	Hikaru Sugii	Meru Kishida	9
Kami to Dorei no Tanjō Syntax	Bokuto Uno	Kikurage	3
Kanae no Hoshi	Yashichiro Takahashi	Noizi Ito	2
Kanashimi Kimera	Rei Rairaku	Mio Yanagihara	4
Kane wa Kanojo no Mawarimono	Yui Tokita	Hiiro	1
Kangoku Gakkō nite Monban o	Yakuji Furumiya	Yasumo	3
Kannō Shōsetsu o Kaku Onna no Ko wa Kirai desu ka?	Mitsuhiko Tatsukawa	Nana	5
Kanojo no Unmei Game-kei	Akira Aihara	Isll	1
Kanojo to Kare to Minna no Hōsō		Cuon	1
Kanojo wa Idenshi Kumikae Kei	Io Saga	Refeia	1
Kanojo wa Kiseishijo	Yu Ueno	Akaza	4
Kanojo wa Queen	Chikashi Yoshida	Iruka Shiomiya	1
Kanojo wa Warosu no Meishu-sama	Rin Mitsuno	Tomoe Sasamori	2
Kanpeki na Level 99 nado Sonzai Shinai	Tsukasa Suou	Iku Akesaka	4
Kantan na Enquete desu	Kazuma Kamachi	Kiyotaka Haimura	2
Kantan na Monitor desu	Kazuma Kamachi	Shin Kasai	1
Kare to Kanojo no Shōkan Mahō	Tsukasa Kouzuki	Bunbun	6
Karei Naru Sword Master to Saikyō Naru Fushō no Deshi	Takamaru Semikawa	Hidori	1
Kashimashi: Girl Meets Girl	Mako Komao	Yukimaru Katsura	1
Kawaiku Nanka Nai Kara ne!	Kazuaki Sena	Sikorsky	2
Kazarareta Kigō	Akira Satake	Senno Enaga	1
Kazuki no Umi ni Sasayaku Jumon	Ryo Amamiya	No illustration	1
Kekkaishi no Fugue	Hazuki Minase	Hirofumi Naruse	3
Ken'yuu-sha Sikorski Zeelife no Oinaru Tankyuu	Uzo Toshimichi	Karei	3
Ketsukyū-mura e Yōkoso	Taro Achi	Kanao Araki	6
Ketsuyoku Ō Bōmeitan	Yasumi Atarashi	Gin	1
Kiiri	Yukako Kabei	Shunsuke Taue	9
Kijō Eri to Hiiro no Meikyū	Taiga Akizuki	Yasuyuki	1
Kimi no Pantsu o Mamoritai!	Kaede Asamiya	Nemunemu	1
Kimi no Tame no Monogatari	Marehito Mikagami	Sumihey	1
Kimi to Aruku Hidamari o	Kazuya Shimura	Satoshi Kirishima	4
Kinniku no Kami Muscle	Kei Satō	Koban Sameda	2
Kino's Journey (and Gakuen Kino spin-off)	Keiichi Sigsawa	Kohaku Kuroboshi	23
Kirin wa Ichizuni Koiwosuru	Kazuya Shimura	You Shiina	6
Kirisaki Syndrome	Miroku Kobayashi	Yasuhiro Ikeda	2
Kiseki no Hyōgen	Mitsutaka Yuki	Kei	3
Kishimu Eden no Grim Reaper	Arata Takano	Senmu	3
Kishin Shinsen	Makoto Izumi	Suzuhito Yasuda	3
Kitakubu no Ace-kun	K-Ske Hasegawa	Hiroyuki	2
Kiwamete Ningoku	Tarō Achi	Aka Ringo	3
Koakuma-chan to MP0 no Shōnen	Izumi Ōmi	Nyanya	1
Koharubara Hiyori no Ikusei Nikki	Yūsaku Igarashi	Aoi Nishimata	5
Koi wa Futago de Warikirenai	Shihon Takamura	Almic	4
Koisuru Kimon no Protocol	Kinugoshi Deguchi	Won	3
Kono Lovely Doll wa Ore no Imōto desuka?	Rokutsuki Ashiya	Wadatsumi	1
Kono Tairiku de, Fijika wa Warui Kusushi datta	Suta Hatomi	Tarō Amagai	1
Kōri no Kuni no Amaryllis	Takeshi Matsuyama	Parsley	1
Kōtei Penguin ga Tonda Sora	Ryuji Saiki	K Aniki	1
Kris Naga	Miroku Kobayashi	Poco	1
Kubatsu no Akuma Shōkan Jutsu	Yoshino Origuchi	Masaki Inuzami	4
Kuhō Sayuri ga Senkyoshimasu! Moeru Kusei Jissen Manual	Daijin Washimiya	Nagayori	1
Kujira na Kanojo ni Ore no Seishun ga Buchikowaresō ni Natteimasu	Ginnan	Ame to Yuki	1
Kumori nochi Nine: Hakai Shōjo wa, Anata no Tame dake ni Namida Suru	Minato Ishikawa	Tokichi	1
Kuranai wa Kuranawi	Tomo Takaha	Benkyo Tamaoki	1
Kurogane Communication	Mizuhito Akiyama	Tomomasa Takuma	2
Kurokuro Clock	Hitoma Iruma	Kurehito Misaki	3
Kurukuru Croquis	Koma Watanabe	Shino	2
Kusonoki Tōjūrō no Sainan na Hibi	Daisuke Minai	Ichizen	2
Kuzu ga Seiken Hirotta Kekka	Kasaku Kusakabe	Anmi	3
Kyodai Meikyū to Gakuen Kōryakuka no Majutsushi	Hideto Kido	Rei	4
Kyōkagaku Hunter Rei	Yuji Nakazato	Takeshi Obata	6
Kyō kara Kakemochi Shitennō	Hyōsuke Takatō	Kōta	3
Kyūkanchō no Deka	Taro Achi	Yuka Suzuki	1
Kyūketsuki no Oshigoto (and Kyūketsuki no Himegoto series)	Suzu Suzuki	Yu Katase	10
Kyūkū Hitsugi no Shisha Sosei Gaku	Ion Aioi	Ayato Sasakura	1
Kyūshoku Sōdatsusen	Azumi	Sukima	1

=== L ===
Title	Author	Illustrator	No. of volumes
Ladies versus Butlers!	Tsukasa Kōzuki	Munyū	13
Ladwin no Bōken	Tomohiko Suitō	Seiji Kikuchi	1
Liar License	Akita Ichihara	Mofu	3
Last Dungeon e Yōkoso	Tsukasa Suou	Komori Machimura	3
Last Kiss	Kei Sato	Hitsuji Takanashi	1
Last Savior	Yagi Uzuki	Ogipote	3
Lateral	Yomoji Kiono	Anmitsu Okada	1
Layered Summer	Tsukasa Kōzuki	Neko Sakura	1
Legion	Tomonori Sugihara	Enji Yamato	2
Leo Attiel Den	Tomonori Sugihara	Okaya	4
Let it BEE!	Akira Sueba	Tea	1
Letters/Vanishing	Sayu Asahi	Oguchi	2
Level 1 Rakudai Eiyū no Isekai Kōryaku	Hideaki Mashiroya	Benio	3
Lillia and Treize	Keiichi Sigsawa	Kohaku Kuroboshi	6
Lilith ni Omakase!	Kaede Asamiya	Riko Korie	3
Lily in the Gravity Labyrinth	Tobisachi Kaneko	Yasutaka Isekawa	1
Lost Witch Bride Magical	Yū Fujiwara	Kaya Kuramoto	2
Love Chū	Meguru Kazami	Eri Natsume	1
Love na Doll!	Tsukasa Kōzuki	Tarō Amagai	3
Lucky Chance!	Mamizu Arisawa	QP:flapper	10

=== M ===
Title	Author	Illustrator	No. of volumes
Madōsho Sakka ni Narō!	Saginomiya Misaki	Kochimo	3
Magdala de Nemure	Isuna Hasekura	Tetsuhiro Nabeshima	7
Magi Strut Engage	Shū Matsuyama	Keitarō Kawagishi	2
Mahōka Kōkō no Rettōsei	Tsutomu Satō	Kana Ishida	22
Mahō Shōjo Shiken Shōtai	Joh Aikawa	Masa	1
Mahō Yōjo to Kurashi Hajimemashita	Inoshishi	Erika Raguhono	1
Maid ga Oshieru Maō-gaku!	Kazuki Izumiya	Shugasuku	3
Maji × Dora	Kaede Asamiya	Satoru Arikawa	1
Majo wa Tsuki Izuru Tokoro ni Nemuru	Kei Satō	Jū Ayakura	3
Makai Kizoku no Natsu Yasumi	Joh Aikawa	Gintarō	1
Makai ni Yobarete Kateikyōshi!?	Daijin Washimiya	Nardack	3
Maki Tantei Meiōsei O Walking no W	Matarō Echizen	No illustration	1
Mama	Izuki Kogyoku	Karasu	1
Mamoru-kun ni Megami no Shukufuku o! (and Mamoru-kun ni Bangai-hen de Shukufuku o!)	Hiroki Iwata	Toshiyuki Sato	16
Manga no Kamisama	Kazuyuki Sono	Tiv	3
Maō Gakuin no Futekigōsha	Shu	Yoshinori Shizuma	7
Maō na Ano Ko to Murabito A	Rin Yūki	Akahito	10
Maō no Shimobe ga Arawareta!	Yū Ueno	Kazuma	4
Maō to Yūsha no Keimei Kankei	Kuchiba Kurobane	Hyaku-en Lighter	1
Marriage Royale	Shingo Hifumi	Junka Morozumi, Aoi Nishimata, Hiro Suzuhira	2
Martian Warschool	Edward Smith	Kai	2
Maton Appli to Aurora	Aoi Amagarasu	Nerima	2
Mawaru Mawaru Unmei no Wa Mawaru	Uta Namino	Pun2	2
Mayu no Shōjo to Machi no Sakimori	Jirō Kurifu	Hamachi Sakai	2
Meg and Seron	Keiichi Sigsawa	Kohaku Kuroboshi	7
Meshi Ano Ichinichi	Hiroki Iwata	Toshiyuki Satō	2
Messō no Elfriede	Matsuri Akaneya	Mamuru	3
MIB	Sorajūrō Kashiwaba	Ninozen	2
Minami no Minami no	Mizuhito Akiyama	Eeji Komatsu	1
Minerva to Chie no Ki	Konomi Asō	Takurō Iwaki	1
Minutes	Yomoji Kiono	Yūgen	5
Mirai Nikki	Mitsuhiko Tatsukawa	Wingheart	1
Miru Miru Uchi ni Suki ni Naru	Mawaru Senpūki	Fukahire	1
Miss Fabre no Almas Guivre	Junpei Monogusa	Choko Fuji	4
Missing	Gakuto Coda	Shin Midorikawa	13
Mitō Shōkan://Blood Sign	Kazuma Kamachi	Waki Ikawa	4
Mitsui Sumika to Shikakui Akuma	Hyōsuke Takatō	Purin Purin	2
Mizuki Shigeko-san to Musubaremashita	Masaru Masaka	Namanie	3
Mizutama Panic.	K-Ske Hasegawa	Nanakusa	4
MM	Chikashi Yoshida	3	2
Mobu Koi	Kazuya Shimura	Ginta	3
MOE: Meshimase! Otome na Eitango	Minoo Asahi	Keepout	1
Momo to Oni no Wadachi	Akira Arisato	Atsuko Nakajima	1
Monstructor	Joh Aikawa	Tsuitachi Sakuya	1
Moriguchi Orito no Onmyōdō	Masaki Okayu	Torishimo	4
Morpheus no Kyōshitsu	En Mikami	You Shiina	4
Mō Chūnibyō demo Ii Mon!	Hisui Kawasemi	Sorimurayoji	1
Mugen no Drifter	Kaede Kitsune	Keeki Sakiyo	2
Multiplex	Tōsei Tamura	Jūki Kishin	1
Musume ja Nakute Mama ga Suki nano!?	Kōta Nozomi	Giuniu	5
MW-gō no Higeki	Takehiro Arihara, Mamizu Arisawa, Yū Fujiwara, Hiroki Iwata, Nobuyoshi Kondō, Gakuto Mikumo, Ryohgo Narita, Masaki Okayu, Keiichi Sigsawa, Nagaru Tanigawa, Soichiro Watase	Katsumi Enami, Torishimo	1
My Imagination	Hiro Arikawa, Mamizu Arisawa, Hideyuki Furuhashi, Yūsaku Igarashi, Hiroki Iwata, Tsukasa Kōzuki, Erika Nakamura, Ryohgo Narita, Jin Shibamura, Keiichi Sigsawa, Hisamitsu Ueo	Shin Kyōgoku, Kakeru Mikazuki, Munyū, Nishida, Gatame Sasori, Shunsuke Tagami, Keiji Yamamoto	1
Mystery-Chrono	Shiki Kuzumi	Komeko Amajio	3

=== N ===
Title	Author	Illustrator	No. of volumes
Nanahime Monogatari	Wataru Takano	Osamu Otani	6
Nanahushigi no Kowashikata	Akira Satake	Senno Enaga	1
Nanairo Reversible	Kaede Asamiya	Show	1
Nanatsuiro Drops	Kaya Akasaka	Noizi Ito (cover), Yuki Takami (illustration)	2
Nanatsu no Maken ga Shihai Suru	Bokuto Uno	Ruria Miyuki	8
Nareru! SE	Kōji Natsumi	Ixy	14
Natsuki Full Swing	Hideto Kido	Arima Honda	2
NEET-kei Sentai Lovely Little Drops	Rokugatsu Ashiyashi	Fujimaru	1
NEET no Ongaeshi	Hideto Maruyama	Iku Akesaka	1
Nekomimi Tō-san	Makoto Matsubara	Kendi Oiwa	1
Neko no Chikyūgi	Mizuhito Akiyama	Yū Shiina	2
Neko Sis	Tsukasa Fushimi	Hiro Kanzaki	1
Nijiiro Alien	Hitoma Iruma	Hidari	1
Ningyōtachi no Yume	Marehito Mikagami	Takemi Bunkyō	2
Nisenyonhyakukyūkai no Kanojo	Yu Nishimura	Masato Takashina	2
No Blood	Bunshō Fuse	Takanobu Aida	1
Nogizaka Haruka no Himitsu	Yusaku Igarashi	Shaa	16
Noroware	Gakuto Coda	Kakeru Mikazuki	3

=== O ===
Title	Author	Illustrator	No. of volumes
Ōcharaka Ekimae Gekijō	Taro Achi	Yuka Suzuki	1
Ojō-sama no Shiawase wa Risoukyō no Hate ni	Kuchiba Kurobane	Naoyuki Tabita	1
Ōka no Majo	Taraku Konotei	Mako Yamada	1
Ōkahōshin	Sho Tomono		12
Ōkami-san series	Masashi Okita	Unaji	13
Omae Nanzo ni Musume wa Yaren	Hideto Maruyama	Runa Tsukigami	1
Omoi wa Itsumo Senkōhanabi	Ginga Isshiki	Yui	4
Onmyō no Miyako	Soichiro Watase	Sho-U Tajima (vol. 1), Wataru Saino (vol. 2-)	5
Onna no Ko wa Yasashikute Kawaii Mono da to Kangaeteita Jiki ga Ore ni mo Arimashita	Shūichi Jimaru	Mofu	3
Ontama!	Hisui Hisui	Chiri	2
OP-Ticket Game	Shinjirō Dobashi	Ryō Ueda	2
Ore Meets Little Devil!	Hirokazu Minemori	An Inugahora	3
Ore no Jinsei wa Kamige de Aru!	Ei Ueba	Umiko	1
Ore no Idol wa Renai Kinshi!	Rin Mitsuki	Itsuki Akata	2
Ore no Imōto ga Konna ni Kawaii Wake ga Nai	Tsukasa Fushimi	Hiro Kanzaki	12
Ore no Kaa-chan ga 17-sai ni Natta	Ryū Hirosaki	Parsley	2
Ore no Pet Life ga Harem ni Mieru da to!?	Masaki Okayu	Ueshita	2
Oreshi, Isekai Gakuen de 'Joshi Toire no Kami' ni Naru.	Tsukasa Suō	Moku fu	1
Ore-tachi!! Kyupi Kyupi QPIT's!!	Sōta Nadasō	Ddal	1
Ore to Kanojo ga Maō to Yūsha de Seitokaichō	Jō Aikawa	H_{2}SO_{4}	1
Ore-sama wa Waruga Kid	Taro Achi	Tomozo	2
Ore o Suki nano wa Omae dake kayo	Rakuda	Buriki	9
Orihara Izaya to, Yūyake wo	Ryōgo Narita	Suzuhito Yasuda	1
Orusu Banshee	Masatake Ogawa	Sunaho Tobe	4
Osamake	Shūichi Nimaru	Ui Shigure	5
Ōte Keika Tori!	Yūichi Aoba	Yasu	3
Otome Game no Kōryaku Taishō ni Narimashita...	Jin Akime	Haruyuki Morisawa	2
Otome na Ōji to Majū Kishi	Yūma Hiiragi	Toku Sugi	2
Otomodachi Robo Choco	Hitoma Iruma	loundraw	1
Outlaw X Raven	Juichi Nagatsuki	Garuku	1
Over the Horizon	Satsuki Tachibana	Asahi Takashina	1
Owari no Chronicle	Minoru Kawakami	Satoyasu	14
Oz no Dia-tsukai	Akira Sueba	Tea	2

=== P ===
Title	Author	Illustrator	No. of volumes
Pain Capture	Koma Watanabe	Yoshi-Wo	1
Parallel Lovers	Tōka Shigatsu	Baku Koshijima	1
Peninsula no Shura	Chikashi Yoshida	Komeko Amajio	1
Persona 2 (Persona 2: Innocent Sin and Persona 2: Eternal Punishment)	Mie Takase	Kazuma Kaneko (cover and frontispiece); Ken Sugawara (illustration)	2
Persona × Tantei Naoto	Natsuki Mamiya	Shigenori Soejima (cover and frontispiece); Shūji Sogabe (illustration)	1
Pixie Works	Daisuke Minai	Vernier600	1
Pita-Ten	Yukari Ochiai	Koge-Donbo (cover), Rina Yamaguchi (illustration)	3
Prave!	Hyōsuke Takatō	Purin Purin	3
Please Teacher!	Go Zappa	Taraku Uon, Hiroaki Goda	1
Please Twins!	Go Zappa	Taraku Uon, Hiroaki Goda	2
Post Girl	Jiro Masuko	Gashin	4
Project Remover	Sami Shinozaki	Akihiro Kimura	3
Psyche no Namida	Jin Shibamura	Nari	1

=== Q ===
Title	Author	Illustrator	No. of volumes
Qualia the Purple	Hisamitsu Ueo	Shirō Tsunashima	1

=== R ===
Title	Author	Illustrator	No. of volumes
Radical Princess!	Tsukasa Suou	Akahito	3
Raimuiro Senkitan	Satoru Akahori	Yoshiten, Mayumi Watanabe	1
Rakuenjima kara no Dasshutsu	Shinjirō Dobashi	Haruaki Fuyuno	2
Rakuen Noise	Hikaru Sugii	Yū Akinashi	5
Rakuin no Monshō	Tomonori Sugihara	3	12
Rapunzel no Tsubasa	Shinjirō Dobashi	Ryō Ueda	4
Rasen no Enperoidā	Kouhei Kadono	Eiri Iwamoto	3
Re:Pet to Boku	Saeki Matsushita	Kana Harufuji	1
Rebellion	Gakuto Mikumo	Kaya Kuramoto	5
Red: Shūmatsu no Outsider	Shūgo Nasaka	Kozō	1
Reina Kamisu series	Eiji Mikage	No illustration	2
Reverse End	Tsumugu Hashimoto	Otohiko Takano	6
Reimei no Atena	Yuji Nakazato	Shinnosuke Tasaka	4
Rengokuhime	Yū Fujiwara	Kaya8	6
Rensha Ō	Minoru Kawakami	Not applicable	2
Rental Full Moon	Kazuaki Sena	Shungo Sumaki	3
Reset World	Kazuyuki Takami	Himeaki	3
Resin Cast Milk	Yu Fujiwara	Kaya Kuramoto	9
Reverse Kiss	Shinano Sano	Fuzzy	1
Ring & Link!	Akito Mizusawa	Satoshi Kiba	1
Rinkan no Madōshi	Soichiro Watase	Fu Midori	10
Risō no Kanojo no Tsukurikata	Tōru Takamura	Subaru Akino	3
Rival wa Ojō-sama	Yui Tokita	Sakusaku	3
Robot Butler: To Aru Gunji Robot no Second Life	Takeshi Matsuyama	Yume no Owari	1
Ro-Kyu-Bu!	Sagu Aoyama	Tinkle	15
Romeo no Sainan	Rei Rairaku	Tsuitachi Sakuya	1
Ryū to Aitsu to Kawaige no Nai Watashi	Kazuya Shimura	Ginta	9
Ryū wa Kamiyo no Michishirube to Naruka	Edward Smith	Kureta	4

=== S ===
Title	Author	Illustrator	No. of volumes
s-CRY-ed	Kazuho Hyodo	Hisashi Hirai	3
Sabikui Bisco	Shinji Cobkuko	K Akagashi, mocha	6
Sadistic Moon	Kinugoshi Deguchi	Yōji Sorimura	1
Saigo no Kane ga Naru Toki	Mamizu Arisawa, Yukako Kabei, Kazuma Kamachi, En Mikami, Ryohgo Narita, Kei Satō, Jin Shibamura, Soichiro Watase	Jū Ayakura, Yū Katase	1
Saigo no Natsu ni Miageta Sora ha	Yu Sumimoto	Bonta Oki	3
Saihate no Shroud	Gakuto Mikumo	Akashio	2
Saikyō o Kojiraseta Level Counter Stop Kenseijo Beatrice no Jakuten	Kazuma Kamachi	Mahaya	1
Saitō Alice wa Yūgai desu	Chūi	Gan	2
Sakura Denka no Himitsu	Sorajūrō Kashiwaba	Ryōchimo	1
Sakurairo Bump	Takehiro Arihara	Gunpom	2
Sakurairo no Haru o Koete	Akira Naoi	Haruaki Fuyuno	1
Sakura-sō no Pet na Kanojo	Hajime Kamoshida	Keeji Mizoguchi	13
Sakura Wars	Satoru Akahori	Hidenori Matsubara	3
Samurai Over Drive	Nozomu Kuoka	Makuraco	1
Sankaku no Kyori wa Kagirinai Zero	Misaki Saginomiya	Hiten	8
Sayonara Piano Sonata	Hikaru Sugii	Ryo Ueda	5
Screwman & Fairy Lollipops	Junpei Monogusa	Haruki Minamura	2
See-through!?	Ifusei Amou	Hinasaki	2
Seigi no Mikata no Mikata no Mikata	Jō Aikawa	Tsuitachi Sakuya	3
Seiken no Sword Labyrinth	Natsuki Mamiya	Kei Takanashi	1
Seikenshi VS Black Kigyō	Ryu Hirosaki	100yen Locker	1
Seiren Sangokushi	Shūniko Nana	Comeco Amajio	1
Seishun Buta Yarō	Hajime Kamoshida	Keeji Mizoguchi	9
Seishun Lariat!!	Takamaru Semikawa	Sumihey	5
Seiyū Radio no Ura Omote	Nogatsu Kō	Sabamizore	4
Sekaiheiwa wa Ikka Danran no Ato ni	Kazuya Hashimoto	Koban Sameda	10
Sekai no Chūshin Hariyama-san	Ryohgo Narita	Katsumi Enami, Suzuhito Yasuda	3
Sekai no Owari, Subarashiki Hibi yori	Sui Hifumi	Naba Nanoha	3
Senketsu no Elf	Yū Fujiwara	Kona	2
Senkō Shōjo Airi the Nameless Light	Hajime Nakamura	Chiiko	1
Senpai to Boku	Masashi Okita	Koyori Kusanagi	6
Sentōki Shōjo Chronicle	Takuma Rurimaru	Buriki, Eeji Komatsu, Kiyotaka Haimura, Kōji Ogata, Kurogin, Nagiryo, Nardack, Osa, Ukai Saki, Yūgen	1
Serious Rage	Toshiyuki Shirakawa	Yasuyuki	7
Seven Saga	Nishiki Izumi	Eiji Abiko, Majiro	2
SE-X File	Yūsaku Igarashi	Shaa	2
Shadow Taker	En Mikami	Keiichi Sumi	5
Shakugan no Shana	Yashichiro Takahashi	Noizi Ito	26
Sharp Edge	Shin-ichi Sakairi	Nagi	3
Shēgā	Kaede Kitsune	Matarō	1
Shichika, Toki Tobu!	Shiki Kuzumi	Kagayo Myōjō	1
Shichinin Misaki mo Koi o Suru	Hideto Maruyama	Karei	2
Shift	Hisamitsu Ueo	STS	3
Shigofumi: Stories of Last Letter	Ryo Amamiya	Poko	4
Shikkoku no Einherjar	Akira Aihara	Nyoro	3
Shindeshimau to Hanasakenai!	Shirō Kuta	Glider	2
Shine Post: Nee Shitteta? Watashi o Zettai Idol ni Suru Tame no, Goku Futsū de Atarimae na, to Bikkiri no Mahou!	Rakuda	Buriki	1
Shinigami Rising	Kazuhiro Yuki	Sunao Minakata	1
Shino Shino	Kaede Asamiya	Yuse Shiramori	1
Shio no Machi	Hiro Arikawa	Shoji	1
Shirayama-san to Kuroi Kaban	Rin Suzuki	Kokonoka	4
Shiritsu! Sanjūsan Gendō Gakuin	Kei Sato	Kamiyamaneki	13
Shirogane no Sword Breaker	Takeshi Matsuyama	Fal Maro	4
Shirohime Quest	Yusaku Igarashi	Miz22 (cover, frontispiece); Manyako (frontispiece); Soto (illustration)	2
Shirokuro Nekuro	Ryōto Takama	Shigetaka Kimura	4
Shirona-san, Oishiku Itadaichaimasu	Kōichi Nitadori	Ria Runa	2
Shishi no Gyokuza	Maki Masato	Jun Futaba	3
Shisho to Hasami to Migikai Enpitsu	Rin Yuki	Shunsaku Tomose	7
Shishunki Boys x Girls Sensō	Keishun Akisaka	Gintarō	1
Shisō Toshokan no Libre Blanche	Yoshino Origuchi	KeG	5
Shitsuren Tantei Momose	Saginomiya Misaki	Nardack	3
Shizuno-san no Futago	Marehito Mikagami	Jin Sakuya	1
Shōjo wa Shoka no Umi de Nemuru	Isuna Hasekura	Suiren Matsukaze	1
Shōnen Tengusa no Shoppai Jumon	Osamu Makino	Kohaku Sumeragi	1
Shunka Shūtō Daikōsha	Kana Akatsuki	Suou	2
S.I.A.	Shibuichi Nagatsuki	Noco	1
Sister Succubus wa Zange Shinai	Yoshino Origuchi	KeG	3
Six Volt	Kamino Okina	Kouji Ogata	3
Sky Fall	Minato Ishikawa	Tokichi	1
Sōkoku no Pendulum	Koji Toriu	Akira Ishida	4
Sorairona	Ginga Isshiki	Karasu Konatsu	1
Sora no Kane no Hibiku Hoshi de	Soichiro Watase	Minako Iwasaki	13
Sōryūki	Kaoru Yasuhiko	Tomatika	3
Sōsei no Ki	Jirō Kurifu	Ono Shiro	3
Sōsei no Sōsasen	Kijitora Akū	Akabane	1
Soshite, Dare mo ga Uso o Tsuku	Marehito Mikagami	Tea	1
Sōten no Legends	Hisui Hisui	Yūnagi	2
Soul Gluttony	Kazuki Izumiya	Shugasuku	1
Spice and Wolf	Isuna Hasekura	Jū Ayakura	23
Starship Operators	Ryo Mizuno	Ryu Naito (illustration); Kimitoshi Yamane (mechanical design)	6
Stop Marika-chan!	Seiya Suganuma	Mirura Yano	1
Strange Moon	Soichiro Watase	Rein Kuwashima	3
Strawberry Panic!	Sakurako Kimino	Namuchi Takumi	3
Strike the Blood	Gakuto Mikumo	Manyako	15
Sugar Sister 1/2	Arata Takano	Shirō	2
Sukima Onna (Habahiro)	Hideto Maruyama	Risa Miyasu	1
Sweet Line	Mamizu Arisawa	Mizu Kisaragi	5
Sword Art Online (and Sword Art Online: Progressive)	Reki Kawahara	abec	26 (+8)
Sword Art Online: Alternative Gun Gale Online	Keiichi Sigsawa	Kouhaku Kuroboshi	10

=== T ===
Title	Author	Illustrator	No. of volumes
Tabi ni Deyō, Horobi Yuku Sekai no Hate Made.	Tadahito Yorozuya	Hōmitsu	1
Tada, Sore Dake de Yokattandesu	Ryoya Matsumura	Miho Takeoka	1
Take Five	Takehiro Arihara	Yuu Nonaka	2
Tales of Xillia	Kaoru Yasuhiko	Yūko Satō	3
Tamako-san to Kashiwa-kun	Hitoma Iruma	Hidari	1
Tantei Opera Milky Holmes: Overture	Hideaki Koyasu	Natsuki Tanihara (cover), Keiichi Ishikura (illustration)	1
Tantei Shikkaku	Chuui	Zerokichi	2
Tarot no Goshujin-sama	Hirotaka Nanae	Yukirin	12
Tasogare Machi no Korosanai Ansatsusha	Kurage Terada	Kashii	1
Tatoeba Love to Kamisama Days.	K-Ske Hasegawa	Inko Horiizumi	1
Tengoku ni Namida wa Iranai	Kei Sato	Aoi Sagano	12
Tenkyō no Alderamin	Bokuto Uno	Sanbasō	9
Tenkyū no Kamui	K-Ske Hasegawa	Nanakusa	1
Tenkū no Arukamiresu	En Mikami	Keiichi Sumi	5
Tenshi no 3P!	Sagu Aoyama	Tinkle	7
Tenshi no Recipe	Otogimakura	Matsuryu	2
Tensō no Shita no Bashiresu	Kohei Ito	Yuchi Kosumi	2
Tetora	Mishio Fukazawa	Keiji Yamamoto	1
The Breaker	Yagi Uzuki	Niritsu	1
The Isolator	Reki Kawahara	Shimeji	5
Theta	Chitose Tōma	Kurapon	1
Taishō Kūsō Majutsu Yawa	Saginomiya Misaki	Noco	1
Thunder Girl!	Suzu Suzuki	Yu Katase	3
Toaru Majutsu no Heavy na Zashiki Warashi ga Kantan na Satsujin-ki no Konkatsu Jijō	Kazuma Kamachi	Ryō Nagi (cover)	1
Toaru Majutsu no Index (and Shin'yaku: Toaru Majutsu no Index, Sou'yaku: Toaru Majutsu no Index)	Kazuma Kamachi	Kiyotaka Haimura	53
Toaru Majutsu no Virtual-On	Kazuma Kamachi	Hajime Katoki	1
Tokui Ryōiki no Tokuiten	Shūsei Hanno	Saitom	2
Tobira no Soto	Shinjiro Dobashi	Shiromi Zakana	3
Tōdōke wa Kamigakari	Hyōsuke Takatō	Hidekazu Yutani	3
Tokage no Ō	Hitoma Iruma	Buriki	5
Toki no Maho to Ubatama no Yoru	Takehiro Arihara	Gunpom	1
Tokyo Dragon Strike	Nobuori Nagata	Hiroki Ohara	1
Tokyo Shadow	Aya Nishitani	Hitoshi Wakana and Ki	4
Tōkyō Soul Withers	Nekotarō Aizen	Reo Obata	1
Tokyo Vampire Finance	Junjō Shindō	Shōnen Sasaki	1
Toradora! (and Toradora Spin-off!)	Yuyuko Takemiya	Yasu	13
Torajima!	Taro Achi	Tateha	2
Torikagosō no Kyō mo Nemutai Jūmintachi	Yukako Kabei	Tekunosamata	6
Toshi series	Minoru Kawakami	Satoyasu	15
To Witch Seru!	Ginga Isshiki	Yayoi Hizuki	1
Train+Train	Hideyuki Kurata	Tomomasa Takuma	5
Tricksters	Mishiki Kuzu	Komeko Amajio	6
Tristia of the Deep-Blue Sea	Takashi Aki	Eeji Komatsu (frontispiece), Atsushi Ogasawara (cover)	1
TRPG Shitai Dake na no ni!	Masaki Okayu	Nanashina	2
Tsukikoi	Chiaki Yamashina	Otohiko Takano	1
Tsuki to Anata ni Hanataba o	Kazuya Shimura	You Shiina	8
Tsukumodō Kottōten	Akihiko Mido	Takeshi Masatoshi	7
Tsuyokunai Mama New Game	Hitoma Iruma	Ryō Ueda	2

=== U ===
Title	Author	Illustrator	No. of volumes
Uchi no Hime-sama ni wa Gakkari desu...	Suzu Suzuki	Takuya Fujima	4
Uchūjin no Mura e Yōkoso Shinomura Nōgyō Kōkō Tanteibu wa Mita!	Daisuki Matsuya	Eight Shimotsuki	1
Ultimate Girls	Seiichi Take	Ryusuke Hamamoto	1
Umi o Miagete	Tensei Hibiki	Osamu Otani	1
Umibe no Usagi	Suzu Suzuki	Yu Katase	1
Undead Banisuta!	Suzu Suzuki	Taro Kana	2
Under	Kazuaki Sena	U	2
Underland Dogs	Akira Nakata	Hitowa	1
Under Rug Rocking	Itsuki Nase	Izumi Kazuto	1
Unmei ni Aisarete Gomen Nasai	Kurma Uwami	Kai Tomohiro	3
Usagi no Eigakan	Sunao Tonozaki	Shunsuke Taue	1
Usotsuki Mii-kun to Kowareta Maa-chan	Hitoma Iruma	Hidari	11
Utsurosaki Masaki no Misshitsu Play	Ion Aioi	Matsuryu	1

=== V ===
Title	Author	Illustrator	No. of volumes
Valhalla no Ban Gohan	Kazutoshi Mikagami	Maro Fal	1
Valkyrja no Kikō	Rin Yuki	Kazuo Miyamura	4
Valvrave the Liberator	Yomoji Kiono	Yūgen	3
Vamp!	Ryohgo Narita	Katsumi Enami	5
Vandal Garōgai no Kiseki	Mamoru Minagawa	Saku Mochizuki	3
Vehicle End	Hisamitsu Ueno	Redjuice	1
VS!!	Nishiki Izumi	Nao Shirahane	3

=== W ===
Title	Author	Illustrator	No. of volumes
Waga Mai wa Kyūketsuki dearu	Kiminori Ogano	Zpolice	2
Wagaya no Dungeon	Ifusei Amou	Urabi	2
Wagaya no Oinari-sama.	Jin Shibamura	Hoden Eizo	7
Walpurgis no Kōkai	Kouhei Kadono	Kouji Ogata	4
Waltraute-san no Konkatsu Jijō	Kazuma Kamachi	Ryō Nagi	1
Wamikabara Uguisu no Ronshō	Shiki Kuzumi	Katsuki	1
Warlock Holmes	Sadato Taube	Yoshie Katō	1
War-lock Princess: Sensō Goroshi no Himegimi to Rokunin no Kashin-tachi	Kanae Saito	Ichijiku	1
Watashitachi no Tamura-kun	Yuyuko Takemiya	Yasu	2
Watashi to Anata Seishun Kakumei	Sakaki Hirozawa	Cuteg	2
Westadia no Sōsei	Masatake Ogawa	Tsuyuki	8
Wistadia no Futaboshi	Masatake Ogawa	Shinsetsu	5
Wizard & Warrior With Money	Ghost Mikawa	Kippu	3
Wizard's Brain	Reiichi Saegusa	Keiichi Sumi	17
World End Eclipse Tenkyū no Gunshi	Sōichirō Watase	Katsumi Enami	1
World End Economica	Isuna Hasekura	Isshiki Uwatsuki	3

=== Y ===
Title	Author	Illustrator	No. of volumes
Yagate Maken no Alicebell	Chūgaku Akamatsu	Gekka Urū	7
Yama: Ki	Gakuto Coda	Kakeru Mikazuki	1
Yarinaoshi Majutsu Kikōshi no Saisenroku	Ikkei Jyukaidō	Rangetsu	2
Yōkai Seishun Hakusho	Masashi Okita	Nukomasu	1
Yōkoso, Fairies Inn e!	Masatake Ogawa	Shōtarō Tokunō	2
Yome ni Shiro to Semaru Osananajimi no Tame ni xx Shitemita	Meguru Kazami	Konomi	3
Yomesen!	Maki Masato	Satoshi Goma	7
Yoru no Chōcho to Dōkyo Keikaku!	Manabi Hishida	Santa Matsuri	3
Yoru to Chi to Kankei.	Hideto Maruyama	Osa	3
Your Forma	Mareho Kikuishi	Tsubata Nozaki	1
Yozakura Vanpanella	Hikaru Sugii	Cake Sakiyo	2
Yuki Kamakiri	Izuki Kōgyoku	Takarō Iwaki	1
Yuki no Tsubasa no Freesia	Takeshi Matsuyama	Hirasato	1
Yurayura to Yureru Umi no Kanata	Nobuyoshi Kondo	Ebine	10
Yūsha ni wa Katenai	Shirō Kuta	Refeia	1

=== Z ===
Title	Author	Illustrator	No. of volumes
Zarathustra e no Kaidan	Shinjiro Dobashi	Shiromi Zakana	3
Zashiki-warashi ni Dekiru Koto	Hirotaka Nanae	Yousuke Ikeda	6
Zefagarudo	Jin Shibamura	Haruaki Fuyuno	1
Zenon-sama dearu!	Masaki Okayu	Yōta	1
Zeppeto no Musumetachi	Yūei Miki	Sōji Miyata	2
Zero kara Hajimeru Mahō no Sho	Kakeru Kobashiri	Yoshinori Shizuma	9
Zessei Shōjo Defensor	Maki Masato	Kazuyuki Yoshizumi	1
Zetsubōkei Tojirareta Sekai	Nagaru Tanigawa	G Muryo	1
