= Soichiro Watase =

Japanese writer

Souichirou Watase (渡瀬 草一郎, Watase Sōichirō) (born 1978), is a Japanese author from Yokohama city, Kanagawa prefecture. He made his debut with the fantasy novel Onmyo no Miyako (陰陽ノ京, Onmyō no Miyako) in 2001, after winning Gold at the 7th Dengeki Game Novel Prize in 2000. He is also the creator of Parasite Moon and Rinkan no Madōshi.

== Works ==
=== Onmyo no Miyako series ===
Onmyo no Miyako (陰陽ノ京, Onmyō no Miyako) series was illustrated by Sho-u Tajima (田島昭宇, Tajima Shōu) (vol.1 only) and Wataru Saino (酒乃渉, Saino Wataru) (vol.2 or later).

- Volume 1 (ISBN 4840217408)
- Volume 2 (ISBN 4840220336)
- Volume 3 (ISBN 4840220980)
- Volume 4 (ISBN 4840223777)
- Volume 5 (ISBN 4840237646)

=== Parasite Moon series ===
Parasite Moon (パラサイトムーン, Parasaito Mūn) series was illustrated by Hagiyamasakage (はぎやまさかげ).

- Volume 1 -Kazamitori no Su- (ISBN 484021820X)
- Volume 2 -Nezumi tachi no Kyoen- (ISBN 484021882X)
- Volume 3 -Hyakunen Garō- (ISBN 4840219788)
- Volume 4 -Koin Yowa- (ISBN 4840221561)
- Volume 5 -Suityu Teien no Sakana- (ISBN 4840222134)
- Volume 6 -Meikyu no Maigo tachi- (ISBN 4840222754)

=== Sora no Kane no Hibiku Hoshi de series ===
Sora no Kane no Hibiku Hoshi de (空ノ鐘の響く惑星で) series was illustrated by Minako Iwasaki (岩崎美奈子, Iwasaki Minako).

- Volume 1 (ISBN 4840224870)
- Volume 2 (ISBN 4840226032)
- Volume 3 (ISBN 4840226865)
- Volume 4 (ISBN 4840227586)
- Volume 5 (ISBN 4840228469)
- Volume 6 (ISBN 4840229384)
- Volume 7 (ISBN 4840230846)
- Volume 8 (ISBN 4840231818)
- Volume 9 (ISBN 4840232415)
- Volume 10 (ISBN 4840233489)
- Volume 11 (ISBN 484023485X)
- Volume 12 (ISBN 4840235899)
- Gaiden -tea party's story- (ISBN 4840239142)

=== Rinkan no Madoshi series ===
Rinkan no Madōshi (輪環の魔導師, Rinkan no Madoushi) series is illustrated by Fu Midori (碧風羽, Midori Fuu).

- Volume 1 (ISBN 4840240663)
- Volume 2 (ISBN 4840241910)
- Volume 3 (ISBN 4048671324)
- Volume 4 (ISBN 4048672681)
- Volume 5 (ISBN 4048675982)
- Volume 6 (ISBN 4048679066)
- Volume 7 (ISBN 4048684620)
- Volume 8 (ISBN 4048702378)
- Volume 9 (ISBN 404870740X)
- Volume 10 (ISBN 4048868578)

=== Sword Art Online Alternative: Clover's Regret ===
Sword Art Online Alternative Clover's Regret (ソードアート・オンライン オルタナティブ クローバーズ・リグレット, Sōdo Āto Onrain Orutanatibu Kurōbāzu Riguretto) series is illustrated by Ginta (ぎん太).

- Volume 1 (ISBN 9784048924870)
- Volume 2 (ISBN 9784048935944)
- Volume 3 (ISBN 9784048939713)

=== Others ===
- Seiya no Kane no Hibiku Houkago (聖夜ノ鐘の響く放課後)
- Sora no Kane no Hibiku Houkago (空ノ鐘の響く放課後)
- Kagami no Mukou (カガミのムコウ)
- Who wrote it? Majoruka. (Who wrote it? 「まじょるか。」)
- Zankokugeki no Yoru (残酷劇の夜)
