= List of Kino's Journey episodes =

ADV Films Region 1 DVD box set containing all thirteen episodes of Kino's Journey —the Beautiful World— (2003)

Kino's Journey —the Beautiful World— is an anime series based on the light novel series of the same name written by Keiichi Sigsawa and illustrated by Kohaku Kuroboshi. The series follows a traveler named Kino and her talking motorcycle, known as a Motorrad, named Hermes, as they explore countries with unique customs and people around a mysterious world, only spending three days at each location. Produced by A.C.G.T and Genco, and directed by Ryūtarō Nakamura, the 13-episode series aired weekly on the WOWOW satellite television network between April 8 and July 8, 2003. It was also broadcast on the anime satellite television network Animax, which also aired the series on its networks in Southeast Asia, East Asia, and South Asia. The episodes were released to Region 2 DVD compilation volumes between June 18 and November 19, 2003. Spanning six volumes, each volume contained two episodes except the first, which had three. The series was re-released in two, three volume bundles on January 19, 2005, and February 16, 2005. In addition to the main series, there is also a 12-minute-long prologue entitled "Episode 0: The Tower Country —Freelance—" which was released as an original video animation episode with the first animated film's DVD release on October 19, 2005.

The 13-episode anime series was licensed for North American distribution by ADV Films. The episodes were initially released on four DVD compilations between February 24 and June 29, 2004; the first volume contained four episodes, while each of the subsequent volumes contained three episodes. The first DVD volume was sold in two editions, with the difference between the two being a series box all four DVDs could fit inside. A DVD box set titled Kino's Journey: The Complete Collection was released on October 25, 2005, containing three discs.

Two pieces of theme music were used for the anime: one opening theme and one ending theme. The opening theme is "All the way" by Mikuni Shimokawa and the ending theme is "the Beautiful World" by Ai Maeda; both singles were released on June 18, 2003. A new anime television series adaptation titled Kino's Journey —the Beautiful World— the Animated Series aired from October 6 to December 22, 2017. It is animated by Lerche and produced by Egg Firm. The series is directed by Tomohisa Taguchi, with Yukie Sugawara supervising scripts and Ryoko Amisaki designing the characters. The opening theme is "Here and There" and the ending theme is "Satōdama no Tsuki" (砂糖玉の月), both by Nagi Yanagi. Crunchyroll is streaming the anime with subtitles, and Funimation will stream the series with a simuldub.

== Episode list ==
=== Kino's Journey —the Beautiful World— (2003) ===
No.	Title	Original release date
0 (OVA)	"The Tower Country —Freelance—"; Transliteration: "Tō no Kuni" (Japanese: 塔の国)	October 19, 2005
Traveler Kino and talking motorcycle Hermes ride into a city featuring a tower that reaches up into the sky. There, Kino meets a boy who does not want to spend all his life building the tower which has been built continuously for 230 years. It is the sole obsessive activity of the population although nobody seems to know why. One day, the tower begins to crack and crumbles to the ground. Rather than being disappointed, the people rejoice at being able to see it fall. They immediately commence building a new one, this time with engravings.
1	"Land of Visible Pain —I See You.—"; Transliteration: "Hito no Itami ga Wakaru Kuni" (Japanese: 人の痛みがわかる国)	April 8, 2003
Kino and Hermes find themselves in a country that seems to be inhabited only by servile machines. After exploring the country for one day, Kino notices that there are people living alone in cottages in the outskirts of the country. Kino befriends a lonely man there who tells her that the entire human population drank a special liquid which enabled them to understand each other's thoughts with the aim of creating harmony across the country. However, being able to read each other's minds only brought disharmony to society through being aware of the unfiltered thoughts of every other person, even between the lonely man and his wife. The only solution for the population was for everyone to live a short distance from each other. The lonely man asks Kino to stay, but she declines and continues on her way, passing by the cottage of his wife living nearby.
2	"A Tale of Feeding Off Others —I Want to Live.—"; Transliteration: "Hito o Kutta Hanashi" (Japanese: 人を喰った話)	April 15, 2003
Towards the end of winter, Kino comes across three starving traders who are trapped in their truck which is bogged in the snow. She offers to hunt food for them until they recover, killing and cooking rabbits although she has misgivings about valuing the lives of the men over those of the rabbits. As the snow begins to thaw, Kino uses Hermes to help extract their truck. However, the traders draw guns on her, explaining that they are actually human traffickers and she would be of value to them. When they are distracted by falling snow, Kino manages to attack and kill two of them before executing the third. Inside their truck, she finds the remains of the human cargo that they ate to stay alive through the winter. While riding away, Hermes asks Kino if she would make the same choice again.
3	"Land of Prophecies —We NO The Future—"; Transliteration: "Yogen no Kuni" (Japanese: 予言の国)	April 22, 2003
Kino and Hermes arrive in a country where everyone believes that the world will end the next day according to their Book of Prophecy as interpreted by the southern priest, but the northern priest declares that his interpretation predicts that the event will occur in thirty years. Kino then passes by a country where travelers rarely visit. After she leaves, the populace begin to think of different traditions to entice the next traveler to stay. When Kino arrives in the Sad Land, she learns from a boatman that a poet was commissioned by the king to write a sad poem, which he did after his wife committed suicide. Ten years after the poet died, society arranged for a chosen girl to recite the poem every day. Before Kino leaves, a male examiner tells her that the poem was written down and a nearby country acquired it, calling it the Book of Prophecy. Camped overnight under the stars, Kino is interrupted by an army from the Land of Prophecies invading the Sad Land. A soldier informs Kino that a new interpretation of the Book of Prophecy indicated that the next country is responsible for their world coming to an end.
4	"Land of Adults —Natural Right—"; Transliteration: "Otona no Kuni" (Japanese: 大人の国)	May 6, 2003
When Kino was eleven years old, she never knew her name before first meeting the mysterious traveler Kino while in the Land of Adults. He stayed at her family's inn for a few days where he repaired an old motorcycle in the basement, and they named it Hermes. She explained that children on their twelfth birthday undergo an operation to become a hardworking adult in the country. When she has doubts about the adult operation after he opened her eyes to other possibilities, the townspeople turned on him and he decided to leave. However, when her parents prepared to kill her for challenging their customs, the original Kino stepped in front to protect her and was killed instead. As her father pulled the knife from the original Kino's lifeless body to kill her, Hermes suggested that she ride away instead. After fleeing to a field of crimson flowers, she took on the original Kino's name as her own and changed into his clothes, including his long traveling coat.
5	"Three Men Along the Rails —On the Rails—"; Transliteration: "Rēru no Ue no Sannin no Otoko" (Japanese: レールの上の三人の男)	May 13, 2003
As Kino rides Hermes along an old railroad, she meets a railway track polisher who has been working for fifty years. Stopping for a break, he asks her to tell him a story about her travels. She recalls a modernized country with advanced machines, where people chose to do meaningless tasks instead of work, encountering a working stiff who did calculations all day just for the stress. As she rides further, she meets a railway track demolisher who has also been working for fifty years. As she rides even further, she meets a railway track layer who has been working for fifty years as well. After three days of exploring ruined buildings in the next country, Kino finally meets a survivor who tells her that the people removed the oppressive king and formed a democracy ruled by majority vote ten years ago. Unfortunately, anyone who questioned the democracy was executed until the graveyard was overflowing. Kino prepares to leave, but the survivor pulls out a gun and insists that she stays. However, Kino and Hermes outvote him so that they can ride away, hearing gunshots echoing in the empty streets behind them.
6	"Coliseum (Part 1) —Avengers—"; Transliteration: "Koroshiamu (Zenpen)" (Japanese: コロシアム(前編))	May 20, 2003
Kino stops off in a country reputed to be wonderful, but she finds that all visitors must participate in battle tournaments in a coliseum to become a first-class citizen in the surface city or be subjected to slavery as a second-class citizen in the sewage city, due to the law laid down by the country's hedonistic king. The eventual winner then has the right to make a new law. Abiding by this custom, Kino wins the first round when her opponent yields. Kino also meets Shizu, another contestant, who tells her that the current king murdered his father seven years ago to take the throne and had his children banished. In the second round, Kino first faces an assassin and then a colonel, but she forces them both to surrender. Before the semifinal rounds approach the following day, only four challengers are left, them being Kino, Shizu, a withdrawn woman named Miss Rose and a gunfighter named Sixshooter.
7	"Coliseum (Part 2) —Avengers—"; Transliteration: "Koroshiamu (Kōhen)" (Japanese: コロシアム(後編))	May 27, 2003
The king treats the semifinalists to a play about how he was crowned by killing his father and later his wife. However, the semifinalists leave after they are unamused, and even Kino witnesses the king's madness for marriage. During the semifinal rounds, Kino and Shizu each triumph against Miss Rose and Sixshooter, respectively. Meanwhile, Hermes discovers that Shizu's Samoyed dog companion Riku can speak. In the final round, Kino faces the sword-wielding Shizu, eventually disarming his sword. Although Shizu refuses to surrender, Kino pretends to shoot at Shizu and aims a flare into the king's private suite, killing the king. As the winner, Kino proclaims a new law that the first-class citizens can fight each other until the last person standing becomes king, leading to chaos in the country but liberation for the second-class citizens. On the road, Kino encounters Shizu, who reveals that he is the country's prince and returned to kill the king. Hermes later tells Kino that Riku can speak, but Kino does not believe it.
8	"Land of Wizards —Potentials of Magic—"; Transliteration: "Mahōtsukai no Kuni" (Japanese: 魔法使いの国)	June 3, 2003
In the Land of Wizards, worth and power are measured by a person's ability to increase crop production. However, in this agriculturally oriented land dwells a woman named Nimya who dares to dream of something completely different. Nimya desperately wants to build a successful aircraft, and she has dedicated her life to fulfilling her dream despite the lack of support from her peers. To help bring her dream to fruition, Nimya invites Kino and Hermes to her house and explains that she needs the town's bronze statue to be removed from the main road so she can test her latest aircraft prototype. The next day, Nimya is issued an order from the chief for her aircraft to be dismantled and burned, due to numerous complaints from the townspeople. Despite this, Kino and Hermes still convince Nimya to test out the aircraft on the following morning with the use of a ramp and tubes filled with gunpowder in order to simulate a launch. After the test proves to be successful, the chief and the townspeople forgive Nimya. Kino and Hermes go on their way, commenting that the aircraft flew as if by magic.
9	"Land of Books —Nothing Is Written!—"; Transliteration: "Hon no Kuni" (Japanese: 本の国)	June 10, 2003
Kino and Hermes encounter an escaped man in the desert who gives Kino a book that she can use to exchange when she arrives to the Land of Books, which gathers together all the books in the world. However, they find out that the Department of Reading and Welfare locks away books considered "harmful" inside the Castle, leaving only the "harmless" ones out on display to read in the library. The librarian recognizes Kino's book as being from her boyfriend who left the country. The librarian is part of the Publication Syndicate, a resistance group that seeks a secret passage into the Castle to rescue their comrades who have been caught by the Department of Reading and Welfare. Stumbling upon a key and a manuscript, Kino crosses paths with an author, who later leads her to the Castle, where former comrades are forced to become literature critics. After giving the key to the librarian, Kino meets Miss Minister, responsible for trying to catch the author but ended up luring Kino instead. Kino is allowed to keep the manuscript for herself, but the Castle's library full of harmful books is reported to be in flames.
10	"A Tale of Mechanical Dolls —One-way Mission—"; Transliteration: "Kikai Ningyō no Hanashi" (Japanese: 機械人形の話)	June 17, 2003
While searching for a village where she can get Hermes's speedometer repaired, Kino stumbles across a nanny, who serves a father, a mother and a son living in the woods but claims to be a mechanical doll. As Kino spends time with the family during dinner while the nanny leaves to recharge in the closet, Kino begins to realize that the nanny is more human than the family. The nanny later manages to repair Hermes's speedometer. However, she eventually dies, showing that she was human after all. At the nanny's graveside, the family reveals to Kino that they are mechanical dolls created by the nanny over fifty-four years earlier during a time of conflict in the land. After the nanny was left alone when her husband and son were killed, the family flooded the village so that she would not be reminded of the past. The family also cared for her and acted the role of a family. They offer to serve their role as a family for Kino, but she declines. Realizing that they no longer have a useful function, the family plunges into the depths of the lake that they created.
11	"Her Journey —Love and Bullets—"; Transliteration: "Kanojo no Tabi" (Japanese: 彼女の旅)	June 24, 2003
As Kino and Hermes drift on a raft downstream, Kino recalls people whom she has met on her travels, in particular those undertaking journeys of their own in which she chose not to intervene. Jin sought revenge for her husband's death and shot a former criminal named Ace. Brock wanted to atone for his violent past, which was unknown to his love interest named Sica. When Kino was younger, her Master, an old woman, saved her from being attacked by a wolf. Kino also recalls that she stopped at a hermitage when running low on fuel. There, she found a caretaker named Su who was caring for a wise man. The wise man explained that his attitude to life was only the result of cruel experiments to erase self-consciousness, thought to be the root of desire and criminal behavior. However, the experiments failed because his motivation was also erased. Su managed to calm down the wise man when Kino figured out the actual meaning of the "true blue sky". Hermes later remarks that Kino's life is little different to those they have met on their travels, but Kino replies that she is trying to live her life consciously.
12	"A Peaceful Land —Mother's Love—"; Transliteration: "Heiwa na Kuni" (Japanese: 平和な国)	July 1, 2003
Kino and Hermes visit Veldelval, a land that prides itself on a being a peaceful nation. However, abandoned military equipment litters the streets, and an army is training on the outskirts of town for a war to be held on the following day. Curious about these contradictions, Kino visits the museum of national history and learns from the curator that Veldelval finally found a solution fifteen years ago after being at war with Relsumia for 192 years. The next day, Kino is escorted by a guide to the outskirts of the country, where Kino understands that the solution is for both armies to attack a tribal village of defenseless Tatatans nearby, in which the army causing the most casualties is declared the winner each year. Kino returns to the museum, where the curator explains that it was partially her idea to establish an annual Tatatan hunt to achieve sacrificial peace between Veldelval and Relsumia. As Kino and Hermes leaves the country, they are surrounded by vengeful Tatatans who want to kill Kino, but they disperse when she kills one of them, much to her own dismay.
13	"A Kind Land —Tomorrow Never Comes—"; Transliteration: "Yasashii Kuni" (Japanese: 優しい国)	July 8, 2003
When Kino hears of a land where travelers are shunned, she decides to visit anyway and experience the people's attitude for herself. To her surprise, when she says she will stay only three days, the inhabitants become extremely friendly and welcoming. Kino is soon made to feel at home among them and makes friends with Lily, a girl whose parents Mr. and Mrs. Sakura own an inexpensive hotel, which reminds Kino of her younger self. Lily's grandpa fixes Kino's gun while Lily gives Kino a grand tour of the country. He later has a hunch that the gun previously belonged to Kino's Master, but Kino denies this fact. When Kino considers staying a little longer after adoring a bride and a groom getting married, the citizens react strangely, but they then shower her with parting gifts when she leaves. That evening, Kino watches in horror as a pyroclastic flow engulfs the land. Kino then reads a letter given to her, explaining that the people knew of the impending destruction but decided to stay in the place that they were raised and always cherished.

=== Kino's Journey —the Beautiful World— the Animated Series (2017) ===
No. overall	No. in season	Title	Original release date
14	1	"A Country Where People Can Kill Others —Jungle's Rule—"; Transliteration: "Hito o Korosu Koto ga Dekiru Kuni" (Japanese: 人を殺すことができる国)	October 6, 2017
Kino and Hermes encounter a tattooed troublemaker, who intends to settle in the country ahead where murder is legal and hopes to meet Regel, an infamous serial killer. Upon arriving in the country, Kino is surprised to find that the inhabitants are peaceful and friendly, despite being armed. During her stay for three days, she befriends a kindly old man, but she declines his offer to stay to fit in among the citizens. As she prepares to depart, the tattooed troublemaker returns and demands Kino to hand over her belongings as "compensation". When she refuses, he draws his gun, but the locals stop him with crossbows. The old man tells him that killing is only allowed to punish those who plan or commit murder. The distraught tattooed troublemaker is then killed by the old man, revealing himself to be Regel. After leaving, Kino encounters another gunslinger escaping from a country of violence and murder, and she tells him that the country that she just came from would be perfect for him.
15	2	"Colosseum —Avengers—"; Transliteration: "Koroshiamu" (Japanese: コロシアム)	October 13, 2017
Kino arrives in a country, where she is forced to participate in a tournament held trimonthly in which contestants fight each other in a colosseum to the death or until one opponent yields. The winner then becomes a citizen with the right to make a new law. Hermes learns from the colosseum guard that the king murdered his father seven years ago to take the throne, leading his wife to commit suicide and their son and daughter to run away. After Kino forces four colosseum opponents to yield, she faces a young swordsman named Shizu in the final round. During an even match, Kino pretends to shoot Shizu and fires a flare that breaks through the king's private suite, killing the king. As the winner, Kino proclaims her new law that the citizens can fight each other until the last person standing becomes king, leading to chaos in the colosseum. After escaping, Kino and Hermes encounter Shizu and his talking Samoyed dog companion Riku. Shizu reveals himself as the country's prince who returned to kill the king, gratefully thanking Kino for ending his father's tyrannical rule before Kino and Hermes take their leave.
16	3	"Bothersome Country —Leave Only Footsteps!—"; Transliteration: "Meiwaku na Kuni" (Japanese: 迷惑な国)	October 20, 2017
Kino and Hermes board a "traveling country", housing an entire population in a gigantic moving vehicle. The diplomat explains that the vehicle is powered by an automatic generator whose energy must be consumed to prevent overheating. When they arrive at the border barrier of another country, the general refuses permission to continue. Undaunted, the traveling country breaks through the defensive wall using a powerful laser and crosses the green pastures. The local military fails to penetrate the vehicle's armor and in frustration they target a mural painted on the side by the children of the traveling country. Kino helps the diplomat and president by shooting the targeting binoculars and missiles. Kino realizes her hosts could easily conquer other countries, but the diplomat desires only to travel the world in peace. As Kino and Hermes leave the traveling country, Hermes remarks on the "bothersome countries", both the traveling country that causes destruction with its massive tracks and the border barrier country that charges a high toll for travelers to pass through the land. Kino is embarrassed when Hermes mentions that the children of the traveling country might paint a new mural depicting her heroism.
17	4	"Ship Country —On the Beach—"; Transliteration: "Fune no Kuni" (Japanese: 船の国)	October 27, 2017
Shizu and Riku board a giant ship headed to the Western continent, though Shizu refuses comfortable accommodation in exchange for overseeing the inhabitants offered by the ship's cloaked rulers, the Tower Clan. Shizu and Riku explore the ship while being guided by a quiet girl named Ti, who becomes Shizu's companion. The ship starts to shake violently, and Shizu discovers that 143 sections of the ship are in disrepair. Shizu later faces Kino who took an overseeing position, but Kino joins Shizu to confront the Tower Clan who makes Shizu the leader before vanishing. After the ship is run ashore, Kino, Hermes, Shizu, Riku and Ti are left behind on the beach while the protesting inhabitants prepare to depart instead. When Ti stabs Shizu after he suggests for her to board the ship, Hermes reveals that the Tower Clan was the ship's artificial intelligence, while Ti was abandoned by her traveler parents and rejected by the ship's original population. The Tower Clan tried for years to land ashore, but the inhabitants had lost the desire and ability to live on land. Shizu forgives Ti and asks her to follow him. Kino parts ways from Shizu after she fixes his wounds.
18	5	"Country of Liars —Waiting for You—"; Transliteration: "Usotsukitachi no Kuni" (Japanese: 嘘つき達の国)	November 3, 2017
Kino and Hermes visit a country's memorial hall to a modest traveler who overthrew its corrupt government and became its first president. They see the former traveler's belongings inside, including his motorrad, which depressingly tells them that it wants to be ridden or at least destroyed, but Kino declines both requests. As she leaves, Kino encounters a young boy who wishes to travel, and she suggests that he should talk to the motorrad inside the memorial hall. At the next country, Kino is approached by a former policeman inquiring about his lover who left five years ago. Over dinner, Kino is told that the former policeman led a revolution to remove a tyrant, in which he killed the royal family by destroying their car. However, he learned that his lover was a princess who died in the blast. Unable to accept her death, he was told that she had gone on a journey, a lie maintained by the whole country to protect him. His traveling housekeeper is later revealed to be the former princess, as the people killed in the blast were body doubles. Before Kino and Hermes depart, the former policeman is happy with the life he has chosen.
19	6	"Before the Clouds —Eye-opener—"; Transliteration: "Kumo no Mae de" (Japanese: 雲の前で)	November 10, 2017
Two merchants accompanied by a caravan set up camp in a mountainous region, where they mistreat an orphaned female slave purchased from a religious country in exchange for goods. Despite this, the slave does not resent their behavior as people in her country were taught to respect others. As the travelers eat their soup, the slave realizes that some picked herbs are poisonous, but is unable to warn them in time. A young master throws a stone at her, spilling her soup onto the ground. Feeling helpless, she wails in anguish, causing the travelers to die from food poisoning. However, the older merchant barely survives as he feels sympathetic for her, eventually unshackling her and tricking her into taking his life. In one of the trucks, a small motor scooter named Sou calls out to the slave, consoling her over the deaths of the travelers and telling her to live rather than die. Kino and Hermes later arrive, and Kino deduces the nature of their deaths from the poisonous herbs growing nearby. Years later, Sou reveals the unnamed slave was able to let go of her past, struck it rich and became a photographer, now named Photo.
20	7	"Historic Country —Don't Look Back!—"; Transliteration: "Rekishi no Aru Kuni" (Japanese: 歴史のある国)	November 17, 2017
As Kino and Hermes approach a country with a tall clock tower, Kino recalls a story that her Master told about when she was a young traveler. In the past, the Master entered the same country with her Partner, planning to sell gems to buy supplies. However, her Partner was arrested by the corrupt police force for selling drugs and his possessions were confiscated. The Master agreed to leave the country after failing to bribe the police chief to obtain his release, but she later returned at night to create a diversion and release her Partner from prison. Going on the offensive, the Master and her Partner turn the top of the clock tower into a hide site, where they incapacitate retreating police officers in the legs with bullets. After a siege of three days, the police force surrendered and asked them to leave, but the Master only agreed after receiving a considerable ransom. Back in the present, Kino and Hermes arrive in the country and find a plaque near the clock tower, where an old man sporting a cane explains that it commemorates a pair of brave heroes who saved the country from the corrupt police force.
21	8	"Country of Radio Waves —Not Guilty—"; Transliteration: "Denpa no Kuni" (Japanese: 電波の国)	November 24, 2017
Looking to settle down rather than keep traveling, Shizu, Riku and Ti arrive in a dune buggy at a seemingly promising country after some investigation. While exploring the countryside, they are confronted by a murderer, but Shizu subdues him. The sheriff later informs Shizu that devices were implanted inside the heads of slaves to control them using radio waves centuries ago, and the citizens believe that the active radio outposts sometimes cause violent acts against one's will. Shizu skeptically volunteers to destroy a nearby radio outpost but finds it in complete ruins. After he takes photo evidence, the citizens are unable to accept that people have acted on their own impulses. This is interrupted when Ti grabs a baby from a mom and threatens to explode a hand grenade. Shizu then pretends to be affected by radio waves and takes the sheriff hostage. Shizu, Riku and Ti leave and release the sheriff beyond the border. The trio then arrive in a country with a high crime rate. While Shizu heads out for a job, Riku spends time with Ti, which includes eating a croissant with jam and going out for a long walk together, thereby becoming closer friends.
22	9	"Various Countries"; Transliteration: "Iroiro na Kuni" (Japanese: いろいろな国)	December 1, 2017
Two bandits watch for easy travelers to rob, but the elder bandit dissuades the younger bandit from targeting Shizu then Kino, explaining that the most seemingly vulnerable ones are the most dangerous. Kino speaks with a former president about his country's accruing virtue point system, in which citizens are rewarded for their good deeds, deducted for their criminal acts and jailed if the points fall below zero. In a country of restaurants, a group of chefs adopts spicy and mild versions of fried chicken as their country's specialties, after Kino was mistaken for a famous wandering chef. Shizu, Riku and Ti visit a country where people write down their wishes on paper and stick them on statues. After Ti writes down a wish for everyone's wishes to come true, the people praises her generosity, despite her disbelief in wishes coming true. Kino later visits a country, but suddenly finds herself leaving it three days later with no memories. Based on a letter in her saddlebag that she wrote to herself, this country is very secretive and demands that all visiting travelers must take an amnesia pill to forget their time there, which really frustrates Kino.
23	10	"Kind Country —Tomorrow Never Comes.—"; Transliteration: "Yasashī Kuni" (Japanese: 優しい国)	December 8, 2017
Curious to enter a country known among travelers for its terrible reputation, Kino and Hermes are warmly welcomed, much to their surprise. Kino befriends a girl named Sakura, whose parents own an inexpensive inn. While Sakura takes Kino and Hermes on a grand tour of the country, they visit a Persuader Smith who services Kino's gun for free and even gives her a semi-automatic pistol. Sakura takes Kino to see a play about how her ancestors settled in the heavily forested land. Later on, Sakura shares her future dreams of becoming an innkeeper and tour guide. Kino considers staying longer after a couple marries, but the gate guard reminds her of the time limit. The citizens see her off when she leaves, and Kino remarks how different the country turned out to be. That evening, Kino camps on a ridge and watches in horror as a pyroclastic flow engulfs the land. She then reads a letter given to her, explaining that the people knew of the impending destruction but decided to stay in the place that they were raised and always cherished, and treated Kino kindly so that at least one person would have positive memories of their country.
24	11	"Country of Adults —Natural Rights—"; Transliteration: "Otona no Kuni" (Japanese: 大人の国)	December 15, 2017
Kino and Hermes lie in a field of crimson flowers, where Kino thinks back to when she was eleven years old, but she forgot her original name, which was that of a flower which could easily be turned into an insult. In the past, she met the unassuming traveler Kino and took him to her family's inn to stay for a few days where he repaired an old motorcycle in the basement, and they named it Hermes. She explained that children on their twelfth birthday undergo an operation to become a hardworking adult in the country. The original Kino gives her a change of heart when she expresses her love of singing. On the day before the operation, she wished if there was an alternative way, only to bring shame to the family. After the original Kino was told to leave, he stepped in front to protect her from being killed by her father. As her father pulled the knife from the original Kino's lifeless body to kill her, Hermes suggested that she ride away instead. After fleeing the country to a field of crimson flowers, she took on the original Kino's name as her own.
25	12	"Fields of Sheep —Stray Army—"; Transliteration: "Hitsuji-tachi no Sougen" (Japanese: 羊たちの草原)	December 22, 2017
As Kino and Hermes travel along the countryside, they are soon chased by a flock of wild sheep, ending up at the edge of a ravine. Forced to leave Hermes behind, Kino climbs down the ravine then walks upstream to find a way out, but the wild sheep follow on the plateau above. Kino later exits the ravine and finds the corpse of a traveler beside his off-road vehicle, trapped in the narrowest part of the ravine. She frees the vehicle and drives it back to Hermes. Kino spreads a line of oil around Hermes and sets it aflame, creating a barrier of fire. After shooting all the sheep within the barrier, she builds a ramp to safely jump across the ravine with Hermes. When Kino arrives at the front gates of the next country, she confirms to the immigration officer that she ran into sheep on her way. The immigration officer says that the sheep were bred for fighting but released after the practice was stopped. Kino later decides to take a long nap, declaring the end of her journey, much to Hermes's surprise. Kino explains that a new journey will begin after she awakes.

== See also ==
- List of Kino's Journey light novels
