= Allison & Lillia =

2008 anime television series

- Allison & Lillia logo

アリソンとリリア (Arison to Riria)
- Genre: Adventure, Romance
- Anime television series
- Directed by: Masayoshi Nishida
- Written by: Touko Machida
- Music by: Shūsei Murai
- Studio: Madhouse
- Licensed by: NA: Sentai Filmworks; (expired)
- Original network: NHK BS2
- Original run: April 3, 2008 – October 2, 2008
- Episodes: 26
- Other
- Allison (first novel series); Lillia and Treize (second novel series); Meg and Seron (third novel series)
- icon

Allison & Lillia (アリソンとリリア, Arison to Riria) is a Japanese anime television series adapted from the light novel series Allison and Lillia and Treize by Keiichi Sigsawa. The anime, produced and animated by Madhouse, and directed by Masayoshi Nishida, aired in Japan on the NHK BS2 television channel between April 3 and October 2, 2008, and ran for 26 episodes. The first half of the anime covered the Allison novels, while the second half covered the Lillia and Treize novels.

== Plot ==
Allison & Lillia's story covers the story from the Allison light novels for the first half of the series, and switches to the story from the Lillia and Treize light novels for the second half. Allison & Lillia is set in a world with one continent split down the middle from north-south by the towering Central Mountains, and the vast Lutoni River. Due to the geography, two cultures developed on either side of the divide. The eastern region is formally known as the Roxcheanuk Confederation, though more commonly known as Roxche (ロクシェ, Rokushe). The entire region comprises sixteen countries which all speak a common language. The western region is formally known as the United Kingdom of Bezel Iltoa, though better known as Sou Beil (スー･ベー･イル, Sū Bē Iru). This region comprises the two kingdoms of Bezel and Iltoa which both serve to bring together a small number of countries under the same common language as with that of the eastern region. There are more blond people in the west than in the east. At the time the story begins, it is 3287 on the fictional universe's World Calendar during summer. By this time, the two regions have been at war on and off for most of history, with the most recent hostilities breaking out some thirty-five years prior to the start of the series. An armistice has been in effect for the past thirty years, with only one major conflict during this time, creating a buffer zone 30 kilometers (19 mi) on either side of the river. The industry and technology of the world are roughly equivalent to the 1930s.

The first half of the story centers around Allison Whittington, a young blonde pilot in the Roxche Air Force who has experience with biplanes. She comes to visit her good friend Wil Schultz (short for Wilhelm, so pronounced Vill) during his summer vacation at Rowe Sneyum Senior School's dormitory after being away for six months. Wil, who resides in Roxche, enjoys reading books, has a photographic memory, and is a good marksman. The two participate in three adventures over a period of a year where they meet new people and form important bonds.

The second half of the story starts about fifteen years after the conclusion of the first half. The story centers around Lilliane Schultz, or Lillia for short, the daughter of Allison and Wil. Wil has in this time assumed a new identity, Travas, under the Sou Beil military, though still dates Allison. Lillia's companion is her childhood friend Treize, son of Carr Benedict and Fiona; Treize has a twin sister named Merielle. Lillia's and Treize's adventure together begins during her summer vacation from school.

== Characters ==
=== Main characters ===
Allison Whittington (アリソン・ウィッティングトン, Arison Wittinguton)
Voiced by: Nana Mizuki (young), Hōko Kuwashima (adult)
Allison is a pilot of the Roxche air force and daughter of a military officer who died during the war, she was raised in an orphanage along with Wil. An impulsive, daring and somewhat tomboyish girl (not to mention her well-above average gymnastics) who has a talent for getting herself in trouble. Though being in the military, she is not above bending the rules (and the occasional mischief) to help others, and to get things done. Wilhelm becomes the receiving end of her bad sleeping habits on a few occasions when they have to share a single bed out of circumstance. She also has jealousy fits when she sees how close how Benedict and Fiona are to each other, while on her end, she tries so hard to do the same with Wilhelm to no avail. In the second half of the story, Allison gives birth to Lillia with Wil, but the latter had to fake is death and change his name due to becoming a secret agent. She still dates Wil, but has kept his true identity a secret from Lillia.
Wilhelm Schultz (ヴィルヘルム・シュルツ, Viruherumu Shurutsu)
Voiced by: Motoko Kumai
Allison's childhood friend. A scholar who has the ability to memorize things instantly and also is skilled at firearms. Wil does not share Allison's sense for adventure, but is usually dragged along by her. While Allison is physically more apt and spontaneous than he is, Wilhelm brings in the level-headedness and wits during their adventures. Some time after marrying Allison, Wil is scouted by her father to become a secret agent just like him, thus he fakes his own death and assumes another identity under the alias Travas, with only Allison and a few other individuals knowing the truth about him.
Carr Benedict (カー・ベネディクト, Kā Benedikuto)
Voiced by: Kōichi Yamadera
A handsome, flirtatious pilot in the Sou Beil air force who becomes friends with Allison and Wil, and always ready to help them when needed. By Allison and Wil's request, Benedict takes all credit for the discovery of the mural proving the common origin of Sou Beil and Roxche, thus becoming known as a hero. After joining Allison and Wil's effort to help Fiona reclaim the throne of Ikstova, Benedict starts a relationship with her, leading to their marriage.
Fiona (フィオナ)
Voiced by: Mamiko Noto
The sole survivor of the small country of Ikstova's royal family, who decided to leave her secluded life after meeting Allison, Wil and Benedict, assuming her rightful place at Ikstova's throne with their help. She has a great passion for photography.
Lillia (リリア, Riria)
Voiced by: Nana Mizuki
Lillia is Allison's and Wil's daughter. She is shy of being called by her full name: Lilliane Acacia Corazón Whittington Schultz. She is, as her mother mutters in a monologue, as dense as Wilhelm when it comes to romance.
Treize (トレイズ, Toreizu)
Voiced by: Hiroyuki Yoshino
Son, and one of the fraternal twin children of Carr Benedict and Fiona, and Lillia's closest friend. Looks to form a relationship with Lillia similar to that which Allison and Wil had in their younger days. Being a son of Fiona, he is also the prince of Ikstova, though Lillia is unaware of this and only sees him as a childhood friend. He is worldly and does not really care for his royal heritage, and wishes that he can be like a normal civilian, and not be a subject to political favors among royal families.

=== Other characters ===
Corazón Muto (コラソン・ムート, Korason Mūto)
Voiced by: Toshiko Fujita
The old woman at Future House who took care of orphaned children in Roxche, including Wil and Allison. Originally from Sou Beil, her humanitarian efforts on the other side of the river earned her the scorn of her compatriots. As a result of her care, both Allison and Wil show compassion for both sides in the conflict, and can speak the language of Sou Beil.
Merielle (メリエル, Merieru)
Voiced by: Chiwa Saitō
Daughter of Carr Benedict and Fiona, and Treize's fraternal twin sister, she is the official heir to the throne of Ikstova. Has a pushy and headstrong personality similar to Allison, which she shows even in front of her own parents. She has a sharp tooth at the corner of her mouth that stands out when she talks.
Travas (トラヴァス, Toravasu)
Voiced by: Toshiyuki Morikawa
The adopted son of Radia, Travas is a major in the Sou Beil armed forces, stationed in Roxche as a diplomatic liaison. He is involved in a relationship with Allison, who addressed him as her boyfriend. Travas is, in fact, Wilhelm Schultz. He knows of Treize's royal heritage and even greeted him as "Your Highness" behind Lillia's back.
Ann
She is introduced later in series, and is the right hand woman in Travas' team under the alias Ax. She is talented with the gun, maybe even more so than Major Travas (Wilhelm). Her father was Captain Grantz, who died in a cave-in while facing Wilheim over the mural. Blaming himself for his death, Travas personally hired Ann so that she would have the best position to exact her revenge, for which he did not plan on stopping. Ann was also shocked to learn that Maj. Travas chose "duty" over his family.
Mathilda (Hilda)
The queen of Sou Beil, she is kindhearted and perceptive. She is lonesome as she does not have many close friends, though Merielle is seen to be one of those few. Treize was chosen as the primary candidate to be Mathilda's fiancé.
Captain Gratz
Introduced earlier in the series, he is a soldier from Sou Beil. He died trying to thwart Allison, Wil, and Carr Benedict from revealing the mural. His death was caused by the injury Wil inflicted on his shoulder; he ended shooting up at the cave's ceiling and being crushed by the rocks that fell. His daughter is Ann.

== Production ==
The animated television series Allison & Lillia is directed by Masayoshi Nishida, and produced by Madhouse in collaboration with Tezuka Productions, along with Geneon which is in charge of music. The anime shares its title as a combination with the light novel series Allison, and Lillia and Treize, which the anime is based on. The series aired between April 3 and October 2, 2008, on NHK in Japan, and ran for 26 episodes. The anime has been licensed by Sentai Filmworks and distributor Section23 Films released part one of the series on May 17, 2011, and released part two on July 12, 2011.

== Music ==
Two pieces of theme music are used for the anime; one opening theme, one ending theme. The opening theme is "Tameiki no Hashi" (溜め息の橋) by the Kuricorder Quartet and Shione Yukawa, and the ending theme is "Sayonara no Omajinai" (サヨナラのおまじない) by the Kuricorder Quartet and Sō Matsumoto. Both singles for the two themes were released by Geneon on June 25, 2008. That same day, an image song album will be released containing short audio dramas and character songs sung by Nana Mizuki and Motoko Kumai who play Allison and Wil in the anime.

== Reception ==
Writing in the third edition of The Anime Encyclopedia (2015), Jonathan Clements and Helen McCarthy described Allison & Lillia as "true family entertainment, intelligent and attractive", noting that it shared the retro aesthetic of Keiichi Sigsawa's earlier Kino's Journey. They praised the characterization and voice acting, which they considered sufficiently strong to compensate for several plot holes and animation deficiencies, particularly problems with perspective and the integration of computer-generated and traditional animation. They also praised the action sequences and musical score, finding the series more reminiscent of classic anime from the 1970s and 1980s than of contemporary television anime.
