= List of Kino's Journey light novels =

First volume of the original Japanese release of Kino's Journey

Kino's Journey is a Japanese light novel series written by Keiichi Sigsawa, and illustrated by Kohaku Kuroboshi. The series premiered in the sixth volume of Dengeki hp on March 17, 2000. The first volume of the series was published on July 10, 2000, under ASCII Media Works' Dengeki Bunko publishing imprint. As of October 2017, around 8.2 million copies of the novels had been sold in Japan. 24 volumes have been published as of November 2025.

Tokyopop licensed the novels for an English language release in North America. The first volume was published on October 3, 2006. Tokyopop released the series under its rōmaji title of Kino no Tabi and rearranged the chapters of the first volume. Due to issues with the licensor, the remaining volumes were canceled. The light novel series has also been translated into Chinese, Korean, and German. An additional volume entitled Kino's Journey -the Beautiful World- Country of Theater -Kino- (キノの旅 -the Beautiful World- 劇場の国 -KINO-, Kino no Tabi -the Beautiful World- Gekijō no Kuni -KINO-) was released as a promotional gift for the second animated movie.

A spin-off of the regular series under the title Gakuen Kino was also created. The first volume of the spin-off series was released on July 10, 2006, under Dengeki Bunko; the fifth volume was released on July 8, 2011. Volume six was released in October 2019 and seven in May 2021. The series is a collection of parodies originally published in three spin-off magazines of Dengeki hp: Dengeki p, Dengeki h, and Dengeki hpa. The spin-off features Kino as a magical girl in a school setting.

== Light novels ==
=== Kino's Journey ===
No.	Original release date	Original ISBN	English release date	English ISBN
01	July 10, 2000	978-4-8402-1585-5	October 10, 2006 (Tokyopop)	978-1-59816-455-8 (Tokyopop)
Prologue. "Amidst the Forest ･ b" (「森の中で ･ b」, "Mori no Naka de ･ b") —Lost in the Forest ･ b—: 1. "Land of Visible Pain" (「人の痛みが分かる国」, "Hito no Itami ga Wakaru Kuni") —I See You.—; 2. "Land of the Majority" (「多数決の国」, "Tasūketsu no Kuni") —Ourselfish—; 3. "Three Men Along the Rails" (「レールの上の三人の男」, "Rēru no Ue no Sannin no Otoko") —On the Rails—; 4. "Coliseum" (「コロシアム」, "Koroshiamu") —Avengers—; 5. "Land of Adults" (「大人の国」, "Otona no Kuni") —Natural Rights—; 6. "A Peaceful Land" (「平和な国」, "Heiwana Kuni") —Mother's Love—; Epilogue. "Amidst the Forest ･ a" (「森の中で ･ a」, "Mori no Naka de ･ a") —Lost in the Forest ･ a—
02	October 10, 2000	978-4-8402-1632-6	—	—
Frontispiece. "A Story of a Sniper" (「狙撃兵の話」, "Sogekihei no Hanashi") —Fatalism— Prologue. "Amidst the Desert ･ b" (「砂漠の真ん中で ･ b」, "Sabaku no Mannaka de ･ b") —Beginner's Luck ･ b—: 1. "A Tale of Feeding Off Others" (「人を喰った話」, "Hito o Kutta Hanashi") —I Want to Live.—; 2. "Overprotection" (「過保護」, "Kahogo") —Do You Need It?—; 3. "Land of Wizards" (「魔法使いの国」, "Mahōtsukai no Kuni") —Potentials of Magic—; 4. "Land of Free Press" (「自由報道の国」, "Jiyū Hōdō no Kuni") —Believers—; 5. "A Picture's Tale" (「絵の話」, "E no Hanashi") —Happiness—; 6. "Return" (「帰郷」, "Kikyō") —"She" is Waiting For You.—; 7. "Land of Books" (「本の国」, "Hon no Kuni") —Nothing Is Written!—; 8. "A Kind Land" (「優しい国」, "Yasashii Kuni") —Tomorrow Never Comes.—; Epilogue. "Amidst the Desert ･ a" (「砂漠の真ん中で ･ a」, "Sabaku no Mannaka de ･ a") —Beginner's Luck ･ a— Special. "Continued: A Picture's Tale" (「続 ･ 絵の話」, "Zoku ･ E no Hanashi") —Anonymous Pictures—
03	January 10, 2001	978-4-8402-1709-5	—	—
Frontispiece. "The Land of Love and Peace" (「愛と平和の国」, "Ai to Heiwa no Kuni") —Power Play— Prologue. "Amidst the Clouds ･ b" (「雲の中で ･ b」, "Kumo no Naka de ･ b") —Blinder ･ b—: 1. "A Land Without Borders" (「城壁のない国」, "Jōheki no Nai Kuni") —Designated Area—; 2. "Power of Persuasion" (「説得力」, "Settokuryoku") —Persuader—; 3. "The Land of Identical Faces" (「同じ顔の国」, "Onaji Kao no Kuni") —HACCP—; 4. "A Tale of a Mechanical Doll" (「機械人形の話」, "Kikai Ningyō no Hanashi") —One-way Mission—; 5. "A Land not Permitting Discrimination" (「差別を許さない国」, "Sabetsu o Yurusanai Kuni") —True Blue Sky—; 6. "A Finished Tale" (「終わってしまった話」, "Owatteshimatta Hanashi) —Ten Years After—; Epilogue. "Amidst the Clouds ･ a" (「雲の中で ･ a」, "Kumo no Naka de ･ a") —Blinder ･ a—
04	July 10, 2001	978-4-8402-1844-3	—	—
Prologue. "Amidst a Sea of Red ･ b" (「紅い海の真ん中で ･ b」, "Kurenai Umi no Mannaka de ･ b") —Blooming Prairie ･ b—: 1. "Land with a Statue" (「像のある国」, "Zō no Aru Kuni") —Angel?—; 2. "×××××" -Solo-; 3. "Land of Two People" (「二人の国」, "Futari no Kuni") —Even a Dog Doesn't Eat—; 4. "Tradition" (「伝統」, "Dentō") —Tricksters—; 5. "The Land Without the Need for Work" (「仕事をしなくていい国」, "Shigoto o Shinakute Ii Kuni") —Workable—; 6. "A Land Divided" (「分かれている国」, "Wakareteiru Kuni) —World Divided—; 7. "Grapes" (「ぶどう」, "Budō") —On Duty—; 8. "Land of Acknowledgment" (「認めている国」, "Mitometeiru Kuni") —A Vote—; 9. "A Tale of Extortion" (「たかられた話」, "Takarareta Hanashi) —Bloodsuckers—; 10. "Land of Bridges" (「橋の国」, "Hashi no Kuni") —Their Line—; 11. "The Tower Country" (「塔の国」, "Tō no Kuni") —Free lance—; Epilogue. "Amidst a Sea of Red ･ a" (「紅い海の真ん中で ･ a」, "Kurenai Umi no Mannaka de ･ a") —Blooming Prairie ･ a—
05	January 10, 2002	978-4-8402-2013-2	—	—
Prologue. "Amidst the Setting Sun ･ b" (「夕日の中で ･ b」, "Yūhi no Naka de ･ b") —Will ･ b—: 1. "Reminiscence" (「あの時のこと」, "Ano Toki no Koto") —Blue Rose—; 2. "Land Permitting Murder" (「人を殺すことができる国」, "Hito o Korosu Koto ga Dekiru Kuni") —Jungle's Rule—; 3. "A Tale of a Vendor" (「店の話」, "Ten no Hanashi") —For Sale—; 4. "Land of Heroes" (「英雄達の国」, "Eiyūtachi no Kuni") —No Hero—; 5. "Land of Heroes" (「英雄達の国」, "Eiyūtachi no Kuni") —Seven Heroes—; 6. "A Tranquil Land" (「のどかな国」, "Nodokana Kuni") —Jog Trot—; 7. "Land of Prophecies" (「予言の国」, "Yogen no Kuni") —We NO The Future.—; 8. "Bodyguards" (「用心棒」, "Yōjinbō") —Stand-bys—; 9. "A Tale of a Salt Field" (「塩の平原の話」, "Shio no Heigen no Hanashi") —Family Business—; 10. "Land of Illness" (「病気の国」, "Byōki no Kuni") —For You—; Epilogue. "Amidst the Setting Sun ･ a" (「夕日の中で ･ a」, "Yūhi no Naka de ･ a") —Will ･ a—
06	August 10, 2002	978-4-8402-2155-9	—	—
Frontispiece. "A Land of No Admittance" (「入れない国」, "Irenai Kuni") —Reasonable— Frontispiece. "An Unbiased Tale" (「中立な話」, "Chūritsu no Hanashi") —All Alone— Frontispiece. "A Tale of a Tank" (「戦車の話」, "Sensha no Hanashi") —Life Goes On.— Prologue. "A Pledge ･ b" (「誓い ･ b」, "Chikai ･ b") —a Kitchen Knife ･ b—: 1. "Her Journey" (「彼女の旅」, "Kanojo no Tabi") —Chances—; 2. "Her Journey" (「彼女の旅」, "Kanojo no Tabi") —Love and Bullets—; 3. "Land of Fireworks" (「花火の国」, "Hanabi no Kuni") —Fire at Will!—; 4. "A Land with an Elder" (「長のいる国」, "Osa no Iru Kuni") —I Need You.—; 5. "A Land that Never Forgets" (「忘れない国」, "Wasurenai Kuni") —Not Again—; 6. "A Safe Country" (「安全な国」, "Anzenna Kuni") —For His Safety—; 7. "During the Journey" (「旅の途中」, "Tabi no Tochū") —Intermission—; 8. "The Meaning of Blessing" (「祝福のつもり」, "Shukufuku no Tsumori") —How Much Do I Pay For?—; Epilogue. "A Pledge ･ a" (「誓い ･ a」, "Chikai ･ a") —a Kitchen Knife ･ a—
07	June 10, 2003	978-4-8402-2386-7	—	—
Prologue. "To Do Something ･ b" (「何かをするために ･ b」, "Nanika o Suru Tame ni ･ b") —life goes on. ･ b—: 1. "An Aggressive Land" (「迷惑な国」, "Meiwakuna Kuni") —Leave Only Footsteps!—; 2. "A Land of Love" (「ある愛の国」, "Aru Ai no Kuni") —Stray King—; 3. "Along a River" (「川原にて」, "Kawara nite") —Intermission—; 4. "Winter Tale" (「冬の話」, "Fuyu no Hanashi") —D—; 5. "A Tale of Teatime in a Forest" (「森の中のお茶会の話」, "Mori no Naka no Ochakai no Hanashi") —Thank You—; 6. "Land of Liars" (「嘘つき達の国」, "Usotsukitachi no Kuni") —Waiting For You—; Epilogue. "To Do Something ･ a" (「何かをするために ･ a」, "Nanika o Suru Tame ni ･ a") —life goes on. ･ a—
08	October 10, 2004	978-4-8402-2832-9	—	—
Frontispiece. "Land of Roads" (「道の国」, "Michi no Kuni") —Go West!— Frontispiece. "A Land Without Crime" (「悪いことはできない国」, "Warui Koto wa Dekinai Kuni") —Black box— Prologue. "On the Beach, A Beginning and an End of a Journey" (「渚にて 旅の始まりと終わり」, "Nagisa nite Tabi no Hajimari to Owari") —On the Beach ･ b—: 1. "A Land with History" (「歴史のある国」, "Rekishi no Aru Kuni") —Don't Look Back!—; 2. "A Story with Love" (「愛のある話」, "Ai no Aru Hanashi") —Dinner Party—; 3. "Land of Radios" (「ラジオな国」, "Rajiona Kuni") —Entertainer—; 4. "A Land Saved" (「救われた国」, "Sukuwareta Kuni") —Confession—; Epilogue. "The Ship Country" (「船の国」, "Fune no Kuni") —On the Beach ･ a—
09	October 10, 2005	978-4-8402-3172-5	—	—
Frontispiece. "Exorbitant People" (「なってないひとたち」, "Nattenai Hitotachi") —Traveler's Tale— Frontispiece. "Story of a Wall" (「城壁の話」, "Jōheki no Hanashi") —Sweet Home— Prologue. "Amidst Sorrow ･ b" (「悲しみの中で ･ b」, "Kanashimi no Naka de ･ b") —Yearning ･ b—: 1. "Land of Records" (「記録の国」, "Kiroku no Kuni") —His Record—; 2. "Evening of Good People" (「いい人達の夕べ」, "Ii Hitotachi no Yūbe") —Innocence—; 3. "A Writer's Journey" (「作家の旅」, "Sakka no Tabi") —Editor's Travels—; 4. "A Land of Electromagnetic Waves" (「電波の国」, "Denpa no Kuni") —Not Guilty—; 5. "A Land of Diaries" (「日記の国」, "Nikki no Kuni") —Historians—; 6. "The Land of Natural Preservation" (「自然保護の国」, "Shizenhogo no Kuni") —Let It Be!—; 7. "Land of Merchants" (「商人の国」, "Shōnin no Kuni") —Professionals—; 8. "The Land of Killing" (「殺す国」, "Korosu Kuni") —Clearance—; 9. "Continued: A Tale of a Tank" (「続 ･ 戦車の話」, "Zoku ･ Sensha no Hanashi") —Spirit—; 10. "Old Tales" (「むかしの話」, "Mukashi no Hanashi") —Tea Talks—; 11. "Power of Persuasion II" (「説得力II」, "Settokuryoku II") —Persuader II—; Epilogue. "Amidst Sorrow ･ a" (「悲しみの中で ･ a」, "Kanashimi no Naka de ･ a") —Yearning ･ a—
10	October 10, 2006	978-4-8402-3580-8	—	—
Frontispiece. "Land of Pets" (「ペットの国」, "Petto no Kuni") —apPETite— Frontispiece. "Ti's Wish" (「ティーの願い」, "Tī no Negai") —Get Real!— Prologue. "A Man's Journey ･ b" (「在る男の旅 ･ b」, "Aru Otoko no Tabi ･ b") —Life is a Journey, and Vice Versa. ･ b—: 1. "Interview Land" (「インタビューの国」, "Intabyū no Kuni") —Out of the Question—; 2. "A Tale of Braggarts" (「ホラ吹き達の話」, "Horafukitachi no Hanashi") —Fantasy—; 3. "Land of Protection" (「保護の国」, "Hogo no Kuni") —Meritocracy—; 4. "Land of Telephone Poles" (「電柱の国」, "Denchū no Kuni") —Transmission—; 5. "In a Place Like This" (「こんなところにある国」, "Konna Tokoro ni Aru Kuni") —Preface—; 6. "Ti's Day" (「ティーの一日」, "Tī no Ichinichi") —a Day in the Girl's Life—; 7. "Land With a Singer" (「歌姫のいる国」, "Utahime no Iru Kuni") —Unsung Divas—; Epilogue. "A Man's Journey ･ a" (「在る男の旅 ･ a」, "Aru Otoko no Tabi ･ a") —Life is a Journey, and Vice Versa. ･ a—
11	October 10, 2007	978-4-8402-4025-3	—	—
Frontispiece. "Land of Children" (「子供の国」, "Kodomo no Kuni") —Burn Up— Frontispiece. "Land with a Flower Field" (「花畑の国」, "Hanabatake no Kuni") —Flower Arrangement— Prologue. "Camera Land ･ b" (「カメラの国 ･ b」, "Kamera no Kuni") —Picturesque ･ b—: 1. "Connected Land" (「つながっている国」, "Tsunagatteiru Kuni") —Stand Alone—; 2. "Land of Disappointment" (「失望の国」, "Shitsubou no Kuni") —Hope Against Hope—; 3. "Land of Ajin (etc)" (「アジン（略）の国」, "Ajin (ryaku) no Kuni") —With You—; 4. "Land Without Borders" (「国境のない国」, "Kokkyou no nai Kuni") —Asylum—; 5. "Land of School" (「学校の国」, "Gakkou no Kuni") —Assignment—; 6. "A Tale of Roads" (「道の話」, "Michi no Hanashi") —Passage—; 7. "A Tale of Fighting People" (「戦う人の話」, "Tatakau Hito no Hanashi") —Reasonable—; Epilogue. "Camera Land ･ a" (「カメラの国 ･ a」, "Kamera no Kuni") —Picturesque ･ a—
12	October 10, 2008	978-4-04-867263-4	—	—
Under the cover. "A Tale of Donations" (「寄付の話」, "Kifu no Hanashi") —How's Tricks?— Frontispiece. "A Tale of Bandits" (「山賊達の話」, "Sanzokutachi no Hanashi") —Can You Imagine!— Frontispiece. "A Country of Conning" (「パクリの国」, "Pakuri no Kuni") —I Have Ever Seen Before.— Frontispiece. "Wish" (「願い」, "Negai") Prologue. "Amidst Happiness ･ b" (「幸せの中で ･ b」, "Shiawase no Naka de ･ b") —Birth ･ b—: 1. "Land of Justice" (「正義の国」, "Seigi no Kuni") —Idiots—; 2. "The Country to Which the Devil Came" (「悪魔が来た国」, "Akuma ga Kita Kuni") —Talk of the Devil.—; 3. "Searching Land" (「求める国」, "Motomeru Kuni") —Common Sense—; 4. "Land of Sundials" (「日時計の国」, "Hidokei no Kuni") —Counter Strike—; 5. "The Land That Tries" (「努力をする国」, "Doryoku o suru Kuni") —Passage 2—; 6. "Continued: A Tale of Donations" (「続 ･ 寄付の話」, "Zoku ･ Kifu no Hanashi") —How's Tricks?—; 7. "A Tale of Letters" (「手紙の話」, "Tegami no Hanashi") —the Weak Link—; 8. "A Tale of Wagers" (「賭の話」, "Kake no Hanashi") —Which is Which.—; 9. "A Tale Full of Virtue" (「德を積む話」, "Toku o Tsumu Hanashi") —Serious Killer—; 10. "Before the Clouds" (「雲の前で」, "Kumo no Mae de") —Eye-opener—; Epilogue. "Amidst Happiness ･ a" (「幸せの中で ･ a」, "Shiawase no Naka de ･ a") —Birth ･ a—
13	October 10, 2009	978-4-04-868068-4	—	—
Frontispiece. "A Detestable Land" (「嫌いな国」, "Kiraina Kuni") —Abandon Ship!— Frontispiece. "An Amazing Land" (「凄い国」, "Sugoi Kuni") —Nothing Special— Frontispiece. "A Tale of Living People" (「生きている人達の話」, "Ikiteiru Hitotachi no Hanashi") —You Should Be So Lucky.— Prologue. "A Tale of This World ･ b" (「この世界の話 ･ b」, "Kono Sekai no Hanashi ･ b") —It Happens. ･ b—: 1. "A Tale of Olden Days" (「昔の話」, "Mukashi no Hanashi") —Choice—; 2. "Land of Families" (「家族の国」, "Kazoku no Kuni") —Divorce—; 3. "An Unlawful Land" (「違法な国」, "Ihōna Kuni") —Just Imagine It!—; 4. "Land of Travelers" (「旅人の国」, "Tabibito no Kuni") —Last Will—; 5. "A Necessary Land" (「必要な国」, "Hitsuyōna Kuni") —Entertainer—; Epilogue. "A Tale of This World ･ a" (「この世界の話 ･ a」, "Kono Sekai no Hanashi ･ a") —It Happens. ･ a— Special. "Various Tales" (「いろいろな話」, "Iroirona Hanashi") —a Beautiful Dreamer—
14	October 10, 2010	978-4-04-868967-0	—	—
Prologue. "Amidst the Rising Sun ･ b" (「朝日の中で ･ b」, "Asahi no Naka de ･ b") —the Dawn ･ b—: 1. "Land of Cultivation of Aesthetic Sensibility" (「情操教育の国」, "Jōsōkyōiku no Kuni") —Do What We say!—; 2. "Land of Mutterings" (「呟きの国」, "Tsubuyaki no Kuni") —My Daily Life—; 3. "Land of Regulations" (「規制の国」, "Kisei no Kuni") —Unreal Young Man—; 4. "Land of Better Fortune" (「開運の国」, "Kaiun no Kuni") —The Fifth "C", Cozenage—; 5. "Land of Posthumous Works" (「遺作の国」, "Isaku no Kuni") —Write or Die—; 6. "Land of Ruin" (「亡国の国」, "Bōkoku no Kuni") —Self-destruction—; 7. "Land of Marriage" (「結婚の国」, "Kekkon no Kuni") —Testament—; 8. "Land of Parasites" (「寄生虫の国」, "Sekiichū no Kuni") —Cure—; 9. "A Discriminatory Land" (「差別をする国」, "Sabetsu o Suru Kuni") —We Are NOT Like Us.—; 10. "A Correct Land" (「正しい国」, "Tadashii Kuni") —WAR=We Are Right!—; 11. "Land of Cowards" (「卑怯者の国」, "Hikyōmono no Kuni") —Toss-up—; Epilogue. "Amidst the Rising Sun ･ a" (「朝日の中で ･ a」, "Asahi no Naka de ･ a") —the Dawn ･ a—
15	October 10, 2011	978-4-04-870962-0	—	—
Frontispiece. "A Land Found by Accident" (「見つけてしまった国」, "Mitsuketeshimatta Kuni") —Eureka!— Frontispiece. "A White Land" (「白い国」, "Shiroi Kuni") —Taste!— Prologue. "What it Means to Fight and Die ･ b" (「戦って死ぬということ ･ b」, "Tatakatte Shinu Toiu Koto ･ b") —Order! ･ b—: 1. "Land of Beasts" (「ケダモノの国」, "Kedamono no Kuni") —Standing Beast—; 2. "Land of Mania" (「マニアの国」, "Mania no Kuni") —What I Want & Why I Want—; 3. "A Land with a Past" (「過去のある国」, "Kako no Aru Kuni") —What We Have Taught.—; 4. "Photo's Every Day" (「フォトの日々」, "Foto no Hibi") —the Beautiful Moment—; 5. "Land of Journalists" (「ジャーナリストの国」, "Jānarisuto no Kuni") —How to Be a Liar—; 6. "Land with a Criminal" (「犯人のいる国」, "Hannin no Iru Kuni") —He Had Done It.—; Epilogue. "What it Means to Fight and Die ･ a" (「戦って死ぬということ ･ a」, "Tatakatte Shinu Toiu Koto ･ a") —Order! ･ a—
16	October 10, 2012	978-4-04-886980-5	—	—
Leaflet. "A Tale of Birdcages" (「鳥籠の話」, "Torikago no Hanashi") —Cradle— Frontispiece. "A Land with Day and Night" (「昼と夜がある国」, "Hiru to Yoru ga Aru Kuni") —Counterclockwise— Frontispiece. "A Rolling Land" (「転がっている国」, "Korogatteiru Kuni") —Take Free If You Can!— Prologue. "Land of Love Letters ･ b" (「恋文の国 ･ b」, "Koibumi no Kuni ･ b") —Confession ･ b—: 1. "Land of Corpses" (「死人達の国」, "Shinintachi no Kuni") —Spirits of the Dead—; 2. "A Nurtured Land" (「育てる国」, "Sodateru Kuni") —Stand by me!—; 3. "A Land of Drunken Driving" (「飲酒運転の国」, "Inshuunten no Kuni") —Let's Play the Game!—; 4. "Land of Blood Types" (「血液型の国」, "Ketsuekigata no Kuni") —Blood Typo—; Epilogue. "Land of Love Letters ･ a" (「恋文の国 ･ a」, "Koibumi no Kuni ･ a") —Confession ･ a— Special. "Unseen Truth" (「見えない真実」, "Mienai Shinjitsu") —Family Picture— Special. "Something Left Behind" (「残されたもの」, "Nokosareta Mono") —Return—
17	October 10, 2013	978-4-04-866021-1	—	—
Frontispiece. "Fashion Country" (「ファッションの国」, "Fasshon no Kuni") —Fine Feathers Make Fine Birds— Prologue. "Land of Passage ･ b" (「渡す国 ･ b」, "Watasu Kuni ･ b") —Messengers ･ b— Frontispiece. "Land of Play" (「遊んでいる国」, "Asondeiru Kuni") —Invention—: 1. "Tale of Travelers" (「旅人達の話」, "Tabibito-tachi no Hanashi") —Kino & Hermes—; 2. "Land of Destruction of Nature" (「自然破壊の国」, "Shizenhakai no Kuni") —Human Nature—; 3. "Land of Clocks" (「時計の国」, "Tokei no Kuni") —Memento Mori—; 4. "Left-Handed Country" (「左利きの国」, "Hidarikiki no Kuni") —Do the RIGHT Thing!—; 5. "A Broken Land" (「割れた国」, "Wareta Kuni") —Trigger Happy—; 6. "Land of Penniless Travelling" (「貧乏旅行の国」, "Binbouryokou no Kuni") —Trouble Writer—; 7. "Tale of Paradise" (「楽園の話」, "Rakuen no Hanashi") —Exile—; 8. "Land of Love Ban" (「恋愛禁止の国」, "Ren'ai Kinshi no Kuni") —the Prohibition—; 9. "Land of Cooking" (「料理の国」, "Ryouri no Kuni") —Original—; 10. "Land of Advertisements" (「広告の国」, "Koukoku no Kuni") —CounterMeasure—; 11. "Land of Railroads" (「鉄道の国」, "Tetsudou no Kuni") —Missing Link—; 12. "The End of a Journey" (「旅の終わり」, "Tabi no Owari") —Kino's Nap—; 13. "A Land Without God' (「神のいない国」, "Kami no Inai Kuni") —Let's Get Hermes—; 14. "Our Country" (「私達の国」, "Watashi-tachi no Kuni") —Welcome!—; Epilogue. "Land of Passage ･ a" (「渡す国 ･ a」, "Watasu Kuni ･ a") —Messengers ･ a—
18	October 10, 2014	978-4-04-866935-1	—	—
Frontispiece. "Land of Cows" (「牛の国」, "Ushi no Kuni") —Fountain— Frontispiece. "Story of a Prairie" (「草原の話」, "Sougen no Hanashi") —Ringer— Prologue. "Land of Kino no Tabi ･ b" (「キノの旅の国・b」, "Kino no Tabi no Kuni ･ b") —Road Show ･ b—: 1. "Land of Sports" (「スポーツの国」, "Supootsu no Kuni") —Winners and Losers—; 2. "A Stopped Land" (「止まった国」, "Tomatta Kuni") —From the Cradle to the Cradle—; 3. "Land of Taxes" (「税金の国」, "Zeikin no Kuni") —Supply and Demand—; 4. "Land of Staple Food" (「主食の国」, "Shushoku no Kuni") —Staple Diet—; 5. "Story of Chocolates" (「チョコレートの話」, "Chokoreeto no Hanashi") —Gift—; 6. "Land of Inheritance" (「遺産の国」, "Isan no Kuni") —Protector—; 7. "Land of Revenge" (「復讐の国, "Fukushuu no Kuni") —Savior—; 8. "Land of Money" (「お金の国」, "Okane no Kuni") —Easy Money—; 9. "My War" (「私の戦争」, "Watashi no Sensou") —Lone Sniper—; Epilogue. "Land of Kino no Tabi ･ a" (「キノの旅の国･a」, "Kino no Tabi no Kuni ･ a") —Road Show ･ a—
19	October 10, 2015	978-4-04-865440-1	—	—
Frontispiece. "A Happy Tale" (「幸せの話」, "Shiawase no Hanashi") —Blue Birds— Frontispiece. "Land of Necklaces" (「首輪の国」, "Kubiwa no Kuni") —What We Need.— Prologue. "An Abandoned Land ･ b" (「捨てる国・b」, "Suteru Kuni ･ b") —Till You Drop ･ b—: 1. "Land of Beautiful Memories" (「美しい記憶の国」, "Utsukushii Kioku no Kuni") —Beautiful Memories—; 2. "Land of Geniuses" (「天才の国」, "Tensai no Kuni") —Finding a Genius—; 3. "Land of Prodigies" (「秀才の国」, "Shuusai no Kuni") —Finding an Error—; 4. "A Protected Land" (「守る国」, "Mamoru Kuni") —Out of His Tree—; 5. "A Land that Cannot Fight" (「戦えない国」, "Tatakaenai Kuni") —Wise Men's Forecast—; 6. "Land of Imitations" (「贋物の国」, "Ganbutsu no Kuni") —Trade Make—; 7. "A Land that Came to Help" (「助けに来た国」, "Tasuke ni Kita Kuni") —Under the Rainbow—; 8. "Land of Slugging" (「撃ちまくれる国」, "Uchimakureru Kuni") —Busters—; Epilogue. "An Abandoned Land ･ a" (「捨てる国・a」, "Suteru Kuni ･ a") —Till You Drop ･ a— Special. "Tale of a Fifteen Year Old" (「十五歳の話」, "Juugosai no Hanashi") —FifTeen—
20	October 8, 2016	978-4-04-892396-5	—	—
Prologue. "Tales of Travels･ b" (「旅の話・b」, "Tabi no Hanashi ･ b") —Around the World ･ b— Frontispiece. "Land Without a Sea" (「海のない国」, "Umi no Nai Kuni") —Can You Sea Me?—: 1. "Land of Humans" (「人間の国」, "Ningen no Kuni") —the Ark—; 2. "Land of Ill Will" (「仲の悪い国」, "Naka no Warui Kuni") —I Need You.—; 3. "Land of Indifference" (「拘らない国」, "Kakawaranai Kuni") —Love Them All!—; 4. "A Treasure Hunting Story" (「宝探しの話」, "Takarasagashi no Hanashi") —Generic—; 5. "A Treasure Hunting Story" (「宝探しの話」, "Takarasagashi no Hanashi") —Genocide—; 6. "Story of a Couple" (「夫婦の話」, "Fuufu no Hanashi") —Taken—; 7. "Turning Point" (「ターニングポイント」, "Taaningu Pointo") —Turning Point—; 8. "A Field of Sheep" (「羊たちの草原」, "Hitsuji-tachi no Sougen") —Stray Army—; Epilogue. "Tales of Travels ･ a" (「旅の話・a」, "Tabi no Hanashi ･ a") —Around the World ･ a— Special. "Chapter 45: Rest and reminiscence are also important when traveling" (四十五話「旅には休憩や、振り返る時間も重要さ」, "Yojuugo Wa "Tabi ni wa Kyuukei ya, Furikaeru Jikan mo Juuyou sa") —Intermission 4—
21	October 7, 2017	978-4-04-893399-5	—	—
Prologue. "Visible Truth ･ b" (「見える真実・b」, "Mieru Shinjitsu ･ b") —She is Still There ･ b— Frontispiece. "A Gigantic Land" (「巨人の国」, "Kyodai no Kuni") —Skyscrapers—: 1. "A Land Used to Being Popular" (「有名になれる国」, "Yuumei ni Nareru Kuni") —On the Wave—; 2. "Land of Beautiful Men and Women" (「美男美女の国」, "Binan Bijin no Kuni") —Tastes Differ—; 3. "N Country" (「Nの国」, "N no Kuni") —N—; 4. "A Land That Does Not Allow Reading" (「読書が許されない国」, "Dokusho ga Yurusarenai Kuni") —Read or Lie—; 5. "A Land With a Crowded Train" (「満員電車が走っている国」, "Man'in Densha ga Hashitteiru Kuni") —No Pain, No Gain—; 6. "A Land That Disappeared" (「消えた国」, "Kieta Kuni") —What's Happened?—; 7. "A Perfect Land" (「完璧な国」, "Kanpeki na Kuni") —On Demand—; 8. "Land of Keys" (「鍵の国」, "Kagi no Kuni") —The Key of Tomorrow—; 9. "Land of Women" (「女の国」, "Onna no Kuni") —Equalizer—; 10. "A Land That Dies Every Day" (「 毎日死ぬ国」, "Mainichi Shinu Kuni") —Are You You?—; Epilogue. "Visible Truth ･ a" (「見える真実・a」, "Mieru Shinjitsu ･ a") —She is Still There ･ a—
22	July 10, 2019	978-4-04-912520-7	—	—
Frontispiece. "An Unknown Story" (「知らない話」, "Shiranai Hanashi") —Chasmatis— Frontispiece. "Birthday" (「誕生日」, "Tanjobi") —the Day—: 1. "Land of Masks" (「仮面の国」, "Kamen no Kuni") —Persona—; 2. "Land of Retreat" (「退いたの国」, "Shirizoita no Kuni") —Leader—; 3. "Exchanged Country" (「取り替える国」, "Torikaeru Kuni") —Changeling—; 4. "Land of Discussion" (「議論の国」, "Giron no Kuni") —Discussion-Maker—; 5. "Delivery Story" (「届ける話」, "Todokeru Hanashi") —Delivery—; 6. "Schedule for Next Year" (「来年の予定」"Rainen no Yotei") —Lucky Girls—; 7. "Land of Feeding" (「餌の国」, "Esa no Kuni") —the Cage—; Epilogue. "By the River・a" (「川の畔で・a」, "Kawa no Hotori de・a") —Lost by the River・a—
23	November 10, 2020	978-4-04-913318-9	—	—
Frontispiece. "Country Of Actors" (「演技の国」, "Engi no Kuni'") —Correctness— Frontispiece. "Ben's Country" (「ベンの国」, "Ben no Kuni") —Once Bitten— Prologue. "By the Red Fog Lake ･ b" (「赤い霧の湖で・b」, "Akai Kiri no Mizumi de ･ b") —Soared ･ b—: 1. "Country With Robots" (「ロボットがいる国」, "Robotto ga Iru Kuni") —Sustainable—; 2. "Pink Birds" (「ピンクの鳥」, "Pinku no Tori") —Pink Elephants—; 3. "Sleeping Country" (「眠る国」, "Nemuru Kuni") —Changeling—; 4. "A Land Where Fools Can Die" (「愚か者は死んでもいい国」, "Orokamono wa shindemoī-koku") —Foolproof—; 5. "A Land That Can Fight" (「戦える国」, "Tatakaeru Kuni") —Like You—; 6. "Land of Snipers" (「狙撃犯のいる国」"Sogeki-Han no Iru Kuni") —Trigger Control—; 7. "Land of Beginnings and Endings" (「始まりと終わりの国」, "Hajimari to Owari no Kuni") —Starting Over—; Epilogue. "By the Red Fog Lake・a" (「赤い霧の湖で・a」, "Akai Kiri no Mizumi de・a") —Soared・a—
24	September 10, 2025	978-4-04-916590-6	—	—
Frontispiece. "Country Where You Can Become Beautiful" (「綺麗になれる国」, "Kirei ni Nareru Kuni") —Disposer— Frontispiece. "Shooting Range Country" (「射撃場の国」, "Shagekijō no Kuni") —Streetlegal— Prologue. "Country Given Power・b" (「力を与えられた国・b」, "Chikara o Ataerareta Kuni・b") —the Cage 2・b—: 1. "Carried Story" (「運ばれる話」, "Hakobareru Hanashi") —Crossing—; 2. "Country With a Temperature Gap" (「温度差のある国」, "Ondosa no Aru Kuni") —Temperature—; 3. "Tested Story" (「試される話」, "Tamesareru Hanashi") —Proper Act—; 4. "Young Country" (「若い国」, "Wakai Kuni") —the Reason Why He Became the Oldest President.—; 5. "No-Joking Country" (「冗談が通じない国」, "Jōdan ga Tsūjinai Kuni") —No Joking Area—; 6. "Rifle Talks" (「ライフルの話し」, "Raifuru no Hanashi") —Rifle Talks—; 7. "Country That Rephrases" (「言い換える国」, "Iikaeru Kuni") —That's NOT What We Mean.—; 8. "××××× Journey" (「×××××の旅」, "××××× no Tabi") —25 Years—; Epilogue. "Country Given Power・a" (「力を与えられた国・a」, "Chikara o Ataerareta Kuni・a") —the Cage 2・a—

=== Gakuen Kino ===
No.	Release date	ISBN
1	July 10, 2006	978-4-8402-3482-5
Spinning off from a joke in the afterword to volume four of Kino's Journey, the story finds Kino attending a high school with her talking cell phone strap, Hermes. When students start turning into monsters, Kino transforms into a gun toting magical girl, but her efforts are thwarted by the incompetent would be rival hero claiming to be her partner, Shizu.
2	July 10, 2007	978-4-8402-3908-0
3	June 10, 2009	978-4-04-867840-7
4	July 10, 2010	978-4-04-868644-0
5	July 8, 2011	978-4-04-870690-2
6	October 10, 2019	978-4-04-912665-5
7	May 8, 2021	978-4-04-913789-7

== See also ==
- List of Kino's Journey episodes
