= Sword Art Online Alternative: Gun Gale Online =

Japanese light novel and its adaptations

- First light novel volume cover, featuring Llenn (left) and Karen Kohiruimaki (right)

ソードアート・オンライン オルタナティブ ガンゲイル・オンライン (Sōdo Āto Onrain Orutanatibu: Gan Geiru Onrain)
- Genre: Adventure; Comedy drama; Science fiction
- Light novel
- Written by: Keiichi Sigsawa
- Illustrated by: Kouhaku Kuroboshi
- Published by: ASCII Media Works
- English publisher: NA: Yen Press
- Imprint: Dengeki Bunko
- Original run: December 10, 2014 – present
- Volumes: 14
Further information
Manga
Written by	Keiichi Sigsawa
Illustrated by	Tadadi Tamori
Published by	ASCII Media Works
English publisher	NA: Yen Press
Magazine	Dengeki Maoh
Original run	December 27, 2015 – January 21, 2021
Volumes	4
Anime television series
Directed by	Masayuki Sakoi
Written by	Yōsuke Kuroda
Music by	Starving Trancer
Studio	3Hz (S1); A-1 Pictures (S2)
Licensed by	AUS: Madman Entertainment; BI: Anime Limited; NA: Aniplex of America; SEA: Muse Communication
Original network	Tokyo MX, BS11, GYT, GTV, MBS, TV Aichi, Nittele Plus (S1), AT-X (S2)
Original run	April 8, 2018 – December 21, 2024
Episodes	24
- icon

Sword Art Online Alternative: Gun Gale Online (Japanese: ソードアート・オンライン オルタナティブ ガンゲイル・オンライン, Hepburn: Sōdo Āto Onrain Orutanatibu: Gan Geiru Onrain) is a Japanese light novel series written by Keiichi Sigsawa and illustrated by Kouhaku Kuroboshi. The series is a spin-off of Reki Kawahara's Sword Art Online series. A manga adaptation by Tadadi Tamori launched in 2015, and an anime television series adaptation produced by studio 3Hz aired between April and June 2018. A second season produced by A-1 Pictures premiered in October 2024. Both the light novel and the manga adaptation are published in North America by Yen Press, while the anime is licensed by Aniplex of America.

== Plot ==
Due to the incident that occurred in VR MMORPG Sword Art Online—where 10,000 players were trapped in the game on launch day—the popularity of VR games has plummeted due to fear of similar incidents. The NerveGear, SAO's VR device, was recalled and destroyed, but with the launch of its successor, the AmuSphere, combined with release of the license-free development support package the "Seed", the popularity of VR games saw a sudden resurgence.

The story follows Karen Kohiruimaki, a university student with a complex about her abnormal height. She begins playing a VR game called Gun Gale Online after it gives her the short, cute avatar that she has always wanted.

== Media ==
=== Print ===
Dengeki Bunko announced on September 18, 2014, that Keiichi Sigsawa would be writing a light novel based on Reki Kawahara's Sword Art Online light novel series. The series is supervised by Kawahara and illustrated by Kouhaku Kuroboshi, and ASCII Media Works published the first novel under the Dengeki imprint on December 10, 2014. During their panel at Anime NYC on November 18, 2017, Yen Press announced that they had licensed the series.

Tadadi Tamori launched a manga adaptation in ASCII Media Works seinen manga magazine Dengeki Maoh on October 27, 2015. During their panel at Sakura-Con on April 15, 2017, Yen Press announced that they had licensed the series in North America.

=== Anime ===
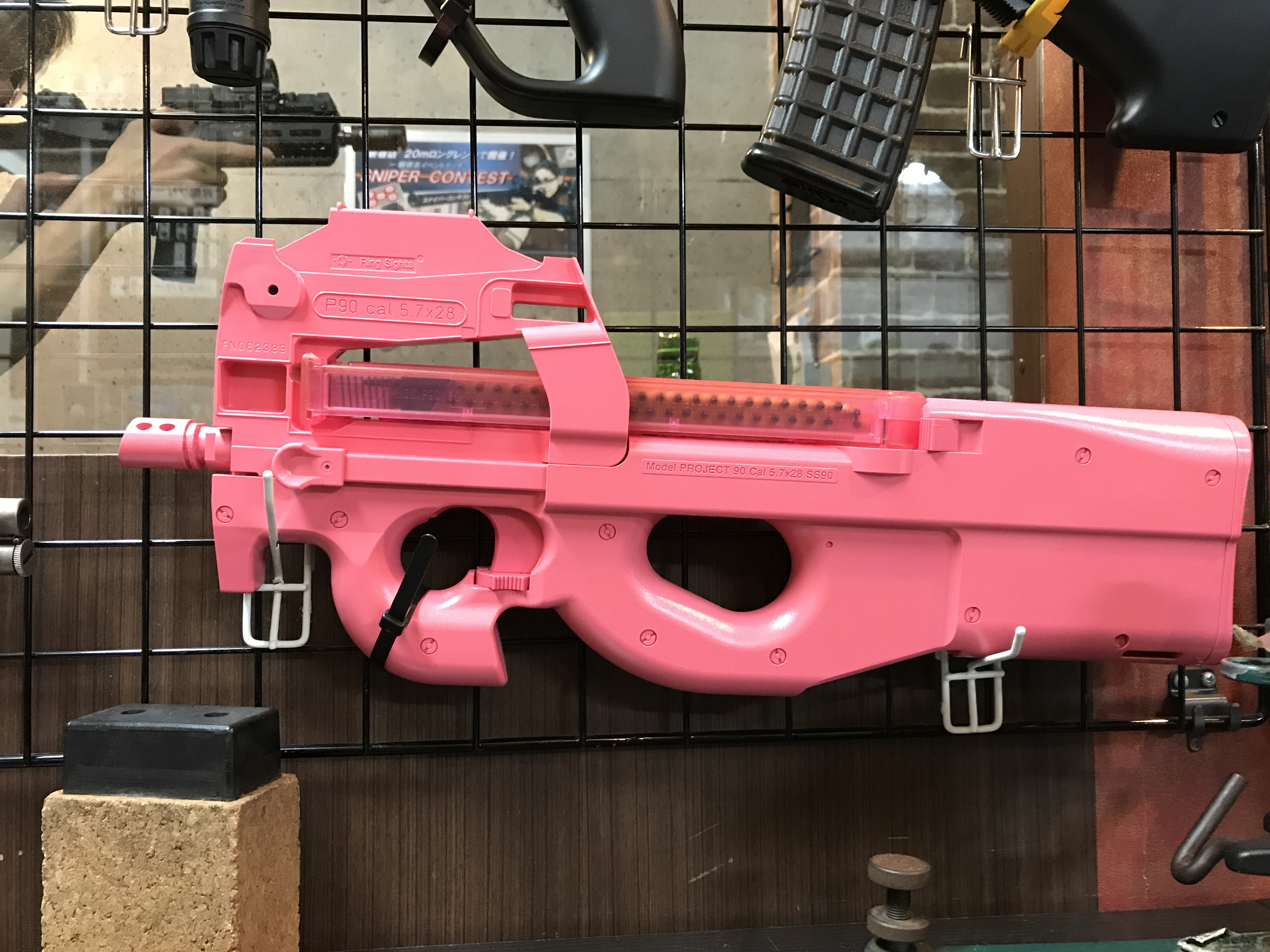
The Tokyo Marui P90 on display inside an air gun store in Japan

An anime television series adaptation was announced at the Dengeki Bunko Fall Festival 2017 event in October 2017. It is produced by Egg Firm and animated by studio 3Hz, and directed by Masayuki Sakoi, with scripts written by Yōsuke Kuroda, and character designs by Yoshio Kosakai. The opening theme song is "Ryūsei" (流星; lit. 'Meteor') performed by Eir Aoi, and the ending theme song is "To See the Future" performed by Tomori Kusunoki as her character LLENN.

The series aired from April 8 to June 30, 2018, on Tokyo MX and other networks. (Note: Tokyo MX listed the series premiere as April 7, 2018, at 24:00, which is effectively April 8 at midnight JST) The series was released on 6 home video sets with 2 episodes each, for a total of 12 episodes. Aniplex of America licensed and simulcasts the series on Crunchyroll and Hulu. Anime Limited announced that they had acquired the series for release in the United Kingdom and Ireland. Madman Entertainment licensed the series for release in Australia and New Zealand, simulcasting it on AnimeLab.

A second season was announced at the Dengeki Bunko 30th anniversary event in July 2023. The main cast and staff members returned from the first season, with A-1 Pictures as the studio, replacing 3 Hz. It aired from October 5 to December 21, 2024. (Note: Tokyo MX listed the second season premiere as October 4, 2024, at 24:00, which is effectively October 5 at midnight JST) Muse Asia reported that they have licensed the distribution of Gun Gale Online II in Asia. The English dub began streaming on Crunchyroll on November 1, 2024.

=== Airsoft collaboration ===
To promote the anime, Tokyo Marui made a limited edition FN P90 submachine gun with a pink finish as part of a collaboration with Keiichi Sigsawa and Kōji Akimoto, the latter who worked on the air gun's color. The pink P90 was raffled to the public through a raffle in a collaboration with Pizza Hut Japan, in which two of them were awarded to contestants.

A limited edition Vorpal Bunny pistol made by Tokyo Marui was announced initially for a release in 2019. It was eventually released in 2020. TM announced a rerelease on February 1, 2025.

An unofficial clone of the Vorpal Bunny (AM45 Pink) was also released by Double Bell.

=== Video game ===
Llenn, Pitohui, M, and Fukaziroh made their video game debut in Sword Art Online: Fatal Bullet as a free update. They later have a major role in the DLC episode "Dissonance of the Nexus", which is also the first time they interact with the main series characters.

== Reception ==
During the first half of 2015, the series was the eleventh best-selling light novel series, with its first and second volumes ranking at eighth and seventeenth place, respectively. The fourth volume also managed to be the 25th best-selling novel during the first half of 2016. By May 2018, the series had one million copies in print.
