= Cosmos no Sora ni =

2001 video game

- The cover art for Cosmos no Sora ni featuring heroines (clockwise from the top) Uiko, Haruhi, Suzuka, Wakana and Hiyori.

秋桜の空に
- Genre: Drama, Romance
- Video game
- Developer: Marron
- Publisher: Hobibox
- Genre: Eroge, Visual novel
- Platform: Windows
- Released: JP: July 27, 2001
- Light novel

Cosmos no Sora ni: Nanazaka no Mon
- Written by: Takei Tōka
- Illustrated by: Rei Izumi
- Published by: Softgarage
- Imprint: KSS Novels
- Published: June 14, 2002

Cosmos no Sora ni (Japanese: 秋桜の空に; lit. In the Cosmos Sky) is a Japanese adult visual novel developed by Marron that was released for Windows on July 27, 2001. The story is told from the perspective of Yasuomi Nīzawa, who discovers more about his childhood memories as the high school cultural festival approaches. The gameplay in Cosmos no Sora ni follows a branching plot line which offers pre-determined scenarios with courses of interaction, and focuses on the appeal of the female main characters by the player character.

Sales for the game were decent, if unremarkable—the game charted at number 12 in the sales ranking at the time of its release. The game is important to otaku culture and anime in general because Haruhi Sakuma is considered to be one of the first tsundere characters. Light novels, a comic anthology and audio dramas have been produced based on Cosmos no Sora ni.

== Gameplay ==
Example of what average conversation looks like in Cosmos no Sora ni. Here, Yasuomi is talking with Suzuka.

Cosmos no Sora ni is a romance visual novel in which the player assumes the role of Yasuomi Nīzawa (the player can choose the protagonist's name). Much of its gameplay is spent reading the text that appears on the screen, which represents the story's narrative and dialogue. The text is accompanied by character sprites, which represent who Yasuomi is talking to, over background art. Throughout the game, the player encounters CG artwork at certain points in the story, which take the place of the background art and character sprites. There is no voice acting in the game.

There are five main plot lines that the player will have the chance to experience, one for each of the heroines in the story. Throughout gameplay, the player is given multiple options to choose from, and text progression pauses at these points until a choice is made. Depending on which choice the player makes, the plot will progress in a specific direction. To view all plot lines in their entirety, the player will have to replay the game multiple times and choose different choices to further the plot to an alternate direction. There are scenes with sexual CGs depicting Yasuomi and a given heroine having sex.

== Plot ==
=== Story ===
Yasuomi Nīzawa was separated from his parents and moved into his grandfather's house after losing his memories as a child, as the amnesia distanced him from his parents. The main story of Cosmos no Sora ni takes place in the fall season when Yasuomi is a sophomore at Nanazaka High School (奈々坂学園, Nanazaka Gakuen). As everyone is preparing for the approaching cultural festival, Yasuomi begins to discover more about his past and memories. During this time, the protagonist bonds with a heroine of the player's choice through healing each other's pain. Each heroine has an emotional scar that plays a significant role in her story; for example, Suzuka's story deals with her guilt for being responsible for a childhood incident.

=== Main characters ===
Yasuomi Nīzawa (新沢 靖臣, Nīzawa Yasuomi)
Voiced by: Hikaru Midorikawa (drama CD)
Yasuomi is the protagonist of Cosmos no Sora ni who lost his memories in childhood. At a young age, he was separated from his parents and now he lives in his grandfather's house. He is a second-year student at Nanazaka High School who likes to prank other students.
Suzuka Sakurabashi (桜橋 涼香, Sakurabashi Suzuka)
Voiced by: Hōko Kuwashima (drama CD)
Suzuka is the main heroine and Yasuomi's childhood friend who acts like an older sister towards him. As she is his next-door neighbor, she will often cook meals for him.

Haruhi Sakuma (佐久間 晴姫, Sakuma Haruhi)
Voiced by: Haruna Ikezawa (drama CD)
Haruhi is a sophomore like Yasuomi but she belongs to a different class. She is the president of the women's swimming club at Nanazaka High School.

Wakana Kusunoki (楠 若菜, Kusunoki Wakana)
Voiced by: Yukari Tamura (drama CD)
Wakana is a classmate of Yasuomi who has been in and out of the hospital. She is unusually short and frail because of her hospitalization.

Uiko Amakozaki (尼子崎 初子, Amakozaki Uiko)
Voiced by: Tomoko Kawakami (drama CD)
Uiko is Yasuomi's classmate and a good friend of Wakana.

Hiyori Koizumi (小泉 ひより, Koizumi Hiyori)
Voiced by: Yūko Minaguchi (drama CD)
Hiyori is a third-year student at university who is twenty-one years old.

== Development and release ==
Cosmos no Sora ni is the first visual novel developed by Marron. The game is structured around the theme of a protagonist and heroine healing each other. Furthermore, Cosmos no Sora ni is self-described as a "healing AVG of laughter and tears" (笑いと涙の癒し系AVG, warai to namida no iyashikei AVG). The scenario was written solely by Takei Tōka, and most of the game's art was drawn by Kō Iwadate, who was also in charge of character design. Super deformed (SD) art was drawn by Kō Sumeragi. On July 27, 2001, Hobibox released Cosmos no Sora ni as one CD-ROM compatible to the Windows 95/98/ME operating systems.

== Related media ==
=== Printed media ===
A 305-page light novel adaptation titled Cosmos no Sora ni: Nanazaka no Mon (秋桜の空に 〜奈々坂の門〜; lit. In the Cosmos Sky ~The Gate of Nanazaka~) was released by Softgarage under their KSS Novels imprint on June 14, 2002 (ISBN 4-87709-577-2). The light novel features an original story written by Takei Tōka, the scenario writer for the game, and cover art by Kō Iwadate, the game's artist and character designer. The internal illustrations were drawn by manga artist Rei Izumi. An anthology comic drawn by 19 different artists was released by Softgarage under their Sofgare Comics imprint on May 22, 2003 (ISBN 4-921068-95-X). A self-published light novel titled Himawari no Chapel de Kimi to vs Cosmos no Sora ni (ひまわりのチャペルできみとvs秋桜の空に) was included with the limited edition release of Himawari no Chapel de Kimi to, the third and final visual novel developed by Marron, on August 24, 2007. It was written by Takei Tōka and illustrated by Watsukiya. The story is a crossover of Cosmos no Sora ni and Himawari no Chapel de Kimi to.

=== Music and audio dramas ===
All songs in Cosmos no Sora ni are sung by Yuiko. The game's opening theme is "Sayonara wo Sora ni" (さよならを空に; lit. Goodbye to the Sky) and ending theme is "Everlasting Flower". The insert song is "Yu" (癒; lit. Healing). An original soundtrack for the game was never released, but the songs were later included in the Marron Vocal Collection CD which was released by Hobirecords on July 31, 2008.

Hobirecords has released two sets of drama CDs, each comprising four CDs. The first set was released between January 17, 2003, and August 29, 2003. Jacket illustrations for the set were drawn by Kō Iwadate, the game's artist. The ending theme for CD volumes one, two and four is "Omoide wo Sora ni" (おもいでを空に; lit. Memories to the Sky) by Yukari Tamura (Wakana's voice actress), and "Everlasting Flower" is the ending theme for the third CD. The second set was released between March 12, 2004, and January 14, 2005. The fourth drama CD is only included as a bonus if the entire set is purchased. Kōhaku Kuroboshi provides the jacket illustrations for the set.

== Reception and legacy ==
In a national sales ranking of bishōjo games conducted by PCNews, Cosmos no Sora ni charted for the first time at number 12 at the time of its release. The game charted at 31 in the next ranking two weeks later. Cosmos no Sora ni placed fourth in the category "best adult game of the year 2002" on E-Login. Cosmos no Sora ni is considered to be a pioneer of the "older sister game" (姉ゲー, anegē) which started to gain popularity in 2003. Cosmos no Sora ni is also often speculated to be where the term "tsundere" originated from, as Haruhi Sakuma is one of the earliest examples of characters with tsundere traits.
