= Meg and Seron =

Japanese light novel series

- Meg and Seron light novel volume 1 cover.

メグとセロン (Megu to Seron)
- Genre: Adventure, Romance
- Light novel
- Written by: Keiichi Sigsawa
- Illustrated by: Kouhaku Kuroboshi
- Published by: MediaWorks
- Imprint: Dengeki Bunko
- Original run: March 10, 2008 – May 10, 2012
- Volumes: 7
- Other
- Allison (first novel series); Lillia and Treize (second novel series); Allison & Lillia (anime)

Meg and Seron (メグとセロン, Megu to Seron) is a Japanese light novel adventure series written by Keiichi Sigsawa, with illustrations by Kohaku Kuroboshi starring Meg, a supporting character from Lillia and Treize. The first novel was released on March 10, 2008, published by MediaWorks under their Dengeki Bunko label.

== Characters ==
Megmica "Meg" Straussky (メグ(シュトラウスキー・メグミカ), Megu (Shutorausuki Megumika))
Meg is a sixteen-year-old girl from Sou Beil, the western region of her world. Due to her father's work, Meg comes to live in the eastern region Roxche. She comes to be in the same class as Lillia even though Meg is one year older than she is. She is the chorus club's best singer, and eventually becomes a newspaper club member. She is gentle, sensitive, and trusting to a fault. She is completely unaware of Seron's feelings for her.
Seron Maxwell (セロン・マクスウェル)
Seron is a fifteen-year-old boy born and raised in Roxche, the son of Karen Maxwell, a highly successful business magnate. Seron is in the same year in school as Meg and Lillia, though is in a different class. He boards at the school dormitory because his residence is situated very far away from the capital. He is very bookish and diligent, and is skilled at everything except singing. He is also quite popular with girls (despite his default stoic look and quiet air) though he's turned down every single one. He is secretly in love with Meg, but doesn't know how to express it. Like Meg, he is in the school newspaper club, but only to be close to her.

== Light novels ==
Meg and Seron began as a series of light novels written by Keiichi Sigsawa, and illustrated by Kohaku Kuroboshi. The novels are published by MediaWorks under their Dengeki Bunko publishing label. Seven light novels have been published, the first on March 10, 2008, and the seventh and last on May 10, 2012. A spin off short story work called "Seron's Dream" (セロンの夢, Seron no Yume) was serialized in MediaWorks' light novel magazine Dengeki Bunko Magazine on February 10, 2008.
