= Kouhaku Kuroboshi =

Japanese illustrator and character designer

Kouhaku Kuroboshi 黒星 紅白
- Born: 1974 (age 51–52); Japan
- Other names: Takeshi Iizuka (飯塚 武史, Iizuka Takeshi)
- Occupations: Illustrator, character designer
- Notable work: Kino's Journey, Sword Art Online Alternative Gun Gale Online, Tale of a Single Continent

Kouhaku Kuroboshi (黒星 紅白, Kuroboshi Kōhaku; born 1974), also known as Takeshi Iizuka (飯塚 武史, Iizuka Takeshi), is a Japanese illustrator and character designer. He is from the Kanagawa Prefecture and lives in the Fukuoka Prefecture. He is best known for his frequent collaborations with writer Keiichi Sigsawa as the illustrator/character designer for the Kino's Journey, Sword Art Online Alternative Gun Gale Online and Tale of a Single Continent series as well as with several other authors and game developers.

== Works ==
=== Illustration ===
- Tale of a Single Continent series
  - Allison
  - Lillia and Treize
  - Meg and Seron
- Aquarian Age Novel
- Cosmos no Sora ni Drama CD
- Danshi Kōkōsei de Urekko Light Novel Sakka o Shiteiru Keredo, Toshishita no Classmate de Seiyū no Onnanoko ni Kubi o Shimerareteiru.
- Heisa no System
- Hokago Taima Roku
- Kino's Journey
  - Gakuen Kino
- Ocha ga Hakobarete Kuru Made ni 〜A Book At Cafe〜 (January 2010, ISBN 4-04-868286-5)
  - Yoru ga Hakobarete Kuru Made ni 〜A Book in A Bed〜 (December 2010, ISBN 4-04-870235-1)
  - Album cover and booklet for Yoru ga Hakobarete Kuru Made ni 〜A Song in A Bed〜 by angela (January 2011)
- Sword Art Online Alternative Gun Gale Online

=== Character design ===
- Fate/Grand Order (Original Character Design for Katsushika Hokusai, Abigail Williams, Yang Guifei and Jacques de Molay)
- 22/7 (Original Character Design for Mikami Kamiki)
- One Off
- Princess Principal
- Sacred Blaze
- Shigofumi: Letters from the Departed
- Sky Girls
- Summon Night series
- World Conquest Zvezda Plot
- Hololive English (Original Character Design for Ninomae Ina'nis)
- Azur Lane (Original Character Design for Shimakaze)

=== Artbooks ===
- Kuroboshi Kouhaku, The Beautiful World (March 2003, ISBN 4-8402-2296-7)
- Coadventure (December 2005, ISBN 4-08-873759-8)
- Kuroboshi Kouhaku Gashu noir (April 2015, ISBN 978-4-04869146-8)
- Kuroboshi Kouhaku Gashu blanc (January 2021, ISBN 978-4-04913331-8)

== See also ==
- Keiichi Sigsawa
