= Lillia and Treize =

Japanese light novel series

- Cover art of the first novel in the Lillia and Treize series

リリアとトレイズ (Riria to Toreizu)
- Genre: Adventure
- Light novel
- Written by: Keiichi Sigsawa
- Illustrated by: Kohaku Kuroboshi
- Published by: MediaWorks
- Imprint: Dengeki Bunko
- Original run: March 10, 2005 – April 10, 2007
- Volumes: 6
- Manga
- Written by: Keiichi Sigsawa
- Illustrated by: Hiroki Haruse
- Published by: ASCII Media Works
- Magazine: Comic Sylph
- Original run: December 9, 2006 – November 22, 2008
- Volumes: 2
- Other
- Allison (original novels); Meg and Seron (third novel series); Allison & Lillia (anime)

Lillia and Treize (リリアとトレイズ, Riria to Toreizu) is a Japanese light novel adventure series written by Keiichi Sigsawa, with illustrations by Kohaku Kuroboshi, starring the children of the characters from Allison. There are six light novels in the series, published by MediaWorks under their Dengeki Bunko label. The first novel was released on March 10, 2005, and the last novel was published on April 10, 2007; there are three stories in the six volumes, with each story taking up two volumes. The series was followed by Meg and Seron. A manga adaptation by Hiroki Haruse was serialized in the shōjo manga magazine Comic Sylph, also published by MediaWorks, between December 9, 2006, and November 22, 2008, and compiled in two volumes. An anime adaptation aired between April and October 2008 based on both the Allison and Lillia and Treize novels, known as Allison & Lillia.

== Characters ==
Lillia (リリア, Riria)
The female protagonist of the series. Lillia is the 15-year-old (16 in the third arc) daughter of Allison and Wil. She is feisty and outspoken with a childish streak. She prefers to be called Lillia because her full name (Lilliane Acacia Corazon Whittington Schultz) is too long. She is bilingual and able to fly a plane and has known Treize since childhood.
Treize (トレイズ, Toreizu)
The 16 (17 in the third arc) year-old son of Carr Benedict, formerly of Sous-Beil, and Fiona, also known as Queen Franchesca of Ixtova. Has a twin sister named Merielle whom he argues frequently with (especially regarding firstborn claims) and rarely wins against. He takes after his mother in looks. He is thoughtful and calm by nature and is quite skilled at many things (like cooking, hunting, flying planes and languages), but he is also somewhat dorky. Because of the Ixtovan royal family's "single child" rule, his rank as prince is not publicly known. His royal family crest is the hawk. He and Lillia have known each other since childhood. Through the years, he appears to develop feelings for her, but he is unable to act (effectively) on them. Of all the major characters in this part of the series, only Lillia is unaware of his real identity.

== Media ==
=== Light novels ===
Lillia and Treize began as a series of light novels written by Keiichi Sigsawa and drawn by Kouhaku Kuroboshi. The novels are published by MediaWorks under their Dengeki Bunko publishing label. There are six novels which encompass three stories split between two volumes each. The first novel was released on March 10, 2005, and the final novel was published on April 10, 2007. The series was followed by Meg and Seron. The light novels have sold over 1.1 million copies.

=== Manga ===
A manga adaptation started serialization in the Japanese shōjo manga magazine Comic Sylph on December 9, 2006, published by MediaWorks and ended on November 22, 2008. The manga takes its story from the light novels that preceded it, and is illustrated by Hiroki Haruse. The first bound volume was published by ASCII Media Works on April 26, 2008, under their Dengeki Comics label. Two volumes in total were published.
