= Allison (novel series) =

Japanese light novel series

- Allison light novel volume 1

アリソン (Arison)
- Genre: Adventure
- Light novel
- Written by: Keiichi Sigsawa
- Illustrated by: Kouhaku Kuroboshi
- Published by: MediaWorks
- Imprint: Dengeki Bunko
- Original run: March 10, 2002 – May 10, 2004
- Volumes: 4
- Video game
- Developer: MediaWorks
- Publisher: MediaWorks
- Genre: Sound novel
- Platform: Nintendo DS
- Released: December 7, 2006
- Manga
- Written by: Keiichi Sigsawa
- Illustrated by: Hiroki Haruse
- Published by: ASCII Media Works
- Magazine: Dengeki Comic Gao! (former); Dengeki Daioh
- Original run: July 27, 2007 – December 27, 2008
- Volumes: 2
- Other
- Lillia and Treize (second novel series); Meg and Seron (third novel series); Allison & Lillia (anime)

Allison (アリソン, Arison) is a Japanese light novel series written by Keiichi Sigsawa, with illustrations by Kouhaku Kuroboshi. There are three Allison novels, with the third split into two volumes, published by MediaWorks under their Dengeki Bunko label. The first novel was released on March 10, 2002, and the last novel was published on May 10, 2004. There is a follow-up series of light novels called Lillia and Treize which were released between March 2005 and April 2007. There is also an Allison sound novel for the Nintendo DS which was released on December 7, 2006. A manga adaptation by Hiroki Haruse started serialization in the shōnen manga magazine Dengeki Comic Gao! on July 27, 2007, also published by MediaWorks. The manga ended serialization in Dengeki Comic Gao! on January 27, 2008, but continued serialization in MediaWorks' seinen manga magazine Dengeki Daioh from March 21 to December 27, 2008. It was compiled in two volumes. An anime adaptation based on both the Allison and Lillia and Treize novels, known as Allison & Lillia, aired between April and October 2008.

== Plot ==
Allison is an adventure series set in a world containing one continent (extending roughly from the Equator to 60 degrees North latitude) which is divided down the center by a towering mountain range and a huge river. The industry and technology of the world are roughly equivalent to Europe in the 1930s. Due to the geography, two cultures developed on either side of the divide, and at the time the story begins, the cultures have been at war on and off for hundreds of years. The east side of the world is known as Roxche (ロクシェ, Rokushe), though formally the region's name is the Roxcheanuk Confederation. The entire region comprises sixteen countries which all speak a common language. The west side is known as Sou Beil (スー･ベー･イル, Sū Bē Iru), though formally the region's name is the Allied Kingdoms of Bezel Iltoa. The region comprises the two kingdoms of Bezel and Iltoa which both serve to bring together a small number of countries under a common language different than that of the eastern region. There are far more blond-haired people in the West than in the East.

At the beginning of the first novel, Allison, a pilot in the Roxche Air Force, has come to visit her childhood friend Wilhelm ("Wil" for short), who has remained at school over his summer break to continue his studies. While traveling in the countryside near the school, the two encounter an old man well known to Wil's schoolmates as a teller of tall tales. Nevertheless, he captures their interest with his talk about a "treasure" which, if found, is said to be able to put an end to the war.

== Main characters ==
Allison Whittington
The series' main protagonist and namesake, Allison is a corporal in the Roxche Air Force. Sent to Future House when her father Oscar Whittington went into battle, the strong-willed, adventurous girl became unlikely friends with the quiet, bookish Wil, making him her "lackey" and getting the two of them into situations with a regularity that would earn them a reputation among the other children. Like Wil, Allison speaks Bezelese fluently, but already knew it when the two met, having learned it from her father. Though she and Wil now spend most of their time apart, they exchange letters frequently and Allison works to arrange meetings between them in often-convoluted ways.
Wilhelm "Wil" Schultz
The male protagonist of the series, Wil is a fifth-year student at the prestigious Rowe Sneum Upper School, where he is one of the top students. Abandoned by his parents at a young age, he grew up under the watchful eye of "granny" Corason Moot at Future House, where he learned Bezelese and gained an interest in the West. Upon Allison's arrival ten years ago, he became her semi-willing "lackey" almost immediately. Now seventeen, he splits his school holidays between on-campus study and his friend's family's palatial estate. Though he is exceptionally bright, Wil's financial situation is tenuous at best and his scholarship dictates that he cannot skip grades or graduate early. When Allison insists on one of their adventures, he relies on her, or his friend's, financial backing.
Carr Benedict

(Note: as a resident of Sou Beil, "Carr" is his surname and "Benedict" is his personal name.)

The third member of the core cast to appear, Benedict starts out in the series as a 24-year-old sublieutenant in the Sou Beil Air Force. Though an accomplished pilot, he is relegated to a mid-ranking soldier at a base of little note on the edge of the uninhabited Buffer Zone. With few duties of substance, he spends his time flirting with (and trying to pick up) the women of the base, which earns him the ire of his fellow male soldiers. He would even be relatively successful at it, if not for his potential dates discovering that he's asked out everyone else as well. In spite of this, he appears not to be a womanizer so much as genuinely interested in the women in his life, and unable to keep himself from acting on this impulse (albeit to a foolish degree). As a soldier, he is fiercely loyal to his comrades, but harbors a sense of justice that supersedes his official duties, leading him to disobey orders in favor of doing what he feels is right.

== Media ==
=== Light novels ===
Allison began as a series of light novels written by Keiichi Sigsawa and drawn by Kouhaku Kuroboshi. The novels are published by MediaWorks under their Dengeki Bunko publishing label. There are three Allison novels, with the third split into two volumes. The first novel was released on March 10, 2002, and the final novel was published on May 10, 2004. The light novels have sold over one million copies. These novels were developed into the first thirteen episodes of the television adaptation Allison & Lillia.

#	Title	ISBN	Release date
1	Allison (アリソン, Arison)	4840220603	March 2002
Allison drops in on her childhood friend Wilhelm during his summer break from school. When the two meet an old man who boasts of a treasure that will end the war between East and West, they are initially skeptical, but he is soon kidnapped and the two are targeted as witnesses. Allison and Wil steal an airplane and cross the border into Sou Beil, to rescue the old man and recover the treasure.
2	Allison II: A Dream of Night in Midday (アリソン II 真昼の夜の夢, Arison II Mahiru no Yoru no Yume)	4840223076	March 2003
When Wil writes to Allison that his school will be having an excursion in the mountain country of Iks, she urges him into going despite his limited financial resources. Once there, he is "abducted" by Allison, who takes him to meet a now world-famous Benedict. When Allison's plan to be alone with Wil is thwarted by a sudden snowstorm, the two take shelter in a remote village, and a worried Benedict sets out after them. The mystery the three of them uncover, embodied by a girl named Fiona, could shake the foundations of the "Kingdom without a King".
3	Allison III (Part 1): Lutoni through the Railcar Window (アリソン III (上) ルトニを車窓から, Arison III (Jou) Rutoni o Shasō kara)	4840226296	March 2004
4	Allison III (Part 2): A Train Named Conspiracy (アリソン III (下) 陰謀という名の列車, Arison III (Ge) Inbō to iu Na no Ressha)	4840226814	May 2004
Fifteen-year-old Lilliane Schultz lives with her mother, a test pilot for the Roxche Air Force, in a small apartment in the Roxchean capital. Reflecting on her family, she tells of how her father perished in a train accident before she was born. Years earlier, Allison, Wil, and Fiona are each shocked to find themselves the recipients of a ticket for the Transcontinental Limited Express, courtesy of Benedict. The luxury train, on only its fourth trip, is set to take them on a multi-day journey from Roxche to Sou Beil, across the only recently completed bridge over the Lutoni River. However, the quartet's peaceful ride in the lap of luxury is brought to an abrupt end when the train's conductors and passenger attendants are murdered, with the killer still among them. Diverting to a nearby Sou Beil army base, the train leaves most of its guests (save for the targeted steel magnate Mr. Terror) in the hands of the soldiers there. However, the four friends choose instead to cast their lot with the enigmatic Major Stork, whose mission grows ever murkier as the train presses westward. Indeed, the Sou Beil officer has objectives of his own, and his words indicate he may hold the answer to the mystery surrounding Allison's father's death. Back in the present, Lillia welcomes both her mother's boyfriend, a Major in the Sou Beil Army, and her childhood friend Treize into her home. But unbeknownst to her, the two men harbor their own secrets...

=== Visual novel ===
A sound novel, with card game attributes, based on the series was released on December 7, 2006, in limited and regular editions by MediaWorks playable on the Nintendo DS. Allison is one of the few light novels originally published by MediaWorks that has been made into a sound novel under DS Dengeki Bunko, a section of MediaWorks which produces sound novels playable on the Nintendo DS based on light novels published under MediaWorks' Dengeki Bunko publishing label. Allison was the first game produced under DS Dengeki Bunko, and the only others include Baccano!, Inukami!, and Iriya no Sora, UFO no Natsu.

=== Manga ===
A manga adaptation started serialization in the Japanese shōnen manga magazine Dengeki Comic Gao! on July 27, 2007, published by MediaWorks. and ended on December 27, 2008. The manga takes its story from the light novels that preceded it, and is illustrated by Hiroki Haruse. The manga ended serialization in Dengeki Comic Gao! on January 27, 2008, but continued serialization in MediaWorks' shōnen manga magazine Dengeki Daioh on March 21, 2008. The first bound volume was published by ASCII Media Works on April 26, 2008, under their Dengeki Comics label. Two volumes in total were published.
