= Keiichi Sigsawa =

Japanese light novel author (born 1972)

Keiichi Sigsawa 時雨沢 恵一
- Born: 1972 (age 53–54); Kanagawa Prefecture, Japan
- Occupation: Writer
- Writing career
- Language: Japanese
- Notable works: Kino's Journey, Allison, Lillia and Treize, Sword Art Online Alternative Gun Gale Online

Keiichi Sigsawa (時雨沢 恵一, Shigusawa Keiichi; born 1972) is a Japanese light novel author. In 2000, his work Kino's Journey was a finalist for the 6th Dengeki Novel Prize, and was subsequently serialized in Dengeki hp magazine in March of the same year, marking his debut. Kino's Journey proved popular, and has continued in serialization (as well as collected bunko releases) since that time.

Sigsawa's name, a pen name, was derived from SIG Sauer, a firearms manufacturer, and "a manga hero", definitely Keiichi Morisato from Oh My Goddess!, according to the afterword in the second volume of Gakuen Kino. He loves to travel, ride his motorcycle, and is a self-professed "gun maniac". He mentions Galaxy Express 999 and the works of Hayao Miyazaki as some of his primary influences.

== Works ==
- Kino's Journey
  - Gakuen Kino
- Tale of a Single Continent series
  - Allison
  - Lillia and Treize
  - Meg and Seron
- Bludgeoning Angel Dokuro-Chan desu
- Ocha ga Hakobaretekuru Made ni: A Book At Cafe (January 2010, ISBN 4-04-868286-5)
- Yoru ga Hakobaretekuru Made ni: A Book in A Bed (December 2010, ISBN 4-04-870235-1)
- Kotae ga Hakobaretekuru Made ni: A Book without Answers (December 2011, ISBN 4-04-886267-7)
- Danshi Kōkōsei de Urekko Light Novel Sakka o Shiteiru Keredo, Toshishita no Classmate de Seiyū no Onnanoko ni Kubi o Shimerareteiru (January 2014, ISBN 978-4-04-866273-4)
- Sword Art Online Alternative Gun Gale Online

== See also ==
- Kouhaku Kuroboshi
- ASCII Media Works
