= Kino's Journey =

Japanese light novel series

- First light novel volume cover featuring Kino

キノの旅 —the Beautiful World— (Kino no Tabi —the Beautiful World—)
- Genre: Adventure; Philosophical; Science fiction
- Light novel
- Written by: Keiichi Sigsawa
- Illustrated by: Kouhaku Kuroboshi
- Published by: ASCII Media Works
- English publisher: NA: Tokyopop (former) Yen Press (current)
- Imprint: Dengeki Bunko
- Magazine: Dengeki hp; Dengeki Bunko Magazine
- Original run: March 17, 2000 – present
- Volumes: 24
Further information
Anime television series
Kino's Journey —the Beautiful World—
Directed by	Ryūtarō Nakamura
Written by	Sadayuki Murai
Music by	Ryo Sakai
Studio	A.C.G.T
Licensed by	AUS: Hanabee; NA: ADV Films (expired); Sentai Filmworks; UK: Anime Limited
Original network	WOWOW
English network	SA: Animax India; SEA: Animax Asia; US: Imaginasian, Anime Network
Original run	April 8, 2003 – July 8, 2003
Episodes	13 + 1 OVA
Video game
Developer	Tycoon
Publisher	ASCII Media Works
Genre	Visual novel
Platform	PlayStation 2
Released	July 17, 2003
Anime film
Kino's Journey: Life Goes On
Directed by	Takashi Watanabe (Note: The director Takashi Watanabe (渡部高志) and the producer Takashi Watanabe (渡辺隆) are different people.)
Produced by	Takashi Watanabe; Naoko Koyama; Tadakazu Hiraga
Written by	Sadayuki Murai
Music by	Ryou Sakai
Studio	A.C.G.T
Released	February 19, 2005
Runtime	30 minutes
Video game
Kino's Journey II —the Beautiful World—
Developer	Tycoon
Publisher	ASCII Media Works
Genre	Visual novel
Platform	PlayStation 2
Released	December 1, 2005
Light novel
Gakuen Kino
Written by	Keiichi Sigsawa
Illustrated by	Kouhaku Kuroboshi
Published by	ASCII Media Works
Imprint	Dengeki Bunko
Magazine	Dengeki p; Dengeki h; Dengeki hpa
Original run	July 10, 2006 – present
Volumes	7
Anime film
Kino's Journey: Country of Illness —For You—
Directed by	Ryūtarō Nakamura
Produced by	Nobuhiro Oosawa; Naoko Koyama
Written by	Chiaki J. Konaka
Music by	Ryou Sakai
Studio	Shaft
Released	April 21, 2007
Runtime	30 minutes
Manga
Gakuen Kino
Illustrated by	Dennō Ōwadan
Published by	ASCII Media Works
Magazine	Dengeki G's Festival! Comic; Dengeki G's Magazine
Original run	February 23, 2010 – April 28, 2012
Volumes	3
Manga
Kino's Journey: The Beautiful World
Illustrated by	Iruka Shiomiya
Published by	Kodansha
English publisher	NA: Vertical
Imprint	Shōnen
Magazine	Shōnen Magazine Edge
Original run	March 17, 2017 – August 17, 2020
Volumes	8
Manga
Illustrated by	Gou
Published by	ASCII Media Works
Magazine	Dengeki Daioh
Original run	May 27, 2017 – December 27, 2019
Volumes	5
Anime television series
Kino's Journey —the Beautiful World— the Animated Series
Directed by	Tomohisa Taguchi
Produced by	Harutaka Ashitate; Takurou Hatekayama; Kentarou Hattori; Aya Iizuka; Kozue Kaneniwa; Yuusuke Yoshioka
Written by	Yukie Sugawara
Music by	Yoshiaki Dewa
Studio	Lerche
Licensed by	Crunchyroll
Original network	AT-X, Tokyo MX, KBS, Sun TV, BS11
English network	SEA: Animax Asia
Original run	October 6, 2017 – December 22, 2017
Episodes	12

Kino's Journey —the Beautiful World— (Japanese: キノの旅 —the Beautiful World—, Hepburn: Kino no Tabi —the Beautiful World—), shortened to Kino's Journey, is a Japanese light novel series written by Keiichi Sigsawa, with illustrations by Kouhaku Kuroboshi. The series follows a traveler named Kino and her talking motorcycle named Hermes, as they explore countries with unique customs and people around a mysterious world, only spending three days at each location. The series originally started serialization in volume five of MediaWorks' now-defunct light novel magazine Dengeki hp on March 17, 2000. The first volume of the series was published on July 10, 2000, by ASCII Media Works under their Dengeki Bunko publishing imprint. As of September 2025, 24 volumes have been published.

A 13-episode anime adaptation produced by A.C.G.T and Genco aired between April and July 2003 on WOWOW in Japan. Two visual novels for the PlayStation 2 were released by ASCII Media Works, the first in July 2003, and the second in December 2005. There have also been two 30-minute animated films produced, the first in February 2005, and the second in April 2007. A Kino's Journey light novel was only released as a promotional gift for the second animated movie. Additional merchandise includes three art books, three picture books, and a drama CD. Two manga adaptations were produced, and a new anime series aired 12 episodes from October to December 2017. A spin-off light novel series titled Gakuen Kino (学園キノ; lit. Academy Kino) began with the first volume published on July 10, 2006, by ASCII Media Works; seven volumes have been released as of May 2021.

== Plot ==
In Kino's Journey, the protagonist, Kino, accompanied by a talking motorcycle named Hermes, travels through a mystical world of many different countries and forests, each unique in its customs and people. She only spends three days and two nights in every town, without exception, on the principle that three days is enough time to learn almost everything important about a place, while leaving time to explore new lands. Kino says in The Land of Visible Pain that this principle is probably a lie, specifically noting "if I stay any longer, I'm afraid I will settle down." The recurring theme of the anime and novels is described by the phrase, "The world is not beautiful, therefore it is." Kino's Journey explores what the anime director Ryūtarō Nakamura described as "a radical sense of 'beauty'" and brutality, loneliness, nonsense, oppression and tragedy are often juxtaposed against compassion and a fairy-tale atmosphere.

For protection and hunting, Kino carries a .44 single-action revolver (called "the Cannon", based on a Colt Walker) that uses liquid explosives in place of gunpowder and a .22 automatic pistol (named "the Woodsman", based on a Colt Woodsman). Later in Kino's adventures in the novels, Kino also uses a pump-action shotgun (based on a Winchester M1897) and a semi-automatic sniper rifle (called "the Flute", based on an M14 rifle), along with a variety of other tools, including knives. In the anime, Kino is shown to carry no fewer than five knives, including one which can fire .22 bullets from its hilt. Kino is an unusually quick draw and practices every day before dawn.

Technology in this world exists, sometimes to the level of science fiction, although anachronisms are common (for example, the same land that has talking robots also appears to have phonographs, yet simultaneously the world has only begun to develop heavier-than-air flight). The level of technology also varies from country to country. The world is not heavily magical (the only "magical" elements include land that moves, talking vehicles, and a talking dog), although it has a certain fairy-tale quality.

== Characters ==
Kino sitting in front of Hermes, her talking motorcycle

Kino (キノ)
Voiced by: Ai Maeda (2003 anime, video games), Aoi Yūki (2017 anime), Aya Hisakawa (drama CD, Dengeki Bunko: Fighting Climax) (Japanese); Kelli Cousins (2003 anime), Gabi Chennisi (2003 anime) (Young), Lindsay Seidel (2017 anime) (English)
Kino is the main protagonist in the series and travels to different countries with her talking motorcycle Hermes, discovering their cultures and people. In the anime, Kino's sex is ambiguous in the beginning, but is confirmed to be female in the fourth episode, when she first meets Hermes and adopts the name "Kino" from another traveler. Throughout the series, Kino typically avoids discussing her gender and does not treat it as central to her identity, responding to questions about it with indifference or deflection. Kino is skilled in combat, carrying both guns and knives, and is accustomed to life as a traveler. To those she meets, she is invariably polite and answers questions directly.
Hermes (エルメス, Erumesu)
Voiced by: Ryuji Aigase (2003 anime, video games), Sōma Saitō (2017 anime), Junko Noda (drama CD) (Japanese); Cynthia Martinez (2003 anime), Derick Snow (2017 anime) (English)
Hermes is a talking Brough Superior motorcycle and is Kino's loyal companion; although it can be reluctant sometimes, it faithfully accompanies Kino in her travels. The relationship between Kino and Hermes is presented as symbiotic—as explained in the Land of Adults where Hermes provides speed, and Kino provides balance. In the first couple of episodes of the anime and almost all of the chapters in the novels, it has a tendency to mispronounce words and phrases. Its name is a reference to the Greek god Hermes. Although its name is spelled "Hermes", in the third book it is emphasized that the "H" in its name is silent.

Kino (male traveler) (キノ (旅人), Kino (tabibito))

Voiced by: Kazuhiko Inoue (2003 anime), Daisuke Ono (2017 anime) (Japanese); Chris Patton (English)
Not much is known about the original Kino, only that he is a young man with glasses and a calm demeanor who traveled by the same three-day rule that the main character Kino does. He arrived to the Land of Adults and was most likely the reason why the main character goes on her journey after he dies protecting her from the customs of her country. She often makes statements similar to the original Kino's and even quotes him on occasion. In the novels, the original Kino explains that he makes a living selling medicinal herbs and unusual items he finds while traveling.
Shizu (シズ)
Voiced by: Takashi Irie (2003 anime), Yūichirō Umehara (2017 anime) (Japanese); Clint Bickham (2003 anime), Jeff Johnson (2017 anime) (English)
Shizu is a young man with a great talent for swordsmanship. He travels in a dune buggy with Riku, his talking dog companion. He appears in multiple stories just about him, Riku and Ti in the novels. Riku narrates all but one of these stories. Later in the novels, Kino and Hermes meet up with Shizu and Riku again, but Kino seems to remember only Riku's name.
Riku (陸)
Voiced by: Hōchū Ōtsuka (2003 anime), Kenichirou Matsuda (2017 anime) (Japanese); Tejas Englesmith (2003 anime), Christopher Sabat (2017 anime) (English)
Riku is a talking dog of the Samoyed breed who travels with Shizu. He is large, white, and his face seems to be always smiling. Apparently, in the anime, Riku has only spoken to Hermes, as Kino does not believe Riku can speak when told about the discussion Hermes had with him. In the original anime version, Riku also speaks to Shizu, but in the English version, only barks or whimpers to him in these instances. In the novels, Riku speaks to both Kino and Hermes. In the 2017 anime, he speaks to both Kino and Hermes, much to the surprise of the latter.
Ti (ティー, Tī) / Tifana (ティファナ)
Voiced by: Mamiko Noto (video games), Ayane Sakura (2017 anime) (Japanese); Monica Rial (2017 anime) (English)
Ti, also known as Tifana, is a 12-year-old child Shizu befriends in the Ship Country. When Shizu decides to leave, she refuses to separate from him and decides to kill herself along with him. After being stopped by Kino, Ti is taken in by Shizu, traveling with him and Riku since then. Ti's weapon of choice is grenades, and she carries a bag containing a number of them for self-defense.
Sakura (さくら)
Voiced by: Aoi Yabusaki (now Aoi Yūki) (2003 anime), Kokoa Amano (2017 anime), Akemi Satō (drama CD) (Japanese); Hilary Haag (2003 anime), Ariel Graham (2017 anime) (English)
Sakura is a girl from the country Kino visited in the last episode of the first anime series. She shares many similarities to Kino, such as her parents also owning an inn. In the English version of the first anime series, her name is changed to Lily in order to preserve the explanation that her name, pronounced slightly differently, becomes an insult. The children call her "Silly Willy" instead of "nekura" (根暗; meaning "gloomy") and "okra" (オクラ, okura) in this version.
Shishou (師匠, Shishō)
Voiced by: Junko Midori, Akeno Watanabe (second video game), Lynn (2017 anime) (Japanese); Jennie Welch (2003 anime), Caitlin Glass (2017 anime) (English)
Shishou is Kino's master who taught her marksmanship. She lives in the forest and does not travel. Her actual name is unknown; "Shishou" is a title meaning "mentor" or "master" (although Kino does not realize this at first). In the final episode of the first anime series, which chronologically takes place before most other episodes, the gunsmith who repaired Kino's Cannon recognized it and told Kino that he once knew a young woman who insisted everyone call her "Shishou". She traveled between countries and stirred up trouble wherever she went. In the novels, multiple stories are devoted to her travels alongside a man referred to as her "student", when she was in her late twenties. She and her student are shown as being incredibly greedy, even to the point of being cruel. They travel in a battered yellow car resembling a Subaru 360.

== Media ==
=== Light novels ===
Tokyopop's English release of the first light novel volume featured a radically redesigned cover.

Kino's Journey began as a series of light novels written by Keiichi Sigsawa, and illustrated by Kouhaku Kuroboshi. The series originally started serialization in MediaWorks' now-defunct light novel magazine Dengeki hp with the release of volume six on March 17, 2000. The first volume of the series was published on July 10, 2000, by ASCII Media Works under their Dengeki Bunko publishing imprint. As of November 2020, 23 volumes have been published. The eighth volume of Kino's Journey, originally published in October 2004, was Dengeki Bunko's 1000th published novel. An additional volume entitled Kino's Journey —the Beautiful World— Country of Theater —Kino— (キノの旅 —the Beautiful World— 劇場の国 —KINO—, Kino no Tabi —the Beautiful World— Gekijō no Kuni —KINO—) was only released as a promotional gift for the second animated movie. A collection of special chapters entitled Kino's Journey: the Sigsawa's World (キノの旅 -the Sigsawa's World-, Kino no Tabi: the Sigsawa's World) came with the first volume of ASCII Media Works' light novel magazine Dengeki Bunko Magazine on April 10, 2008.

In commemoration of Dengeki Bunko's 20th anniversary, Kino's Journey was serialized weekly from April to September 2013 in several Japanese regional newspapers. The ten stories serialized during this period were included in the 17th volume published in October of the same year. The previous 16 volumes were released with new cover artwork also in commemoration of the anniversary.

The light novel series has also been translated into Chinese, Korean, and German. Tokyopop licensed the novels under the original title Kino no Tabi for release in North America, and the first volume was published on October 3, 2006. The chapter order of Tokyopop's English release of the first volume differed from the original Japanese release. According to Tokyopop representatives, there are issues with the licensor that have left them unable to release further volumes of the series. Tokyopop used an image from the sixth chapter-title page from the original novel for use as the English novel cover. In May 2021, Tokyopop confirmed its license for the series had expired. During its panel at New York Comic-Con 2026, Yen Press announced that it had licensed the series for English publication.

The first volume of a spin-off of the regular series titled Gakuen Kino was published on July 10, 2006, under Dengeki Bunko; as of May 2021, seven volumes have been released. The series is a collection of parodies originally published in three spin-off magazines of Dengeki hp: Dengeki p, Dengeki h, and Dengeki hpa. The spin-off features Kino as a magical girl in a school setting. Gakuen Kino was translated into Chinese and Korean.

=== Art books and manga ===
A 96-page art book containing illustrations by Kouhaku Kuroboshi was released by ASCII Media Works in March 2003. The book contained illustrations from Kino's Journey and the Allison series of light novels, which is created by the same people as Kino's Journey. Also included in the art book are original illustrations never released in the novel volumes, and an original Kino's Journey short story by Keiichi Sigsawa. Two more artbooks from Kouhaku Kuroboshi were released in commemoration of the novel series' 15th anniversary. These artbooks include illustrations from Kino's Journey up to the 18th volume, Gakuen Kino, all of the Allison light novels, and other novels by Keiichi Sigsawa, as well as artwork by Kouhaku Kuroboshi as Takeshi Iizuka.

Three picture books were also released by ASCII Media Works under their Dengeki Bunko Visual Novel label. The first, released on December 3, 2003, contained forty-eight pages and is entitled Country of Memories —Their Memories— (記憶の国 —Their Memories—, Kioku no Kuni —Their Memories—). The first picture book came bundled with an audio CD containing image songs (one of which is based on the tune of Pachelbel's Canon). The second book, released on October 19, 2005, contained eighty pages and is entitled The Traveler's Story —You— (旅人の話 —You—, Tabibito no Hanashi —You—). The second book was released in two editions, with the difference between the two being a DVD of the first animated film Kino's Journey: In Order to Do Something —Life Goes On—. The third book, released on December 25, 2007, contained 40 pages and is entitled My Country —Own Will— (わたしの国 —Own Will—, Watashi no Kuni —Own Will—). The third book came bundled with a DVD of the second animated film Kino's Journey: Country of Illness —For You—.

A manga adaptation of the spin-off series Gakuen Kino was illustrated by the dōjinshi group Dennō Ōwadan. It began serialization in volume 10 of ASCII Media Works' Dengeki G's Festival! Comic released on February 23, 2010. The manga continued serialization until volume 14 of Dengeki G's Festival! Comic published on October 26, 2010. It was transferred to ASCII Media Works' Dengeki G's Magazine with the December 2010 issue and ran until the June 2012 issue. It was compiled in three volumes. A manga adaptation of Kino's Journey, drawn by Iruka Shiomiya, was serialized in Kodansha's Shōnen Magazine Edge from March 17, 2017, to August 17, 2020. Its chapters were collected in eight tankōbon volumes. An English translation was published by Kodansha USA under the Vertical Comics imprint from February 2019 to April 2021. A second manga, with art by Gou, was serialized from the July 2017 issue of ASCII Media Works' Dengeki Daioh magazine released on May 27, 2017, to the February 2020 issue released on December 27, 2019. It was collected in five tankōbon volumes.

=== Anime ===
An anime adaptation produced by A.C.G.T and Genco, and directed by Ryūtarō Nakamura, aired on the WOWOW satellite television network between April 8 and July 8, 2003, containing 13 episodes. The anime series was also rebroadcast across Japan by the anime satellite television network Animax, which also aired the series across its worldwide networks in Southeast Asia, East Asia, and South Asia. The episodes were released on six DVD compilations released between June 18 and November 19, 2003; the first volume contained three episodes, while each of the subsequent volumes contained two episodes. The series was re-released on DVD in popular editions again in six volumes, with the first three volumes bundled together and sold on January 19, 2005, and the last three volumes bundled together and sold on February 16, 2005. In addition to the main series, there is also a 12-minute-long prologue titled "Episode 0: The Tower Country —Freelance—" which was released as an original video animation with the first animated film's DVD release on October 19, 2005. The anime's opening theme is "All the way" by Mikuni Shimokawa and the ending theme is "The Beautiful World" by Ai Maeda; both singles were released on June 18, 2003.

The 13-episode anime series was licensed for North American distribution by ADV Films. The episodes were initially released on four DVD compilations released between February 24, 2004, and June 29, 2004; the first volume contained four episodes, while each of the subsequent volumes contained three episodes. The first DVD volume was sold in two editions, with the difference between the two being a series box, which allowed all four DVDs to fit inside. A DVD box set entitled Kino's Journey: The Complete Collection was released on October 25, 2005, containing three discs. In 2009, the series was re-released on three DVDs in a single case. Re-releases also happened in 2011, 2013, and 2017, one of the three anime series currently distributed by them while being succeeded by Section23 Films. They announced that an SDBD set is also coming for a February 26, 2019, release.

A second anime television series adaptation titled Kino's Journey —the Beautiful World— the Animated Series aired 12 episodes between October 6 and December 22, 2017. It was animated by Lerche and produced by Egg Firm. The series is directed by Tomohisa Taguchi, with Yukie Sugawara supervising scripts and Ryoko Amisaki designing the characters. The opening theme is "Here and There" and the ending theme is "Satōdama no Tsuki" (砂糖玉の月), both by Nagi Yanagi. Crunchyroll streamed the series with original Japanese audio and English subtitles, and Funimation released the series with a simuldub.

==== Films ====
Two anime films have been created as part of the Kino's Journey series. The first, Kino's Journey: In Order to Do Something —Life Goes On.— (何かをするために—life goes on.—, Nanika o Suru Tame ni —life goes on.—) was produced by A.C.G.T and directed by Takashi Watanabe. It premiered in Japanese theaters on February 19, 2005. Spanning 30-minutes, the film is a prequel to the series, showing Kino being trained by her teacher, learning to ride Hermes, and discovering her naturally excellent marksmanship before eventually deciding to return the original Kino's coat to his mother. The ending theme for the first animated film is "Hajimari no Hi" (始まりの日) by Ai Maeda, and was released on Maeda's Night Fly album on March 16, 2005.

The second film, Kino's Journey: Country of Illness —For You— (キノの旅：病気の国 —For You—, Kino no Tabi: Byōki no Kuni —For You—), premiered on April 21, 2007, as one of the three movies released at Dengeki Bunko's Movie Festival. Produced by Shaft and directed by Ryūtarō Nakamura, it follows Kino and Hermes journey to a highly advanced country where the people live confined in a sealed environment. By request of her father, Kino tells about her travels to a sick girl who is hospitalized there. The second animated film's ending theme is "Bird" by Mikuni Shimokawa, and the single was released on March 14, 2007.

=== Other media ===
A Kino's Journey drama CD was available through mail order via volume fifteen of MediaWorks' now-defunct light novel magazine Dengeki hp released on December 18, 2001. The drama tracks on the CD were originally broadcast on ASCII Media Works' radio program Dengeki Taishō in 2001.

Kino's Journey has been adapted into two visual novel adventure games for the PlayStation 2 by Tycoon and ASCII Media Works. The first game, titled Kino's Journey —the Beautiful World—, was released on July 17, 2003, and a "best" version was later released on November 25, 2004. Most of the story for the first game is taken from volumes one, two, three, five, and six of the original light novels, but there is one scenario written specifically for the game by Keiichi Sigsawa. The original soundtrack for the first visual novel was released on July 24, 2003. The second game, titled Kino's Journey II —the Beautiful World—, was released on December 1, 2005, and a "best" version was later released on March 8, 2007. Like the first game, most of the story is taken from the light novels, but there is another original scenario written by Sigsawa. Additionally, the second game came bundled with a 36-page book entitled Various Stories —a Beautiful Dreamer— (いろいろな話 —a Beautiful Dreamer—, Iroirona Hanashi —a Beautiful Dreamer—) containing the story of the original scenario written for the game. Both of the visual novels were voiced, mainly using the same cast from the first anime series. At one time, ASCII Media Works had planned to release a version for the PlayStation Portable.

== Reception ==
=== Light novel ===
As of 2017, around 8.2 million copies of the novels have been sold in Japan. The first novel which was published in the US generated positive reviews. Newtype USA named it the Book of the Month for November 2006 and called it "inviting and addictive", while AnimeOnDVD said it "sucks you in", and "allows you to experience the journey" with the main character. The series has ranked six times in Takarajimasha's light novel guide book Kono Light Novel ga Sugoi!: second in 2006, fifth in 2007, sixth in 2008, twelfth in 2009, fifth in 2012, and fifth in 2013.

=== Anime ===
The Encyclopedia of Science Fiction described the 2003 adaptation of Kino's Journey as an excellent anime, praising its use of allegory to explore philosophical and social questions. It highlighted the series' depiction of societies whose attempts to establish utopias frequently result in dystopias, exploring themes such as individual freedom, technological progress, social conformity and the nature of reality. The encyclopedia also drew parallels between Kino's travels and the tradition of the wandering protagonist in Westerns, with Hermes serving as the equivalent of a horse and Kino reluctantly becoming involved in local conflicts. It noted the emotional impact of the final episode and considered the 2017 adaptation generally regarded as more faithful to the original light novels but inferior to the 2003 series.
