= Masamune (disambiguation) =

Masamune (正宗) (c.1264–1343 AD) was a Japanese swordsmith.

Masamune may also refer to:

== People ==
- Masamune (wrestler) (政宗; born 1974), a Japanese masked professional wrestler

=== Given name ===
- Date Masamune (伊達 政宗; 1567–1636), a Japanese samurai
- Masamune Shirow (士郎 正宗; born 1961), Japanese manga artist

=== Surname ===
- Hakuchō Masamune (正宗 白鳥; 1879–1962), a Japanese critic, novelist, and dramatist
- Masamune Atsuo (正宗 敦夫; 1881–1958), a Japanese literature researcher and poet
- Genkei Masamune (正宗 厳敬; 1899–1993), a Japanese botanist

== Characters ==
- Masamune, a nickname for main protagonist Masane Amaha from Witchblade
- Masamune Izumi (和泉 正宗), a character from the manga and anime Eromanga Sensei
- Masamune Kadoya (角谷 正宗), a character from the manga and anime Beyblade: Metal Masters
- Masamune Makabe (真壁 政宗), the titular character from the manga and anime Masamune-kun's Revenge
- Masamune Nakatsukasa (中務 正宗), a character from the manga and anime Soul Eater
- Masamune Okumura (奥村 正宗), the main protagonist of the manga and anime 2.5 Dimensional Seduction

== Other ==
- Masamune, a powerful sword in the Chrono video games
- Masamune, a recurring weapon in the Final Fantasy series
- Comic Blade Masamune (2002–2007), a bi-monthly Japanese shōnen manga magazine

== See also ==
- Muramasa
- Muramasa (disambiguation)
