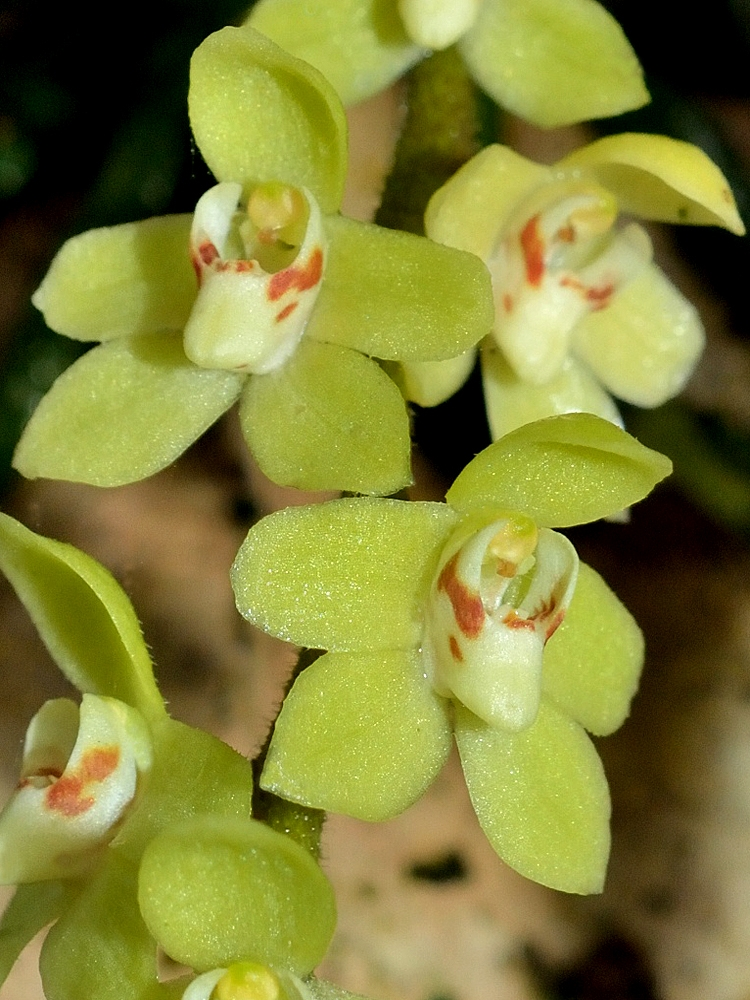

Scientific classification
- Kingdom: Plantae
- Clade: Tracheophytes
- Clade: Angiosperms
- Clade: Monocots
- Order: Asparagales
- Family: Orchidaceae
- Subfamily: Epidendroideae
- Genus: Chiloschista
- Species: C. segawae

Binomial name
- Chiloschista segawae (Masam.) Masam. & Fukuy

Synonyms
- Sarcochilus segawae Masam.; Thrixspermum segawae (Masam.) Masam.; Chiloschista segawae var. taiwaniana S.S.Ying; Chiloschista hoi S.S.Ying; Chiloschista segawae f. taiwaniana (S.S.Ying) S.S.Ying

= Chiloschista segawae =

Species of orchid

Chiloschista segawae is a species of leafless epiphytic or orchid that forms clumps with many radiating, flattened green roots. Up to fifteen, whitish green or yellow flowers are arranged along a pendulous flowering stem. It grows on trees in forest on Taiwan.

== Description ==
Chiloschista segawae is an epiphytic, leafless herb that forms clumps with many flattened greenish, photosynthetic roots up to 350 millimetres (14 in) long radiating from inconspicuous stems. Between six and fifteen slightly fleshy, whitish green or yellow resupinate flowers are arranged along a pendulous flowering stem 50–150 millimetres (2.0–5.9 in) long. The dorsal sepal is broadly elliptic, 3–5 millimetres (0.12–0.20 in) long, 2.5–4 millimetres (0.098–0.16 in) wide, the lateral sepals are broadly elliptic to egg-shaped, 4.5–6 millimetres (0.18–0.24 in) long, 3.5–4 millimetres (0.14–0.16 in) wide and the petals are elliptic, 4–6 millimetres (0.16–0.24 in) long, 3.5–4 millimetres (0.14–0.16 in) wide. The labellum is 5–6 millimetres (0.20–0.24 in) long with three lobes. The side lobes are erect and the middle lobe is small with a sac-like base. Flowering occurs from April to May.

== Taxonomy and naming ==
This orchid was first formally described in 1934 by Genkei Masamune who gave it the name Sarcochilus segawae and published the description in Transactions, Natural History Society of Formosa. In 1938, Masamune and Noriaki Fukuyama changed the name to Chiloschista segawae.

== Distribution and habitat ==
Chiloschista segawae grows on the trunks of trees in the forests of southern Taiwan at altitudes of between 700 and 1,000 m (2,300 and 3,300 ft).
