= Carex quadriflora =

Scientific classification
- Kingdom: Plantae
- Clade: Tracheophytes
- Clade: Angiosperms
- Clade: Monocots
- Clade: Commelinids
- Order: Poales
- Family: Cyperaceae
- Genus: Carex
- Species: C. quadriflora

Binomial name
- Carex quadriflora (Kük.) Ohwi

Synonyms
- Carex digitata var. pallida Meinsh.; Carex digitata subsp. quadriflora Kük.

Species of flowering plant

Carex quadriflora, the four-flower sedge, is a species of flowering plant in the family Cyperaceae, native to northeastern China, the Russian Far East, the Korean Peninsula, and Japan. Its chromosome number is 2n = 46.
