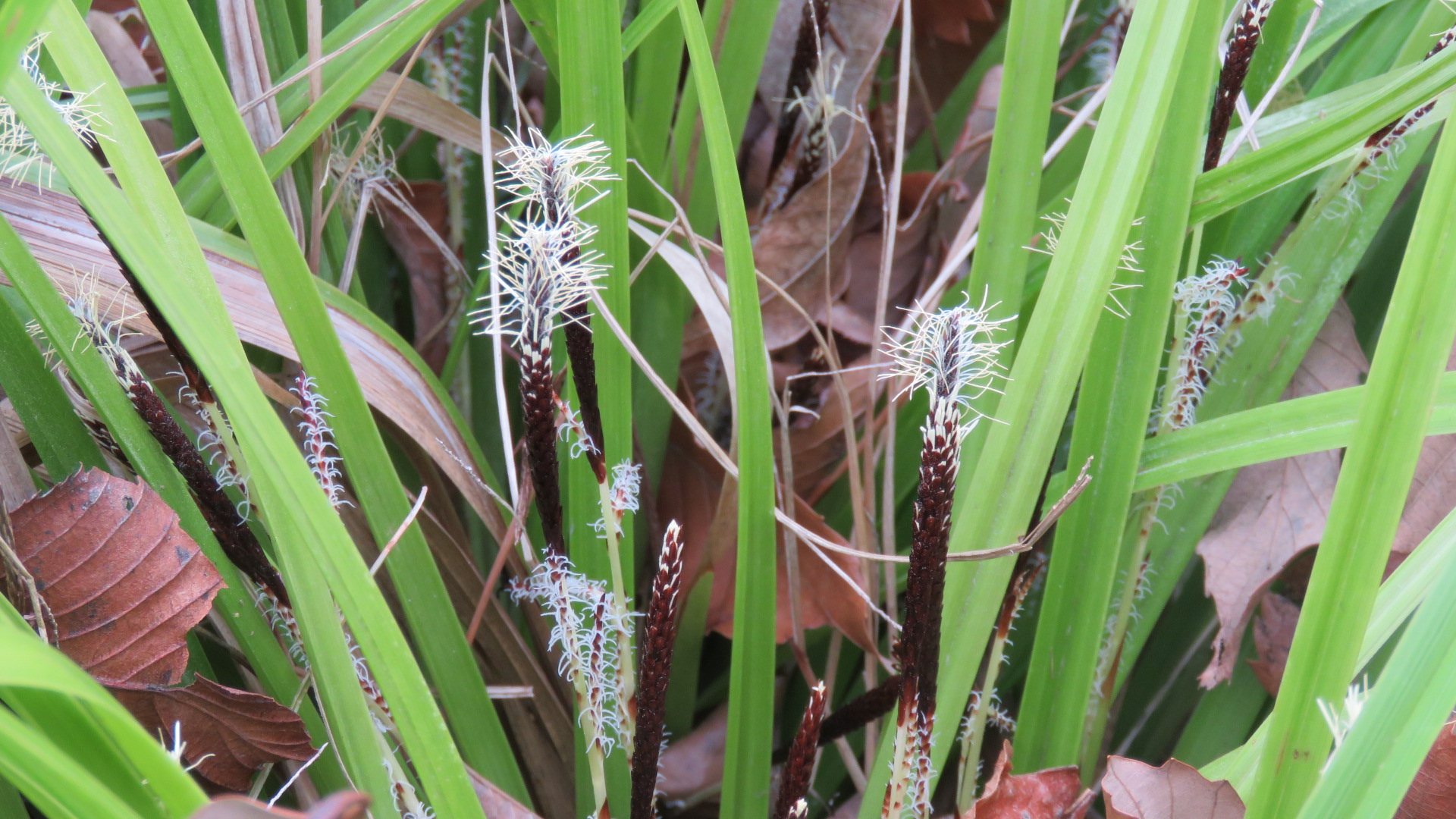

Scientific classification
- Kingdom: Plantae
- Clade: Tracheophytes
- Clade: Angiosperms
- Clade: Monocots
- Clade: Commelinids
- Order: Poales
- Family: Cyperaceae
- Genus: Carex
- Species: C. multifolia

Binomial name
- Carex multifolia Ohwi

Synonyms
- List: Carex atroviridis Ohwi; Carex dolichostachya subsp. multifolia (Ohwi) T.Koyama; Carex dolichostachya f. multifolia (Ohwi) T.Koyama; Carex dolichostachya f. pallidisquama (Ohwi) T.Koyama; Carex teramotoi T.Koyama; Carex yakusimensis Masam.

= Carex multifolia =

Species of grass-like plant

Carex multifolia is a species of flowering plant in the family Cyperaceae. It was first formally named in 1931 by Jisaburo Ohwi. It is found in Korea and Japan.
