= Carex brachyanthera =

Scientific classification
- Kingdom: Plantae
- Clade: Tracheophytes
- Clade: Angiosperms
- Clade: Monocots
- Clade: Commelinids
- Order: Poales
- Family: Cyperaceae
- Genus: Carex
- Species: C. brachyanthera

Binomial name
- Carex brachyanthera Ohwi

Synonyms
- Carex tricuspidata Kük.

Species of grass-like plant

Carex brachyanthera is a species of sedge that was first formally named by Jisaburo Ohwi in 1934. It is native to parts of eastern Asia and Oceania.
