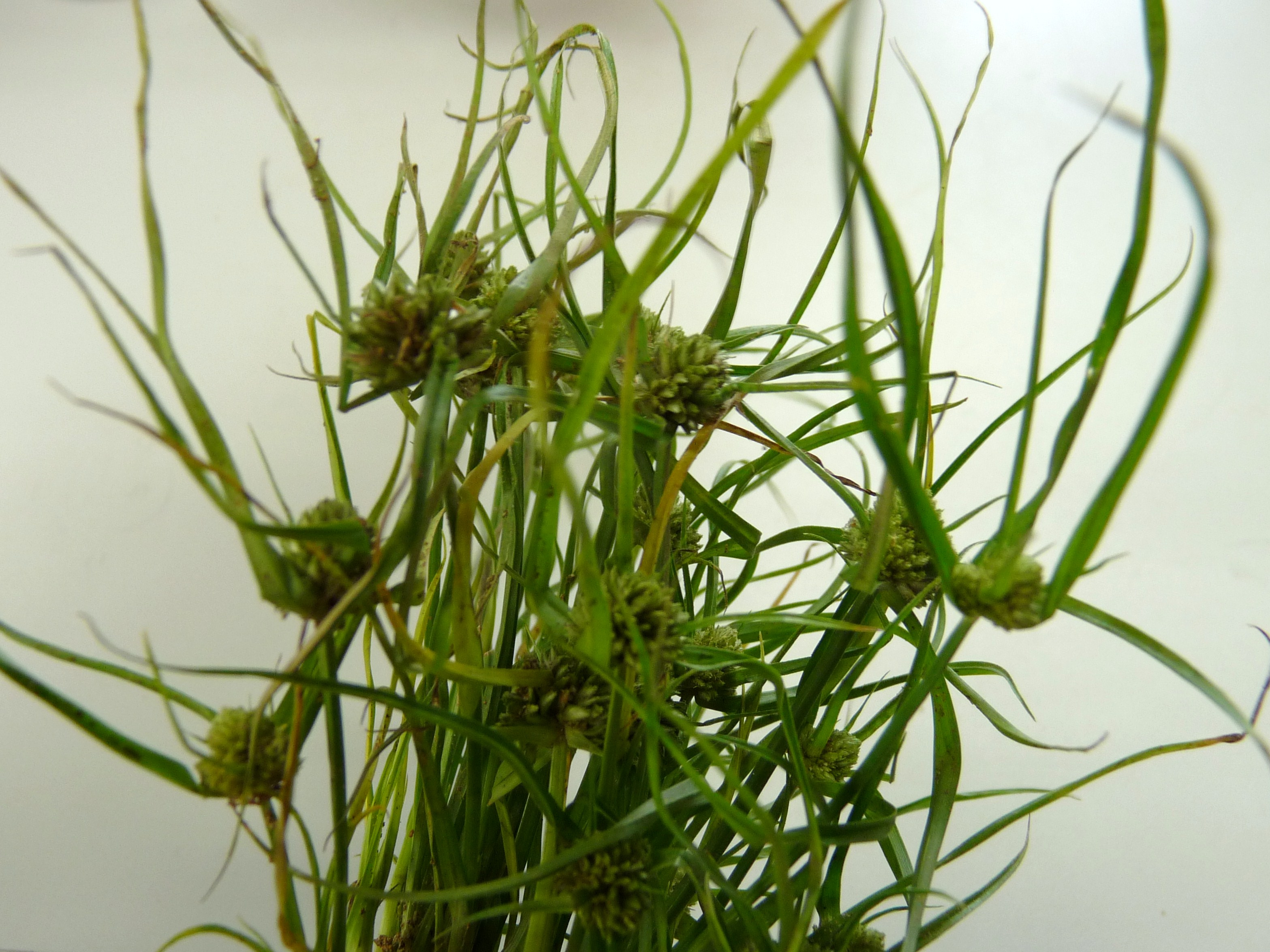
- Cyperus pacificus

Scientific classification
- Kingdom: Plantae
- Clade: Tracheophytes
- Clade: Angiosperms
- Clade: Monocots
- Clade: Commelinids
- Order: Poales
- Family: Cyperaceae
- Genus: Cyperus
- Species: C. pacificus

Binomial name
- Cyperus pacificus (Ohwi) Ohwi 1944

= Cyperus pacificus =

Species of sedge

Cyperus pacificus is a species of sedge that is native to north eastern parts of Asia.

== See also ==
- List of Cyperus species
