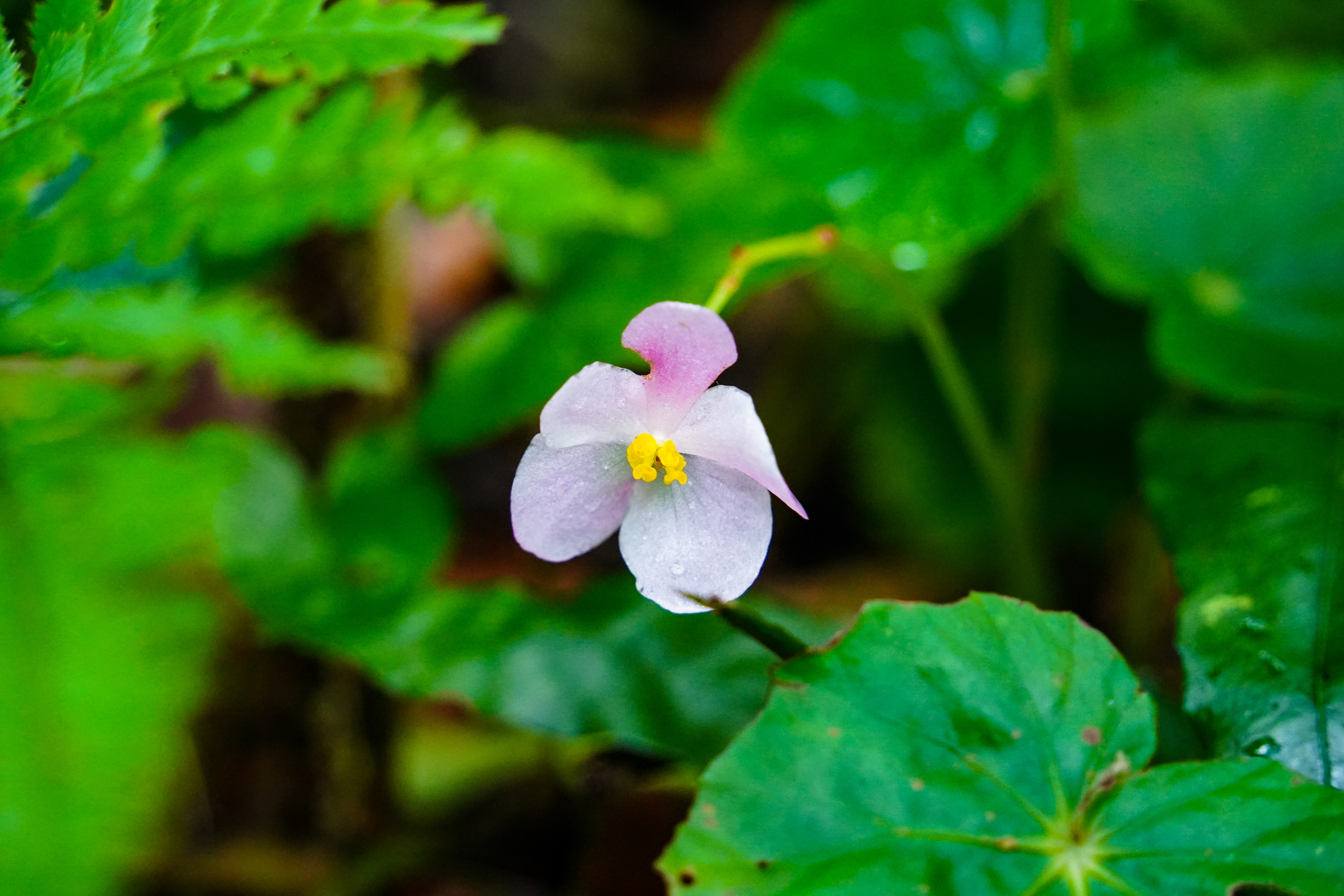
- Close-up of flower
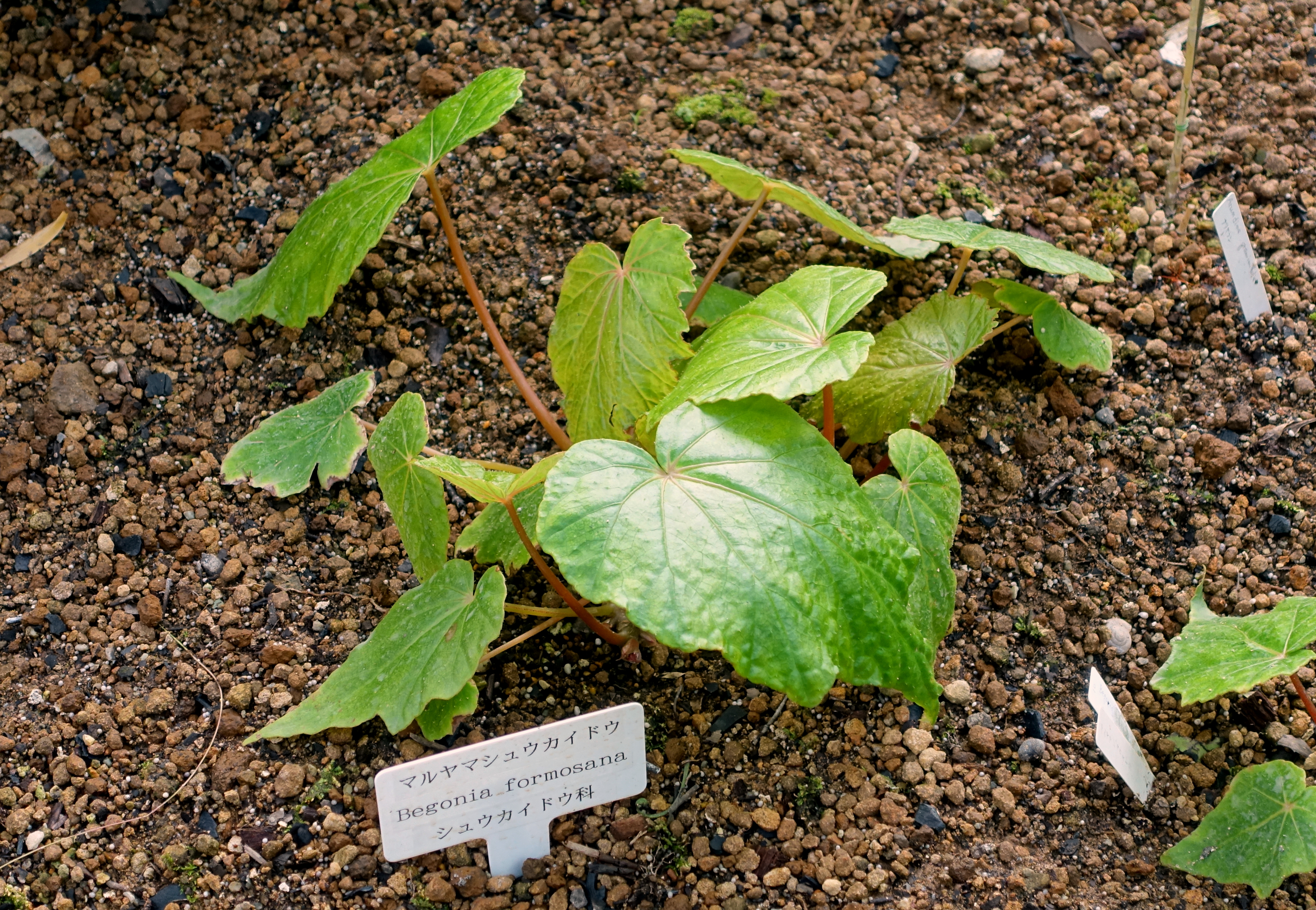
- Labeled specimen

Scientific classification
- Kingdom: Plantae
- Clade: Tracheophytes
- Clade: Angiosperms
- Clade: Eudicots
- Clade: Rosids
- Order: Cucurbitales
- Family: Begoniaceae
- Genus: Begonia
- Species: B. formosana

Binomial name
- Begonia formosana (Hayata) Masam.

Synonyms
- Begonia formosana f. albomaculata Tang S.Liu & M.J.Lai; Begonia laciniata var. formosana Hayata; Begonia tarokoensis M.J.Lai

= Begonia formosana =

Species of plant

Begonia formosana is a species of flowering plant in the family Begoniaceae, native to Taiwan and the Ryukyu Islands. It is found growing in forests in shady, moist situations at elevations from 700 to 900 m (2,300 to 3,000 ft).
