= Carex accrescens =

Scientific classification
- Kingdom: Plantae
- Clade: Tracheophytes
- Clade: Angiosperms
- Clade: Monocots
- Clade: Commelinids
- Order: Poales
- Family: Cyperaceae
- Genus: Carex
- Species: C. accrescens

Binomial name
- Carex accrescens Ohwi

Synonyms
- List: Carex accrescens var. sylvipaludosa Luchnik; Carex pallida C.A.Mey.; Carex pallida var. angustifolia Y.L.Chang; Carex pallida f. angustifolia (Y.L.Chang) Y.L.Chou; Carex pallida var. daubichensis Kom.; Carex pallida var. lefuensis Kom.; Carex pallida var. lithophiloides A.E.Kozhevn.; Carex pallida var. papillosa Kük.; Carex siccata subsp. pallida Kük. & Matsum.

Species of grass-like plant

Carex accrescens is a species of sedge that was first described by Jisaburo Ohwi in 1931. It is native to eastern Asia, from Siberia to the Korean Peninsula and Japan.
