= Heaven's Memo Pad =

Japanese light novel series

- Cover of Heaven's Memo Pad volume 1.

神様のメモ帳 (Kami-sama no Memo-chō)
- Genre: Mystery
- Light novel
- Written by: Hikaru Sugii
- Illustrated by: Mel Kishida
- Published by: ASCII Media Works
- Imprint: Dengeki Bunko
- Original run: January 25, 2007 – September 10, 2014
- Volumes: 9
- Manga
- Written by: Hikaru Sugii
- Illustrated by: Tiv
- Published by: ASCII Media Works
- Magazine: Dengeki Daioh
- Original run: August 2010 – September 2012
- Volumes: 3
- Anime television series
- Directed by: Katsushi Sakurabi
- Written by: Seishi Minakami
- Music by: Taku Iwasaki
- Studio: J.C.Staff
- Licensed by: AUS: Siren Visual; NA: Sentai Filmworks; UK: MVM Films
- Original network: Chiba TV, TV Saitama, TV Kanagawa, Tokyo MX, AT-X, MBS, CBC
- Original run: July 2, 2011 – September 24, 2011
- Episodes: 12

Heaven's Memo Pad (神様のメモ帳, Kami-sama no Memo-chō; lit. 'God's Memo Pad') is a Japanese light novel series written by Hikaru Sugii, with illustrations by Mel Kishida. ASCII Media Works published nine volumes between January 2007 and September 2014 under their Dengeki Bunko imprint. A manga adaptation illustrated by Tiv was serialized between the August 2010 and September 2012 issues of ASCII Media Works' Dengeki Daioh magazine. A 12-episode anime adaptation aired in Japan between July and September 2011.

== Plot ==
Narumi Fujishima is a high-school student who keeps himself uninvolved in school life to the point of not knowing most of his classmates' names. Because of some circumstances, he must participate in his school's "Gardening Committee", with Ayaka Shinozaki. He is also persuaded to join NEET, an amateur detective agency filled with unemployed slackers who take on and solve cases on their own. The NEET agency is led by "Alice", a childish, anti-social extreme shut-in, who never leaves her room full of computer monitors and stuffed animals. However, Alice has proven herself a resourceful hacker and an astounding detective. Throughout the series, Narumi, accompanied by the other members of NEET, solve crimes, including murders, using their limited resources and Alice's genius intellect.

== Characters ==
=== NEET Detective Team ===
Narumi Fujishima (藤島 鳴海, Fujishima Narumi)
Voiced by: Yoshitsugu Matsuoka (Japanese); Blake Shepard (English) (anime), Atsushi Abe (drama CD)
An ordinary 16-year-old high-school student who lives with his elder sister. He thinks he has become like this, alone and occupying time by himself, because he is always transferring schools dues to his dad's work. He is introduced to Hanamaru by his classmate Ayaka, through whom he meets Min, Alice, and the NEET Detective Team members.
Alice (アリス) / Yūko Shionji (紫苑寺 有子, Shionji Yūko)
Voiced by: Yui Ogura (Japanese); Hilary Haag (English) (anime), Minako Kotobuki (drama CD)
The mysterious female protagonist who lives on the third floor above the Hanamaru ramen shop. Her age is unknown, but looks like a 12- or 13-year-old girl. She has said that her diet has been heavy Dr. Pepper for more than 10 years. She is short and pale white and has long black hair. She calls herself Alice (a mixed reading of the kanji for Yūko) and a "NEET Detective". She is a hikikomori and a cracking genius. She has disclosed that she has never attended school, and that she ran away from home some time before deciding to become a NEET detective. Her diet contains little more than Dr. Pepper, orders of noodles, hold everything except the broth, and sometimes ice cream; on Min's insistence she sometimes eats vegetables, typically leeks. Min threatens to withhold the ice cream unless Alice eats something. She suffers from severe insomnia and tends to annoy people around her, eliciting angry responses. She usually wears bear-patterned pajamas and is typically surrounded by a pile of teddy bears. She is the brains of the NEET Detective Team and gathers information to solve the cases with her laptop without stepping out of her bedroom.
Ayaka Shinozaki (篠崎 彩夏, Shinozaki Ayaka)
Voiced by: Ai Kayano (Japanese); Brittney Karbowski (English) (anime), Yōko Honda (drama CD)
Narumi's classmate, an active and cheerful girl who works part-time at a ramen shop called Hanamaru. She was the only member of the gardening club, but made Narumi join her, starting a friendship with him. Soon after, she inexplicably jumps off the school roof, injuring herself and falling into a coma. This motivates Narumi to make a request to Alice: find out why she jumped off from the roof. Ayaka eventually recovers consciousness but suffers amnesia and does not remember anything about Narumi.
Min (明) / Ming-Li Huang (黄明麗, Fan Min-Lī)
Voiced by: Hitomi Nabatame (Japanese); Shelley Calene-Black (English) (anime), Fuyuka Oura (drama CD)
The current owner of the ramen shop Hanamaru, the one who takes care of the members of the NEET Detective Club. Her personality is generally brash and tomboyish, often talking to people with a tone usually more masculine than what her looks suggest. However, she is as caring inside as she is harsh, as proven by her unrelenting support for the NEET Detective Club in spite of its members not being able to return the favor.
Tetsu (テツ) / Tetsuo Ichinomiya (一宮 哲雄, Ichinomiya Tetsuo)
Voiced by: Masaya Matsukaze (Japanese); Adam Gibbs (English) (anime), Kenji Takahashi (drama CD)
One of the NEET Detective Team members, an ex-boxer addicted to gambling, especially dice games, pachinko, and horse races. He dropped out of Narumi's high school an unspecified number of years ago, and has connections with the local police.
Major (少佐, Shōsa) / Hitoshi Mukai (向井 均, Mukai Hitoshi)
Voiced by: Kouki Miyata (Japanese); Greg Ayres (English) (anime), Nobuhiko Okamoto (drama CD)
One of the NEET Detective Team members, a university student whose appearance is that of an elementary-school boy. He rarely attends classes and stays enrolled only to use the university library. He is a military otaku who spends most of his time playing survival games, is always carrying model guns and wearing a camouflage outfit, and is an expert on spying devices.
Hiro (ヒロ) / Hiroaki Kuwabara (桑原 宏明, Kuwabara Hiroaki)
Voiced by: Takahiro Sakurai (Japanese); David Matranga (English) (anime), Junji Majima (drama CD)
One of the NEET Detective Team members and the only one with a driver's license. Because of his very handsome and gentle appearance he is quite popular among girls, having numerous girlfriends at the same time. Narumi thinks of him as a gigolo. Hiro is often seen with two cellphones, writing romantic text messages to two different girls at the same time. He collects information or pictures and is an expert in investigation.

=== Other characters ===
The Fourth (四代目, Yondaime) / Sōichirō Hinamura (雛村 壮一郎, Hinamura Sōichirō)
Voiced by: Daisuke Ono (Japanese); Illich Guardiola (English) (anime), Kenta Miyake (drama CD)
The head and one of the founding members of a young NEET yakuza group called the Hirasaka Group. He has a ferocious look and a violent attitude. He hires Alice to find the source of the drug 'Angel Fix' in the first novel, and has hired her several times before and after. He often lends a hand to Alice's cases. He is also good at textile arts and responds to Alice's calls when one of her stuffed bears needs repair.
Meo (メオ) / Charunee Kusakabe (草壁チャルニー, Kusakabe Charunī)
Voiced by: Saki Ogasawara (Japanese); Cynthia Martinez (English)
A fourteen-year-old Thai girl with apparently brown skin whose father, Masaya Kusakabe, is a Japanese man who married a Thai woman who died in Japan. She has been in Japan since she was five, so she speaks Japanese fluently. Meo asks the NEET Detective Team to search for her missing father after he phones requiring her to take a bag containing two hundred million yen banknotes and leave for any safe place. Her nickname, Meo, is derived from "Maeo" (Thai: แมว; Thai pronunciation: [mæːw]), a Thai word meaning cat; her first name, Charuni (Thai: จารุณี), is a Thai word derived from Pāḷi, Cāruṇī, meaning a young pretty girl.
Renji Hirasaka (平坂 錬次, Hirasaka Renji)
Voiced by: Kenichi Suzumura (Japanese); Mike Yager (English)
The former leader and one of the founding of a young NEET yakuza group called the Hirasaka Group who broke his oath as a sworn brother to the Fourth after their roommate Hisan was supposedly killed. He is known as the person who originally designed the Hirasaka Group emblem, albeit unfinished.

== Media ==
=== Light novels ===
The Heaven's Memo Pad light novels are written by Hikaru Sugii, with illustrations by Mel Kishida. ASCII Media Works published nine volumes between January 2007 and September 2014 under their Dengeki Bunko imprint.

No.	Release date	ISBN
1	January 25, 2007	978-4-8402-3691-1
Narumi, who recently transferred to a new high school and spends most of his time alone is approached by one of his classmates, Ayaka, who forces him to join the gardening club where she is the sole member. She also introduces him to her workplace, a ramen shop called Hanamaru, where he meets a strange group of people: a gigolo, a military otaku and a drop-out ex-boxer addicted to gambling, all NEETs who form the NEET Detective Team, and their leader, a young girl called Alice who lives over the ramen shop. Narumi ends up working at the shop and also becomes Alice's assistant. A new drug, "Angel Fix" is spreading over the city, and Ayaka's brother seems to be involved. One day Ayaka jumps off the school roof injuring herself and falling into a coma. This motivates Narumi to make a formal request to Alice: find out why she jumped from the roof. The team then works to find Ayaka's brother, unveil who's selling the new drug, and what connection, if any, they have with Ayaka's actions.
2	June 25, 2007	978-4-8402-3888-5
One day a Thai girl holding a travel bag enters the ramen shop looking for the young detective. Her request is "please save my father". Her father disappeared telling her, Meo, to run away taking that bag and hide. The tension raises when inside the bag they found 200 million yen in cash. The team investigates in search for Kusakabe Masaya (Meo's father) and find out about Hello Corp. and its network involvement in embezzlement, yakuza, and using immigrant women for prostitution.
3	June 10, 2008	978-4-0486-7097-5
Ayaka has regained consciousness, but she suffers amnesia and doesn't remember her friendship with Narumi. When returning to the club activities, the student council president calls him to announce the gardening club will be dismantled. Unwilling to lose his and Ayaka's "place", he starts investigating the reasons and finds that four years before, one of the club founders died on the school grounds in a strange accident. The only witness was Tetsu, but he refuses to cooperate. Risking his friendship and even having the team against it, Narumi continues to investigate the past in order to protect their place.
4	July 10, 2009	978-4-0486-7910-7
During summer vacations Yondaime is organizing an event and Narumi helps with the promotion of the band. But the other founder of Hirasaka-gumi, the man who gave it its name, has returned to Tokyo. It seems something had happened between Hirasaka and Yondaime. Hirasaka acts friendly towards Narumi but then mobilizes a group to impersonate Hirasaka-gumi and tarnish its name, endangering the realization of the event.
5	May 10, 2010	978-4-0486-8543-6
1. "Details of Hanamaru Soup" (はなまるスープ顛末, Hanamaru Sūpu Tenmatsu); 2. "The Detective's Beloved Doctor" (探偵の愛した博士, Tantei no Ashita Hakase); 3. "Hero Manual for a Huge Idiot Chapter" (大バカ任侠入門編, Ōbaka Ninkyō Nyūmon-hen); 4. "The 21 Balls of That Summer" (あの夏の21球, Ano Natsu no 21-kyū)
This volume contains four short stories without a specific chronological order. A strange man shows up in the ramen shop ordering a different plate each time and leaves after just one sip, hurting Min's pride. At the same time, someone appears to be stalking Min and even stealing her sarashi. Min request Alice to find who that person is and stop him. A liquor shop very important to Alice is in danger. A big supermarket is trying to buy the land for a parking lot, plus some strange substance has appeared on its bottles leading its business to bankruptcy. The shop owner's son asks Alice to find who is altering their bottles which she agrees to do with all her strength. When Yondaime is still hospitalized, a phone call rings in Hirasaka-gumi office asking for a ransom. But without the head, Hirasaka-gumi is not more than a bunch of idiots, and they first think they kidnapped Alice. In reality it was a wrong number, supposedly addressed to the landlady of the building, and the kidnapped was her daughter. Is up to Narumi to take Yondaime role and lead the group to solve the case and rescue the girl. The game center where the team loves to play is being menaced by yakuza. If it doesn't shut down business, they will raise their rent to a point where it will go into bankruptcy and close anyway. The yakuza leader shows some interest on the virtual baseball game Narumi and the others are playing, and the team desperately wages a bet on a game: if the team wins, the yakuza will forgive the shop debts, but if they lose their game center is lost forever. What the NEET Detective Team didn't know is that the yakuza leader was waging on a real baseball game and not a virtual one. And what's worse is that he was a once a former pro player on the high school league.
6	February 10, 2011	978-4-0487-0272-0
"The last lecture of Gigolo master" (ジゴロ先生、最後の授業, Gigolo-sensei, Saigo no Jugyō)
Min's cousins Fan Honrei and Fan Shaorin come to the ramen shop looking for Min's father, Hanada Masaru, suspected of killing Honrei's fiancée. The Fan family is a strong name in the Chinese mafia, and to avoid shame on the name Honrei request Min to act as his fiancée for an engagement announcement. Shaorin claims to have contact with Masaru and tries to pass his request to Alice, but she rejects it. Hiro also shows his true feelings towards Min, and unveils that Honrei actually pretended to marry Min and is using the announcement and his influence to force her. Alice then accepts Hiro's request, to "destroy Min's engagement" and the team starts looking for Masaru before the mafia gets him as he is the only who knows what happened to Honrei's real fiancée. The volume concludes with a short story involving Shionji Gorō, Alice' granduncle and Hiro's mentor in the path of a gigolo.
7	July 10, 2011	978-4-0487-0691-9
8	September 10, 2011	978-4-0487-0810-4
9	September 10, 2014	978-4-0486-6728-9

=== Drama CD ===
Three drama CDs were produced by Lantis. The first, titled Oshare Sagi-shi no Matsuro (おしゃれサギ師の末路), was released on July 8, 2009. The second, titled Utahime no Kiken na Angle (歌姫の危険なアングル), was released on May 7, 2010. A third drama CD titled Shutter Chance no Uragawa (シャッターチャンスの裏側) was released on November 9, 2011, casting the same voice actors from the anime.

=== Manga ===
A manga adaptation illustrated by Tiv was serialized in ASCII Media Works' Dengeki Daioh between the August 2010 and September 2012 issues. Three tankōbon volumes were released between April 4, 2011, and August 27, 2012, under ASCII Media Works' Dengeki Comics imprint.

No.	Release date	ISBN
1	April 4, 2011	978-4-04-870329-1
2	September 27, 2012	978-4-04-870892-0
3	August 27, 2012	978-4-04-886931-7

=== Anime ===
An anime adaptation was announced in February 2011. It aired 12 episodes between July 2 and September 24, 2011, with J.C.Staff in charge of the animation. North American licensor Sentai Filmworks simulcast the series on The Anime Network, and released the series on DVD in 2012. The opening theme is "Kawaru Mirai" by ChouCho and the ending theme is "Asunaro" by Kenichi Suzumura.

No.	Title	Original release date
1	"The Two or Three Things I Know About Her"; Transliteration: "Kanojo ni Tsuite Shitteiru Ni, San no Kotogara" (Japanese: 彼女について知っている二、三の事柄)	July 2, 2011
Prologue: While walking through the hotel district Narumi Fujishima sees a girl jump from a window and rescued by group of young people. Later at school, Narumi encounters Ayaka Shinozaki and she coerces him into joining her newly-formed garden club. She takes him to the Hanamaru ramen shop owned by Min where she works. There he recognises the group of rescuers he saw earlier: Tetsuo Ichinomiya, Hitoshi Mukai, Hiroaki Kuwabara, all of whom are known as NEETs. He meets their leader Alice who uses technology to solve crimes. She shows him surveillance footage of a high school girl named Miku Kimura which he recognises as the scene when he first saw the NEETs. The NEETs are investigating the disappearance of a schoolgirl named Shoko Sakuma, a friend of Miku. Narumi goes with Hiroaki to see the Fourth, the leader of the Hirasaka Gang and to trace Satoshi. Narumi locates Miku, who explains that Shoko became enraged at Miku for always viewing her as a role model before she went missing. Shoko's body is found in a bathtub of ice at Satoshi's apartment with her wrist slit and Satoshi is detained for interrogation. Alice believes that the troubled Shoko just wanted to be friends with both Miku and Satoshi. Narumi starts working at the Hanamaru ramen shop.
2	"You and the Travel Bag"; Transliteration: "Kimi to Ryokō Kaban" (Japanese: 君と旅行鞄)	July 16, 2011
A Thai girl named Meo needs Alice's help finding her missing father named Masaya Kusakabe. She earlier received a phone call from her father, a business counselor formally from a yakuza organization, who tells her to take a bag, containing two hundred million yen inside, from the house and run away to a safe place. Meo now has to work and live at the Hanamaru ramen shop until the case is solved. The Fourth warns Narumi not to get involved in this case, but Narumi says that he is obligated to assist Alice in this. Narumi and Tetsuo later talk with Nemo, who says that Kusakabe, assigned as a launderer, ran away with three hundred million yen. The team needs to find out what happened with the missing hundred million yen and where Kusakabe could be hiding.
3	"What I Can Do For Those Two"; Transliteration: "Boku ga Futari ni Dekiru Koto" (Japanese: 僕が二人にできること)	July 23, 2011
The Kishiwata Group, the yakuza organization, pays a visit to the Hanamaru ramen shop to retrieve Meo, but Min keeps her cool and tells them to leave. Min shares her empathy for Meo to Narumi, saying that her father suddenly left, leaving her in charge of the ramen shop. The next day, Meo leaves a note saying she will find her father on her own. When Narumi finds Meo at a payphone near a convenience store, the two are cornered by the Kishiwata Group. Luckily, the Fourth and the Hirasaka Gang arrive and intervene, rescuing Narumi and Meo. The Fourth agrees to hold a ceremony to allow Narumi to be a part of his gang. Because Mikawa, the leader of the Kishiwata Group, cannot do anything to Kusakabe since the money is in Meo's hands, Narumi devises that it should be deposited into Kusakabe's bank account. He also bluffs by saying that the money would be transferred to Mikawa with Kusakabe's authorization. When the Kishiwata Group arrive at the bank, the Hirasaka Gang take them down. Meo is finally able to reunite with her father once again.
4	"A Full Account on Hanamaru's Soup"; Transliteration: "Hanamaru Sūpu Tenmatsuki" (Japanese: はなまるスープ顛末記)	July 30, 2011
A mysterious man with sunglasses who regularly eats ramen at the Hanamaru ramen shop always takes one sip and leaves some change before departing, and this is getting on Min's nerves. She then makes Narumi help her make a new soup dish. In the middle of the night, a suited stalker lurks inside the shop and steals one of Min's chest wraps before she finishes taking a bath. Min becomes so aggravated by this that she has no choice but to ask for Alice's help. The team believes that there is a connection between the mysterious man with sunglasses and the suited stalker. The following night, the team catches the suited stalker named Tomio Kimura, a lingerie designer for his company, who has much interest in Min's bust size. However, Alice deduces that the man with sunglasses somehow unlocked the front door at night, which then gave Kimura the chance to sneak into the shop during that time. The man with sunglasses is revealed to be Masaru Hanada, Min's father, who leaves a note containing a new recipe for ramen.
5	"He Knows About Me"; Transliteration: "Aitsu wa Ore o Shitte Iru" (Japanese: あいつは俺を知っている)	August 6, 2011
Narumi is held responsible to help a rebellious Alice wash her stuffed animals and bed sheets. However, The Fourth asks Narumi to advertise an all-girl rock band, performing at the end of the month, because the band previously broke their contract with another yakuza organization, the Yanagihara Group. Narumi goes around town with Ayaka for a few days, taking pictures for the website. At a local bar, he meets Renji Hirasaka, who seems to be into trouble with a gang wearing black. Narumi spills a drink on Renji's butterfly embroidered shirt as an excuse for Renji not to take them all on by himself. He compensates by buying Renji new shirts, later asking whether or not they should be friends. When he returns to the Hanamaru ramen shop, he notices Renji's dirty shirt is in his bag. Soon after, Narumi goes to the fabric store to pick up something for Min, but he is surprised to see the Fourth there as well, who is friends with Yoshiki, the store owner. A shipment of the butterfly embroidered shirts are found stolen in the storage room, something the Fourth must look into. After Narumi meets with Mika, the lead singer, for more ideas pertaining to the website, he goes to the zoo to buy a stuffed capybara toy as a favor for Alice.
6	"It Seems Like I'll Lose"; Transliteration: "Boku wa Makesō da" (Japanese: 僕は負けそうだ)	August 13, 2011
Renji runs into Narumi at the zoo, relieved to know that Narumi still has his butterfly embroidered shirt, and the two discuss spending time together as friends. As Narumi prepares to go to the warehouse, Renji warns him not to head that way, as it is seen that a fire has occurred there. Alice believes it was caused by the thief who stole the shipment of the butterfly embroidered shirts, to which the Fourth finds out that Renji happens to be that thief. It is explained that the Fourth and Renji were once "blood brothers" and formed the Hirasaka Gang to fight against yakuza organizations. When Narumi and Ayaka go out together, they are ambushed by Renji's men, but Tetsuo manages to come to the rescue. At night, Narumi receives a phone call from Renji to bring back his shirt the following morning. Alice, telling Narumi that Renji is near a sports utility store, is hesitant to let him go see Renji. So he leaves the shirt with Alice, and she lends him a stuffed owl toy for good luck.
7	"All I Can Do"; Transliteration: "Boku ni Dekiru Subete" (Japanese: 僕にできるすべて)	August 20, 2011
Before the Fourth and Renji split apart, they were roommates with a girl named Hisan. However, when the two had been up against the Gotuda Group, the Fourth used Hisan as a shield, which supposedly led to her death. Alice is already aware that Renji is planning to sabotage the upcoming rock concert, but Narumi continues on the promotional work regardless. Narumi helps Yoshiki decide of the logo design of the band T-shirt. The Fourth soon gives in to commission Alice to find Renji. Mika gives Narumi the original band T-shirt, but Ayaka wants one as well. Alice needs to confirm why the Fourth got paid off after the Gotuda Group had raided Hisan's apartment. Narumi understands that the head of the Gotuda Group had been actually after Hisan and not the Fourth. Moreover, Alice and Narumi conclude that Hisan was stabbed in the stomach by the head's ex-wife because Hisan was pregnant with his child.
8	"I Don't Believe in Fate"; Transliteration: "Boku wa Unmei o Shinjinai" (Japanese: 僕は運命を信じない)	August 27, 2011
The Fourth is sent to the hospital after Renji's men severely injures him and trashes his place. Mika leaves Narumi a voice message saying that she will handle the rest of the preparations for the concert. As such, Narumi is left in charge of the Hirasaka Gang. Alice strongly affirms that Renji and his men will indeed show up and crash the concert. Narumi calls Mika back to let her know that he will take care of the website himself. On the day of the concert, Narumi lures Renji into the studio booth when the rock band begins playing. Alice explains that after Hisan was slashed in the stomach, she lost her uterus and ovaries during the operation. The money given by the head of the Gotuda Group was used to open a fabric store, which reveals that Yoshiki is actually Hisan. The Fourth, still in bandages, later comes to confront Renji to a fistfight to honor the code of the "blood brothers". The concert went well with no complications, and the NEET Detective Team and the Hirasaka Gang celebrate for its success. The next day, as Renji prepares to leave by train, Narumi gives him back his butterfly embroidered shirt.
9	"That Summer's 21st Ball"; Transliteration: "Ano Natsu no 21-kyū" (Japanese: あの夏の21球)	September 3, 2011
At the apartment's arcade room, Nemo challenge Narumi and the others to a baseball game, wagering the rent of the arcade room. Thus, Alice will need to be the baseball coach for her team. Nemo happens to be a former player of an elite baseball team, so his reputation is on the line. As the baseball game plays out, it seems to be a close match. The Fourth, who is the pitcher for the team, starts to become weaker due to his declining health, forced to sit out for the remainder of the game. Alice fills in for the Fourth and successfully steals a base when she bats. Narumi, on his turn to bat, hits a bunch of foul balls but then hits a home run on his last shot, thereby winning the game.
10	"About You"; Transliteration: "Kimi nitsuite" (Japanese: きみについて)	September 10, 2011
Toshi Shinozaki, Ayaka's brother, appears at the arcade room, but he seems to be very ill. However, Narumi finds out from Tetsuo that Toshi is a drug addict, unbeknownst to Ayaka. The Fourth hears about drug trafficking in the area, in which a drug code-named "Angel Fix" is being marketed, and it turns out that this is the very drug that Toshi is taking. Ayaka, concerned about her brother, does not understand what Narumi is hiding from her. Narumi questions Ayaka if she sees him as Toshi's replacement, but this causes Ayaka to walk away in disgust. After they apologize to each other at school, Ayaka says that she does not see Narumi as a replacement, but rather someone unique to her. Tetsuo, Hitoshi, and Hiroaki research more about Angel Fix and its possible trade routes. The Fourth gives Narumi and Hiroaki documents of hospitalized drug victims in the past month for Alice to look through. Ayaka needs to remove the flower pots and boxes from the greenhouse because a school festival will be taking place soon.
11	"Fragments of Me"; Transliteration: "Boku no Kakera" (Japanese: ぼくのかけら)	September 17, 2011
Ayaka mysteriously jumps off the school's rooftop, injuring herself and falling into a coma for the past two weeks. Narumi asks Tetsuo to box with him, taking out his frustrations for what Ayaka did. This motivates Narumi to request Alice to find out why Ayaka would jump off the rooftop in the first place. From this point on forward, Narumi will become Alice's official assistant. Narumi goes inside the greenhouse, only to find all the plants gone, but the Fourth tells him to stay out of the investigation. Shiro Hakamizaka, a life science graduate, has recently published a thesis on botanical genetic manipulation, developing Angel Fix from a flower called Papaver bracteatum lindl, and Toshi has been able to buy the drug directly from him. Narumi believes that Ayaka blamed herself for Toshi's condition because she unknowingly planted these flowers, and this resulted in her attempted suicide. Tetsuo, Hiroshi, and Hiroaki are sent out to search for Toshi. After Narumi visits an unconscious Ayaka at the hospital, he receives a call from Toshi, who says that he had no idea why Ayaka jumped off the rooftop. Hakamizaka takes the phone from Toshi and tells Narumi that he challenges Alice to find out where he is.
12	"About You, Me and Her"; Transliteration: "Kimi to Boku to Kanojo no Koto" (Japanese: 君と僕と彼女のこと)	September 24, 2011
The Fourth interrogates a drug addict, who was carrying Ayaka's cell phone in his club, about Hakamizaka, but to no avail. After obtaining a sample of Angel Fix, Narumi figures out that all the drug victim can literally see "shining wings" as a hallucination. Much to a shock, he risks his life by taking this drug. The team monitors him in the streets as the drug takes full effect, as he begins to imagine Ayaka with wings, flying away from the rooftop. Narumi is brought back to Alice's room to recover, and the Fourth becomes Alice's client in this case. The NEET Detective Team and the Hirasaka Gang find a drugged Hakamizaka, among the other victims, inside a warehouse, who reveals that he forced Ayaka to take Angel Fix in exchange for flowers instead of money. Alice condemns Hakamizaka that he is not worthy to enter the kingdom of heaven, overwhelming his state of mind. Narumi knocks Toshio unconscious after seeing him on the floor, begging for more drugs to take. As the months go by, Narumi regularly visits Ayaka in the hospital, who is still in a comatose state. At night Alice takes Narumi to the school's rooftop and tells him that Ayaka jumped off the rooftop to prevent the school festival from occurring. As the sun rises over the school's rooftop, they see the flowers bloom in the design of the garden club logo, showing how much Ayaka cares about Narumi. It is seen that Ayaka eventually wakes up from her coma.

== Reception ==
As of July 2011, the light novels have sold over 1,000,000 copies in Japan. The light novel ranked at No. 10 in 2011 in Takarajimasha's annual light novel guide book Kono Light Novel ga Sugoi!. Theron Martin of Anime News Network published a positive review of the complete anime series in 2012. Despite his criticism towards Alice for being another moe archetype for the viewers and its glorification of NEETs, Martin praised the series for its well-conceived adaptation, its understated yet eclectic score and for tackling social issues found in Japan. He concluded by saying, "Overall, Heaven's Memo Pad is a very good series which falls short of being a great series...though the stories in between also have their moments."
