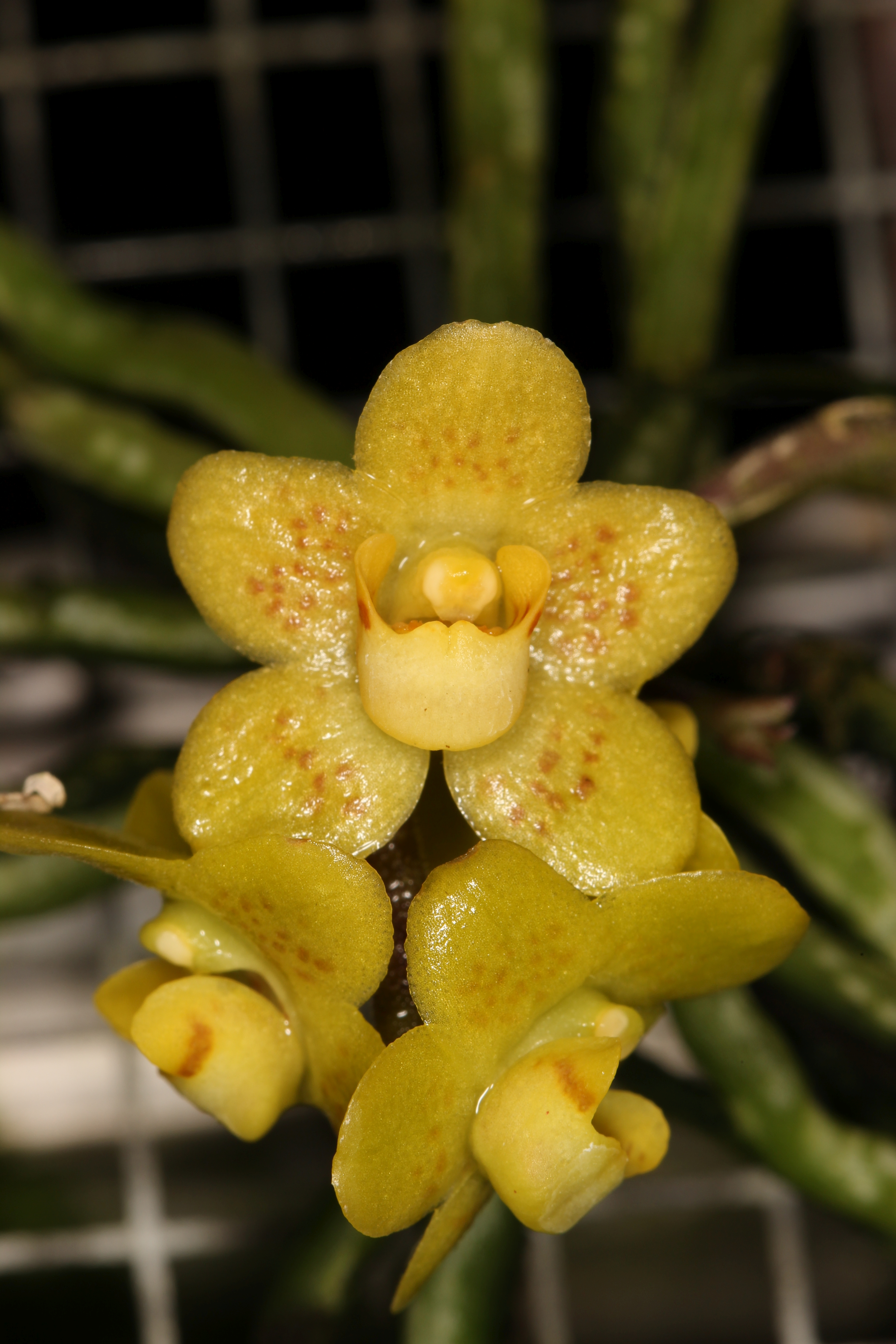
- Chiloschista trudelii

Scientific classification
- Kingdom: Plantae
- Clade: Tracheophytes
- Clade: Angiosperms
- Clade: Monocots
- Order: Asparagales
- Family: Orchidaceae
- Subfamily: Epidendroideae
- Tribe: Vandeae
- Subtribe: Aeridinae
- Genus: Chiloschista; Lindl.

Type species
- Chiloschista usneoides (D.Don) Lindl.

= Chiloschista =

Genus of orchids

Chiloschista, commonly known as starfish orchids and abbreviated Chsch., is a genus of usually leafless, epiphytic or lithophytic orchids found in India, Southeast Asia and Australia.

== Description ==
Orchids in the genus Chiloschista are epiphytic or lithophytic, usually leafless monopodial herbs with flat, green, photosynthetic roots radiating from a short, central rhizome. The flowers are arranged on long, thin flowering stems, open sporadically in groups and only last for a few hours to one or two days. They are small and resupinate, with the sepals and petals more or less similar in size and shape to each other but different from the labellum which has three lobes. The side lobes of the labellum are erect and larger than the middle lobe which is slipper-shaped.

== Taxonomy and naming ==
The genus Chiloschista was first described in 1832 by John Lindley in Edwards's Botanical Register. The name Chiloschista is derived from the Ancient Greek words cheilos meaning "lip" or "rim" and schistos meaning "split" or "divided".

About 30 species of Chiloschista are accepted by Plants of the World Online as at October 2025:

- Chiloschista bhutanensis Ghalley & Dalström
- Chiloschista breviseta Chanokkhun, Watthana & Schuit.
- Chiloschista confusa M.J.Matthew, J.Matthew, P.M.Salim & Szlach.
- Chiloschista densiflora Gyeltshen, C.Gyeltshen & Dalström
- Chiloschista eckhardii Vuong, Aver., V.C.Nguyen, Wojtas & Q.T.Truong
- Chiloschista extinctoriformis Seidenf.
- Chiloschista exuperei (Guillaumin) Garay
- Chiloschista fasciata (F.Muell.) Seidenf. & Ormerod
- Chiloschista gelephuensis C.Gyeltshen & Dalström
- Chiloschista glabrisepala Vuong, Aver. & V.S.Dang
- Chiloschista glandulosa Blatt. & McCann
- Chiloschista guangdongensis Z.H.Tsi
- Chiloschista himalaica Tobgay, C.Gyeltshen & Dalström
- Chiloschista javanica Schltr.
- Chiloschista lindstroemii Dalström & Kolan
- Chiloschista loheri Schltr.
- Chiloschista lunifera (Rchb.f.) J.J.Sm.
- Chiloschista parishii Seidenf.
- Chiloschista phyllorhiza (F.Muell.) Schltr. – white starfish orchid, (Australia)
- Chiloschista pulchella Aver. & K.S.Nguyen
- Chiloschista quangdangii Vuong & Aver.
- Chiloschista ramifera Seidenf.
- Chiloschista rodriguezii Cavestro & Ormerod
- Chiloschista segawae (Masam.) Masam. & Fukuy.
- Chiloschista shanica Wojtas, C.Bandara & Kumar
- Chiloschista sweelimii Holttum
- Chiloschista taeniophyllum (J.J.Sm.) Schltr.
- Chiloschista treubii (J.J.Sm.) Schltr.
- Chiloschista trudelii Seidenf.
- Chiloschista usneoides (D.Don) Lindl.
- Chiloschista viridiflava Seidenf.
- Chiloschista yunnanensis Schltr.
