= Chiloschista phyllorhiza =

White starfish orchid

Scientific classification
- Kingdom: Plantae
- Clade: Tracheophytes
- Clade: Angiosperms
- Clade: Monocots
- Order: Asparagales
- Family: Orchidaceae
- Subfamily: Epidendroideae
- Genus: Chiloschista
- Species: C. phyllorhiza

Binomial name
- Chiloschista phyllorhiza (F.Muell.) Schltr.

Synonyms
- Sarcochilus phyllorhizus F.Muell.; Thrixspermum phyllorhizum (F.Muell.) Rchb.f.; Thrixspermum phyllorrhizum (F.Muell.) Rchb.f. orth. var.

Species of orchid

Chiloschista phyllorhiza, commonly known as the white starfish orchid, is a species of leafless epiphytic or lithophytic orchid that forms small clumps with many radiating, flattened green roots. A large number of short-lived, crystalline white, star-shaped flowers with a yellow labellum are arranged along thin, arching flowering stems. It occurs in northern parts of Australia where it grows in rainforest, swamps and near streams.

== Description ==
Chiloschista phyllorhiza is an epiphytic or lithophytic, leafless herb that forms small clumps with many flattened greenish, photosynthetic roots 100–200 millimetres (3.9–7.9 in) long and 6–10 millimetres (0.24–0.39 in) wide radiating from inconspicuous stems. There is a large number of crystalline white resupinate flowers 10–14 millimetres (0.39–0.55 in) long and wide arranged along a thin, arching flowering stem 50–150 millimetres (2.0–5.9 in) long. The sepals and petals are egg-shaped, 4–6 millimetres (0.16–0.24 in) long, 3–4 millimetres (0.12–0.16 in) wide and spread widely apart from each other. The labellum is yellow, about 2.5 millimetres (0.098 in) long with three lobes. The side lobes are erect and the middle lobe is small and densely hairy. Flowering occurs from November to February but the flowers open sporadically in groups and only last for one or two days.

== Taxonomy and naming ==
The white starfish orchid was first formally described in 1866 by Ferdinand von Mueller who gave it the name Sarcochilus phyllorhizus and published the description in Fragmenta phytographiae Australiae. In 1921, Rudolf Schlechter changed the name to Chiloschista phyllorhiza. The specific epithet (phyllorhiza) is derived from the Ancient Greek words phyllon meaning "leaf" and rhiza meaning "root".

== Distribution and habitat ==
The white starfish orchid grows on trees near the edge of rainforest, on sheltered ridges, in swamps and near streams. It is found in the north of the Northern Territory, on some Torres Strait Islands and on Cape York Peninsula as far south as the Tully River.
