= Tiv (illustrator) =

South Korean illustrator (born 1981)

- Born: 25 February 1981 (age 45)
- Occupations: Illustrator, manga artist
- Known for: Masamune-kun's Revenge

Tiv is a South Korean female illustrator and manga artist born in Seoul. She is a Korea University graduate. Starting in 2005, she became a freelancer illustrator and debuted as manga artist with Annyeong!. In 2010, she moved her main activities to Japan and now lives at Saitama Prefecture.

== Works ==
=== Manga ===
- Annyeong! -We are Peanuts- (2007-2009, Futabasha)
- Bokura wa Minna Ikiteiru! (2010-2012, Ichijinsha)
- Heaven's Memo Pad - Hikaru Sugii (2010-2012, Dengeki Daioh)
- Komori Quintet! - Hikaru Sugii (2013-2015, Dengeki Daioh)
- Masamune-kun's Revenge - Hazuki Takeoka (2012-2019, Comic Rex)
- School! Scoop? (2012-2013, SD&GO!)

=== Light novels ===
- Ao Haru! - Shun Uchida (2012, MF Bunko J)
- Azukete! Jikan Ginkō-cho - Nobuki Itō (2009, Sneaker Bunko)
- Hiru mo Yoru mo, Ryōte ni Akujo-cho - Iko Torimura (2011, Gagaga Bunko)
- Ima, N Kaime no Kanojo - Garu Kobayashi (2016, Fujimi Shobo)
- Inutsuki-san - Yōsuke Karabe (2009, Square Enix)
- Manga no Kami-sama - Ikko Sono (2015–present, Dengeki Bunko)
- Masamune-kun's Revenge Novel - Hazuki Takeoka (2013 & 2016, Ichijinsha Bunko)
- Shitashii Kimi to no Mishiranu Kioku - Yu Kudo (2017, Famitsu Bunko)
- Shōjo Kaidan - Chiya Fujino (2008, Bungei Shunjū)
- Shugei Onna - Ritsuko Nosaka (2015, TO Books)
- Yoshi Yume ga Kuru! - Taeko Higashi (2013-2015, Aoi Tori Bunko)

=== Character designs ===
- Idol Incidents
- Two Car

=== Others ===
- Eromanga Sensei (Sagiri's illustrations; anime only)
