= Muramasa (disambiguation) =

Muramasa was a famous Japanese swordsmith who founded the Muramasa school of sword-making in the early 16th century CE.

Muramasa may also refer to:

- Muramasa: The Demon Blade, a 2009 video game for the Wii, later released as Muramasa Rebirth on PS Vita and Muramasa: Revenant Blades on the Nintendo Switch, Nintendo Switch 2, Playstation 5, and Steam
- Mura Masa, UK electronic music artist
- Muramasa (comics), Marvel Comics character
- Muramasa Blade, a fictional sword in Marvel Comics used by Wolverine
- Muramasa, a filler antagonist in the anime series Bleach
- Full Metal Daemon: Muramasa, a 2009 visual novel by Nitroplus
- Senji Muramasa, a character in the video game Fate/Grand Order
- "Muramasa", a song by progressive metal band Periphery
