= Cyperus ohwii =

Scientific classification
- Kingdom: Plantae
- Clade: Tracheophytes
- Clade: Angiosperms
- Clade: Monocots
- Clade: Commelinids
- Order: Poales
- Family: Cyperaceae
- Genus: Cyperus
- Species: C. ohwii

Binomial name
- Cyperus ohwii Kük.

Species of plant found in Asia and Australia

Cyperus ohwii is a species of sedge that occurs across parts of Asia and Australia.

The species was first formally described by the botanist Georg Kükenthal in 1931.

== See also ==
- List of Cyperus species
