= Masamune-kun's Revenge =

Japanese manga series

- The cover of the first volume featuring the character Aki Adagaki.

政宗くんのリベンジ (Masamune-kun no Ribenji)
- Genre: Romantic comedy
- Manga
- Written by: Hazuki Takeoka
- Illustrated by: Tiv
- Published by: Ichijinsha
- English publisher: NA: Seven Seas
- Imprint: Rex Comics
- Magazine: Monthly Comic Rex; (2012–2019); Comic Howl; (2023)
- Original run: October 27, 2012 – December 26, 2023
- Volumes: 13 + 1 extra (Note: Titled as Volume 0)
- Series titles
- Masamune-kun's Revenge; (October 27, 2012 – June 27, 2018, 10 volumes); Masamune-kun's Revenge After School; (September 27, 2018 – January 26, 2019, 1 volume); Masamune-kun's Revenge engagement; (April 26, 2023 – December 26, 2023, 2 volumes)
- Light novel
- Written by: Hazuki Takeoka
- Illustrated by: Tiv
- Published by: Ichijinsha
- Imprint: Ichijinsha Bunko
- Published: December 20, 2013
- Volumes: 1
- Anime television series
- Directed by: Mirai Minato
- Produced by: List: Oshi Yoshinuma; Takashi Okada; Hideyuki Saida; Mika Shimizu; Yōhei Kisara; Shunsuke Matsumura; Jun Fukuda Yoshiyuki Shioya; Yukihiro Itō
- Written by: Michiko Yokote
- Music by: Tatsuya Kato
- Studio: Silver Link
- Licensed by: Crunchyroll (streaming); SA/SEA: Medialink
- Original network: Tokyo MX, KBS, Sun TV, AT-X, BS Fuji
- Original run: January 5, 2017 – March 23, 2017
- Episodes: 12 + OVA
- Anime television series

Masamune-kun's Revenge R
- Directed by: Mirai Minato
- Produced by: List: Oshi Yoshinuma; Hisato Usui; Takashi Jinguuji; Shinji Oomori; Fumihiro Ozawa; Shouta Watase; Yuuki Konishi; Yuki Makimoto; Haruna Hirose
- Written by: Michiko Yokote
- Music by: Tatsuya Kato
- Studio: Silver Link
- Licensed by: Crunchyroll (streaming); SA/SEA: Medialink
- Original network: Tokyo MX, BS11, AT-X, Sun TV, KBS
- Original run: July 3, 2023 – September 18, 2023
- Episodes: 12
- icon

Masamune-kun's Revenge (Japanese: 政宗くんのリベンジ, Hepburn: Masamune-kun no Ribenji) is a Japanese manga series written by Hazuki Takeoka and illustrated by Tiv. The series is published by Ichijinsha and was serialized in their Monthly Comic Rex magazine in Japan from October 2012 to June 2018. A sequel manga, titled Masamune-kun's Revenge engagement, was serialized on Ichijinsha's Comic HOWL website from April to December 2023. The series is licensed by Seven Seas Entertainment in the United States. An anime television series adaptation by Silver Link aired from January to March 2017. The second season aired from July to September 2023.

== Plot ==
Masamune Makabe was a chubby boy who had a close relationship with Aki Adagaki, a beautiful wealthy girl, until one day she cruelly rejected him and gave him the nickname "Pig's Foot". Seeking revenge against his tormentor, Masamune changed his name, began dieting and working out every day to become a fit and handsome, albeit vain, high school student. When he encounters Aki once again, she does not recognize him and he commits to seduce her into falling in love with him before embarrassingly rejecting her to exact vengeance. Masamune ends up allying with Aki's classmate and servant Yoshino Koiwai, who seems to know Masamune's nickname as well.

== Characters ==
Masamune Makabe (真壁 政宗, Makabe Masamune)
Voiced by: Natsuki Hanae (Japanese); Jessie James Grelle (English)
Masamune Makabe is the titular protagonist of the series. He is a handsome boy, but he was once a chubby kid that people liked to make fun of. In his childhood, he befriended Aki Adagaki but was brutally rejected by her after his love confession and nicknamed him "Piggy" (豚足, Tonsoku; Pig's foot), causing him to undergo several diets and training and also changed his family name thanks to his grandfather. He's also committed to getting revenge on Aki; planning to make Aki fall in love with him and then cruelly reject her – calling this his "Dead or Love Plan". When Yoshino confesses that she was the real culprit, Masamune is torn as to how he should reconcile with Aki. In a turn of events, Masamune properly affirms his love for Aki in the end.
Aki Adagaki (安達垣 愛姫, Adagaki Aki)
Voiced by: Ayaka Ōhashi (Japanese); Morgan Garrett, Alexis Tipton (young) (English)
Aki comes from a well-off family and is known for her brutal treatment of men. As a result, she has gained the nickname "Cruel Princess" (残虐姫, Zangyaku Hime) from her classmates. She allegedly rejected Masamune and gave him the nickname "Pig's foot" when the two were children leading to his transformation and commitment to revenge. It was later revealed that she had a crush on Masamune during their childhood and that her hatred of men stemmed from the incident of his "sudden departure" without saying anything and leaving Aki heartbroken. When Masamune finally inquires about the past, Aki tells him that she never called chubby Masamune "Pig's foot" in the first place and has never even heard of that nickname before. As Aki realizes Masamune's true identity, she attempts to make him the same chubby boy he used to be. Aki mentions she found his chubbiness "cute" and overall as a symbol of wealth, implying that chubby guys are her type. After she reads Masamune's entitles of revenge and hears Yoshino's regrets, Aki decides to fix everything. With the misunderstood vengeance cleared up, Aki can't help but accept Masamune's heart.
Yoshino Koiwai (小岩井 吉乃, Koiwai Yoshino)
Voiced by: Inori Minase (Japanese); Monica Rial (English)
Yoshino is Aki's maid and follower. She seems to be a clumsy girl. However, beneath her clumsy and shy appearance, she is actually extremely deceptive and cold, able to deceive and hurt Aki without a second thought. Unlike Aki, Yoshino easily gained weight from sweets. Later, it was revealed that Yoshino had disguised herself as Aki eight years before, rejected Masamune, and gave him the nickname "Pig's foot" due to jealousy towards Aki's affection for him, but soon realized that her actions caused Aki to become estranged towards men. Ever since then she'd been regretting this and attempted to repay what she had done once Aki and Masamune reunited in high school. During the course of the story, in her attempts to set up Masamune and Aki, she becomes infatuated with Masamune. Aki learns of this and so she rejects Masamune and encourages Yoshino to be true to her feelings. However, Masamune refuses her confession and so Yoshino becomes determined to reunite them. Due to her and Masamune's efforts, Aki finally becomes true to her affection towards Masamune and they make up in the end with a kiss.
Neko Fujinomiya (藤ノ宮 寧子, Fujinomiya Neko)
Voiced by: Suzuko Mimori (Japanese); Megan Shipman (English)
Neko is a frail girl who comes from a wealthy family. She transferred to the school that Masamune is attending and confessed her love soon afterward. Masamune rejects her feelings but she continues to support his choices. It is later revealed that Neko also used to be chubby and that she had fallen in love with him when they were children. Neko confronts Masamune with this info that he had forgotten when he starts doubting his feelings towards Aki. She tells him that she has also fallen in love with the person "that he is now". Due to her habit of not wearing any panties, Aki and Yoshino nicknamed her the "Commando Princess". On White Day, Neko tempts Aki to break up with Masamune, but despite learning about Neko's knowledge of Masamune's revenge she continues to pursue him anyway.
Tae Futaba (双葉 妙, Futaba Tae)
Voiced by: Azusa Tadokoro (Japanese); Caitlin Glass (English)
Masamune's class rep who claimed to have confessed her feelings to Masamune once, but got rejected.
Kojūrō Shuri (朱里 小十郎, Shuri Kojūrō)
Voiced by: Saori Hayami (Japanese); Justin Briner (English)
Masamune's best friend looks like a girl but is actually a guy. This is oftentimes joked on throughout the series, like when Futaba tried to make him wear a girl bikini.
He has a crush on Neko and has difficulties expressing himself to her. He loves sweets and pastries and is a master at that art. He has helped Masamune on choosing some for Aki for White Day.
Kanetsugu Gasō (雅宗 兼次, Gasō Kanetsugu)
Voiced by: Mitsuki Saiga (Japanese); Ryan Reynolds (English)
A chubby individual who claimed to be "Masamune" – Aki's childhood friend in the past. Later on, it is revealed that Kanetsugu is a female pretending to be a male. She disguised herself as Masamune so she could marry into the Adagaki family in an attempt to save her family from poverty and her hospitalized sister. After her true gender is exposed in a confrontation with Makabe, she starts working part-time at school.
Muriel Besson (ミュリエル・ベッソン, Myurieru Besson)
Voiced by: Miku Itō (Japanese); Reshel Mae (English)
A young French student with a keen interest in the Japanese culture (especially manga). She uses Masamune as a model of her hero and Aki as the heroine for her manga story. This eventually pays off for her as her stories gets better when she finshes a manga sketch entirely based on Masamune and Aki's convoluted past and present.
Frank Besson (フランク・ベッソン, Furanku Besson)
Voiced by: Yasuyuki Kase (Japanese); Derick Snow (English)
Muriel's older brother, as well as the boss of a Milieu. He enjoys spoiling his own sister very much.

== Media ==
=== Manga ===
Writer Hazuki Takeoka and Korean female artist Tiv began serializing the manga in the December 2012 issue of Ichijinsha's shōnen manga magazine Monthly Comic Rex on October 27, 2012. Ten tankōbon volumes were released between April 2013 and July 2018. A spin-off titled "Masamune-kun's Re??? (Somehow))" (政宗くんのリ○○○（リなんとか）, Masamune-kun no Ri○○○ (Nantoka)) is drawn by Yūki Shinichi and is serialized on Gekkan ComicREX starting from November 2016 issue. North American publisher Seven Seas Entertainment announced that they had licensed the series on September 4, 2015. The series concluded in 2018, with the final chapter being released on June 27. Volume 0, a collection of extra chapters not published in the original volumes, was released on April 27, 2017. Takeoka and Tiv launched an epilogue manga in Monthly Comic Rex on September 27, 2018. The short manga, titled Masamune-kun no Revenge After School (政宗くんのリベンジ, Masamune-kun no Ribenji after school), is a series of after-stories focusing on various characters. The short manga was released in tankōbon as 11th volume of the main series. A sequel manga, Masamune-kun's Revenge engagement, began serialization on Ichijinsha's new Comic Howl manga website on April 26, 2023, and ended on December 26 of the same year. The sequel was released in tankōbon as 12th and 13th volume of the main series.

No.	Original release date	Original ISBN	English release date	English ISBN
1	April 27, 2013	978-4-7580-6372-2	June 14, 2016	978-1-626922-2-59
Chapter 1: The Man They Call "Pig-Legs"; Chapter 2: Cinderella Ain't Smiling; Chapter 3: A Simple Exchange of Addresses; Chapter 4: Yoshin's Magic Show
2	July 27, 2013	978-4-7580-6403-3	September 13, 2016	978-1-626923-28-7
Chapter 5: Students Should Study; Chapter 6: The Shoujo Manga Method; Chapter 7: Clear and Present Danger; Chapter 8: Enter the Cat; Chapter 9: Cherry Bomb
3	March 27, 2014	978-4-7580-6432-3	December 6, 2016	978-1-626923-66-9
Chapter 9.5: Investigative Report: Adagaki Aki; Chapter 10: Stress, Poolside; Chapter 11: Q&A For Each; Chapter 12: Shocker! Home Invasion!; Chapter 12.5: A Fine Tradition of Stewardship; Chapter 13: Incident at Tsunade Island (Part 1)
4	September 27, 2014	978-4-7580-6471-2	March 7, 2017	978-1-626924-38-3
Chapter 14: Incident at Tsunade Island (Part 2); Chapter 14.5: Incident at Tsunade Island (Part 3); Chapter 15: Incident at Tsunada Island (Part 4); Chapter 16: Not You; Chapter 17: Lost Child Lost; Chapter 18: They Might Call It Love
5	April 27, 2015	978-4-7580-6497-2	July 13, 2017	978-1-626924-93-2
Chapter 19: New Term Misgivings; Chapter 20: Another Masamune-kun; Chapter 20.5: Kojuro Wants to Be a Dandy; Chapter 21: Culture Fests are Hotbeds of Conspiracy; Chapter 22: A Plan Called "F"; Chapter 23: Yasaka Fest's Snow White (Part 1)
6	November 27, 2015	978-4-7580-6552-8	October 3, 2017	978-1-626925-61-8
Chapter 24: Yasaka Fest's Snow White (Part 2); Chapter 25: Yasaka Fest's Snow White (Part 3); Chapter 26: Yasaka Fest's Snow White (Part 4); Chapter 27: Yasaka Fest's Snow White (Part 5); Chapter 28: End of the Ball, End of It All; Chapter 29: Don't Let Go of the Mic Even If It Kills You
7	June 27, 2016	978-4-7580-6590-0	January 23, 2018	978-1-626926-73-8
Chapter 30: The Wee Parisian Mademoiselle; Chapter 31: What is Love (Comedy)?; Chapter 32: Free Time is Freedom; Chapter 33: A Witch, a Fat Man, a Boy, and a Girl; Chapter 34: The Princess's Confession
8	January 27, 2017	978-4-7580-6641-9 (RE); 978-4-7580-6642-6 (SE)	June 19, 2018	978-1-626928-05-3
Chapter 35: Pig-Legs' Memorial; Chapter 36: Coming Back When Nigh All Is Forgotten; Chapter 37: Guesses and Answers; Chapter 38: I Could Never Love You, Pig-Legs!; Chapter 39: Making Up For Lost Time
0	April 27, 2017	978-4-75806-650-1	—	—
9	February 5, 2018	978-4-7580-6706-5 (RE); 978-4-7580-6707-2 (SE)	February 26, 2019	978-1-626929-44-9
Chapter 40: Newly Minted Boyfriend and Girlfriend; Chapter 41: Second Date (sans Hadapure); Chapter 42: Who am I?; Chapter 43: A Futile Confession; Chapter 44: Some Things You're Better Off Not Noticing
10	July 27, 2018	978-4-7580-6730-0 (RE); 978-4-7580-6731-7 (SE)	May 28, 2019	978-1-642750-80-5
Chapter 45: St. Valentine Is Watching; Chapter 46: Whiteout; Chapter 47: Liar vs. Liar; Chapter 48: People Say Happiness Lives in the Distant Sky Beyond the Mountains; Chapter 49: Dead or Love?
11	April 26, 2019	978-4-7580-6799-7	May 12, 2020 (digital); June 16, 2020 (physical)	978-1-64505-454-2
Chapter 50: Adagaki Aki; Chapter 51: Futaba Tae; Chapter 52: Shuri Kojuro; Chapter 53: Fujinomiya Neko; Chapter 54: Koiwai Yoshino; Chapter 55: Muriel Besson; Chapter 56: Makaba Masamune
12	July 27, 2023	978-4-75808-436-9	—	—
13	December 26, 2023	978-4-75808-463-5	—	—

=== Light novel ===
A light novel adaptation by Hazuki Takeoka, with art by Tiv, has been published by Ichijinsha in a single volume released on December 20, 2013.

No.	Japanese release date	Japanese ISBN
1	December 20, 2013	978-4-7580-4509-4

=== Anime ===
On June 23, 2016, publisher Ichijinsha announced that the series would receive an anime television series adaptation. The anime is produced by Silver Link and directed by Mirai Minato, with Michiko Yokote supervising the scripts, and Yokote and Kento Shimoyama writing the scripts, featuring character designs by Yūki Sawairi. Toshiki Kameyama is the series' sound director while Lantis produced the music. The opening theme is "Wagamama Mirror Heart" (ワガママMIRROR HEART, "Selfish Mirror Heart") performed by Ayaka Ōhashi, and the ending theme is "Elemental World" performed by ChouCho. The AT-X broadcast uses the song "Manazashi Silent" (まなざしサイレント, Manazashi Sairento; "Silent Gaze") as its ending theme; it was sung by Ōhashi and Suzuko Mimori under their respective character names Aki Adagaki and Neko Fujinomiya. The series aired from January 5 to March 23, 2017. It was broadcast on Tokyo MX, AT-X, and BS Fuji. The anime ran for 12 episodes and was released across six BD/DVD volumes. Crunchyroll streamed the series, while Funimation produced an English dub. An OVA of the series has been released and tells an "after story" for the manga.

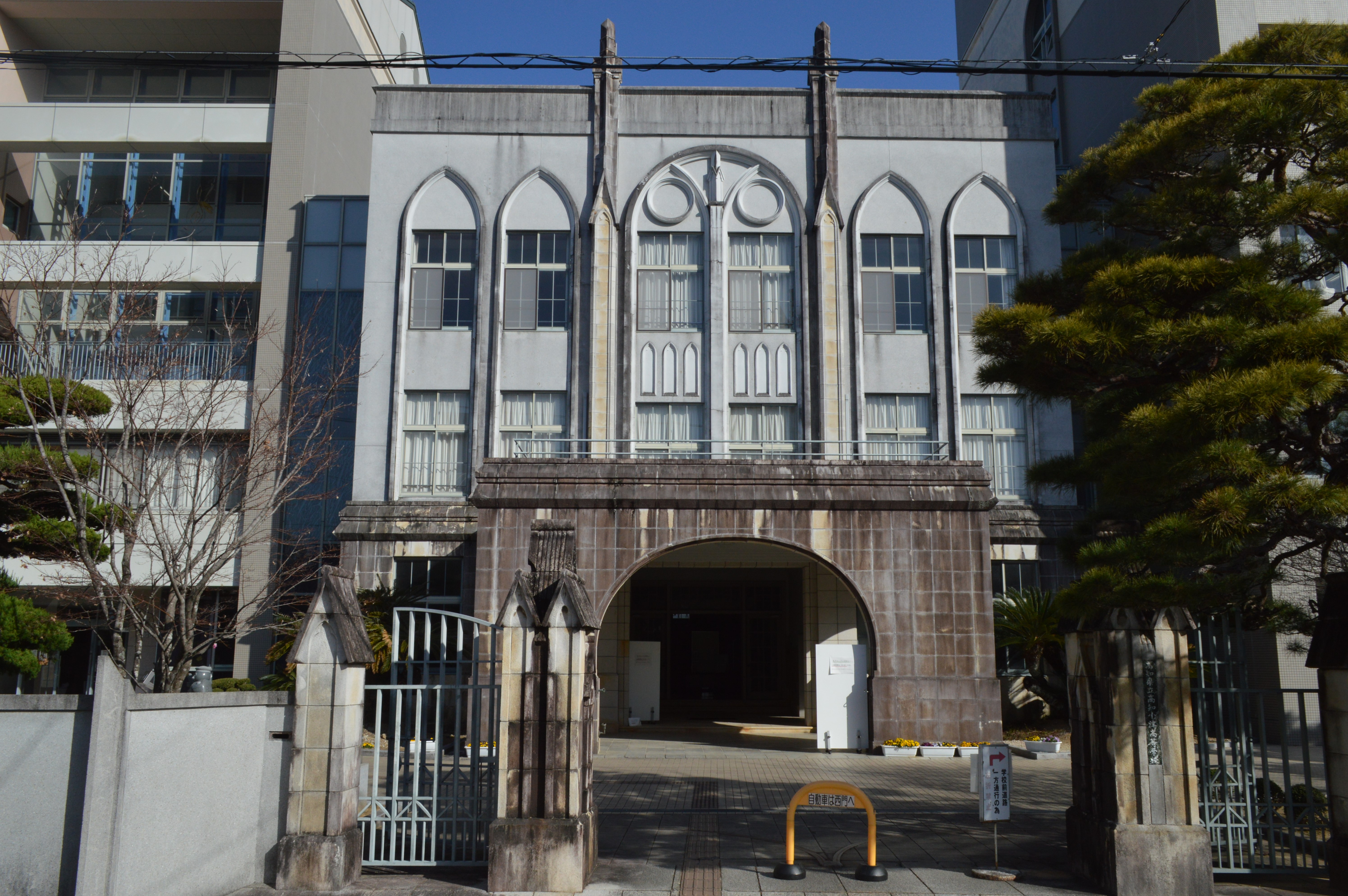
Kochi Ozu High School inspired the design of school setting

Revenge's set design is inspired by real locations in the Tokyo metro, especially near Mitaka, Musashino and Yokohama. The school's exterior was modeled on Kochi Ozu High School.

On April 2, 2022, a second season titled Masamune-kun's Revenge R was announced. The main staff and cast members are reprising their roles. It was initially scheduled for April 2023, but was later delayed to July due to the COVID-19 pandemic affecting the production, which aired from July 3 to September 18, 2023. The opening theme is "Please, please!" performed by Ayaka Ōhashi. Medialink licensed the series in South, Southeast Asia and Oceania (except Australia and New Zealand) and will stream it on Ani-One Asia's YouTube channel.

==== Episodes ====
===== Season 1 (2017) =====
No.	Title (Note: English translated titles are taken from Crunchyroll.)	Directed by	Written by	Storyboarded by	Original release date	Ref.
1	"The Boy Who Was Called Pig's Foot"; Transliteration: "Tonsoku to Yobareta Otoko" (Japanese: 豚足と呼ばれた男)	Keisuke Inoue	Michiko Yokote	Mirai Minato	January 5, 2017	
Masamune Makabe is introduced as a handsome guy who lives with his sister Chinatsu Hayase and his mother Kinue Hayase, but he is self-conscious about high-calorie foods. On his first day of high school, Masamune witnesses Shigeo Yamada being publicly humiliated and rejected by Aki Adagaki. Masamune quickly befriends classmates Tae Futaba and Kojūrō Shuri. When Aki finds classmate Akio Tanabe, she reads aloud his love letter and tears it up before rejecting him. Aki got the nickname "Cruel Princess" due to her family wealth and cruel methods of rejecting boys. Masamune recalls that Aki rejected him when they were childhood friends. Thanks to Kojūrō, Masamune collects information about Aki, rumored to always eat alone despite being surrounded by her female friends. Masasune follows Aki's maid Yoshino Koiwai to a storage closet, where he learns that Aki is prone to hypoglycemia and needs to eat in large quantities in order to satisfy her appetite. Aki promises that Masamune will regret it if he ever exposes her secret. During volleyball practice, Kojūrō says that there are rumors about Masamune and Aki being friends. After school, while Yoshino runs to the store to get some bread, Aki encounters an envious Akio, who attempts to cut Aki's hair. Masamune suddenly intercepts and causes Akio to run away. When Masamune was a chubby boy in the past, he visited Aki at her mansion, only for her to reject him and call him "Pig's Foot". Ever since then, he seeks revenge to win her heart before dumping her, calling it the "Dead or Love Plan". The next morning, after reconciling with Akio, Masamune finds an anonymous letter in his shoe locker with "Pig's Foot" written on it, fearing that someone might know about his past.
2	"Cinderella Doesn't Smile"; Transliteration: "Shinderera wa Warawanai" (Japanese: シンデレラは笑わない)	Michiru Itabisashi	Michiko Yokote	Mirai Minato	January 12, 2017	
Masamune becomes very cautious around his classmates. He was previously adopted by his grandfather and his last name was changed eight years ago. During the "lunchtime stampede" at the cafeteria, he reluctantly helps Yoshino buy five explosive croquette buns and four cutlet sandwiches. Accompanying Yoshino to the storage closet, Masamune meets a dead end with Aki when he tries to find out who wrote the anonymous letter. After Masamune receives a juice box from Yoshino without a smile, Aki states that Yoshino has a habit of serving others, though Yoshino is expected to always serve Aki. Before taking his leave, Masamune tells Aki that he wants to serve her, causing Aki to blush. After lunchtime, Masamune is caught in a snare trap surprisingly set up by Yoshino. She releases him and explains that the Koiwai family has been attendants to the Adagaki family for 300 years. Yoshino even offers to help Masamune execute his revenge plan. In the hallway on the way to class, Masamune runs into Tae, who invites him to an upcoming class barbecue. He attempts to exchange email addresses with her, but he chickens out and asks Kojūrō for advice. Tae learns that the school beautification committee lost a member, so Masamune volunteers to fill in the vacancy, but he is unable to get closer to Aki. In the classroom, Tae asks Masamune out on a movie date, but he kindly declines. When Tae leaves, Aki suddenly appears before Masamune. When Masamune attempts to exchange email addresses with Aki, she claims that her cellphone is being repaired. The following week, Masamune is sent on a wild-goose chase all over school set up by Aki, who frustrates him with a written rejection. Yoshino then tells Masamune that she will help him go on dates with Aki.
3	"Yoshino's Magic Show"; Transliteration: "Yoshino no Majikku Shō" (Japanese: 吉乃のマジックショー)	Yūshi Ibe	Kento Shimoyama	Keiichiro Kawaguchi	January 19, 2017	
Tae announces that all her classmates will need to attend supplementary classes for a month if any student fails the proficiency test. Masamune decides to tutor Kojūrō since he scored extremely low on his midterm exam. After Masamune sees Aki tutoring Yoshino nearby, Masasune and Aki each make a wager between who will score higher. Aki is surprised to learn from Yoshino that Masamune was the only student to get a perfect score on his transfer exam. Masamune receives a phone call from Yoshino, who says that she is unable to help him in the wager. Later on, Chinatsu and Kinue are shocked to see Masamune studying instead of working out. On the day of the proficiency test, Yoshino gives Masamune a black iced coffee from the vending machine while telling him that all his studying does not matter. He starts to have a stomachache at the beginning of the proficiency test, theorizing that Aki ordered Yoshino to lace the drink with laxatives. However, he finds out that Aki was absent from a fever, and his boxed lunch caused the stomachache. Masamune and Aki end up being the only students to attend the supplementary classes. Masamune later meets Aki at the train station for a date. He sees her cosplaying as a magical girl, as she believes this to be the "first date dress code". Masamune and Aki watch a horror movie in the theater with one empty seat between them. When they eat at a restaurant, a young girl asks Aki about her cosplay costume. After Masamune tells Aki that the first date dress code does not exist, Aki changes clothes in a dressing room. Masamune accidentally sees Aki in her undergarments, and she knocks him unconscious. Masamune reminisces about his first encounter with Aki at her mansion when they were children. When Masamune wakes up from Aki's lap at a park bench, she leaves after he apologizes for startling her. Yoshino contacts Masamune, saying that she agreed to help him with the revenge plan in efforts to make Aki humbler.
4	"Clear and Present Danger"; Transliteration: "Ima Soko ni aru Kiki" (Japanese: 今そこにある危機)	Keisuke Inoue	Kento Shimoyama	Keisuke Inoue	January 26, 2017	
Masamune reads a shōjo manga called "Rose-Eyed Steroid", featuring the characters Eiji and Momo, in order to gather ideas to execute his revenge plan. He stares at Aki during supplementary class and offers her an umbrella when it begins to rain outside. Yoshino later tells Masamune to stop being creepy towards Aki, advising him to back off a bit. Because of this, he starts to ignore Aki, even when she tries to return his umbrella. Aki soon stops Masamune in the hallway, consequently being flustered when trying to confront him as to why she is being ignored. He admits that he ignored her on purpose because he likes her, and he runs away after saying that he likes everything about her. In the schoolyard, Yoshino refuses to give Masamune advice. Masamune writes a love letter and gives it to Aki, but she throws it away right in front of him. Aki runs away after saying that Masamune is acting like a selfish jerk. While Yoshino assures Masamune that she will take care of the matter, Aki runs to a playground, where she recalls seeing Masamune and Yoshino together in the schoolyard. Yoshino finds Aki at the playground and clears up the misunderstanding by saying that Masamune just needed some advice, especially since Yoshino is aware that Aki likes Masamune back. Afterwards, Aki crosses an intersection while thinking about Masamune. When an oncoming car approaches Aki, Masamune rescues her from danger in the nick of time. A girl wearing a rosary comes out of the car and hugs Masamune, but he does not recognize her at all.
5	"Mysterious Cat"; Transliteration: "Misuteriasu Kyatto" (Japanese: ミステリアス・キャット)	Shinsuke Gomi	Michiko Yokote	Mirai Minato	February 2, 2017	
The girl believes her prayers were answered for having a chance meeting with Masamune. She is then told by her bodyguard Shidō that they are running late. Once they depart, Aki walks off in a huff after witnessing everything. The next day at school, Masamune buys food during the "lunchtime stampede", but he is then shot repeated by Yoshino with an air gun. Yoshino leaves after Masamune confesses that he does not know the girl. Masamune delivers the food outside the storage closet without meeting Aki. He is shocked to learn that the girl, recognized as Neko Fujinomiya, is a transfer student in his class. Masamune soon learns from Tae that Neko transferred into the school just because of him. Neko reveals that Masamune offered his coat to her during Christmas three years ago. However, he realizes that she was not referring to him because he was still chubby during that time. He grabs her by the hand and takes her outside, confronting her as to why she made up a lie, though she says that the truth is embarrassing. As Masamune admits having unrequited love for someone else, he takes Neko to see Aki in her class. When a boy opens the classroom window, Masamune and Aki discover that Neko mysteriously does not wear panties. Masamune tries to stop Aki when she leaves the classroom, but Aki accidentally punches a teacher in the face, causing Masamune and Aki to clean the swimming pool as punishment. Masamune sprays water from a hose on Aki, then Aki carries a bucket of water in order to get even. Aki trips and falls into the swimming pool and starts to drown, prompting Masamune to dive in and rescue her, though the swimming pool turns out to be rather shallow. Aki is surprised that Masamune saved her despite him avoiding to get wet. He admits that his body moved on its own, as well as the fact that he likes her, so she asks him to prove it by kissing her.
6	"Attack! Battle of the Home Visits"; Transliteration: "Totsugeki! Otaku Hōmon-sen" (Japanese: 突撃！お宅訪問戦)	Michiru Itabisashi	Michiko Yokote	Keiichiro Kawaguchi	February 9, 2017	
In the schoolyard, Neko asks Yoshino where Masamune and Aki have been, but Yoshino says that she has no idea. At the swimming pool, Aki backs out before a hesitant Masamune tries to kiss her. When the swim team including Tae arrive for swimming practice, Aki leaves Masamune in the swimming pool. Masamune dries off in the schoolyard, where Neko sits beside him and offers hot tea filled with hydrating vitamins and minerals. He asks her about what she likes about him, and she answers that he is amazingly modest, a response that was unexpected of him. Yoshino follows Neko all the way towards Masamune's home. When Yoshino is noticed by Shidō, Neko tells Shidō that Yoshino is an attendant for Aki. Masamune arrives home, only to find out that Kinue "recruited" Yoshino and Neko to assist in making fried shrimp in the kitchen. Yoshino notices all the gym equipment that Masamune has in his bedroom. When Neko finds the two, she says that Chinatsu just came home and the fried shrimp is ready. At the dining table, Masamune prevents Chinatsu from revealing his past. Masamune complains about the high calories and Neko complains about the low nutrients, much to Kinue's worry. After eating, Chinatsu lights up fireworks. Yoshino tells Masamune about a time when Aki attached her to a bunch of fireworks in order to simulate a rocket launch, though Yoshino was blind and deaf for a week. Neko then tells Masamune that she admires Chinatsu, despite Masamune finding Chinatsu annoying. Kinue and Chinatsu also have a watermelon seed spitting contest. While Shidō drives Neko to her house, Masamune walks Yoshino to the main road, as Yoshino tells Masamune to avoid falling in love with Aki. It is revealed that Neko has stolen a childhood photo of Masamune and Aki. The next day in the storage closet, Masamune tells Aki that she is amazingly modest, but she says that he is too conceited to accept being a moron.
7	"The Tsunade Island Incident"; Transliteration: "Tsunade-jima Jiken" (Japanese: 綱手島事件)	Yūshi Ibe	Kento Shimoyama	Masafumi Tamura	February 16, 2017	
As summer vacation finally begins, Masamune plans his next move to get closer to Aki, convincing her to invite him to her summer villa in Tsunade Island, along with Neko, Tae and Kojūrō. On the yacht, Yoshino informs Masamune that her research on Neko came up short. Yoshino threatens Masamune that she will reveal the whole story up to this moment if he does not make Aki fall in love with him by the end of the trip. At Tsunade Island, Adagaki family secretary Midori Yuisaki welcomes Masamune, Aki, Yoshino, Neko, Tae and Kojūrō to the summer villa. Masamune riskily declares that he is dating Aki, somehow convincing Yuisaki. Aki is reluctant to pretend dating Masamune for the duration of the trip. At the beach, Neko gets extra close with Masamune when she wants him to apply sunscreen on her. Aki comes in between them and advises Neko to back off from her cheap flirting tricks. When Aki takes Masamune to an isolated area of the beach, she orders him to bring her back some lunch. While Masamune fetches a boxed lunch from Yuisaki in the kitchen, Yuisaki suggests for Masamune to visit a haunted mansion, though Yuisaki secretly expresses envy towards Masamune for dating Aki. In the past, Yuisaki witnessed a young Aki rejecting all the boys after she was abandoned by the chubby Masamune. In the present, Masamune, Aki, Yoshino, Neko, Tae and Kojūrō enter the haunted mansion at night one by one. Yuisaki originally plans to cosplay as Ghostface in order to scare Masamune. However, Yoshino cosplays as Jason Voorhees and scares Yuisaki, who runs away and ends up scaring Aki, Tae and Kojūrō in the process. Yuisaki flees outside and encounters a spooky Neko, causing Yuisaki to run into a pole. While Masamune later carries Yuisaki on his back, he confides in her that he is not dating Aki. The next morning on the yacht, Yoshino respects Masamune for his risky strategy. Yoshino says that she will not say anything to Aki, but Yoshino states that she will not help Masamune if he cannot help himself.
8	"It's Not You"; Transliteration: "Kimi ja nai nda" (Japanese: 君じゃないんだ)	Keisuke Inoue	Kento Shimoyama	Mirai Minato	February 23, 2017	
Masamune is contacted by Aki during his workout routine. He then tells Yoshino that Aki wants to meet in person in order to return a bag that he left at the summer villa. In his bedroom, Masamune realizes that the childhood photo of him and Aki has disappeared, certain that Neko stole it. Aki returns the bag to Masamune at a diner, though Masamune is bent on Neko stealing his childhood photo. Aki leaves after Masamune ignores her. Neko contacts Masamune and invites him to a water park with Tae. Masamune visits Neko in the afternoon at her apartment, where Neko makes hot tea. He snoops around her bedroom, filled with various pills and shōjo manga, but she eventually finds him. After she admits that she became interested in "Rose-Eyed Steroid" because of him, she comes clean with Masamune's childhood photo. Neko kisses Masamune unexpectedly, saying that health is more important than looks. As Masamune contemplates that appearance is only one aspect of a person, he reveals that he had a snobbish attitude when he was chubby. Before taking his childhood photo with him, Masamune tells Neko that he cannot be with her, adding that his heart belongs to Aki. The next morning, a groggy Masamune meets with Aki, Yoshino, Tae and Kojūrō at the water park, though Neko decided to cancel on them. Later on, Shidō rushes to inform the others that Neko has run away from the apartment since the morning. To make matters worse, the pills that Neko are actually anticonvulsants, and she puts on a cheerful facade to mask her fragile condition. Since Shidō is aware that Masamune previously visited Neko's apartment, Masamune confesses that he rejected Neko and chose Aki.
9	"It's Been Called Love and Affection"; Transliteration: "Ai tomo Koi tomo Iu Keredo" (Japanese: 愛とも恋ともいうけれど)	Ken Takahashi	Kento Shimoyama	Ken Takahashi	March 2, 2017	
As Aki ignores Masamune's confession, Shidō informs everyone that Neko left her cellphone and wallet at the apartment. Leaving Masamune behind outside the water park, Shidō drives Aki, Yoshino, Tae and Kojūrō, as they split up around town in search of Neko. Masamune and Aki end up together at the school, where Aki empathizes Masamune for rejecting Neko yet pities Neko for wallowing in misery. Masamune asks Aki if she knows about the nickname "Pig's Foot", but many love letters in the form of paper planes appear in the sky, leading them to find Neko on the school rooftop. Neko collapses in Masamune's arms, and she is sent to the hospital. Masamune contemplates if rejecting Neko was worth it, and he then visits her in the hospital room, where she starts talking about the past. It is shown that Neko was invited to a birthday party by three girls, but her condition was brought up when they mentioned tennis. Neko's grandfather suggested for her to undergo surgery, even though her condition would not be cured. She wanted the chance of falling in love, and she decided to pursue Masamune. Neko enjoys the chase of falling in love, noting that she and Masamune are very much alike. Aside from experiencing unrequited love for herself, she is satisfied that Masamune will not follow the same path. In the hospital lobby, Tae tells Yoshino and Kojūrō that she had feelings for Masamune, though she is glad to have friends. When Masamune comes back to the hospital lobby, he walks past Aki on his way out. While heading home, Masamune worries that he will end up on the same path of unrequited love, though he is still determined to execute his revenge plan. Outside her mansion, Aki recalls her conversation with Neko in the hospital room, in which Neko questioned Aki about her persistence of doubting Masamune's love. Aki believes that Masamune was very attractive when he was chubby. Masamune packs a duffel bag and leaves Chinatsu and Kinue. Aki is approached by a boy who resembles a chubby Masamune.
10	"The New School Term Filled With Doubts"; Transliteration: "Giwaku no Shin-gakki" (Japanese: 疑惑の新学期)	Shinsuke Gomi	Michiko Yokote	Shinsuke Gomi	March 9, 2017	
Yoshino's father is shocked to learn from a letter that the boy, introduced as Kanetsugu Gasō, is betrothed to Aki. As summer vacation ends, Aki rejects the head player of the varsity baseball team outside school. Despite this, Tae, Sonoka Kaneko and Mari Mizuno are shocked to see that Aki has gone soft around Kanetsugu when the two head off to class. Masamune is surprised that Neko has returned to school after recovering from her surgery in the past month, while Neko realizes that Masamune did not make any progress with his revenge plan. When Masamune goes to see Aki after class, he is surprised to see that Kanetsugu is not only a transfer student in her class, but also is engaged to her. Yoshino takes Masamune to the storage closet, where she confirms that Aki and Kanetsugu are living together at the mansion. Masamune observes that Kanetsugu is an exceptional soccer player, is very academically smart and is inclined to sit next to Aki during lunchtime. After school, Tae, Sonoka and Mari meet up at a fast-food restaurant in order to discuss how Aki has changed. The next day at school, Tae proposes a play for the Yasaka Festival, in which Kojūrō and Masamune will star as Snow White and Prince Charming. After class, Masamune corners Aki against a wall in the hallway, but he is bereft of words, causing Aki to walk back to Kanetsugu. Tae, Sonoka and Mari intend to protect Aki from Masamune as the three recall the conversation with Kanetsugu at the fast-food restaurant, revealing that Kanetsugu does not plan to kiss Aki even though he is engaged to her. Sonoka uses her status as the student council vice president in order to deny approval for the proposal of Class 2-B to produce the play. Tae and Masamune learn that Class 2-A had the same proposal for Aki and Kanetsugu. To solve this issue, Masamune suggests a promotional competition for a poll between both plays. Masamune also wagers with Kanetsugu, in which the winner gets to dance with Aki at the after-party.
11	"Snow White of the Yasaka Festival"; Transliteration: "Yasaka-sai no Shirayuki Hime" (Japanese: 八坂祭の白雪姫)	Yūshi Ibe	Kento Shimoyama	Keiichiro Kawaguchi	March 16, 2017	
Tae acts sternly towards Kojūrō during a stage rehearsal of the play in the school gymnasium. Kojūrō runs out in the hallway and encounters Neko, who is on her way to the school gymnasium carrying her costume. Kanetsugu approaches Masamune in the schoolyard, boasting that he gives Aki some chocolates during breaks. While Aki and Kanetsugu walk towards the food trucks after school, Kanetsugu reminisces that his poor parents wanted him to marry a rich girl. Masamune gets sick at home after exercising in his underwear, prompting Chinatsu to summon Kinue, who wraps Masamune in blankets. On the day of the Yasaka Festival, Sonoka hosts the promotional competition for the plays. Neko takes Masamune to the school infirmary, where she instinctively knows that he was sick and tucks him in the bed. She leaves after saying that she would not mind being his dance partner at the after-party. With an hour before the performance, Kojūrō finds Neko at the food stalls. In the school gymnasium, they inform Tae that Masamune has gone missing. Meanwhile, a skilled kendo practitioner named Kikune Kiba has captured Masamune in a closet and wrapped him in blankets. Mari orders Kikune to keep Masamune hostage until Aki and Kanetsugu finish dancing at the after-party. Aki finds out that Kanetsugu also has gone missing. Yoshino previously disguised herself as the Evil Queen and locked Kanetsugu in another closet. Kikune became a bodyguard for Aki since a year ago after the latter rejected a cheating kendo practitioner named Masaru Tawarada. Kikune releases Masamune after he accuses her of being unfair. Masamune confidently waits for his friends to rescue him after realizing from Mari that Kanetsugu is also taken hostage. Aki tells Mari that the show must go on without Kanetsugu. After receiving a message from Mari saying to leave Masamune and find Kanetsugu, a furious Kikune chases Masamune out the window, but she falls into the fountain below while he hangs onto the ledge. Tae and Kojūrō tell Masamune that Aki is still performing without Kanetsugu, prompting Masamune to run back inside.
12	"Don't Let Go of the Mic, Even if You Die"; Transliteration: "Shindemo Maiku o Tebanasu na" (Japanese: 死んでもマイクを手放すな)	Keisuke Inoue	Michiko Yokote	Mirai Minato	March 23, 2017	
Masamune runs to the school gymnasium, where he is in awe that Class 2-A began their play without Kanetsugu. To prevent Aki from humiliating herself as Snow White, Masamune ignores Mari's objections and volunteers to be Prince Charming, thanks to Neko. During the scene where Snow White ate the poisoned apple and dies in a coffin with the Seven Dwarfs tearfully surrounding her, Prince Charming appears on stage. Despite being stricken with a fever, Masamune pushes through and manages to kiss Aki, but she punches him in embarrassment as the play comes to a close. During the after-party, students of Class 2-A and Class 2-B eventually decide to have a karaoke battle as a tie-breaker for the competition. Tae, Aki, Neko and Yoshino each select songs, singing with mics and scoring pretty high. However, Sonoka and Kikune catch on to Masamune, as he tries to escape from the karaoke battle. Aki and Neko even perform a duet together. When it is Masamune's turn to sing, he ends up scoring the lowest despite burning fifteen calories. Afterwards, Masamune and Aki sit on a park bench while waiting for Yoshino to come back from shopping. Masamune and Aki discuss how he stepped in during her play. He asks her to kiss him, but he ends up being fed a sweet baked potato just when Yoshino returns. When Aki and Yoshino leave, Masamune plots to execute his revenge plan during a class trip to Paris.
OVA	"Of Course, My Mom..."; Transliteration: "Uchi no Mama ni Kagitte" (Japanese: うちのママにかぎって)	Shin Oonuma	Michiko Yokote	Mirai Minato	July 27, 2018	N/A
OVA	"Tsunade Island, Once More."; Transliteration: "Tsunade shima, futatabi." (Japanese: 綱手島、ふたたび。)	Shin Oonuma	Michiko Yokote	Mirai Minato	July 27, 2018	N/A
OVA	"Cinderella After Twelve"; Transliteration: "12-Ji o sugita Shinderera" (Japanese: 12時を過ぎたシンデレラ)	Shin Oonuma	Michiko Yokote	Mirai Minato	July 27, 2018	N/A
Masamune walks in the shopping district, describing himself as the perfect man. He returns home, learning that his cousin Haruka and his aunt Asae look exactly like his mom Kinue. Chinatsu convinces Kinue, Haruka and Asae to wear matching outfits and takes several pictures of them. While Haruka confesses that she wanted to marry Masamune, he claims that somebody already has his heart, though she still offers to be next in line. Aki, Yoshino, Neko, Tae and Kojūrō travel by yacht and visit Aki's summer villa at Tsunade Island. Yuisaki nosily asks Aki if she was dumped by Masamune, and Aki confirms that Masamune only gave himself more attention. This is shown when Masamune smacks into a street lamp while admiring himself in the shopping district. After a day at the beach, the girls gather together to talk about relationships, but they end up studying for the entrance exams. A drunk Yuisaki carries Kojūrō under her arm, while spurring up a conversation about loving attractive guys. As everyone else falls asleep, Aki calls Masamune at night, and she confirms to him that she is lonely. At the mansion, Yoshino is advised by her sister Shigeno Koiwai to have the day off. Shigeno gives Yoshino a haircut and a manicure before sending her outside in formal attire. As spectators turn heads, Yoshino contemplates that she always wore flat shoes and comfortable clothes which allowed her to be at Aki's beck and call. She enjoys a dessert served by a waiter and receives a balloon given by a bear mascot. Yoshino sees a boy and a girl who resemble Masamune and Aki as children, and after the boy accidentally drops his ice cream onto her dress, Yoshino gives up her balloon to the boy as a sign of forgiveness. She changes into causal attire in a dressing room, and she is glad to roam freely without getting attention. Returning to the mansion, Yoshino tells Shigeno that she wants to become prettier on her own, though she jokes about planning to dump the guy who falls in love with her.

===== Season 2: R (2023) =====
No.	Title	Directed by (Note: Information is taken from the ending credits of each episode.)	Written by	Storyboarded by	Original release date	Ref.
1	"The Wee Parisian Mademoiselle"; Transliteration: "Pari to Oga Tsuku Madomoazeru" (Japanese: 巴里とオがつくマドモアゼル)	Mirai Minato, Satoru Kakutani	Michiko Yokote	Mirai Minato	July 3, 2023	
2	"The Princess's Confession"; Transliteration: "Purinsesu no Kokuhaku" (Japanese: プリンセスの告白)	Takahiro Nakatsugawa	Michiko Yokote	Hiromitsu Kanazawa	July 10, 2023	
3	"They Show Up When You Least Expect It"; Transliteration: "Wasureta Koro ni Yattekuru" (Japanese: 忘れたころにやってくる)	Yamato Ouchi	Michiko Yokote	Yamato Ouchi	July 17, 2023	
4	"I'm Not Going to Fall in Love with You, Pig's Foot"; Transliteration: "Anta Nanka Suki ni Naranai wa Yo, Tonsoku" (Japanese: あんたなんか好きにならないわよ、豚足)	Takahiro Nakatsugawa	Kento Shimoyama	Takahiro Nakatsugawa	July 24, 2023	
5	"So We Became a Couple"; Transliteration: "Kare to, Kanojo ni Narimashite" (Japanese: 彼と、彼女になりまして)	Mirai Minato	Kento Shimoyama	Miyana Okita	July 31, 2023	
6	"The Second Date"; Transliteration: "Nidome no Dēto" (Japanese: 二度目のデート)	Yūsuke Onoda	Misaki Morie	Hiromitsu Kanazawa	August 7, 2023	
7	"There's No Point in This Confession"; Transliteration: "Yūte mo Sennaki Kokuhaku desu ga" (Japanese: 言うても詮無き告白ですが)	Misuzu Hoshino	Kento Shimoyama	Koji Sawai	August 14, 2023	
8	"There Are Things You Shouldn't Realize"; Transliteration: "Kizuichaikenai Koto mo Aru" (Japanese: 気づいちゃいけないこともある)	Yamato Ouchi	Kento Shimoyama	Yuuichi Nihei	August 21, 2023	
9	"Saint Valentine Is Watching"; Transliteration: "Kiyoshi Barentain ga Miteiru" (Japanese: 聖バレンタインが見ている)	Takahiro Nakatsugawa	Misaki Morie	Miyana Okita	August 28, 2023	
10	"Whiteout"; Transliteration: "Howaitoauto" (Japanese: ホワイトアウト)	Misuzu Hoshino	Misaki Morie	Hiromitsu Kanazawa	September 4, 2023	
11	"Face Your Feelings"; Transliteration: "Jibun no Kimochi ni Mukiatte" (Japanese: 自分の気持ちに向き合って)	Mirai Minato	Michiko Yokote	Mirai Minato	September 11, 2023	
12	"Dead or Love?"	Mirai Minato	Michiko Yokote	Mirai Minato	September 18, 2023	

== Reception ==
Reviewing the first volume, Rebecca Silverman of Anime News Network stated that the combination of revenge comedy and romance was "working thus far". She felt that Aki's servant was the most interesting character, but also enjoyed Masamune, especially how he had to "think about the correct response for each situation he finds himself in". She called Aki "utterly detestable", and noted that it would be difficult for the series to turn around and make her a romantic interest. She wrote that the art was attractive, but noted that the drawings of women were often anatomically incorrect.

The anime adaptation's first episode received poor reviews from Anime News Network's staff during the Winter 2017 season previews. Theron Martin enjoyed the series the most, stating that with the clichés he should have hated the first episode, but instead he found it quite entertaining. Other staffers weren't so positive. Nick Creamer called it a "fairly generic romcom premiere starring a very repugnant cast", while Bamboo Dong claimed it was "a plain piece of toast smeared with unresolved childhood memories of rejection" and complained about how males are portrayed as hapless victims of the heartless women. Jacob Chapman called the comedy "dehumanizing" and the episode was not engaging. Paul Jensen was more positive in that he found the story and characters were unusual enough to be interesting, but he had mixed feelings as he was not sure what the series wanted to be. Silverman states that the episode walks a fine line between comedy and cruelty and her strong dislike of Aki is definitely coloring this episode for her.

ANN editor Lauren Orsini chose Masamune-kun's Revenge as her pick for the Worst Anime of 2017, criticizing its "excessive cruelty" being delivered by the two main leads and the rest of the cast, concluding that, "This anime should only be viewed as an example of how not to win friends and influence people. The best revenge is a life well lived, as in, not Masamune's approach".

== See also ==
- Chasing After Aoi Koshiba, another manga series written by Hazuki Takeoka
