= Masamune Atsuo =

- Born: November 15, 1881; Okayama, Japan
- Died: November 12, 1958 (aged 76)
- Occupations: Researcher of Japanese literature, poet
- Relatives: brother: Hakuchō Masamune(poet), Genkei Masamune(Botanist), Tokuzaburo Masamune(painter)

Masamune Atsuo (正宗 敦夫; November 15, 1881 – November 12, 1958) was a researcher of Japanese literature and a poet.

== Biography ==
Masamune Atsuo was born in Wake District Honami (present-day Bizen), Okayama Prefecture, he was the younger brother of novelist and literary critic Masamune Hakuchō. While his brother moved to Tokyo to work, Atsuo remained home and ran the family business. He studied waka under the guidance of Inoue Michiyasu, and was friends with Shimaki Akahiko and Saitō Mokichi. In addition to work, he wrote waka and researched Japanese literature. Due to his achievements, in 1952 he became a professor at Notre Dame Seishin University in Okayama.

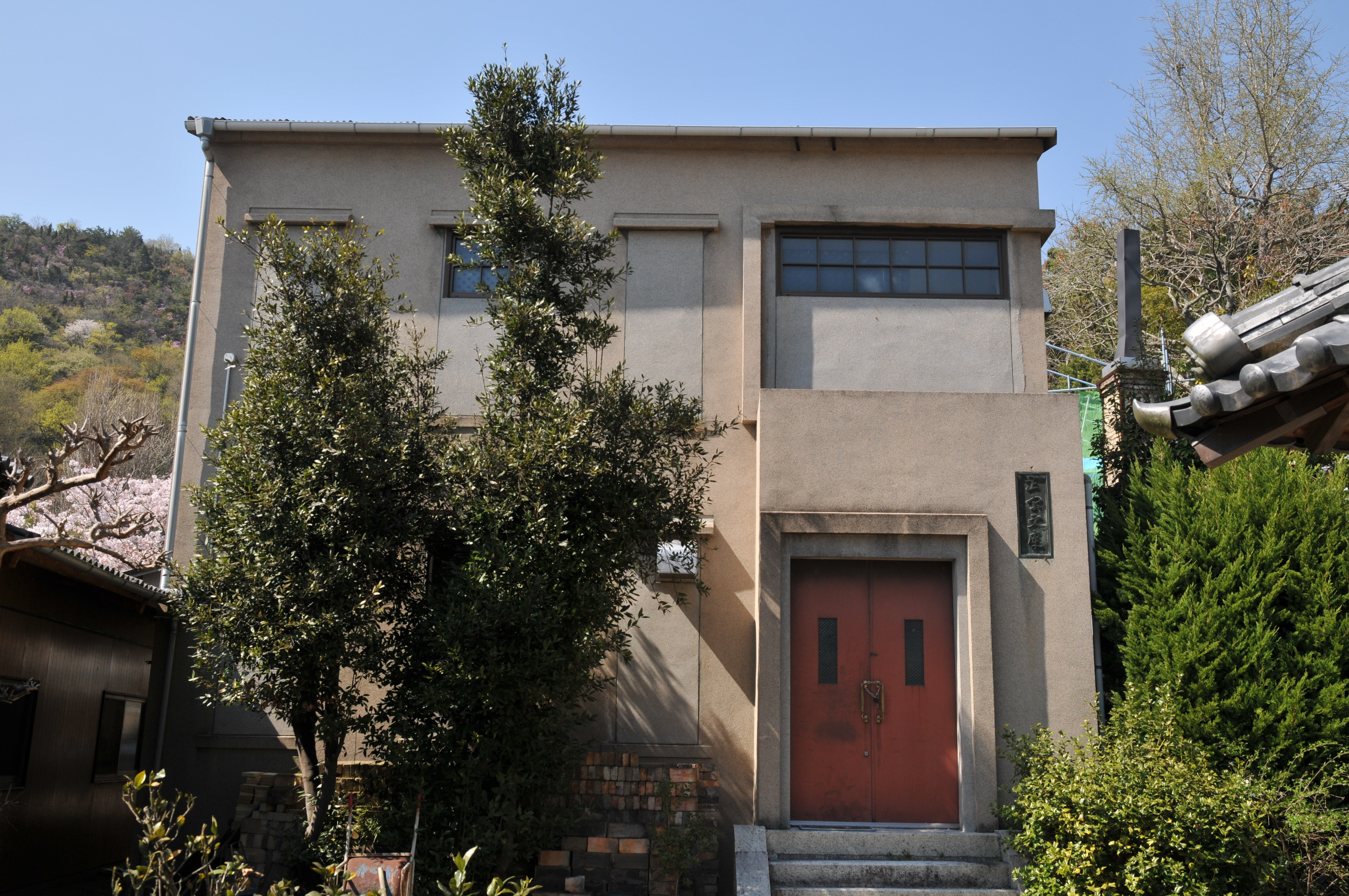
The Masamune Library in Bizen, Okayama

He collected old and rare books, and in 1936 established the Masamune Collection (正宗文庫). This collection is still in existence and contains many valuable texts.
