= Noriaki Fukuyama =

Japanese botanist and orchidologist (1912–1946)

- 福山伯明
- Born: 1912
- Died: 1946 (aged 33–34); Taiwan
- Cause of death: Murder
- Education: Taihoku Imperial University
- Known for: Study of South East Asian Orchids
- Scientific career
- Fields: Botany
- Workplaces: Taihoku High School
- Academic advisors: Genkei Masamune

Noriaki Fukuyama (福山 伯明, Fukuyama Noriaki; 1912 – 1946) was a Japanese botanist and orchidologist. He died in Taiwan.

During his short life, Fukuyama described over a hundred new species of orchids from Micronesia, the Ryukyus and Taiwan. Most of the type specimens he collected were housed in his personal herbarium (Herb. Orch. Fuk.), located in Taiwan, and were previously believed to have been lost amid the upheaval in Japan following the close of World War II. However, most of Fukuyama's type materials of Taiwan orchids were rediscovered, in the course of sifting through the botanical collection of one Genkei Masamune, which Masamune had bequeathed to the herbarium of the Kanagawa Prefectural Museum of Natural History upon his death in 1993. Although it is not entirely clear as to why he had them, it is known that Fukuyama had been Masamune's pupil.

Among the materials found were Fukuyama's original manuscripts of Studia Orchidacearum Japonicarum, Vols. XI thru XIII.

Suffering from cancer, and plagued by local unrest in Taiwan against the Japanese, he was killed by locals in a nearby village during a local uprising against Japanese citizens living in Taiwan.
