= Jisaburo Ohwi =

Japanese botanist (1905–1977)

Jisaburo Ohwi (大井 次三郎, Ōi Jisaburō; 18 September 1905 – 22 February 1977) was a Japanese botanist. He was a distinguished member of the Faculty of Science of Kyoto Imperial University. He is perhaps best known for his 1953 Flora of Japan (日本植物誌, Nihon Shokubutsushi).

== Species named after Ohwi ==
- (Cyperaceae) Carex ohwii Masam.
- (Cyperaceae) Cyperus ohwii Kük.
- (Lamiaceae) Clerodendrum ohwii Kaneh. & Hatus.
- (Lamiaceae) Isodon × ohwii Okuyama
- (Lamiaceae) Rabdosia × ohwii (Okuyama), Hara
- (Melastomataceae) Medinilla ohwii Nayar.
- (Orchidaceae) Epipactis ohwii Fukuy.
- (Orchidaceae) Lecanorchis ohwii Masam.
- (Orchidaceae) Oreorchis ohwii Fukuy.
- (Poaceae) Panicum ohwii
- (Poaceae) Sasa ohwii Koidz.
- (Rosaceae) Prunus ohwii Kaneh. & Hatus.
- (Ruscaceae) Ophiopogon ohwii Okuyama
- (Saxifragaceae) Saxifraga ohwii Tatew.
