= Genkei Masamune =

Japanese botanist (1899–1993)

- Born: April 22, 1899; Okayama, Japan
- Died: June 18, 1993 (aged 94)
- Occupation: Botanist
- Relatives: Hakuchō Masamune; Atsuso Masamune; Tokuzaburo Masamune (brothers)
- Scientific career
- Author abbrev. (botany): Masam.

Genkei Masamune (正宗 厳敬, Masamune Genkei; 1899–1993) was a Japanese botanist.

== Biography ==
Masamune Genkei worked on the island of Formosa and then, after World War II, at Kanazawa University. He was noted for his comprehensive botanical indexes of Borneo and Taiwan, as well as for the identification of large numbers of new species.

== Selected publications ==
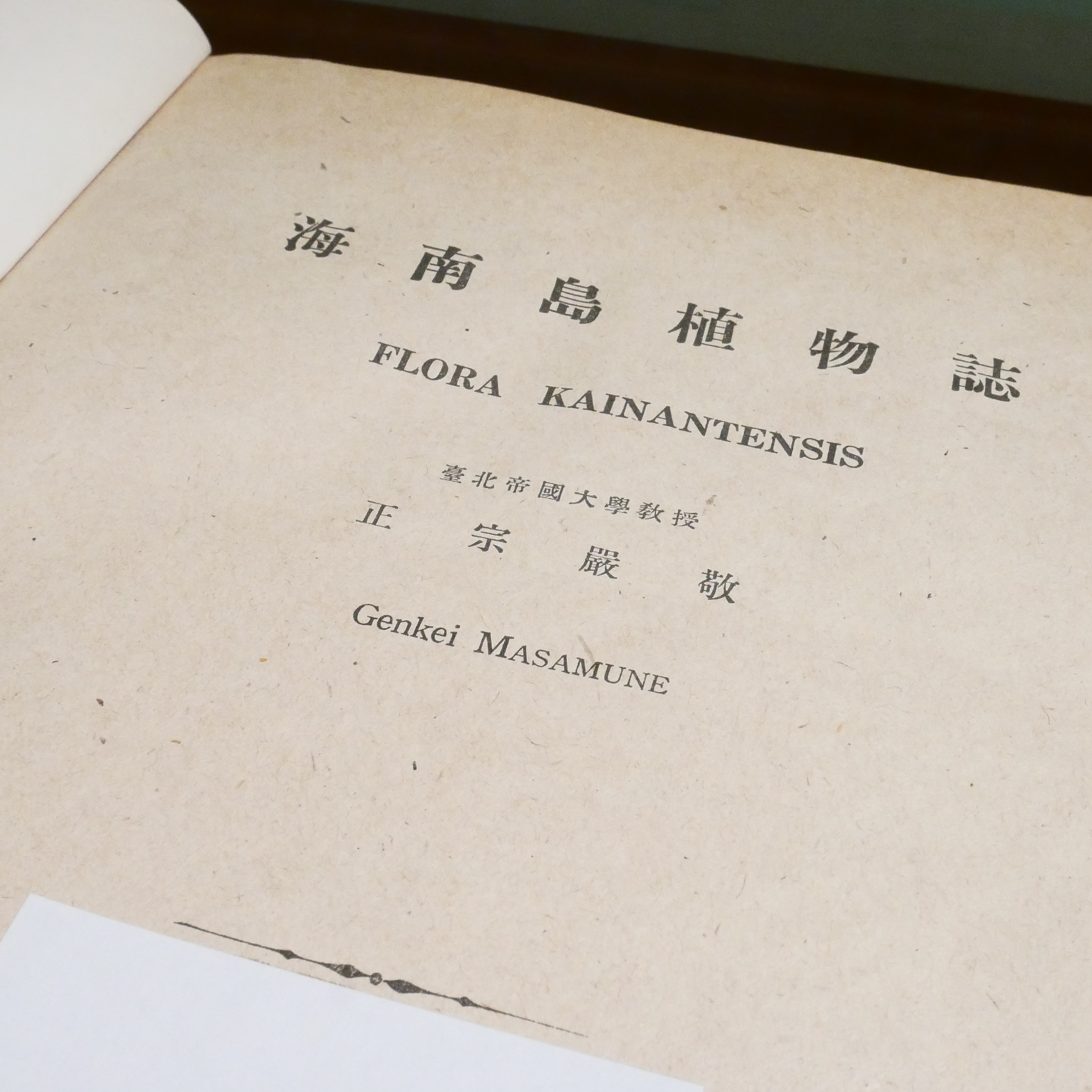
Flora Kainantensis

- (1954) Flora Kainantensis: A List of Vascular Plants of Taiwan Plant Taxonomic Laboratory, Faculty of Sciences, Taipei National University, Taipei, Taiwan;
- (1945) Boruneo no shokubutsu hoi. Enumeratio pteridophytarum Bornearum Taihoku Imperial University, Taihoku, Formosa;
- (1942) Boruneo no kenka shokubutsu. Enumeratio phanerogamarum Bornearum Taihoku Imperial University, Taihoku, Formosa;
- (1936) with Fukuyama, Noriaki Short flora of Formosa; or, An enumeration of higher cryptogamic and phanerogamic plants hitherto known from the island of Formosa and its adjacent islands "Kudoa", Taihoku, Formosa;
- (1933) Phytogeographical position of Japan concerning indigenous genera of vascular cryptogamic plants Taihoku Imperial University, Taihoku, Formosa;
- (1932) Contribution to our knowledge of the flora of the southern part of Japan Taihoku Imperial University, Formosa;
