= Dengeki hp Tanpenshōsetsu Shō =

Japanese literature award

The Dengeki hp Tanpenshōsetsu Shō (電撃hp短編小説賞) was an award handed out annually between 2000 and 2006 by the Japanese publisher MediaWorks for exceptionally written short stories and novellas. The prize was associated with MediaWorks' now-defunct light novel magazine Dengeki hp. Between the first and fourth contests held, the editorial department of MediaWorks' included the narrowed-down novellas in an issue of Dengeki hp, and the winner was decided from a reader-participation voting poll. This was changed with the fifth though seven contests by the use of a committee to award the prize.

== Committee members ==
- Mamizu Arisawa: Novelist of the Inukami! series
- Gakuto Coda: Novelist of the Missing series
- Yukako Kabei: Novelist, and winner of the ninth Dengeki Novel Prize
- Naoko Koyama: Editor-in-chief of Dengeki hp
- Masami Okayu: Novelist of the Bludgeoning Angel Dokuro-Chan series

== Prize winners ==
=== First prize (2000) ===
Grand prize
Post Girl, Jirō Masuko

=== Second prize (2001) ===
Grand prize
Under Rug Locking, Itsuki Nase
Honorable mention
Sakura in Pale Rose Bump, Takehiro Ariwara
Bludgeoning Angel Dokuro-Chan, Masami Okayu

=== Third prize (2002) ===
Grand prize
Shinjitsu no Kagami: Ofuda to Neko to Shōjo, Tenjō Hihiki
Honorable mention
Maisō Wakusei TheFuneralPlanet, Chiaki Yamashina

=== Fourth prize (2003) ===
Grand prize
Shiawase Nisei Taidōkyo Keikaku: Yōsei-san no Ohanashi, Yūsaku Igarashi
Honorable mention
Kare to Kanojo to Shōkan Mahō, Tsukasa Kōzuki
Saigo no Natsu ni Miageta Sora wa, Yu Sumimoto

=== Fifth prize (2004) ===
Grand prize
Inside World: Fuyu no Rocket, Tsukasa Suo
Gold prize
Unmei no Ito, Rakuda Mitsuki
Silver prize
Nisenyonhyakukyūkai no Kanojō, Yu Nishimura

=== Sixth prize (2005) ===
Grand prize
Unawarded
Gold prize
Mizumi no Kazoku, Shō Arisawa
Silver prize
Kaze no Sabaku, Kaze no Tō, Akito Mizawa
Choko to Hanabira, Yūei Miki

=== Seventh prize (2006) ===
Grand prize
Dramatic Ivory, Shōgo Ogawa
Reverse Kiss, Shinano Sano
