= List of Haruka Nogizaka's Secret episodes =

Haruka Nogizaka's Secret Japanese DVD Limited edition volume 1 cover

The Haruka Nogizaka's Secret animated television series is based on the light novel series of the same name written by Yūsaku Igarashi and illustrated by Shaa. The episodes, produced by Studio Barcelona, are directed by Munenori Nawa, written by Tsuyoshi Tamai, and features character design by Satoshi Ishino who based the designs on Shaa's original concept. A pre-broadcast aired on July 3, 2008, and 12 episodes were produced which aired in Japan between July 10 and September 25, 2008, on Chiba TV and TV Kanagawa. Six DVD compilation volumes were released by Geneon Entertainment between September 26, 2008, and February 27, 2009. A Blu-ray Disc box set of the series was released in Japan on September 26, 2009.

A second anime series entitled Haruka Nogizaka's Secret: Purezza (乃木坂春香の秘密 ぴゅあれっつぁ♪) was directed by Munenori Nawa and produced by Studio Barcelona under the name Diomedea. The second season aired in Japan between October 6 and December 22, 2009, and contains 12 episodes. A four-episode original video animation series titled Haruka Nogizaka's Secret: Finale was broadcast on AT-X and Tokyo MX between August 17 and November 25, 2012. The four BD/DVD volumes were published between August 29 and November 28, 2012.

Two pieces of theme music are used for the episodes of both seasons; one opening theme and one ending theme each. The first season's opening theme is "Tomadoi Bitter Tune" (とまどいビターチューン) by Milan Himemiya and Chocolate Rockers. The ending theme is "Hitosashiyubi Quiet!" (ひとさしゆびクワイエット!) by Kana Ueda, Mai Goto, Rina Satou, Kaori Shimizu and Mamiko Noto, the various voice actresses for the main characters of the anime. The second season's opening theme is "Chōhatsu Cherry Heart" (挑発 Cherry Heart) by Milan Himemiya and Chocolate Rockers. The ending theme is "Himitsu Suishō! Uru to Love" (秘密推奨！うるとLOVE) by Kana Ueda, Mai Goto, Rina Satō, Kaori Shimizu and Mamiko Noto.

== Haruka Nogizaka's Secret ==
No.	Title	Original release date
0	"Haruka Nogizaka's Secret's Secret"; Transliteration: "Nogizaka Haruka no Himitsu no Himitsu" (Japanese: 乃木坂春香の秘密のひみつ)	July 3, 2008
A preview for the anime series hosted by Kana Ueda and Mai Goto who voice the characters Nanami Nanashiro and Mika Nogizaka, respectively. The story from the series is profiled along with an introduction to the main characters and the voice actors who voice them.
1	"It's All Over..."; Transliteration: "Mō, Dame desu..." (Japanese: もう, ダメです...)	July 10, 2008
Yūto Ayase is a second-year student at Private High School, Hakujō Academy. One day he goes to the library to return a magazine for his bishōnen friend, Nobunaga Asakura. There, he bumps into the most popular girl in school, Haruka Nogizaka, and discovers her secret: that she is an otaku, which greatly distresses her. Haruka starts avoiding Yūto which causes his schoolmates to suspect that Yūto 'did something to her'. Eventually, Yūto finds Haruka on the school roof where he vows he will not tell anyone about her interest if she does not want anyone else to know. Haruka is relieved and happy that Yūto is so understanding.
2	"My First Time..."; Transliteration: "Hajimete nan desu..." (Japanese: 初めてなんです...)	July 17, 2008
Because of their shared secret, Yūto and Haruka start spending more time together, even walking to school together. This arouses the anger of their peers who are annoyed that Haruka is hanging out with someone like Yūto. Haruka asks Yūto to accompany her to Akihabara on Sunday because she wants to buy a game console. The two spend most of the day window shopping and Haruka wastes some money on a toy vending machine. Yūto and Haruka even go to a maid café for lunch where Haruka is dressed in a pink maid uniform and gets her picture taken with Yūto. At the end of the day, they discover the handheld gaming console Haruka had intended to buy is sold out. This distresses Haruka since their trip was wasted, but Yūto cheers her up later by assuring her that he had a good time.
3	"It's Over..."; Transliteration: "Oshimai desu..." (Japanese: おしまいです...)	July 24, 2008
The day before a test, Haruka invites Yūto to her home to study. He is amazed to discover the size of the Nogizaka estate where he meets her younger sister, Mika, and two of the Nogizaka household maids, Hazuki Sakurazaka (head maid) and Nanami Nanashiro (third-ranking). The next day at school, a guy bumps into Haruka which spills the contents of her bag and exposes her Comiket catalog. Yūto thanks Haruka for picking 'his' catalog up for him which diverts everyone's attention to him. Even so, Haruka does not come to school for three days. When Yūto goes to see her, he finds out from Mika that Haruka's secret had been exposed in middle school and that she was ostracized for it and transferred schools. Yūto explains to Haruka that he took the hit for her, which is part of the reason Haruka stayed away. Yūto assures her that he will never leave her, which relieves her so much that the next day, when a boorish student confronts them on the way to school, she admits that the catalog was actually hers.
4	"Is it Weird...?"; Transliteration: "Hen ja nai deshō ka...?" (Japanese: 変じゃないでしょうか...?)	July 31, 2008
Yūto, Haruka, Mika and Nanami become increasingly worried about Hazuki's apparent distance from the family and thus decide to follow her on a shopping trip. Along the way they encounter a number of familiar faces including Nobunaga, Yūto's older sister, Ruko, and their teacher, Yukari Kamishiro. Nanami convinces Nobunaga to leave by pretending to have seen Kana Ueda, Nanami's VA. Mika and Nanami eventually become distracted in buying lingerie, leaving the job to Yūto and Haruka. They follow Hazuki to a bridal shop and come to the conclusion that Hazuki is about to quit her job and get married. Predictably, there is a misunderstanding at bridal shop where Yūto and Haruka are thought to be customers and have a bridal portrait taken of them together. That night, Hazuki, much to everyone's relief, explains that she is not quitting, but had gone to the hardware store located above the bridal shop to fix her chainsaw.
5	"If You Look at Me Like That..."; Transliteration: "Sonna ni Miraremasu to..." (Japanese: そんなに見られますと...)	August 7, 2008
The girl whom Yūto had already bumped into twice turns out to be Shiina Amamiya, a student who transfers into his class. Despite not being able to swim, Shiina volunteers to take part in the upcoming school swimming tournament. When they find out she can't swim, Yūto and Haruka help Shiina practice in the school pool, but Yūto's and Haruka's sisters and the maids come along too. During her leg of the race, Shiina gets a leg cramp and it is Yūto who jumps in to save her and takes her to the infirmary. She is not seriously injured, and was more shocked than anything else; Yūto reassures her that she tried her hardest, and that is what matters.
6	"It's...the Summer Comiket"; Transliteration: "Natsu Komi...desu" (Japanese: なつこみ...です)	August 14, 2008
Yūto and Haruka attend the summer Comiket together at the Tokyo Big Sight, but they underestimate the massive scale of the event and the hordes of people who attend. Mika, Hazuki, and Nanami tag along in disguise and help Haruka obtain a dōjinshi that she wanted, and get her out of trouble when people mistake her for cosplayer and start taking pictures of her. Later that evening after Yūto escorts Haruka home, Mika asks Yūto if he and Haruka noticed anyone suspicious at the convention. Later that night, a frantic Haruka shows up at Yūto's house unexpectedly.
7	"...I Love It!"; Transliteration: "...Daisuki nan desu!" (Japanese: ...大好きなんです!)	August 21, 2008
Haruka reveals that her father, Gentō, found out about her hobby and went into a rage, confiscating her anime goods but she managed to leave with her copy of Innocent Smile #1. She hides in Yūto's house alongside Hazuki, while Mika prepares a 'secret weapon' to counter their father. The next morning, Gentō arrives and assaults the Ayase house with his personal paramilitary squad, "Hell Hound". Haruka refuses to go home, and Yūto protests his disapproval of Haruka's hobby. The standoff comes to an end when Mika and Nanami arrive with their 'secret weapon': Haruka's mother, Akiho, who brings Gentō to heel and makes him leave after apologizing for his outburst.
8	"...Big Bro ☆"; Transliteration: "...Oni〜san☆" (Japanese: ...おに〜さん☆)	August 28, 2008
Mika becomes annoyed that the relationship between Yūto and her sister is not progressing as well as she expects, so she forces Yūto to go out on a date with her to teach him tips to get in the right mood with Haruka. During their date, they go to a café, and catch a movie before running into Shiina, which makes Mika jealous. Mika then drags Yūto to a kimono shop and the two are outfitted with brand-new kimonos before heading to the summer festival where they watch fireworks with Haruka, Hazuki, and Nanami who join them. Once school starts again, Shiina volunteers to be one of the organizing members for her class' participation in the upcoming cultural festival, and Yūto is dragooned into working with her.
9	"I Was Happy..."; Transliteration: "Ureshikattan desu..." (Japanese: 嬉しかったんです...)	September 4, 2008
Yūto's class decides to do a cosplay café for the school festival. Yūto asks Haruka to go to Akihabara with him to research cosplay costumes. Unknown to Yūto, Haruka had previously made a promise to her father to meet one of his clients, however she decides to go with Yūto to Akihabara instead. Gentō is furious when she does not show, and finds them in Akihabara, but once again Akiho arrives just in time to save them. Later, Haruka makes cookies and goes to give them to Yūto who is working on the cafe at school, and is shocked when she finds Yūto in a compromising position with Shiina.
10	"I Want to Be Together..."; Transliteration: "Issho ni, Itai desu..." (Japanese: 一緒に, いたいです...)	September 11, 2008
Haruka flees after seeing Yūto on top of Shiina, but when Yūto tries to explain the situation to her, Haruka says she understands and ends up running back home. The next day during the festival, Yūto finds that Haruka has apparently forgotten about the previous evening, though Shiina is not so sure. Yūto confronts Haruka about the event again, but she tells him she does not want to hear what he has to say and runs off. As he is searching for Haruka, Yūto runs into Hazuki who gives him some advice on how to move forward with Haruka. With Hazuki's help, Yūto finds Haruka behind the gym where he apologizes and assures her that he will not leave her. Afterwards, having missed the folk dance by the bonfire, the two of them dance to the tune of the music box that Yūto gave Haruka as Nanami, Mika, and Hazuki watch from the bushes.
11	"...Sorry For The Wait"; Transliteration: "...Omatase Shimashita" (Japanese: ...お待たせしました)	September 18, 2008
Mika calls Yūto late at night to invite him to Haruka's upcoming birthday party. Yūto goes to Akihabara to buy a gift and bumps into Nobunaga, who helps him in choosing the gift. After buying the gift, Yūto comes home where Hazuki and Nanami take him, along with Ruko and Yukari, to the party venue, a remote island. There, Yūto meets up with Mika and Haruka. While enjoying themselves on the beach, Yūto meets an old man and helps him search for his special fish hook. Afterwards Yūto meets some of the guests and runs afoul of a rich arrogant boy, Shute Sutherland, whose comments cause Yūto concern about both his gift for Haruka and his lack of social status.
12	"It's a Secret!"; Transliteration: "Himitsu desu!" (Japanese: 秘密です!)	September 25, 2008
The party begins and Mika drags Yūto into the hall. While waiting for his turn to present his gift, Yūto again bumps into Shute and his gift is ridiculed. Yūto becomes insecure and is about to leave when the old man from the seashore helps Yūto regain his confidence. Yūto runs back to Haruka and presents his gift, a Clumsy Aki-chan doll, and Shute is shocked to see how happy it makes her, especially considering how little it costs compared to his lavish gifts. Shute manhandles the old man who appears and reprimands him for his disrespect. He pays for his insolence when the old man is revealed to be Haruka's retired grandfather — technically the most powerful person present — and his own father forces him to publicly apologize to both Haruka's grandfather and Yūto in front of the distinguished crowd. After the party, Yūto is with Haruka in her room and he finally realizes that he was the one who gave Haruka the copy of the first issue of Innocent Smile that kick-started her otaku interests (at Nobunaga's expense). They kiss but it is ended abruptly as the others were discovered eavesdropping on them.

== Haruka Nogizaka's Secret: Purezza ==
No.	Title	Original release date
1	"I Want to Go Together..."; Transliteration: "Issho ni, Ikitai desu..." (Japanese: 一緒に、いきたいです...)	October 6, 2009
Yūto and Haruka along with several others are invited by Shiina to go on a trip to a hot spring in the mountains. Haruka is especially excited since this is her first trip with friends, due to having her hobby of watching anime being exposed in junior high school. Haruka's maids, including Alistia Rein (aka Alice, eighth-ranking) and her younger sister, Mika, as well as Ruko and Yukari also come along. When everyone is out in town, Yūto tells Haruka about an event close by where they can meet the voice actress of the lead character from her favorite anime, Nocturne Girls' School Lacrosse Club. Nobunaga runs into Yūto and gives him two tickets for the event, as he did not know he had to buy them beforehand. Haruka enjoys the event and treasures it as a precious memory.
2	"Please Put It In..."; Transliteration: "Irete Kudasai..." (Japanese: 入れてください...)	October 13, 2009
Yūto and Haruka begin making a dōjinshi together, though Haruka's skill in drawing is still lacking. Nobunaga asks Yūto to cover for him selling dōjinshi for one of his friends' dōjin circles at an upcoming event for Nocturne Girls' School Lacrosse Club. Yūto asks Haruka, who is overjoyed at the prospect of helping out an already established circle, to accompany him. Yūto and Haruka continue their work on Haruka's illustration book of the Nocturne Girls' School Lacrosse Club lead character Haruna, though on the day of the event Haruka's book is not selling. Nobunaga gives Yūto some advice, telling him that half the enjoyment is actually making the dōjinshi and Yūto realizes there are more important things than the book selling or not. Yūto goes back to Haruka and starts promoting Haruka's book, and eventually three people end up buying it. Meanwhile, Ruko and Yukari are doing something unpleasant to Shiina.
3	"Ah, It Hurts..."; Transliteration: "A, Ita..." (Japanese: あっ、痛...)	October 20, 2009
After finding out that Haruka is working to get him a Christmas present, Yūto decides to apply for a well-paying job as a part-time butler. He gets the job, but he must serve the selfish and demanding Touka Tennouji of the Tennouji household, a first-year schoolmate at Yūto's school, whose previous part-time butlers quit after a day or less under her command. Yūto does his best to satisfy Touka's requests, though she is still largely dissatisfied with this efforts. Yūto learns that Touka's family is currently deciding matters of inheritance since her grandfather died recently, and that the strain is having an adverse effect on Touka's emotional state. Through kindness and hard work, Yūto manages to gain Touka's favor, but after Ruko and Yukari invade the Tennouji mansion searching for him to cook for them (and causing severe damage to both the security force and the premises), nearly all of Yūto's pay is withheld in order to cover the costs of the repairs. Nevertheless, Touka offers to give Yūto help in the future.
4	"Yūto's Scent..."; Transliteration: "Yūto-san no Nioi..." (Japanese: 裕人さんのにおい...)	October 27, 2009
The Nogizaka family visits Yūto's house for a Christmas party, but the party is cut short when Yūto faints since he worked himself to exhaustion to earn money to buy Haruka her Christmas present. Yūto regains consciousness after Maria Yukinohara (the fifth-ranking maid) ministers to him. Haruka declares that she will stay by his side in order to nurse him back to health, under the questionable guidance of a handbook that Mika prepared. To preserve the Christmas spirit in spite of Yūto's poor health, Haruka decorates his yard with Christmas lights, and presents him with a necklace with a golden charm as Christmas present. He in turn presents her with his present: a ring (called the Moonlight) which, at Haruka's request, he places on her ring finger. Mika and the maids accentuate the moment by creating artificial snow from the rooftop.
5	"...It's Good..."; Transliteration: "...Ii..." (Japanese: ...いい...)	November 3, 2009
Yūto is invited to the annual maid and butler get-together due to his one week job at the Tennouji household. Yūto is introduced to the rest of the Nogizaka family's Maid Team (except for the unfilled post of second-rank maid). He enjoys the party in the company of Alice and meets Minamo Kusumoto (fourth-rank maid). When he wins one of the party games instead of choosing the prize he wanted, he chooses the prize Alice wanted and gives it to her, earning her gratitude and affection, an act that Kusumoto-san notices. The party atmosphere is broken by the arrival of Shute, the same rich boy who caused trouble during Haruka's birthday party, who was ordered by his father to work as a butler for a while as a lesson in humility. After having his suit accidentally dirtied by Alice, Shute shouts at her and steps on the gift Yūto gave her and spits in her face. He goes on to insult the butlers and maids at the party, stating that they are inferior beings. To everyone's surprise Yūto stands up to Shute and endures the humiliation of having a bottle of wine poured over his head, but Yūto's kind words and his treatment at the hands of Shute inspire the Nogizaka maids to deal with him. Matters turn for the worse for Shute and his lackeys when Shute's father, who has heard his son's lack of civility over the phone, apologizes to the assembled servants and gives them permission to mete out suitable chastisement. Afterwards, Yūto is complimented by all of the other guests, Alice gathers up the courage to actually speak to him (even calling him 'brother') and then the rest of the Nogizaka maid team show up, stating that, begging Haruka-sama's pardon, they are going to express how much they love Yūto too.
6	"My Body Feels Hot..."; Transliteration: "Karada ga, Atsuin desu..." (Japanese: 身体が、熱いんです...)	November 10, 2009
It is New Year's Day and everyone has gone to visit the local shrine together. Although Haruka and Yūto were hoping to spend some time together, it is not long before Haruka's admirers, who are hostile to Yūto, whisk her away. Later, after both Haruka and Yūto receive encouraging fortunes courtesy of Mika, Hazuki and Nanami who are aiding Iwai Hinasaki (tenth-ranked maid) by working as shrine miko, Haruka manages to get rid of her admirers. Haruka and Yūto bump into a mysterious girl (the idol, Milan Himemiya), who is running away from someone (an agent, Yayoi Kayahara, who offers her card to Haruka). Haruka's kimono accidentally comes undone, and she redresses in a shed alone with Yūto. Still later, Haruka takes Yūto to the cape where her parents shared their first kiss, so they can watch the new year's first sunrise together.
7	"It Might Have Gone In..."; Transliteration: "Haitchatta ka mo..." (Japanese: 入っちゃったかも...)	November 17, 2009
During the New Year's break, Shiina expects something good from the fortune she received at the shrine, and coincidentally runs into Yūto on the street. Her hairpin gets knocked into the river and Yūto goes in to retrieve it; as a "thank you" gift, Shiina prepares some cooked squid, but hurts her foot in the process. Mai and Ryouko, two of Shiina's friends, and Yūto come to pay her a visit, during which Yūto gives the three girls an unforgettable massage, a "punishment" for losing a game of old maid. Later, Yūto and the others leave for the day, but Yūto comes back because he was worried about Shiina. Yūto helps her by preparing dinner, and the two spend the rest of the night having fun together. On the day Shiina returns to school from the holidays, she is cheerful, and gets giddier with joy when she meets Yūto, even with Haruka near him.
8	"I'll Do It For You..."; Transliteration: "Shite Ageru..." (Japanese: してあげる...)	November 24, 2009
Mika invites Yūto to visit her junior high school which happens to be an all-girls' school. She introduces him to the rest of the girls in her class who are elated to finally meet him. He is surprised to find out that Mika is a popular girl at school; he has difficulty reconciling her usual personality with the fact that she is the student council president for a second year (she was elected in her freshman year and re-elected this year) and school idol, pretty much like her sister, Haruka. After meeting her classmates, Mika and her closer friends take Yūto to their club room where her friends all sit in Yūto's lap (since she has said that his lap is comfortable) much to his and Mika's discomfort. Mika then shows him her script for a play which the girls then proceed to act out. They ask Yūto for his help with acting the male lead, but are interrupted by a call for Mika, as student council president, to meet with the vice-principal. Mika returns from her meeting to find only Yūto waiting for her and they end up getting locked in the club room. The maids find them just in time to witness Mika's attempt to kiss Yūto.
9	"This is My First Experience ☆"; Transliteration: "Hatsutaiken desu ☆" (Japanese: 初体験です☆)	December 1, 2009
Haruka and Yūto finally have some time to themselves. They go to the fair to have some fun together where they meet two talent agents, Yayoi Kayahara and Nozomi Kobayakawa, who get Yūto and Haruka to take a photo shoot as a couple. Haruka's picture is taken to capture the moment of her smile (which only happens when she's with Yūto). That night, they ride on the Ferris wheel and confirm their relationship, though not without the hijinks caused by a quite shaky Ferris wheel. Yayoi and Nozomi then formally embark on their real agenda for Haruka: grooming her to be an idol. To her surprise, Haruka later receives a letter saying that she passed the audition for future models.
10	"I Didn't Expect It to Turn Into This..."; Transliteration: "Konna Koto ni Natchatte..." (Japanese: こんなことになっちゃって...)	December 8, 2009
Haruka agrees to participate in the audition as a stand-in when Yayoi and Nozomi claim she was chosen by mistake. Yūto waits as Haruka gets ready, and is told by Yayoi not to interfere. While waiting, Yūto once again bumps into the girl he met at the shrine, who turns out to be the idol, Milan Himemiya. Suddenly, Milan decides she wants Yūto as her manager since her own manager is currently in a different prefecture. Yūto and Milan go around together to a photo shoot, voice acting session and other events. Then Milan and Yūto go to a studio for the Nocturne Girls' School Lacrosse Club where Milan has to perform the anime's theme song, and Yūto is chosen to be a temporary voice actor. After he returns from working as a temporary manager, Yūto overhears Yayoi and Nozomi while they are poring over Haruka's photographs. It becomes clear to him that the talent agency actually wants Haruka to become an idol, something which Milan had tipped him to off earlier. Yayoi and Nozomi demand that Yūto distance himself from Haruka, telling him that Haruka has agreed to this.
11	"I Want to Keep Feeling It..."; Transliteration: "Kanjite Itai desu..." (Japanese: 感じていたいです...)	December 15, 2009
Yūto has to make a tough decision of whether to stay with Haruka or leave her alone so that she can become an idol. Shiina is worried about Yūto and Haruka's relationship. Milan gives Yūto invitations to attend her concert on Valentine's Day. The maids investigate and discover that Haruka is unaware of her managers' plan of turning her into an idol, meaning that Yayoi and Nozomi were lying. During the concert, Yūto, with some "on-stage prodding" from Milan, decides to leave so as to go to Haruka's idol audition. Their scheme exposed, Yayoi and Nozomi try desperately to stop Yūto from interfering. Fortunately for him, the Maid Team along with Akiho and Gento arrive to help get the upper hand against them. The final blow comes when the managers are forced out of their own talent agency since Haruka's father has bought it and all associated material in a hostile takeover. Later, at the Nogizaka mansion, while Akiho and Gento are watching Yayoi and Nozomi in a mud wrestling contest on TV, Haruka gives a Valentine's present to Yūto.
12	"It's a Promise"; Transliteration: "Yakusoku desu ♪" (Japanese: 約束です♪)	December 22, 2009
Yūto is invited to join the Nogizaka family at a ski resort in the mountains. He thinks it is just a family affair but is disappointed to find out that his entire class is coming. While the group enjoys everything that the resort has to offer, Shiina sees the trip as an opportunity to express her feelings to Yūto, but in an attempt to hug him, she ends up groping Gento. An enraged Akiho catches them in a compromising position and gets the wrong idea, causing Gento to pass on the group's shrine visitation the next day. The next evening, a blizzard arrives and Haruka goes missing on the top of the mountain. Gento sends the Maid Team out to find her. When Yūto, equipped with an insulated polar bear suit, finds her looking for the Moonlight ring he gave her, they both fall down a ridge and become stuck in a cabin. As she is wet and freezing, Haruka takes off her clothes and joins Yūto in his bear suit in just her underwear, but the two are quickly found, not only because the bear suit has a tracking device, but also because the cabin turns out to be just behind the resort. When asked what they were doing, Yūto and Haruka both answer "It's a secret".

== Haruka Nogizaka's Secret: Finale ==
No.	Title	Original release date
1	"I Made Another Wonderful Memory ♪"; Transliteration: "Mata Suteki na Omoide ga Dekimashita ♪" (Japanese: また素敵な思い出ができました♪)	August 17, 2012
Yūto and Haruka continue to get closer, while Shiina's feelings for Yūto grow stronger. A meeting to plan for their school trip to Hokkaido is held at Yūto's house, but it soon devolves into a party. Afterwards, Shiina decides to confess to Yūto during the trip. In Hokkaido, Yūto and Haruka spend their free time together, albeit accompanied by Mika, Hazuki, and Nanami, who have tagged along. At day's end, Haruka tells Yūto that she had fun and asks him if they can have another date, which he happily agrees to. Once they return to the hotel, Shiina takes Yūto out into the city and she confesses that she loves him. Haruka, who had followed them, overhears the confession.
2	"I Love You ☆"; Transliteration: "Daisuki desu ☆" (Japanese: 大好きです☆)	October 7, 2012
Yūto is unsure of how to respond to Shiina's confession, while Haruka is confused about her own feelings for Yūto. When Mika, Hazuki, and Nanami learn of her plight, Hazuki tells Haruka that they cannot help this time because Haruka must determine how she feels about Yūto on her own. Haruka tries to speak with Yūto, but is unable to do so and is left in tears when Shiina pulls him away. After spending the day with Shiina, Yūto comes to realize the depth of his feelings for Haruka, and parts ways with Shiina to look for Haruka. When he finds her, he confesses his love for her and Haruka reciprocates. They officially become a couple, while agreeing to keep their new relationship secret between themselves. After returning home, Haruka asks Yūto if they can form a doujinshi circle for the upcoming Summer Comiket, and he agrees to it.
3	"I Love Anime"; Transliteration: "Watashi wa, Anime ga Daisuki desu!" (Japanese: 私は、アニメが大好きです!)	October 28, 2012
Yūto and Haruka make progress on a scenario for an anime game. They present the completed game at Comiket. Nobunaga then shows up saying that three girls were looking for their stand. When Yūto and Nobunaga arrive with the three girls, Haruka freezes. The girls turn out to be her former "best friends" from when she was in middle school. They have come to apologize for turning their backs on Haruka when her secret was exposed back in middle school (even admitting that they like anime too); Haruka forgives them. As they talk things out, it is revealed that Setsugetsuka Tennouji, Haruka's archrival, influenced everyone to isolate Haruka. Later that night, after their game sells out thanks to Nobunaga's advertising, Mika calls Yūto and informs him that her sister is missing. Just as Yūto is about head over to assist in the search, Akiho calls Yūto that she knows where Haruka is and she is safe, but she is getting married the next day.
4	"The Secret Between the Two of Us ☆"; Transliteration: "Futari Dake no Himitsu, desu ☆" (Japanese: 二人だけの秘密、です☆)	November 25, 2012
Setsugetsuka is gloating over having been able to cause Haruka misfortune. The Maid Team arrives at Yūto's house to pick him up and they board a jet to where Haruka is being held with the aim of stopping her marriage. Elsewhere, Touka departs for the marriage location as well. Upon parachuting in and infiltrating the building, the maids and everyone else sacrifice themselves to fight the "Hell Hounds" allowing Yūto and Mika to proceed. Ultimately, Yūto has to fight Haruka's father, while Haruka has to fight her own mother to prove their love. They succeed and come to embrace one another. Everyone then appears and applauds; as it turns out Gento and Akiho had set the whole event up to test how strong the bond between Yūto and Haruka truly is, so they can make an official wedding for them. Setsugetsuka steps in to interfere, summoning the Tennouji clan's knight, but is surprised to learn the knight has already been dealt with by Touka. Haruka and Yūto then get married and are finally able to kiss without interruption.
