= After-School Duty =

Japanese light novel series

- First light novel volume cover

ほうかごがかり (Hōkagogakari)
- Genre: Dark fantasy; Supernatural
- Light novel
- Written by: Gakuto Coda
- Illustrated by: potg
- Published by: ASCII Media Works
- Imprint: Dengeki Bunko
- Original run: January 10, 2024 – present
- Volumes: 7
- Manga
- Written by: Gakuto Coda
- Illustrated by: Meiji
- Published by: Kadokawa Shoten
- English publisher: NA: Yen Press
- Imprint: Kadokawa Comics A
- Magazine: Comp Ace
- Original run: July 26, 2024 – present
- Volumes: 3
- icon

After-School Duty (ほうかごがかり, Hōkagogakari) is a Japanese light novel series written by Gakuto Coda and illustrated by potg. It began publication under ASCII Media Works's Dengeki Bunko imprint in January 2024, with seven volumes released as of August 2026. A manga adaptation illustrated by Meiji began serialization in Kadokawa Shoten's Comp Ace magazine in July 2024, and has been compiled into two volumes as of September 2025.

== Plot ==
Kei Nimori, a sixth-grader, becomes suspicious one day when he sees his name and the words "after-school duty" on his classroom blackboard. Later that night, he hears a school bell ring and a call to go to after-school duty. He suddenly himself in a mysterious school along with six others, including his former friend Sei Ogata. They are tasked with "after-school duty" by documenting the school's so-called Unnamed Mysteries, which manifest as monsters that haunt the school each night between 12:12:12 AM and 4:44:44 AM.

== Characters ==
Kei Nimori (二森 啓, Nimori Kei)
A student who is summoned one night to another dimension. Together with six others, he becomes one of the Hōkagogakari, a group aiming at investigating the monsters that roam Hōkago. He is a skilled artist and uses his drawing skills in investigating monsters.
Sei Ogata (緒方 惺, Ogata Sei)
A student who goes to the same school as Kei. He was previously Kei's best friend and the only one at school who appreciated Kei's art, but the two had drifted apart.
Maaya Kenjō (見上 真彩, Kenjō Maaya)
Iruma Seto (瀬戸 イルマ, Seto Iruma)
Ruki Kojima (小嶋 瑠希, Kojima Ruki)
Raku Dōjima (堂島 楽, Dōjima Raku)
Sensei (先生)
A student who is also nicknamed Tarō-san (太郎さん) and tasks the others with their "after-school duty" of documenting the Unnamed Mysteries.

== Development ==
Gakuto Coda had been developing the manga for over ten years, having been inspired by tropes such as the Seven School Mysteries in Japanese schools as well as his own life as an elementary school student. He wanted to use the Seven School Mysteries as a major theme, depicting them as being incomprehensible or horrific, in contrast to them often being depicted in a more light-hearted manner in other works. He wanted the characters to feel as if they were truly sent to another world and found themselves in an "alien" situation. Despite his reputation for writing horror works, he considered himself as more of a fairy tale writer and wanted to incorporate folklore elements as well.

== Media ==
=== Light novel ===
The series is written by Gakuto Coda, who previously wrote the horror novel series Missing and Danshō no Grimm, and features illustrations by potg. It is published by ASCII Media Works under their Dengeki Bunko imprint, with the first volume being released on January 10, 2024. Seven volumes have been published as of August 7, 2026. A promotional video narrated by Akari Kito was released on August 12, 2024.

No.	Release date	ISBN
1	January 10, 2024	978-4-04-915199-2
2	February 9, 2024	978-4-04-915383-5
3	May 10, 2024	978-4-04-915200-5
4	February 7, 2025	978-4-04-915850-2
5	July 10, 2025	978-4-04-915851-9
6	December 10, 2025	978-4-04-916602-6
7	August 7, 2026	978-4-04-916977-5

=== Manga ===
A manga adaptation illustrated by Meiji began serialization in Kadokawa Shoten's Comp Ace magazine on July 26, 2024. The first tankōbon volume was released on February 26, 2025; three volumes have been released as of August 25, 2026.

In May 2026, Yen Press announced that they had licensed the manga adaptation for English publication. The first volume is scheduled for release in November 2026.

No.	Original release date	Original ISBN	North American release date	North American ISBN
1	February 26, 2025	978-4-04-115862-3	November 24, 2026	979-8-8554-3276-3
2	September 24, 2025	978-4-04-116472-3	March 23, 2027	979-8-8554-5161-0
3	August 25, 2026	978-4-04-117078-6	—	—

== Reception ==
The series was ranked seventh in the New Title ranking in the 2025 edition of Takarajimasha's Kono Light Novel ga Sugoi! guidebook. The series was also ranked ninth in the bunkobon category at the 2024 Next Light Novel Awards. The series was ranked fifth in the same category at the 2025 Next Light Novel Awards.

Writing for Da Vinci News, Minami Asato praised the first volume of the light novel, being thrilled by the story, which she felt got scarier as the volume went on. She noted how vivid the volume was, to the point that it was as if its scariness could even encroach on reality.
