= Ballad of a Shinigami =

Japanese light novel series

- English cover of the first light novel volume

しにがみのバラッド。 (Shinigami no Baraddo.)
- Genre: Supernatural
- Light novel
- Written by: K-Ske Hasegawa
- Illustrated by: Nanakusa
- Published by: ASCII Media Works
- English publisher: NA: Seven Seas Entertainment
- Magazine: Dengeki hp (former); Dengeki Bunko Magazine
- Original run: June 10, 2003 – April 10, 2009
- Volumes: 12
- Manga
- Written by: K-Ske Hasegawa
- Illustrated by: Asuka Izumi
- Published by: Hakusensha
- English publisher: NA: CMX Manga
- Magazine: LaLa, LaLa DX
- Original run: May 24, 2005 – February 10, 2007
- Volumes: 3
- Anime television series

Momo, Girl God of Death ~ Ballad of a Shinigami
- Directed by: Tomomi Mochizuki
- Produced by: Tatsuya Ishiguro
- Written by: Reiko Yoshida
- Music by: Moka
- Studio: Group TAC, Ginga-ya
- Licensed by: AUS: Bost Digital Entertainment; NA: Maiden Japan
- Original network: WOWOW
- English network: US: Anime Network
- Original run: March 3, 2006 – April 7, 2006
- Episodes: 6
- Television drama
- Directed by: Kōtarō Terauchi
- Studio: Tornado Film, SF Planning
- Original network: TV Tokyo
- Original run: January 9, 2007 – March 27, 2007
- Episodes: 12

Ballad of a Shinigami (しにがみのバラッド。, Shinigami no Baraddo.), subtitled Momo: The Girl God of Death, is a Japanese light novel series written by K-Ske Hasegawa, with illustrations by Nanakusa. The series includes twelve novels released between June 10, 2003, and April 10, 2009, published by ASCII Media Works under their Dengeki Bunko imprint. The novels were licensed by Seven Seas Entertainment for release in English with the first novel released in March 2008. The series revolves around Momo, a shinigami, and her familiar Daniel, a talking black cat, as they interfere with the world of the living.

A radio drama of the series aired on ASCII Media Works' Dengeki Taishō radio program between April and May 2005, and the recordings were collected into a drama CD released in June 2005. A manga adaptation by Asuka Izumi was serialized in Hakusensha's shōjo manga magazines LaLa and LaLa DX between May 2005 and February 2007. A six-episode anime adaptation of the series produced by Group TAC aired between March and April 2006 on WOWOW satellite TV. Lastly, a TV drama which aired on TV Tokyo was produced between January and March 2007, containing twelve episodes.

== Plot and characters ==
Anime cast

Role	Japanese voice actor	English voice actor
Momo	Akiko Kobayashi	Jessica Boone
Daniel	Ai Shimizu	Nancy Novotny

Ballad of a Shinigami primarily centers around a young-looking girl named Momo (モモ) who is a shinigami, or death god. Momo is clad in all white, along with having long white hair, and as a god of death, she leads deceased souls to the other side. She carries with her a large scythe and an ID card which helps to facilitate in her identification as a shinigami; her shinigami ID number is A-100100. Momo is different from other shinigami because she tries to ease the suffering of the people she encounters whether they be living or already dead, such as conveying messages from the dead to the living. She is also known to cry a lot, and she says that she cries for the dead because they no longer can. Accompanying Momo is a talking black cat familiar named Daniel (ダニエル, Danieru) with a bell around his neck and bat-like wings who helps Momo out. The living frequently hear the ringing of Daniel's bell when Momo and Daniel are nearby. Daniel has a calm character and does not show as much sympathy to humans as Momo, but is still patient with them. In the TV drama, Daniel is portrayed as a young boy rather than a cat. The story follows Momo and Daniel as they interact with the living and usually consists of them changing something sorrowful for the living.

Another shinigami featured in the series is also a young-looking girl named An (アン) who is clad in all black, along with having black hair. Like Momo, she shows outward emotion towards the living and dead, but An has a cruel personality and does not give mercy to anyone. Despite the fact that shinigami are meant to transport souls to the other side, An chooses to terminate the souls of the people she kills. Among shinigami, she is very powerful, and is referred to as a special type of shinigami. Her shinigami ID number is A-99. Accompanying An is a talking gray cat familiar named Nicolas (ニコラウス, Nikorausu), but is referred to as Nicol (ニコル, Nikoru) for short. Before starting to work with An, Nicol had once been very close friends with Daniel.

== Media ==
=== Light novels ===
Ballad of a Shinigami is a series of light novels written by K-Ske Hasegawa, and drawn by Nanakusa. Twelve novels were published by ASCII Media Works under their Dengeki Bunko publishing imprint between June 10, 2003, and April 10, 2009. Twenty-one chapters, plus another five more special chapters, were serialized in MediaWorks' now-defunct light novel magazine Dengeki hp. Of the main twenty-one chapters, seven were later included in the released light novel volumes. The novels were licensed by Seven Seas Entertainment for release in English; the first volume was released in March 2008. Seven Seas published the first two light novels in the original pocket format used in Japan, rather than the larger standard size normally used for manga and North American releases of Japanese light novels. Seven Seas dropped the series after the second novel though for unknown reasons.

A four-chapter spin off of the series entitled Cheerful Charmer Momo was also created. The first chapter was made available through mail order via the summer 2004 edition of Dengeki hp, though chapters one, three, and four were serialized in other now-defunct MediaWorks light novel anthologies which include Dengeki p, Dengeki hPa, and Dengeki Bunkoyomi. Another spin-off series of short stories entitled Ballad of a Shinigami: Unknown Stars began serialization in ASCII Media Works' light novel magazine Dengeki Bunko Magazine on February 9, 2008. The stories are illustrated by Keiji Yamamoto, though Nanakusa provides the visual concepts that Yamamoto uses as a base for the stories. The story is different from the original, and is primarily a "school life" story. The first volume of Unknown Stars was released on September 10, 2008, and as of December 10, 2009, three volumes have been released under Dengeki Bunko.

=== Art books ===
A sixty-four-page picture book entitled Ballad of a Shinigami: One Love Song (しにがみのバラッド. ひとつのあいのうた., Shinigami no Baraddo.: Hitotsu no Ai no Uta.) was written and illustrated by the same creators of the light novels and released by ASCII Media Works on January 28, 2005, under their Dengeki Bunko Visual Novel label. A 108-page art book illustrated by Nanakusa was released by ASCII Media Works on April 6, 2006, and also contained an original Ballad of a Shinigami short story by K-Ske Hasegawa.

=== Audio dramas ===
The second chapter of the Cheerful Charmer Momo spin-off was originally broadcast as a four-episode radio drama between April 9, 2005, and May 2005 on ASCII Media Works' Dengeki Taishō radio program. The radio drama was later released as a drama CD through mail order via volume thirty-six of Dengeki hp released on June 18, 2005. The CD contained the radio drama recording called "Hikari no Kiseki." (ヒカリのキセキ.) plus a new track titled "Snow Rebirth", and also one secret track. The CD came with an original story booklet containing a short story entitled "Daniel's Discovery." (だにえるのはっけん., Danieru no Hakken.), a small hand mirror, and an original sticker set. In the drama, Momo was voiced by Mamiko Noto, and Daniel was voiced by Ryō Hirohashi. Another radio drama, again four episodes long and broadcast on Dengeki Taishō, aired between January 12, 2008, and February 2008. The new drama was based on the story "Toward Your Transparency and Carbonated Water." (炭酸水と透明のキミへ., Tansaisui to Tōmei no Kimi e.) from volume ten of the light novels. The radio drama was later released as a drama CD through mail order via volume one of Dengeki Bunko Magazine released on April 10, 2008. The CD contained the drama's opening and ending themes, the radio drama recording "Toward Your Transparency and Carbonated Water." plus a new track titled "Usagi no Naku Hō e." (うさぎのなくほうへ.), and also one secret track. The CD came with an original sticker set and a notepad.

Pony Canyon Region 2 box set for the Ballad of a Shinigami anime series

=== Manga ===
A twelve-chapter manga adaptation illustrated by Asuka Izumi was serialized in two shōjo manga magazines published by Hakusensha—LaLa, and LaLa DX—though nine chapters were serialized in LaLa DX, two were serialized in LaLa, and one (the prologue) was only included in volume one of the bound volumes. The first chapter was serialized on May 24, 2005, in LaLa, and ended in LaLa DX on February 10, 2007. Three volumes comprising four chapters each were released under Haksensha's Hana to Yume Comics label between March 4, 2006, and June 10, 2007. The manga has been licensed by CMX for distribution in North America.

=== Anime ===
An anime adaptation produced by Group TAC, directed by Tomomi Mochizuki, and written by Reiko Yoshida aired on WOWOW in Japan between March 3, 2006, and April 7, 2006, containing six episodes. The anime has been licensed by Japanese-based company Bost Digital Entertainment for distribution through their video streaming website Bost TV with English subtitles. The episodes are available only to Australia and New Zealanders for the price of US$1.99 per episode. In the anime, Momo was voiced by Akiko Kobayashi, and Daniel was voiced by Ai Shimizu. The anime's opening theme is "No One" and the ending theme is "White Messenger"; both songs are sung by Koy, and the maxi single containing the theme songs was released by Pony Canyon on March 15, 2006. Notably, the opening theme is sung entirely in English while the ending theme has normal Japanese lyrics. The anime's original soundtrack was released on April 26, 2006, containing twenty-two music tracks and eight audio drama tracks. Three DVD compilation volumes were released by Pony Canyon between June 7, 2006, and August 2, 2006, each with two episodes each, and were sold in limited and regular editions. The DVD box set containing the six episodes was released on February 20, 2008. The anime is licensed by Maiden Japan, and the series was distributed on DVD by Section23 Films on June 25, 2013.

==== Episodes ====
No.	Title	Original release date
1	"Your Voice" "Kimi no Koe." (Japanese: きみのこえ.)	March 3, 2006
Kōta Seto, a young boy in grade school, spends a lot of his time with his friend Mai Makihara due to her constant asthma attacks. One day while walking home from school, they find an abandoned kitten (which Mai names Blue) in a box in a park, and due to Mai's persistence, they end up moving it to a nearby shrine where they take care of it by visiting it daily and giving it food. Mai realizes that she is preventing Kōta from playing with his other friends, and one day Kōta agrees to play in a soccer game while Mai goes to check on Blue. That day, it starts to rain, and on her way home, Mai is taken to the hospital and soon after dies. Kōta blames the cat for Mai's death and intended to leave it for dead, but Momo, a shinigami, intervenes and gives Kōta the chance to speak with Mai once more, who asks for Kōta to care for the cat as her final wish.
2	"Days as a Fish" "Sakana no Koro." (Japanese: さかなのころ.)	March 10, 2006
Mitsuki Asano, a male high school student, is in the school pool one night and Momo appears before him, telling him that he is going to die soon. Due to this, he starts thinking more about his now-dead older sister and how she died before him even though she was more athletic and more capable than him. Mitsuki starts hanging out more with Yutaka Fujishima from his class, and she one days confesses that she likes him. He tells her that he is going to die soon, but she takes this as a cruel way to reject her. Momo appears before Mitsuki a couple more times and ultimately gets him to realize that he has to live his own life. In the end, Momo was just trying to make Mitsuki change his way of life by telling him he was going to die soon, but this turns out to be a lie.
3	"Beyond the Light" "Hikari no Kanata." (Japanese: ひかりのかなた.)	March 17, 2006
Kantarō Ichihara is a boy in junior-high school, and the high school entrance examination period is coming up. His grandfather, who loved playing games, recently died, and while cleaning out his room Kantarō finds a message from his grandfather about a game involving a treasure hunt. Kantarō skips out on extra lessons at school to go look for the treasure in his grandfather's old country town, accompanied by his childhood friend Tomato. On the way Kantarō sees a young boy and girl several times, and in the end they lead him to where the treasure is buried, which turns out to be a large marble and a short note left by Kantarō's grandfather. It turns out that Daniel and Momo changed their appearances to those of Kantarō's then-young grandfather and his childhood friend in order to lead Kantarō to the treasure.
4	"Autumn Magic" "Aki no Mahō." (Japanese: あきのまほう.)	March 24, 2006
Chiaki Kazama, a junior-high school student, is trying to keep her family going by filling in for her mother who recently died. She takes up the role of waking up her father and younger brother Fuyuki and making them breakfast, but cannot quite make French toast like her mother could. Their father leaves on a business trip for a couple of days, and soon after Fuyuki tells Chiaki that he saw a shinigami in his room and even played with her. This unsettles Chiaki, thinking that he is going to die soon, but later meets the shinigami Momo and finds out that she and Daniel are merely babysitting Fuyuki for the time being due to Chiaki's mother worrying about her. Through Momo, Chiaki is able to talk with her mother again, and even learns how to make French toast like her. The next day, a boy from Chiaki's class named Nakayami, who previously showed concern for her well being, comes to meet her in the morning, and the two walk home to school holding hands.
5	"Glow of a Firefly" "Hotaru no Hikari." (Japanese: ほたるのひかり.)	March 31, 2006
Eko Miyazaki, a junior-high school student, is troubled that there are bad rumors going around at a local elementary school about a ghost causing problems, and Eko believes that the ghost is her older sister who had been a teacher at the school but recently died. Eko meets Kōta Seto and learns of his ability to see ghosts and a shinigami. She asks for his help to find her sister in the school in order to tell her that she is sorry about saying she hated her right before she died. They sneak into the school at night and eventually Eko's sister appears in her old classroom. Eko is able to apologize to her in tears and her older sister's spirit disappears. Eko is now finally able to smile for the first time since her sister died.
6	"Journey of the Heart" "Kokoro no Tabi." (Japanese: こころのたび.)	April 7, 2006
Sakura Kosakai wakes up dazed on the street wondering where she is and realizes that she has to go to school. At school she discovers that people are ignoring her, and she cannot even press the buttons on the vending machine for lunch. She finally remembers that she jumped off a bridge after seeing the boy she liked kiss another girl, and when Sakura goes to the bridge, she meets Momo and Daniel. Sakura takes them around town to check up on those she knew, though they seem fine even though it has only been three days since the accident. Momo takes her out again to check up one the same people as before, and she sees that she is still remembered by her loved ones and friends despite what it initially seemed like. After this, Momo reveals to Sakura that she did not die, but instead her spirit left her body after the accident. After returning to her body, Sakura goes on with her life.

=== TV drama ===
A TV drama directed by Kōtarō Terauchi aired on TV Tokyo between January 9, 2007, and March 27, 2007, containing twelve episodes. It was the second TV drama from Dengeki Bunko since Hanbun no Tsuki ga Noboru Sora. The opening theme is "Senkō" (閃光; lit. 'Flash') by Sacra, and the ending theme is "No Surprises" (Radiohead cover) by Triceratops. Momo was portrayed by Shōko Hamada, and Daniel was played by Riko Yoshida. Six DVD compilation volumes were sold: volumes one and two were released on April 27, 2007, volumes three and four were released on May 25, 2007, and volumes five and six were sold on June 22, 2007; each volume contained two episodes.

== Reception ==
Overall reviews of the anime adaptation titled Momo, Girl God of Death have been mixed. Theron Martin from Anime News Network gave both the subtitled and dubbed versions a C+ grade overall. Theron states that the first story is "sappy", with the overall stories not being fulfilling. He calls the art "mediocre" and also criticizes the poor English dub mispronunciations. Theron though also describes Momo's character as cute, and "interestingly different" for her role. Stig Høgset from THEM Anime Reviews called the anime melancholic, and tacky at points but is a series that sticks in your memory. Chris Beveridge from The Fandom Post also gave the anime a review saying it felt like a "90s OVA". He also went on to praise the series for being short but sweet giving the anime an overall B grade. In March 2007, it was reported by Mediaworks that over 1.3 million copies of the first ten light novel volumes were sold in Japan.
