= Risa Yoshiki =

Japanese gravure idol and singer (born 1987)

- Born: July 27, 1987 (age 38); Funabashi, Chiba Prefecture, Japan
- Occupations: gravure idol; singer
- Spouse: Masato Wada (m. 2017)

Risa Yoshiki (吉木 りさ) is a Japanese gravure idol and singer. She has released two singles, seven DVDs, and appears regularly on TV and radio.

== Life and career ==
Yoshiki was born in Funabashi in Chiba Prefecture near Tokyo. She originally wanted to be a manga artist when growing up. In her first year of high school, she was scouted in Harajuku by the Fitone (Note: フィットワン) agency. She decided to become an enka singer and trained for two years.

In November 2004, she released a DVD of images, "Koi", although her parents were opposed to a career in glamour modelling. From 2009 she became a regular on a variety programme called Campus Night Fuji. In 2010, the programme finished. She also graduated from the Asia University of Japan in the same year.

Her debut as a singer was a cover version of Yozakura Oshichi, originally sung by Fuyumi Sakamoto. She went on to perform with others in the cast of Campus Night Fuji in a group called Campus Nighters. In March 2011 she released a single Destin Histoire under the name "yoshiki*lisa".

In 2010, a television variety programme chose her as the woman with the most beautiful face in an encyclopedia of Japanese celebrities.

In February 2011 her DVDs dominated Amazon.co.jp's rankings for sales of idol DVDs, occupying first, second, third and fourth places. Idol commentator Hideo Horikoshi attributes her success to the contrast of her genuine beauty, of the kind not usually found in glamour models, with a willingness to pose for pictures including crotch shots, cosplay, and bondage poses.

== Appearances ==
=== Variety ===
- DOWN TOWN DX
- Tensai! Shimura Dōbutsuen (2011)
- Korenande Shoukai

=== Drama ===
- Tokusou Sentai Dekaranger (2004) episodes 3, 4
- Hataraki Man (2007)
- Teen Court: 10-dai Saiban (2012)
- Tokumei Sentai Go-Busters (2012)

=== Film ===
- We Are Little Zombies (2019)

=== Stage ===
- VISUALIVE Persona 4 (2012)

=== Radio ===
- GEKIDAN SAMBA CARNIVAL
- DJ Tomoaki's Radio Show! Assistant, 3 appearances
- The Nutty Radio Show OniOni (2010–present) Wednesday assistant
- Yoshiki Risa No Enjoi Dorabingu Sandei (Risa Yoshiki's Enjoy Driving Sunday) (April–June 2011)
- Dengeki Taishō (October 2011–present)

=== Commercials ===
- DMM.com

== Media ==
=== DVDs ===
- Yoshiki Risa Koi (2004)
- mitu＊mitu (2011)
- kako (2011)
- Captive (2014)

=== Photo books ===
- Heaven (2011)
- RISA MANIA (2011)

== Music ==
=== Discography ===
- Poche (as yoshiki*lisa) 28 March 2012
