= Haruka Nogizaka's Secret =

Japanese light novel series

- First light novel volume cover, featuring Haruka Nogizaka

乃木坂春香の秘密
- Genre: Romantic comedy
- Light novel
- Written by: Yūsaku Igarashi
- Illustrated by: Shaa
- Published by: ASCII Media Works
- Imprint: Dengeki Bunko
- Original run: October 10, 2004 – July 10, 2012
- Volumes: 16
- Manga
- Written by: Yūsaku Igarashi
- Illustrated by: Yasuhiro Miyama
- Published by: ASCII Media Works
- Magazine: Dengeki Moeoh
- Original run: October 2006 – August 2010
- Volumes: 4
- Anime television series
- Directed by: Munenori Nawa
- Written by: Gō Tamai
- Music by: Takeshi Watanabe
- Studio: Studio Barcelona
- Licensed by: NA: Discotek Media
- Original network: CTC, tvk, TVS, Yomiuri TV, Chukyo TV, AT-X
- Original run: July 3, 2008 – September 25, 2008
- Episodes: 12
- Anime television series

Haruka Nogizaka's Secret: Purezza
- Directed by: Munenori Nawa
- Written by: Gō Tamai
- Music by: Takeshi Watanabe
- Studio: Studio Barcelona
- Licensed by: NA: Discotek Media
- Original network: Yomiuri TV, Tokyo MX, AT-X, tvk
- Original run: October 6, 2009 – December 22, 2009
- Episodes: 12
- Original video animation

Haruka Nogizaka's Secret: Finale
- Directed by: Munenori Nawa
- Written by: Gō Tamai
- Studio: Studio Barcelona
- Released: August 17, 2012 – November 25, 2012
- Runtime: 24 minutes each
- Episodes: 4
- Video games
- Haruka Nogizaka's Secret: Cosplay Hajimemashita (2008); Haruka Nogizaka's Secret: Dōjinshi Hajimemashita (2010)
- Related work
- Menacing Dog's

Haruka Nogizaka's Secret (Japanese: 乃木坂春香の秘密, Hepburn: Nogizaka Haruka no Himitsu) is a Japanese light novel series by Yūsaku Igarashi, with illustrations by Shaa. The series originally started serialization in MediaWorks' now-defunct light novel magazine Dengeki hp on June 18, 2004. The first novel was released in October 2004, and as of January 2012, 15 volumes have been published by ASCII Media Works under their Dengeki Bunko imprint. A manga adaptation by Yasuhiro Miyama was serialized in ASCII Media Works' Dengeki Moeoh between the October 2006 and August 2010 issues. An anime adaptation produced by Studio Barcelona aired between July and September 2008; a second anime season aired between October and December 2009. A visual novel for the PlayStation 2 was released in Japan in September 2008 and a second game for the PlayStation Portable was released for digital download in February 2010.

== Plot ==
The story is set at Hakujō Academy, a private high school in Japan, and centers around Yūto Ayase and his classmate Haruka Nogizaka. While Yūto is rather ordinary, Haruka is attractive, intelligent, and wealthy, making her the school's most unattainable girl who is idolized by her peers. One day, Yūto's good friend Nobunaga Asakura asks him to return a book to the school library, and when he goes to return it, Yūto stumbles across Haruka. It's then that he learns she's been keeping a secret for years—she is a diehard fan of anime, manga, and the otaku culture. Yūto promises to keep his lips sealed, since Haruka's hobby is considered unworthy of her status, and the two become close friends and start spending much of their time together. Yūto does his best to help hide Haruka's hobby while further developing his relationship with her.

== Characters ==
=== Main characters ===
Yūto Ayase (綾瀬 裕人, Ayase Yūto)
Voiced by: Wataru Hatano
Yūto is an ordinary student in his second year of high school who attends Hakujō Academy, a private high school. Yūto lives with his parents and older sister, Ruko, though his parents are always working and, thus, are generally absent from home. He behaves bluntly and generally likes to be left alone. He has an average determination to study for school. One day, he stumbles across his classmate Haruka in the library and discovers her hidden secret—that she is an otaku who loves everything anime and manga. He agrees to keep her secret and over time they become closer, arousing envy and jealousy in his classmates. Even though he and Haruka are close, he sometimes believes that since he is not wealthy he cannot officially be her boyfriend. Eventually he comes to realize that her family loves and accepts him (even Haruka's father).
Haruka Nogizaka (乃木坂 春香, Nogizaka Haruka)
Voiced by: Mamiko Noto
Haruka is Yūto's classmate. Due to her beauty and intelligence, she is idolized at school and regarded as the school's most unattainable girl, even known by the French nicknames Nuit Étoile (The Night Star) and Lumière du Clavier (The Piano's Light). She is skilled at playing the piano and has won international competitions. She also has a gentle personality, is a natural airhead, and is quite clumsy. Her deeply hidden secret is that she is an otaku and loves anime and manga. In middle school, her secret was exposed and she was shunned because of it, even by her best friends. This experience caused her to become introverted while maintaining an outwardly happy persona. She transferred schools and kept her hobby a secret once she entered high school. When Yūto finds out about it, Haruka is relieved that he does not tell anyone or harass her about it and, over the course of the series, develops romantic feelings for him. She comes from a rich family and a privileged upbringing, so her interest in the otaku subculture is looked down upon due to her status in society, which is another reason why she keeps it a secret. Her interest in otaku culture stems from an encounter she had several years previously: having fled to a park after being scolded by her father, Haruka was cheered by a copy of the first issue of Innocent Smile given to her by a boy she met (later revealed to have been Yūto who was helping Nobunaga carry his haul of otaku merchandise home). While being talented in several areas, she cannot draw well but does not realize it because she is too proud of her drawings for anyone to tell her directly.

=== Classmates and teachers ===
Nobunaga Asakura (朝倉 信長, Asakura Nobunaga)
Voiced by: Reiko Takagi
Nobunaga is Yūto's childhood friend of who attends the same private high school, although he is in a different class. He has a cheerful and openhearted personality, gets very good grades, and is considered a bishōnen by the female students, but despite his good looks, he doesn't have a girlfriend because he is a hardcore otaku and not afraid to let others know. Because of his hobby he is intimately familiar with the layout of Akihabara and is a very well regarded frequent customer in various stores in Akihabara. Due to the number of purchases he has had over the years, he is known as "Kaiser" at the Animate store, and is one of three people in possession of a golden Animate card. A picture of him shaking hands with the manager of the café where Haruka once worked part time, called "@Home ~Café", is framed in gold with the caption "Welcome home, our greatest master". He is well aware of Yūto and Haruka's relationship despite their efforts to keep it hidden but thinks nothing of it.
Yukari Kamishiro (上代 由香里, Kamishiro Yukari)
Voiced by: Miyu Matsuki
Yukari is the vice-homeroom teacher of Yūto's class and is an old friend of his sister, Ruko. As a consequence she spends a lot of time at the Ayase house, often drunk and making Yūto's home life difficult. Yūto refers to as the "sexual harassment teacher". She is constantly smiling and she enjoys teasing trouble makers. At school, she is in charge of teaching music. She is twenty-three years old, though refers to herself as "eternally seventeen", and is unmarried but always on the hunt for a boyfriend. There is a possibility that she is the rumored teacher who graduated from this same school and is famous in the music world as the Performer of the Sunset.
Shiina Amamiya (天宮 椎菜, Amamiya Shiina)
Voiced by: Rina Satō
Shiina is a girl who participated in the London Piano Contest with Haruka; Shiina placed second after Haruka who ranked first. She transfers into Yūto's class at school. Her hobbies include playing the piano and the martial art of naginatajutsu. She always has a positive, cheerful and sociable personality. This makes her transition as a transfer student very easy. She used to live in Otaru, Hokkaidō, Japan, but does not speak much of those days. She shows an interest for Yūto as she believes there must be a reason why they constantly bump into each other. She states that one of the reasons she chose Yūto's school to transfer to is because of a famous teacher, who graduated from the school and was known as the Performer of the Sunset, and who is teaching at the school.
Mai Asahina (朝比奈 麻衣, Asahina Mai)
Voiced by: Aki Toyosaki
Mai is a girl in Yūto's class. She generally has a quiet personality, though is vice-president of the naginatajutsu club. She is close friends with Shiina and Ryōko. She has a small role in the first season of the anime adaptation, but appears as a regular character in Purezza.
Ryōko Sawamura (澤村 良子, Sawamura Ryōko)
Voiced by: Eri Kitamura
Ryōko is a classmate and close friend of Shiina and Mai, and is often seen with them. As opposed to the quiet Mai, she is quite boisterous and hyperactive. She often refers to Shiina as "Shiina-cchi" and Yūto as "Ayase-cchi". She notices that Shiina feels something for Yūto, so she (and Mai) encourage her to go for him, perhaps oblivious to the fact that Yūto and Haruka only have eyes for one another.
Nagai, Takenami, & Ogawa (永井・竹浪・小川)
Voiced by: Eiji Miyashita (Nagai), Voiced by: Hiroki Yasumoto (Takenami), Voiced by: Jun Ōsuka (Ogawa)
Nagai, Takenami, and Ogawa are a group of male students in Yūto's class obsessed with girls. Everyone refers to them as the "three idiots" because they always get into idiotic discussions. These three wish for the same wishes every New Year, and get the same fortune slips that indicate terrible luck.
Tōka Tennōji (天王寺 冬華, Tennōji Tōka)
Voiced by: Rie Kugimiya
Tōka is a first year student at Yūto's school. She is known by the nickname Princess Blizzard at school because of her domineering and arrogant personality. She comes from a family (known as "The Tenōji of the West") whose wealth may rival that of Haruka's family, "The Nogizaka of the East". Yūto worked as her personal butler for a time to earn money for Haruka's Christmas present. After the head of the family died at age 147, she became the third in line to inherit the family fortune. Her stated ultimate goal is world conquest. She has a cameo in the first season of the anime adaptation.

=== Nogizaka family ===
Mika Nogizaka (乃木坂 美夏, Nogizaka Mika)
Voiced by: Mai Goto
Mika is Haruka's 14-year-old younger sister in her second year of junior high school. Her hobbies include playing the violin, playing squash, caring for wild pigs, and spying on her sister and Yūto. She has a personality that is the exact opposite of her sister's, who is naïve. She enjoys Yūto's company and she often calls him "Onii-san" (an affectionate word meaning older brother, brother-in-law, or a brother-like male figure). When Haruka is with Yūto, however, Mika likes to tease them. In contrast to her airhead older sister, Mika is very stable. Even at her young age, she is more knowledgeable about sex than Haruka in principle, although she does get shocked or stunned if exposed to H-rated material just like her sister. She shows some interest in Yūto after their date. She is deathly afraid of ghosts. She has been running for the student council president of her all girl school for two consecutive years. She is just as much as an idol as her sister at school and is known by the name Moonlight Strawberry.
Gentō Nogizaka (乃木坂 玄冬, Nogizaka Gentō)
Voiced by: Fumihiko Tachiki
Gentō is Haruka's and Mika's father. His last name is adopted from his wife's family. He is a loving parent who dotes on his daughters though his speech and conduct makes him seem like a member of the yakuza. He bought an entire island for Haruka's birthday. He is against Haruka hanging around Yūto so much (and he often draws his sword when he suspects Yūto is "doing something hanky-panky" with Haruka), though he does not mind having Yūto around when he is alone. He heads the family's private paramilitary strike force unit known as The Hell Hounds.
Akiho Nogizaka (乃木坂 秋穂, Nogizaka Akiho)
Voiced by: Aya Hisakawa
Akiho is Haruka's and Mika's mother. Despite having given birth twice, she appears youthful and beautiful, so much so that Yūto originally thought she was Haruka's older sister or cousin when he first met her. She is the principal of a cooking school. She has a quiet and intellectual demeanor but has the strength to overcome her husband; in fact, she is referred to by Yūto and Mika as "The Nogizaka house's ultimate weapon". In contrast to her husband, she thinks it is good that Haruka and Yūto spend time together, and she likes to watch the development of their relationship by joining in on spying on them, although she is very strict that Haruka keeps up on her studies.
Ōki Nogizaka (乃木坂 王季, Nogizaka Ōki)
Voiced by: Rokurō Naya
Ōki is Haruka's and Mika's grandfather on their mother's side. He has a sociable personality and is a goodhearted old man. Although he is retired from his original position as the president of the Nogizaka's organization and now acts as a consultant, he is still a powerful man in the economic and political world. If he were to request it, all great leaders in the world would gather at one place for a high level conference within three hours. He has a shadow warrior named Heizō Sebastian, Hazuki Sakurazaka's grandfather.

==== Nogizaka family maids ====
The Nogizaka family maid team follows a ranking system. For some unspecified reason (and it seems that the Maid Team are too scared to discuss the topic with Yūto), the second highest ranking maid is missing.

Hazuki Sakurazaka (桜坂 葉月, Sakurazaka Hazuki)
Voiced by: Kaori Shimizu
Hazuki is the head maid of the Nogizaka family. She is mainly in charge of looking after Haruka and Mika, particularly Haruka; Hazuki acts in the way of an older sister towards her. She is generally very reserved and expressionless, but sometimes speaks in bombshell announcements. Hazuki adores cute things and even has a collection of stuffed animals. She often appears out of nowhere holding a chainsaw, her preferred weapon.
Nanami Nanashiro (七城 那波, Nanashiro Nanami)
Voiced by: Kana Ueda
Nanami is the third-highest ranking maid of the Nogizaka family, and she occasionally helps Hazuki with her work, but is more commonly found alongside Mika helping and joining in on her spying missions. She has a friendly personality and smiles a lot, though also has a wicked tongue. She is often seen wearing sunglasses. Like Hazuki, she also often appears out of nowhere, though holding a large hammer that looks like a meat tenderizer for a weapon. She has a habit of driving extremely fast (she drives the family Rolls-Royce Phantom like a WRC driver, though she sometimes drives the other Nogizaka limousine). Haruka states that she is a great driver when one is in a hurry.
Minamo Kusumoto (楠本 水面, Kusumoto Minamo)
Voiced by: Kaoru Mizuhara
Minamo is the fourth-highest ranking maid of the Nogizaka family and in charge of finances, legal, and public relations. Calm and refined in demeanor, she easily commands attention and respect. She is practically second in command and becomes the head maid in case something happens to Hazuki.
Maria Yukinohara (雪野原 鞠愛, Yukinohara Maria)
Voiced by: Megumi Takamoto
Maria is the fifth-highest ranking maid of the Nogizaka family. She does general work around the house, though she is mostly on the family medical treatment group.
Koayu Nagikawa (凪川 小鮎, Nagikawa Koayu)
Voiced by: Hiromi Igarashi
Koayu is the sixth-highest ranking maid of the Nogizaka family, and is the head chef. She is extremely shy, and does not appear often.
Ayame Rokujō (六条 菖蒲, Rokujō Ayame), Sara Rokujō (六条 沙羅, Rokujō Sara), Juri Rokujō (六条 樹里, Rokujō Juri)
Voiced by: Satomi Moriya (Ayame), Momoko Ishikawa (Sara), Sayuri Yahagi (Juri)
Ayame, Sara, and Juri are three sisters who are all equally ranked the seventh-highest maids of the Nogizaka family. They are the chauffeurs to the family. The eldest sister Ayame flies an eight-passenger airplane (the Nogizaka business jet, the Winter Shogun), which is comfortable to ride. Sara, the middle sister, is very speedy when flying her plane, or driving her limousine, or her Harrier jump jet. Juri, the youngest sister, also flies a plane.
Alistia Rein (アリスティア＝レイン, Arisutia＝Rein)
Voiced by: Rie Kugimiya
Alistia, otherwise known as Alice, is the eight-highest ranking maid of the Nogizaka family, and is in charge of VIP security and sabotage. She looks like a grade school student, and is a blond Caucasian (most likely German, since she once utters "Bruder", which means "brother", when addressing Yūto). She rarely speaks in the novel (being not yet skilled in Japanese), and normally converses with others via an array of nods and head-shakes to express her meanings (while uttering "koku"), but in the second series, she is revealed to have superb fighting skills with the attitude of a programmed hell-bent killer, as she was revealed by Hazuki to be the one in charge of VIP security and sabotage. She uses a spike-studded baseball bat, as well as spiked knuckles, as weapons.
Rio Munakata (宗像 理緒, Munakata Rio)
Voiced by: Yuka Iguchi
Rio is the ninth-highest ranking maid of the Nogizaka family and in charge of the chemistry department.
Iwai Hinasaki (雛咲 祝, Hinasaki Iwai)
Voiced by: Yoko Hikasa
Iwai is the tenth-highest ranking maid of the Nogizaka family and in charge of festivities. She also works as a real miko.

=== Other characters ===
Ruko Ayase (綾瀬 ルコ, Ayase Ruko)
Voiced by: Hitomi Nabatame
Ruko (black hair, ponytail) is Yūto's older sister. She works as a private secretary to a company president. She is skilled in karate and is a 2-dan. She is a hard worker on the job, but she drinks a lot at home and is unable to do any housework which makes Yūto in charge of all the chores. She generally has a rough attitude and will often speak in a brutish manner. Since her parents are absent so often, Ruko takes up the position as head of the house with her brother. When they first met, Ruko was very pleased with Haruka, something Yūto regarded as unusual. She is a weapon fanatic and owns many magazines about weapons. She also has her personal favorite Japanese blade called Ruri Dokuro, which means lapis lazuli skull. Her battle skills are considered to be at the professional fighter level. This is demonstrated when she, along with Yukari, completely broke the Tennōji's household security while looking for Yūto, when he had to stay one week for his butler part time job, just because they were hungry.
Milan Himemiya (姫宮 みらん, Himemiya Miran)
Voiced by: Hitomi Nabatame
Milan is a popular idol. Her posters and promotions for her song (which is the first anime adaptation's opening theme) are seen in the Comiket and in places around Akihabara. She is also working on the anime Nocturne Girls' School Lacrosse Club as a voice talent. She made Yūto her manager upon finding out her real manager was at the other end of Japan, and later tipped Yūto off as to Yayoi's true plans for Haruka.
Yayoi Kayahara (茅原 弥生, Kayahara Yayoi)
Voiced by: Yoko Hikasa
Yayoi is a talent agent who is Milan's manager and the organizer of an idol audition that Haruka was asked to participate in. The truth was, she really wanted Haruka to become an idol by any means necessary (the "idol audition" and the related processes all being fake, a ploy to draw Haruka in). Haruka was absolutely unaware of what Yayoi was planning.
Nozomi Kobayakawa (小早川 のぞみ, Kobayakawa Nozomi)
Voiced by: Kokoro Kikuchi
Nozomi is Yayoi's partner as a talent agent. She usually fetches Haruka from school to the "lesson".
Shute Sutherland (シュート・サザーランド, Shūto Sasaarando)
Voiced by: Junji Majima
Shute is the son of a wealthy family that is doing business with the Nogizaka family. He is an arrogant, selfish, and spoiled young man who, unlike his father, looks down upon common people. His arrogance often leads him into trouble that ends up humiliating him. During Haruka's birthday, he bullies Yūto and brags about his multimillion-dollar gifts while belittling Yūto's gift. He ends up humiliated when he handles Ōki Nogizaka by the collar of his shirt (not knowing who he is), and his father demands that he apologize to both him and Yūto in front of the distinguished crowd (Haruka ignored him anyway—she had just greeted him out of courtesy). He is later sent by his father to work as a butler "to teach him the value of humility", but to no avail. At the Year-End Maid and Butler Convention he earned punishment for himself for calling the assembled maids and butlers slaves and tools to people like him, stepping on the stuffed frog that Yūto had won for Alistia and subsequently spitting on her. Unbeknownst to him, his father was listening to the whole thing, and gave the butlers and maids to punish or beat him up as they saw fit.
Eri Tōgasaki (東ケ埼 瑛, Tōgasaki Eri)
Voiced by: Aki Toyosaki
Eri is one of Mika's friends and classmates. She is in the drama club together with Mika and is passionate about it. She has a gentle and kind personality.

=== Minor ===
Mahiro Asakura (朝倉 真尋, Asakura Mahiro)
Mahiro is Nobunaga's younger sister. She is referred by her brother as a hopeless person with a poor sense of direction. She views Nobunaga as an idiot older brother, though she does like Yūto. She dislikes her brother's otaku hobbies. She does not make an appearance in the anime.
Keiji Sendai (千代 啓二, Sendai Keiji)
Voiced by: Shintarō Asanuma (visual novel)
Keiji is Yūto's classmate; he is known as "mad dog". He calls himself a "natural enemy of Akiba-kei", though Yūto has seen him in Akihabara and at Comiket. He originally comes from Shaa's other manga series Menacing Dog's. He only cameos in the anime.
Setsuna Yatsusaki (八咲 せつな, Yatsusaki Setsuna)
Voiced by: Kana Hanazawa (visual novel)
Setsuna is a girl in Yūto's class; she is known as "faithful dog Hachikō". She is considerably clumsy. She has been seen by Yūto together with Keiji in Akihabara and at Comiket. Like Keiji, she originally comes from Menacing Dog's. She only cameos in the anime.

== Media ==
=== Light novels ===
Haruka Nogizaka's Secret began as a series of light novels written by Yūsaku Igarashi, and drawn by Shaa. The series originally started serialization in MediaWorks' now-defunct light novel magazine Dengeki hp with the release of volume 30 on June 18, 2004. A second chapter was published in volume 31 of the same magazine on August 21 of the same year. Less than two months later on October 10, the first bound volume of the series was published by ASCII Media Works under their Dengeki Bunko publishing imprint, and as of January 2012, 15 volumes have been published. The final volume was released on July 10, 2012. Additional chapters have also been published in Dengeki hp volumes: 34, 35, 41, and 47. The Mainichi Shimbun reported that as of January 2008, over 700,000 copies of the first seven volumes have been sold.

=== Manga ===
A manga adaptation illustrated by Yasuhiro Miyama was serialized in ASCII Media Works' seinen manga magazine Dengeki Moeoh between the October 2006 and August 2010 issues. Four tankōbon volumes were sold under ASCII Media Works' Dengeki Comics imprint from November 15, 2007, to November 27, 2010.

=== Audio dramas ===
A four-episode radio drama, which first aired on October 27, 2007, aired on ASCII Media Works' radio program Dengeki Taishō. An hour long drama CD which adds to the story from the second episode of the radio broadcast was released on January 10, 2008. The voices provided for both dramas were the same, and the same cast was used for the anime adaptation.

=== Anime ===
Haruka Nogizaka's Secret was adapted into a 12-episode anime adaptation, and was broadcast in Japan between July 3 and September 25, 2008, on the Chiba TV broadcasting network. The anime is produced by Studio Barcelona and directed by Munenori Nawa. Six DVD compilation volumes were released by Geneon Entertainment between September 26, 2008, and February 27, 2009. A Blu-ray disc box set of the series was released in Japan on September 26, 2009. The opening theme, "Tomadoi Bitter Tune" (とまどいビターチューン), is performed by Miran Himemiya and Chocolate Rockers. The ending theme, "Hitosashiyubi Quiet!" (ひとさしゆびクワイエット!), is performed by Kana Ueda, Mai Goto, Rina Satō, Kaori Shimizu and Mamiko Noto, the various voice actresses for the main characters of the anime collectively known as The N's.

A second anime series entitled Haruka Nogizaka's Secret: Purezza (乃木坂春香の秘密 ぴゅあれっつぁ♪, Nogizaka Haruka no Himitsu: Pyuarettsa) was directed by Munenori Nawa and produced by Studio Barcelona under the name Diomedéa. The second season aired 12 episodes between October 6 and December 22, 2009, in Japan. The opening theme is "Chōhatsu Cherry Heart" (挑発 Cherry Heart) by Milan Himemiya and Chocolate Rockers. The ending theme is "Himitsu Suishō! Uru to Love" (秘密推奨！うるとLOVE) by The N's.

A four-episode original video animation series titled Haruka Nogizaka's Secret: Finale was released between August 29 and November 28, 2012.

=== Video games ===
A visual novel based on the series for the PlayStation 2 developed by Vridge is published by ASCII Media Works and was released on September 25, 2008, in Japan entitled Haruka Nogizaka's Secret: Cosplay Hajimemashita (乃木坂春香の秘密 こすぷれ、はじめました♥).

A second video novel, also developed by Vridge and published by ASCII Media Works, is titled Haruka Nogizaka's Secret: Dōjinshi Hajimemashita (乃木坂春香の秘密 同人誌はじめました♥) and was originally released as a five-part digital download online playable on the PlayStation Portable on February 26, 2010. A Universal Media Disc version of the game was sold on October 28, 2010.
