= Korenande Shoukai =

Japanese children's TV series

- Genre: Variety show Educational Puppetry
- Created by: Kei Shimoyama
- Starring: Jay Kabira; Kazuki Enari; Takako Kitamura; Risa Yoshiki; Kana Asumi
- Opening theme: "What is This? What is That?"
- Country of origin: Japan
- Original language: Japanese
- No. of seasons: 6

Production
- Running time: 10 minutes

Original release
- Network: NHK Educational TV
- Release: 4 April 2016 – 31 March 2022

Korenande Shoukai (コレナンデ商会; literally "What-Is-This Company") is a Japanese children's musical puppet variety show that airs on NHK Educational TV. The setting is the general store "Korenande Shoukai". Each episode has a variety of sketches, songs, animation, and dialogue. The main characters include Jay, Kiwi, Bulbul, and Madanai. It debuted on 4 April 2016 and ended on 31 March 2022.

The show airs Monday through Friday from 7:35 a.m. to 7:45 a.m., and again on Tuesdays from 5:35 p.m. to 5:45 p.m. It currently airs on TV Japan on Mondays through Fridays from 8:50 a.m. to 9:00 a.m. where it is known as Chatty Jay's Sundry Shop. This show was also on aired on Sundays from April in 2018 to March in 2021.

== Premise ==
As a variety show, each episode is a stand-alone sketch and follows roughly the same pattern: Jay will bring an interesting item into the shop, and Bulbul and Kiwi will ask about it. The episode will then focus on the particular item, such as an old-fashioned iron, or a ship in the bottle, as Jay explains what the item is, how to use it, or where it came from. The episodes also contain two or three songs. The songs are sometimes sung in the shop, but other times the camera shifts locations or the show completely switches to animation (usually a watercolor style). Songs may be directly related to the object being discussed, such as "Happy End" during the episode where Jay brings in a laughing bag, but mostly they are just fun and catchy songs, such as "I Want to Be an Idol".

The show also features a variety of short segments which are not present in every episode. Examples include "Korenandapedia" where a voice-over that gives the encyclopedic information for the episode's interesting item, and "Nodo Jii Man" which depicts the super hero Nodo Jii Man (Bulbul) who fights using the power of music with the help of his sidekick Nodo Pink (Kiwi).

== Characters ==
Jay (Jay Kabira)
One of the only actual people in the show, Jay is the manager of Korenande Shoukai and he's always seen wearing a tawny brown hat as well as a brown apron with a blue square in the center and a light blue square on the bottom, a light gray shirt, light gray pants, and a yellow bowtie. He is carefree and easygoing. When the show features a musical number, Jay often plays the bongos, sansen, drums, banjo, electric guitar, tambourine, or ukulele while singing. Because of his eclectic tastes, there are many old things at Korenande Shoukai that Jay will periodically rediscover and bring out for an episode. Jay also often acts as narrator during different parts of the show, telling a story in an amusing way. His name is derived from the English word for the bird of the same name.
Bulbul (Kazuki Enari)
Bulbul is a shop assistant of Korenande Shoukai. He has yellow hair, wears clothes with a blue triangle, and lives in a house that is a five minute walk from the shop (two minutes if he runs). His personality is the exact opposite of Jay's, so he is prone to worry and can also act timid or cowardly. Despite this, he shares with Jay a desire to be the star of the show and a love of music. For musical numbers, Bulbul is a master of the piano and often sings while playing. He is also a fan of the idol group BCG47. His ultimate dream is to one day take over Jay's position as manager of Korenande Shoukai. Bulbul's name is derived from the English word for the bird of the same name.
Turkey (Takako Kitamura)
She is the home delivery worker who belongs to Hemoguro bin. She is very energish woman. Her name is derived from the English word for the bird of the same name.
Kiwi (Risa Yoshiki)
Kiwi is a girl who lives in the same neighborhood as Korenande Shoukai and frequently visits Jay and Bulbul. She has distinctive bright pink hair worn in a ponytail and wears a bright yellow long sleeved dress with red circles on it and bright yellow gloves. She is brimming with curiosity and is always interested in the odd things she can find in the Korenande Shoukai. She can also be quite cheeky, especially towards Bulbul. Her dream is to become a famous singer, and while at Korenande Shoukai she often plays rhythm instruments, the drums, or the electric guitar while singing during musical numbers. Though it hasn't been confirmed, she is sometimes seen with a pink backpack that implies she is an elementary school student, however she has ear piercings and is depicted wearing lipstick. Kiwi's name is derived from the English word for the bird of the same name.
Madanai (Kana Asumi)
When Jay found this small cat figure that had been thrown away, he brought her back to Korenande Shoukai. She is now the shop's maneki neko, or lucky cat. She sits on a shelf and doesn't speak much, but she often mutters to herself and will frequently appear at the very end of the show. She has a calm and level-headed personality and is a wealth of knowledge. Her favorite things are fish and chicken. Madanai's name comes from a line in the novel entitled "I Am A Cat" by Natsume Soseki. The particular line is read "Namae wa mada nai." translated as "I don't yet have a name."
Mice (Unnamed)
There are two mice named Sunday and Nanday who live in the shop and sing chorus during musical numbers. Even if they can not be seen, sometimes their voices can still be heard in the background.

== Original songs ==
Many of the songs used in the show tie directly into a particular episode. Even after that episode has aired, the song may be used again in subsequent episodes as a way of filling time. Some of them are in the CD and DVD.

- What is This? What is That? [アレナンデコレナンデ] (theme song)
- Birds are clever [鳥はえらい]
- Seven gods [七人の神様]
- Mag Cup Song [マグカップの歌]
- I made it [やったね]
- Dice [サイコロ]
- Make up [メイクアップ]
- It's ok [いいじゃん]
- Introducing Korenande Shoukai [コレナンデ商会の自己紹介]
- Farewell to Snacks [さらばおやつよ]
- Time to Eat [イタダキマス]
- Let's wash your clothes [せんたくしましょ]
- What Color is the Sky [空はなにいろ]
- I Want to Be an Idol [アイドルになりたい]
- Let's See a Good Dream [いい夢見よう]
- Happy End [ハッピーエンド]
- I Like Books [本が好き]
- The song of books [本のうた]
- Face [かお]
- You Can Do It!
- Loving Doughnuts [恋するドーナツ]
- Enormous Dream [でっかい夢]
- Dog [いぬ]
- To Grandpa [おじいちゃんへ]
- Let's Meet at the Sea [海であいましょう]
- Like Mary Poppins [メリーポピンズのように]
- Upper Sky [うわのそら]
- The World Spins Around Me [地球はボクがまわしてる]
- The Song Singing About Free-time [ひまな時に歌う歌]
- The Maneki Neko Samba [まねきねこのサンバ]
- Eat Properly [よくかんでたべなさい]
- Iron so hot [アイロン・アッチッチ]
- make Rap [ラップをかける]
- Cute Photogenic [かわいいフォトジェニック]
- Life of a Dinosaur [恐竜のせいかつ]
- Sighing Bossa Nova [ため息のボサノバ]
- Together [いっしょだね]
- Keep a Secret Song [秘密を守る歌]
- Losing the Way [まよってるんば]
- Zodiac Tango [十二支のタンゴ]
- Various Bonba [イロイロボンバ]
- Let's Write a Character [字をかこう]
- For a Little Bit More [夕陽のGAMAN]
- Jungle Expedition [ジャングル探検]
- Guiro-guiro [ギロギロ]
- cooking [クッキング]
- six legs' rock in roll [六本足のロックンロール]

== Production ==
- Creator - Kei Shimoyama
- Music - Satoru Shionoya
- Choreography - Kenichi Honma
- Puppeteers - Haruka Yamada, Keiko Kajima
- Art Directors - Ryuuji Fujieda, Machiko Miroko
- Production Company - 81 Produce
- Studio - NHK
