= Akiko Kobayashi (voice actress) =

Japanese voice actress and singer

- Born: June 9, 1979 (age 47); Yokohama, Kanagawa, Japan
- Occupations: Voice actress Singer

Akiko Kobayashi (小林 晃子, Kobayashi Akiko; born June 9, 1979 in Yokohama, Kanagawa Prefecture) is a Japanese voice actress and singer.

== Filmography ==
=== Television animation ===
2001

- Parappa the Rapper (Paula)
- Angel Tales (Tanuki no Midori)

2002

- Digimon Frontier (Nyaromon)
- Shin Megami Tensei Devil Children: Light & Dark (Ishitoku)

2003

- Tenshi no Shippo Chu! (Raccoon Midori)

2004

- Legendz: Yomigaeru Ryuuou Densetsu (Dr. Conrad)
- The Marshmallow Times (Basil)
- Get Ride! Amdriver (June Frum)

2005

- Pandalian (Diddy, Bingo)
- Onegai My Melody (Nyanmi)
- Zettai Shonen (Kisa Tanigawa)
- Ginga Densetsu Weed (Mel)

2006

- Ballad of a Shinigami (Momo)
- Onegai My Melody: Kuru Kuru Shuffle! (Nyanmi)
- Inukami! (Tenso)
- Save Me! Lollipop (Zura)
- Fairy Musketeers (Randagio)
- Galaxy Angel Rune (Mimoret)
- Lovedol ~Lovely Idol~ (Hibiki Asami)

2007

- Onegai My Melody: Sukkiri (Nyanmi)

2008

- Onegai My Melody: Kirara (Nyanmi)

2009

- Cookin' Idol I! My! Mine! (Misan)
- Jewelpet (Aojiso)
