= Menacing Dog's =

Japanese manga series

- Menacing Dog's: Another Secret first volume cover art

キョウハクDOG's (Kyōhaku Dog's)
- Genre: Romantic comedy
- Manga
- Written by: Shaa
- Published by: MediaWorks; ASCII Media Works
- English publisher: NA: Infinity Studios; Kadokawa (digital)
- Imprint: Dengeki Comics
- Magazine: Dengeki Teioh; Dengeki G's Festival! Comic
- English magazine: Comic Walker (digital)
- Original run: November 2005 – January 2012
- Volumes: 4
- Related work
- Haruka Nogizaka's Secret

Menacing Dog's (Japanese: キョウハクDOG's, Hepburn: Kyōhaku Dog's) is a Japanese manga series written and illustrated by Shaa, the same illustrator of the Haruka Nogizaka's Secret light novel series. The manga was originally serialized in MediaWorks' Dengeki Teioh magazine, but after the magazine became defunct, it began serialization in Dengeki G's Festival! Comic, renamed Menacing Dog's: Another Secret (キョウハクDOG's -Another Secret-, Kyōhaku Dog's -Another Secret-). The manga was serialized in the two magazines between the November 2005 and January 2012 issues. A total of four tankōbon volumes were published under the Dengeki Comics imprint. Infinity Studios licensed Menacing Dog's in North America, and Menacing Dog's: Another Secret's chapters are digitally serialized in English on Kadokawa's Comic Walker website.

== Plot ==
Keiji Sendai has an image to maintain, as he is the school's most notorious delinquent, but one day a klutzy and innocent girl called Setsuna Yatsusaki discovers his deepest and darkest secret, about that he is a hardcore otaku. Realizing his predicament, Setsuna knows he is willing to do anything to keep his secret, so she blackmails him into being her own slave, and tries to train him as her pet dog.

== Characters ==
Keiji Sendai (千代 啓二, Sendai Keiji)
Voiced by: Shintarō Asanuma (PS2 game)
Keiji is the main protagonist of Menacing Dog's. He is a notorious delinquent, and is referred to as the "mad dog". Despite being a delinquent, he is also an otaku, though he tries his best to maintain his secret. This secret is found out by Setsuna, who then makes him her pet dog. Keiji appears in Haruka Nogizaka's Secret's PlayStation 2 visual novel.
Setsuna Yatsusaki (八咲 せつな, Yatsusaki Setsuna)
Voiced by: Kana Hanazawa (PS2 game)
Referred to as "faithful dog Hachiko", Setsuna is a cute and shy girl who is quite the klutz, but despite her innocent nature, she is slightly sadistic, blackmailing Keiji into being her pet dog when she discovers his secret. Setsuna makes cameo appearances in the Haruka Nogizaka's Secret anime, and PlayStation 2 visual novel.
Kei Sendai (千代 慧, Sendai Kei)
Keiji's younger sister who attends kindergarten, Kei likes to tease her older brother.
Yutori Yatsusaki (八咲 ゆとり, Yatsusaki Yutori)
The sister of Setsuna.
Three Idiots (三馬鹿, Sanbaka)
Three underlings of Keiji.
Nobunaga Asakura (朝倉 信長, Asakura Nobunaga)
A geek in the same class as Keiji, he is a supporting character in Haruka Nogizaka's Secret.
Yūto Ayase (綾瀬 裕人, Ayase Yūto)
Friend of Nobunaga, he is the main character in the Haruka Nogizaka's Secret series.
Yukari Kamishiro (上代 由香里, Kamishiro Yukari)
The homeroom teacher, she is a supporting character in Haruka Nogizaka's Secret.

== Volumes ==
=== Menacing Dog's ===
No.	Original release date	Original ISBN	North American release date	North American ISBN
1	October 27, 2005	4-8402-2969-4	December 12, 2007	978-1596970519

=== Menacing Dog's: Another Secret ===
No.	Release date	ISBN
1	January 27, 2012	978-4-04-886277-6
2	January 27, 2012	978-4-04-886278-3
3	March 27, 2013	978-4-04-891437-6

== Merchandise ==
A figure of the character Setsuna was sculpted by an artist called Hatsumi, and produced by a company called Clayz. It was released in December 2006. Postcard collections featuring Menacing Dog's characters were also released.
