= Shoko Hamada (entertainer) =

Japanese model and tarento

- 後藤 真希
- Born: January 1, 1986 (age 40); Kyotango, Kyoto, Japan
- Occupations: gravure idol; race queen
- Height: 157 cm (5 ft 2 in)
- Spouse: Kabukin (m. 2020)
- Children: 2

Shoko Hamada (浜田 翔子, Hamada Shōko; born January 1, 1986) is a Japanese tarento, gravure idol and race queen. In addition, she has released several music CDs, mostly containing cover versions. She also worked for professional wrestling promotion Hustle in 2006, making her debut on September 7 along with fellow tarento Hitomi Kaikawa. She most well known for her appearance as a poster in Metal Gear Solid 3: Snake Eater and its remake Metal Gear Solid Delta: Snake Eater.

== Personal life ==
On June 29, 2020, she married YouTuber Kabukin. She gave birth to her first baby boy in 2021 and second baby boy in 2024.

== Works ==
=== DVDs ===
- [2003.03.25] Strawberry
- [2004.07.23] Lolita Race Queen
- [2004.09.15] Endless 2004
- [2004.09.24] Silky Collection ~Se-Onna!~ Hamada Shouko
- [2004.11.26] Race Queen no Joshintachi Hamada Shouko
- [2005.01.26] Idol Complete 2005 Winter Blue
- [2005.02.25] Love! Hamasho

=== Photobooks ===
- [2004.07.23] Lolita Race Queen

=== Music CDs ===
- [2006.11.8] Cosplay Trance Utaemashoko!
- [2007.3.21] Cosplay Trance Odorimashoko!
- [2007.7.18] Hamatra Moriagarimashoko!
- [2007.10.3] Hamasho Album Oteate Shimashoko!
- [2008.3.26] Jaa Ne (cover version of the Onyanko Club song)

=== TV Dramas ===
- [2006.4.27~2006.6.22] Shinigami no Ballad 1-6

=== Games ===
- Hamada appears on a poster in Metal Gear Solid 3: Snake Eater, at the Locker Room in the Eastern Weapons Wing of Groznyj Grad. she would appear again in the Remake with an updated photo
