= K-Ske Hasegawa =

Japanese writer

K-Ske Hasegawa (ハセガワ ケイスケ, Hasegawa Keisuke, born December 26) is a male Japanese light novelist from Fukui, Japan. In June 2003, he made his debut with the Ballad of a Shinigami series of light novel and has gone on to create several other works. He enjoys listening to the bands Bump of Chicken, The Pillows, Number Girl, and Zazen Boys, among others, and makes references to song lyrics produced by these bands in his work.

== Works ==
- Ballad of a Shinigami
- Bludgeoning Angel Dokuro-Chan desu (collaboration)
- Jii-chan Jet!!
- Mizutama Panic.
