= Yūsaku Igarashi =

Japanese writer

Yūsaku Igarashi (五十嵐 雄策, Igarashi Yūsaku, born October 3) is a Japanese writer of light novels. In 2003 Igarashi won the Grand Prize in the fourth Dengeki hp Novella Prize held by MediaWorks for his novella Shiawase Nisei Taidōkyo Keikaku: Yōsei-san no Ohanashi. The following year in 2004, Igarashi debuted with his light novel series Nogizaka Haruka no Himitsu. His hobbies include playing the piano, and cooking. He is also the author for the light novel series Hanikami Triangle.
