= Munenori Nawa =

Japanese anime director

Munenori Nawa (名和宗則, Nawa Munenori) is a Japanese animator, storyboard artist, and director.

== Anime involved in ==
- Metal Fighter Miku: Key Animation
- Tenchi Universe: Key Animation (ep 12)
- Slayers Gorgeous: Assistant Animation Director
- Digimon: The Movie: Key Animation
- Shrine of the Morning Mist: Animation director (ep 5)
- Da Capo: Second Season: Director
- Galaxy Angel A: Animation director
- Galaxy Angel Z: Animation director
- Otoboku: Maidens Are Falling For Me!: Director
- Nanatsuiro Drops: Storyboard (eps 4,8), Episode Director (ep 8)
- Nogizaka Haruka no Himitsu: Director
- Nogizaka Haruka no Himitsu: Purezza: Director
- Kissxsis: Director
- Fortune Arterial: Akai Yakusoku: Director
- R-15: Director
- Nakaimo - My Sister Is Among Them!: Director
- Locodol: Director
- Pandora in the Crimson Shell: Ghost Urn: Director
- Kin-iro Mosaic: Thank You!!: Director
