= Bludgeoning Angel Dokuro-chan =

Light novel series

- Cover of the first light novel featuring Dokuro Mitsukai (right), Shizuki Minakami and Sakura Kusakabe (left)

撲殺天使ドクロちゃん (Bokusatsu Tenshi Dokuro-chan)
- Genre: Dark comedy; Magical girl
- Light novel
- Written by: Masaki Okayu
- Illustrated by: Torishimo
- Published by: MediaWorks
- Imprint: Dengeki Bunko
- Magazine: Dengeki hp
- Original run: June 2003 – October 2007
- Volumes: 11
- Manga
- Written by: Mitsuna Sakuse
- Illustrated by: Mitsuna Ouse
- Published by: MediaWorks
- Magazine: Dengeki Comic Gao!
- Original run: August 2004 – June 2006
- Volumes: 3
- Original video animation
- Directed by: Tsutomu Mizushima
- Produced by: Kōhei Kawano; Takaya Ibira; Kazuma Miki; Atsushi Wada
- Written by: Tsutomu Mizushima
- Music by: Kaoru Akizuki
- Studio: Hal Film Maker
- Licensed by: AUS: Universal/Sony; NA: Discotek Media
- Released: March 12, 2005 – September 10, 2005
- Episodes: 4
- Video game

It's a Game Now! Dokuro-chan: Great Health Diagnosis Strategy
- Developer: Idea Factory
- Publisher: IF Mate
- Genre: Visual novel
- Platform: PlayStation 2
- Released: November 10, 2005
- Manga

Bludgeoning Angel Dokuro-chan Ripiru
- Written by: Mitsuna Sakuse
- Illustrated by: Kasumu Kirino
- Published by: MediaWorks
- Magazine: Dengeki Maoh
- Original run: October 2006 – October 2008
- Volumes: 3
- Original video animation

Bludgeoning Angel Dokuro-chan Second
- Directed by: Tsutomu Mizushima
- Produced by: Kōhei Kawano; Takaya Ibira; Kazuma Miki; Atsushi Wada
- Written by: Tsutomu Mizushima
- Music by: Kaoru Akizuki
- Studio: Hal Film Maker
- Licensed by: AUS: Universal/Sony; NA: Discotek Media
- Released: August 11, 2007 – November 10, 2007
- Episodes: 2

Bludgeoning Angel Dokuro-chan (Japanese: 撲殺天使ドクロちゃん, Hepburn: Bokusatsu Tenshi Dokuro-chan) is a Japanese light novel series written by Masaki Okayu and illustrated by Torishimo. It centers on a teenage boy and a killer angel from the future who constantly gets him into trouble and kills him violently and repeatedly, often removing his head with her spiked club named "Excaliborg", only to resurrect him seconds later. The novels were first serialized in the Dengeki hp magazine published by MediaWorks. Later, a manga version was created, written and illustrated by Mitsuna Ouse serialized in Dengeki Comic Gao!. Finally, an anime version was adapted and aired in Japan between March and September 2005. A second anime series aired between August and November 2007. In late 2005, a PlayStation 2 game titled Game ni Natta yo! Dokuro-chan: Kenkō Shindan Daisakusen was released in Japan.

== Plot ==
Bludgeoning Angel Dokuro-chan tells the story of 14-year-old junior high schooler Sakura Kusakabe, who twenty years in the future develops a technology that causes all women to stop physically aging after they reach twelve years old in an attempt to create a "Lolicon's World". However, this act accidentally creates immortality amongst humans, thus offending God. Dokuro Mitsukai, a member of an order of assassin angels that are called Lulutie, has been sent from the future to kill him. Believing that Sakura can be redeemed, Dokuro decides instead to keep Sakura so occupied and distracted that he can never develop the immortality technology. In response to her reluctance to complete the assassination mission, Sabato, another assassin of the Lulutie order, is dispatched to ensure the mandate of God is carried out. Using her feminine wiles along with her electric baton as her weapons of choice, Sabato seeks to kill Sakura herself and Dokuro is forced to oppose her. In so doing, Dokuro pits herself against the will of Heaven itself in order to protect him.

Ironically, she herself quite possibly poses a greater threat to his well-being as a result of her capricious and highly volatile personality. Due to her impulsive nature and super-human strength, she often carelessly or unthinkingly kills him with her massive spiked kanabō (club), Excalibolg, only to regret it moments later and return him to life with angelic power accompanied by her whimsical personal chant of "Pipiru-piru-piru-pipiru-pii". This repeated trauma, along with myriad other problems she causes for him, prompts Sakura to ultimately question whether her "protection" is worth it and ponder that it might be ultimately preferable to simply allow Sabato to kill him permanently and put an end to his perpetual misery.

== Characters ==
Sakura Kusakabe (草壁 桜, Kusakabe Sakura)
Voiced by: Reiko Takagi (Japanese); Johnny Yong Bosch (English)
Sakura is a 14-year-old second-year junior high school student whose life changed the day the "Bludgeoning Angel" Dokuro-chan appeared. Since then his life has become one of her gory clubbings and resurrections. This has come about because some time in the future, Sakura is apparently destined to create a technology that stops girls from aging after they reach the age of twelve years. Dokuro, an angel assassin, is sent back in time to prevent this by killing him. She fails to do so because she falls in love with him. Sakura's life is still in danger because a second angel assassin has been sent back in time to ensure his elimination. Due to having two young heart-breakingly beautiful angels attracted to him, Sakura gains a reputation as a lolicon at school (though this is only because the male population are jealous of him). While not perverted by nature, Sakura finds himself in tricky situations with Dokuro and her sister, Zakuro. Sakura has a crush on his classmate and childhood friend, Shizuki Minakami, who he spends much of his time with but is too afraid to confess his feelings. Despite gradually developing feelings for Dokuro, despite the way she treats him, Sakura continues to pursue Shizuki, even going on a date with her which fails when Dokuro and Sabato intervene. He is indecisive, and he is unable to choose between Shizuki and Dokuro even towards the end of the series. But after suffering Dokuro's volatile personality and the "protection" she brings, he begins to think Shizuki is the better option.

Dokuro Mitsukai (三塚井 ドクロ, Mitsukai Dokuro)
Voiced by: Saeko Chiba (Japanese); Wendee Lee (English)
Dokuro is a permanently 12-year-old bludgeoning angel of Lulutie (a committee of angels that protect the domain of God) from the future sent back in time to kill Sakura Kusakabe, but decides to save him instead after falling in love with him. As a result, Dokuro vows to stay by his side to protect him from any dangers which may appear. She wields the magical spiked club (kanabō), "Excalibolg", with which she clubs her victims, or to express her displeasure (almost exclusively Sakura). Dokuro has super-human strength and endurance (because of this she often underestimates her own strength and unintentionally harms Sakura), and is also capable of bringing anyone back to life with Excalibolg by chanting "Pipiru piru piru pipiru pii". She can, and does, use her magic to cause humans to transform into animals or to completely erase them from existence, mainly as an excuse to pair up with Sakura. When she is not brutally killing Sakura she teases him mercilessly, mostly using sexual innuendo. Eventually, she founds a school club dedicated to watching wood glue dry, after gaining a teacher's approval using some sort of torture involving "the nerves of your teeth". She promptly coerces Sakura into becoming its second member (by sticking him onto a board and leaving him there until he joins) and has stated her desire to achieve the national championship in this particular 'sport'. As of the second season, Dokuro has become more "comfortable" with Sakura seeing her nude. Every sentence Dokuro says ends in "dayo".

Sabato Mihashigo (三橋檎 サバト, Mihashigo Sabato)
Voiced by: Rie Kugimiya (Japanese); Laura Bailey (English) (credited as Elle Deets)
Sabato is another permanently 12-year-old angel sent from the future to assassinate Sakura before he can create his "Lolicon's World". Also with super-human strength, she has sheep horns on her head. Since her defeat, Sabato lives in a small cardboard box under a bridge. Her living allowance comes from an unknown source. Her weapon is the deadly shock-baton, "Durandal" (in which she can "char blue whales in the blink of an eye"). It is later revealed that her mother is Babel Mihashigo, the chairman of Lulutie and the main instigator of the operation to kill Sakura. Sabato is not allowed to return home until she kills Sakura. Even though Dokuro and Sabato have opposite aims, they are actually friends and hang out together when not fighting over Sakura. Every sentence Sabato says ends in "desu".

Zansu (ザンス, Zansu)
Voiced by: Nobuo Tobita (Japanese); Kirk Thornton (English)
Zansu is yet another angel from the future who accompanied Dokuro in the attempt to save Sakura's life. His appearance is very odd, looking more like a member of a biker gang. Unlike the other angels, Zansu is often on the receiving end of the stick whenever he makes an appearance around Sakura. His trademark pink Mohawk is his most defining trait. It is later revealed that he has a hidden camera in it which he uses to take erotic pictures of Zakuro. He is, unfortunately, revealed to have some perverted tendencies and in the second series is frequently nude. Every sentence Zansu says ends in "Zansu". Sakura describes him as a "has-been death metal punk" and a "lolicon."

Zakuro Mitsukai (三塚井 ザクロ, Mitsukai Zakuro)
Voiced by: Akeno Watanabe (Japanese); Dorothy Fahn (English)
Zakuro is a tall 9 year-old angel with a far larger bust than her older sister, Dokuro. She has the super-human powers of most angels and wears a naval officer's uniform, as well as an eyepatch on her left eye for unknown reasons. Zakuro is unusually polite, addressing people with the formal "-san" suffix after their names rather than the informal "-kun" or "-chan". Calm and soft-spoken, she is quite proficient in battle. Her weapon is a wet towel called "Eckilsax" which can split into two or more for close combat, as well as stretching itself to bind opponents. In the second series, she moves in with Sakura and Dokuro. Zakuro seems to get on well with Sakura and appears to have a crush on him, although she sometimes suggests that Dokuro kill Sakura only to realize what she's saying and apologize (but is usually too late by then).

Shizuki Minakami (水上 静希, Minakami Shizuki)
Voiced by: Ayako Kawasumi (Japanese); Melanie Wagner (English)
Shizuki is 14 years old and one of Sakura's classmates as well as his childhood friend. Much like the rest of Sakura's classmates, Shizuki is unfazed by the chaos which the angels introduce. It is noteworthy however that while Sakura's classmates think that he is a lolicon and treat him with contempt and jealousy, Shizuki believes him to be a good person and is the only character to stick by him amongst the chaos. Shizuki seems to have a crush on Sakura but is unable to confess her feelings to him (just like he cannot confess to her). She is a bit jealous of Dokuro because of how much attention Sakura gives her (mostly out of responsibility for her actions) but seems to care about her all the same.

== Media ==
=== Light novels ===
Dokuro-chan first began as a light novel series originally created by Masaki Okayu and illustrated by Torishimo was first serialized in the Japanese manga magazine Dengeki hp published by MediaWorks. There are ten individual light novels in the series.

- Bludgeoning Angel Dokuro-chan ISBN 4-8402-2392-0
- Bludgeoning Angel Dokuro-chan 2 ISBN 4-8402-2490-0
- Bludgeoning Angel Dokuro-chan 3 ISBN 4-8402-2637-7
- Bludgeoning Angel Dokuro-chan 4 ISBN 4-8402-2784-5
- Bludgeoning Angel Dokuro-chan 5 ISBN 4-8402-2994-5
- Bludgeoning Angel Dokuro-chan 6 ISBN 4-8402-3143-5
- Bludgeoning Angel Dokuro-chan 7 ISBN 4-8402-3343-8
- Bludgeoning Angel Dokuro-chan 8 ISBN 4-8402-3548-1
- Bludgeoning Angel Dokuro-chan 9 ISBN 978-4-8402-3756-7
- Bludgeoning Angel Dokuro-chan 10 ISBN 978-4-8402-4030-7

There is also a single volume of short stories written by other popular light novel authors.

- Bludgeoning Angel Dokuro-chan desu ISBN 4-8402-3443-4
  - Stories by Tsutomu Mizushima, Nagaru Tanigawa, Toshihiko Tsukiji, Keiichi Sigsawa, K-Ske Hasegawa, Ryohgo Narita, and Kazuma Kamachi.
  - Illustrated by Clamp, Hekiru Hikawa, Noizi Ito, Eeji Komatsu, Akio Watanabe, Shaa, and Kanna Wakatsuki.

=== Manga ===
The manga version of Dokuro-chan, written by Mitsuna Sakuse and illustrated by Mitsuna Ouse, was first serialised in the magazine Dengeki Comic Gao! published by MediaWorks.

=== Anime ===
The first season of the Dokuro-chan anime first aired in Japan on March 12, 2005, and contained eight episodes in length. Each of the eight episodes is less than 15 minutes in duration, though they were aired in pairs which totaled four parts that were each 25 minutes in length including the opening and ending songs. The second season of Dokuro-chan anime first aired on August 11, 2007, with a DVD box set release date of August 24, 2007. The second season ran for four episodes, and is released in two parts consisting of two episodes each. In the TV airings, some of the more violent or dubious scenes are replaced with an image of a beach and one of the students that were transformed into animals, leaving just the audio. New changes were made with the second season, such as Dokuro's hair color changing to blue, Zakuro moving in with them both, the only appearance of Sabato's mother, and the animation being slightly different from the first season.

Two pieces of theme music were used for both anime seasons; one opening theme and one ending theme each. The first season's opening theme is "Bokusatsu Tenshi Dokuro-chan", and the ending theme is "Survive", both sung by Saeko Chiba. The second season's opening theme is "Bokusatsu Tenshi Dokuro-chan (2007)", and the ending theme is "Bokusatsu Ondo de Dokuro-chan", again both by Saeko Chiba.

Media Blasters acquired the license of both Bokusatsu Tenshi Dokuro-chan and Bokusatsu Tenshi Dokuro-chan 2 on June 10, 2008. The series is licensed as Bludgeoning Angel Dokuro-chan, translating the "Bokusatsu Tenshi" from the title as "Bludgeoning Angel". Dokuro-chan was released on September 30, 2008, as an English-subtitled release, and a bilingual English-dubbed "Smashing Special Edition" was released on June 18, 2010. Discotek Media re-licensed the series in 2019 and it will be released on Blu-ray Disc on January 28, 2020.

==== Bludgeoning Angel Dokuro-chan ====
No.	Title	Original release date
1a	"It's a Bludgeoning Angel! Dokuro-chan!"; Transliteration: "Bokusatsu Tenshi da yo! Dokuro-chan!" (Japanese: 撲殺天使だよ!ドクロちゃん!)	March 12, 2005
Sakura has to adjust to Dokuro, her killings, his classmates wailing on him, and trying to maintain his sanity.
1b	"An Assassin from the Future! Dokuro-chan!"; Transliteration: "Mirai kara no Shikaku da yo! Dokuro-chan!" (Japanese: 未来からの刺客だよ!ドクロちゃん!)	March 12, 2005
Sakura meets Sabato where she and Dokuro finally explain why they have been sent to assassinate him.
2a	"Cupid of Love! Dokuro-chan!"; Transliteration: "Koi no Kyūpitto da yo! Dokuro-chan!" (Japanese: 恋のキューピットだよ!ドクロちゃん!)	May 14, 2005
Sakura and Shizuki help Miyamoto have a get together with his secret admirer. Sakura has recurring visions of Gregor.
2b	"It's New Cinema Paradise! Dokuro-chan!"; Transliteration: "Nyū Shinema Paradaisu da yo! Dokuro-chan!" (Japanese: ニューシネマパラダイスだよ!ドクロちゃん!)	May 14, 2005
Sakura and Shizuki go to the movies for a date, but things go awry when Dokuro follows and when Sabato remakes an appearance.
3a	"It's an Outdoors School! Dokuro-chan!"; Transliteration: "Rinkangakkō da yo! Dokuro-chan!" (Japanese: 林間学校だよ!ドクロちゃん!)	July 16, 2005
The class goes on a camping trip where Sakura tries to impress Shizuki, but tries not to be killed by Dokuro for various reasons.
3b	"It's a Test of Courage! Dokuro-chan!"; Transliteration: "Kimodameshi da yo! Dokuro-chan!" (Japanese: 肝試しだよ!ドクロちゃん!)	July 16, 2005
The class goes on a test of courage through a dark forest to reach a mountain peak. With Shizuki getting lost in the forest, Sakura tries to search for her.
4a	"It's Zakuro-chan! Dokuro-chan!"; Transliteration: "Zakuro-chan da yo! Dokuro-chan!" (Japanese: ザクロちゃんだよ!ドクロちゃん!)	September 10, 2005
Sakura meets Zakuro where she explains that she needs to take Dokuro back to the future.
4b	"It's Goodbye! Dokuro-chan!"; Transliteration: "Sayonara da yo! Dokuro-chan!" (Japanese: さよならだよ!ドクロちゃん!)	September 10, 2005
Sakura is left with a choice if he wants Dokuro to stay with him or not.

==== Bludgeoning Angel Dokuro-chan Second ====
No.	Title	Original release date
1a	"It's a Sketching Contest! Dokuro-chan!"; Transliteration: "Shasei taikaida yo! Dokuro-chan!" (Japanese: しゃせい大会だよ! ドクロちゃん!)	August 11, 2007
Sakura, Dokuro and Shizuki are on a school trip where they are asked to draw the scenery, but not without Dokuro harassing him most of the time.
1b	"It's a Bubble and Scrubbing Battle! Dokuro-chan!"; Transliteration: "Bukubuku goshigoshi dai sakusenda yo! Dokuro-chan!" (Japanese: ぶくぶくごしごし大作戦だよ! ドクロちゃん!)	August 11, 2007
After Dokuro and Zakuro are scared of a "monster" they read about in a myth book, they then want (and force) Sakura to join them in the bath.
2a	"Incidents Happen in a Secret Room! Dokuro-chan!"; Transliteration: "Jiken wa misshitsu de okoru yo! Dokuro-chan!" (Japanese: 事件は密室で起こるよ! ドクロちゃん!)	November 10, 2007
Sabato's mother informs everyone that Sabato has to return to the future, but Sakura tries to stop her from leaving, thus everyone ends up in a prison cell. Many attempts to escape go very wrong.
2b	"It's Valentine's Day Kiss! Dokuro-chan!"; Transliteration: "Barentaindē kissuda yo! Dokuro-chan!" (Japanese: バレンタインデー・キッスだよ! ドクロちゃん!)	November 10, 2007
Dokuro makes Sakura chocolate, shaped of himself, for Valentine's Day. However, she adds a special "sensitive sausage" which makes Sakura really "special" and also gives him an allergic reaction. Zansu, Dokuro, and Zakuro then try to help him overcome the allergy, but all are unknown to the fact that Zansu may have a bigger goal in mind.

=== Video game ===
Game ni Natta yo! Dokuro-chan ~ Kenkou Shindan Daisakusen

In late 2005, a video game based on the series titled It's a Game Now! Dokuro-chan: Great Health Diagnosis Strategy (ゲームになったよ! ドクロちゃん〜健康診断大作戦〜, Game ni Natta yo! Dokuro-chan: Kenkō Shindan Daisakusen) was released in Japan. The game was given an 18+ rating from CERO, because of highly disturbing violence and nudity. The game was re-rated as "D" (17+) on their website since this game was released while the "D" rating was not created. In the game, Sakura meets a new angel named Benomu. The game is set up as a visual novel where the player has to pick which opinions to go with. This game features the affection system, where the main character Sakura has to spend time with one of the six girls to maximize their heart meter and get the good ending for that character. Even though this game features voices, the minor characters still remains un-voiced, which results in only viewing text written on the screen while the character is silent. "Zansu" is one example. The voiced characters only include: Sakura, Zakuro, Dokuro, Benomu, Sabato and Shizuki.

There are videos in the game, but are recycled from the TV anime. The extremely violent scenes are censored by only showing a white screen with blood splatting all over it. However, the CG is all new and the game has over 90+ pictures. There are five mini-games added together in the game. Once the games are completed, the players gets a CG from the character of the player's choice. A challenge mode in the mini-game section is opened afterwards, where the player has to score 100 points on those five games to be able to make available a last chapter where Sakura dreams where all girls turn twelve-years-old; this chapter includes the remaining CGs of the characters.

Dokuro also appears as a playable character in the game, Dengeki Gakuen RPG: Cross of Venus for the Nintendo DS and as a cameo costume for the main character in Nippon Ichi Software's Z.H.P. Unlosing Ranger VS Darkdeath Evilman for the PlayStation Portable. Dokuro also makes an appearance as an assist in the French Bread fighting game Dengeki Bunko: Fighting Climax.
