= Missing (novel series) =

Series of Japanese light novels by Gakuto Coda

- Genre: Horror
- Light novel
- Written by: Gakuto Coda
- Illustrated by: Shin Midorikawa
- Published by: MediaWorks
- English publisher: NA: Tokyopop
- Imprint: Dengeki Bunko
- Original run: July 10, 2001 – June 10, 2005
- Volumes: 13
- Manga

Missing: Kamikakushi
- Written by: Gakuto Coda
- Published by: MediaWorks
- English publisher: NA: Tokyopop
- Magazine: Dengeki hp
- Original run: June 27, 2005 – November 26, 2005
- Volumes: 3

Missing is a series of Japanese light novels by Gakuto Coda, published by MediaWorks under their Dengeki Bunko label. The first novel in the series was adapted into a manga, which was released in English by Tokyopop along with the first two novels. Missing is a modern fantasy and horror series involving five high school students dealing with a series of supernatural events.

== Characters ==
Kyoichi Utsume (空目 恭一, Utsume Kyōichi) / The Shadow / The Dark Lord of the Human World
Generally addressed as "Dark Lord" by most classmates, as "The Shadow" by Togano Yomiko, he is a walking library of supernatural knowledge. While handsome, his eyes are piercing, and he often frightens people. As a child he and his younger brother Souji were captured by a kami-kakushi, which left Utsume with the ability to smell the other world. His brother never returned. Utsume later learned that black is the color of mourning and began to always wears black clothing. He has amassed an immense amount of 'black' knowledge. He is always unemotional and poker-faced, and never expects anything from anyone. While he never expresses any such desire, he secretly longs for death. He also denies passionately the existence of love -- "Affection is an extension of possessive feelings," he claims. When he met Ayame she told him "You have no idea what it's like to fall." Member of the literature club. He lives, on bad terms, with his father.
Ayame (あやめ) / Kami-kakushi / The Wind that Longs for Human Form
Fragile but beautiful girl with a lonely smile. Utsume introduces her as his new girlfriend, and is caught off guard when they ask her last name; he gives her name as "Kondou", the same name as one of his friends...but only because he could think of no better names in time. It is suggested that her name, "Ayame", is an old and uncommon name. Her black hair and dark red clothing stand out. Sings beautiful songs, which have the power to resist beings from the other world. She herself was once a creature of this world, and ordinary humans are unable to detect her presence unless introduced to her. Said to be 16 years old but looks two or three years younger. Always nervous and retiring. Few details are provided about her life. It is rare to see or hear of her without Utsume being nearby.
Toshiya Murakami (村神 俊也, Murakami Toshiya) / Schäferhund, later Loup-garou
A traumatic incident in their childhoods left him very protective of Utsume and his other friends. Fears the other world, is very tall, and athletic. His uncle trained him in an unusual variant of karate. His home is the only shrine in Hazama city. He is called 'Schäferhund' by Togano Yomiko. She explains to him that it means 'German Shepherd', but that the German name for the dog sounds better. Toshiya is a member of the literature club. He lives with his parents, neighboring Utsume's home.
Aki Kidono (木戸野 亜紀, Kidono Aki) / The Glass Beast
Cool, with an acid tongue. Describes herself as a literary girl brought up wrong. Badly bullied as a child, which gave her a fearsome pride. She preserves her own ego by looking down on others. Fears group activities because of her experiences, and is one of the few students to live alone in an apartment, in an apartment building called 'Charme Miyako', an ordinary building which has four apartments in it, near the school. She calls Utsume "Kyo-no-ji" and harbors feelings for him in secret. Which means she does particularly care for Ayame. Member of the literature club. Her mother's ancestors have a heritage of Inugami-suji, which runs in their blood and Aki's blood.
Takemi Kondou (近藤 武巳, Kondō Takemi) / The One Who Remembers
A very ordinary boy. Acutely aware of this, which makes him admire strange people. Number one member of the Utsume fanclub, but that leads to tragic results. The only member of the main six cast members whose past remains unknown, but his parents appear to be alive and well. The most feminine looking of the male characters. Has a bell which leads to the other world hanging from his cell phone strap. Outgoing, and friendly with Ryoko, the other ordinary member of the literature club. He lives in the boys' dorm. His roommate is Okimoto.
Ryoko Kusakabe (日下部 稜子, Kusakabe Ryōko) / The Gentle Mirror
Too capable of sympathizing with others, a bright and kind girl. Has many friends, but this often puts her in danger. Has a complicated background. Second member of Utsume's fanclub, but in love with Takemi. She was the last person to see Utsume on this side. She lives in the girls' dorm. Her roommate is Nukata Nozomi.
Yomiko Togano (十叶 詠子, Togano Yomiko) / The Witch
A third year student at the school. Calls herself a witch, and the name has caught on. A mysterious individual prone to deep pronouncements. Unnaturally innocent. Entirely lacks malice*. Toshiya says that she can almost always be found at the pond in the school garden. She likes to stand there, looking at the sky and smiling to herself. She said "There was no meaning, just a reason... Remember: the world is a story..." Utsume answers that she is insane and she replies that they are both insane.
Kageyuki Jinno (神野 陰之, Jinno Kageyuki) / The Dark Lord of the Night / Darkness Given Name / Supporter of All Good and Evil / The First Magician / The Granter
Darkness. Gave Takemi the bell. Unclear if he was ever human — his existence is a mystery. Discovered too many secrets, and became magic itself. At his first meeting with Takemi and Toshiya he told them that Ayame was once human but fell to the other side, and has gone mad from the loneliness. He thought that they have an extremely low chance of success, and they will likely have to kill Ayame, "though that is so hard when she is already dead." Had no desires, but loves change.
Matsukata Ozaki (小崎 摩津方, Ozaki Matsukata) / The Occultist / The Magician Hanging from the Tree of the World
Wrote under the pen name Oosako Eiichiro. One of the founders of Seisou Academy, left many magical items behind in the school. His books contain many accounts of genuine supernatural events, and reading them can cause those events to occur. The Agency has carefully removed these books from general circulation. This did not stop Utsume from acquiring several of them through private channels. Hanged himself from a tree on school grounds. Has a horribly twisted smile, showing the pure malice in his heart.
Yutaka Kijou (基城 秦, Kijō Yutaka)
The first 'man in black' presented in the novels, in Volume 1 Chapter 4 "Thus Spoke the Magic Hunter". He thinks Aki and Ryoko are intelligent and likeable. They remind him of his daughter, who is the same age and enrolled in a private high school. He hasn't seen his daughter since he joined The Agency, and like all agents is officially listed as 'dead'. He will not let his sentiments interfere with the duties of his responsibilities. The Agency will watch Aki and Ryoko. Once the current matter [Volume 1, 'Missing/Spirited Away'] has been resolved Aki and Ryoko will have their memories erased.
Mikihiko Haga (芳賀 幹比古, Haga Mikihiko) / The Man in Black
One of the men in black from urban legends. An Agent, working for The Agency. The Agency has a powerful influence upon society, and can easily make a few dozen deaths disappear. Often appears before Utsume, giving information and orders concerning supernatural events. Refers to Utsume as 'an experiment.'
The Agency
A governmental unit whose mission is to counter and push back the creatures of the other world. They apply scientific methods in order to develop better methods of combating the other world. At the same time they have found that wider knowledge of the supernatural provides openings for those creatures to rise from the subconscious ooze to our conscious world. Therefore The Agency seeks to classify and remove any 'true' account about the other world. They are capable of erasing a person's memories.

== Media ==
=== Light novels ===
Missing was written by Gakuto Coda and illustrated by Shin Midorikawa. (Note: Only the first twelves volumes were illustrated by Midorikawa. No artist is credited for volume 13.) MediaWorks published the novels under their Dengeki Bunko imprint from July 2001 to June 2005. A reprint of the series was published by Kadokawa under their Media Works Bunko imprint from May 2020 to November 2022. The reprint featured new covers by Mai Hanamura with the same interior illustrations by Midorikawa.

Tokyopop announced they had licensed the series for publication into English at their panel at the 2007 New York Comic Con. Tokyopop published two volumes before the series was cancelled.

List of light novels
No.	Title	Original release date	English release date
1	Spirited Away; Kamikakushi no Monogatari (神隠しの物語)	July 10, 2001 (original); May 23, 2020 (reprint); 4-8402-1866-8 (original); 978-4-0491-3081-2 (reprint)	November 13, 2007; 1-4278-0032-4
Utsume introduces his friends to his new girlfriend, Ayame, and promptly vanishes off the face of the earth. His friends contact a magician and members of an Agency that battles the other world in an attempt to get him back.
2	Letter of Misfortune; Noroi no Monogatari (呪いの物語)	October 10, 2001 (original); September 25, 2020 (reprint); 4-8402-1946-X (original); 978-4-0491-3457-5 (reprint)	March 11, 2008; 1-4278-0033-2
Aki receives a cursed fax, and is haunted by invisible dogs.
3	The Hanged Man; Kubikukuri no Monogatari (首くくりの物語)	January 10, 2002 (original); November 25, 2020 (reprint); 4-8402-2010-7 (original); 978-4-0491-3460-5 (reprint)	— (Note: Scheduled for August 27, 2008 but never released.); 1-4278-0034-0
4	The Hanged Man: Conclusion; Kubikukuri no Monogatari: Kanketsuhen (首くくりの物語・完結編)	March 10, 2002 (original); November 25, 2020 (reprint); 4-8402-2061-1 (original); 978-4-0491-3461-2 (reprint)	— (Note: Scheduled for October 2008 but never released.); 1-4278-0035-9
The Agency asks them to help a student suffering from terrible nightmares. The student turns out to be the granddaughter of a famous occultist, Eiichiro Oosako.
5	Mekakushi no Monogatari (目隠しの物語)	June 10, 2002 (original); February 25, 2021(reprint); 4-8402-2112-X (original); 978-4-0491-3638-8 (reprint)	—
After Takemi and Ryoko participate in a ouija board session, they begin to see a ghostly child wearing a blindfold.
6	Awasekagami no Monogatari (合わせ鏡の物語)	October 10, 2002 (original); June 25, 2021 (reprint); 4-8402-2188-X (original); 978-4-0491-3779-8 (reprint)	—
7	Awasekagami no Monogatari: Kanketsuhen (合わせ鏡の物語・完結編)	January 10, 2003 (original); August 25, 2021 (reprint); 4-8402-2263-0 (original); 978-4-0491-3780-4 (reprint)	—
A student artist has painted each of the seven mysteries hidden in the school, all of them real. He has shards of a broken mirror embedded in his eye.
8	Ikenie no Monogatari (生贄の物語)	May 10, 2003 (original); October 22, 2021 (reprint); 4-8402-2376-9 (original); 978-4-0491-4063-7 (reprint)	—
The headmaster holds secrets from the past, while the ghost of a girl buried in the school walls begins taking girls who shower alone.
9	Zashiki-warashi no Monogatari (座敷童の物語)	October 10, 2003 (original); December 22, 2021 (reprint); 4-8402-2485-4 (original); 978-4-0491-4168-9 (reprint)	—
10	Zoku: Zashiki-warashi no Monogatari (続・座敷童の物語)	January 10, 2004 (original); March 25, 2022 (reprint); 4-8402-2571-0 (original); 978-4-0491-4362-1 (reprint)	—
11	Zashiki-warashi no Monogatari: Kanketsuhen (座敷童の物語・完結編)	July 10, 2004 (original); July 23, 2022 (reprint); 4-8402-2703-9 (original); 978-4-04-914501-4 (reprint)	—
The Witch returns to the school, while a fortune teller has been filling the dorms with zashiki-warashi.
12	Kamioroshi no Monogatari (神降ろしの物語)	March 10, 2005 (original); October 25, 2022 (reprint); 4-8402-2996-1 (original); 978-4-04-914698-1 (reprint)	—
13	Kamioroshi no Monogatari: Kanketsuhen (神降ろしの物語・完結編)	June 10, 2005 (original); November 24, 2022 (reprint); 4-8402-3038-2 (original); 978-4-04-914699-8 (reprint)	—

==== Yama ====
A side story called Yama was published by MediaWorks. Written by Coda, it was published in November 2005.

Side story
No.	Title	Release date	ISBN
1	Yama (夜魔)	November 10, 2005	4-8402-3249-0

Yama was republished into two volumes, with the first volume published by Dengeki Bunko and the second by Media Works Bunko.

Side story volumes
No.	Title	Release date	ISBN
1	Yama: Ki (夜魔 -奇-)	January 10, 2010	978-4-04-868277-0
2	Yama: Kai (夜魔 -怪-)	January 25, 2010	978-4-04-868287-9

=== Manga ===
Three volumes long, adapting the first Missing novel, with art by Rei Mutsuki. Tokyopop has published the series in English since August 2007.

== Reception ==
Anime News Network gave the first Missing novel a positive review, citing, "Moody atmosphere, engaging characters and folklore-based storyline create a supernatural mystery that's worth solving." However, the reviewer found fault with the exposition heavy midsection. Anime on DVD praised the "surprising amount of depth" and the "intriguing" plot, but had some concerns about the characters.
