= Dengeki Taishō =

Japanese radio program

- Genre: Information, Radio drama
- Running time: 30 minutes
- Country of origin: Japan
- Home station: Nippon Cultural Broadcasting; Radio Osaka; Tokai Radio Broadcasting
- Hosted by: Natsuki Hanae; Erika Yazawa
- Created by: ASCII Media Works
- Original release: October 1994
- Website: Dengeki Taishō

Dengeki Taishō (電撃大賞) is a Japanese radio program broadcast by Nippon Cultural Broadcasting, Radio Osaka, and Tokai Radio Broadcasting which first aired in October 1994, and is produced by ASCII Media Works (formerly MediaWorks). The program airs late at night on the weekend ranging between either 1:00-1:30 AM, 1:30-2:00 AM, or 2:00-2:30 AM depending on the broadcasting channel. The program contains any news updates related to ASCII Media Works and light novels published under their light novel imprint Dengeki Bunko. Additionally, radio dramas air on the program based from light novels under Dengeki Bunko. Listeners can send in post cards to the program which may end up being read on the air, and any questions asked by listeners via the postcards are answered.

== History ==
Dengeki Taishō first aired in October 1994 and was originally started to work in connection with MediaWorks' light novel award, the Dengeki Novel Prize, which was first held in 1994. After MediaWorks started their male-oriented light novel imprint Dengeki Bunko in June 1993, the first round of the contest was held the following year, which awarded the Gold Prize to Kyoichiro Takahata for his novel Criss Cross: Konton no Maoh. Due to this, the original title for the radio program was Dengeki Taishō Criss Cross (電撃大賞クリス・クロス), but this was changed in April 1995 to Dengeki Daisakusen (電撃大作戦), and then again in April 1996 when it was changed to the current title. While primarily being an informational program, radio dramas also air on Dengeki Taishō based from light novels under Dengeki Bunko. The show has been through a series of different hosts, each time working as a pair (except the first three months of broadcast which had a single host) and the hosts change frequently. The longest time a host continued with the show was with Taiki Matsuno between January 1999 and September 2003. As of April 2013, the host pair is Natsuki Hanae and Erika Yazawa. For the broadcast on November 4, 2006, the program's title temporarily reverted to the previous Dengeki Daisakusen and was hosted by three previous hosts—Mayumi Tanaka, Rumi Kasahara, and Taiki Matsuno—the first two of which were the hosts during the time the show was actually called Dengeki Daisakusen.

== Hosts ==
1. Kotono Mitsuishi (October—December 1994)
  During this time, the program aired every Sunday between 9:00-9:30 PM.
2. Rumi Kasahara and Mayumi Tanaka (April 1995—March 1996)
  From April 1995 onwards, the program aired late at night around 1:00 or 2:00 AM.
3. Hideo Ishikawa and Yūko Nagashima (April 1996—March 1998)
4. Tetsuya Iwanaga and Miki Nagasawa (April—December 1998)
5. Mae Kuribayashi and Taiki Matsuno (January—December 1999)
6. Taiki Matsuno and Sayaka Yoshino (January 2000—March 2003)
7. Kanako Irie and Taiki Matsuno (April—September 2003)
8. Masumi Asano and Masaya Matsukaze (October 2003—September 2004)
9. Takayo Kashiwagi and Masakazu Morita (October 2004—September 2007)
10. Rina Akiyama and Masakazu Morita (October 2007—March 2008)
11. Rina Akiyama and Hiroki Yasumoto (April 2008—December 2008)
12. Rina Akiyama and Tatsuhisa Suzuki (January 2009—September 2011)
13. Hiroaki Miura and Risa Yoshiki (October 2011—March 2013)
14. Natsuki Hanae and Erika Yazawa (April 2013—ongoing)

== Air times ==
- Chō! A&G+: Thursday from 5:00-5:30 PM and Friday from 7:00-7:30 AM
- Nippon Cultural Broadcasting: Saturday from 2:00-2:30 AM
- Radio Osaka: Sunday from 1:00-1:30 AM
- Tokai Radio Broadcasting: Sunday from 1:30-2:00 AM
