= Gakuto Coda =

Japanese light novelist

Gakuto Coda (甲田 学人, Kōda Gakuto; born 1977) is a Japanese light novelist. His works can be found under both spellings of his name, his works in English translation under 'Coda' and his works in Japanese under 'Kouda'. His series Missing has been adapted into a manga, and Tokyopop released two in the series, 2007 to 2008, before it went bankrupt. He is known for basing his horror novels on research into psychology and folklore.

== Works ==
=== Missing series ===
- Missing: Kamikakushi no Monogatari, ISBN 4-8402-1866-8, July 2001; Spirited Away ISBN 978-1427800329, November 2007
- Missing 2: Noroi no Monogatari, ISBN 4-8402-1946-X, October 2001; Letter of Misfortune ISBN 978-1427800336, March 2008
- Missing 3: Kubikukuri no Monogatari, ISBN 4-8402-2010-7, January 2002; The Hanged Man, scheduled for September 2008, didn't happen.
- Missing 4: Kubikukuri no Monogatari Kanketsuhen, ISBN 4-8402-2061-1, March 2002
- Missing 5: Mekakushi no Monogatari, ISBN 4-8402-2112-X, June 2002
- Missing 6: Awasekagami no Monogatari, ISBN 4-8402-2188-X, October 2002
- Missing 7: Awasekagami no Monogatari Kanketsuhen, ISBN 4-8402-2263-0, January 2003
- Missing 8: Ikenie no Monogatari, ISBN 4-8402-2376-9, May 2003
- Missing 9: Zashiki-warashi no Monogatari, ISBN 4-8402-2485-4, October 2003
- Missing 10: Zoku Zashiki-warashi no Monogatari, ISBN 4-8402-2571-0, January 2004
- Missing 11: Zashiki-warashi no Monogatari Kanketsuhen, ISBN 4-8402-2703-9, July 2004
- Missing 12: Kamioroshi no Monogatari, ISBN 4-8402-2996-1, March, 2005
- Missing 13: Kamioroshi no Monogatari Kanketsuhen, ISBN 4-8402-3038-2, June 2005
- Ya Ma, ISBN 4-8402-3249-0

=== Dansho no Grimm / Grimm Fragments series ===
- Dansho no Grimm 1: Haikaburi, ISBN 4-8402-3388-8
- Dansho no Grimm 2: Hansel and Gretal, ISBN 4-8402-3483-3
- Dansho no Grimm 3: Ningyohime Beginning, ISBN 4-8402-3635-6; of the Little Mermaid
- Dansho no Grimm 4: Ningyohime Finale, ISBN 978-4-8402-3758-1
- Dansho no Grimm 5: Akazukin Beginning, ISBN 978-4-8402-3909-7
- Dansho no Grimm 6: Akazukin Finale, ISBN 978-4-8402-4116-8
- Dansho no Grimm 7: Kin no tamago o umu mendori, ISBN 978-4-04-867016-6, 2008; Hen that lays eggs of gold
- Dansho no Grimm 8: Nadeshiko Beginning

=== Other works ===
- Magic Night Kai, ISBN 4-0486-8287-3, 2010
- Magic Night Odd, ISBN 4-0486-8277-6, 2010
