= Makoto Yoshimori =

Japanese composer and pianist (born 1969)

Makoto Yoshimori 吉森 信
- Born: 1969 (age 56–57); Hiroshima, Japan
- Genres: Acoustic, orchestral, classical, jazz
- Occupations: Composer, arranger, pianist
- Instruments: Piano, keyboard, organ, rhodes piano, accordion, melodica, synthesizer
- Years active: 1986–present
- Website: Yoshimori Makoto Official Website

Makoto Yoshimori (吉森信, Yoshimori Makoto; born in 1969) is a Japanese composer and pianist known for his soundtracks for many animations.

He also works on various artists like Ogawa Mishio, Yumeno Kabu, Umezu Kazutoki, Ohtaka Sizzle, Watanabe Takao and many more.

== Biography ==
Yoshimori Makoto was born in Hiroshima, Japan. He started his musical career in 1986 participating as a keyboardist in a variety of concerts around the Kansai region. In 1991 he graduated from the music program at the Osaka Kyoiku University and then moved to Tokyo in 1992, at first, as a member of Modern Choki Chokies. From 1995 through 1998, being a multi-keyboardist, he played the piano, synthesizer, and accordion at various night clubs around Tokyo for bands such as Hikashu. He also played the piano and accordion for various musicals such as Big in 1998. He joined the keyboard harmonica orchestra P-blot in 1996 and was considered "the most avant-garde man" of the group because of his acute and clear playing. Through his various activities in Tokyo he dealt with many genres of music and learned different aspects of composition, arrangement, and music production. In recent years he has mainly worked as a composer of soundtracks for anime, often collaborating with director Takahiro Omori.

Yoshimori Makoto has released his 1st piano solo CD "Uta no Soba ni: A Song is on Your Side." in 2010, 2nd CD "Oto no Aware" in 2013, 3rd CD "Everyday Evening" in 2020 via his own Apollo Black Records (All solo albums are only available on CD format, unavailable on any streaming services). At the same time of releasing 3rd CD, he launched the completely brand-new Official Website and announced his previous site would close soon.

== Discography ==
=== Original albums ===
Title	Year	Notes
Uta no Soba ni: A Song is on Your Side.	2010	1st piano solo album.
Oto no Aware	2013	2nd piano solo album.
Everyday Evening	2020	3rd piano solo album.

=== TV works ===
Title	Year	Role(s)
Kyou mo Jigoku de Omachi Shiteimasu	2013	Composer

=== Anime works ===
Title	Year	Role(s)
Koi Kaze	2004	Composer (other tracks by Masanori Takumi)
Gakuen Alice	2004	Composer
Baccano!	2007	Composer
Natsume's Book of Friends Season 1	2008	Composer
Natsume's Book of Friends Season 2	2009	Composer
Durarara!!	2010	Composer
Princess Jellyfish	2010	Composer
Natsume's Book of Friends Season 3	2011	Composer
Hotarubi no Mori e	2011	Composer
Natsume's Book of Friends Season 4	2012	Composer
Hamatora	2014	Composer
Re:_Hamatora	2014	Composer
Durarara!! x2	2014	Composer
Natsume's Book of Friends Season 5	2016	Composer

=== Other works ===
Title	Year	Notes
Sai	2002	A part of the "Comfortable Life Sound Series" albums.
Nanatsu no Tobira	2012	Compilation album with music from various animations Yoshimori has worked on.
