= Hotarubi no Mori e =

Japanese manga series by Yuki Midorikawa

- The tankōbon cover of Hotarubi no Mori e, first published in Japan in 2003

蛍火の杜へ
- Genre: Romance, supernatural
- Manga
- Written by: Yuki Midorikawa
- Published by: Hakusensha
- Imprint: Hana to Yume Comics
- Magazine: LaLa DX
- Published: July 2002
- Volumes: 1
- Manga

Hotarubi no Mori e Tokubetsuhen
- Written by: Yuki Midorikawa
- Published by: Hakusensha
- Published: September 5, 2011
- Anime film
- Directed by: Takahiro Omori
- Produced by: Shuko Yokoyama; Hirofumi Sugawara; Masanori Miyake; Tomomi Kyōtani
- Written by: Takahiro Omori
- Music by: Makoto Yoshimori
- Studio: Brain's Base
- Released: September 17, 2011
- Runtime: 44 minutes
- icon

Hotarubi no Mori e (Japanese: 蛍火の杜へ; lit. 'Into the Forest of Fireflies Light') is a one-shot shōjo manga written by Yuki Midorikawa. It was published in the July 2002 issue of LaLa DX in Japan, and in July 2003 it was reprinted in a tankōbon short story collection of the same name, which included four romantic one-shot stories written by Midorikawa. Hotarubi no Mori e tells the story of a young girl named Hotaru and her friendship with Gin, a strange young man wearing a mask, who she meets at the age of six in a mountain forest near her grandfather's country home. Hotaru learns that her friend is supernatural and that touching Gin will cause him to disappear forever. Hotaru returns every summer to spend time with Gin, and their relationship matures as both struggle with its limitations. The inspiration to write the story came suddenly to Midorikawa, who immediately drew the manga—a process that went smoothly despite some initial conflicting elements. Hotarubi no Mori e is considered a starting point for Midorikawa's best-known work, Natsume's Book of Friends.

A 44-minute anime film with the same title was produced in 2011 at the anime studio Brain's Base and directed by Takahiro Omori. The film starred Japanese voice actors Ayane Sakura and Kōki Uchiyama, and its soundtrack included music by Makoto Yoshimori. The film maintained a strong following for months in Japan after its opening on September 17, 2011. The European premiere of Hotarubi no Mori e was on October 8, 2011, at the Scotland Loves Animation festival, where it won the Jury Prize. It was screened at the Leeds International Film Festival, Anime Contents Expo and Anime Expo convention, and also won the Animation Film Award at the 66th Annual Mainichi Film Awards.

The anime was released on Blu-ray Disc (BD) and DVD in Japan on February 22, 2012. An additional story related to the original manga and anime film, titled Hotarubi no Mori e Tokubetsuhen (蛍火の杜へ 特別編), was released in a keepsake edition of the manga 12 days prior to the release of the anime. Both the keepsake edition manga and the limited edition BD ranked No. 13 on Japan's Oricon sales chart shortly after their release. Sakura reported experiencing a strong emotional reaction to the story while recording the voice of Hotaru, and Midorikawa acknowledged that the story had a positive impact on her career. Reviewers universally praised the anime film for its beauty, simplicity, and tenderness, likening it to the works of Hayao Miyazaki of Studio Ghibli and Makoto Shinkai. There were few criticisms, most commonly focusing on its short length.

== Plot ==
The original Hotarubi no Mori e shōjo manga and subsequent film tell the story of a six-year-old girl named Hotaru Takegawa, who gets lost in a forest inhabited by a mountain spirit, as well as yōkai (strange apparitions from Japanese folklore). She is found by a mask-wearing, human-like entity named Gin, who informs Hotaru that he will disappear forever if he is touched by a human. Gin then leads Hotaru out of the forest. Hotaru returns to visit Gin in the forest over the next few days and they become friends despite the limitations on their interactions. Although at summer's end she must leave Gin to return to the city and her studies, Hotaru promises to return to visit him every summer holiday.

As the years go by, Gin hardly ages while Hotaru physically matures and grows closer to his apparent age. Upon reaching adolescence, Hotaru begins to struggle with their budding romance and their uncertain future together, while Gin wishes he could touch and hold the young woman that Hotaru has become. When Hotaru reaches high school, Gin takes her on a date to a festival in the forest hosted by the spirits. The night ends in tragedy when Gin mistakenly touches a young boy who snuck into the spirit festival, though before he disappears, he and Hotaru embrace and confess their love for one another. The story ends with Hotaru accepting her pain and moving on with her life, though she will always treasure the memories of her time with Gin. The 2011 anime film adaptation of the story follows all of the events from the manga, adding only a few additional scenes.

Hotarubi no Mori e Tokubetsu-hen (蛍火の杜へ 特別編, Hotarubi no Mori e special edition), published in 2011, expands on the original story with a short episode told from Gin's perspective. When Hotaru is a teenager, she shares some pudding with Gin before she leaves at the end of the summer. After Hotaru leaves, the yōkai attempt to cheer Gin up by bringing him a couple of persimmons, one of the most prized treats on the mountain. Impressed with the taste, Gin thinks of sharing one of these persimmons with Hotaru next year. After discussing ways to preserve the persimmon with the yōkai and a spirit named Matsumino, Gin sets off to find ice on the highest mountain peak, but is disappointed to find none during the summer. When Gin returns scratched up from his fruitless search for ice, Matsumino feels sorry for him and offers to deliver the persimmon to Hotaru for him. However, not knowing where she lives, Matsumino gets lost and grows hungry. After he returns from his unsuccessful attempt to find Hotaru, Matsumino apologizes to Gin for eating the persimmon and Gin forgives him. The story concludes with Gin seeing Hotaru the following summer and wondering if he will be able to tell her about his feelings for her.

== Production ==
=== Manga ===
The author, Yuki Midorikawa, explained in the postscript of the Aizoban Hotarubi no Mori e reprint that the idea for the story came to her more easily than for any other work up until that point. Although she had been planning to write a story as challenging as Hotarubi no Mori e once she had gained more experience writing manga, she decided to undertake the project sooner when the idea for the story suddenly came to her. Afraid that she might lose the idea, she promptly began to draw it, and Midorikawa's writing progressed smoothly despite having numerous conflicting ideas for the development of the story.

The story came from Midorikawa's desire to draw several scenes. She was interested in drawing a scene where a boy dodges a girl who is falling towards him. She also wanted to draw a shadowy summertime forest, which would allow her to expand the range of tones and blacks used in the manga. A third inspiration was the desire to depict a more tranquil summer festival than those she had drawn before. She was also eager to create the mask worn by Gin at the festival, which resembled the face of a fox whose typical slit eyes were replaced by oval ones to give the mask a "creepy" hybrid fox-primate appearance.

The supernatural love story between Hotaru and Gin is considered a starting point for Midorikawa's best known work, Natsume's Book of Friends, which also depicts ill-fated interactions between humans and yōkai (sometimes referred to as ayakashi). In both stories, differences in lifespan and other insurmountable barriers mar their relationships and attempts to understand each other.

Prior to the anime film's theatrical release in 2011, Midorikawa published an additional chapter to the story, Hotarubi no Mori e Tokubetsuhen. Since the original story was already complete and she initially felt uncomfortable about adding to it, she opted instead to expand on the story from Gin's perspective.

=== Anime ===
Cast
Voice actor	Role
Ayane Sakura	Hotaru Takegawa
Kōki Uchiyama	Gin
Shinpachi Tsuji	Hotaru's grandfather
Izumi Sawada	Hotaru's mother
Hayato Taya	Ryōta (亮太)
Kanehira Yamamoto	Shadow yōkai
Masanori Machida	Beech Tree Hand yōkai
Hiroki Gotō	Lion yōkai
Asami Imai	Masked child (younger brother)
Mami Uchida	Masked child (older sister)
Kumiko Tashiro	Child at the festival

According to animation director Yumi Satou, the anime project originated with his personal wish to animate the original manga, which he enjoyed. The project was given approval in early 2011, and according to the film's producer, Shuko Yokoyama, the anime was originally planned as an original video animation, which would not have been released in theaters. However, the popularity of Natsume's Book of Friends, which was also written by Midorikawa and developed by the same production staff, gave them the support they needed to create an anime film. The film was produced by the studio Brain's Base and directed by Takahiro Omori, starring Japanese voice actors Ayane Sakura as Hotaru and Kōki Uchiyama as Gin. Satou had frequently worked together with Yokoyama on previous projects. Other staff included Akira Takata (character design), Yukihiro Shibuya (art), Hiromi Miyawaki (color design), Hitoshi Tamura (photography), and Kazuhiko Seki (editor). The anime film had a very small staff because it was a very short film and was produced domestically, unlike the TV series, Natsume's Book of Friends, which was primarily outsourced to other countries—a common trend in anime production.

In March 2011, midway through production, the 2011 Tōhoku earthquake and tsunami struck Japan. Despite the national tragedy, the production crew continued its work, and according to Omori, the team hoped that their work would help soothe the nation after it had time to recover. Omori speculated that this was part of the reason for the strong positive reception and the awards the anime later received.

The setting in the manga was based on a shrine in the Kumamoto Prefecture of Japan, known as Kamishikimi Kumanoimasu Shrine, which is dedicated to Izanagi-no-Mikoto and Izanami-no-Mikoto from Japanese mythology. The animation crew spent two hours searching the location for settings on which they could base their art. Because the story was set in the forest of a mountain god, Omori intended the art to represent a "different world" where the background scenery was obscure and the blue sky was slightly brighter than normal. Omori and his crew devoted extra attention to lighting and coloring, making the forest dim with light coming through the canopy and landing on the characters with the appropriate intensity. The contrast between light and dark was also used during the festival scene to emphasize its bizarre nature, reminding the audience that Hotaru should not be there. Because of the significance of the summer season to the story, Omori deliberately loaded the film with summer scenes, such as rustling leaves and chirring of cicadas.

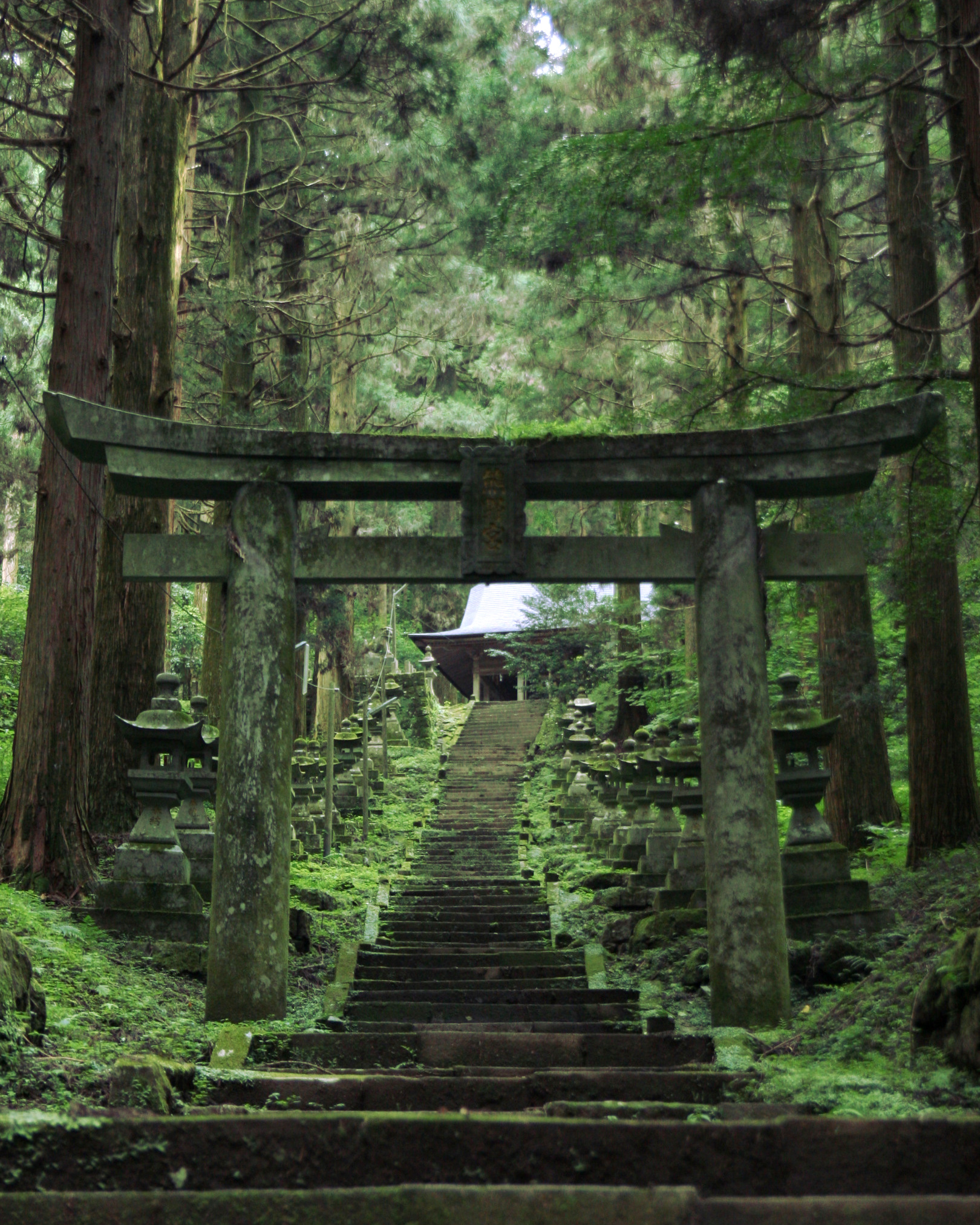
Both the manga and anime were set at the Kamishikimi Kumanoimasu Shrine in the Kumamoto Prefecture of Japan.

According to the Omori, the idea for the opening scene was suggested by Yokoyama; following traditional cinematography, the images of scenes indirectly related to the main story were played while the opening credits appeared. Originally intended to show Gin's life before meeting Hotaru, Omori allowed the viewer to decide its relationship in time with the main story. Omori also opted to start Hotaru's narration from a time after the story's main events; showing Hotaru as an 18-year-old who had just graduated high school and heading back to visit her relatives near the forest. By having Hotaru tell the story in retrospect, Omori thought it provided a more human feel and gave more meaning to the final scene, where Hotaru expresses her hopes for the future by saying, "Come on, let's go."

One of the difficulties in adapting the manga to anime, according to Omori, was that the developing relationship between Hotaru and Gin had to be shown visually, rather than through monologue. One way in which this was done used Hotaru's yearly change in height—by subtly showing the convergence of the length of their strides when walking, the audience is led to perceive a change in their relationship. Omori also wanted to portray more depth to Hotaru's character by expanding on her school life. Although the manga depicted a brief flash of her life in middle school, the anime depicted scenes from both aspects of her life.

Omori shared a draft of the film with composer Makoto Yoshimori so that he could write music to match the tempo. However, there was some disagreement over the ending theme, which Omori and Yoshimori discussed at length over email. Although neither would compromise on key points, the issue was eventually settled and the ending theme was finalized.

Hotaru's voice actor in the anime film, Ayane Sakura, was a fan of Midorikawa and owned the original manga. In an interview, she mentioned that she was thrilled to get an audition and ultimately the role, and also admitted that she shed tears while recording. Kōki Uchiyama, who played Gin, read the manga for the audition, and confessed that he was concerned at first about how to portray his character, though his work made him feel good. The film was initially pre-scored, where the voice acting was recorded prior to the creation of the animation, but later re-recorded for the final version. According to Omori, this allowed the animation to emphasize natural pauses in the dialogue and let the cast set the rhythm and tempo.

== Media ==
=== Manga ===
The manga was first published in the July 2002 issue of Hakusensha's LaLa DX in Japan. It was first reprinted on July 5, 2003, in the tankōbon entitled Hotarubi no Mori e, which included four previously published romantic one-shot stories by Yuki Midorikawa. In addition to the titular short story, the book included "Hanauta Nagaruru" (April 2003), "Kurukuru Ochiba" (November 2002), and "Hibi Fukaku" (January 2003). As part of the 2003 tankōbon short story collection, each of the four one-shot stories were set in a different season: "Hanauta Nagaruru" in spring, "Hotarubi no Mori e" in summer, "Kurukuru Ochiba" in fall, and "Hibi Fukaku" in winter. Within the tankōbon, the stories were arranged in order from spring to winter, although they were originally published in a different order. As of May 15, 2012, the tankōbon was on its 19th printing.

On September 5, 2011, 12 days prior to the anime movie's premiere in Japan, a new story related to Hotarubi no Mori e was published as part of a keepsake edition of the original manga, Aizoban Hotarubi no Mori e (愛蔵版 蛍火の杜へ). The 12-page story, titled "Hotarubi no Mori e Tokubetsuhen" (蛍火の杜へ 特別編), is one of four short stories included in the keepsake edition, which also includes the original "Hotarubi no Mori e" and two other older works by Midorikawa: "Taion no Kakera" (体温のかけら) (2003) and "Hoshi mo Mienai" (星も見えない) (2005).

No.	Title	Release date	ISBN
	Hotarubi no Mori e (蛍火の杜へ)	July 5, 2003	978-4-592-17890-3
Story 1: "Hanauta Nagaruru" (花唄流るる; lit. "Overhearing a Flower Song); Story 2: "Hotarubi no Mori e" (蛍火の杜へ); Story 3: "Kurukuru Ochiba" (くるくる落ち葉; lit. "The Falling of Autumn Leaves'); Story 4: "Hibi Fukaku" (ひび、深く; lit. "Deepening the Scar")
	Aizoban Hotarubi no Mori e (愛蔵版 蛍火の杜へ)	September 5, 2011	978-4-592-19840-6
Story 1: Hotarubi no Mori e (蛍火の杜へ); Story 2: Taion no Kakera (体温のかけら); Story 3: Hoshi mo Mienai (星も見えない); Story 4: Hotarubi no Mori e Tokubetsuhen (蛍火の杜へ 特別編)

=== Anime ===
The anime film, Hotarubi no Mori e, is categorized as a drama/romance, with a running time of 44 minutes. In March 2011, the anime version was to be put on display at the Anime Contents Expo in Chiba, Japan, along with new work on Natsume's Book of Friends, but the event was canceled following the 2011 Tōhoku earthquake and tsunami. The opening date for the film was announced on June 4 on the film's official website. On June 18, special pre-order tickets were sold along with the limited offer of a free poster. Around a week later, four television commercials focused on the anime's main characters were streamed from the film's official website. Sixteen days before the official release, a 96-second trailer was posted on Cinema Today, a Japanese movie website.

The film opened in Japan on September 17, 2011, playing at Theater Umeda in Osaka and Ikebukuro's Cine Libre in Tokyo. The European premiere of Hotarubi no Mori e was on October 8, 2011, at the Scotland Loves Animation festival in Glasgow, followed by interviews and a Q/A session with the animation director and the producer. It was screened again at the Scotland Loves Animation festival in Edinburgh on October 14, along with two other short films produced by Brain's Base studio. It was also a late addition to the 2011 Leeds International Film Festival and shown as a free presentation on November 18 in Leeds Town Hall. Hotarubi no Mori e was one of 60 titles screened at the first Anime Contents Expo held at Makuhari Messe in Chiba in late March 2012. It was also shown on June 30, 2012, at the Anime Expo convention at the Los Angeles Convention Center.

Limited edition copies of the Blu-ray Disc and DVD were released in Japan on February 22, 2012. The limited edition sets included card set illustrations, stickers, a 40-page booklet, a strap with an attached mask (like Gin's), and other limited time specials. The DVD was also released at the same time without these extras.

==== Music ====
Hotarubi no Mori e Original Soundtrack Kisetsu no Matataki

Soundtrack album by Makoto Yoshimori
- Released: August 24, 2011
- Length: 41:14
- Label: Aniplex
- Producer: Makoto Yoshimori

Makoto Yoshimori albums chronology
Natsume's Book of Friends Season 3 Soundtrack (2011)	Hotarubi no Mori e Original Soundtrack Kisetsu no Matataki (2011)	Natsume's Book of Friends Season 4 Soundtrack (2012)

All tracks are written by Makoto Yoshimori.

"Hotarubi no Mori e Original Soundtrack Kisetsu no Matataki" track listing
No.	Title	Artist	Length
1.	"Natsu o Miteita (夏を見ていた)"	Yoshimori, Sizzle Ohtaka	5:28
2.	"Komorebi no Komichi (木漏れ日の小道)"	Yoshimori	2:58
3.	"Ojii-chan no Tenohira (おじいちゃんの手のひら)"	Yoshimori	3:05
4.	"Aru Hi, Mori no Naka (ある日、森の中)"	Yoshimori	2:47
5.	"Natsu to Machiawasete (夏と待ち合わせて)"	Yoshimori	3:44
6.	"Chokoreito (ちょこれいと), Chocolate"	Yoshimori	1:52
7.	"Yurayura to Hirahira to (ゆらゆらとひらひらと)"	Yoshimori	4:02
8.	"Aki mo Fuyu mo Haru mo (秋も冬も春も)"	Yoshimori	4:26
9.	"Tsuki no Ito Akaki ni (月のいとあかきに)"	Yoshimori	3:34
10.	"Kanakana Shigure (かなかなしぐれ)"	Yoshimori	3:48
11.	"Yamagami no Mori e (山神の森へ)"	Yoshimori	3:31
12.	"Shuiro no Inori (朱色の祈り)"	Yoshimori	1:54
Total length:			41:14

== Reception ==
Year	Award	Category	Result
2011	Scotland Loves Animation	Jury Prize	Won
2011	Mainichi Film Award	Animation Film Award	Won

The keepsake edition manga, Aizoban Hotarubi no Mori e by Midorikawa, ranked No. 13 on Japan's Oricon comic sales chart during September 5–11, 2011, with 40,641 copies sold during its first week.

In Japan, the anime was considered a hit, attracting many fans at each screening in Tokyo for several months. Following its European premiere at the Scotland Loves Animation festival in Glasgow, Hotarubi no Mori e was awarded the Jury Award. In January 2012, it won the Animation Film Award at the 66th Annual Mainichi Film Awards and received at the awards ceremony held on February 13, 2012, in Kawasaki, Japan. The limited edition Blu-ray Disc also ranked No. 13 on Oricon's weekly BD sales chart between February 20–26, 2012, with 7,171 copies sold in the five days following its release.

The anime film of Hotarubi no Mori e was well received by its reviewers, and likened to the works of Hayao Miyazaki of Studio Ghibli and Makoto Shinkai. UK Anime Network's Andy Hanley, who attended a screening at the Scotland Loves Animation festival, said it is "beautiful in its simplicity", though noting that the climax seemed a bit rushed and sudden, leaving the audience to struggle with their emotions.

This is a ten-year tale of love, and the weight of the story is on loss. However, what is left at the end is renewal.

— Director Takahiro Omori, September 2011

Nicole MacLean of T.H.E.M. Anime Reviews described it as a "vignette of bittersweet nostalgia", praising the anime for being a "gorgeously detailed piece with beautiful animation." Browne also wrote favorably of the story's progression, noting that its dark undertones grew heavier as the main character matured, and that the consistent characterization of Hotaru from childhood to her early teens was impressive, especially given the film's length. Browne's criticisms were limited to noting the film's short length, a clash between the cartoonish depictions of the forest spirits and the rest of the movie, and an issue with one element of plot development near the end of the film. She did note that sensitive viewers may interpret some aspects of the story as inappropriate, such as the initial age difference between the main characters and the way Gin punishes Hotaru as a child when she tries to touch him. In the case of the former, Browne noted that their romance developed only when Hotaru began to approach Gin's physical age, and with the latter, she noted that no harm was intended. In both cases, she also mentioned that cultural differences must be considered.

Both Yokoyama and Satou noted the "Japanese-ness" of the anime during the panel discussion following the main showing at the Scotland Loves Animation festival. Yokoyama had originally been concerned that foreign audiences would not fully understand and appreciate the work, but the reaction of the audience at the Glasgow showing alleviated his concerns. According to Yokoyama and Satou, elements of the story that exhibited strong elements of Japanese culture included the watermelon eating scene, the part where Gin hits young Hotaru over the head with a stick, and the scene where young Hotaru gets scared at night when she sees the face of a yōkai in the patterns of the wood panels on the ceiling.

Midorikawa attributed the success of Hotarubi no Mori e to the quality of the story, noting even those readers of the original manga who were critical of her artwork were drawn to read the story from start to finish. She speculated that hiding Gin's face behind a mask had helped mitigate some of the artistic issues for which her earlier work had been criticized. The intense pressure experienced by Midorikawa early in her manga writing career was relieved as a result of the positive feedback she received upon her success with Hotarubi no Mori e. In 2011, she expressed excitement for the new anime film and having the manga reprinted in a new short story collection, remarking that her attempts to write about her feelings and recent experiences in relation to Hotarubi no Mori e brought tears to her eyes. She described the story as a "precious work" that helped her build social connections.
