= Sizzle Ohtaka =

Japanese singer (1952–2022)

Sizzle Ohtaka おおたか 静流

Background information
- Also known as: Shizuko Konishi
- Born: Shizuko Ōtaka; 11 April 1952; Nakano, Tokyo, Japan
- Died: 5 September 2022 (aged 70)
- Occupation: Singer
- Years active: 1980s–2022
- Label: Teichiku Records
- Formerly of: Dido
- Spouse: Tokuo Konishi (died 2022)

Shizuko Konishi (Japanese: 小西 静子, Hepburn: Konishi Shizuko; née Ōtaka; 11 April 1952 – 5 September 2022), known by the stage names Sizzle Ohtaka (おおたか 静流, Ōtaka Shizuru) and Shizuko Ōtaka (大高 静子, Ōtaka Shizuko), was a Japanese singer and television personality. After going to a jazz school, she had a prolific career in commercial songs, including her 1990 cover of Shoukichi Kina's song "Hana (Subete no Hito no Kokoro ni Hana o)", which won the Japan Advertising Music Association's 1991 Best Vocalist Award of Commercial Music. She also performed music for anime and live-action works, including I'm Gonna Be An Angel!, Spirited Away, .hack//Legend of the Twilight, and Hotarubi no Mori e, and she was a regular cast member on the NHK Educational TV show Nihongo de Asobo.

== Early life and education ==
Shizuko Ōtaka was born on 11 April 1952 in Nakano, Tokyo, and was educated at the Musashi University Faculty of Humanities. She began studying classical voice as a young child, and while studying at Musashi, she decided upon a singing career instead of becoming a manga artist, and she was part of a global traveling band, attended a jazz school, and worked the night shift at Kokusai Denshin Denwa.

== Career ==
She started a career in commercial songs during the 1980s, and with her diverse voice styles and a rate of ten songs per month, earned the nickname "Queen of Commercial Songs" (コマソンの女王, Komason no Joō). In 1989, she and Michiaki Katō began releasing music as part a duo called Dido.

Ohtaka's solo debut came in 1990, when she covered the Shoukichi Kina song "Hana (Subete no Hito no Kokoro ni Hana o)" for commercials promoting Fujifilm's magnetic media brand Axia, and she later won the Japan Advertising Music Association's 1991 Best Vocalist Award of Commercial Music for said cover. She became affiliated with Teichiku Records after the success of her "Hana" cover. In 1992, she covered The Folk Crusaders's song "Kanashikute Yarikirenai" as part of the film Sumo Do, Sumo Don't, and her album "Return" later won the Adlib Best Record Award for New Age Music and World Music. She also appeared as a vocalist for Nubian musician Hamza El Din's 1999 album A Wish. A compilation album, Otozure (おとづれ), was released in May 2022, four months before her death. She had entered into non-genre music due to a newfound interest in folk, jazz, and world music, and CDJournal describes her musical style as "full of Japanese spirit and [...] influenced by classical, jazz, and folk music".

Ohtaka's song "Ai wa Umi" was the ending theme of I'm Gonna Be An Angel! (1999). She also performed music for several other works, such as Tettō Musashinosen (1997), Spirited Away (2001), .hack//Legend of the Twilight (2003), and Hotarubi no Mori e (2011). In 2003, she became a regular cast member on the NHK Educational TV show Nihongo de Asobo, where she performed improv music and interacted with children.

== Personal life ==
Ohtaka advocated for nuclear disarmament, performed worldwide at memorial concerts in response to the 2011 Tōhoku earthquake and tsunami, and organized the improv workshop Koe no Oekaki (声のお絵描き). She was also known by the nickname "Nanairo no Koe" (七色の声).

Ohtaka was married to Tokuo Konishi until her death.

== Death ==
She was diagnosed with cancer, and in March 2022, she started a career hiatus for treatment. She died on 5 September 2022 from the disease, aged 70.
