= Princess Jellyfish =

Japanese manga and anime series

- Cover of volume 1 of Princess Jellyfish, published by Kodansha

海月姫 (Kuragehime)
- Manga
- Written by: Akiko Higashimura
- Published by: Kodansha
- English publisher: NA: Kodansha USA
- Magazine: Kiss
- Original run: October 25, 2008 – August 25, 2017
- Volumes: 17
- Anime television series
- Directed by: Takahiro Omori
- Produced by: Kazuaki Morijiri; Mitsuhiro Matsuo; Yoshinori Takeeda
- Written by: Jukki Hanada
- Music by: Makoto Yoshimori
- Studio: Brain's Base
- Licensed by: NA: Funimation; UK: Kazé UK (former); Anime Limited (current)
- Original network: Fuji TV (Noitamina)
- English network: US: Funimation Channel, Crunchyroll Channel
- Original run: October 15, 2010 – December 31, 2010
- Episodes: 11
- Live-action film
- Directed by: Taisuke Kawamura
- Produced by: Yūko Ide; Mitsuru Uda; Takuya Matsushita
- Written by: Toshiya Ōno; Taisuke Kawamura
- Music by: Kenichi Maeyamada
- Studio: Asmik Ace Entertainment
- Released: December 27, 2014
- Runtime: 126 minutes
- Television drama
- Directed by: Junichi Ishikawa
- Produced by: Sora Kobayashi
- Written by: Yūichi Tokunaga
- Music by: Kenichiro Suehiro; Mayuko
- Studio: Fuji Television
- Original network: FNS (Fuji TV)
- Original run: January 15, 2018 – March 19, 2018
- Episodes: 10

Princess Jellyfish (Japanese: 海月姫, Hepburn: Kuragehime) is a Japanese manga series written and illustrated by Akiko Higashimura. It was serialized in Kodansha's josei manga magazine Kiss from October 2008 to August 2017. The manga is licensed in North America by Kodansha USA. An 11-episode anime television adaptation directed by Takahiro Omori was produced by Brain's Base and aired on Fuji TV's Noitamina programming block between October and December 2010. The anime has been licensed by Funimation. A live-action film adaptation premiered in Japan on December 27, 2014. A ten-episode live-action drama series aired from January to March 2018.

== Plot ==
Princess Jellyfish centers on Amamizukan, an apartment building in Tokyo, where the only tenants are otaku women, and where no men are allowed. While each character has her own particular fixation, the protagonist is Tsukimi Kurashita, whose love of jellyfish stems from memories of her deceased mother taking her to an aquarium and linking the lace-like tendrils of jellyfish to the dresses of princesses. Tsukimi hopes to become an illustrator and is an awkward girl terrified of social interaction, attractive people and the prospect of formal work.

The other tenants of Amamizukan are the same, being NEETs who refer to themselves as the "Sisterhood" (nuns). Tsukimi meets the stylish Kuranosuke Koibuchi, the illegitimate son of a politician, who cross-dresses to avoid the obligations of politics and to feel closer to his mother. Tsukimi keeps the secret of his masculinity from her man-hating housemates, even as she is troubled by the intimacy of having a man in her room at times.

Amamizukan's neighborhood is under threat of redevelopment, as opportunists aim to turn the quaint area into a more cosmopolitan region, with many of the buildings being demolished to make room for hotels and shopping centers. Although Amamizukan's tenants fear and loathe attractive people, they are helped by Kuranosuke who does not want to see Amamizukan destroyed.

== Characters ==
Tsukimi Kurashita (倉下 月海, Kurashita Tsukimi)
Voiced by: Kana Hanazawa (Japanese); Maxey Whitehead (English)
Played by: Rena Nōnen (2014 film), Kyoko Yoshine (2018 show)
Tsukimi, age 18-19 years old, is a nerdy girl who lives in Tokyo and wants to be an illustrator. Influenced by her late mother, she has a love for all kinds of jellyfish and is quite knowledgeable about them. She is the only resident of Amamizukan who knows Kuranosuke's true gender. Like the other Sisters, she has a fear of stylish people and will usually petrify in their presence. Tsukimi has a pet spotted jellyfish named Clara. Much to her chagrin, she often receives temporary makeovers from Kuranosuke; in these states, she becomes beautiful and Shū falls for her. She reciprocates Shū's feelings but she is led to think that he is in love with Shōko Inari. She grows to be very comfortable around Kuranosuke when he is cross-dressing to the point she nearly forgets his gender, but conversely she gets very nervous whenever he is in his "boy" state in front of her.
Kuranosuke Koibuchi (鯉淵 蔵之介, Koibuchi Kuranosuke)
Voiced by: Mitsuki Saiga (Japanese); Jessie James Grelle (Note: Credited as Josh Grelle; Grelle came out as transgender and changed their name in 2023.) (English)
Played by: Masaki Suda (2014 film), Koji Seto (2018 show)
Kuranosuke is the son of a rich political family. He uses the alias "Kurako" in front of the other Sisters to hide his gender. He enjoys cross-dressing, to the chagrin of his family. Unlike the rest of his family, he does not find politics interesting at all and desires to get into fashion. He is constantly looking for the address of his mother, who gave birth to him after having an affair with his father, hoping to see at least once more the wardrobe she kept with so much passion. After meeting Tsukimi and helping her rescue Clara from a pet store, he starts paying her visits, finding her more interesting than anything else in his life. Throughout his life he has been popular with pretty girls, thus he almost cannot believe it when he starts realizing he may have feelings for Tsukimi.
Chieko (千絵子)
Voiced by: Kimiko Saito (Japanese); Cynthia Cranz (English)
Played by: Azusa Babazono (2014 film), Eriko Tomiyama (2018 show)
Chieko is one of the Sisterhood who is the manager of Amamizukan. She is obsessed with dressing in traditional Japanese clothes, such as in a kimono, and collects traditional Japanese dolls. Her mother is the owner of the building, but is rarely present as she is a groupie of Bae Yong-joon. Chieko is the only Sisterhood member who never receives a makeover from Kuranosuke, on the grounds that wearing traditional Japanese clothing in the middle of Tokyo makes her fashionable to begin with. Due to her interests, Chieko is an excellent seamstress.
Mayaya (まやや)
Voiced by: Akemi Okamura (Japanese); Monica Rial (English)
Played by: Rina Ōta (2014 film), Rio Uchida (2018 show)
Mayaya is one of the Sisterhood who is obsessed with Records of the Three Kingdoms. She makes constant references to events of that time, tends to be overly excited, and shouts when she speaks.
Banba (ばんば)
Voiced by: Motoko Kumai (Japanese); Mariela Ortiz (English)
Played by: Chizuru Ikewaki (2014 film), Rena Matsui (2018 show)
Banba is one of the Sisterhood who is obsessed with all kinds of trains. She can accurately judge the quality of food just by looking at it, an ability referred to in the anime as the "Banba scope." She claims to be eight years old, due to her being born on a leap year, putting her chronological age between 32 and 35.
Jiji (ジジ)
Voiced by: Mamiko Noto (Japanese); Leah Clark (English)
Played by: Tomoe Shinohara (2014 film), Haruka Kinami (2018 show)
Jiji is one of the Sisterhood who is obsessed with mature, old men. She tends to blend into the background and is constantly afraid of falling ill.
Shū Koibuchi (鯉淵 修, Koibuchi Shū)
Voiced by: Junichi Suwabe (Japanese); Ian Sinclair (English)
Played by: Hiroki Hasegawa (2014 film), Asuka Kudo (2018 show)
Shū is Kuranosuke's 30-year-old half-brother and a personal assistant to their father. Due to catching his father cheating with Kuranosuke's mother at a young age, he has a phobia of women. However, after first seeing Tsukimi all dressed up, he starts becoming attracted to her, though he initially cannot recognize her when she wears her regular clothes.
Shōko Inari (稲荷 翔子, Inari Shōko)
Voiced by: Junko Kitanishi (Japanese); Jamie Marchi (English)
Played by: Nana Katase (2014 film), Rika Izumi (2018 show)
A real estate developer who plans to turn the Amamizukan into a high-rise hotel. She manipulates Shū, spiking his drink with sedatives at a bar and makes him believe they had sex so she can blackmail him into getting in good relations with his father.
Juon Mejiro (目白 樹音, Mejiro Juon)
Played by: Kenichi Takitō (2018 show)
Mejiro is a popular writer of yaoi manga, treated with great reverence by the other Sisters. Due to her anthropophobia and nocturnal habits she is barricaded in her room and has only been seen a few times by Chieko. Her only communication with the Sisterhood are sheets of paper slipped under her door, and the Sisterhood has developed a ritual of preparing questions for Mejiro and slipping them to her. Sometimes she has the Sisterhood help her out with her manga, especially near deadlines. Unlike the other Sisters who are simply nervous around or have no interest in men, Mejiro has a very strong dislike of men. However, it is revealed at the end of the manga that Mejiro is actually a guy. He has deep affections for Chieko and declares that men should be banned from Amamizukan because he did not want other men to fall for Chieko. Unfortunately, this backfired and he could not leave his room as a result.
Yoshio Hanamori (花森 よしお, Hanamori Yoshio)
Voiced by: Takehito Koyasu (Japanese); Christopher Bevins (English)
Played by: Mokomichi Hayami (2014 film), Jun Kaname (2018 show)
Hanamori is the Koibuchi family's chauffeur and a childhood friend of Shū. He's a Mercedes-Benz enthusiast and easily caves under pressure, bribery, or requests from people with an afro. A smooth-talker who loves to flirt, he's more self-centered than not despite a solid streak of decency. He bears the distinction of being the only male allowed freely in and out of Amamizukan.
Lina (リナ, Rina)
Voiced by: Seiko Yoshida
Played by: Mayumi Wakamura (2018 show)
Kuranosuke's biological mother. She used to be a stage actress, but became Keiichirō's lover and became pregnant with Kuranosuke. After giving birth, she and Kuranosuke lived together, but Keiichirō separated them. She is currently living with an Italian man in Italy. When she received an email from a friend with a video of Kuranosuke attached, she contacted Shū, but told him not to tell Kuranosuke.
Clara (クララ, Kurara)
Voiced by: Sumire Morohoshi (Japanese); Lara Woodhull (English)
Tsukumi's pet spotted jellyfish. She is kept in a tank on the floor of Amamizukan. She was saved by Tsukimi and Kuranosuke when she was in mortal danger after being carelessly put together with an Aurelia aurita at a pet store, and was the reason for their encounter with each other. Tsukimi seems to have paid a considerable amount of money to keep the jellyfish, including the aquarium and artificial seawater. Since she is a jellyfish, she doesn't do anything special, but she is a source of emotional support for Tsukimi. Tsukimi draws illustrations of anthropomorphic Clara and makes stuffed animals based on her, which is how Tsukimi's sense of style caught the attention of Kuranosuke. The anthropomorphic Clara is the mascot character of the story, providing commentary throughout the chapters, and in the anime adaptation, she is also featured on the eyecatch cards. She usually speaks in a respectful tone, but when dealing with jellyfish, she takes on a friendlier tone.

== Media ==
=== Manga ===
Written and illustrated by Akiko Higashimura, Princess Jellyfish was serialized in Kodansha's josei manga magazine Kiss from October 25, 2008, to August 25, 2017. Kodansha collected its chapters in 17 tankōbon volumes, released from March 13, 2009, to November 13, 2017. Kodansha USA licensed and released the manga in North America in nine omnibus editions from March 22, 2016, to June 5, 2018. Crunchyroll also added the manga to its web distribution service. The manga is licensed by Star Comics in Italy, and Akata in France.

==== Volume list ====
No.	Original release date	Original ISBN	English release date	English ISBN
1	March 13, 2009	978-4-06-340744-0	March 22, 2016	978-1-63-236228-5
2	July 13, 2009	978-4-06-340762-4	March 22, 2016	978-1-63-236228-5
3	November 13, 2009	978-4-06-340775-4	June 14, 2016	978-1-63-236229-2
4	March 12, 2010	978-4-06-340790-7	June 14, 2016	978-1-63-236229-2
5	August 10, 2010	978-4-06-340812-6	November 8, 2016	978-1-63-236230-8
6	November 26, 2010	978-4-06-340824-9	November 8, 2016	978-1-63-236230-8
7	April 13, 2011	978-4-06-340841-6	April 4, 2017	978-1-63-236231-5
8	September 13, 2011	978-4-06-340855-3	April 4, 2017	978-1-63-236231-5
9	March 13, 2012	978-4-06-340874-4	June 20, 2017	978-1-63-236233-9
10	September 13, 2012	978-4-06-340887-4	June 20, 2017	978-1-63-236233-9
11	March 13, 2013	978-4-06-340903-1	September 19, 2017	978-1-63-236232-2
12	July 12, 2013	978-4-06-340912-3	September 19, 2017	978-1-63-236232-2
13	December 13, 2013	978-4-06-340921-5	December 12, 2017	978-1-63236505-7
14	September 12, 2014	978-4-06-340934-5	December 12, 2017	978-1-63236505-7
15	January 13, 2015	978-4-06-340941-3	April 3, 2018	978-1-63236563-7
16	May 13, 2016	978-4-06-340987-1	April 3, 2018	978-1-63236563-7
17	November 13, 2017	978-4-06-510452-1	June 5, 2018	978-1-63236564-4

=== Anime ===
An 11-episode anime television series adaptation produced by Brain's Base, directed by Takahiro Omori, and written by Jukki Hanada aired in Japan between October 15 and December 31, 2010, on Fuji Television's Noitamina programming block. Character designs were provided by Kenji Hayama and the music was composed by Makoto Yoshimori. Prior to the anime, a mini-anime version called Go, Sisterhood Explorers! (それ行け!尼〜ず探検隊, Sore Ike! Amāzu Tankentai), six 1-minute episodes, was broadcast in August of the same year. It had nothing to do with the main storyline, but rather depicted the adventures of the Sisterhood as they explored the jungle. Four BD/DVD compilation volumes were released from January to April 2011, and each volume contained a bonus anime short called Princess Jellyfish - Heroes that focused on each of the Sisterhood members. The opening theme is "Koko Dake no Hanashi" (ここだけの話; "Just Between Us") by Chatmonchy and the ending theme is "Kimi no Kirei ni Kizuite Okure" (きみのきれいに気づいておくれ; "Please Realize How Beautiful You Are") by Sambomaster. Actor Takeo Chii makes a special appearance in the anime as Jiji's beloved goods (posters, etc.), and is also listed in the ending credits. In addition, the son of the original author, Akiko Higashimura (nicknamed Gocchan), makes a brief appearance as a background character in episode 8.

Funimation simulcasted the series on its video streaming website as part of their deal with Fuji TV; the first two episodes premiered on October 28, 2010. Funimation later licensed the series in North America in response to positive feedback from a fan survey posted on their Facebook page and released the series on BD/DVD on February 28, 2012. The series made its North American television debut on September 11, 2012, on the Funimation Channel.

==== Episode list ====
No.	Title	Directed by	Written by	Original airdate
1	"Sex and the Sisterhood"; Transliteration: "Sekkusu ando za Amāzu" (Japanese: セックス・アンド・ザ・アマーズ)	Takahiro Omori	Jukki Hanada	October 15, 2010
Tsukimi Kurashita is a nerd living in an all-female apartment building, Amamizukan, with other nerdy women. One day, Tsukimi, who has an intense love for jellyfish, tries to go to Shibuya for a jellyfish exhibit, but turns back when she becomes apprehensive at all the stylish girls walking around Shibuya. Later, when reminiscing about her dead mother, Tsukimi goes to see a spotted jellyfish she named Clara at a local pet store to cheer her up. She is shocked to find a moon jellyfish in the same tank, as this will eventually cause the spotted jellyfish to die. Overcoming her fear of talking with the stylish male shop clerk, Tsukimi tries to explain the imminent danger to the jellyfish, but is pushed back when she tries to enter the store. She bumps into a stylish woman outside the store, who eventually reasons with the clerk to give Clara to Tsukimi, since it will die anyway. They take it back to Amamizukan and put it into the bathtub for the night. The woman stays the night, and the next morning Tsukimi discovers the woman is in fact a cross-dressing man.
2	"Sukiyaki Western Matsusaka"; Transliteration: "Sukiyaki Uesutan Matsusaka" (Japanese: スキヤキ・ウエスタン・マツサカ)	Katsumi Terahigashi	Jukki Hanada	October 29, 2010
Tsukimi has some trouble in the morning trying to keep the man, Kuranosuke Koibuchi, from being spotted by her housemates. Later that day, Kuranosuke shows up again, disturbing the residents who are not used to the presence of chic people. Tsukimi is particularly troubled as she needs to keep his gender a secret. His over-friendliness rubs off the wrong way with the other residents and they tell him to leave. As way of apology, Kuranosuke manages to get them some high quality meat from his house, and it turns out that he is the son of a wealthy politician.
3	"Enchanted"; Transliteration: "Mahō o Kakerarete" (Japanese: 魔法をかけられて)	Yui Umemoto	Yuki Enatsu	November 5, 2010
While avoiding a family business meeting to visit the Sisterhood, Kuranosuke makes a bad impression when asking about their income. Later, he secretly takes Tsukimi to his house and gives her a makeover which she is not particularly happy about. As Tsukimi escapes, she catches the eye of Kuranosuke's brother, Shū, who takes interest in her and goes to return her clothes. While Tsukimi seems to also take interest from seeing him, Shū does not recognize her in her usual clothing.
4	"I'll See You in My Aquarium"; Transliteration: "Suizokukan de Aimashō" (Japanese: 水族館で逢いましょう)	Masahisa Koyata	Touko Machida	November 12, 2010
Kuranosuke learns Shū is planning to redevelop the Amamizukan into a hotel in two years time, though is surprised that none of the residents are too bothered. Kuranosuke decides to accompany Tsukimi to an aquarium and dresses her up again, convincing Shū to accompany them. As Tsukimi becomes fascinated by the jellyfish, Kuranosuke gets strange feelings from looking at Tsukimi. After changing into his male wear, he finds Tsukimi being embraced by Shū as she was crying from remembering her mother and feels jealous. After Tsukimi gets over it, she soon feels embarrassed by the hug. When she returns, she finds the resident manga author, Juon Meijiro, only has a week until her next deadline so the others have to rush to ink pages. However, she loses her concentration following Shū seeing her in her tank top. Meanwhile, Kuranosuke is disturbed to find Shū is still a virgin.
5	"I Want to Be a Jellyfish"; Transliteration: "Watashi wa Kurage ni Naritai" (Japanese: 私はクラゲになりたい)	Nanako Shimazaki	Jukki Hanada	November 19, 2010
Chieko, the daughter of the Amamizukan's manager, learns that her mother plans to sell the place and the residents will have to move out in a year. The Sisterhood attends a presentation on the urban renewal project to protest, where they run into Shū (who still doesn't recognize Tsukimi in her normal wear), but they quickly leave since they can't stand being stared at. When the project leader, Inari, assumes Shū plans to back the opposition, she takes him out in order to persuade him otherwise, which Tsukimi sees. Annoyed by their willingness to give up, believing it to be the reason Tsukimi is upset, Kuranosuke decides to give the Sisterhood makeovers so they can be taken seriously.
6	"Night of the Living Sisterhood"; Transliteration: "Naito obu za Ribingu Amāzu" (Japanese: ナイト・オブ・ザ・リビング・アマーズ)	Katsumi Terahigashi	Yuki Enatsu	November 26, 2010
Inari takes Shū to a bar and spikes his drink in order to take advantage of him at a hotel. Meanwhile, Kuranosuke takes the newly styled up Sisterhood to a fancy café and treats them to some high class food, and Kuranosuke is once again taken aback by Tsukimi's cuteness. As Shū recovers and believes he's been sexually assaulted, he makes a run for it. Kuranosuke later learns from one of the family employees, Hanamori, knows about Shū's phobia of women, which originated when he caught his father cheating on his mother with another woman, Kuranosuke's mother. Later, Shū briefly visits Tsukimi to shake her hand.
7	"Spellbound and Stone Broke"; Transliteration: "Kinyū Mushoku Rettō" (Japanese: 金融無職列島)	Masahisa Koyata	Tōko Machida	December 3, 2010
While Inari makes plans to return Shū's glasses, she drops by the Amamizukan to bribe the Sisterhood with sweets, and Tsukimi becomes depressed when she sees Shū's glasses in her bag. Before she leaves, Inari is confronted by Kuranosuke, who says they will stand against her by buying the Amamizukan from the original owner. Tsukimi later asks Kuranosuke about Inari's apparent relation to Shū and cries about it. Kuranosuke soon realises the Sisterhood is skint, so he suggests selling some of their possessions to raise funds, which they don't take too well. As Tsukimi gets stunned by seeing Kuranosuke topless, he almost kisses her before they are interrupted by the need for a fax machine. Meanwhile, Inari lies about having sex with Shū in order to blackmail him. After convincing Meijiro to put in a down payment for the Amamizukan, Kuranosuke tries to blackmail his father for the rest, but this fails since he only made it to second base. Instead, he reserves a stand at an upcoming flea market and looks through the Amamizukan storage.
8	"Million Dollar Babies"; Transliteration: "Mirion Darā Beibīzu" (Japanese: ミリオンダラー・ベイビーズ)	Yui Umemoto	Yuki Enatsu	December 10, 2010
Tsukimi and Kuranosuke find various retro crockery for their flea market. Meanwhile, Shū's father has Hanamori ask his private investigator friend, Sugimoto, to tail Shū in order to find out about Inari. At the flea market, Kuranosuke discovers that a jellyfish shaped teru teru bōzu that Tsukimi made sells well, so he arranges for the Sisterhood to help her make more. Sugimoto learns that Inari is blackmailing Shū in order to seal the development deal. After seeing Tsukimi entranced by frilly material, Kuranosuke wonders if he is having feelings for her. Meanwhile, Hanamori accidentally informs Shū about Sugimoto tailing him. Assuming Tsukimi might be interested in clothes, Kuranosuke suggests they work together to make jellyfish dresses to sell.
9	"Midnight Pureboy"; Transliteration: "Mayonaka no Cherībōi" (Japanese: 真夜中のチェリーボーイ)	Nanako Shimazaki	Tōko Machida	December 17, 2010
Inari manages to get Shū to set up a meeting with his father. Kuranosuke and Tsukimi go to his house to strategise their dress making and run into them. Kuranosuke questions Inari's lies about having sex with Shū, though when she shows off the doctored photo, Tsukimi believes it and runs off, leaving behind her sketchbook. Kuranosuke finds a sketch of a chrysaora melanaster and gets inspiration. Meanwhile, Tsukimi, having trouble sleeping, has some sweet sake to fall asleep. She is later carried to bed by Kuranosuke, with Tsukimi dreaming of her mother.
10	"Terms of Lukewarmment"; Transliteration: "Ai to Nurumayu no Hibi" (Japanese: 愛とぬるま湯の日々)	Masahisa Koyata	Jukki Hanada	December 24, 2010
Kuranosuke tries to get Chieko's help in making a flower hat jelly shaped skirt, but she can only make kimonos, so she simply offers to do stitching while Kuranosuke and Tsukimi are left to figure everything else out. Meanwhile, Sugimoto is requested by Shū's father to investigate Tsukimi while Shū is still being manipulated by Inari. Tsukimi helps make progress on the skirt, but when Kuranosuke suggests moving production to his house, Tsukimi remembers about Shū and becomes depressed. When Shū calls Inari when she is way too drunk, he rushes over, only to find her faking having an overdose. He slaps her and decides to flee to Narita. Tsukimi gets out of her funk thanks to Kuranosuke and works with Chieko and Jiji to finish their dress, inadvertently using a pearl necklace given to Kuranosuke by his mother. However, when Mayaya and Banba return from Chinatown after being chased out by Kuranosuke, they find the Amamizukan encased in a construction zone.
11	"Jellyfish of Dreams"; Transliteration: "Jerīfisshu obu Dorīmusu" (Japanese: ジェリーフィッシュ・オブ・ドリームス)	Katsumi Terahigashi	Jukki Hanada	December 31, 2010
As Tsukimi gets excited to make more dresses, the other Sisters finds out about the Amamizukan, only to later learn it was a mistake from the construction workers. However, they later receive a call from Chieko's mother, which causes Tsukimi to become determined to produce more teru teru bōzu to raise the money needed quickly. Kuranosuke decides to enter Tsukimi's dresses into a fashion show, where they place first in every category. Meanwhile, Inari, who appears to have developed a crush on Shū following their last encounter, ends up sharing a plane with him. Tsukimi gets a little nervous when being introduced as the designer, but manages to label her brand as "Jellyfish." Later, Chieko's mother returns home, who says she no longer plans to sell the Amamizukan.

=== Live-action ===
A live-action film adaptation produced by Asmik Ace Entertainment premiered in Japanese theaters on December 27, 2014. The film is directed by Taisuke Kawamura and the script is written by Toshiya Ono.

A 10-episode live-action drama series adaptation aired on Fuji TV from January 15 to March 19, 2018. The drama is directed by Junichi Ishikawa and the script is written by Yuuichi Tokunaga.

== Reception ==
In 2010, Princess Jellyfish won the Kodansha Manga Award for best shōjo manga. It was also nominated for the Manga Taishō Award that year. In 2017, it was nominated for the Eisner Award in the "Best U.S. Edition of International Material—Asia" category, for its first three volumes.

It was reported in August 2010 that over 1 million copies of the manga have been sold. During their first week of sales, the fourth volume of the manga sold about 27,000 copies, and the fifth volume sold about 55,000 copies. The sixth volume sold over 60,000 copies in its first week, and exceeded 100,000 copies sold in total the week after.

Princess Jellyfish has been considered one of the best anime of the 2010s by Polygon. Julia Lee highlighted its message of "Everyone is beautiful and interesting and it should be a crime to not see yourself that way". Crunchyroll staff also included it in such a list; reviewer Kara Dennison praised "its charming art to its heartfelt story" and said, "Princess Jellyfish is one of those rare precious gems that doesn't depict female otaku-dom as unicorn-rare, but digs into what it really feels like to be a young woman in that walk of life".
