= Natsume's Book of Friends the Movie: Ephemeral Bond =

Natsume's Book of Friends The Movie: Ephemeral Bond
- Teaser poster

Japanese name
- Kanji: 劇場版 夏目友人帳 ～うつせみに結ぶ～
Transcriptions
- Revised Hepburn: Gekijōban Natsume Yūjin-Chō: Utsusemi ni Musubu
- Directed by: Takahiro Omori (Chief); Hideki Itō
- Screenplay by: Sadayuki Murai
- Based on: Natsume's Book of Friends by Yuki Midorikawa
- Produced by: Sayako Muramatsu; Ayako Yokoyama; Shirō Ishihara; Fumi Yazaki
- Starring: Hiroshi Kamiya; Kazuhiko Inoue; Sanae Kobayashi; Akira Ishida; Kazuma Horie; Rina Satō; Sumi Shimamoto; Kengo Kora
- Cinematography: Hitoshi Tamura; Tetsuya Kawada
- Edited by: Kazuhiko Seki
- Music by: Makoto Yoshimori
- Production company: Shuka
- Distributed by: Aniplex
- Release date: September 29, 2018
- Running time: 104 minutes
- Country: Japan
- Language: Japanese
- Box office: $17,473,797

Natsume's Book of Friends the Movie: Ephemeral Bond (Japanese: 劇場版 夏目友人帳 ～うつせみに結ぶ～, Hepburn: Gekijōban Natsume Yūjin-Chō: Utsusemi ni Musubu) is a 2018 Japanese animated film based on Yuki Midorikawa's manga and anime Natsume's Book of Friends. The film is produced by Shuka and directed by Hideki Itō under the chief direction of Takahiro Omori; with an original story written by Sadayuki Murai under Midorikawa's supervision. It was released in Japan on September 29, 2018.

== Plot ==
From a small yokai whose name he has just returned, Natsume travels to a town where his exorcist grandmother Natsume Reiko stayed in for a bit. While walking around, he meets a middle-aged acquaintance of hers named Yorie, who introduces him to her grown son Muokko. Meanwhile Nyanko-Sensei follows some lowly spirits into the woods, and end up with a weird seed stuck on him that later becomes a spirit tree in Natsume's front yard. The next day, the spiritual power of said tree splits Nyanko-Sensei into three, making him almost incomprehensible. Natsume leaves the three lucky feline "triplets" in the hands of "the Dog Circle" while he is at high school, but the third one runs off and encounters Taki Toru who joyfully takes him in.

Natsume meets Tanuma Kaname who helps in looking for the lost Master-Kitty Cat triplet, and notices Mukoko who informs the two that he is responsible for the appearance of the Sacred Tree, and for all of the people's memories disappearing, for he is a powerful daiyokai who had assumed the form of Mokou, who had perished in a mountain accident eight years ago. Disturbed this tragic revelation, Natsume tries to get "Mukoko" to save farewell in some way, so that Yori would feel like she was not be truly alone. "Mukoko" assures him that Yori shall forget all about him interfering in her lonely life, as will Tanuma and Taki.

Self-taught exorcist/movie star Natori Suuichi arrives from filming a new movie, and is on the hunt for a yokai that is on a rampage since the death of his exorcist master who was only known as "the Elder", and runs into Natsume. He is aware of the yokai that erases memories, and intends to destroy him, to which Natsume assures his good friend that it will turn out all right. As Natori prepares the spell to liberate the yokai from its binding supernatural contract, "Mukoko" asks Natsume to return his name to him. Once he does, Honokage tells Natsume how he had met Natsume Reiko in his true winged form; how she had expressed a desire to not be remembered upon her demise. Nyanko-Sensei is back to normal and aids in subduing the yokai for Natori to release it, which turns it int is proper smaller size.

As the Sacred Tree, too, fades, Honokage requests for Natsume to keep watch over Yori. Small orbs of yellow spiritual light surrounds the whole town, and everyone's memories are wiped with the exception of Natsume and Nyanko-Sesnei due to their respective mighty spiritual and demonic powers. After returning the bell that Yori had lost all those decades ago, as Reiko had kept it with her, Natsume comes to see Yorie one last time, who shows him a paper-cutting silhouette of Reiko, as she was the one who had inspired Yorie in her work.She confesses that she and her middle-school friends had secretly looked up to Natsume Reiko from afar, hoping to see something extraordinary, they had followed her often. She admits that if she looks hard enough through the etching of Reiko, she feels that she thinks that she somehow, someway, perceive what Reiko could. Natsume then notices an additional paper-cutting that depicts Honokage in his true winged yokai form. He is slightly unnerved but sorrowful when Yorie mentions that she had been thinking it may have been her son when looking at it.

At a train station, Natsume talks with Yuki one last time, who admits that he had lied when he had told Natsume that he, too, could perceive and detect the spiritual and supernatural like he could in their grade school days, as Yuki truly wanted to be able to see into and understand Natsume's world. The two part ways, and Natsume says that he will keep returning names from his grandmother's Book of Friends, to which Nyanko-Sensei jokingly says that he will eat him when that time comes. But for now, he will wait to see where destiny and fate takes them.

== Voice cast ==
Character	Japanese voice
Takashi Natsume	Hiroshi Kamiya; Ayumi Fujimura (Child)
Madara/"Nyanko-sensei"	Kazuhiko Inoue
Reiko Natsume	Sanae Kobayashi
Shuuichi Natori	Akira Ishida
Kaname Tanuma	Kazuma Horie
Touru Taki	Rina Satō
Jun Sasada	Miyuki Sawashiro
Atsushi Kitamoto	Hisayoshi Suganuma
Satoru Nishimura	Ryōhei Kimura
Touko Fujiwara	Miki Itō
Shigeru Fujiwara	Eiji Itō
Hinoe	Akemi Okamura
Misuzu	Takaya Kuroda
Chobihige	Chō
Hiiragi	Satsuki Yukino
One-Eyed Middle Class Yokai	Takashi Matsuyama
Ox-Faced Middle Class Yokai	Hiroshi Shimozaki
Kappa	Kyouko Chikiri
Sasago	Ayako Kawasumi
Urihime	Akari Higuchi
Daisuke Yūki	Ayumu Murase
Monmonbō	Eiji Kotōge
Roppon-ude	Mizuki Nishimura
Yorie Tsumura	Sumi Shimamoto
Mukuo Tsumura	Kengo Kora
Mamoru	Binbin Takaoka
Habaki	Fukushi Ochiai
Hat Yōkai	Aki Kanada
Small Yōkai of Five Chome Town	Shin'ya Takahashi; Hiroki Matsukawa; Manami Hanawa
Elementary School Teacher	Kenya Tomatsu
Elementary School Girl	Arisa Kōri
Mother	Akane Odagiri
Girl	Ayako Mitani
Nomiya-Sensei	Hideyuki Hori

== Production ==
The cast of the television series also returned to reprise their roles. Uru to perform the film's music "Remember".

== Release ==
The film was released in Japan on September 29, 2018. In Japan, the film was released on Blu-ray and DVD on May 29, 2019.

Aniplex of America released the film in North America, with a premiere at Anime NYC 2019 and a home video release on November 26, 2019.

== Reception ==
Natsume's Book of Friends the Movie grossed $17,473,797 at the box office.
