= Yuki Midorikawa =

Japanese manga artist (born 1976)

- Born: May 23, 1976 (age 50); Kumamoto Prefecture, Japan
- Occupation: Manga artist
- Writing career
- Period: 1998–present
- Notable works: Hotarubi no Mori e Natsume's Book of Friends

Yuki Midorikawa (緑川ゆき, Midorikawa Yuki; born May 23, 1976) is a Japanese manga artist.

She is primarily known for her shōjo manga works in the magazines LaLa and LaLa DX, published by Hakusensha.

Her most successful works have been Hotarubi no Mori e, which received a film adaptation in 2011 and Natsume's Book of Friends, which has been made into an anime series that aired for seven seasons (2008–2024). The manga has sold over 5 million copies by the release of its 12th volume.

== Awards ==
- In 1998, she won the 18th "LMG Fresh Debut" award for her debut work Coffee Hirari.
- In 2000, she won an award by Hakusensha (白泉社アテナ新人大賞デビュー優秀者賞) for Akaku Saku Koe.

== Manga works ==
- Coffee Hirari (珈琲ひらり, Kōhī Hirari) [November 1998], LaLa DX
- Akaku Saku Koe (あかく咲く声) [1998–2000], LaLa, LaLa DX, 3 volumes total
- Hana Oi Bito (花追い人) [2001], LaLa, 3 episodes, no volume publication
- Atsui Hibi (アツイヒビ) [2001], LaLa DX, also published as a tanpenshū of the same name
- Hotarubi no Mori e (蛍火の杜へ, lit. Into the Forest of Fireflies' Light) [July 2002], LaLa DX, also published as a tanpenshū of the same name
- Kurukuru Ochiba (くるくる落ち葉, lit. The Falling of Autumn Leaves) [November 2002], LaLa DX, also published as a tanpenshū Hotarubi no Mori e
- Hibi, Fukaku (ひび、深く, lit. Deepening the Scar) [January 2003], LaLa, also published as a tanpenshū Hotarubi no Mori e
- Hanauta Nagaruru (花唄流るる, lit. Overhearing a Flower Song) [April 2003], LaLa, also published as a tanpenshū Hotarubi no Mori e
- Taion no Kakera (体温のかけら) [2003], also published as a tanpenshū Hotarubi no Mori e Tokubetsuhen (蛍火の杜へ 特別編)
- Hi-iro no Isu (緋色の椅子) [2002–2004], LaLa DX, 3 volumes total
- Hoshi mo Mienai (星も見えない) [2005], also published as a tanpenshū Hotarubi no Mori e Tokubetsuhen
- Natsume's Book of Friends (夏目友人帳, Natsume Yūjinchō) [2003, 2005–2018], LaLa DX
  - Natsu ni wa Tameiki o Tsuku (夏にはため息をつく) included in September 2000 issue of LaLa and Natsume Yūjinchō Volume 7
- Aizoban Hotarubi no Mori e (愛蔵版 蛍火の杜へ) [September 2011], published in the tanpenshū Hotarubi no Mori e Tokubetsuhen

== Other media ==
In 2011, Hotarubi no Mori e was adapted into an anime film. Natsume's Book of Friends was adapted into an anime television series that ran for seven seasons over sixteen years (2008–2024). A series of original video animation episodes were released simultaneously. A theatrical anime film, Natsume's Book of Friends the Movie: Tied to the Temporal World, was released in 2018. A second theatrical anime film, "Natsume's Book of Friends: The Waking Rock and the Strange Visitor", was released January 16, 2021.
