= Hamatora =

Japanese media franchise

- Cover of the first Hamatora: The Comic volume

ハマトラ
- Genre: Adventure, mystery, supernatural
- Created by: Natsu Matsumai; Yūki Kodama
- Manga

Hamatora: The Comic
- Written by: Yukino Kitajima
- Illustrated by: Yūki Kodama
- Published by: Shueisha
- Magazine: Weekly Young Jump
- Original run: November 21, 2013 – December 11, 2014
- Volumes: 3
- Anime television series

Hamatora: The Animation
- Directed by: Seiji Kishi (Chief); Hiroshi Kimura
- Produced by: Yoshikazu Beniya; Hiroyuki Tanaka; Kozue Kaneniwa; Takeshi Ishigaki; Mika Shimizu; Hiroyuki Kiyōno; Shūichi Takashino; Izumi Takiuchi; Naoki Matsushita
- Written by: Touko Machida; Jun Kumagai
- Music by: Makoto Yoshimori
- Studio: NAZ
- Licensed by: AUS: Madman Entertainment; NA: Sentai Filmworks
- Original network: TXN (TV Tokyo, TVA, TVO), AT-X
- Original run: January 8, 2014 – March 26, 2014
- Episodes: 12
- Anime television series

Re:_Hamatora
- Directed by: Seiji Kishi
- Produced by: Yoshikazu Beniya; Hiroyuki Tanaka; Kozue Kaneniwa; Mika Shimizu; Hiroyuki Kiyōno; Shūichi Takashino; Hirotaka Toda; Izumi Takiuchi; Naoki Matsushita; Yōko Baba
- Written by: Jun Kumagai
- Music by: Makoto Yoshimori
- Studio: Lerche
- Licensed by: NA: Sentai Filmworks
- Original network: TXN (TV Tokyo, TVA, TVO), AT-X
- Original run: July 8, 2014 – September 23, 2014
- Episodes: 12
- Anime television series

Mini Hama: Minimum Hamatora
- Directed by: Masaomi Ando
- Written by: Yasuhiro Nakanishi
- Music by: Akira Narasaki
- Studio: Lerche
- Original network: AT-X, dTV
- Original run: November 2, 2015 – December 21, 2015
- Episodes: 8
- Anime film

Fw:Hamatora
- Directed by: Seiji Kishi
- Written by: Jun Kumagai
- Music by: Makoto Yoshimori
- Studio: Lerche
- Released: November 14, 2015
- Runtime: 68 minutes

Hamatora (ハマトラ; lit. 'Yokohama Troubleshooter') is a Japanese mixed-media project created by Natsu Matsumai and Yūki Kodama. The project began with a manga series written by Yukino Kitajima and Yūki Kodama as the artist, with Yū Wazu adapting the original designs for animation. The manga, Hamatora: The Comic, started serialization in Shueisha's Young Jump magazine in November 2013. An anime television series, Hamatora: The Animation, by the studio NAZ premiered on TV Tokyo and ran for twelve episodes between January 8 and March 26, 2014. It was followed by a second series by Lerche starting in July 2014, Re:_ Hamatora. Additionally, a role-playing game titled Hamatora: Look at Smoking World developed by FuRyu was released in July 2014. Other related titles include a light novel and a stage play.

The series takes place in the year 2014 when selected humans called Minimum Holders have been discovered to possess supernatural abilities. The story focuses on Minimum Holder Nice who forms a detective agency called "Hamatora" based in Yokohama and he starts gathering a large number of allies such as his partner Murasaki and assistant Hajime as well as enemies including several criminals. The anime stars Ryōta Ōsaka, Wataru Hatano, Hiroshi Kamiya, Emiri Katō, Kiyono Yasuno, Jun Fukuyama, and Yuichi Nakamura among others.

The series has earned mixed criticism from publications for manga and anime. While the elements of mystery have been praised, the themes and animation have been less well received. It has also been often compared with X-Men for its plot and characters.

== Plot ==
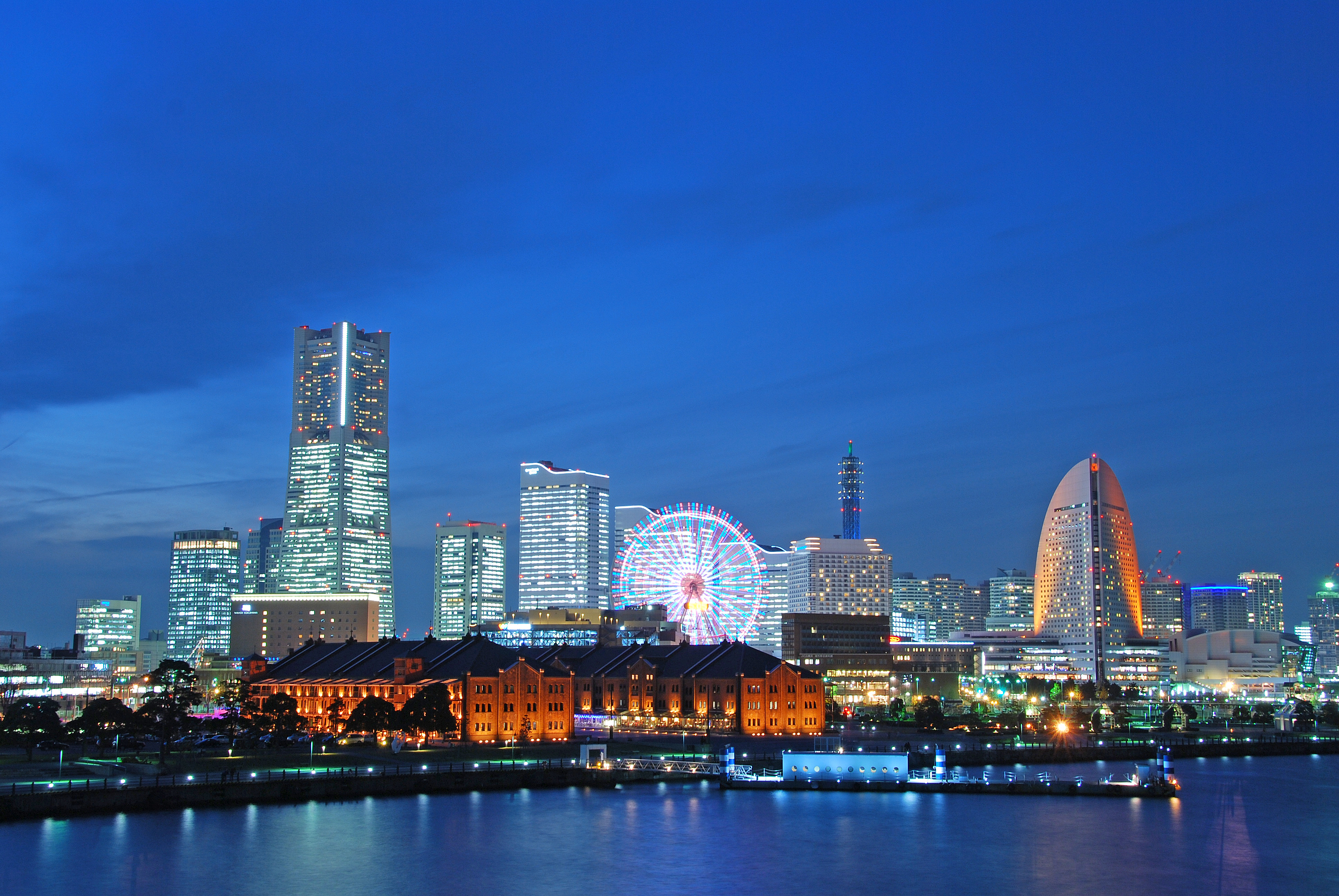
The series takes place in Yokohama.

The story of Hamatora revolves around a 17-year-old teenager called Nice, who runs a private investigation agency called 'Hamatora' in Yokohama, Japan with his partners Hajime and later, Murasaki. In the world there is the existence of Select humans called Minimum Holders (ミニマムホルダー, Minimamu Horudā) whom have been discovered to possess supernatural abilities known as 'Minor Miracles' or 'The Minimum'. These people are trained in the Facultas Academy to develop their potential, and are given highly advanced classes and training to do so. As a result, those who graduate from Facultas are given extreme benefits and privileges that enable them to be highly successful in life, such as being entitled to any job or career they want with ease. The existence of minimums and minimum holders is kept extremely confidential and secretive from the general population of the world.

The events of Hamatora The Comic takes place in the year 2013, with Nice having left Falcutas Academy early in his senior year. Due to Nice both being a genius and a prodigy, Murasaki, the second highest ranked graduate from Falcutas, is tasked with the mission of bringing Nice back to Facultas by any means necessary. As Murasaki first meets Nice, his impressions of him leave Murasaki feeling insulted and angered that someone as easy going as Nice could be superior to him. As Murasaki observes Nice on his jobs though, Murasaki finds himself assisting Nice and comes to see the potential Nice actually possesses as well as acknowledging his genius. He also dwells on Nice's views on Facultas' workings and his opinion of how people with Minimums are not slaves and are free to live their lives responsibly.

Sayuri Akatasuki requests for Nice and Murasaki to rescue her sister Shizuku, a Minimum Holder who can generate fire, from a criminal family. Nice and Murasaki finish their job but Murasaki is tasked to leave Nice and to take Shizuku back to Facultas as part of the Academy's dark dealing with the mafia family. As Murasaki takes Shizuku to Facultas, Nice, Hajime and Sayuri are attacked by Facultas and the Hamatora office is destroyed. As Murasaki hands over Shizuku, he struggles on the decision he made and ends up trying to rescue Shizuku from Facultas. Nice, who managed to save himself, Hajime and Sayuri before defeating the Facultas agents, ends up saving Murasaki, but during the confrontation with Facultas and the mafia family, Shizuku apparently dies. In the week that follows, it is then revealed that Shizuku survived and faked her death so that she and Sayuri can live a new life without fearing her Minimum or Facultas and the Mafia family. Murasaki has since left Facultas and has joined Nice as a Hamatora P.I., which is now located in Cafe Nowhere along with Birthday and Ratio's 'Odd Jobs' Business and Honey and Three's Bodyguard business.

During the anime, Murasaki has joined Nice as a Hamatora P.I., where they prefer to sit around all day with their friends and wait for clients. During their Jobs, Nice finds similarities in the working of several crimes he investigates and the existence of non-innate Minimum Holders; people who possess a Minimum but were not born with it. Nice and Murasaki are warned by their friend, Art, a non-Minimum Holder who still managed to graduate from Facultas, about a Minimum Holder serial killer who extracts the brains to create more Minimum Holders.

The culprit is Moral, a former professor from the Facultas Academy who wishes to give everybody Minimums in order to achieve equality. For this, he has to kill several Minimum Holders and use their brains to create a substance he calls 'essence' that enables him to create 24 non-innate Minimum Holders for every Minimum Holder brain he possesses. While his overall purpose in this is to create equality, what Moral truly wants is to save Nice, as he believes that Nice is tortured by solitude as he is the number one student of Facultas, also calling him the accumulated wisdom of humanity, and therefore has no equal.

Moral kills Art and starts assuming his identity to dismiss Hamatora from the case. He starts a riot in order to expose the existence of Minimum Holders, and Momoka also leaks information exposing the existence of Facultas Academy and Minimum Holder identities, causing a disturbance in society as normal people treat Minimum Holders in a hostile manner, while Minimum Holders fight back to ensure their right to exist. After discovering Moral took Art's face, Nice confronts him in person to get revenge for his best friend's death. The two face off in a ship that Moral is using to perform terrorist attacks on non-Minimum Holders. As Nice defeats Moral, the murderer is killed by a resurrected Art. As revealed in Re: Hamatora, Art survived Moral's attack thanks to Regeneration Minimum, and has since been collecting new abilities. He becomes the leader of a gang called Freemum, composed of Minimum Holders who are against the Minimum Agency. Using Freemum and Momoka, Art succeeds in leaving Nice as his only potential enemy. He tries killing Nice to trigger Hajime's Nihilist Minimum, which erases all Minimums in Yokohama. Shortly afterwards, Nice is revived by the powers of Art's late brother, Skill (his heart had been transplanted by Moral years ago during an incident). As a result, the people in Yokohama recover their lost Minimums thanks to Skill's own power. Nice defeats Art, and six months later they reconcile.

== Characters ==
=== Hamatora ===
Nice (ナイス, Naisu)
Voiced by: Ryōta Ōsaka, Yumiko Kobayashi (Young) (Japanese); Adam Gibbs, Tiffany Grant (Young) (English)
The impulsive founder of the detective agency "Hamatora", Nice works in the manga as the only detective with Hajime's help whereas in the anime he is the half of the "Minimum Holder PI duo" along with his partner Murasaki. He is a former member from an academy of Minimum Holders who left to start a life as a detective, obtaining several allies. He is constantly in need of money, partly due to the fact that he does not care about the cost of a job request more than what it entails.
Despite his seemingly carefree nature, Nice is a genius thinker and able to quickly assess information. He always wears a set of headphones around his neck which he uses to activate his Holder ability, known as Sonic Minimum (音速ミニマム) in the anime and Cannon Ball (キャノンボール, Kyanon Bōru) in the manga, allows him to move at the speed of sound. In Re: Hamatora, using the Minimum causes a strain in his body.^{[Re: ep 5]} He is the top-ranked graduate of the Facultas Academy and went there alongside Art and Skill.^{[Re: ep 12]} His existence is regarded as classified information.^{[Animation ep 3]} He tried to abandon that place alongside Hajime in order to see the world,^{[Re: ep 8]} but was shot in the process; his life was saved by Moral, who transplanted Skill's heart into Nice's body, saving his life, and left shortly afterwards to discover Hajime has amnesia.^{[Re: ep 11]}^{[Animation ep 12]} He detests the academy due to how it judges people based on whether or not they have power and believes power should not be necessary to determine one's worth.^{[Animation ep 2]}^{[Animation ep 10]} In the finale it is revealed Nice has Skill's heart as well as his Minimum, allowing him to grant others Minimums.^{[Re: ep 12]}
Murasaki (ムラサキ)
Voiced by: Wataru Hatano (Japanese); David Wald (English)
The rather reserved other half of the "Minimum Holder PI duo" along with his partner Nice. He is originally an agent of Facultas sent to capture Nice, but ended joining him. He is a rational thinker and unlike Nice, prioritizes the cost of a job request over content.^{[Animation ep 1]} He has a bit of an existentialist outlook on things. His Holder ability known as Gravity Minimum (偉力のミニマム) in the anime and All or Nothing (オール・オア・ナッシング, Ōru Oa Nasshingu) in the manga, is activated when he removes his glasses and greatly hardens his body, giving him super-human like strength.^{[Animation ep 2]} Using the Minimum in Re: Hamatora weakens his body.^{[Re: ep 5]} He is a prodigy who is ranked second among the Facultas Academy graduates.^{[Animation ep 3]} He dislikes how Nice always manages to surpass him and wishes to defeat him once in order to be acknowledged by him.^{[Animation ep 8]}^{[Animation ep 11]}. In Re: Hamatora, Murasaki tries confronting Art but gets beaten up by Freenum.^{[Re: ep 6]} While he survives, his Minimum disappears,^{[Re: ep 7]} and returns to the group.^{[Re: ep 9]} In the finale, he recovers his Minimum.^{[Re: ep 12]}
Hatano has commented that while the series its share of comedy, there is also drama in some parts of the story that could result in the viewer becoming emotional. He compared the series with a festival due to the viewer's feelings. He added "The story will be followed with that feeling, what end will be met the complex case intertwined."
Hajime (はじめ)
Voiced by: Emiri Katō (Japanese); Christina Kelly (English)
A gluttonous girl who spends most of her time at the Nowhere Café. In the manga, she is Nice's only ally and accompanies him to all of his cases. She is one of Hamatora's founders. She suffers from memory loss. Hajime is a test subject from Facultas. She was the first person to survive to a certain experimentation by Moral and was kept in the secrets. In Facultas, she met Nice who named her as she was simply known as "success No.01" and invited her to see the world alongside leaving the academy.^{[Re: ep 8]}
Her Holder ability, while initially unexplained, makes her a strong combatant and is said to be able to rival Nice.^{[Animation ep 5]} Her Holder also heals her wound and is able to unleash a berserk state.^{[Animation ep 12]} By Re: Hamatora it is revealed the Minimum is known as the Nihilist Minimum (虚無のミニマム) triggered by despair which was first activated by seeing Nice nearly dying. It has the power of nullifying every other Minimum around her which cause her friends to go through sideeffects of their powers until they will lose it.^{[Re: ep 8]}

=== Odd Jobs ===
Birthday (バースデイ, Bāsudei)
Voiced by: Jun Fukuyama, Akeno Watanabe (Young) (Japanese); Blake Shepard (English)
Birthday is a Minimum holder who runs an 'Odd jobs' business located in Nowhere Cafe. His demeanor sometimes gets him into trouble such as when he is wrongfully arrested by the police for a bombing while trying to impress some girls.^{[Animation ep 2]} Birthday possesses an unknown disease which nearly caused his death during his childhood. By surviving the surgery that saved him from that death, he defies Ratio's stigma and becomes friends with him. He is determined to live as long as he can because he wants to prove Ratio wrong by being alive. His Holder ability is the Electrick Shock Minimum (電撃のミニマム, Dengeki no Minimamu) which involves electrical manipulation which he activates by biting the tip of a taser and blitz attacks his enemies.^{[Animation ep 6]} Using it in Re: Hamatora causes him to start absorbing electricity.^{[Re: ep 5]} Besides that his terminal disease is back in later episodes and requires help from Freemum in order to heal.^{[Re: ep 9]}^{[Re: ep 12]}
Ratio (レシオ, Reshio)

Voiced by: Yuichi Nakamura, Sanae Kobayashi (Young) (Japanese); Andrew Love (English)

Ratio is Birthday's partner in his 'Odd Jobs' Business as well as Birthdays childhood friend. His Holder ability is the X-Rays Minimum (透視のミニマム, Tōshi no Minimamu) which allows him to see the structure of a person's body and use the information to determine their weak points.^{[Animation ep 1]} Using it in Re: Hamatora causes his body to overheat.^{[Re: ep 5]} He wears an eye-patch over his right eye which when removed activates his Holder ability. After discerning an enemy's weak points, he then uses brass knuckles to melee them into submission. Flashbacks reveal how this ability caused a young Ratio to be distant from others as a result of foreseeing the death of people with weak health, but Birthday's promise to ruin his reputation breaks him free from that curse. As a result, Ratio is determined to protect Birthday and find a cure to his disease.^{[Animation ep 6]}^{[Re: ep 9]}

=== Bodyguards ===
Honey (ハニー, Hanī)
Voiced by: Eri Kitamura (Japanese); Margaret McDonald (English)
A genius whose Minimum, Analysis Minimum (解析のミニマム, Kaiseki no Minimamu), makes use of her self-invented "Mighty Script" (マイティ) program, which allows her to look 10 minutes into the most probable future through a digital pad she calls "Mighty".^{[Animation ep 4]} As a child this ability was planned to be used for assassination jobs as hoped by her father. However, the young Honey created the Mighty Script to give her abilities another use and requested Three's help after relating with him. Her catchphrase is "Got you!" which she says when she sees her target's future. Honey is also Art's acquaintance. She and Three work as bodyguards that have them traveling around the world, while they are mainly located in Cafe Nowhere. However, during Re: Hamatora, after she uses her Minimum she psychologically regresses to her childhood as a side effect.^{[Re: ep 3]}
Three (スリー, Surī)
Voiced by: Katsuki Murase (Japanese); George Manley (English)
Honey's partner. His Minimum ability, the Beast Minimum (獣化のミニマム, Shishika no Minimamu), allows him to take on a beastly form with super strength after repenting his forthcoming actions to a bible. Despite his appearance, Three is quite carefree and often reads manga during his free time.^{[Animation ep 4]} He is also Art's teacher from the Facultas Academy.^{[Animation ep 7]} A former mercenary, Three once run an orphanage to raise the victims of those he killed so that one day they would have their revenge on him. However, an attack by an unknown group resulted in the orphanage being burned with the kids and Three getting scarred.^{[Animation ep 9]} In recovering from his shock, Three met a young Honey and promised to protect her life seeing that as a second chance.^{[Re: ep 4]} In Re: Hamatora he starts losing control of his mind when using his Minimum.^{[Re: ep 5]}

=== Police ===
Art (アート, Āto)
Voiced by: Hiroshi Kamiya (Japanese); Leraldo Anzaldua (English)
The superintendent of the Yokohama Police Department. Art is generally calm with a kind demeanor and possesses a strong sense of justice. He is old friends with Nice. Despite not being a Minimum Holder, he is a graduate from the Facultas Academy which he assisted with his late younger brother, Skill.^{[Re: ep 11]} In the case to arrest Moral, Art becomes conflicted due to his inability to produce a Minimum as well as the differences between him and Nice. Art is invited by Moral to join his cause in exchange of a Minimum as well as becoming Nice's equal, but he rejects him and is killed shortly afterwards.^{[Animation ep 7]} In the tenth episode his body is found and taken in by Moral's assistant Momoka.^{[Animation ep 10]} In episode twelve, Art reappears killing Moral much to Nice's confusion.^{[Animation ep 12]}
In Re: Hamatora it is revealed that Art possesses the Regeneration Minimum (再生のミニマム, Saisei no Minimamu), which triggers each time he receives a fatal injury in the heart, and allows him to recover from any wounds and even regrow lost limbs. He then dedicates himself to stealing any Minimum that he encounters, which he calls "collecting sins", in order to kill Nice.^{[Re: ep 2]} He eventually manages to accomplish his goal of erasing all Minimum Holders in Yokohama by triggering Hajime's anti-Minimum ability when seeing a seemingly dead Nice.^{[Re: ep 11]} However, his plans are ruined by the Minimum of his late brother, Skill, and he attempts to commit suicide when confronted by Nice. In the series' finale he and Nice reconcile their friendship.^{[Re: ep 12]}
Gasquet (ガスケ, Gasuke)

Voiced by: Yousuke Akimoto (Japanese); Luis Galindo (English)

An officer at the Yokohama Police Department with a keen interest in researching Minimum Holders. He is Art's partner, often concerned about his state.^{[Animation ep 7]} In Re: Hamatora he blames himself for his partner's actions.^{[Re: ep 2]} He is killed by Freemum's Minimum Holders while trying to confront Art.^{[Re: ep 5]}

=== Black Cosmos ===
Moral (モラル, Moraru)
Voiced by: Yūki Ono (Japanese); Chris Patton (English)
Moral is a graduate of the Facultas Academy and is the serial killer targeting Minimum Holders. He extracts the brains of his victims and stores them for use in creating non-innate Minimum Holders, i.e. artificially created Holders. Like a typical serial killer he possesses a severely warped mind, often personifying the physical brains of his victims, speaking to them and even going as far as to take them out for walks. His interest in researching the non-innate Minimum comes from his belief in the equality of people whereby all people should have access to Minimum abilities and hence would put an end to the stratification amongst the weak and strong in society.^{[Animation ep 3]} He is motivated by Nice whom he sees in flashbacks as an isolated person as a result of being the only strong person and wishes people become equal to him.^{[Animation ep 7]} His Transformation Minimum (変身のミニマム, Henshin no Minimamu) allows him to take on the appearance of other people.^{[Animation ep 6]} For his final showdown with Nice, he injects himself the Forbidden Minimum, the Type 0 Minimum (零式のミニマム, Rei Sheki no Minimamu) which allows him to warp. After being overwhelmed in combat, Moral is killed by Art.^{[Animation ep 12]}
Momoka (モモカ)
Voiced by: Megumi Ogata (Japanese); Carli Mosier (English)
Moral's ally and the owner of a flower shop. Her Minimum allows her to hack into computers and reach people whom Moral bestows Minimums. She is motivated to see the end of Moral's journey. She reappears in Re: Hamatora alongside Art and confronts Hajime. She actually is Saikyo, Freemum´s boss and sponsor. When Hajime erases all Minimums in Yokohama she kills herself, having lost all interest in the world.^{[Re: ep 12]}

=== Freemum ===
Ishigami Shunichi
The de facto leader of a group of Minimum Holders hiding in the club Freenum. He and his comrades seek to live freely without discrimination against Holders.^{[Re: ep 2]} For this purpose, they join forces with Art.^{[Re: ep 5]} His minimum makes liquids in boiling point (it includes water, blood) and it is activated when he put a bloodline under his eyesockets. However, when trying to put a coup, he is killed by Art to avenge Gasquet.^{[Re: ep 12]}
Mamiya
He possess the Decadence Minimum, which activates when someone eats the food that he makes, putting his victims in a frenzy state. He is an expert hacker. He is one of the Freemum remaining members that survives in the epilogue.
Goda
She possesses the String Minimum, however she lost it when Art stole it. She survives in the epilogue.
Suzuki
His minimum can produce perfect masks based in real faces, but it is only activated when he makes his victims (which his mask are based) scream in horror.
Masumoto
He uses a minimum that can increase the weight (gravity) in people and objects. His minimum is stolen by Art.^{[Re: ep 11]}
Suruga
He carries along a sock puppet in which he uses it to communicate with others due he uses a mouth gag in that keeps him from talk naturally. He has the Healing Minimum, which is said to be able to cure any disease or illness. It is activated when Suruga removes his mouth gag and touches an afflicted person. He has his minimum stolen by Art in Episode 10, however, he recovers his minimum in the final episode and is forced by Ratio to heal Birthday and Chiyo. He isn't with the remaining fugitive Freemum members in the epilogue.
Sakuraba
A Freemum member and a rap artist who communicates with hand signs mostly of the time. He possesses the Singing Minimum, for his activation, Sakuraba must keep silent for a period of 3 months. With the Singing Minimum, when Sakuraba sings, he has a circle of influence that spreads from him outward; its radius seemingly encompassing the city of Yokohama. Anyone who crosses out of this circle whilst he is still singing are killed whilst passing through. He is defeated by Hajime in Episode 11.

=== Others ===
Master (マスター, Masutā)
Voiced by: Atsushi Ono (Japanese); Carl Masterson (English)
The owner of the Nowhere Café. He rents out a table to Hamatora which acts as their office. He tends to show wisdom in the most unlikely of times.^{[Animation ep 1]} In Re: Hamatora, it is revealed he is a former member of the Minimum Agency and left the place swearing to protect one of their test subjects, Hajime, alongside Koneko.^{[Re: ep 11]}
Koneko (コネコ)
Voiced by: Kiyono Yasuno (Japanese); Nancy Novotny (English)
An employee of the Nowhere Cafe. Koneko acts as Hamatora's receptionist and contract negotiator. She receives job requests which she then explains and assigns to the members of the agency.^{[Animation ep 1]} In Re: Hamatora, it is revealed she is a former test subject of the Minimum Agency and was set free by Master who needed her aid.^{[Re: ep 11]}
Mao (マオ)
Voiced by: Takuya Eguchi (Japanese); Mike Yager (English)
The local information broker of Yokohama who seems to know everything happening around the city.^{[Animation ep 1]}
Theo (セオ, Seo)
Voiced by: Nobuhiko Okamoto (Japanese); Greg Ayres (English)
A student at Yokohamabane High School whose cool personality made him the target of severe bullying. Despite his appearance he has low self esteem and often contemplated suicide over his bullying while relying on his teacher for support. After hiring Nice to search for him, Theo learns the teacher was behind the bullyings and becomes one of Nice's friends.^{[Animation ep 2]}
Rei (レイ)
Voiced by: Ayaka Ohashi (Japanese); Juliet Simmons (English)
Another student at Yokohamabane High School and Theo's friend. The death of her teacher and Theo's depression causes her to join him in requesting Hamatora's help. In the end, she and Theo become one of their friends.^{[Animation ep 2]}
Chiyo
Voiced by: Ayami (Japanese); Kasi Hollowell (English)
A young artist friend of Birthday and Ratio. She describes her emotions with colors.^{[Animation ep 6]} She is later revealed to be a Minimum Holder with the capacity of camouflaging.^{[Animation ep 10]} In Re: Hamatora she joins the group Freemum to localize the person who has the Healing Minimum to cure Birthday´s illness; she was then captured and drugged by Mamiya´s minimum, however, in the final episode, she was healed, alongside Birthday, by Suruga´s Healing Minimum; and she was with Birthday and Ratio in Nowhere Cafe.
Takahiro Itou (伊藤 貴弘, Itou Takahiro)
Voiced by: Takahiro Mizushima (Japanese); Gabriel Regojo (English)
A young adult who makes a deal with Moral to gain a Minimum Holder. The experiment fails and Takahiro becomes a giant berserker who wishes to fight Nice.^{[Animation ep 3]} Following his defeat, Takahiro is arrested until he is freed by Moral's group. Takahiro requests to the Hamatora a way back to regain his original body which he first tries by going through a diet with Hajime.^{[Animation ep 10]} However, he then decides he will use his power to protect his mother from Minimum Holders attacking her. He is killed shortly afterwards by Moral.^{[Animation ep 11]}
Doktor
A member from the Minimum Agency who detests the Minimum Holders. He is also Honey's father and has a strained relationship with her daughter who chose to use her powers for a different objective than him.^{[Re: ep 4]}
Skill (スキル)
Voiced by: Mai Fuchigami (Japanese); Kalin Coates (English)
Art´s younger brother. He is dead during the series and appears only in flashbacks. These sequences reveal Skill went to Facultas with Art and Nice. Soon Facultas discovered Skill had the Ego Minimum which grants other people different Minimums. As a result, the Minimum Agency used Skill as a test subject to grant other individuals Minimums. Once Art found Skill, he was shocked to find that Skill had been attached to a machine by Facultas to facilitate use of his minimum. Skill indicates that they may have gone so far as to mutilate him to 'fit' the machine. Skill begs Art to kill him, and Art reluctantly obliges. Nevertheless, it´s revealed that Art hesitated kill his brother in a clean shot, and Moral realized that Skill´s heart still working, therefore, transplanting him to save child Nice´s life (who was dying in his and Hajime escape attempt the same night). Skill's Minimum appears to stay with Nice, saving his life in Re: Hamatora's finale, also recovering the other Minimums in the process.^{[Re: ep 12]}.

== Production ==
The anime series Hamatora: The Animation was announced in the 2013 50th issue of Shueisha's Young Jump magazine. The Nintendo 3DS game titled Hamatora: Look at Smoking World was announced in December 2013. Director Shuuhou Imai Imai was inspired by the DC Comics and Marvel Universe in the making of the game and hinted at the possibility of featuring a character from Tokyo Majin Gakuen.

The anime ended on March 25, 2014 with a "To Be Continued" sign. The next day, the official Hamatora Twitter account posted that the Hamatora project was still ongoing. The second series, titled Re:_Hamatora is air in July; most of the staff and cast returned, with NAZ taking an assistant animation role and main production taking place at Lerche.

=== Music ===
The music of the Hamatora anime is composed by Makoto Yoshimori. The Hamatora official soundtrack was released on March 26, 2014. Additionally, a series of "Character File" CDs are set to be released with the first two, respectively focused on Nice and Murasaki, on March 26, 2014. Each song explores a cast member's characterization as well as his or her relationship with other characters. The single "Hikari" was compared with the series by the singer himself based on the lyrics that talk about a "small miracle."

== Media ==
=== Manga ===
A manga series, Hamatora: The Comic, written by Yukino Kitajima and illustrated by Yūki Kodama began serialization in Shueisha's Young Jump magazine in November 2013. Its first tankōbon volume was released on February 19, 2014. The series is a prequel to the anime and focuses on Nice solving cases with Hajime while Murasaki works on bringing Nice back to the Facultas Academy.

| No. | Release date | ISBN |
|---|---|---|
| 1 | February 19, 2014 | 978-4-08-879665-9 |
1. "That Man, Nice" (その男、ナイス, Sono Otoko, Naisu); 2. "Where Did The Stray Go?" (野良はどこへいった, Nora wa Doko e Itta); 3. "It's Checkmate For You" (お前はもうツんでいる, Omae wa Mō Tsundeiru); 4. "Trouble is Flame Colored" (トラブルは炎の色, Toraburu wa Honoo no Iro); 5. "Rush In! Mafia Mansion!" (突入！マフィアの館！, Totsunyū! Mafia no Yakata!); 6. "Dotamba Getaway" (どたんばゲッタウェイ, Dotanba Gettawei); 7. "Darkness is Just a Step Away" (一寸先はダークネス, Issun Saki wa Dākunesu)
A graduate from the Facultas Academy gets the mission of making its top graduated member Nice return to them. These Facultas students have developed supernatural abilities known as Minimums and Nice demonstrates his one when capturing a pervert stalking his client during his detective business, Hamatora. Realizing he cannot defeat him in combat, Murasaki makes a bet to have Nice return to Facultas if he cannot capture one dangerous Minimum Holder. While Nice easily defeats him, his assistant Hajime takes care of another one by destroying Murasaki's car. In the next case, Nice is hired to rescue the Minimum Holder Shizuku from a group of kidnappers. For this Nice has Hajime taking care of the Yakuza, while he handles Shizuku. With Murasaki's reclutant help, Nice and Hajime succeed in saving Shizuku but are intercepted by duo known as Ratio and Birthday.
| 2 | July 18, 2014 | 978-4-08-879870-7 |
8. "Chinatown Wars" (チャイナタウン・ウォーズ, Chainataun Wōzu); 9. "A Small Miracle" (小さな奇跡, Chīsana Kiseki); 10. "Belief of Each" (それぞれの信念, Sorezore no Shinnen); 11. "If There are Those Who Believe" (信じるものかあるならば, Shinjirumono ka Aru Naraba); 12. "No More Wishes" (もはや願いは, Mohaya Negai wa); 13. "A New Day" (新しい日々, Atarashii Hibi); 14. "Give It Back! My Smartphone!" (かえして!私のスマホ!, Kaeshite! Watashi no Sumaho!)
| 3 | February 19, 2015 | 978-4-08-890119-0 |
15. "In a Locked Room" (インア・ロックド・ルーム, In'a Rokkudo Rūmu); 16. "The Pool is Not a Theft From the Beach"; 17. "Miracle's Blind Spot" (奇跡の死角, Kiseki no Shikaku); 18. "Suddenly Like a Flame" (突然炎のごとく, Totsuzenhonōnogotoku); 19. "The Case of the Renaissance"; 20. "The Last Chapter. Stand by Me"

=== Anime ===
An anime adaptation titled Hamatora: The Animation was announced in the 2013 50th issue of Shueisha's Young Jump magazine. The anime is produced by NAZ Animation Studio of Japan and began airing on TV Tokyo on January 8, 2014 with later airings on TVA, TVO and AT-X. While the anime ended on March 26, 2014, it has been hinted it would return in July 2014. The second season was titled Re: Hamatora Unlike the first season, it was produced at Studio Lerche.

The anime is chiefly directed by Seiji Kishi. In addition, Hiroshi Kimura is also directing the anime, along with series composers and script writers Jun Kumagai and Touko Machida. The soundtrack music is composed by Makoto Yoshimori. Character designs are done by Yū Wazu, based on the original character designs by Blood Lad's Yūki Kodama along with art direction by Fantasista Utamaro. The project was composed by Yukinori Kitajima. The story is set after the events of the manga, focusing on the already formed group of detectives known as Hamatora.

The series was simulcast-streamed by Crunchyroll with English subtitles in North America, Australia and other select parts of the world. Avex Group began releasing the series in Japan on Blu-ray and DVD volumes starting on April 25, 2014. The opening theme is "Flat" by Livetune feat. Yūki Ozaki. The ending theme is "Hikari" by Wataru Hatano.

There is also a radio program titled Hamatora From Cafe Nowhere (ハマトラジオ from カフェノーウェア) where voice actors often interact. In March 2015, a film and a new television series were announced.

Sentai Filmworks has licensed the first season for digital and home media release. The first season was released on Blu-ray and DVD on September 22, 2015 with both English and Japanese audio and English subtitles. Sentai Filmwworks has also licensed the second season for digital and home media release. The second season was released on Blu-ray and DVD on January 26, 2015.

=== Video game ===
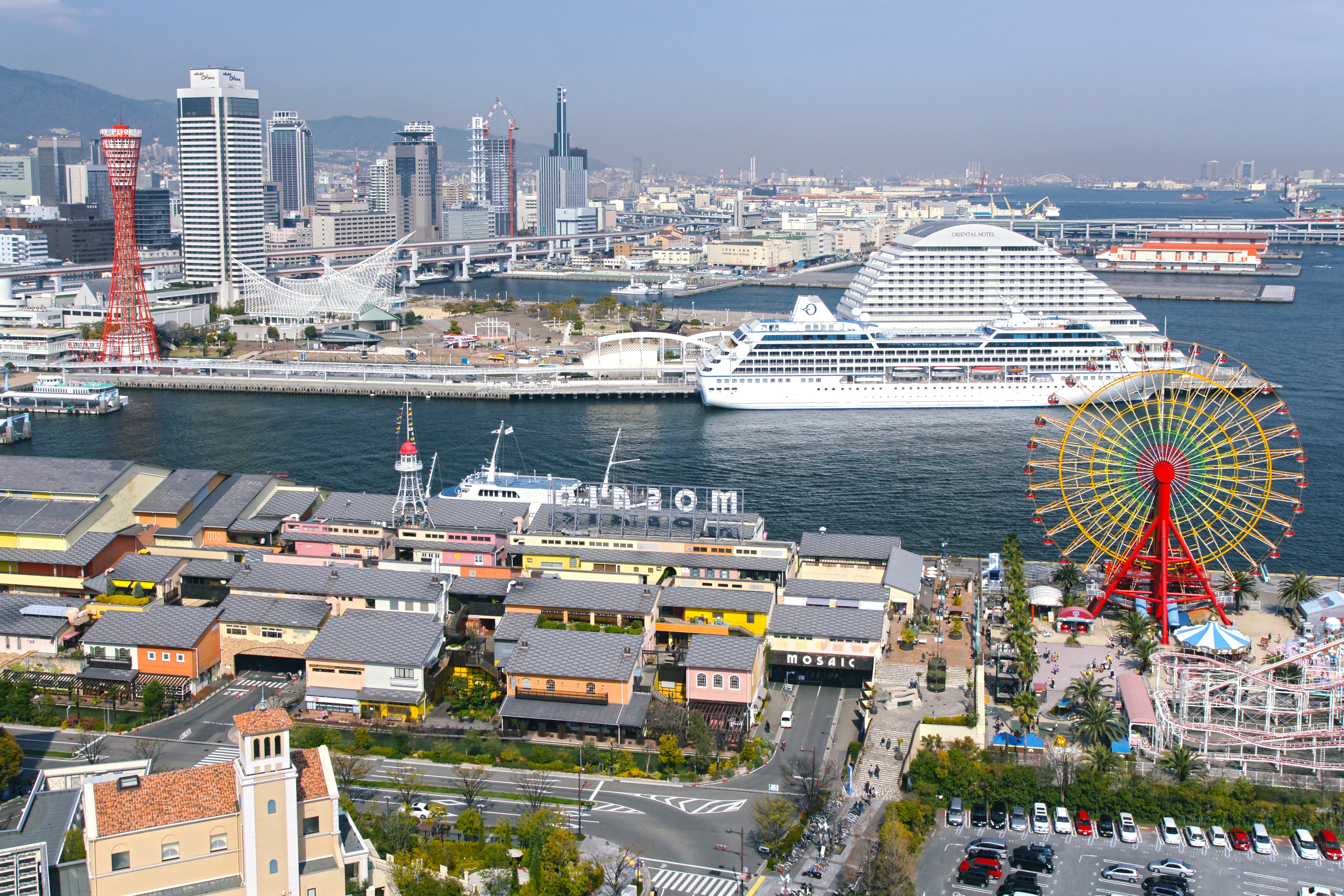
The game takes place in a port town of Kobe.

A Nintendo 3DS game developed by FuRyu titled Hamatora: Look at Smoking World was announced in December 2013. It was released in Japan on July 17, 2014. Directed by Shuuhou Imai, the game resemble the Tokyo Majin Gakuen role-playing game series. The combat is a turn based and require to input different commands to execute the Minimums. It takes place in the same fictional setting as both the Hamatora manga and anime but featuring a new story. It was made so that newcomers to the franchise will have access to it.

Set in a port town of Kobe, the protagonist is a transfer student named Souken who awakens his own Minimum and starts participating in fights against other students. Certain shopping districts were modeled after real-life areas, which the player will be able to see in stereoscopic 3D. The main cast from the Hamatora anime and manga series is also set to appear in the game. Preorders of the game include a Honey IC Sticker Card, that was designed using Honey's tablet from the anime as a motif.

=== Stage play ===
In August 2014, the production company Eigeki ran a Hamatora play for 12 performances from August 16 to August 24 at the Haiyūza Theater Roppongi in Tokyo. Titled Hamatora The Stage: Crossing Time, the play focused on the Hamatora team aiding Art in solving a murder case.

=== Novel ===
A novelization titled Hamatora the Novel by Kenichi Fujiwara was to be published by Shueisha in July 2014.

== Reception ==
Reactions to the first episode of Hamatora have been between mixed between positive and average. UK Anime Network called it "slick and stylish" and commented it could be one of the season's surprises. The pilot was noted for the way it connected multiple stories and its distinctive use of animations. Brad Rice from Japanator mentioned he was attracted by the show and was curious about how the characters would be portrayed. Chris Beveridge from Fandom Post noted that while it had several good moments, the characters had yet to bring an impact to him. Multiple writers from Anime News Network showed several opinions about the series' first episode which went from positive to one simply saying she did not care about it.

Nicole MacLean from THEM Anime Reviews called it a "fun watch" while noting similarities with the comic book series X-Men. She believes "it isn't a series I regret watching, for its early self-contained episodes function as a good if pedestrian detective series, and it is certainly pretty to look at." Similarly, Richard Eisenbeis from Kotaku praised the series for the appeal of superhero power used by business people who would appeal to the audience. He noted fans of the X-Men might enjoy the series. Despite praising the threat Moral poses to Nice due to how he is a foil, Eisenbeis criticized some of the dark parts from the series as well as its anticlimactic finale. Carl Kimlinger from Anime News Network was more critical of the series as despite praising its action scenes and comedy, he panned the series' plot and animation. Re: Hamatora was praised by Chris Beveridge due to its themes portrayed and the similarities between the series and other Western series. He additionally praised both Hamatora and the sequel for its portrayal of the lead characters as well as the English actors.

The first DVD of the series sold 1,454 units in two days after its release. In 2014, The 19th Animation Kobe committee chose director Seiji Kishi to receive their Individual Award for the stretch of his career including Danganronpa: The Animation, Arpeggio of Blue Steel, and Hamatora.
