= Kamishikimi Kumanoimasu Shrine =

Shinto shrine in Japan

- 上色見熊野座神社
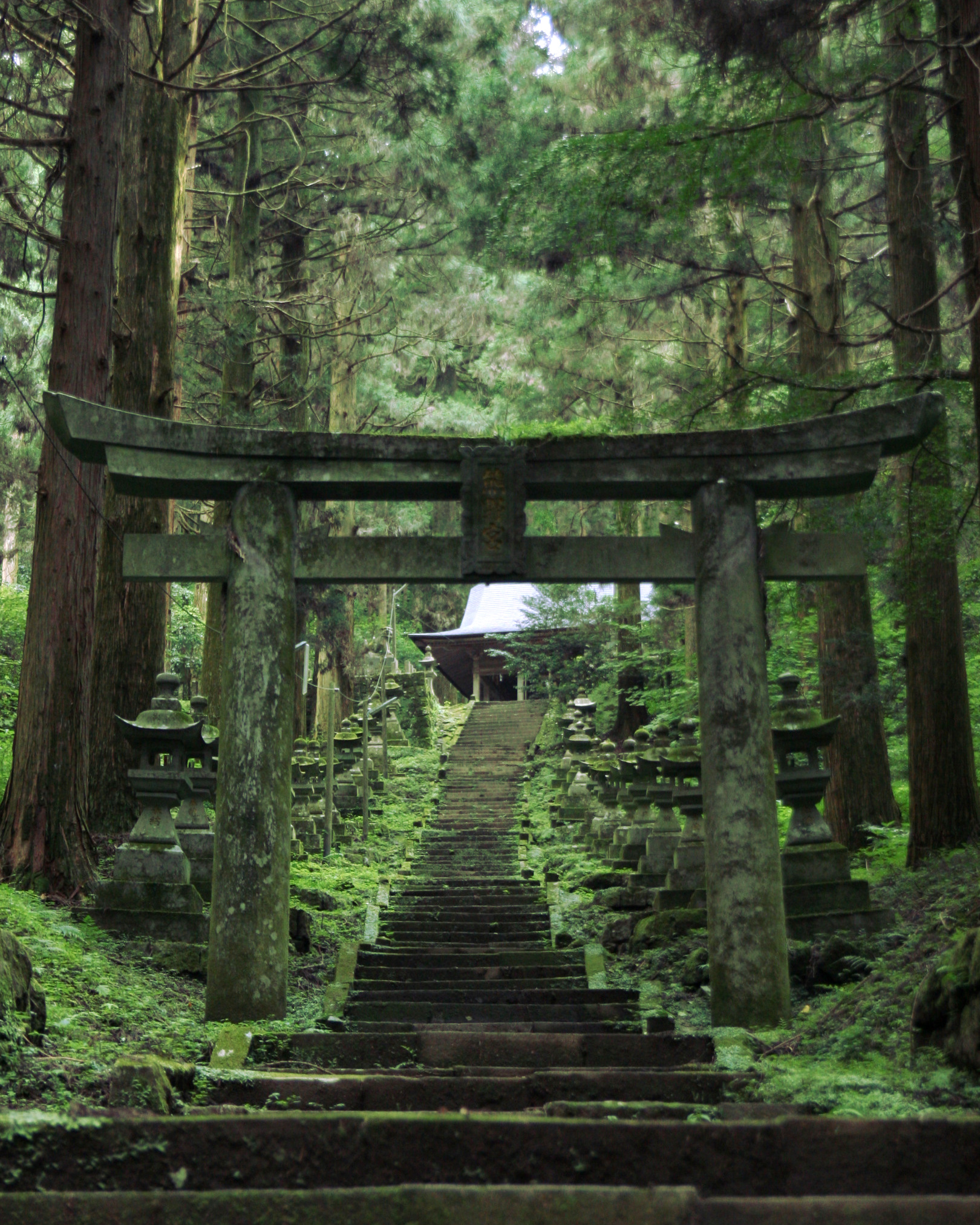

- Location within Japan Location within Kumamoto Prefecture

Religion
- Affiliation: Shinto
- Deity: Izanagi-no-Mikoto and Izanami-no-Mikoto
- Type: Shinto Shrine

Location
- Location: Takamori, Kumamoto Prefecture, Japan
- Interactive map of Kamishikimi Kumanoimasu Shrine
- Coordinates: 32°51′16.2″N 131°09′31.2″E

Architecture
- Style: Shinto shrine style
- Established: 14th century

Kamishikimi Kumanoimasu Shrine (上色見熊野座神社, Kamishikimi Kumano-imasu-jinja) is a Shinto Shrine in Takamori, Kumamoto Prefecture, Japan. This shrine is famous for being the setting of a popular anime and manga comic Hotarubi no Mori e.

== History ==
The history of this shrine is unknown. It is said that the shrine started to offer ritual service in 14th century. According to local legend, Kamishikimi Kumanoimasu Shrine is dedicated to the creator gods Izanagi-no-Mikoto and Izanami-no-Mikoto from Japanese mythology.

The original shrine was burned down by the flames of war in 16th century and current shrine was rebuilt in 1722. The shrine is believed to bring good luck in marriage.

== Ugeto-iwa stone ==
Behind the main hall is a large sacred stone called Ugeto-iwa; in Japanese mythology it was kicked and a 10-meter hole was made by Kihachi, a follower of the god Takeiwatatsu-no-mikoto, who created Mount Aso. It's thought worshiping there brings success and victory.

== Gallery ==
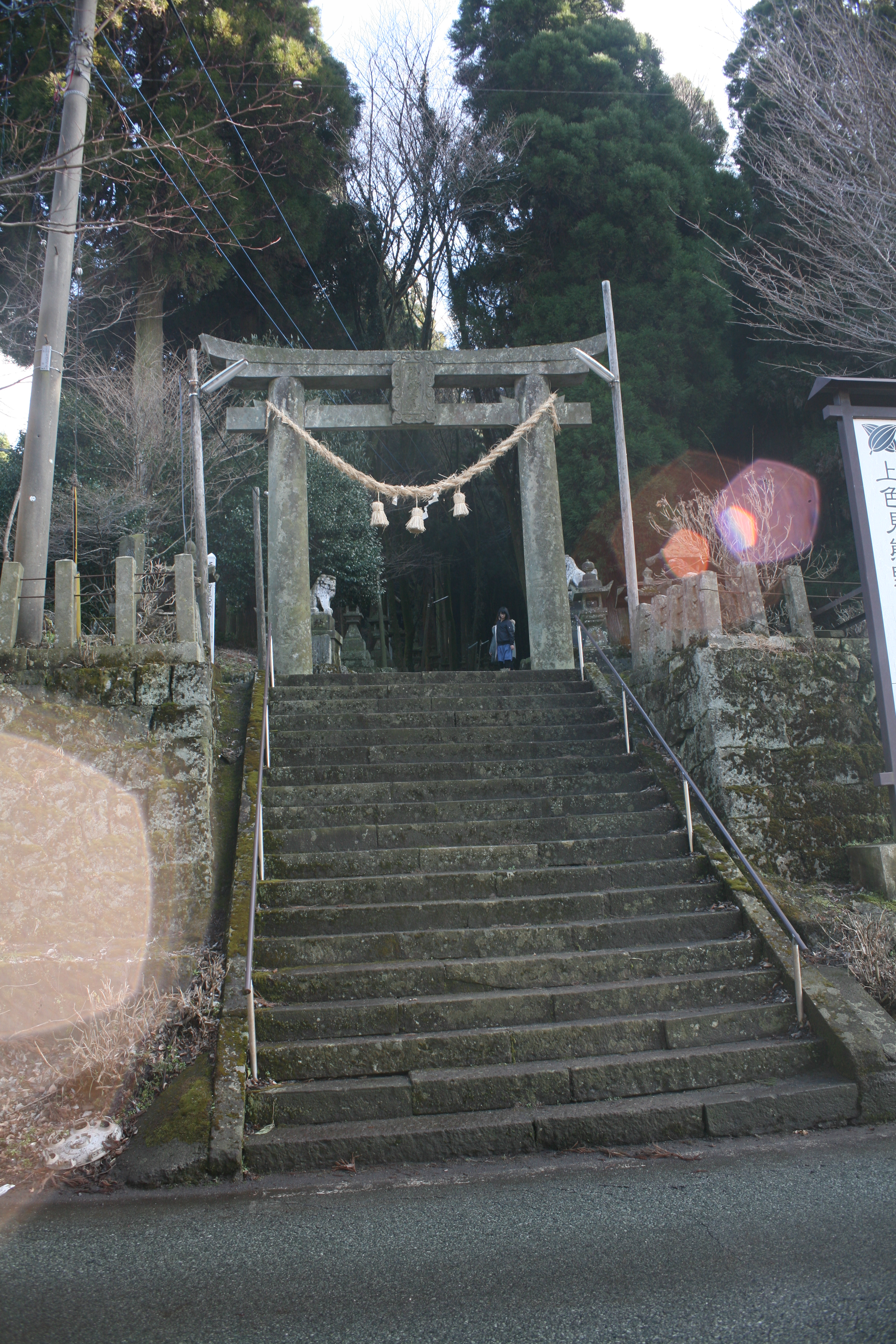
The gate of the shrine

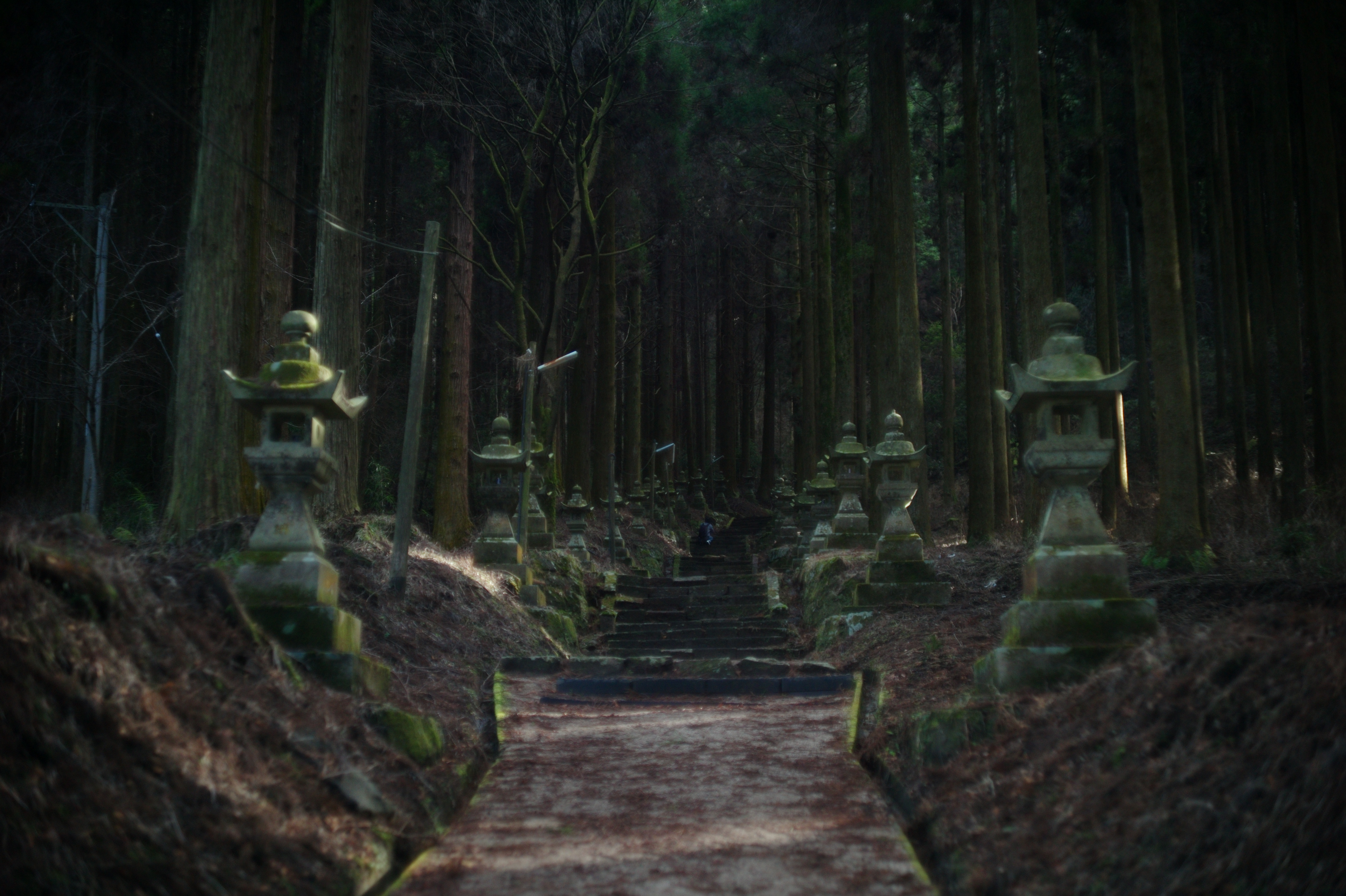
The path to the shrine

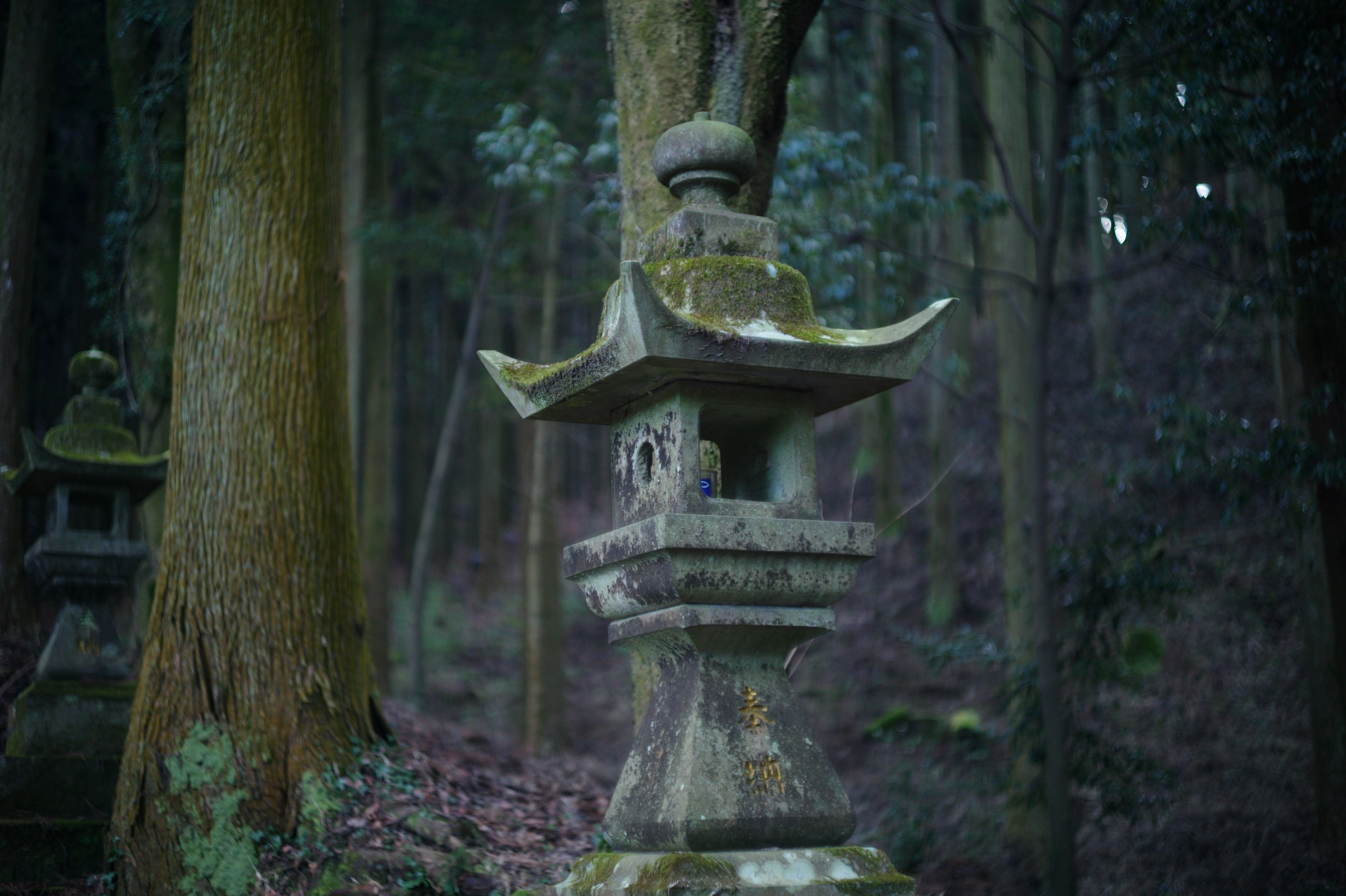
The stone lanterns
