= Takahiro Omori =

Japanese animator, storyboard writer, and director (born 1965)

Takahiro Omori 大森 貴弘
- Born: 大森 貴弘 (Omori Takahiro); June 25, 1965 (age 61); Tokyo, Japan
- Occupations: Director, Storyboard writer, Animator
- Years active: 1984–present

Takahiro Omori (大森 貴弘, Ōmori Takahiro) (born June 25, 1965) is a Japanese animator, storyboard writer, and director. He has directed many anime series, including Fancy Lala, Koi Kaze, Gakuen Alice, Hell Girl, Natsume's Book of Friends, Baccano!, Durarara!! and Samurai Flamenco.

== Filmography ==
1988

- Metal Skin Panic MADOX-01: Key Animation

1996

- Baby and Me: Director, Storyboard

1997

- Hyper Police: Director

1998

- Fancy Lala: Series Director, Storyboard, Episode Director
- Yoiko: Director

1999

- Power Stone: Director, Storyboard

2002

- Haibane Renmei: Storyboard, Episode Director

2003

- Wonder Bevil: Director

2004

- Koi Kaze: Director
- Gakuen Alice: Director, Storyboard, Script

2005

- Hell Girl: Director, Dubbing Director

2006

- Hell Girl: Two Mirrors: Director, Dubbing Director

2007

- Baccano!: Director, Storyboard, Episode Director

2008

- Natsume's Book of Friends: Director

2009

- Natsume's Book of Friends Two: Director

2010

- Durarara!!: Director
- Princess Jellyfish: Director

2011

- Hotarubi no Mori e: Director
- Natsume's Book of Friends Three: Director

2012

- Natsume's Book of Friends Four: Director

2013

- Samurai Flamenco: Director

2015

- Durarara!!×2: Director

2016

- Natsume's Book of Friends Five: Chief Director

2017

- Natsume's Book of Friends Six: Chief Director
- Hell Girl: The Fourth Twilight: Director

2018

- Natsume's Book of Friends the Movie: Ephemeral Bond: Chief Director

2020

- Pet: Director

2021

- Natsume's Book of Friends: The Waking Rock and the Strange Visitor: Chief Director
- Eiga Sumikko Gurashi: Aoi Tsukiyo no Mahō no Ko
