= Natsume's Book of Friends =

Japanese manga series and its adaptations

- First tankōbon volume cover, featuring Takashi Natsume (back) and Madara/Nyanko-sensei (front)

夏目友人帳 (Natsume Yūjin-chō)
- Genre: Iyashikei; Mystery; Supernatural
- Manga
- Written by: Yuki Midorikawa
- Published by: Hakusensha
- English publisher: NA: Viz Media
- Imprint: Hana to Yume Comics
- Magazine: LaLa DX (2003–2008); LaLa (2007–present)
- Original run: June 10, 2003 – present
- Volumes: 33
- Anime television series
- Directed by: Takahiro Omori (Note: Credited as Chief Director (総監督) from episode 53 onwards); Kotomi Deai (53–74); Hideki Ito (75–86)
- Produced by: Ayako Yokoyama; Akiko Odawara (1–13); Masanori Miyake (1–26); Ikuhide Ichikawa (1–26); Sayako Muramatsu (14–26, 53–74); Tomomi Kyōtani (27–52); Reiko Sasaki (27–52); Hirofumi Sugawara (27–52); Fumi Yazaki (53–74); Kazuya Satō (53–74)
- Written by: Kenichi Kanemaki (1–26); Sadayuki Murai (27–86)
- Music by: Makoto Yoshimori
- Studio: Brain's Base (1–52); Shuka (53–86)
- Licensed by: Crunchyroll
- Original network: TXN (TV Tokyo)
- Original run: July 8, 2008 – December 24, 2024
- Episodes: 87
- Original video animation
- Directed by: Takahiro Omori (chief); Kotomi Deai
- Produced by: Ayako Yokoyama; Tomomi Kyōtani; Tomoko Taneoka; Reiko Sasaki
- Written by: Takahiro Omori (1); Aya Yoshinaga (2)
- Music by: Makoto Yoshimori
- Studio: Brain's Base
- Licensed by: Crunchyroll (1)
- Released: December 15, 2013 – February 1, 2014
- Runtime: 22–23 minutes
- Episodes: 2
- Original video animation
- Directed by: Takahiro Omori (chief); Kotomi Deai
- Music by: Makoto Yoshimori
- Studio: Shuka
- Licensed by: Crunchyroll
- Released: March 22, 2017 – October 25, 2017
- Runtime: 22–23 minutes
- Episodes: 4
- Original net animation
- Studio: Shuka
- Released: April 21, 2021
- Runtime: 2 minutes
- Anime films
- Ephemeral Bond; The Waking Rock and the Strange Visitor
- icon

Natsume's Book of Friends (Japanese: 夏目友人帳, Hepburn: Natsume Yūjin-chō) is a Japanese manga series written and illustrated by Yuki Midorikawa. It started in Hakusensha's shōjo manga magazine LaLa DX in June 2003, where it ran until April 2008; it has been serialized in LaLa since July 2007. Its chapters have been collected in 33 tankōbon volumes as of April 2026. The manga is licensed for English release in North America by Viz Media, which released the first volume in January 2010.

The series follows Takashi Natsume, an orphan boy in his late teens who can perceive and combat yōkai. One day, Natsume finds a very old notebook called the "Book of Friends", left by his late maternal grandmother Reiko, who shared similar abilities and was widely known among local yōkai to possess strong spiritual powers. The notebook was used to bind dozens of powerful demonic spirits, both good and evil, to follow Reiko's every whim and desire if called upon. Natsume resolves to give back all the names in notebook; in the process, he joins forces with another feline/wolf-like spirit called Madara (nicknamed "Nyanko-sensei"), who knew Reiko when she was alive. Madara takes the form of an overweight cat and intends to take back the notebook after Natsume dies. Until then, he agrees to protect Natsume from the nefarious spirits who want to harm him for being the grandson of Reiko.

The series has been adapted into a series drama CDs. An anime television series adaptation, produced by Brain's Base (seasons 1–4) and Shuka (seasons 5 onwards), have been broadcast on TV Tokyo in 2008, 2009, 2011, 2012, 2016, 2017, and 2024. Two anime films, Natsume's Book of Friends the Movie and Natsume's Book of Friends: The Waking Rock and the Strange Visitor, were released in 2018 and 2021, respectively. The first four seasons of the anime were licensed by NIS America for a North American release in 2012 and released on home video in Japanese with English subtitles. The series has also been streamed by Crunchyroll, who produced an English dub in 2022.

By September 2023, the manga had over 16 million copies in circulation.

== Story ==
For as long as he can remember, Takashi Natsume has had the rare spiritual ability to see and commune with yōkai and ayakashi, inheriting the powers from his late maternal grandmother, Reiko. This ability resulted in his having a lonely childhood, because children his age considered him strange. He had also been passed from one paternal relative to another. Upon her death at a young adult age, Reiko bequeathed to her grandson her "Book of Friends"—a book containing the names of hundreds of spirits she had bullied into servitude.

The Book of Friends is considered a highly prized item in the supernatural world, and such demons and spirits—both good and malicious—hunt Natsume constantly because of it. Natsume spends his time dissolving the contracts that Reiko created and releasing the various spirits that come to him. Malicious spirits, on the other hand, try to kill him to obtain possession of the book, which is where Madara (called "Nyanko-sensei" by Natsume) comes in. Madara serves as Natsume's bodyguard and spiritual advisor of sorts, even though he is ostensibly motivated by his own desire to possess the book once Natsume dies. He later begins to become more attached to Natsume, with the latter forming a similar bond with Madara (despite the latter's attempts to deny it).

Natsume also finds a good friend in an exorcist named Shuuichi Natori, who is also one of the very few humans who is capable of perceiving and taking down spirits via certain banishing or sealing spells, but also finds a dangerous adversary in Seiji Matoba, who has plans for Natsume to join him and his nefarious clan of exorcists. Natsume is determined to release all of the names before the conniving Matoba clan or other malicious spirits attempt to use it for their own gain as he tries to learn whatever he can about his maternal grandmother and the strong spiritual connection they share.

== Characters ==
=== Main characters ===
Takashi Natsume (夏目 貴志, Natsume Takashi)
Voiced by: Hiroshi Kamiya, Ayumi Fujimura (young) (Japanese); Adam Gibbs, Paige Guillory (young) (English)
High school student Takashi Natsume inherits his grandmother Reiko's ability to see yōkai and receives her "Book of Friends," a ledger containing names of ayakashi she subdued. The book's power to control spirits makes it coveted by both yōkai seeking freedom and exorcists pursuing its power. Many spirits confuse Natsume for Reiko, leading to both conflict and unexpected connections. The yōkai Madara protects him in exchange for inheriting the book after Natsume's death, while he works to return the spirits' names. Though raised by reluctant relatives due to his spiritual sight, he finds stability with the Fujiwaras while concealing his abilities. Despite his peaceful nature, Natsume possesses strong spiritual power that attracts attention, particularly from exorcist Seiji Matoba. Each name he releases drains his energy but grants him visions of the spirits' pasts, revealing more about Reiko's life.
Madara (斑) / "Nyanko-sensei" (ニャンコ先生; "Master Kitty-Cat")
Voiced by: Kazuhiko Inoue, Sanae Kobayashi (as high school girl) (Japanese); Christopher Wehkamp (English)
Madara is a powerful inugami accidentally released by Natsume from long confinement in a shrine. Normally appearing as a maneki-neko (which Natsume nicknames Nyanko-sensei), this form allows him to be visible to humans, requiring Natsume to pass him off as a pet. Though contracted to protect Natsume in exchange for inheriting the Book of Friends upon the boy's death, Madara frequently complains when names are returned from the book. Their relationship involves frequent quarrels, yet gradually develops mutual affection. Despite his protests about being treated like a cat, Madara exhibits feline behaviors. His connection to Natsume deepens through their shared history with Reiko, whom Madara knew well before her untimely death. Nyanko's design is based on a lucky cat statue Midorikawa was given as a child.
Reiko Natsume (夏目 レイコ, Natsume Reiko)
Voiced by: Sanae Kobayashi (Japanese); Alexis Tipton (English)
Reiko, Natsume's late maternal grandmother, was a powerful spiritualist who distanced herself from humans and sought companionship among spirits. She collected the false names of defeated yōkai in her Book of Friends, compelling their obedience. Though she commanded most spirits, she maintained an unusual rapport with Madara. Described as forgetful with poor manners, Reiko died young beneath a tree, fading from human memory as she desired. Her formidable spiritual power continues to resonate in the supernatural world, attracting both fear and fascination from yōkai and exorcists alike—a legacy now inherited by her grandson Natsume, who possesses comparable abilities.

=== Yowake High School ===
Kaname Tanuma (田沼 要, Tanuma Kaname)
Voiced by: Kazuma Horie (Japanese); Tyson Rinehart (English)
An student that had recently moved into the area. He is sickly and quite susceptible to illnesses. Like Natsume, he is able to detect spirits, but to a lesser degree limited to seeing merely shadows and sensing slight presence of spirits. He wants to help Natsume in any way he can, but is afraid that he will just be a burden because of his weak ability. He became a close companion and even knew about Natsume's secret of seeing spirits and always helped him whenever he is in a tight spot.
Touru Taki (多軌 透, Taki Tōru)
Voiced by: Rina Satō (Japanese); Megan Shipman (English)
A new girl at school who rarely talks because of a curse a spirit has placed on her, which Natsume later helps her to break. She is an onmyouji; she cannot see spirits without drawing a magic circle. Taki, like Tanuma, wants to help Natsume in any way possible. She has an older brother who is staying at university and flatly refuses to believe that yōkai even exist.
Jun Sasada (笹田 純, Sasada Jun)
Voiced by: Miyuki Sawashiro (Japanese); Marisa Duran (English)
The class president of Natsume's homeroom. Sasada believes that Natsume can see, hear and battle spirits, although he repeatedly denies this to her. To Natsume's chagrin, she frequently tries to accompany him when he is on business involving spirits. She is a recurring character in the anime; in the manga, she is rarely seen after the encounter with Shigure due to transferring to another school from her stepfather's new job.
Atsushi Kitamoto (北本 篤史, Kitamoto Atsushi) and Satoru Nishimura (西村 悟, Nishimura Satoru)
Voiced by: Hisayoshi Suganuma and Ryōhei Kimura (Japanese); Mike Haimoto and Matthew Elkins (English)
A classmates of Natsume. Kitamoto is a sensible and rational person, while Nishimura is funny and easy-going, with a slightly perverted side. Although Natsume initially rejects their overtures of friendship because of his fears of his ability being found out, he eventually becomes friends with them, although they still hang around more with each other than Natsume. Nishimura has a crush on Taki, but thinks that she and Natsume are going out.

=== Exorcists ===
Shuuichi Natori (名取 周一, Natori Shūichi)
Voiced by: Akira Ishida, Fuyuka Oura (young) (Japanese); Aaron Roberts (English)
An exorcist and actor who possesses spiritual sight, marked by a moving lizard birthmark. He controls three spirits and employs paper shikigami, using harsh methods rooted in childhood trauma that contrast with Natsume's compassion. While maintaining his techniques, he grows concerned about Natsume's merciful nature toward hostile spirits and exorcists, despite recognizing his superior power. Learning of the Book of Friends, he deems it dangerous but accepts Natsume's choice to keep it.
Seiji Matoba (的場 静司, Matoba Seiji)
Voiced by: Junichi Suwabe (Japanese); Reagan Murdock (English)
Seiji Matoba leads his clan as a formidable exorcist who prioritizes human protection above all else. His pragmatic approach includes sacrificing innocent yōkai when necessary. A distinctive eye patch covers his scarred right eye – a hereditary curse from a broken pact between his ancestor and a powerful yōkai. This legacy brings both supernatural targeting and distrust from rival clans. Upon discovering Natsume's lineage as Reiko's grandson, he actively seeks to recruit him, recognizing his exceptional spiritual potential.
Nanase (七瀬)
Voiced by: Mika Doi, Yoriko Nagata (young) (Japanese); Laurie Steele (English)
An elder member of the Matoba clan who serves as the current head's secretary and assistant.

=== Recurring yōkai ===
Hiiragi (柊)
Voiced by: Satsuki Yukino (Japanese); Jill Harris (English)
"Chukyu A" / One-Eyed Middle Class Yōkai (一つ目の中級妖怪, Hitotsume no Chūkyū Yōkai) and "Chukyu B" / Ox-Faced Middle Class Yōkai (牛顔の中級妖怪, Ushi-gao no Chūkyū Yōkai)
Voiced by: Takashi Matsuyama and Hiroshi Shimozaki (Japanese); Brian Mathis and Greg Dulcie (English)
Hinoe (ヒノエ)
Voiced by: Akemi Okamura (Japanese); Molly Searcy (English)
A powerful yōkai whose form is a blue-haired human woman. She was madly in love with Reiko. Being knowledgeable, she often acts as Natsume's mentor. Hinoe enjoys teasing Natsume and Madara; mostly the former because of his uncanny resemblance to Reiko.
Misuzu (三篠)
Voiced by: Takaya Kuroda (Japanese); Chris Ryan (English)
A powerful horse yōkai with many followers. He acknowledges that Natsume is a worthy holder of the Book of Friends and offers himself as Natsume's bodyguard in place of Madara.
Kappa (カッパ)
Voiced by: Kyōko Chikiri (Japanese); Danielle Yoshiko Phillips (English)
Little Fox (子狐, Kogitsune)
Voiced by: Akiko Yajima (Japanese); Kristen McGuire (English)
An orphaned fox yōkai whose form is a boy with fox ears and tail however humans only see him as an infant fox. He becomes friends with Natsume after being rescued from bullying yōkai.
Chobihige (ちょびひげ)
Voiced by: Chō (Japanese); Barry Yandell (English)
A large-headed spirit with a small mustache and a pale green robe. He wears a comb that he had lost and is replaced by a dragon scale-encrusted comb Natsume had made for him. His true form is that of a dragon.

=== Other characters ===
Tōko Fujiwara (藤原 塔子, Fujiwara Tōko) and Shigeru Fujiwara (藤原 滋, Fujiwara Shigeru)
Voiced by: Miki Itō and Eiji Itō (Japanese); Jennifer AuBuchon and Seth Magill (English)
The Fujiwaras, a childless middle-aged couple, become Natsume's foster parents. Shigeru, a second cousin of Natsume's late father, once unknowingly met Reiko in his youth. They wholeheartedly accept Natsume as family and frequently express concern for his wellbeing. Though Natsume consciously maintains emotional distance – addressing them formally and concealing his spiritual abilities – he gradually realizes this prevents deeper bonds. Despite his growing comfort with them, he continues to fear rejection should they discover his supernatural connection to the yōkai world.
Katsumi Shibata (柴田 克己, Shibata Katsumi)
Voiced by: Yoshimasa Hosoya (Japanese); Justin Briner (English)
A classmate of Natsume in elementary school. He used to bully Natsume and refused to believe in his spiritual abilities. After falling in love with a yōkai, and eventually realizing that she was indeed one thanks to Natsume, he apologizes to him and become friends.

== Production ==
Manga author Yuki Midorikawa created Natsume's Book of Friends as an episodic serial for a manga magazine published every two months, so that each chapter was a story that could be read on its own. As the result of earlier writing a ghost story that an editor made her revise to include more romance than she initially wanted, Midorikawa specifically created Natsume's Book of Friends as a supernatural story with less romance, containing supernatural elements that stir readers' imaginations the way stories about yōkai and local gods stirred hers while growing up in a rural area. For the basic story, she wanted to write about a boy and his non-human teacher, and include the incongruous element of the boy's grandmother in a school uniform.

This was the first series Midorikawa wrote in which the protagonist was also the central character. Midorikawa claimed that as a character, Takashi is almost as bad as herself at expressing his thoughts, which caused her to use more interior monologue than she was comfortable with for a male character.

== Media ==
=== Manga ===
Written and illustrated by Yuki Midorikawa, Natsume's Book of Friends was first published in Hakusensha's shōjo manga magazine LaLa DX from June 10, 2003, to April 10, 2008; (Note: Published until the magazine's May 2008 issue, released on April 10 of the same year.) it has been serialized in the monthly sister magazine LaLa since July 24, 2007. The chapters have been collected in 33 tankōbon volumes.

The series is licensed in English in North America by Viz Media, with the first volume published in January 2010.

Additionally, fanbook was published on January 5, 2009, and a notebook reproduction of Natsume's Book of Friends was published on July 3, 2009.

==== Volumes ====
No.	Original release date	Original ISBN	English release date	English ISBN
1	October 5, 2005	978-4-592-17158-4	January 6, 2010	978-1-4215-3243-1
2	August 5, 2006	978-4-592-17159-1	April 6, 2010	978-1-4215-3244-8
3	February 5, 2007	978-4-592-18446-1	July 6, 2010	978-1-4215-3245-5
4	August 4, 2007	978-4-592-18447-8	October 5, 2010	978-1-4215-3246-2
5	March 5, 2008	978-4-592-18448-5	January 4, 2011	978-1-4215-3247-9
6	July 5, 2008	978-4-592-18449-2	April 5, 2011	978-1-4215-3248-6
7	January 5, 2009	978-4-592-18667-0	June 7, 2011	978-1-4215-3274-5
8	July 3, 2009	978-4-592-18668-7	August 2, 2011	978-1-4215-3592-0
9	January 4, 2010	978-4-592-18669-4	October 4, 2011	978-1-4215-3887-7
10	July 5, 2010	978-4-592-18670-0	December 6, 2011	978-1-4215-3939-3
11	March 4, 2011	978-4-592-19361-6	February 7, 2012	978-1-4215-4122-8
12	July 5, 2011	978-4-592-19362-3	July 3, 2012	978-1-4215-4231-7
13	January 4, 2012	978-4-592-19363-0	December 4, 2012	978-1-4215-4923-1
14	July 5, 2012	978-4-592-19364-7	July 2, 2013	978-1-4215-5375-7
15	January 4, 2013	978-4-592-19365-4	January 7, 2014	978-1-4215-5967-4
16	July 5, 2013	978-4-592-19366-1	June 3, 2014	978-1-4215-6782-2
17	January 4, 2014	978-4-592-19367-8	October 7, 2014	978-1-4215-7524-7
18	September 5, 2014	978-4-592-19368-5	June 2, 2015	978-1-4215-8024-1
19	May 1, 2015	978-4-592-19369-2	January 5, 2016	978-1-4215-8248-1
20	April 5, 2016	978-4-592-19370-8	March 7, 2017	978-1-4215-9162-9
21	October 10, 2016	978-4-592-19371-5	January 2, 2018	978-1-4215-9587-0
22	September 5, 2017	978-4-592-19372-2	October 2, 2018	978-1-4215-9653-2
23	September 5, 2018	978-4-592-19373-9	October 1, 2019	978-1-9747-0769-0
24	May 2, 2019	978-4-592-19374-6	June 2, 2020	978-1-9747-1199-4
25	June 5, 2020	978-4-592-19375-3	April 6, 2021	978-1-9747-2119-1
26	January 4, 2021	978-4-592-19376-0	December 7, 2021	978-1-9747-2573-1
27	September 3, 2021	978-4-592-19377-7	November 1, 2022	978-1-9747-3241-8
28	May 2, 2022	978-4-592-19378-4	May 2, 2023	978-1-9747-3692-8
29	January 4, 2023	978-4-592-19379-1	February 6, 2024	978-1-9747-4325-4
30	September 5, 2023	978-4-592-19380-7	November 5, 2024	978-1-9747-4953-9
31	September 5, 2024	978-4-592-22201-9	August 5, 2025	978-1-9747-5598-1
32	April 4, 2025	978-4-592-22202-6	May 5, 2026	978-1-9747-6337-5
33	April 3, 2026	978-4-592-22203-3	—	—

=== Drama CDs ===
Natsume's Book of Friends has been adapted as a series of three drama CDs, which were distributed as extras with issues of LaLa.

1. LaLa Treasure Drama CD (October 2007)
2. LaLa Excellent Drama CD (November 2008)
3. LaLa Double Premiere Drama CD (May 2009)

=== Anime ===
Natsume's Book of Friends has been adapted into an anime television series, directed by Takahiro Omori, and broadcast on TV Tokyo. Brain's Base animated the first four seasons, while Shuka has animated the fifth one onwards. The 13-episode first season was broadcast from July 8 to September 30, 2008; (Note: TV Tokyo listed the air dates for the series on Monday at 25:00, which is effectively Tuesday at 1:00 a.m. JST.) the second 13-episode season, Zoku Natsume Yūjin-chō (続 夏目友人帳; "Natsume's Book of Friends (Continuation)"), was broadcast from January 6 to March 31, 2009; (Note: TV Tokyo listed the air dates for the series on Monday at 25:00, which is effectively Tuesday at 1:00 a.m. JST.) the third 13-episode season, Natsume Yūjin-chō San (夏目友人帳 参), was broadcast from July 5 to September 27, 2011; (Note: TV Tokyo listed the air dates for the series on Monday at 25:30, which is effectively Tuesday at 1:30 a.m. JST.) the 13-episode fourth season, Natsume Yūjin-chō Shi (夏目友人帳 肆), was broadcast from January 3 to March 27, 2012; (Note: TV Tokyo listed the air dates for the series on Monday at 25:30, which is effectively Tuesday at 1:30 a.m. JST.) the fifth 11-episode season, Natsume Yūjin-Chō Go (夏目友人帳 伍), was broadcast from October 5 to December 21, 2016; (Note: TV Tokyo listed the air dates for the series on Tuesday at 25:35, which is effectively Wednesday at 1:35 a.m. JST.) the sixth 11-episode season, Natsume Yūjin-chō Roku (夏目友人帳 陸), was broadcast from April 12 to June 21, 2017; (Note: TV Tokyo listed the air dates for the series on Tuesday at 25:35, which is effectively Wednesday at 1:35 a.m. JST.) the seventh 12-episode season, Natsume Yūjin-chō Shichi (夏目友人帳 漆), aired from October 8 to December 24, 2024. (Note: TV Tokyo listed the air dates for the series on Monday at 24:00, which is effectively Tuesday at midnight JST.)

In North America, the first four seasons were licensed by NIS America and released on home video in Japanese with English subtitles. The seven seasons have been streamed by Crunchyroll. An English dub by Crunchyroll premiered on July 24, 2022.

=== Films ===
Natsume's Book of Friends the Movie: Ephemeral Bond was released in theaters on September 29, 2018.

A second theatrical anime, titled Natsume's Book of Friends: The Waking Rock and the Strange Visitor, premiered on January 16, 2021. The film is composed of two stories, "Ishi Okoshi" and "Ayashiki Raihōsha". The main staff and cast members from the previous film returned to reprise their roles with the addition of Hisako Kanemoto as a guest-star.

=== Other ===
An original video animation (OVA) titled Itsuka Yuki no Hi ni (いつかゆきのひに) was released on February 5, 2014, with the staff and cast of the previous anime seasons returning. The BD/DVD consisted of two discs, the second containing a clip of the "Sound Theatre × Natsume Yuujinchou: Tsudoi Ongeki no Shou" musical event which was held on September 28, 2013.

Separate soundtrack albums for the two seasons were released in Japan by Sony Music on September 24, 2008, and March 18, 2009, respectively. The series opening and closing theme songs were also released by Sony Music. As singles, "Issei no Sei" reached a peak rank of 48th on the Oricon singles chart, "Natsu Yūzora" reached 27th, and "Ano Hi Time Machine" reached 38th. "Aishiteru" was not released as a single, but instead included on an album called Uta no Hibi by Kourin (also known as Callin').

A visual novel adaptation of the series, Natsume Yūjin-chō: Hazuki no Shirushi (夏目友人帳 ~葉月の記~), was announced in December 2024 by Bushiroad Games. It was released in Japan for Windows (via Steam) and Nintendo Switch on June 5, 2025.

== Reception ==
Since the fifth volume of the series, the individual volumes have made the best-seller list for manga in Japan. Volume 5 was ranked at number 8 on the charts for the week of March 4–10, 2008; Volume 6 was number 5 for the week of July 8–14, 2008; Volume 13 has done the best so far of the volumes, staying on the chart for three consecutive weeks (number 2 for the week of January 2–8, 2012, number 4 for the week of January 9–15, 2012, then falling to number 19 the following week). By February 2022, the manga has sold over 16 million copies. By September 2023, the manga had over 17 million copies in circulation.

Natsume's Book of Friends was one of twelve finalists for the first Manga Taishō award in 2008.

Both the anime and the manga have been noted for their optimistic themes and presentation.
