= Shuka (studio) =

Japanese animation studio

Shuka, Inc.
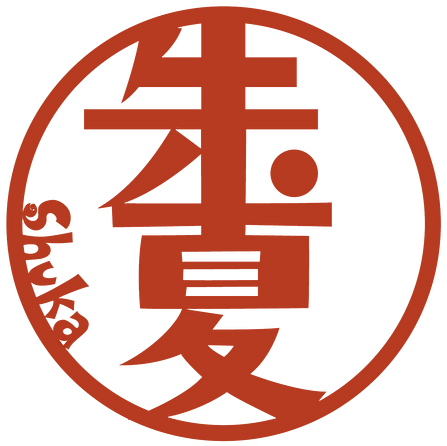
- Native name: 株式会社朱夏
- Romanized name: Kabushiki-gaisha Shuka
- Type: Kabushiki-gaisha
- Industry: Japanese animation
- Founded: June 2013; 13 years ago
- Founder: Yumi Satou
- Headquarters: Kamirenjaku, Mitaka, Tokyo, Japan
- Key people: Yumi Satou (CEO)
- Number of employees: 20 (as of January 2025)
- Website: www.shuka.co.jp

Shuka, Inc. (株式会社朱夏, Kabushiki-gaisha Shuka) is a Japanese animation studio founded in 2013 by former staff from Brain's Base.

== Works ==
=== Television series ===
| Title | Director(s) | First run start date | First run end date | Eps | Note(s) |
|---|---|---|---|---|---|
| Durarara!!x2 Shō | Takahiro Omori | January 10, 2015 | March 28, 2015 | 12 | Second season of Durarara!!, part one. |
| Durarara!!x2 Ten | Takahiro Omori | July 4, 2015 | September 26, 2015 | 12 | Second season of Durarara!!, part two. |
| Durarara!!x2 Ketsu | Takahiro Omori | January 9, 2016 | March 26, 2016 | 12 | Second season of Durarara!!, part three. |
| 91 Days | Hiro Kaburagi | July 8, 2016 | October 1, 2016 | 12 | Original work. |
| Natsume's Book of Friends: Fifth Season | Takahiro Omori (Chief); Kotomi Deai | October 4, 2016 | December 20, 2016 | 11 | Fifth season of Natsume's Book of Friends. |
| Natsume's Book of Friends: Sixth Season | Takahiro Omori (Chief); Kotomi Deai | April 11, 2017 | June 21, 2017 | 11 | Sixth season of Natsume's Book of Friends. |
| The Case Files of Jeweler Richard | Tarou Iwasaki | January 9, 2020 | March 26, 2020 | 12 | Based on a mystery light novel written by Nanako Tsujimura. |
| The Yuzuki Family's Four Sons | Mitsuru Hongo | October 5, 2023 | December 21, 2023 | 12 | Based on a manga written by Shizuki Fujisawa. |
| Natsume's Book of Friends: Seventh Season | Takahiro Omori (Chief); Hideki Ito | October 8, 2024 | December 24, 2024 | 12 | Seventh season of Natsume's Book of Friends. |
| Journal with Witch | Miyuki Oshiro | January 4, 2026 | March 29, 2026 | 13 | Based on a manga written by Tomoko Yamashita. |

=== Original video animations ===
| Title | Director(s) | Release date(s) | Ep(s) | Note(s) |
|---|---|---|---|---|
| Durarara!!x2 Shō: Watashi no Kokoro wa Nabe Moyou | Takahiro Omori | July 22, 2015 | 1 | Extra side story of Durarara!!x2 Shō. |
| Durarara!!x2 Ten: Onoroke Chakapoko | Takahiro Omori | January 27, 2016 | 1 | Extra side story of Durarara!!x2 Ten. |
| Durarara!!x2 Ketsu: Dufufufu!! | Takahiro Omori | July 27, 2016 | 1 | Extra side story of Durarara!!x2 Ketsu. |
| Natsume's Book of Friends: Fifth Season | Takahiro Omori (Chief); Kotomi Deai | March 22, 2017 – April 26, 2017 | 2 | Special episodes included with the Blu-ray releases of Natsume's Book of Friends: Fifth Season. |
| 91 Days | Hiro Kaburagi | July 5, 2017 | 1 | Episode thirteen of 91 Days included with the Blu-ray releases. |
| Natsume's Book of Friends: Sixth Season | Takahiro Omori (Chief); Kotomi Deai | September 27, 2017 – October 25, 2017 | 2 | Special episodes included with the Blu-ray releases of Natsume's Book of Friends: Sixth Season. |

=== Original net animations ===
| Title | Director(s) | Release date(s) | Ep(s) | Note(s) |
|---|---|---|---|---|
| Shabake | Hideki Ito | July 19, 2021 | 1 | Based on a novel written by Megumi Hatakenaka, celebrating the series' 20th anniversary. |

=== Films ===
| Title | Director(s) | Release date | Note(s) |
|---|---|---|---|
| Natsume's Book of Friends the Movie: Ephemeral Bond | Takahiro Omori (Chief); Hideki Ito | September 29, 2018 | Based on Natsume's Book of Friends by Yuki Midorikawa. |
| Natsume's Book of Friends: The Waking Rock and the Strange Visitor | Takahiro Omori (Chief); Hideki Ito | January 16, 2021 | Based on Natsume's Book of Friends by Yuki Midorikawa. |

== See also ==
- Takahiro Omori
