= Eien no 831 =

Japanese animated television film

- Key visual

永遠の831 (Eien no Hachisanichi)
- Genre: Adventure
- Anime television film
- Directed by: Kenji Kamiyama
- Written by: Kenji Kamiyama
- Music by: Go Shiina
- Studio: Craftar
- Licensed by: BI: Anime Limited
- Original network: Wowow
- Released: January 30, 2022 (TV); March 18, 2022 (theatrical)
- Runtime: 105 minutes

Eien no 831 (Japanese: 永遠の831, Hepburn: Eien no Hachisanichi) is a 2022 Japanese anime adventure television film written and directed by Kenji Kamiyama, with animation production by Craftar.

It premiered on television on Wowow on January 30, 2022. It was later released in theaters in Japan on March 18, 2022.

== Plot ==
In the present day, the world is in turmoil due to an "unprecedented disaster." A young man living in Tokyo, Suzushiro, has a secret he cannot tell anyone. That secret is that he can stop the time around him despite his thoughts. One day, he meets a girl named Nazuna who has the same "power". When he learns that she is being used in a crime, he impulsively reaches out to help her.

== Characters ==
Suzushirō Asano (浅野 スズシロウ, Asano Suzushirō)
Voiced by: Soma Saito (Japanese); Jason Kesser (English)
Nazuna Hashimoto (橋本 なずな, Hashimoto Nazuna)
Voiced by: M.A.O (Japanese); Isis Leyva (English)
Seri Agawa (亜川 芹, Agawa Seri)
Voiced by: Kazuyuki Okitsu (Japanese); Travis Roig (English)
Akina (アキナ)
Voiced by: Yoko Hikasa
Murotoa (室戸)
Voiced by: Akio Otsuka (Japanese); Paul Louis (English)
Sugoroku (双六)
Voiced by: Takatsugu Awazu (Japanese); Carlos Alayeto (English)
Older Sakata brother (坂田兄弟 (兄), Sakata kyōdai – Ani)
Voiced by: Takayuki Kondo (Japanese); Rayner Garranchan (English)
Younger Sakata brother (坂田兄弟 (弟), Sakata kyōdai – Oto)
Voiced by: Ryota Iwasaki (Japanese); Chris Flores (English)
Donki (ドンキ)
Voiced by: Seiichiro Yamashita (Japanese); Scott Genn (English)
Kyōko Kagami (各務 恭子, Kagami Kyōko)
Voiced by: Rei Igarashi (Japanese); Paula Barros (English)

== Production and release ==
The film was announced on August 3, 2021, to coincide with the 30th anniversary of Wowow. It is written for the screen and directed by Kenji Kamiyama and its animation production is by Craftar. Go Shiina composed the music. The film premiered on Wowow on January 30, 2022. Its main theme is "Hitohira no Mirai" performed by angela, while the opening theme is "Kingyo Bachi", performed by KanoeRana. After the television premiere, it was announced that the film would also be released in Japanese theaters on March 18, 2022. The film had a limited theatrical release in the UK on December 13, 2022, via Anime Limited.
