= Medaka Kuroiwa Is Impervious to My Charms =

Japanese manga series

- First tankōbon volume cover

黒岩メダカに私の可愛いが通じない (Kuroiwa Medaka ni Watashi no Kawaii ga Tsūjinai)
- Genre: Romantic comedy
- Manga
- Written by: Ran Kuze
- Published by: Kodansha
- English publisher: NA: Kodansha USA
- Imprint: Shōnen Magazine Comics
- Magazine: Weekly Shōnen Magazine
- Original run: May 26, 2021 – present
- Volumes: 26
- Anime television series
- Directed by: Yoshiaki Okumura
- Written by: Kazuyuki Fudeyasu (S1); Yoriko Tomita (S2)
- Music by: Akiyuki Tateyama
- Studio: SynergySP
- Licensed by: Crunchyroll
- Original network: TXN (TV Tokyo), AT-X
- Original run: January 7, 2025 – present
- Episodes: 12
- icon

Medaka Kuroiwa Is Impervious to My Charms (Japanese: 黒岩メダカに私の可愛いが通じない, Hepburn: Kuroiwa Medaka ni Watashi no Kawaii ga Tsūjinai) is a Japanese manga series written and illustrated by Ran Kuze. The series began serialization in Kodansha's Weekly Shōnen Magazine in May 2021, with its chapters collected in 26 tankōbon volumes as of October 2026. The series is licensed in English by Kodansha USA. An anime television series adaptation produced by SynergySP aired from January to March 2025. A second season is set to premiere in January 2027.

== Plot ==
Mona Kawai, a popular queen bee, is happy that everyone at her high school adores her, except for the new transfer student Medaka Kuroiwa, who looks angry all the time, and will not even look at her. Mona then makes it her mission to make him fall in love with her, but the more she tries, and the more Medaka resists, the more she finds herself falling in love with him. It turns out that Medaka is a monk-in-training who is forbidden by his temple masters from falling in love, but he finds it difficult to resist Mona's advances. Other girls join in either as Mona's rivals or supportive friends, much to Medaka's frustration, as he tries in vain to avoid more romantic advances.

== Characters ==
Medaka Kuroiwa (黒岩 メダカ, Kuroiwa Medaka)
Voiced by: Ryota Iwasaki (Japanese); Austin Tindle (English)
The titular protagonist of the series. Medaka is a second-year high school boy who is a monk-in-training at his family's temple. He is instructed not to fall in love with any girls, so he finds it rather frustrating that these city girls give him so much attention.^{Vol. 1} At the start of the series, he is the only one in school who does not show any romantic feelings for Mona at all. However, his frustrations only grow more as he realizes he is genuinely in love with her.
Mona Kawai (川井 モナ, Kawai Mona)
Voiced by: Yū Serizawa (Japanese); Megan Shipman (English)
The main heroine of the series. Mona is a beautiful and friendly second-year high school girl who is originally from Osaka Prefecture and had only moved to Tokyo the year prior. She prides herself on being the queen bee of the school, charming all the boys, until she meets Medaka. She then tries to win him over but ends up falling in love with him, although she denies the latter part. She occasionally reverts to her Kansai dialect when flustered. She is easily jealous of other girls who vie for Medaka's attention. Most of the story is told from her perspective.^{Vol. 1} Issue 2021 No. 29 of Weekly Shonen Magazine has pictures of Enako cosplaying Mona as well as characters in other series.
Tsubomi Haruno (春野 つぼみ, Haruno Tsubomi)
Voiced by: Kana Hanazawa (Japanese); Lindsay Sheppard (English)
Medaka and Mona's classmate greatly admires Mona, and has a collection of phone photos of her. Mona initially thinks of her as her love rival. After seeing Mona's interacting with Medaka, Tsubomi easily figures out that Mona likes him, and tries to push Mona towards the relationship.^{Vol. 1}
Asahi Shonan (湘南 旭, Shōnan Asahi)
Voiced by: Sora Amamiya (Japanese); Kelsey Cruz (English)
A first-year student and star basketball player, she falls head over heels in love with Medaka at first sight, and declares she is Mona's love rival.^{Ch. 16-18} Medaka does not reciprocate her feelings at all, and has constantly rejected her, finding her unappealing and very annoying. For this reason, Asahi grows to resent Mona with a passion.
Tomo Namba (難波 朋, Namba Tomo)
Voiced by: Hinaki Yano (Japanese); Katelyn Barr (English)
Mona's childhood friend from Osaka who transfers to her class. She is outwardly friendly and flirtatious.^{Vol. 4} She later feels conflicted for also developing a romantic interest in Medaka. She is from a single-parent household and moved to Tokyo to be with her father, who works as a writer. She was initially disapproving of Mona's crush on Medaka, but later develops feelings for him as well.
Minami Shirahama (白浜 美波, Shirahama Minami)
Voiced by: Kaori Maeda (Japanese); Kiane Chula King (English)
Asahi's classmate and best friend who supports her in her pursuit of Medaka. She has dark shoulder-length hair.^{Vol. 4}
Shou Kobayakawa (小早川 翔, Kobayakawa Shō)
Voiced by: Daiki Yamashita (Japanese); Corey Wilder (English)
Medaka's classmate and friend with the glasses.^{Ch. 56, 58}
Yuzuru Kido (木戸 譲, Kido Jō)
Voiced by: Tasuku Hatanaka (Japanese); Brandon Acosta (English)
Medaka's classmate and friend with light-colored short hair.
Anri Shinagawa (品川 杏莉, Shinagawa Anri)
A girl from an affluent household who takes an interest in Medaka. She has a rebellious streak stemming from her love of playing the guitar.

== Media ==
=== Manga ===
Written and illustrated by Ran Kuze, Medaka Kuroiwa Is Impervious to My Charms was originally published as a one-shot in Kodansha's shōnen manga magazine Weekly Shōnen Magazine on December 23, 2020, before beginning serialization in the same magazine on May 26, 2021. Kodansha has collected its chapters into individual tankōbon volumes. The first volume was released on August 17, 2021. As of October 16, 2026, twenty-six volumes have been released.

The series is licensed in English by Kodansha USA; the first English volume was released in digital on March 8, 2022. During their panel at Anime Expo 2022, Kodnasha USA announced that they would begin publishing the manga in print in Q2 2023.

==== Volumes ====
No.	Original release date	Original ISBN	English release date	English ISBN
1	August 17, 2021	978-4-06-524490-6	March 8, 2022 (digital); June 20, 2023 (print)	978-1-64-729232-4
1. That Jerk Won't Fall for Me; 2. P.E. with That Jerk; 3. Sketching with That Jerk; 4. That Fiendish Jerk; 5. In the Library with That Jerk; 6. Love and That Jerk; 7. That Girl's Wallpaper; 8. Cosplaying with That Jerk
Covers chapters in Weekly Shonen Magazine issues 2021 No. 26 to No. 32
2	November 17, 2021	978-4-06-525932-0	April 12, 2022 (digital); August 15, 2023 (print)	978-1-64-729306-2
9. Glued to That Jerk; 10. School Festival with That Jerk; 11. The Legend and That Jerk; 12. Cleaning with That Jerk; 13. Post-Festival Party with That Jerk; 14. Cooking with That Jerk; 15. That Jerk Gets Chewed Out; 16. That Jerk, Rain, and the Basketball Girl; 17. That Jerk and Asahi; 18. Private Lesson with That Jerk and Asahi
Covers chapters in Weekly Shonen Magazine issues 2021 No. 33 to No. 39, No. 41 to No. 44
3	January 17, 2022	978-4-06-526591-8	July 12, 2022 (digital); November 21, 2023 (print)	978-1-64-729307-9
19. Nursing That Jerk; 20. Nursing Battle Over That Jerk; 21. That Jerk and a K-; 22. That Jerk and a Bad Slump; 23. That Jerk's Home Screen Wallpaper; 24. A Pic for That Jerk; 25. Shopping with That Jerk; 26. Halloween with That Jerk; 27. Playing Games with That Jerk; 28. Taking Pics with That Jerk
Covers chapters in Weekly Shonen Magazine issues 2021 No. 45 to No. 47, No. 49 to 2022 No. 4/5
4	April 15, 2022	978-4-06-527540-5	October 11, 2022 (digital); December 26, 2023 (print)	978-1-64-729308-6
29. That Jerk and a Doofus; 30. That Jerk and a Blushing Girl; 31. That Jerk and Her Best Friend; 32. That Jerk and a Prank; 33. That Transfer Student and Being in Love; 34. That Jerk and a Kiss; 35. That Jerk and the Welcome Party; 36. At the Amusement Park with That Jerk; 37. On the Rollercoaster with That Jerk
Covers chapters in Weekly Shonen Magazine issues 2022 No. 6 to No. 13, and No. 15
5	July 15, 2022	978-4-06-528498-8	January 17, 2023 (digital); February 20, 2024 (print)	978-1-64-729335-2
38. That Jerk and Tomo; 39. That Jerk and Getting Separated; 40. All Alone with That Jerk; 41. Smitten with That Jerk; 42. That Jerk and an Admission; 43. That Jerk and the Magic of Love; 44. That Jerk and a Fever; 45. That Jerk and a Declaration; 46. Conquering That Jerk
Covers chapters in Weekly Shonen Magazine issues 2022 No. 16 to No. 25
6	September 16, 2022	978-4-06-529129-0	April 4, 2023 (digital); April 9, 2024 (print)	978-1-64-729338-3
47. A Date with That Jerk; 48. At the Arcade with That Jerk; 49. Matching with That Jerk; 50. That Jerk and the Phone Case; 51. A Secret with That Jerk; 52. That Girl Is on Cloud Nine; 53. That Jerk, Asahi, and a Secret Meeting; 54. Studying with That Jerk; 55. That Jerk and a Beauty Contest
Covers chapters in Weekly Shonen Magazine issues 2022 No. 26, and No. 28 to No. 35
7	November 17, 2022	978-4-06-529708-7	July 4, 2023 (digital); June 18, 2024 (print)	978-1-64-729344-4
56. Making a Sign with That Jerk; 57. That Jerk and Being Mature; 58. That Jerk and an Info Session; 59. That Jerk and the Night Before the Contest; 60. That Jerk and the Beauty Contest; 61. That Jerk and Self Intros; 62. That Jerk and a First; 63. That Jerk and a Kneeling; 64. That Jerk and a Swimsuit Fight
Covers chapters in Weekly Shonen Magazine issues 2022 No. 36/37 to No. 43, No. 45, and No. 46
8	January 17, 2023	978-4-06-530350-4	October 10, 2023 (digital); August 13, 2024 (print)	978-1-64-729375-8
65. That Jerk and the End of the Battle; 66. That Jerk and a Love Confession; 67. That Jerk and His Contemplation; 68. That Jerk and That Girl's True Feelings; 69. That Jerk and Changes; 70. Putting Up with That Jerk; 71. Batting with That Girl; 72. That Girl and Her Best Friend; 73. A Heart-to-Heart with That Girl
9	April 17, 2023	978-4-06-531236-0	December 12, 2023 (digital); November 12, 2024 (print)	978-1-64-729383-3
74. Girl Talk with That Girl; 75. That Jerk and a Three-Way War; 76. A New Everyday Routine with That Jerk; 77. Inviting That Jerk; 78. That Jerk and Flunking; 79. A Study Session with That Jerk; 80. A Break with That Jerk; 81. That Jerk and an Invitation; 82. That Jerk and the Kawai Family
Covers chapters in Weekly Shonen Magazine issues 2023 No. 6 to No. 10, and No. 12 to No. 15
10	July 14, 2023	978-4-06-531889-8	February 13, 2024 (digital); February 11, 2025 (print)	978-1-64-729401-4
83. That Jerk and a Detour; 84. That Jerk and Exams; 85. Shopping with That Jerk; 86. That Jerk and Basketball Shoes; 87. That Jerk and Basketball; 88. That Jerk and Christmas Schedule; 89. That Jerk and the One He's Going on a Date With; 90. Christmas with That Jerk; 91. Horror Movies with That Jerk
Covers chapters in Weekly Shonen Magazine issues 2023 No. 16 to No. 24, and No. 26
11	September 14, 2023	978-4-06-532892-7	April 9, 2024 (digital); May 13, 2025 (print)	978-1-64-729402-1
92. On the Couple Seat with That Jerk; 93. That Jerk and His Reason; 94. Christmas Party with That Jerk; 95. That Girl and the Precepts; 96. That Girl and the Popular Boy; 97. Texting That Jerk; 98. Sleepover with That Girl; 99. A Game with That Girl; 100. That Jerk and Girls
12	November 16, 2023	978-4-06-533554-3	June 11, 2024 (digital); July 15, 2025 (print)	978-1-64-729440-3
101. That Jerk and the Mysterious Girl; 102. That Jerk and the Girl with a Dream; 103. Running into That Girl; 104. That Jerk and the Precepts; 105. That Jerk and the Rule-Breaking Girl; 106. That Jerk and Warmth; 107. That Jerk and a Makeover; 108. That Girl and the Basketball Game; 109. Watching the Game with That Jerk
13	February 16, 2024	978-4-06-534572-6	August 13, 2024 (digital); October 14, 2025 (print)	978-1-64-729488-5
110. That Girl and Her Love Confession; 111. That Girl and Love; 112. That Jerk and Witnessing a Confession; 113. That Girl Goes on the Attack; 114. That Jerk and a Concert; 115. That Girl and Holding Hands; 116. That Girl and Willpower; 117. That Girl and Taking a Step Forward; 118. That Girl and a Declaration
14	May 16, 2024	978-4-06-535512-1	October 8, 2024 (digital); January 6, 2026 (print)	978-1-64-729489-2
119. An Alliance with That Girl; 120. Making Chocolate with That Girl; 121. Doing Research with That Girl; 122. An Indirect Kiss with That Jerk; 123. That Jerk and the Bottle; 124. That Jerk and Affection; 125. That Girl and an Unexpected Event; 126. That Jerk and Valentine's Day; 127. That Jerk and His First Chocolates
15	July 17, 2024	978-4-06-536157-3	January 21, 2025 (digital); April 14, 2026 (print)	978-1-64-729511-0
128. Dropping in on That Jerk; 129. That Jerk and a Cute Kohai; 130. That Girl and Advancing Feelings; 131. That Jerk's Chocolate Pie; 132. After-School Time with That Jerk; 133. That Jerk and Fessing up 134. That Jerk and His Present; 135. That Jerk and Their Own Pace; 136. That Jerk and That Night
16	October 17, 2024	978-4-06-537134-3	April 15, 2025 (digital); September 8, 2026 (print)	978-1-64-729644-5
137. That Jerk and the Blanket; 138. That Jerk and Worries; 139. That Jerk and Snow; 140. That Jerk and Congratulations; 141. That Jerk's Birthday; 142. That Jerk and Pulling a Fast One; 143. That Jerk and Thank-You Gifts; 144. That Jerk and P...; 145. That Girl and Her Little Brother
17	December 17, 2024	978-4-06-537774-1	July 15, 2025 (digital)	979-8-89-478585-1
146. That Jerk and a Coincidence; 147. That Girl and Fashion; 148. A New School Term with That Jerk; 149. That Jerk and the Queen Bee; 150. That Girl and Her Classmate; 151. That Jerk and the First-Year; 152. That Jerk and Class 3-B; 153. That Jerk and the Second-Year; 154. That Girl and Her Invitation
18	February 17, 2025	978-4-06-538420-6	October 21, 2025 (digital)	979-8-89-478729-9
155. That Girl and His Reply; 156. Barbecue with That Jerk; 157. Secret Talk with That Jerk; 158. That Jerk and Rock Paper Scissors; 159. Talking about Love with That Jerk; 160. That Girl and a Surprise; 161. That Jerk and What's on His Mind; 162. A School Event with That Jerk; 163. That Jerk and Younger Girls
19	May 16, 2025	978-4-06-539444-1	January 20, 2026 (digital)	979-8-89-478842-5
164. That Girl and Team Read; 165. In the P.E. Storage Room with That Girl; 166. Drama with That Jerk; 167. Sports Festival with That Jerk; 168. That Jerk and What She Dropped; 169. That Girl and the Average Boy; 170. Bread-Eating Race with That Jerk; 171. Reaching the Goal with That Jerk; 172. That Jerk and the Night After the Festival
20	August 12, 2025	978-4-06-540376-1	March 17, 2026 (digital)	979-8-89-830033-3
21	October 17, 2025	978-4-06-541108-7	May 19, 2026 (digital)	979-8-89-830107-1
22	January 16, 2026	978-4-06-542211-3	July 21, 2026 (digital)	979-8-89-830174-3
23	March 17, 2026	978-4-06-542960-0	September 22, 2026 (digital)	979-8-89-830285-6
24	May 15, 2026	978-4-06-543628-8	October 20, 2026 (digital)	979-8-89-830293-1
25	August 17, 2026	978-4-06-544629-4	—	—
26	October 16, 2026	978-4-06-545279-0	—	—

=== Anime ===
An anime television series adaptation was announced on May 13, 2024. It is produced by SynergySP and directed by Yoshiaki Okumura, with scripts written by Kazuyuki Fudeyasu, characters designed by Mayumi Watanabe, and music composed by Akiyuki Tateyama. The series aired from January 7 to March 25, 2025, on TV Tokyo and its affiliates. (Note: TV Tokyo lists the series premiere on January 6, 2025, at 24:00, which is effectively January 7 at midnight JST.) The opening theme song is "Ame Tokimeki Koi Moyō" (雨トキメキ恋模様; lit. 'Heart-Fluttering Rainy Love Pattern') performed by AyaFubuMi (a VTuber sub-unit composed of Hololive talents Nakiri Ayame, Shirakami Fubuki, and Ookami Mio), while the first ending theme song is "Kyunapi" (キュンアピ), performed by Kaori Maeda, and the second ending theme song is "Is this love?", performed by Rikako Aida. Crunchyroll streamed the series.

Following the airing of the final episode, a second season was announced. The staff and cast from the first season are reprising their roles, with Yoriko Tomita replacing Fudeyasu as series scriptwriter. It is set to premiere in January 2027.

==== Episodes ====
No.	Title	Directed by (Note: Production staff information is taken from the ending credits of each episode.)	Written by	Storyboarded by	Original release date
1	"Can't Charm Him"; Transliteration: "Ochinai Aitsu" (Japanese: オチないアイツ)	Yoshiaki Okumura	Kazuyuki Fudeyasu	Yoshiaki Okumura	January 7, 2025
Since birth Mona has been exceptionally beautiful and charming. Moving from Osaka to Tokyo for high school she establishes herself as Queen Bee, making friends of the girls whilst all the boys love her. The only exception is newly transferred classmate Medaka, who seems to actively dislike her. Unused to such treatment she devotes her time trying to get his attention, even flashing her underwear at him, but this just makes him angry. When she trips Medaka catches her and she is shocked to realise she might actually be falling in love with him instead. Infuriated by this she becomes determined to charm him but accidentally soaks herself in water. Medaka gives her his shirt to cover her exposed bra while Mona is entranced by his shirtless chest. The other boys confront him for being mean to Mona, causing Medaka to admit he is actually a monk in training forbidden from love. Far from disliking Mona he actually has a crush on her, and his angry glares are actually him resisting lustful thoughts. Unaware of this Mona remains determined to charm him whilst the boys, who now know the truth, find the situation unbearably funny.
2	"In Love with Him"; Transliteration: "Aitsu to "Suki"" (Japanese: アイツと“好き”)	Yoshiaki Okumura	Kazuyuki Fudeyasu	Haruka Watanabe	January 14, 2025
During art class Mona and Medaka are assigned to sketch each other. Mona notices their classmate Tsubomi keeps sneaking glances at her. Mona poses for the sketch, hoping to entice Medaka, only to be aroused by Medaka staring at her with such intensity. Later, she keeps noticing Tsubomi nearby. Fearing Tsubomi might be a love rival she assumes Medaka likes smart girls like Tsubomi, so she dons glasses whilst also deliberately brushing her leg against Medaka under the table. She is shocked when Medaka glares at her before leaving. Mona starts following Tsubomi, trying to determine what makes her special, but only finds Tsubomi is a normal girl. Changing tactics she decides to flirt with Medaka directly, but finds she cannot even say the word "love" around him. During selection for festival committee Tsubomi and Mona are chosen as representatives. Mona cannot understand why Tsubomi seems happy to be working alongside a rival. Mona sees Tsubomi's phone and realises she has hundreds of pictures of her, meaning Tsubomi was never interested in Medaka, it was Mona. Mona is horrified when Tsubomi reveals she has been watching Mona so closely she figured out she has a crush on Medaka, but not to worry, Tsubomi will help get her and Medaka together.
3	"School Festival With Him"; Transliteration: "Aitsu to Bunka-sai" (Japanese: アイツと文化祭)	Matsui Hitoyuki	Kazuyuki Fudeyasu	Yoshiaki Okumura	January 21, 2025
Tsubomi tells Mona about their schools Bridge of Love; anyone who crosses the glass bridge during the festival will fall in love. Mona considers seducing Medaka with an outfit but Medaka walks in while she is a sexy bunny girl. Embarrassed but desperate to avoid Tsubomi misunderstanding Mona pulls Medaka into a closet to hide. With their bodies pressed together Mona becomes aroused. Tsubomi leaves and Mona is disappointed he avoided becoming aroused with prayer. Medaka admits she looks cute. Mona is sure he has finally fallen for her, only the next morning his angry glares are worse than before. During the festival Mona and Medaka work in the Bunny Café but he refuses to spend time with her until Tsubomi orders him to go advertise the café with Mona. Mona takes the opportunity to make him visit the festival with her, but everything goes wrong. In the haunted house she gets her skirt stuck and flashes her underwear. At the crepe stall a crow steals her crepe. At the music concert she loses Medaka in the dark and flirts with the wrong guy. Mona has no idea what to do next but suddenly realises she and Medaka are stood at the entrance to the Bridge of Love.
4	"Legend with Him"; Transliteration: "Aitsu to Densetsu" (Japanese: アイツと伝説)	Koichiro Kuroda	Kazuyuki Fudeyasu	Hitoyuki Matsui	January 28, 2025
To fulfill the legend of the bridge Mona needs to hold Medaka’s hand, so she fakes a fall hoping he will grab her hand. However, Medaka picks her up under her arms, embarrassing her. Tsubomi helps by asking Mona and Medaka to clear the cafe furniture together. Mona accidentally knocks over boxes on the bridge so Medaka grabs her hand to pull her away. Medaka quickly claims this does not count as the festival already ended but Mona considers it her victory. Unfortunately, Medaka seems unaffected the next day whilst she cannot look at him without blushing. Secretly, Medaka only keeps his composure through prayer. Their whole class goes bowling so Mona forces herself to sit next to him and steals his drink, hoping an indirect kiss will charm him. She is frustrated when Medaka resists, but only just. The boys Shou and Yuzuru, and Tsubomi, all tell Medaka that avoiding love is no excuse to hurt Mona’s feelings and he needs to be nicer to her. Realising they are right Medaka offers to share his textbook when Mona forgets her own. Mona is so happy Tsubomi gets a photo of her smiling that is her favourite one yet.
5	"Basketball Girl with Him"; Transliteration: "Aitsu to Basuke-Joshi" (Japanese: アイツとバスケ女子)	Shūji Saitō	Mio Inoue	Yoshinori Odaka	February 4, 2025
Despite making progress Mona notices Medaka will still glare at her for certain things; e.g. sharing an umbrella in the rain is fine but holding hands is forbidden. She thus makes it her mission to discover all the things she can and can't do. Mona is confronted by first year basketball star Asahi who demands to know if she is dating Medaka, which Mona denies. Mona suspects Asahi must have a crush on Medaka. Mona learns Asahi is a minor celebrity in basketball and is popular despite being rather bossy, and yet around Medaka she panics, blushes and collapses, accidentally flashing her underwear. Mona confirms Asahi is in full blown love with Medaka, making her a serious rival. Mona attempts to impress Medaka with her own basketball skills. As Medaka is a poor player she tries to teach him how to throw the ball, making sure to emphasise her body as she does so. Asahi interrupts and accuses her of liking Medaka after all. She then insists on showing Medaka how to do a Plank for muscle strengthening, unaware this lets Medaka see down her shirt. Mona responds by Planking too, over stimulating Medaka who flees in embarrassment. Both girls are furious at each other and embarrassed that they definitely went too far.
6	"Nursing With Him"; Transliteration: "Aitsu o Kanbyō" (Japanese: アイツを看病)	Yuki Morita	Mio Inoue	Hitoyuki Matsui	February 11, 2025
Having fled home in the rain Medaka catches a cold and misses school. Since Medaka lives alone both Mona and Asahi separately decide to visit him, only to encounter each other on the way. Medaka panics to find both girls in his apartment competing to take care of him and competing to get his attention with sexy cosplay; Mona as a nurse and Asahi as a doctor. Amidst the chaos Medaka manages to fall asleep, giving the girls a chance to talk. Asahi admits she wants a normal relationship with Medaka, but becomes embarrassed and leaves to buy drinks. Medaka unexpectedly hugs Mona in his sleep. Mona is tempted to kiss him but quickly stops herself just as Asahi returns. Confused, Mona blurts out the truth, that she only wants Medaka to fall for her because he is the only one who shows no interest in her. Asahi realises Mona is in love with Medaka but is in denial about it. At school Mona is confused that Asahi now openly talks to her as if they were friends. Tsubomi stresses about what this means for their rivalry. Medaka returns to school but Mona blushes every time she sees him. When she faints Medaka takes her to the nurse as it turns out she caught his fever. Mona desperately convinces herself blushing was just caused by the fever.
7	"Lockscreen With Him"; Transliteration: "Aitsu to Machiuke" (Japanese: アイツと待ち受け)	Mayu Numayama	Megumu Sasano	Mayu Numayama	February 18, 2025
Shou pranks Medaka by changing his phone’s screensaver to a bikini girl. Meanwhile, Tsubomi sends Medaka a picture of Mona staring longingly at him. Mona is horrified Medaka might get the wrong idea and rushes to grab his phone, accidentally seeing the bikini picture. Medaka fears she thinks he is a pervert when really Mona is upset that he does look lustfully at girls, but not at her. She sends him a selfie hoping he will secretly keep it, but he deletes it. Refusing to give up she plans a Halloween party for the class, planning to give Medaka a picture of herself in costume. Everyone goes costume shopping, including Asahi. Mona doesn’t worry about Asahi finding a good costume due to her terrible fashion sense and ignores her to search for her own costume. Meanwhile, Asahi receives help from her best friend Minami, who is much more stylish. Mona spies on Medaka and picks a costume that seemed to draw his attention the most. Tsubomi ends up as a fairy, Asahi as a goth and Mona as a mummy, using as few bandages as possible. Unfortunately, Medaka is too embarrassed to look at her as it turns out he had liked another costume next to the mummy one. Mona quickly chooses another costume, determined to make him look at her at the party.
8	"Halloween With Him"; Transliteration: "Aitsu to Harouin" (Japanese: アイツとハロウィン)	Shūji Saitō	Megumu Sasano	Shūji Saitō	February 25, 2025
Mona attends the party in the actual costume Medaka liked, a witch. Tsubomi switches from a fairy to a ghost. Mona's dress comes unzipped so she asks Tsubomi to fix it, unaware it is Medaka in an identical ghost costume. Panicking, Medaka tries to fix the zip quickly, only for Mona to angrily discover him anyway. To get her photo on Medaka's phone Mona decides to win a party game so they can take a victory photo. Medaka must use toilet paper to mummify Mona, but while trying not to touch her body he does a terrible job. Mona wraps herself as tightly as possible, over-stimulating Medaka so much he quits the game. Mona becomes upset during the group photo at the end of the night. The next day the boys point out Mona is clearly upset at him and send him to apologise. Unfortunately Medaka panics and flees. Mona assumes this is her fault and tries to give a bizarre apology by flashing her panties at him while cleaning, only to accidentally soak him with a mop bucket. By coincidence they both apologise at the same time with Medaka explaining he doesn't like photos at all, so it wasn't personal. Later, Tsubomi sends Medaka a photo of Mona smiling which he temporarily uses as a screensaver, only to guiltily change it back. Meanwhile, a new girl arrives in Tokyo.
9	"Best Friend With Him"; Transliteration: "Aitsu to Shin'yū" (Japanese: アイツと親友)	Moe Sasaki	Michiru Tenma	Satoru Yamashita	March 4, 2025 (Note: This episode aired at 12:30 a.m. JST, 30 minutes after the original air time on TV Tokyo.)
Asahi's friend Minami suggests she surprise Medaka with a kiss, so Minami invites him to sit with Asahi at lunch. Mona is happy her childhood friend Tomo is visiting from their hometown in Osaka. Medaka is baffled when Asahi blindfolds him and kisses him on the cheek, though he doesn't realise that's what it was. Mona meets Tomo, an incorrigible flirt, who is surprised Mona doesn't have a boyfriend but she does deduce there is a boy Mona likes. Medaka coincidentally appears at that moment so Tomo immediately flirts with him, only to see on Mona's face that Medaka is the boy she likes. The next day Tomo appears in Medaka and Mona's class, having transferred from Osaka to Tokyo with her father, an author. Mona feels nervous as Tomo is known for causing trouble amongst the boys, as proven when she brazenly gropes Mona's breasts in front of Medaka, Shou and Yuzuru. Mona claims her only interest in Medaka is that he shows no interest in her. Tomo insists Mona has a real crush on Medaka. Mona protests, so Tomo instead lists all the reasons Mona shouldn't have a crush on him; average looks, unfriendly and cowardly around girls. Mona defends Medaka, which only convinces Tomo more, so she decides she will spend all her time in Tokyo making Mona realise she is in love with Medaka.
10	"Theme Park With Him"; Transliteration: "Aitsu to Yūenchi" (Japanese: アイツと遊園地)	Yuki Morita	Michiru Tenma	Hitoyuki Matsui	March 11, 2025 (Note: This episode aired at 12:10 a.m. JST, 10 minutes after the original air time on TV Tokyo.)
Asahi admits to Mona she gave Medaka a kiss. Tomo is unconcerned as there is a big difference between giving a kiss and kissing. Mona is upset anyway. Seeing Mona needs help Tomo asks for a get-together with everyone in class. That night Mona also realises the difference between giving a kiss and kissing and is relieved Medaka and Asahi aren't dating. Still uneasy, Mona doesn't get any sleep and attends the get-together unfocused. Tomo announces their get-together will be at a theme park. Mona fails to prevent Asahi sitting next to Medaka on the roller coaster to hold his hand. With Tomo's meddling Medaka agrees to go on the ride again with Mona. Mona asks Medaka if he has fallen for Asahi. Believing she is casually gossiping Medaka denies this then surprises Mona by asking if there is a boy she likes. This causes Mona to go completely silent, making Tomo and Asahi suspicious of what happened. Medaka believes he upset her by not gossiping properly. Later, Tomo sends him to buy snacks with Mona. Mona impulsively claims they are dating in order to get limited edition sweets for couples. Medaka panics when the vendor asks to see a kiss as proof, but Mona forces herself to be brave, grabs hold of him and starts moving her mouth towards his.
11	"Alone With Him"; Transliteration: "Aitsu to Futa-ri kiri" (Japanese: アイツと二人きり)	Mayu Numayama	Kazuyuki Fudeyasu	Mayu Numayama	March 18, 2025
Mona panics at the last second. Medaka is disappointed then remembers he is supposed to be a monk-in-training. Tomo scolds Mona for hiding her real self from everyone except Medaka. Mona realises she must have been dropping her guard around Medaka a lot for Tomo to notice. Overthinking, she becomes lost, breaks her phone and is approached by two creeps. Medaka finds her first and intimidates the creeps into leaving. Medaka tries to call the others, but his phone becomes broken as well. Mona notices Medaka wants to ride the ferris wheel and suggests they use it to spot their friends. After almost falling on him during the ride Mona notices her embarrassed face reflected in the glass and realises this is what Tomo meant about only showing her real self to Medaka. She also realises she has been doing it for a long time. Medaka claims she keeps acting strangely, looking at him either angrily, or sulking and yet the very next second she is smiling again. Mona realises Medaka has been seeing her real self the whole time, so there is no possibility of him liking her. However, Medaka explains her constantly changing expressions confuse him, and yet it somehow makes her even cuter. Hearing this Mona is so completely overwhelmed she can't deny it anymore and admits to herself she has fallen in love with Medaka.
12	"First Love With Him"; Transliteration: "Aitsu ni Hatsukoi" (Japanese: アイツに初恋)	Yoshiaki Okumura, Yutaro Yamamoto	Kazuyuki Fudeyasu	Yoshiaki Okumura	March 25, 2025
Returning to their friends Mona cannot think straight whilst Medaka thinks Mona is the cutest she's ever been. Mona feigns illness so she can go home and confesses everything to Tomo, who is glad for her. Feeling guilty, Mona also tells Asahi. Asahi is frustrated at herself for allowing Mona and Medaka time to be alone together. Mona is surprised when Asahi warns her she'd better start fighting even harder for Medaka just like she will. The next morning Mona is sick with fever. Mona realises she doesn't know what to do, having always been loved by others but never in love herself. With her phone broken she calls Tomo on her brothers Ipad and admits to feeling lonely stuck at home, so Tomo mischievously passes the phone to Medaka. After some embarrassment they chat normally and Mona enjoys it so much she wonders if they could do it more often if they were dating. Mona's mother interrupts, causing Mona to drop the Ipad, flashing Medaka her panties. She panics so much she smashes her brothers Ipad. Medaka only calms down by chanting mantras and dousing himself in cold water. Mona returns to school determined to make Medaka her boyfriend. This determination lasts right up to accidentally touching Medaka's hand in class, causing such embarrassment she flees all the way home, shouting that one day Medaka will be her boyfriend.

== Reception ==
In January 2022, Kodansha reported that the series had over 150,000 copies in circulation. In August 2023, it was announced to have reached 1 million copies in circulation. In September 2026, it was announced that it had surpassed 3 million copies.

== Works cited ==
- "Ch." and "Vol." is shortened form for chapter and volume of the Medaka Kuroiwa Is Impervious to My Charms manga.
