= Say You to Yo Asobi =

Japanese internet variety show

- 声優と夜あそび
- Genre: Variety
- Directed by: Hideki Kasai
- Presented by: Hiroki Yasumoto (Mon); Tomoaki Maeno (Mon); Hiro Shimono (Tue); Maaya Uchida (Tue); Mikako Komatsu (Wed); Sumire Uesaka (Wed); Aimi (Wed); Daisuke Namikawa (Thu); Kaito Ishikawa (Thu); Tomokazu Seki (Fri); Tasuku Hatanaka (Fri); Subaru Kimura (Connect); Tomoko Kaneda (Connect); Showtaro Morikubo (Weekend); Shugo Nakamura (Weekend)
- Country of origin: Japan
- No. of seasons: 8

Production
- Running time: 120 minutes

Original release
- Network: AbemaTV
- Release: April 2, 2018 – present

Say You to Yo Asobi (声優と夜あそび, Seiyū to Yo Asobi; lit. "A Night Out with Voice Actors") is a Japanese Internet variety show broadcasting weeknights on AbemaTV's Anime Live Channel. The show features voice actors, who have appeared in various anime and video game series, participating in acting scenarios, quizzes, and talk segments. The show has been running since April 2018 and celebrated its 1,000th episode run in 2021.

As of 2021, the show is currently hosted by Hiroki Yasumoto and Tomoaki Maeno on Mondays; Hiro Shimono and Maaya Uchida on Tuesdays; Mikako Komatsu, Sumire Uesaka, and Aimi on Wednesdays; Daisuke Namikawa and Kaito Ishikawa on Thursdays; Tomokazu Seki and Tasuku Hatanaka on Fridays; and Showtaro Morikubo and Shugo Nakamura on the first weekend of every month. In addition, Subaru Kimura and Tomoko Kaneda host the mini program Say You to Yo Asobi: Connect every weeknight.

== Recurring segments ==
=== Current ===
- "Dummy Head Healing" (ダミへヒーリング, Dami He Hīringu): In Hiro Shimono and Maaya Uchida's segments, they would read and act lines from a specific scenario to a dummy head microphone.

=== Former ===
- "Viewer Submission! 10-Second Dubbing" (視聴者投稿！ 10秒アフレコ, Shichōsha Tōkō! Jū-byō Afureko): In Hiroki Yasumoto and Takuya Eguchi's segments, one of them would dub a 10-second video clip submitted by their viewers.

== Production ==
Say You to Yo Asobi was first broadcast on April 2, 2018. The hosts were Megumi Ogata and Aya Uchida on Mondays; Yūki Ono and Yuka Ōtsubo on Tuesdays; Hiromi Igarashi and Shiori Mikami on Wednesdays; Daisuke Namikawa and Kishō Taniyama on Thursdays; and Tomokazu Seki and Takuya Satō on Fridays.

Say You to Yo Asobi was renewed for a second season, which began broadcast on April 8, 2019. The hosts were Hiroki Yasumoto and Takuya Eguchi on Mondays; Tomoko Kaneda and Subaru Kimura on Tuesdays; Hiro Shimono and Maaya Uchida on Wednesdays; Daisuke Namikawa on Thursdays; and Tomokazu Seki and Genki Okawa on Fridays. Namikawa, who hosted the show on Thursday evenings, had no fixed co-host until Takuya Satō returned to the show in September 2019. Prior to that, Namikawa's co-host rotated monthly, with Showtaro Morikubo co-hosting in April, Tsubasa Yonaga in May, Hiroyuki Yoshino in June, and Kaito Ishikawa in August.

Say You to Yo Asobi began its third season in April 2020. The hosts were Hiroki Yasumoto and Shugo Nakamura on Mondays; Hiro Shimono and Maaya Uchida on Tuesdays; Mikako Komatsu and Sumire Uesaka on Wednesdays; Daisuke Namikawa and Kaito Ishikawa on Thursdays; and Tomokazu Seki and Showtaro Morikubo on Fridays. In addition to its hosts, the main segments were shortened to 105 minutes to make room for a new 15-minute mini program titled Say You to Yo Asobi: Connect, hosted by Subaru Kimura and Tomoko Kaneda, that was broadcast every weeknight.

Say You to Yo Asobi began its fourth season on April 12, 2021. All hosts returned to reprise their segments, with the exception of Morikubo and Nakamura, who were moved to a "weekend" broadcast day that would be featured on the first weekend of every month. Tomoaki Maeno appeared as Yasumoto's new co-host on Mondays; Tasuku Hatanaka appeared as Seki's new co-host on Fridays; Sora Tokui co-hosted Wednesdays with Komatsu and Uesaka until July 2021, where she was later replaced by Aimi. A special episode hosted by the weekend hosts was broadcast on April 3, 2021. In June 2021, a collaboration project with the Japan Racing Association was broadcast, with a special video featuring the hosts making predictions about Takarazuka Kinen. Shimono was temporarily replaced by Yōko Hikasa and Hatanaka after testing positive for COVID-19 in July 2021.

== Episodes ==
No. overall	No. in season	Title	Guests	Original release date
TBA	1	"Mon: Hiroki Yasumoto × Tomoaki Maeno #1" (Japanese: 月【安元洋貴×前野智昭】 #1)	N/A	April 12, 2021
TBA	2	"Tues: Hiro Shimono × Maaya Uchida #1" (Japanese: 火【下野紘×内田真礼】#1)	N/A	April 13, 2021
TBA	3	"Wed: Mikako Komatsu × Sumire Uesaka × Sora Tokui #1" (Japanese: 水【小松未可子×上坂すみれ×徳井青空】 #1)	N/A	April 14, 2021
TBA	4	"Thu: Daisuke Namikawa × Kaito Ishikawa #1" (Japanese: 木【浪川大輔×石川界人】#1)	N/A	April 15, 2021
TBA	5	"Fri: Tomokazu Seki × Tasuku Hatanaka #1" (Japanese: 金【関智一×畠中祐】#1)	N/A	April 16, 2021
TBA	6	"Weekend: Showtaro Morikubo × Shugo Nakamura #1" (Japanese: WEEKEND【森久保祥太郎×仲村宗悟】 #1)	Mitsuo Iwata, Hiroki Yasumoto, Tasuku Hatanaka	April 17, 2021
TBA	7	"Mon: Hiroki Yasumoto × Tomoaki Maeno #2" (Japanese: 月【安元洋貴×前野智昭】 #2)	N/A	April 19, 2021
TBA	8	"Tues: Hiro Shimono × Maaya Uchida #2" (Japanese: 火【下野紘×内田真礼】#2)	N/A	April 20, 2021
TBA	9	"Wed: Mikako Komatsu × Sumire Uesaka × Sora Tokui #2" (Japanese: 水【小松未可子×上坂すみれ×徳井青空】 #2)	N/A	April 21, 2021
TBA	10	"Thu: Daisuke Namikawa × Kaito Ishikawa #2" (Japanese: 木【浪川大輔×石川界人】#1)	N/A	April 22, 2021
TBA	11	"Fri: Tomokazu Seki × Tasuku Hatanaka #2" (Japanese: 金【関智一×畠中祐】#2)	N/A	April 23, 2021
TBA	12	"Mon: Hiroki Yasumoto × Tomoaki Maeno #3" (Japanese: 月【安元洋貴×前野智昭】 #3)	N/A	April 26, 2021
TBA	13	"Tues: Hiro Shimono × Maaya Uchida #3" (Japanese: 火【下野紘×内田真礼】#3)	N/A	April 27, 2021
TBA	14	"Wed: Mikako Komatsu × Sumire Uesaka × Sora Tokui #3" (Japanese: 水【小松未可子×上坂すみれ×徳井青空】 #3)	Kaori Ishihara, Reina Kondō	April 28, 2021
TBA	15	"Thu: Daisuke Namikawa × Kaito Ishikawa #3" (Japanese: 木【浪川大輔×石川界人】#3)	N/A	April 29, 2021
TBA	16	"Fri: Tomokazu Seki × Tasuku Hatanaka #3" (Japanese: 金【関智一×畠中祐】#3)	Hello Kitty	April 30, 2021
TBA	17	"Mon: Hiroki Yasumoto × Tomoaki Maeno #4" (Japanese: 月【安元洋貴×前野智昭】 #4)	Kohsuke Toriumi	May 3, 2021
TBA	18	"Tues: Hiro Shimono × Maaya Uchida #4" (Japanese: 火【下野紘×内田真礼】#4)	Maria Naganawa	May 4, 2021
TBA	19	"Wed: Mikako Komatsu × Sumire Uesaka × Sora Tokui #4" (Japanese: 水【小松未可子×上坂すみれ×徳井青空】 #4)	Yōko Hikasa	May 5, 2021
TBA	20	"Thu: Daisuke Namikawa × Kaito Ishikawa #4" (Japanese: 木【浪川大輔×石川界人】#4)	Yūto Uemura	May 6, 2021
TBA	21	"Fri: Tomokazu Seki × Tasuku Hatanaka #4" (Japanese: 金【関智一×畠中祐】#4)	Kenji Nojima	May 7, 2021
TBA	22	"Mon: Hiroki Yasumoto × Tomoaki Maeno #5" (Japanese: 月【安元洋貴×前野智昭】#5)	N/A	May 10, 2021
TBA	23	"Tue: Hiro Shimono × Maaya Uchida #5" (Japanese: 火【下野紘×内田真礼】#5)	N/A	May 11, 2021
TBA	24	"Wed: Mikako Komatsu × Sumire Uesaka × Sora Tokui #5" (Japanese: 水【小松未可子×上坂すみれ×徳井青空】 #5)	Yōko Hikasa	May 12, 2021
TBA	25	"Thu: Daisuke Namikawa × Kaito Ishikawa #5" (Japanese: 木【浪川大輔×石川界人】#5)	Nobuhiko Okamoto	May 13, 2021
TBA	26	"Fri: Tomokazu Seki × Tasuku Hatanaka #5" (Japanese: 金【関智一×畠中祐】#5)	N/A	May 14, 2021
TBA	27	"Mon: Hiroki Yasumoto × Tomoaki Maeno #6" (Japanese: 月【安元洋貴×前野智昭】#6)	N/A	May 24, 2021
TBA	28	"Tue: Hiro Shimono × Maaya Uchida #6" (Japanese: 火【下野紘×内田真礼】#6)	2nd Street	May 25, 2021
TBA	29	"Wed: Mikako Komatsu × Sumire Uesaka × Sora Tokui #6" (Japanese: 水【小松未可子×上坂すみれ×徳井青空】 #6)	N/A	May 26, 2021
TBA	30	"Thu: Daisuke Namikawa × Kaito Ishikawa #6" (Japanese: 木【浪川大輔×石川界人】#6)	Shun Horie	May 27, 2021
TBA	31	"Fri: Tomokazu Seki × Tasuku Hatanaka #6" (Japanese: 金【関智一×畠中祐】#6)	N/A	May 28, 2021
TBA	32	"Weekend: Showtaro Morikubo × Shugo Nakamura #2" (Japanese: WEEKEND【森久保祥太郎×仲村宗悟】#2)	N/A	May 30, 2021
TBA	33	"Mon: Hiroki Yasumoto × Tomoaki Maeno #7" (Japanese: 月【安元洋貴×前野智昭】#7)	N/A	May 31, 2021
TBA	34	"Tue: Hiro Shimono × Maaya Uchida #7" (Japanese: 火【下野紘×内田真礼】#7)	Hiroki Yasumoto	June 1, 2021
TBA	35	"Wed: Mikako Komatsu × Sumire Uesaka × Sora Tokui #7" (Japanese: 水【小松未可子×上坂すみれ×徳井青空】 #7)	Hiroki Yasumoto	June 2, 2021
TBA	36	"Thu: Daisuke Namikawa × Kaito Ishikawa #7" (Japanese: 木【浪川大輔×石川界人】#7)	Hiroki Yasumoto	June 3, 2021
TBA	37	"Fri: Tomokazu Seki × Tasuku Hatanaka #7" (Japanese: 金【関智一×畠中祐】#7)	Hiroki Yasumoto	June 4, 2021
TBA	38	"Weekend: Showtaro Morikubo × Shugo Nakamura #3" (Japanese: WEEKEND【森久保祥太郎×仲村宗悟】 #3)	N/A	June 5, 2021
TBA	39	"Mon: Hiroki Yasumoto × Tomoaki Maeno #8" (Japanese: 月【安元洋貴×前野智昭】#8)	Nobunaga Shimazaki	June 7, 2021
TBA	40	"Tue: Hiro Shimono × Maaya Uchida #8" (Japanese: 火【下野紘×内田真礼】#8)	N/A	June 8, 2021
TBA	41	"Wed: Mikako Komatsu × Sumire Uesaka × Sora Tokui #8" (Japanese: 水【小松未可子×上坂すみれ×徳井青空】 #8)	N/A	June 9, 2021
TBA	42	"Thu: Daisuke Namikawa × Kaito Ishikawa #8" (Japanese: 木【浪川大輔×石川界人】#8)	N/A	June 10, 2021
TBA	43	"Fri: Tomokazu Seki × Tasuku Hatanaka #8" (Japanese: 金【関智一×畠中祐】#8)	N/A	June 11, 2021
TBA	44	"Tue: Hiro Shimono × Maaya Uchida #9" (Japanese: 火【下野紘×内田真礼】#9)	N/A	June 15, 2021
TBA	45	"Wed: Mikako Komatsu × Sumire Uesaka × Sora Tokui #9" (Japanese: 水【小松未可子×上坂すみれ×徳井青空】 #9)	N/A	June 16, 2021
TBA	46	"Thu: Daisuke Namikawa × Kaito Ishikawa #9" (Japanese: 木【浪川大輔×石川界人】#9)	Kazuyuki Okitsu	June 17, 2021
TBA	47	"Fri: Tomokazu Seki × Tasuku Hatanaka #9" (Japanese: 金【関智一×畠中祐】#9)	N/A	June 18, 2021
TBA	48	"Mon: Hiroki Yasumoto × Tomoaki Maeno #10" (Japanese: 月【安元洋貴×前野智昭】#10)	N/A	June 21, 2021
TBA	49	"Tue: Hiro Shimono × Maaya Uchida #10" (Japanese: 火【下野紘×内田真礼】#10)	N/A	June 22, 2021
TBA	50	"Wed: Mikako Komatsu × Sumire Uesaka × Sora Tokui #10" (Japanese: 水【小松未可子×上坂すみれ×徳井青空】 #10)	N/A	June 23, 2021
TBA	51	"Thu: Daisuke Namikawa × Kaito Ishikawa #10" (Japanese: 木【浪川大輔×石川界人】#10)	N/A	June 24, 2021
TBA	52	"Fri: Tomokazu Seki × Tasuku Hatanaka #10" (Japanese: 金【関智一×畠中祐】#10)	N/A	June 25, 2021
TBA	53	"Mon: Hiroki Yasumoto × Tomoaki Maeno #11" (Japanese: 月【安元洋貴×前野智昭】#11)	N/A	June 27, 2021
TBA	54	"Tue: Hiro Shimono × Maaya Uchida #11" (Japanese: 火【下野紘×内田真礼】#11)	N/A	June 29, 2021
TBA	55	"Wed: Mikako Komatsu × Sumire Uesaka × Sora Tokui #11" (Japanese: 水【小松未可子×上坂すみれ×徳井青空】 #11)	Aimi	June 30, 2021
TBA	56	"Thu: Daisuke Namikawa × Kaito Ishikawa #11" (Japanese: 木【浪川大輔×石川界人】#11)	N/A	July 1, 2021
TBA	57	"Fri: Tomokazu Seki × Tasuku Hatanaka #11" (Japanese: 金【関智一×畠中祐】#11)	N/A	July 2, 2021
TBA	58	"Weekend: Showtaro Morikubo × Shugo Nakamura #4" (Japanese: WEEKEND【森久保祥太郎×仲村宗悟】 #4)	N/A	July 4, 2021
TBA	59	"Mon: Hiroki Yasumoto × Tomoaki Maeno #12" (Japanese: 月【安元洋貴×前野智昭】#12)	N/A	July 5, 2021
TBA	60	"Tue: Yōko Hikasa × Maaya Uchida #12" (Japanese: 火【日笠陽子×内田真礼】#12)	N/A	July 6, 2021
Hiro Shimono was temporarily replaced by Yōko Hikasa after he tested positive for COVID-19.
TBA	61	"Wed: Mikako Komatsu × Sumire Uesaka × Sora Tokui #12" (Japanese: 水【小松未可子×上坂すみれ×徳井青空】 #12)	Machico	July 7, 2021
TBA	62	"Thu: Daisuke Namikawa × Kaito Ishikawa #12" (Japanese: 木【浪川大輔×石川界人】#12)	N/A	July 8, 2021
TBA	63	"Fri: Tomokazu Seki × Tasuku Hatanaka #12" (Japanese: 金【関智一×畠中祐】#12)	N/A	July 9, 2021
TBA	64	"Mon: Hiroki Yasumoto × Tomoaki Maeno #13" (Japanese: 月【安元洋貴×前野智昭】#13)	N/A	July 12, 2021
TBA	65	"Tue: Maaya Uchida × Tasuku Hatanaka #13" (Japanese: 火【内田真礼×畠中祐】#13)	Miho Okasaki	July 13, 2021
Hiro Shimono was temporarily replaced by Tasuku Hatanaka after he tested positive for COVID-19.
TBA	66	"Wed: Mikako Komatsu × Sumire Uesaka × Sora Tokui #13" (Japanese: 水【小松未可子×上坂すみれ×徳井青空】 #13)	N/A	July 14, 2021
TBA	67	"Thu: Daisuke Namikawa × Kaito Ishikawa #13" (Japanese: 木【浪川大輔×石川界人】#13)	N/A	July 15, 2021
TBA	68	"Fri: Tomokazu Seki × Tasuku Hatanaka #13" (Japanese: 金【関智一×畠中祐】#13)	N/A	July 16, 2021
TBA	69	"Mon: Hiroki Yasumoto × Tomoaki Maeno #14" (Japanese: 月【安元洋貴×前野智昭】#14)	Shunichi Toki	July 19, 2021
TBA	70	"Tue: Hiro Shimono × Maaya Uchida #14" (Japanese: 火【下野紘×内田真礼】#14)	N/A	July 20, 2021
TBA	71	"Wed: Mikako Komatsu × Sumire Uesaka × Sora Tokui #14" (Japanese: 水【小松未可子×上坂すみれ×徳井青空】 #14)	Mayu Sagara	July 21, 2021
TBA	72	"Thu: Daisuke Namikawa × Kaito Ishikawa #14" (Japanese: 木【浪川大輔×石川界人】#14)	N/A	July 22, 2021
TBA	73	"Fri: Tomokazu Seki × Tasuku Hatanaka #14" (Japanese: 金【関智一×畠中祐】#14)	N/A	July 23, 2021
TBA	74	"Mon: Hiroki Yasumoto × Tomoaki Maeno #15" (Japanese: 月【安元洋貴×前野智昭】#15)	N/A	July 26, 2021
TBA	75	"Tue: Hiro Shimono × Maaya Uchida #15" (Japanese: 火【下野紘×内田真礼】#15)	N/A	July 27, 2021
TBA	76	"Wed: Mikako Komatsu × Sumire Uesaka × Sora Tokui #15" (Japanese: 水【小松未可子×上坂すみれ×徳井青空】 #15)	N/A	July 28, 2021
This is Sora Tokui's final episode as a host for this season.
TBA	77	"Thu: Daisuke Namikawa × Kaito Ishikawa #15" (Japanese: 木【浪川大輔×石川界人】#15)	Takuya Eguchi, Yūichirō Umehara	July 29, 2021
TBA	78	"Fri: Tomokazu Seki × Tasuku Hatanaka #15" (Japanese: 金【関智一×畠中祐】#15)	Ryōta Iwasaki	July 30, 2021
TBA	79	"Weekend: Showtaro Morikubo × Shugo Nakamura #5" (Japanese: WEEKEND【森久保祥太郎×仲村宗悟】 #5)	N/A	August 1, 2021
TBA	80	"Mon: Hiroki Yasumoto × Tomoaki Maeno #16" (Japanese: 月【安元洋貴×前野智昭】#16)	N/A	August 2, 2021
TBA	81	"Tue: Hiro Shimono × Maaya Uchida #16" (Japanese: 火【下野紘×内田真礼】#16)	N/A	August 3, 2021
TBA	82	"Wed: Mikako Komatsu × Sumire Uesaka × Aimi #16" (Japanese: 水【小松未可子×上坂すみれ×愛美】 #16)	N/A	August 4, 2021
TBA	83	"Thu: Daisuke Namikawa × Kaito Ishikawa #16" (Japanese: 木【浪川大輔×石川界人】#16)	Haruki Ishiya	August 5, 2021
TBA	84	"Fri: Tomokazu Seki × Tasuku Hatanaka #16" (Japanese: 金【関智一×畠中祐】#16)	N/A	August 6, 2021
TBA	85	"Mon: Hiroki Yasumoto × Tomoaki Maeno #17" (Japanese: 月【安元洋貴×前野智昭】#17)	N/A	August 9, 2021
TBA	86	"Tue: Hiro Shimono × Maaya Uchida #17" (Japanese: 火【下野紘×内田真礼】#17)	N/A	August 10, 2021
TBA	87	"Wed: Mikako Komatsu × Sumire Uesaka × Aimi #17" (Japanese: 水【小松未可子×上坂すみれ×愛美】 #17)	Sae Ōtsuka	August 11, 2021
TBA	88	"Thu: Daisuke Namikawa × Kaito Ishikawa #17" (Japanese: 木【浪川大輔×石川界人】#17)	N/A	August 12, 2021
TBA	89	"Fri: Tomokazu Seki × Tasuku Hatanaka #17" (Japanese: 金【関智一×畠中祐】#17)	N/A	August 13, 2021
TBA	90	"Weekend: Showtaro Morikubo × Shugo Nakamura #6" (Japanese: WEEKEND【森久保祥太郎×仲村宗悟】 #6)	Tsuyoshi Koyama, Tsubasa Yonaga	August 15, 2021
TBA	91	"Mon: Hiroki Yasumoto × Tomoaki Maeno #18" (Japanese: 月【安元洋貴×前野智昭】#18)	Chiaki Kobayashi	August 16, 2021
TBA	92	"Tue: Hiro Shimono × Maaya Uchida #18" (Japanese: 火【下野紘×内田真礼】#18)	Kishō Taniyama	August 17, 2021
TBA	93	"Wed: Mikako Komatsu × Sumire Uesaka × Aimi #18" (Japanese: 水【小松未可子×上坂すみれ×愛美】 #18)	Haruka Kudō, Risa Tsumugi	August 18, 2021
TBA	94	"Thu: Daisuke Namikawa × Kaito Ishikawa #18" (Japanese: 木【浪川大輔×石川界人】#18)	Natsumesanchi	August 19, 2021
TBA	95	"Fri: Tomokazu Seki × Tasuku Hatanaka #18" (Japanese: 金【関智一×畠中祐】#18)	Rica Matsumoto	August 20, 2021
TBA	96	"Mon: Hiroki Yasumoto × Tomoaki Maeno #19" (Japanese: 月【安元洋貴×前野智昭】#19)	N/A	August 23, 2021
TBA	97	"Tue: Hiro Shimono × Maaya Uchida #19" (Japanese: 火【下野紘×内田真礼】#19)	N/A	August 24, 2021
TBA	98	"Wed: Mikako Komatsu × Sumire Uesaka × Aimi #19" (Japanese: 水【小松未可子×上坂すみれ×愛美】 #19)	N/A	August 25, 2021
TBA	99	"Thu: Daisuke Namikawa × Kaito Ishikawa #19" (Japanese: 木【浪川大輔×石川界人】#19)	N/A	August 26, 2021
TBA	100	"Fri: Tomokazu Seki × Tasuku Hatanaka #19" (Japanese: 金【関智一×畠中祐】#19)	N/A	August 27, 2021
TBA	101	"Mon: Hiroki Yasumoto × Tomoaki Maeno #20" (Japanese: 月【安元洋貴×前野智昭】#20)	N/A	September 6, 2021
TBA	102	"Tue: Hiro Shimono × Maaya Uchida #20" (Japanese: 火【下野紘×内田真礼】#20)	N/A	September 7, 2021
TBA	103	"Wed: Mikako Komatsu × Sumire Uesaka × Aimi #20" (Japanese: 水【小松未可子×上坂すみれ×愛美】 #20)	Sayaka Senbongi	September 8, 2021
TBA	104	"Thu: Daisuke Namikawa × Kaito Ishikawa #20" (Japanese: 木【浪川大輔×石川界人】#20)	Nobuhiko Okamoto	September 9, 2021
TBA	105	"Fri: Tomokazu Seki × Tasuku Hatanaka #20" (Japanese: 金【関智一×畠中祐】#20)	N/A	September 10, 2021
TBA	106	"Weekend: Showtaro Morikubo × Shugo Nakamura #7" (Japanese: WEEKEND【森久保祥太郎×仲村宗悟】#7)	Mitsuo Iwata, Tsuyoshi Koyama, Tasuku Hatanaka	September 12, 2021
TBA	107	"Mon: Hiroki Yasumoto × Tomoaki Maeno #21" (Japanese: 月【安元洋貴×前野智昭】#21)	N/A	September 13, 2021
TBA	108	"Tue: Hiro Shimono × Maaya Uchida #21" (Japanese: 火【下野紘×内田真礼】#21)	N/A	September 14, 2021
TBA	109	"Wed: Mikako Komatsu × Sumire Uesaka × Aimi #21" (Japanese: 水【小松未可子×上坂すみれ×愛美】 #21)	Miku Itō	September 15, 2021
TBA	110	"Thu: Daisuke Namikawa × Kaito Ishikawa #21" (Japanese: 木【浪川大輔×石川界人】#21)	Yuuki Shin, Yū Hayashi	September 16, 2021
TBA	111	"Fri: Tomokazu Seki × Tasuku Hatanaka #21" (Japanese: 金【関智一×畠中祐】#21)	N/A	September 17, 2021
TBA	112	"Mon: Hiroki Yasumoto × Tomoaki Maeno #22" (Japanese: 月【安元洋貴×前野智昭】#22)	N/A	September 20, 2021
TBA	113	"Tue: Hiro Shimono × Maaya Uchida #22" (Japanese: 火【下野紘×内田真礼】#22)	N/A	September 21, 2021
TBA	114	"Wed: Mikako Komatsu × Sumire Uesaka × Aimi #22" (Japanese: 水【小松未可子×上坂すみれ×愛美】 #22)	N/A	September 22, 2021
TBA	115	"Thu: Daisuke Namikawa × Kaito Ishikawa #22" (Japanese: 木【浪川大輔×石川界人】#22)	N/A	September 23, 2021
TBA	116	"Fri: Tomokazu Seki × Tasuku Hatanaka #22" (Japanese: 金【関智一×畠中祐】#22)	N/A	September 24, 2021
Specials
TBA	SP1	"Say You to Yo Asobi Weekend: New System Announcement"; Transliteration: "Seiyū to Yo Asobi Weekend: Shintaisei Happyō" (Japanese: 声優と夜あそび WEEKEND 新体制発表SP)	N/A	April 3, 2021
TBA	SP2	"Weekend: Showtaro Morikubo × Shugo Nakamura" (Japanese: 声優と夜あそび WEEKEND【森久保祥太郎×仲村宗悟】)	Tomoko Kaneda, Daisuke Namikawa, Shintarō Asanuma	May 1, 2021
The episode is a special feature for Golden Week.
TBA	SP3	"Weekend: Showtaro Morikubo × Shugo Nakamura" (Japanese: 声優と夜あそび WEEKEND【森久保祥太郎×仲村宗悟】)	Tomoaki Maeno, Sora Tokui, Tasuku Hatanaka	May 2, 2021
The episode is a continuation of the special feature for Golden Week.
TBA	SP4	"1,000th Broadcast Anniversary: Say You to Yo Asobi Special"; Transliteration: "Sen-kai Hōsō Kinnen "Seiyū to Yoasobi" Supesharu" (Japanese: 1,000回放送記念『声優と夜あそび』スペシャル)	N/A	June 14, 2021
The episode is a special celebrating the 1,000th episode broadcast of Say You to Yo Asobi and is hosted by Hiroki Yasumoto and Tomoaki Maeno, taking place of their 9th week broadcast episode.
