= Natsume's Book of Friends: The Waking Rock and the Strange Visitor =

- Teaser poster

Japanese name
- Kanji: 夏目友人帳 石起こしと怪しき来訪者
Transcriptions
- Revised Hepburn: Natsume Yūjin-Chō: Ishi Okoshi to Ayashiki Raihōsha
- Directed by: Takahiro Omori (Chief); Hideki Itō
- Written by: Sadayuki Murai
- Based on: Natsume's Book of Friends by Yuki Midorikawa
- Starring: Hiroshi Kamiya; Kazuhiko Inoue; Kazuma Horie; Akemi Okamura; Takaya Kuroda; Chō; Takashi Matsuyama; Hiroshi Shimozaki; Hisako Kanemoto
- Edited by: Kazuhiko Seki
- Music by: Makoto Yoshimori
- Production company: Shuka
- Distributed by: Aniplex
- Release date: January 16, 2021
- Running time: 55 minutes
- Country: Japan
- Language: Japanese

Natsume's Book of Friends: The Waking Rock and the Strange Visitor (Japanese: 夏目友人帳 石起こしと怪しき来訪者, Hepburn: Natsume Yūjin-Chō: Ishi Okoshi to Ayashiki Raihōsha) is a 2021 Japanese animated film based on the Yuki Midorikawa's manga and anime Natsume's Book of Friends. The film is produced by Shuka and directed by Hideki Itō under the chief direction of Takahiro Omori. It was released in Japan on January 16, 2021.

== Plot ==
This short 2021 movie is composed of two new (23 minute) standalone stories that could have been added to season six, but instead, were combined into one film: The first story: "Ishi Okoshi /The Stone Waker": Natsume searches for Madara, his missing Bodyguard, and runs into "Mitsumi", a diminutive youkai who is on a mission as the "Ishi Okoshi," the waker of "Gantetsu", a powerful water spirit. Natsume helps the little yoki repay his debt of kindness to his master by helping him awaken the Ayashiki from his deep slumber.

The second story; "Ayashiki Raihousha/The Strange Visitor)" is about Natsume's friend Tanuma who has strong spiritual power but it only allows him to see the echoes of the past at the temple where he and his father live. Tanuma begins acting distant and his behavior has Natsume worried about a strange new friend of Tanuma, is this stranger connected to the concerning malaise affecting Tanuma? Hints of the past answer long standing questions and involves a water horse-like spirit whose name in Natsume's incredibly powerful and dangerous Book of Friends.

== Voice cast ==
Character	Japanese voice
Takashi Natsume	Hiroshi Kamiya
Madara/"Nyanko-sensei"	Kazuhiko Inoue
Kaname Tanuma	Kazuma Horie
Hinoe	Akemi Okamura
Misuzu	Takaya Kuroda
Chobihige	Chō
One-Eyed Middle Class Yokai	Takashi Matsuyama
Ox-Faced Middle Class Yokai	Hiroshi Shimozaki
Mitsumi	Hisako Kanemoto
Iron Rock	Tetsuo Kanao
Horned Yōkai	Hiroki Matsukawa
Little Jizō-Faced Yōkai	Sōshirō Hori
Little Demon-Faced Yōkai	Manami Hanawa
Ancestral Stone Yōkai's	Yūichi Hose; Mitsuki Nakamura; Daiki Yamazaki; Takeyoshi Hayakawa
Sasame	Kohsuke Toriumi
Satoru Nishimura	Ryōhei Kimura
Atsushi Kitamoto	Hisayoshi Suganuma
Tanuma's Father	Yasunori Matsumoto

== Production ==
The cast of the television series also returned to reprise their roles. Anly perform song Star Wink ~ Star Wink ~.

== Release ==
The film was released in Japan on January 16, 2021. In Japan, the film will be released on Blu-ray and DVD on May 26, 2021. Funimation streamed the film as two OVA episodes.
