= Ryota Iwasaki =

Japanese voice actor

- 岩崎 諒太
- Born: 1 July 1986 (age 40)
- Occupation: Actor
- Years active: 2016–present
- Employer: Atomic Monkey
- Notable work: Hypnosis Mic: Division Rap Battle: Rhyme Anima as Nurude Sasara; Noblesse as Han Shinwoo; The Yuzuki Family's Four Sons as Hayato Yuzuki; Snack Basue as Morita; Medaka Kuroiwa Is Impervious to My Charms as Medaka Kuroiwa

Ryota Iwasaki (Japanese: 岩崎 諒太, Hepburn: Iwasaki Ryōta; born 1 July 1986) is a Japanese actor from Osaka Prefecture, affiliated with Atomic Monkey. He is known for starring as Nurude Sasara in Hypnosis Mic: Division Rap Battle: Rhyme Anima, Han Shinwoo in Noblesse, the younger Sakata brother in Eien no 831, Hayato Yuzuki in The Yuzuki Family's Four Sons, Morita in Snack Basue, Kuroshio in The Fable, Harada Sanosuke in Blue Miburo, and Medaka Kuroiwa in Medaka Kuroiwa Is Impervious to My Charms.

== Biography ==
Ryota Iwasaki, a native of Osaka Prefecture, was born on 1 July 1986, the eldest of three brothers. He began watching anime as a child, and while in the fifth grade of elementary school, he listened to the radio show Hayashibara Megumi no Heartful Station and became interested in voice acting. After graduating from an agricultural high school in 2005, he studied at Yoyogi Animation Academy's Osaka campus at his parents' encouragement, graduating in 2007. He worked part-time jobs to save for tuition, including as a telephone appointment maker. He was then educated at the Atomic Monkey Voice Acting and Acting Institute, graduating as a member of the fifth class.

He later joined Tomokazu Seki's theatre troupe HeroHero Q. He played Iriya in HeroHero Q's 2016 stage adaptation of Blade of the Immortal, before returning for the May 2018 finale at the Zenrosai Hall Space Zero in Shibuya, Tokyo. He also appeared in Herohero Q's stage adaptation of Mazinger Z, also at Zenrosai Hall Space Zero, from November to December 2022.

After voicing Inasa Yoarashi in My Hero Academia and Noriyuki Nakamachi in Karakuri Circus, he starred as Nurude Sasara in Hypnosis Mic: Division Rap Battle: Rhyme Anima. He later starred as Yusuke Tashiro in Noblesse, the younger Sakata brother in Eien no 831, and Hayato Yuzuki in The Yuzuki Family's Four Sons. In 2024, he was cast as Morita in Snack Basue, Kuroshio in The Fable, Harada Sanosuke in Blue Miburo, and Medaka Kuroiwa in Medaka Kuroiwa Is Impervious to My Charms.

While a guest for the 30 July 2021 episode of the variety show Say You to Yo Asobi, he had a dedicated segment where he talked about his life to provide information for his Wikipedia article.

His hobbies and skills are karaoke and impersonations.

== Filmography ==
=== Animated television ===
Year	Title	Role(s)	Ref
2017	Pingu in the City	Pingu	
2018	My Hero Academia	Inasa Yoarashi	
2018	Karakuri Circus	Noriyuki Nakamachi	
2019	Kaiju Step Wandabada	Kureron-chan	
2020	Hypnosis Mic: Division Rap Battle: Rhyme Anima	Nurude Sasara	
2020	Poccolies	Kangaroo-shi	
2020	Noblesse	Han Shinwoo	
2021	Okashi na Sabaku no Suna to Manu	Manu	
2021	Iii Icecrin	Mamango	
2022	Eien no 831	Younger Sakata brother	
2023	The Yuzuki Family's Four Sons	Hayato Yuzuki	
2023	Firefighter Daigo: Rescuer in Orange	Watari	
2024	Snack Basue	Morita	
2024	The Fable	Kuroshio	
2024	Blue Miburo	Harada Sanosuke	
2024	A Terrified Teacher at Ghoul School!	Izuna Hatanaka	
2025	Medaka Kuroiwa Is Impervious to My Charms	Medaka Kuroiwa	
2025	Hell Teacher: Jigoku Sensei Nube	Katsuya Kimura	
2025	Yano-kun's Ordinary Days	Tanaka	
2026	Akane-banashi	Kimihisa Kashio	

=== Animated film ===
Year	Title	Role(s)	Ref
2022	Guardy Girls		

=== Original net animation ===
Year	Title	Role(s)	Ref
2020	Cap Kakumei Bottleman	Hanta Minezaki	

=== Stage ===
Year	Title	Role(s)	Ref
2016	Blade of the Immortal	Iriya	
2022	Mazinger Z		
