= Kenji Kamiyama =

Japanese anime director

- 神山 健治
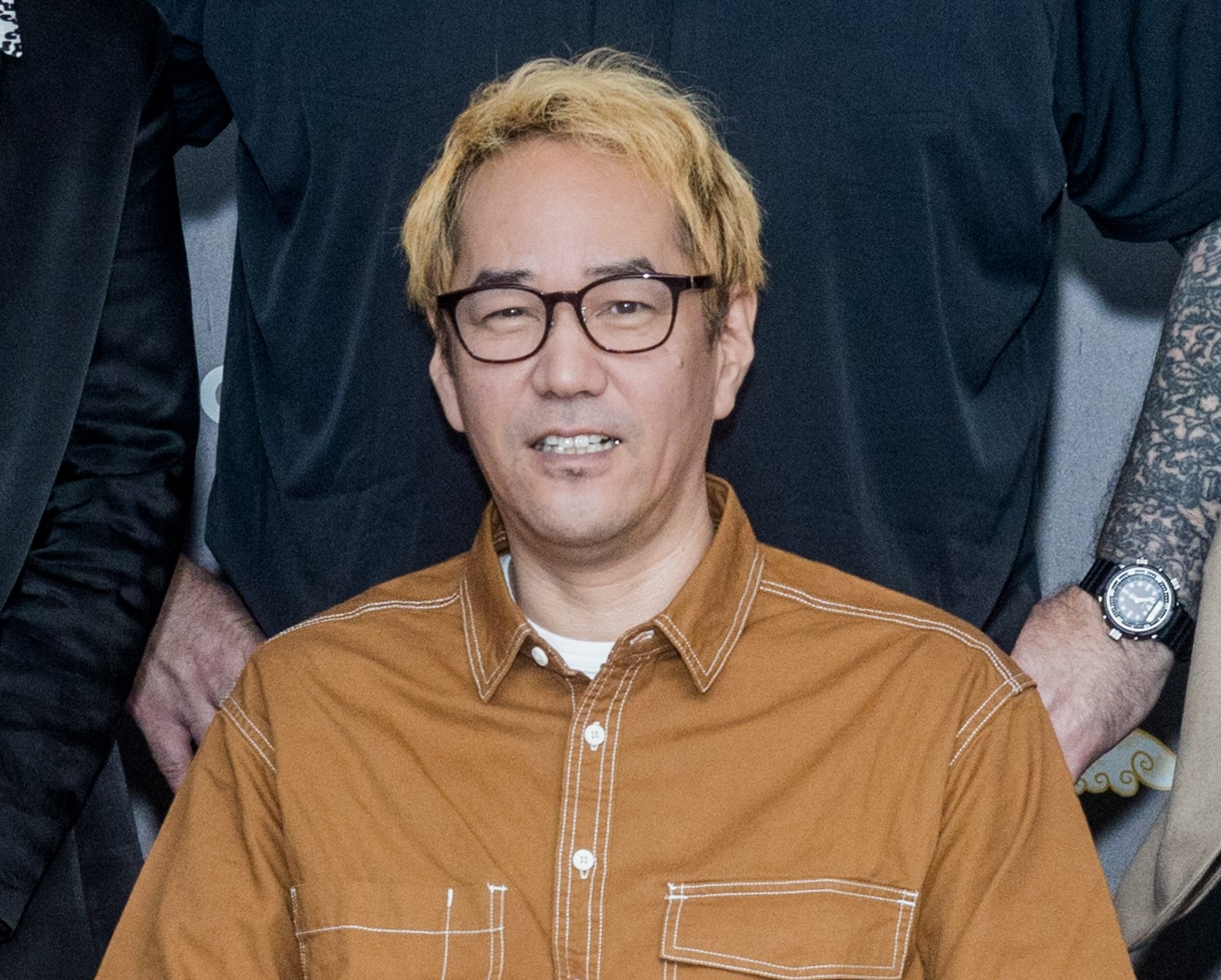
- Kamiyama in 2023
- Born: March 20, 1966 (age 60); Saitama Prefecture, Japan
- Occupations: director, writer
- Years active: 1987-present
- Website: www.ph9.jp

Kenji Kamiyama (神山 健治, Kamiyama Kenji; born on March 20, 1966) is a Japanese director and writer, best known for Ghost in the Shell: Stand Alone Complex.

== Career ==
After working as a background artist for productions such as Akira and Kiki's Delivery Service, Kamiyama joined Production I.G, contributing the screenplay of Blood: The Last Vampire and working as an animation director for Jin-Roh. In 2002, Kamiyama made his directorial debut with MiniPato, followed by Ghost in the Shell: Stand Alone Complex. Stand Alone Complex was produced with an 800 million yen investment, and Kamiyama decided to make the series as a "relative" to the manga and film, serving as a separate parallel world from both. The series was followed by Ghost in the Shell: S.A.C. 2nd GIG. In 2007, after almost six years of working on the Stand Alone Complex world, he directed the TV series Guardian of the Sacred Spirit. In 2008, it was announced that Kamiyama would direct and write Eden of the East. The series ran in 2009 from April 9 to June 18.

Kamiyama and Shinji Aramaki directed Blade Runner: Black Lotus, an anime for Adult Swim and Crunchyroll, which was released in 2021 and 2022. On August 2, 2021, it was announced that Kamiyama would act as both director and writer of the feature-length anime work, Eien no 831 (transl. Eternal 831). The movie was broadcast in January 2022 on Wowow. Kamiyama directed The Lord of the Rings: The War of the Rohirrim, which released on December 13, 2024. Kamiyama described the film as an unprecedented opportunity despite the challenges that come from developing such project and being different from the thematic approaches he took on his other works. For the main character, Héra, Kamiyama suggested the writers take inspiration from the historical female leader Æthelflæd as she played a similar role, and Tolkien was inspired by such historical figures.

== Filmography ==
=== Television series and OVA ===
Year	Title	Role	Ref.
1987	DuckTales	backgrounds	
1988–1989	Patlabor	backgrounds	
1990–1991	The Hakkenden	art director	
1991	Burn Up!	art director	
1993–1995	The Hakkenden: A New Saga	art director	
1994	Genocyber	art director	
1999–2000	Wild Arms: Twilight Venom	scripts for episodes 3, 10 and 21	
1999–2000	Medabots	storyboards for episodes 19, 34, 41, 48 and episode director for 34, 41, 48	
2002	Mini Pato	director	
2002–2003	Ghost in the Shell: Stand Alone Complex	director, series composition, script, storyboard, chief writer	
2004–2005	Ghost in the Shell: S.A.C. 2nd GIG	director, series composition, script, storyboard, chief writer	
2007	Moribito: Guardian of the Spirit	director, script	
2009	Eden of the East	director, series composition, screenplay, storyboard, chief writer	
2014	Mou Hitotsu no Mirai O.	director	
2019–2023	Ultraman	director	
2020–2022	Ghost in the Shell: SAC_2045	director	
2021	Star Wars: Visions	director, script short The Ninth Jedi	
2021–2022	Blade Runner: Black Lotus	director	
2026	Star Wars: Visions Presents – The Ninth Jedi	supervising director, stories writer	
2027	Mobile Suit Gundam RG: XARX-ZERO	director, series composition	

=== Film ===
Year	Title	Role	Ref.
1991	Roujin Z	assistant art director	
1998	Jin-Roh: The Wolf Brigade	unit director	
2000	Blood: The Last Vampire	screenplay, planning assistance	
2006	Ghost in the Shell: Stand Alone Complex - Solid State Society	director, script, storyboard	
2007	Eat and Run: 6 Beautiful Grifters	segment director Dandelion: Mabu of the Dining Hall	
2009	Eden of the East: The King of Eden	director, screenplay	
2010	Eden of the East: Paradise Lost	director, screenplay	
2012	009 Re:Cyborg	director, script	
2016	Cyborg 009: Call of Justice	chief director	
2017	Napping Princess	director, screenplay	
2022	Eien no 831	director, screenplay	
2024	The Lord of the Rings: The War of the Rohirrim	director	
