= Snack Basue =

Japanese manga series

- First tankōbon volume cover

スナックバス江 (Sunakku Basue)
- Genre: Cooking; Comedy; Parody
- Manga
- Written by: Forbidden Shibukawa
- Published by: Shueisha
- Imprint: Young Jump Comics
- Magazine: Weekly Young Jump
- Original run: July 13, 2017 – May 29, 2025
- Volumes: 18
- Anime television series
- Directed by: Minoru Ashina
- Written by: Minoru Ashina
- Music by: Shōta Kowashi
- Studio: Studio Puyukai
- Licensed by: Crunchyroll: SA/SEA: Medialink
- Original network: Tokyo MX, BS Asahi, HTB, AT-X
- Original run: January 13, 2024 – April 5, 2024
- Episodes: 13 (Note: Episode 13 is exclusive to Amazon Prime and other streaming sites.)
- icon

Snack Basue (Japanese: スナックバス江, Hepburn: Sunakku Basue) is a Japanese manga series written and illustrated by Forbidden Shibukawa. It was serialized in Shueisha's seinen manga magazine Weekly Young Jump from July 2017 to May 2025, with its chapters collected in 18 tankōbon volumes. An anime television series adaptation produced by Studio Puyukai aired from January to April 2024.

== Characters ==
Akemi (明美)
Voiced by: Rie Takahashi
Basue (バス江)
Voiced by: Kimiko Saitō
Yamada (山田)
Voiced by: Yōhei Azakami
Tatsu (タツ)
Voiced by: Fukushi Ochiai
Morita (森田)
Voiced by: Ryota Iwasaki
Kazama (風間)
Voiced by: Jun Fukushima
Kosame (小雨)
Voiced by: Yume Miyamoto
Tomiki (東美樹)
Voiced by: Jun Kasama
Kawa-chan (カワちゃん)
Voiced by: Daiki Hamano
Hero (勇者, Yūsha)
Voiced by: Ryōsuke Takahashi

== Media ==
=== Manga ===
Written and illustrated by Forbidden Shibukawa, Snack Basue was serialized in Shueisha's seinen manga magazine Weekly Young Jump from July 13, 2017, to May 29, 2025. Shueisha collected its chapters in 18 tankōbon volumes, released from February 19, 2018, to July 17, 2025.

==== Volumes ====
No.	Japanese release date	Japanese ISBN
1	February 19, 2018	978-4-08-890861-8
2	July 19, 2018	978-4-08-891066-6
3	December 19, 2018	978-4-08-891166-3
4	April 19, 2019	978-4-08-891252-3
5	October 18, 2019	978-4-08-891417-6
6	March 19, 2020	978-4-08-891496-1
7	September 18, 2020	978-4-08-891615-6
8	February 19, 2021	978-4-08-891779-5
9	September 17, 2021	978-4-08-892043-6
10	February 18, 2022	978-4-08-892213-3
11	July 19, 2022	978-4-08-892369-7
12	November 17, 2022	978-4-08-892490-8
13	June 19, 2023	978-4-08-892685-8
14	January 18, 2024	978-4-08-893107-4
15	June 19, 2024	978-4-08-893281-1
16	January 17, 2025	978-4-08-893503-4
17	May 19, 2025	978-4-08-893663-5
18	July 17, 2025	978-4-08-893775-5

=== Anime ===
In June 2023, it was announced that the manga would receive an anime adaptation. It was later confirmed to be television series, animated by Studio Puyukai and directed by Minoru Ashina, who wrote and supervised the series' scripts, as well as serving as animation director. Tomiyama served as character designer and the chief animation director, Jun'ichi Ōkubo as compositing director of photography, Fumiyuki Go as sound director, with Yuji Furuya credited for sound effects. Bit Groove Promotion is credited for sound production. Shōta Kowashi composed the music, and Pony Canyon is credited for music production. The series aired from January 13 to March 30, 2024, on Tokyo MX and other networks. (Note: Tokyo MX lists the series premiere on January 12 at 25:05, which is effectively January 13 at 1:05 a.m. JST.) The opening theme song is "Ura Omote Aquarium" (ウラオモテアクアリウム) by Otonari feat. Ririko and Ryōhei Sataka. Crunchyroll licensed the series outside of Asia. Medialink licensed the series in South and Southeast Asia and streaming it on the Ani-One Asia YouTube channel.

==== Episodes ====
No.	Title (Note: All English titles are taken from Crunchyroll.)	Original release date
1	"Let’s Stay Together (Welcome to Basue)"; Transliteration: "Let’s Stay Together (Yōkoso Basue e)" (Japanese: Let’s Stay Together (ようこそバス江へ))	January 13, 2024
1	"I Ain’t Gonna Stand For It (Everyone Has Different Tastes)"; Transliteration: "I Ain’t Gonna Stand For It (Konomi wa Sorezore)" (Japanese: I Ain’t Gonna Stand For It (好みはそれぞれ))	January 13, 2024
1	"God’s Gift To The World (Men Are...)"; Transliteration: "God’s Gift To The World (Otoko tte……)" (Japanese: God’s Gift To The World (男って……))	January 13, 2024
2	"Come Rain or Come Shine (Kosame-chan Clocks In)"; Transliteration: "Come Rain or Come Shine (Kosame-chan wa Irimasu)" (Japanese: Come Rain or Come Shine (小雨ちゃんはいります))	January 20, 2024
2	"Sweet Baby (If It's Sweet Love, Then...)"; Transliteration: "Sweet Baby (Umai Ainara…)" (Japanese: Sweet Baby (甘い愛なら…))	January 20, 2024
2	"Still Waiting (I Dream of You)"; Transliteration: "Still Waiting (Anata o Yumemiteru)" (Japanese: Still Waiting (あなたを夢見てる))	January 20, 2024
3	"You're Still My Brother (If It's For You, My Cutie)"; Transliteration: "You're Still My Brother (Kawaī Kimi no Tamenara)" (Japanese: You're Still My Brother (可愛い君のためなら))	January 27, 2024
3	"As The Years Go Passing By (Straight to My Heart)"; Transliteration: "As The Years Go Passing By (Gut to Kichauwa)" (Japanese: As The Years Go Passing By (グッときちゃうわ))	January 27, 2024
3	"Try Me (To The One I've Fallen For)"; Transliteration: "Try Me (Horeta Anta ni)" (Japanese: Try Me (惚れたあんたに))	January 27, 2024
4	"There Is Love (When You Fall in Love)"; Transliteration: "There Is Love (Koi ni Ochitara)" (Japanese: There Is Love (恋に落ちたら))	February 3, 2024
4	"If I Should Die Tonight (I'm Done for Tonight)"; Transliteration: "If I Should Die Tonight (Konya wa Mō Owari)" (Japanese: If I Should Die Tonight (今夜はもう終わり))	February 3, 2024
4	"Soul Shadows (It Was Like an Illusion)"; Transliteration: "Soul Shadows (Sore wa Maboroshi Mitai ni)" (Japanese: Soul Shadows (それは幻みたいに))	February 3, 2024
5	"Get On The Good Foot (Put Best Foot Forward)"; Transliteration: "Get On The Good Foot (Omi Ashi Haiken)" (Japanese: Get On The Good Foot (おみあし拝見))	February 10, 2024
5	"Talkin' Loud And Saying Nothin' (Don't Say Mean Things.)"; Transliteration: "Talkin' Loud And Saying Nothin' (Waruguchi wa Dameyo)" (Japanese: Talkin' Loud And Saying Nothin' (悪口はダメよ))	February 10, 2024
5	"My Funny Valentine (To My Dearest love)" Transliteration: "My Funny Valentine (Aisuru Anata e)" (Japanese: My Funny Valentine (愛するあなたへ))	February 10, 2024
6	"Hello Stranger (Seeds of Salvation...)"; Transliteration: "Hello Stranger (Soshite Densetsu e……)" (Japanese: Hello Stranger (そして伝説へ……))	February 17, 2024
6	"What A Wonderful World (Welcome to the Lifestyle of the Wonderful Other World)"; Transliteration: "What A Wonderful World (Kono Subarashī Isekai Seikatsu ni Yōkoso)" (Japanese: What A Wonderful World (この素晴らしい異世界生活にようこそ))	February 17, 2024
6	"As (Let's Meet at That Place.)"; Transliteration: "As (Ano Basho de Atsumarō)" (Japanese: As (あの場所で集まろう))	February 17, 2024
6	"Mean Old World (It's of the Past...)"; Transliteration: "Mean Old World (Mukashi no Hanashiyo…)" (Japanese: Mean Old World (昔の話よ…))	February 17, 2024
7	"Closer (Don't Leave Me Behind)"; Transliteration: "Closer (Oiteikanaide)" (Japanese: Closer (置いていかないで))	February 24, 2024
7	"What A Fool Believes (Don't Make Fun of Me)"; Transliteration: "What A Fool Believes (Baka ni Shinaide)" (Japanese: What A Fool Believes (馬鹿にしないで))	February 24, 2024
7	"God Blessed Our Love (None of Your Business)"; Transliteration: "God Blessed Our Love (Okina Osewayo)" (Japanese: God Blessed Our Love (おおきなお世話よ))	February 24, 2024
8	"None Of Us Are Free (See Me as I Am); In The Midnight Hour (Dedicated to the Strong Enemies......!)"; Transliteration: "None Of Us Are Free (Arinomama no Watashi o Mite); In The Midnight Hour (Kyōteki ni Sasagu……！)" (Japanese: None Of Us Are Free (ありのままの私を見て); In The Midnight Hour (強敵に捧ぐ……!))	March 2, 2024
8	"Twinkle Twinkle Little Me (Embrace Your Inner Child)"; Transliteration: "Twinkle Twinkle Little Me (Tokiniha Dōshin ni Kaette)" (Japanese: Twinkle Twinkle Little Me (時には童心に返って))	March 2, 2024
8	"Angel (That Honest Girl)"; Transliteration: "Angel (Sunaona Ano Musume)" (Japanese: Angel (素直なあの娘))	March 2, 2024
9	"Release Yourself (You're Thinking Too Much)"; Transliteration: "Release Yourself (Kangaesugiyo)" (Japanese: Release Yourself (考えすぎよ))	March 9, 2024
9	"Bad, Bad Whiskey (The Me Who Can't Get Drunk)"; Transliteration: "Bad, Bad Whiskey (Yoenai Watashi)" (Japanese: Bad, Bad Whiskey (酔えないわたし))	March 9, 2024
9	"Can't Get Any Harder (Don't Make Me Wait)"; Transliteration: "Can't Get Any Harder (Gaman Sasenaide)" (Japanese: Can't Get Any Harder (ガマンさせないで))	March 9, 2024
10	"Friend To Friend (Please Be My Friend?)"; Transliteration: "Friend To Friend (Watashi to Tomodachi ni Natte)" (Japanese: Friend To Friend (私と友達になって♥))	March 16, 2024
10	"Wednesday Night (How About a Night Like This?)"; Transliteration: "Wednesday Night (Konna Yoru wa Dō?)" (Japanese: Wednesday Night (こんな夜はどう？))	March 16, 2024
10	"Only Sixteen (It Must Be Nice Being Young)"; Transliteration: "Only Sixteen (Wakai tte Inā)" (Japanese: Only Sixteen (若いっていいなぁ))	March 16, 2024
11	"Under The Cherry Moon (As Long As You Love Me)"; Transliteration: "Under The Cherry Moon (Anata ga Aishitekurerunara)" (Japanese: Under The Cherry Moon (あなたが愛してくれるなら))	March 23, 2024
11	"Adult Education (An Adult's Reason)"; Transliteration: "Adult Education (Otona no Jijō)" (Japanese: Adult Education (おとなの事情))	March 23, 2024
11	"Solitude (I Don't Have a Lot of Friends)"; Transliteration: "Solitude (Boku wa Tomodachi ga Sukunai)" (Japanese: Solitude (僕は友達が少ない))	March 23, 2024
12	"The Great Pretender (I'll Become Who I Want to Be)"; Transliteration: "The Great Pretender (Naritai Watashi ni)" (Japanese: The Great Pretender (なりたい私に))	March 30, 2024
12	"Let Me Into Your World (It's Hard to Understand)"; Transliteration: "Let Me Into Your World (Rikai Suru no wa Muzukashī)" (Japanese: Let Me Into Your World (理解するのは難しい))	March 30, 2024
12	"Trouble Man (Who Do You Think You Are?)"; Transliteration: "Trouble Man (Anta Naninanoyo)" (Japanese: Trouble Man (あんた何なのよ))	March 30, 2024
13	"Risen To The Top (If You're a Man, You Desire)"; Transliteration: "Risen To The Top (Otokonaraba Hossuru Mono)" (Japanese: Risen To The Top (男ならば欲するもの))	April 5, 2024
13	"Try A Little Tenderness (With Kindness)"; Transliteration: "Try A Little Tenderness (Yasashīki Mochi de)" (Japanese: Try A Little Tenderness (やさしいきもちで))	April 5, 2024
13	"Just One Look (A Gift From The Heart)"; Transliteration: "Just One Look (Kokoro Kara no Okurimono)" (Japanese: Just One Look (心からの贈り物))	April 5, 2024
