= The Case Files of Jeweler Richard =

Japanese light novel series

- First volume of light novel cover

宝石商リチャード氏の謎鑑定 (Hōsekisho Richard-shi no Nazo Kantei)
- Genre: Mystery, Detective
- Light novel
- Written by: Nanako Tsujimura
- Illustrated by: Utako Yukihiro
- Published by: Shueisha
- English publisher: NA: Seven Seas Entertainment
- Imprint: Shueisha Orange Bunko
- Original run: December 17, 2015 – November 19, 2025
- Volumes: 14 + 3 short story collections
- Manga
- Written by: Nanako Tsujimura
- Illustrated by: Mika Akatsuki
- Published by: Ichijinsha
- English publisher: NA: Seven Seas Entertainment
- Magazine: Monthly Comic Zero Sum
- Original run: November 28, 2019 – present
- Volumes: 7
- Anime television series
- Directed by: Tarou Iwasaki
- Written by: Mariko Kunisawa
- Music by: Nobuko Toda
- Studio: Shuka
- Licensed by: Crunchyroll; SEA: Muse Communication
- Original network: AT-X, Tokyo MX, BS11, Wowow
- Original run: January 9, 2020 – March 26, 2020
- Episodes: 12

The Case Files of Jeweler Richard (Japanese: 宝石商リチャード氏の謎鑑定, Hepburn: Hōsekisho Richard-shi no Nazo Kantei; lit. 'The Mystery Appraisals of Mr. Richard the Jeweler') is a Japanese mystery light novel series written by Nanako Tsujimura and illustrated by Utako Yukihiro. Shueisha has published fourteen main volumes from December 2015 to November 2025 under their Shueisha Orange Bunko imprint, as well as three collections of short stories. A manga adaptation with art by Mika Akatsuki has been serialized in Ichijinsha's josei manga magazine Monthly Comic Zero Sum since November 2019. An anime television series adaptation by Shuka aired from January to March 2020.

== Plot ==
=== Volume One ===
Seigi Nakata runs across a beautiful foreign man named Richard Ranasinghe de Vulpian being attacked by drunkards near Yoyogi Park on his way home late at night from his job as a security guard. He rushes to Richard's rescue and joins him at the police station, where Richard reveals that he is an Englishman working in Japan as a jeweler. Seigi then brings a ring he inherited from his grandmother to Richard in hopes of having the gemstone identified. Richard informs him that the ring was stolen many decades ago. Seigi asks Richard to help him find the owner. By a twist of fate, Richard is already acquainted with the owner and brings Seigi to see her. There, the woman listens to the story of Seigi's poor pickpocket grandmother and returns the ring to him with her blessing.

Following this adventure, Richard offers Seigi a job at his jewelry shop and Seigi happily accepts and begins his employment under Richard. The rest of the first volume slowly introduces Seigi to the world of gemology, where he learns about mineral names for gemstones and what customers are looking for in gems, including cases where he's introduced to a lesbian woman using a ruby as a way to decide her future, a bartender trying to protect his hostess girlfriend from alcoholism, and a widower unsure of what to do with his late wife's engagement ring.

The book ends with Seigi turning down an internship at another company, saying he prefers to work with Richard, as he rather likes his boss.

=== Volume Two ===
The second volume of the series begins to delve deeper into the darker side of the gemstone industry. It includes an elementary school student hoping a gemstone can protect his family and a woman trying to cope with a breakup by buying herself a garnet ring before delving into more the darker stores.

The titular "Emerald" case opens with Richard being asked to solve a possible haunting related to an emerald necklace, and after Seigi ropes him into helping, he instead uncovers a drug trafficking ploy using emeralds as payment and smuggling them across continents via the rental of ballet costumes. Richard ends up having to make multiple statements to the DEA before he and Seigi attend a ballet performance together.

Following that, Seigi meets by chance an old friend and clubmate from his karate days and winds up discovering the friend and protector he admired has wound up taking advantage of a woman with dementia and trying to sell her treasured fire opal. The story ends with Seigi's old friend declaring he never wants to see Seigi again, as someone like Seigi can't understand how someone could fall so far. Seigi then cries in Richard's car while Richard comforts him.

=== Volume Three ===
During volume three cases, it becomes quickly apparent Richard is not acting entirely himself. While he manages the first case, Topaz, relatively normally, in the following case, Turquoise, he takes on the alias "Edward Baxter" and barges into a jewelry scam shop to scam them back and terrify them into hiding.

While Richard refuses to explain any of these actions, during the auction in the Jade case, he is confronted by a fellow jeweler working on behalf of foreign clients to purchase a particular carved jadeite item. He refers to Richard as "Lord Claremont" and warns Seigi from working with Richard, and that Richard is only using him and Richard's own beauty for his own purposes and does not care about anyone else. Seigi refuses to listen to the man, and Richard only explains that various things happened with his wealthy family back in England.

When Seigi's friend Tanimoto is deciding whether or not to pursue and engagement in the following case, and he is accordingly deciding whether or not to confess his own romantic feelings to her, Richard tells a story about himself as if it's another person, detailing a former engagement broken off for monetary reasons. When he finally convinces Seigi to pursue Tanimoto, he vanishes without a word, leaving only a cryptic note on his shop that it will be closed until further notice.

Once Seigi handles the situation with Tanimoto and they both remain single, he discovers the note and Richard's phone disconnected, where the book ends on a cliffhanger.

== Structure ==
The series is organized into three distinct arcs, each marked by a time skip and with distinct narrative styles. The first arc encompasses the first six volumes. Each are divided into four distinct cases each named after a gemstone and featuring specific customers, with a bonus case matching the format but much shorter at the end. They are told almost exclusively from Seigi's first-person perspective.

After a two-year time skip between volumes six and seven, the novel format changes for volumes seven to 10 to add a short prologue from Richard's voice in first person before returning to Seigi, and each book is divided into chapters covering days instead of distinct short stories or novellas involving specific gems and customers. The novels in arc two are much more holistic stories.

After another three year time skip, volume 11 picks up with a short prologue from Seigi and then follows a new narrator named Minoru in third person. The case format is back, but no longer named after gemstones but characters. Seigi also receives a short "half case" to narrate at the end focusing on himself and Richard.

== Characters ==
Richard Ranasinghe de Vulpian (リチャード・ラナシンハ・ドヴルピアン, Richādo Ranashinha do Vurupian)
Voiced by: Takahiro Sakurai, Hibiku Yamamura (child)^{Ep. 10 credits}
An English jeweler with customers worldwide, Richard is an androgynous beauty who Seigi likens to a "living jewel." He was born and raised in England by his aunt and uncle, spending summers visiting Provence, France to see his French mother, Catherine. He was privately tutored as a young child and then attended a boarding school in Switzerland before beginning his studies at Cambridge.
Richard is a polyglot who speaks fluent Japanese even better than some native Japanese speakers and at least a dozen other languages across the novels. Before becoming a jeweler, he intended to become an English teacher to foreign speakers. He was taught Japanese from a young age and took a vested interest in the country and culture.
He is incredibly picky when it comes to milk tea and carries around his own tea leaves from Sri Lanka in a tin to make it. He also has a strong sweet tooth and eats sweets more often than more typical savory meals and is easily bribed with candies and desserts.
He offers Seigi a part-time job when opening his jewelry store "Jewelry Etranger" in Ginza.
Seigi Nakata (中田正義, Nakata Seigi)
Voiced by: Yuma Uchida, Risae Matsuda (child)
Seigi begins the series as a university student at Kasaba University, hoping to become a public servant in order to repay his mother for her investment in him. He was very attached to his grandmother as a child, who gave him the strong sense of justice implied by his name, which means "justice" in Japanese. He has been teased for his name in the past.
Seigi is friendly and honest to a fault. While Richard finds these traits endearing, it's sometimes hard for him tell what Seigi's intentions are.
Seigi has post traumatic stress disorder owing to a childhood filled with domestic violence on the part of his abusive father and fears becoming like him. He was enrolled in karate to deal with his anger issues as a child, and later takes up therapy for the same issues when he suffers a relapse.
He is skilled at household chores as a whole, and his specialty is pudding.
Shōko Tanimoto (谷本晶子, Tanimoto Shōko)
Voiced by: Kana Hanazawa
One of Seigi's classmates in college. She is very knowledgeable on mineralogy, having studied it in high school and often provides Seigi insight on the subject. Seigi has feelings for her, but has a hard time admitting them. Tanimoto, however, is asexual and aromantic and they settle into a close platonic relationship as the series progresses. She has an interest in teaching science to young middle school students.
Haruyoshi Shimomura (下村晴良, Shimomura Haruyoshi)
Voiced by: Yūichi Iguchi
One of Seigi's friends from college. His role differs dramatically between the novels and anime, as his original appearances were adapted out and his character replaced other minor figures from Seigi's college.
He is quite supportive of Seigi's pursuits and is one of Seigi's only former classmates to understand Seigi's desire to live outside typical expectations. He is heavily interested in music. In volume 5, he quits college to move to Spain in order to pursue flamenco guitar and music as a career. As of volume 10, he appears to have been successful.
Seigi recommends him as a Japanese tutor for Henry and they begin a fast friendship, despite Henry using the alias "Enrique Wabisabi." When Henry admits the ruse, Shimomura does not fully understand the confession in English, but happily greets his friend in person for the first time with a hug.
Jeffrey Claremont (ジェフリー・クレアモント, Jefurī Kureamonto)
Voiced by: Masaya Matsukaze, Rie Kawamura (child) ^{Ep. 10 credits}
Jeffrey is Richard's elder cousin on his father's side and was raised with him like a brother. Until Richard was in college, he considered Jeffrey to be the most important person in his life.
Jeffrey supports Richard and Seigi through both financial means and investigative information. He also gives Seigi advice on becoming Richard's secretary.
Henry Claremont (ヘンリー・クレアモント, Henrī Kureamonto)
Voiced by: Yuki Kaji
Henry is Richard's elder cousin and Jeffrey's older brother. He favors the piano, and is the only Claremont to not speak Japanese on his introduction, although he does pick it up later. During Richard's college years, he suffered an illness that still affects him years later.
He becomes the tenth Earl Claremont after the death of his father.
Saul Ranasinghe Ali (シャウル・ラナシンハ・アリー, Shauru Ranashinha Arī)
Voiced by: Madoka Shiga
Saul is a Sri Lankan man who serves as Richard's mentor and boss. He gave his last name to Richard for use after helping Richard recover from past trauma.

== Media ==
=== Light novel ===
In the initial Seven Seas Entertainment translation of volume 6, a chapter was omitted. After the issue was brought to the attention of Tsujimura, Seven Seas Entertainment apologized for this error on Twitter and offered a reprinted version with the chapter, pushing back the release of the print version several months.

Volume list
No.	Japanese title	English title	Release date	English release date
1	宝石商リチャード氏の謎鑑定	The Case Files of Jeweler Richard	December 17, 2015	October 11, 2022
2	宝石商リチャード氏の謎鑑定 エメラルドは踊る	The Case Files of Jeweler Richard: The Dancing Emeralds	May 20, 2016	December 6, 2022
3	宝石商リチャード氏の謎鑑定 天使のアクアマリン	The Case Files of Jeweler Richard: The Angel's Aquamarine	November 18, 2016	February 28, 2023
4	宝石商リチャード氏の謎鑑定 導きのラピスラズリ	The Case Files of Jeweler Richard: The Lapis Lazuli of Guidance	February 17, 2017	May 9, 2023
5	宝石商リチャード氏の謎鑑定 祝福のペリドット	The Case Files of Jeweler Richard:: The Peridot of Remembrance	August 22, 2017	August 1, 2023
6	宝石商リチャード氏の謎鑑定 転生のタンザナイト	The Case Files of Jeweler Richard: The Tanzanite of Rebirth	January 19, 2018	January 16, 2024
7	宝石商リチャード氏の謎鑑定 紅宝石（ルビー）の女王と裏切りの海		June 21, 2018	March 5, 2024
8	宝石商リチャード氏の謎鑑定 夏の庭と黄金（ドール）の愛		December 18, 2018	July 16, 2024
9	宝石商リチャード氏の謎鑑定 邂逅の珊瑚（サーンウー）		August 21, 2019	November 19, 2024
	宝石商リチャード氏の謎鑑定公式ファンブック エトランジェの宝石箱		November 26, 2019	
10	宝石商リチャード氏の謎鑑定 久遠の琥珀		June 19, 2020	April 22, 2025
11	宝石商リチャード氏の謎鑑定 輝きのかけら		June 18, 2021	December 30, 2025
12	宝石商リチャード氏の謎鑑定少年と螺鈿箪笥		June 24, 2022	July 28, 2026
13	宝石商リチャード氏の謎鑑定 ガラスの仮面舞踏会		October 19, 2023	
14	宝石商リチャード氏の謎鑑定再開のインコンパラブル		September 19, 2024	
15	宝石商リチャード氏の謎鑑定比翼のマグル・ガル		November 19, 2025	
16	宝石商リチャード氏の謎鑑定エトランジェの宝箱		November 19, 2025	
17	宝石商リチャード氏の謎鑑定エトランジェの宝箱２		October 19, 2026	

=== Manga ===
A manga adaptation illustrated by Mika Akatsuki began serialization in Ichijinsha's Monthly Comic Zero Sum magazine on November 26, 2019. The manga is licensed in English by Seven Seas Entertainment.

No.	Original release date	Original ISBN	English release date	English ISBN
1	March 25, 2020	978-4-75-803498-2	February 15, 2022	978-1-64827-837-2
Case 1 - "Justice of the Pink Sapphire Part 1"; Case 2 - "Justice of the Pink Sapphire Part 2"; Case 3 - "Truth of the Ruby Part 1"; Case 4 - "Truth of the Ruby Part 2"
2	September 25, 2020	978-4-75-803539-2; 978-4-75-803540-8 (SE)	April 12, 2022	978-1-63858-899-3
Case 5 - "Blessings of the Amethyst Part 1"; Case 6 - "Blessings of the Amethyst Part 2"; Case 7 - "Recollection of the Diamond Part 1"; Case 8 - "Recollection of the Diamond Part 2"
3	February 25, 2021	978-4-75-803587-3; 978-4-75-803588-0 (SE)	September 27, 2022	978-1-63858-617-3
Case 9 - "Insight of the Cat's Eye Part 1"; Case 10 - "Insight of the Cat's Eye Part 2"; Case 11 - "Fighting Garnet Part 1"; Case 12 - "Fighting Garnet Part 2"
4	December 25, 2021	978-4-75-803685-6; 978-4-75-803686-3 (SE)	December 6, 2022	978-1-63858-842-9
Case 13 - "Dance of the Emerald Part 1"; Case 14 - "Dance of the Emerald Part 2"; Case 15 - "Dance of the Emerald Part 3"; Case 16 - "Chance Encounter of the Opal Part 1"; Case 17 - "Chance Encounter of the Opal Part 2"; Case 18 - "Chance Encounter of the Opal Part 3"
5	September 24, 2022	978-4-75-803789-1	June 27, 2023	978-1-68579-683-9
Case 19 - "Seeking Topaz Part 1"; Case 20 - "Seeking Topaz Part 2"; Case 21 - "Danger of the Turquoise Part 1"; Case 22 - "Danger of the Turquoise Part 2"
6	March 29, 2024	978-4-75-808491-8	April 8, 2025	979-8-88843-386-7
Case 23 - "The Jade of Succession Part 1"; Case 24 - "The Jade of Succession Part 2"; Case 25 - "The Jade of Succession Part 3"; Case 26 - "An Angel's Aquamarine Part 1"; Case 27 - "An Angel's Aquamarine Part 2"; Case 28 - "An Angel's Aquamarine Part 3"; Extra Case - "The Fluorite by Your Side"
7	July 31, 2026	978-4-82-510050-3		

=== Anime ===
An anime television series adaptation was announced on August 7, 2019. The series is animated by Shuka and directed by Tarou Iwasaki, with Mariko Kunisawa handling series composition, Natsuko Kondou designing the characters, and Nobuko Toda composing the series' music. It premiered from January 9 to March 26, 2020, on AT-X, Tokyo MX, BS11, and Wowow. Nagi Yanagi performed the series' opening theme song "Hōseki no Umareru Toki", while Da-ice performed the series' ending theme song "Only for you." It is streamed by Crunchyroll worldwide, excluding Asia. In Southeast Asia, Muse Communication licensed the series and streamed it on Muse Asia YouTube channel. It ran for 12 episodes.

In addition, 6 volumes of drama CD, taking place after the final episode, were released between May 27 and July 22, 2020.

No.	Title (Note: All English titles are taken from Crunchyroll.)	Original release date
1	"Seigi of the Pink Sapphire"; Transliteration: "Pinku Safaia no Seigi" (Japanese: ピンク・サファイアの正義)	January 9, 2020
Seigi Nakata finds a pink sapphire ring in his grandmother’s house and is warned by her to never do bad things. Years later Seigi saves jewel appraiser Richard Ranasinghe de Vulpian from drunks. With his grandmother dead Seigi hires Richard to appraise the ring. Seigi prevents university classmate Shoko Tanimoto being tricked by a pervert and develops a crush on her. Richard warns Seigi the ring is stolen, although Seigi already knew this. He explains his grandmother had been an unemployed single mother and was forced to steal to support her daughter Hiromi, Seigi’s mother, and stole the ring from a woman who later attempted suicide. Seigi’s grandmother kept the ring to punish herself while Hiromi grew to resent her. Seigi asks Richard to find the original owner so his grandmother can rest in peace. Coincidentally, Richard already knows the owner, Miyashita Tae, who explains it was her engagement ring, but the marriage was purely a business arrangement. When the ring was stolen she was relieved and ended the engagement but was rejected by her family, so she attempted suicide, ended up in hospital and met the doctor who became her husband. Rather than blame her Miyashita is grateful to Seigi’s grandmother and tells him to keep the ring. On Richard's advice, Seigi finally speaks to his mother about his grandmother and learns she helped name him Seigi, meaning Justice. Richard, convinced Seigi is honest and trustworthy, hires him to work part-time at Jewelry Etranger.
2	"The Ruby's Truth"; Transliteration: "Rubī no Shinjitsu" (Japanese: ルビーの真実)	January 16, 2020
New customer Akashi Mami asks Richard to appraise her ruby brooch to see if it has been heat-treated. Seigi comments on the unusually bright colour, which Richard identifies as “Pigeon blood” meaning it was mined in Myanmar and is thus much more valuable. Richard is suspicious of Akashi’s interest in heat-treating as that only concerns the stone's monetary value. Seigi learns from Shoko, who has studied mineralogy, that heat-treating makes rubies 10 times more valuable. Richard is accosted by Homura Takashi, Akashi’s fiance, who believes she is having an affair with Richard. After the mistake is cleared up Homura reveals Akashi is actually called Sasu, and she has recently become miserable. Sasu arrives to collect her brooch but when she sees Homura she gets upset and breaks up with him before fleeing. Seigi follows and she reveals that she is actually a lesbian and had a relationship with a woman named Akashi Tatsuki for 7 years. She only agreed to marry Homura because her family expected it, but the stress of living a lie has made her sick, and she faints. After Homura learns the truth at the hospital he accepts the end of their relationship. Sasu later returns to collect the brooch, which Richard values at 10 million yen, and she decides to return it to Homura while living her life as she wishes.
3	"Insight of the Cat's Eye"; Transliteration: "Kyattsuai no Keigan" (Japanese: キャッツアイの慧眼)	January 23, 2020
Shoko invites Seigi to a mineral show and asks for his number. A young boy, Hajime, brings a gem to the shop Richard identifies as a Chrysoberyl Cat’s Eye, and asks to purchase a second one. Richard fetches several made from Apatite and Tourmaline and explains how cat’s eyes contain Rutile, which creates the pattern. Hajime rejects them for being the wrong colour. Seigi determines Hajime wants them to represent a real cat. Hajime admits he adopted a stray cat named Milk, who saved their lives by predicting future events, but his father inexplicably got rid of him. Hajime’s mother is in hospital with pregnancy complications and his father gave him the cat’s eye to replace Milk’s protection, causing Hajime to seek out another for his mother. Seigi suggests Hajime’s father may not realise how upset Hajime is. Hajime’s father Yasaka arrives, Richard having called him as Yasaka had purchased the first cat’s eye from Richard. Yasaka finally explains that Milk had a parasite called Toxoplasma which is dangerous to pregnant women, so he gave Milk to his secretary, planning to retrieve him after the baby was born. Richard explains that Hajime’s gem is known as a “Honey and Milk” and Yasaka selected it especially for Hajime. Yasaka promises not to keep secrets from Hajime again and they leave satisfied. Seigi is impressed with Richard’s recall of previous customers but is shocked to learn Hajime’s gem is worth 10 million yen.
4	"The Fighting Garnet"; Transliteration: "Tatakau Gānetto" (Japanese: 戦うガーネット)	January 30, 2020
Richard’s new client, Yamamoto, requests a garnet engagement ring. When Seigi finds this odd Richard challenges him to discover why engagement rings use diamonds. Richard shows Yamamoto several garnets, pomegranate, light green and dark green. Richard appears upset at Seigi’s habit of asking questions without thinking. Seigi learns from Shoko that diamonds are popular due to clever marketing from the former diamond mining and trading monopolist. While arranging a trip with Shoko to a geological site Seigi receives a confusing text from Richard. Richard later shows Yamamoto pink rhodolite's, which Seigi comments suit her perfectly, though this upsets her and she laments not being beautiful enough to be compared to a ruby. Yamamoto admits her fiancé dumped her for a younger woman so she decided to buy a ring for herself and garnets are her birthstone. As she seems conflicted Richard tries to dissuade her from making a purchase. Yamamoto leaves but returns later, explaining she just saw her ex fiancé buying his new girlfriend a diamond ring. Richard explains garnets were used for protection by Roman soldiers, and since she has a warrior’s heart, a garnet definitely suits her best. Yamamoto leaves feeling more confident in herself. Based on their interaction with Yamamoto Richard warns Seigi that even compliments can upset people if used carelessly. Yamamoto decides not to buy a garnet but gives Richard a small Pomegranate tree as a thank you.
5	"Opal of Encounters"; Transliteration: "Meguriau Opāru" (Japanese: 巡りあうオパール)	February 6, 2020
Seigi bumps into his old friend, Hase, and tells him the story of his grandmother’s ring. Hase visits Richard's shop, not realising Seigi works there, with a Fire Opal and tells him an altered version of Seigi’s story. Richard knows he is lying so Hase angrily leaves. The next time they meet Hase asks Seigi about “Kainoshi”, of which Seigi is ignorant. A lady named Hata visits the shop, revealing Hase is a nurse who stole the opal from her aunt Hisa, who has dementia. Hase insisted the opal was a gift for saving Hisa from a fire. After Hata leaves Hase returns. Richard refuses to buy the stolen opal so Hase tries to threaten Richard into buying it. Seigi finally confronts him and Hase explains Hisa called the opal “Kainoshi” and Hase planned to sell it to help pay her medical bills. Richard, correctly guessing Hisa has bad teeth, theorises Hisa actually said “Kai-no-Hi”, the story of a rabbit rescuing a skylark and receiving a fire opal as thanks. Hase leaves but later tells Seigi the real truth, he needed money to help his family, but instead he has returned the opal and quit his job. Seigi offers to tell Hata the truth but Hase refuses and apologises for disappointing Seigi. Richard, knowing Seigi would be upset, takes him to dinner and reassures him that it is admirable to be honest all the time.
6	"Perilous Turquoise"; Transliteration: "Ayaui Torukoishi" (Japanese: 危ういトルコ石)	February 13, 2020
Seigi is asked by his friend, Shimomura, to help classmate Iyumi. She shows Richard a charm her boyfriend, Yoshio, gave her before disappearing. Richard correctly guesses Yoshio had asked Iyumi to buy the charm. Richard identifies the stone as Turquoise, representing happiness suggesting Yoshio didn’t want Iyumi to be sad. After Iyumi leaves Richard reveals the turquoise is actually Howlite stained with ink, and Yoshio was a con artist. Seigi notices Richard seems unusually angry. While discussing this with Shoko Seigi almost tells her he likes her. Richard locates the con artists and Yoshio, whose real name is Sasaki. They visit their store, claiming Richard to be Edward Baxter, a master at sensing the aura of gemstones. Richard claims all their gems are cursed, and anyone selling them will experience misfortune. He then confronts Sasaki about selling fakes, causing all the customers to leave. Richard, still in character, subtly suggests to the nervous owner he knows the gems are fake and advises them to change careers, and get exorcisms. As they leave the terrified owner demands salt to exorcise the store. Seigi accuses Richard of being reckless and Richard admits he hates men who use their good looks to sell fakes. The angry customers later expose the con men on social media. Richard flashes back to his youth when he was also a con man calling himself Edward Baxter. He was caught selling a blue zircon, claiming it to be a topaz, by a man named Saul Ranasinghe who recognised his talents.
7	"The Jade of Succession"; Transliteration: "Uketsugu Hisui" (Japanese: 受けつぐ翡翠)	February 20, 2020
Richard is asked by Ito Shobin, an antique dealer, to attend the Azuma Collection auction. The previous owner Azuma Soichi, died, and his daughter decided to sell it so the family couldn’t fight over it. Ito wants the Buddha's hand Citron, a 200 year old jade Qing dynasty necklace, but has been banned from the auction. Seigi notices the Hand is unusually translucent like an emerald, impressing Richard, who explains it is jadeite and expected to fetch 30 million yen. Richard is approached by Shin Ganapati Bertuccio, one of Richard's former competitors, who warns Seigi Richard brings misfortune. When Seigi does not demand details, as he likes Richard too much to make him uncomfortable, Richard decides to tell him the truth. Richard insists Seigi do the bidding, concerning Shin, who eventually crumbles at Richard’s confidence, making Seigi the winning bidder at 45 million. They meet Ito and Hidenori, Azuma’s grandson, who donated an extra 10 million to Ito’s 30 million, while Richard supplied the last 5 million. Hidenori explains he values the Hand because of his precious memories of his grandfather, while Ito and Richard didn’t want to see another Japanese antique sold to a foreign nation. Richard tells Seigi that, like Hidenori, his grandfather left a fortune behind but his family fought over it until they hated each other. As Seigi leaves Richard cryptically asks Seigi not to blame him if he ends up regretting admitting he likes him.
8	"The Angel's Aquamarine"; Transliteration: "Tenshi no Akuamarin" (Japanese: 天使のアクアマリン)	February 27, 2020
Seigi purchases an Aquamarine for Shoko after Richard told him aquamarine is known as an Angel Stone. However, he returns it after learning Shoko is attending a marriage meeting with Homura Takashi, former fiancé of Mami Sasu. Homura explains he has known Shoko for years, and is willing to marry her; but is not romantically interested in her. Seigi has a nightmare about Shoko getting married. He learns she has no romantic experience and believes an arranged marriage would be ideal. Seigi disagrees as his mother divorced his abusive father but had to remarry in order to support them. Seigi decides to support Shoko as she attends further marriage meetings. Richard tells him about a girl who judged him only for who he was and not his appearance, so he fell in love with her, until his grandfather’s inheritance came along and the girl broke up with him so as not to be tempted by money. Seigi realises he would regret not trying and goes to find Shoko. He gives her the aquamarine and tells her even if she does not understand romance yet; she might one day, and urges her to not get married. Shoko explains their earlier conversation had already made her change her mind and she plans to turn down Homura’s proposal. Overhearing this, Homura secretly scolds Seigi for not confessing his feelings at the same time, and then asks why Richard is leaving. Seigi learns from Richard he is closing his shop for a while, but does not explain why, and is seen boarding a plane.
9	"The Alexandrite's Secret"; Transliteration: "Arekisandoraito no Himegoto" (Japanese: アレキサンドライトの秘めごと)	March 5, 2020
Richard's store is reopened by Richard's mentor, Saul Ranasinghe. Seigi explains the situation to Shoko and she suggests he is angry at Richard but is suppressing it. He decides to find Richard so Ranasinghe tells him Richard is in London. He also explains he met Richard in Sri Lanka selling expensive gems to tourists for a pittance, then selling cheap gems for increased prices to unpleasant people. Seigi flies to England and is met by Richard's cousin, Jeffrey Claremont. He explains that his and Richard's grandfather was disowned by their great grandfather for marrying a Sri Lankan woman, but the Claremont title was passed to him anyway when the great grandfather died without another heir. When Richard was in college the great grandfather’s secret will was found along with a £300 million diamond. Normally, Jeffrey’s father would have inherited everything, but the great grandfather's will stated the diamond be inherited by whoever's mother's birthplace was closest to England, and only if they married an Englishwoman. As Richard's mother was French the diamond belongs to Richard, but only if Richard marries an Englishwoman. So far Richard has refused to do anything. Jeffrey asks Seigi to help the family and Seigi realises Jeffrey arranged for Richard’s previous girlfriend to break up with him, despite caring about Richard, as his lapel pin is an alexandrite previously worn by Jeffrey’s older brother, Henry. Henry developed a Psychogenic disease due to shock after the will was found and Jeffrey hopes Richard can help Henry recover by satisfying the terms of the will. Seigi later finds a cryptic note from Richard.
10	"The Lapis Lazuli of Guidance"; Transliteration: "Michibiki no Rapisurazuri" (Japanese: 導きのラピスラズリ)	March 12, 2020
Seigi finds Richard at the Standard of Ur in the British Museum. Seigi suspects Richard’s girlfriend was actually a boyfriend. Richard denies this, explaining he simply refuses to obey the wishes of a hateful man. Henry appears with Jeffrey who tells Seigi the family lawyers deem him an acceptable marriage candidate. Henry begs Seigi to save Richard so Seigi agrees to enter a civil partnership with a furious Richard. Richard is granted the diamond but Seigi tries to grab it and is tackled by security. Richard realises the diamond is actually a white sapphire. The great grandfather's letters found with the sapphire reveal he actually supported his son marrying his Sri Lankan wife, but the family did not, so as revenge the great grandfather told the family he spent millions buying the diamond, bought a sapphire as a ruse and gave the rest of the money to his son. With the diamond issue settled Richard confronts Seigi, who had planned to set Richard free by shattering the diamond and most likely going to prison. Richard scolds him for planning to ruin his own life and they restart their friendship. Jeffrey reveals to Seigi the pudding Richard always asks for used to be made by their governess. Richard later takes some pudding to Jeffrey and Henry and they reconcile. Richard insists Seigi take the sapphire with him to Japan. In return Seigi insists Richard take his grandmother's pink sapphire ring so they will always have a reason to see each other again. Seigi returns to Japan only for Richard to suddenly reappear at the shop.
11	"Peridot of Blessings"; Transliteration: "Shukufuku no Peridotto" (Japanese: 祝福のペリドット)	March 19, 2020
Seigi helps a lady with her shopping and realises she is actually Chieko Inamura, Richard's former governess, who would prefer Richard remain unaware of her presence. However, when Seigi changes his pudding recipe to Inamura’s recipe Richard becomes suspicious. He explains he uses his mother’s name, de Vulpian, because he is searching for Inamura and wants her to recognise his name. Flashbacks show Richard was closer to Inamura than his mother, Catherine, who then framed Inamura for stealing a 19th century peridot necklace that could be split into several separate pieces of jewellery. One piece was used to frame Inamura but the rest were never recovered. Richard manipulates Seigi into visiting Inamura again. She explains Richard's father planned to remarry Catherine and move the family to the Amazon, but Catherine had realised this would upset Richard's life, so she planned the fake theft with Inamura’s help to cause a family argument and end the re-marriage. Inamura took one piece of the necklace and hid the others so Catherine could retrieve them later. Richard's father went to the Amazon alone and Richard stayed with his uncle in England while Inamura returned to Japan. Richard appears at Inamura’s home and they tearfully reconcile after so long apart. Inamura reveals she actually has half of the necklace pieces given by Catherine as a gift. As returning it to the family would cause trouble Richard offers to have the pieces remade into an entirely new piece of jewellery just for her. As Seigi walks home he is approached by his father whom he has not seen in years.
12	"Tanzanite of Rebirth"; Transliteration: "Tensei no Tanzanaito" (Japanese: 転生のタンザナイト)	March 26, 2020
Despite showing no remorse for his abuse Seigi's father, Hisashi, asks Seigi to reconcile. Seigi refuses and runs away. Seigi starts avoiding Richard and his friends as Hisashi begins following him, and even tries to trick Seigi's landlord into giving him Seigi's spare key. Seigi becomes so stressed he has a nightmare about murdering Hisashi and decides to quit his job, but Richard reveals he had Seigi's stepfather, Nakata, look into Hisashi and demands to know why Seigi didn't tell him. Seigi claims it was so Hisashi couldn’t harass anyone he cares about, as Hisashi would happily harass everyone Seigi cares about either until he is bribed to leave, or Seigi moves away where Hisashi can't find him. Seigi also admits he planned to stab Hisashi and is ashamed of himself for acting like Hisashi would. Richard claims he still respects him, and offers to help. Segi sets up a meeting and Richard confronts Hisashi with Nakata, who claims he is more of a father to Seigi than Hisashi ever was. Seigi severs all ties with Hisashi and Richard offers to get the police involved, as he made sure their meeting was right next to a police station, so Hisashi flees. Later, Seigi has his coming-of-age ceremony and is given tanzanite cufflinks Nakata bought from Richard, signifying rebirth, as Seigi comes to terms with being Hisashi's son. Also as a gift Richard offers to teach Seigi English as they prepare to receive Richard's next customer.

== Reception ==
By June 2020, it was announced together with the launch of the 10th novel volume that the total number of copies of the previous 9 volumes had exceeded 700,000.
