= The Yuzuki Family's Four Sons =

Japanese manga series by Shizuki Fujisawa

- First tankōbon volume cover

柚木さんちの四兄弟。 (Yuzuki-san Chi no Yon Kyōdai)
- Genre: Coming-of-age
- Manga
- Written by: Shizuki Fujisawa
- Published by: Shogakukan
- Imprint: Flower Comics
- Magazine: Betsucomi
- Original run: August 10, 2018 – present
- Volumes: 24
- Anime television series
- Directed by: Mitsuru Hongo
- Music by: Yoshikazu Suo
- Studio: Shuka
- Licensed by: Crunchyroll: SA / SEA: Medialink
- Original network: AT-X, Tokyo MX, BS11, HTB, Tochigi TV
- Original run: October 5, 2023 – December 21, 2023
- Episodes: 12
- Television drama
- Directed by: Natsuki Seta; Yōhei Inobe; Kyōhei Tamazawa; Shunji Kikuchi
- Produced by: Tomoyo Kitabayashi
- Written by: Shūko Arai
- Music by: Oh Shu
- Original network: NHK General TV
- Original run: May 28, 2024 – July 18, 2024
- Episodes: 32
- icon

The Yuzuki Family's Four Sons (柚木さんちの四兄弟。, Yuzuki-san Chi no Yon Kyōdai; lit. 'The Four Brothers of the Yuzuki Household') is a Japanese manga series written and illustrated by Shizuki Fujisawa. It has been serialized in Shogakukan's shōjo manga magazine Betsucomi since August 2018, with its chapters collected into 24 tankōbon volumes as of October 2026. An anime television series adaptation produced by Shuka aired from October to December 2023. A television drama adaptation aired from May to July 2024.

The series won the 66th Shogakukan Manga Award in the shōjo category in 2021.

== Characters ==
Hayato Yuzuki (柚木 隼, Yuzuki Hayato)
Voiced by: Ryota Iwasaki
Portrayed by: Taiyu Fujiwara
Mikoto Yuzuki (柚木 尊, Yuzuki Mikoto)
Voiced by: Kikunosuke Toya
Portrayed by: Haruto Ōno
Minato Yuzuki (柚木 湊, Yuzuki Minato)
Voiced by: Miyuki Sakurai
Portrayed by: Haruhi Yamaguchi
Gakuto Yuzuki (柚木 岳, Yuzuki Gakuto)
Voiced by: Momoka Terasawa
Portrayed by: Yahiro Nagase
Uta Kirishima (霧島 宇多, Kirishima Uta)
Voiced by: Misato Matsuoka
Portrayed by: Yuno Izumi
Waka Kirishima (霧島 和歌, Kirishima Waka)
Voiced by: Akari Tadano
Portrayed by: Ruto Nanase
Saki Kirishima (霧島 咲, Kirishima Saki)
Voiced by: M.A.O
Portrayed by: Asami Usuda
Kojirō Kirishima (霧島 虎次郎, Kirishima Kojirō)
Voiced by: Fumihiko Tachiki
Portrayed by: Issey Ogata
Yūma Nikaidō (二階堂 悠真, Nikaidō Yūma)
Voiced by: Satsuki Kokubu

== Media ==
=== Manga ===
Written and illustrated by Shizuki Fujisawa, The Yuzuki Family's Four Sons began serialization in Shogakukan's Betsucomi magazine on August 10, 2018. The first tankōbon volume was published on December 26, 2018. As of October 2026, 24 volumes have been released.

==== Volumes ====
No.	Japanese release date	Japanese ISBN
1	December 26, 2018	978-4-09-870238-1
2	April 26, 2019	978-4-09-870440-8
3	July 26, 2019	978-4-09-870521-4
4	October 25, 2019	978-4-09-870634-1
5	February 26, 2020	978-4-09-870756-0
6	June 26, 2020	978-4-09-870874-1
7	September 25, 2020	978-4-09-871146-8
8	February 25, 2021	978-4-09-871237-3
9	July 26, 2021	978-4-09-871304-2
10	January 26, 2022	978-4-09-871567-1
11	May 26, 2022	978-4-09-871662-3
12	September 26, 2022	978-4-09-871706-4
13	January 26, 2023	978-4-09-871865-8
14	May 25, 2023	978-4-09-872097-2
15	September 26, 2023	978-4-09-872237-2
16	December 26, 2023	978-4-09-872375-1
17	May 24, 2024	978-4-09-872580-9
18	September 26, 2024	978-4-09-872665-3
19	February 26, 2025	978-4-09-872887-9
20	June 26, 2025	978-4-09-873060-5
21	October 24, 2025	978-4-09-873225-8
22	February 26, 2026	978-4-09-873311-8
23	June 26, 2026	978-4-09-873411-5
24	October 26, 2026	978-4-09-873620-1

=== Anime ===
An anime television series adaptation was announced on April 28, 2023. It is produced by Shuka and directed by Mitsuru Hongo, with character designs by Orie Tanaka, who also serves as chief animation director, and music composed by Yoshikazu Suo. The series aired from October 5 to December 21, 2023, on AT-X and other networks. The opening theme song is "Naite Iinda" (泣いていいんだ; "It's Okay to Cry") by Flumpool, and the ending theme song is "Sasakure" (ささくれ; "Splinter") by Aoi Kubo. Crunchyroll licensed the series. Medialink licensed the series in South, Southeast Asia and Oceania (except Australia and New Zealand), and streaming on the Ani-One Asia YouTube channel.

==== Episodes ====
No.	Title	Directed by (Note: Information is taken from the ending credits of each episode.)	Written by	Storyboarded by	Original release date
1	"Yuzuki's House"; Transliteration: "Yuzuki-san Chi" (Japanese: 柚木さんち、)	Mitsuru Hongo	Mitsuru Hongo	Mitsuru Hongo	October 5, 2023
The Yuzuki household consists of the oldest brother, Hayato; the second oldest, Mikoto; the second youngest, Minato; and the youngest, Gakuto. They are having a family breakfast. Minato explains that their parents have passed away, and the four brothers are maintaining the household together. Minato and Gakuto head off to school while the other brothers take care of household chores. Minato mentions that he and Mikoto are close in age and in the same grade, as they are only 11 months apart. After a day at school, the next morning, Minato tries to prepare breakfast but ends up causing more work by burning what he made. Hayato scolds him, and Minato feels upset that Hayato treats him differently from Mikoto, despite the two being technically the same age. Minato notices that Gakuto wants to see the fireworks at a festival, so he resolves to take him there himself, hoping that Hayato will view him as mature for doing this. Minato and Gakuto have a fun time; however, Minato loses sight of Gakuto and must search for him. Although he cannot find Gakuto, Hayato and Mikoto show up and manage to locate him. Hayato goes easy on Minato, understanding that his brother had good intentions. They enjoy watching the fireworks together as a family.
2	"Minato and Mikoto"; Transliteration: "Minato to Mikoto" (Japanese: 湊と尊)	Yoshiki Kawasaki	Yoshiki Kawasaki	Yoshiki Kawasaki	October 12, 2023
Mikoto brings Minato his lunch, and Minato's friend remarks that Minato does not call Mikoto his older brother. Mikoto has a flashback showing that he did not like Minato much during his childhood, as Minato was born premature and received far more attention than him, but Mikoto grew fond of Minato over time.
3	"Something's Bothering Gakuto"; Transliteration: "Gakuto, Komaru" (Japanese: 岳、困る)	Mitsuru Hongo	Mitsuru Hongo	Mitsuru Hongo	October 19, 2023
Gakuto talks about how he also wants to contribute to the household like Minato and Mikoto are now doing. In a flashback, it is shown how the Yuzuki family got in contact with the Kirishima family when their parents passed on. During the flashback, it is revealed that the extended family asked Hayato to at least send Gakuto to other relatives given how young he was, but Hayato absolutely refused and decided to raise Gakuto regardless of how hard it would be. One day, while waiting for his family to come home, Gakuto is invited into the Kirishima household and has apple juice. He notices that the head of the household, Kojiro, treats him in a very mature way, introducing himself and asking him what he wants to watch. After Hayato comes home, Gakuto tells him that he would like to go to the Kirishima household more often after school and says he likes going there. Hayato agrees to this and asks Kojiro if he can impose by having Gakuto come over after class every day, as it would also make his teaching internship easier. Kojiro is delighted and says he would love to.
4	"Hayato's Happiness"; Transliteration: "Hayato no Shiawase" (Japanese: 隼の幸せ)	Yoshiki Kawasaki	Yoshiki Kawasaki	Yoshiki Kawasaki	October 26, 2023
Hayato goes to a high school reunion, where he meets a lot of his former high school classmates and remarks on how mature they look and how relentless the passage of time is. Three girls approach Hayato and flirt with him now that they see he has a stable job and still looks handsome. To everyone's shock, Hayato reveals that he is taking care of his three little brothers. He explains that he spends most of his money on them but enjoys taking care of his family. After the conversation ends, he overhears the three girls talking behind his back about how much like an old man he is and how they lost all interest in him, which upsets him. Walking home from the reunion, he runs into Saki Kirishima, who is on the job as a police officer. She says she is about to finish her shift and asks him to have a drink with her. They discuss what happened at the reunion and she tells him that he should be proud of how well he is raising his family and cheers him up. After he goes home, his brothers surprise him with a birthday party; Hayato had forgotten that it was his birthday and is very excited to celebrate with his brothers.
5	"Uta's Love"; Transliteration: "Uta no Koi" (Japanese: 宇多の恋)	Kaoru Suzuki	Mitsuru Hongo	Mitsuru Hongo	November 2, 2023
A boy approaches Uta and confesses his love to her; she accepts but does not really understand what that entails. Minato's friends note that Minato treats Uta more like another male than someone of the opposite sex. Minato is excited for Uta and happy she got a date; he says that it is amazing and that Uta is like a real adult and one step ahead of him. They hold a strategy meeting to decide what Uta will wear for the date; however, they cannot decide what she should wear, so Gakuto recommends they ask Hayato for advice. After talking to Hayato, Minato decides on what Uta will wear. Minato realizes that now that Uta has a boyfriend, they might not be able to talk as much. He feels upset at the thought and then also happens to catch a cold. After getting over his cold, Minato enlists the help of his brother and friend to break Uta up with her new boyfriend so she will spend all her time with him instead. After he discusses it with his friends, they suggest this approach is not a good idea and that maybe he should try to date Uta instead.
6	"The Outcome of Uta's Love"; Transliteration: "Uta, Koi no Yukue" (Japanese: 宇多、恋の行方)	Yoshiki Kawasaki	Yoshiki Kawasaki	Yoshiki Kawasaki	November 9, 2023
The three boys discuss the situation further, and Minato decides that dating Uta is out of the picture and that he does not want that sort of relationship with her. The next day, Minato tries to spend some time with Uta, but she is not willing to hang out with him. He tries to get closer to her again but is unable to, and he learns from Uta's mom that she probably is not in love and there might be another reason why she seems withdrawn. He eventually meets Uta near their fort, and she explains that the boy she dated said her behavior was very masculine and unfitting and that she should just act like a girl, which hurt her. Minato realizes this is why she has not been herself lately. He tells her that she should just be herself and to ignore someone who does not really like her for who she really is. Uta takes his advice and cries happily to Minato, saying that he really is her best friend, and she breaks up with the boy, as they were not a good fit.
7	"Minato's Encounter"; Transliteration: "Minato, Deau" (Japanese: 湊、出会う)	Mitsuru Hongo	Mitsuru Hongo	Mitsuru Hongo	November 16, 2023
While building their fort, Mikoto talks about how Minato first met Uta. The Yuzuki family met the Kirishima family shortly after their parents died. At first, Uta does not get along with Minato at all, turning down all his attempts to befriend her and generally being very difficult to be around. It is explained that Uta's parents separated and that Uta blamed her mom for the breakup. Minato overhears Saki talking to Hayato about Uta blaming her for the breakup and runs out to confront her. After having a fight, Minato tells Uta she should talk with her mother and should be grateful she has a mother in life. Minato and Uta discuss Minato's reasons for being an uplifting person despite his parents passing away. After she hears him out, they come back home bruised, and Uta asks her mom why she got divorced; her mom explains that Uta's dad was cheating on her. Uta recalls times when she traveled with her father to multiple restaurants with his many female companions. Upset that she knew, her mom punishes Uta with a joint lock. Uta asks Minato to become close friends with her and he accepts. In the present, Mikoto reveals those two have been best buddies since that time. However, he argues that their relationship will never be on par with his companionship with Minato.
8	"Gakuto's Secret"; Transliteration: "Gakuto no Himitsu" (Japanese: 岳の秘密)	Yoshiki Kawasaki	Yoshiki Kawasaki	Yoshiki Kawasaki	November 23, 2023
Gakuto is keeping a secret from his family, which makes his behavior seem a bit strange to the rest of them. Gakuto is hiding a visitation form from his school because he wants to be considerate to Hayato, who will most likely take a day off from work to visit. He tells Waka his secret and Waka says they will not show their mom the form either, because their mom might tell Hayato as well. The head of the Kirishima household hears this plan and proposes to the kids that he go as Waka's grandfather and Gakuto's family friend instead. Gakuto tries his best to keep the secret, but Minato already overheard the conversation, so he is also behaving strangely at dinner. Minato decides its in Gakuto's best interests that some who is family visits the school, so he goes to grab the form from Gakuto's backpack.
9	"Classroom Visitation"; Transliteration: "Jugyō Sankan" (Japanese: 授業参観)	Yoshiki Kawasaki	Yoshiki Kawasaki	Yoshiki Kawasaki	November 30, 2023
Minato tells Uta that he is going to skip school the next day so he can visit Gakuto during the visitation day and asks her to cover for him, which she agrees to. When he is about to leave for the school, Mikoto catches him and asks if he can come along after he realizes the situation. With both of the boys gone, the teachers let Hayato know, and Hayato realizes that he needs to visit Gakuto as well, which leads to the entire family showing up. Gakuto is shocked when he sees this; he reads out loud in class to try and impress his brothers. When they finally get home, Gakuto starts crying because of how many people he caused trouble for by hiding his secret, including Uta, who got scolded by the teachers for covering for Minato skipping school, but everyone assures him that it is okay for him to rely on his older brothers more and they are happy to have been there.
10	"Mikoto and His Little Brothers"; Transliteration: "Mikoto to, Otōto" (Japanese: 尊と、弟)	Kaoru Suzuki	Yoshiki Kawasaki	Yoshiki Kawasaki	December 7, 2023
Mikoto's daily school life is shown, and it is noted that he is admired by most of the student body and that he has a strong love for his younger brother Minato. There is a flashback to when their mother was in the process of giving birth to Gakuto, and Minato starts crying because he wants to see his mother; however, Mikoto calms him down. The brothers discuss their soon-to-be-born brother, and Minato asks Mikoto what having a little brother is like; Mikoto praises brotherhood and says it is the greatest thing. Gakuto is born and Minato is afraid to touch him, but with some encouragement from Mikoto, he eventually does, and he grows really close to Gakuto afterward. Minato spends time feeding Gakuto and playing with him, and they form a good relationship. Mikoto feels a little left out now that he no longer has the full attention of his little brother, but he accepts it, happy to have two adorable little brothers.
11	"Hayato Catches a Cold"; Transliteration: "Hayato, Kaze o Hiku" (Japanese: 隼、風邪をひく)	Mitsuru Hongo	Mitsuru Hongo	Mitsuru Hongo	December 14, 2023
Uta's family is going on a hot springs trip, and the brothers tell Hayato that the Kirishima family is going on a short vacation. Hayato starts sneezing and slowly shows signs that he has a cold. The next morning, breakfast is not ready because Hayato is ill. The brothers make him breakfast and help take care of the household chores, and Minato takes Hayato to the hospital. The brothers go shopping and get dinner. Hayato's fever gets better at first but then gets worse, and he eventually throws up. Eventually, Minato realizes the fever has reached a dangerous threshold, so he calls Saki and asks her for help; she leaves the kids with the Kirishima family head while she drives Hayato to a hospital. While eating dinner at the Kirishima residence, Minato apologizes for disturbing their family while they were on a trip, but they say it is no big deal and he was right to call for help. Hayato recovers from his cold after five days. Saki and Mikoto, however, catch his cold, but it is indicated they will be fine as well.
12	"The Day-to-Day Lives of the Yuzuki Brothers"; Transliteration: "Yon Kyōdai no Ichi Nichi" (Japanese: 四兄弟の一日)	Yoshiki Kawasaki	Yoshiki Kawasaki	Yoshiki Kawasaki	December 21, 2023
Gakuto begins writing in his diary, recording his daily life and notable events; he also explains and analyzes what he has learned each day. He goes around asking his brothers what they think of him and how they feel about their other siblings; he learns some interesting things about how they see him. The brothers go out, dressed in coats and boots due to the rain, and head to the graveyard to leave flowers at their parents' graves. On the way there, Gakuto remembers his parents, and when leaving the flowers, he feels sad at their passing. The rain ends, and Minato points out a rainbow, which lifts Gakuto's spirits. The brothers extend their outing and have a picnic together, then head home, and Gakuto adds the day to his diary as another pleasant day.

=== Drama ===
A television drama adaptation was announced on March 8, 2024. Based on a screenplay by Shūko Arai, the adaptation was directed by Natsuki Seta, Yōhei Inobe, Kyōhei Tamazawa, and Shunji Kikuchi. Tomoyo Kitabayashi served as the producer, while Oh Shu composed the music. The series aired on NHK General TV from May 28 to July 18, 2024.

== Reception ==
In 2021, the series won the 66th Shogakukan Manga Award in the shōjo category.

By May 2023, the series has one million copies in print.
