= The Strongest Magician in the Demon Lord's Army Was a Human =

Japanese light novel series

- First light novel volume cover

魔王軍最強の魔術師は人間だった (Maōgun Saikyō no Majutsushi wa Ningen Datta)
- Genre: Dark fantasy; Isekai
- Novel series
- Written by: Ryousuke Hata
- Published by: Shōsetsuka ni Narō
- Original run: February 22, 2016 – present
- Light novel
- Written by: Ryousuke Hata
- Illustrated by: Kuma
- Published by: Futabasha
- Imprint: Monster Bunko
- Original run: September 30, 2016 – April 27, 2018
- Volumes: 5
- Manga
- Written by: Ryousuke Hata
- Illustrated by: Anajiro
- Published by: Futabasha
- Imprint: Monster Comics
- Magazine: Gaugau Monster
- Original run: July 12, 2019 – June 8, 2025
- Volumes: 13
- Anime television series
- Directed by: Norihiko Nagahama
- Written by: Touko Machida
- Music by: Kohta Yamamoto
- Studio: Studio A-Cat
- Licensed by: Crunchyroll; SA/SEA: Medialink
- Original network: Tokyo MX, BS Asahi, AT-X
- Original run: July 3, 2024 – September 18, 2024
- Episodes: 12
- icon

The Strongest Magician in the Demon Lord's Army Was a Human (Japanese: 魔王軍最強の魔術師は人間だった, Hepburn: Maōgun Saikyō no Majutsushi wa Ningen Datta) is a Japanese light novel written by Ryousuke Hata and illustrated by Kuma. It began serialization online in February 2016 on the user-generated novel publishing website Shōsetsuka ni Narō. It was later acquired by Futabasha, who have published five volumes from September 2016 to April 2018 under their Monster Bunko imprint. A manga adaptation with art by Anajiro was serialized online via Futabasha's Gaugau Monster website from July 2019 to June 2025 and was collected in thirteen tankōbon volumes. An anime television series adaptation produced by Studio A-Cat aired from July to September 2024.

== Premise ==
Ike is one the most powerful generals in the Demon Lord's army, along with their most creative thinker. The secret to his success is that Ike is actually human; getting better result by having humans and demons live together, instead of using oppression. Making his territory the most prosperous of the conquered lands. With demons jealous of his success and bigoted humans out for his head, Ike has his hands full trying to keep his territory from falling into the wrong hands.

In the background, demons and humans with their own agenda attempted to use Ike as a pawn in their plans.

== Characters ==
Ike (アイク, Aiku)
Voiced by: Jun Fukuyama
The adopted grandson of Romberg, he hides his true human self with a hood and mask. He was originally Japanese, but is reincarnated as a human in another world with memories of being Japanese in his past life. At this time, he was raised by a demon named Ron Berg and came to follow him as his grandfather. He is renowned for his incredible magical powers, often taking humans by surprise by being able to use healing magic; demons find compassion a foreign concept and have little understanding of its attribute.
Satie (サティ, Sati)
Voiced by: Hina Tachibana
Satie is Ike's human maid from the town he conquered at the start of the story. She accidentally hid in the office Ike was taking a break in and saw his real face. Ike employed her, since she would not attempt poisoning a fellow human; giving her a safe and secure position. She develops feelings for Ike, which Satie cannot understand at first.
Cefiro (セフィーロ, Sefīro)
Voiced by: Shizuka Itō
Cefiro is a sorceress employed in the Demon army; she knows Ike is human and works to keep his identity secret. Cefiro isn't above shameless fanservice just to upset Ike.
Dairokuten (ダイロクテン)
Voiced by: Manaka Iwami
The Demon Lord, Dairokuten is seeking mostly non-aggressive tactics in the war. She was previously Oda Nobunaga in her past life, making her a brilliant tactician and very observant; realizing Ike is human and entrusting coexistence between humans and Demons to him.
Lilith (リリス, Ririsu)
Voiced by: Azumi Waki
Lilith virgin succubus enamored with Ike who is unaware of his human identity. She views Satie as her rival for master's affection, but Ike has stated he has no romantic interest in Lilith.
Jiron (ジロン)
Voiced by: Kentaro Tone
Alistair (アリステア, Arisutea)
Voiced by: Manatsu Murakami
Alistair is female knight whom Ike defeated during his victory. She was going to be executed under false charges by the nobles, but Ike encouraged her to choose life.
Fiorentina (フィオレンティーナ, Fiorentīna)
Voiced by: Yumi Uchiyama
Romberg (ロンベルク, Ronberuku)
Voiced by: Chō
Romberg was the Demon who adopted Ike. He taught Ike chantless magic and helped design her disguise. Romberg has passed away by the present, but Cefiro was entrusted by Romberg to look after Ike.

== Media ==
=== Light novel ===
Written by Ryousuke Hata, The Strongest Magician in the Demon Lord's Army Was a Human began serialization online on the user-generated novel publishing website Shōsetsuka ni Narō on February 22, 2016. It was later acquired by Futabasha who published five volumes with illustrations by Kuma from September 30, 2016, to April 27, 2018, under their Monster Bunko light novel imprint.

No.	Release date	ISBN
1	September 30, 2016	978-4-575-75104-8
2	February 28, 2017	978-4-575-75125-3
3	June 30, 2017	978-4-575-75144-4
4	November 30, 2017	978-4-575-75174-1
5	April 27, 2018	978-4-575-75203-8

=== Manga ===
A manga adaptation illustrated by Anajiro was serialized on Futabasha's Gaugau Monster manga website from July 12, 2019, to June 8, 2025. The manga's chapters were collected in thirteen tankōbon volumes released from September 30, 2019, to June 13, 2025.

No.	Release date	ISBN
1	September 30, 2019	978-4-575-41078-5
2	February 29, 2020	978-4-575-41103-4
3	August 17, 2020	978-4-575-41145-4
4	December 28, 2020	978-4-575-41192-8
5	June 15, 2021	978-4-575-41255-0
6	December 15, 2021	978-4-575-41337-3
7	June 15, 2022	978-4-575-41440-0
8	December 15, 2022	978-4-575-41554-4
9	June 15, 2023	978-4-575-41675-6
10	January 30, 2024	978-4-575-41815-6
11	June 14, 2024	978-4-575-41907-8
12	December 13, 2024	978-4-575-42040-1
13	June 13, 2025	978-4-575-42172-9

=== Anime ===
An anime television series adaptation was announced in January 2024. It was produced by Studio A-Cat and directed by Norihiko Nagahama, with Touko Machida writing series scripts, Masami Sueoka designing the characters, and Kohta Yamamoto composing the music. The series aired from July 3 to September 18, 2024, on Tokyo MX and BS Asahi. All theme songs are performed by Kohta Yamamoto, with the opening theme song "Ctrl C" featuring Shun Ikegai, and the ending theme song "I Still" featuring Maya Akechi. Crunchyroll streamed the series. Medialink licensed the series in Southeast Asia and Oceania (except Australia and New Zealand) for streaming on Ani-One Asia's YouTube channel.

==== Episodes ====
No.	Title	Directed by	Written by (Note: Credited under the "scenario" label)	Storyboarded by	Original release date (Note: Episodes were released on Abema, Crunchyroll and Ani-One Asia a week before their televised airings)
1	"Ike, Commander of the Undying Brigade"; Transliteration: "Fushiryo Danchō Aiku" (Japanese: 不死旅団長アイク)	Norihiko Nagahama	Touko Machida	Shinichi Tokaibayashi	July 3, 2024
2	"White Rose Knights Commander Alistair"; Transliteration: "Shirobara Kishi Danchō Arisutea" (Japanese: 白薔薇騎士団長アリステア)	Kaoru Yabana	Higurashi Chabo	Kyohei Yamamoto	July 10, 2024
3	"Traitor"; Transliteration: "Uragirimono" (Japanese: 裏切者)	Norihiko Nagahama	Kyouko Katsuji	Kyohei Yamamoto	July 17, 2024
4	"Duel"; Transliteration: "Kettō" (Japanese: 決闘)	Masahiko Suzuki	Takamitsu Kōno	Takashi Iida	July 24, 2024
5	"Ambition"; Transliteration: "Yabō" (Japanese: 野望)	Fumihiro Ueno	Higurashi Chabo	Takashi Iida	July 31, 2024
6	"Dwarf King"; Transliteration: "Dowāfu Ō" (Japanese: ドワーフ王)	Daisuke Kurose	Kyouko Katsuji	Daisuke Kurose	August 7, 2024
7	"War Begins"; Transliteration: "Kaisen" (Japanese: 開戦)	Kaoru Yabana	Takamitsu Kōno	Masayoshi Nishida	August 14, 2024
8	"The Final Battle at Ivalias"; Transliteration: "Kessen Ivariasu" (Japanese: 決戦イヴァリアス)	Kaoru Yabana	Higurashi Chabo	Masayoshi Nishida	August 21, 2024
9	"Negotiations"; Transliteration: "Kōsho" (Japanese: 交渉)	Fumihiro Ueno	Kyouko Katsuji	Takehiro Nakayama	August 28, 2024
10	"Pirates"; Transliteration: "Kaizoku" (Japanese: 海賊)	Norihiko Nagahama	Takamitsu Kōno	Takehiro Nakamura	September 4, 2024
11	"Cefiro Is Defeated"; Transliteration: "Sefīro, Uta Reru" (Japanese: セフィーロ、討たれる)	Kaoru Yabana	Touko Machida	Shinichi Tokaibayashi	September 11, 2024
12	"General E Rudle"; Transliteration: "E・Rudore Shōgun" (Japanese: エ・ルドレ将軍)	Norihiko Nagahama	Touko Machida	Shinichi Tokaibayashi	September 18, 2024
