= Brain's Base =

Japanese animation studio

Brain's Base Co., Ltd.
- Logo used since 2021
- Native name: 有限会社ブレインズ･ベース
- Romanized name: Yūgen-gaisha Bureinzu Bēsu
- Type: Yūgen-gaisha
- Industry: Japanese animation
- Founded: July 1996; 30 years ago
- Founder: Jūkō Ozawa
- Headquarters: Shimorenjaku, Mitaka, Tokyo, Japan
- Number of employees: 62 (as of April 1, 2022)
- Divisions: Digital (Note: Brain's Base Digital (ブレインズ・ベース・デジタル), the studio's 3DCG and compositing department.); Editing Office (Note: Brain's Base Editing Office (ブレインズ・ベース編集室), the studio's editing department.); Painting Department (Note: Brain's Base Painting Department (ブレインズ・ベース仕上部), the studio's coloring and painting department.)
- Website: www.brainsbase.co.jp

Brain's Base Co., Ltd. (Japanese: 有限会社ブレインズ･ベース, Hepburn: Yūgen-gaisha Bureinzu Bēsu) is a Japanese animation studio founded in 1996 by former Tokyo Movie Shinsha staff.

== Works ==
=== Television series ===
Year	Title	Director(s)	Animation producer(s)	Source	Eps.	Refs.
2002	Daigunder	Hiroyuki Yano	Juukou Ozawa; Yoshinaga Minami	Original work	39	
2003–2004	Pluster World (co-animated with Actas)	Yūji Himaki	Seiichi Kikawada; Yoshinaga Minami; Manabu Santou	Original work	52	
2004	New Getter Robo	Jun Kawagoe	Yoshinaga Minami; Tatsuyo Kobayashi ("line producers")	Manga	13	
2005	Kamichu!	Koji Masunari	Yumi Satou	Original work	12	
2005–2006	Gunparade Orchestra	Yutaka Satou (chief); Toshiya Shinohara	Juukou Ozawa; Yoshinaga Minami; Ken Matsumoto	Video game	24	
2006	Innocent Venus	Jun Kawagoe	Juukou Ozawa ("producer")	Original work	12	
2007	Kishin Taisen Gigantic Formula	Keiji Gotoh	Juukou Ozawa ("producer")	Original work	26	
2007	Baccano!	Takahiro Omori	Yumi Satou	Light novel	13	
2008	Kure-nai	Kō Matsuo	Midori Tokiwa	Light novel	12	
2008	Natsume's Book of Friends: First Season	Takahiro Omori	Yumi Satou	Manga	13	
2009	Akikan!	Yūji Himaki	Tatsuyo Kobayashi ("line producer")	Light novel	12	
2009	Natsume's Book of Friends: Second Season	Takahiro Omori	Yumi Satou	Manga	13	
2009	Spice and Wolf II (co-animated with Marvy Jack)	Takeo Takahashi	Tatsuyo Kobayashi; Masayoshi Oono	Manga	12	
2010	Durarara!!	Takahiro Omori	Yumi Satou	Light novel	26	
2010	Princess Jellyfish	Takahiro Omori	Yumi Satou	Manga	11	
2011	Dororon Enma-kun Meeramera	Yoshitomo Yonetani	Seiichi Kikawada	Manga	12	
2011	Natsume's Book of Friends: Third Season	Takahiro Omori	Yumi Satou	Manga	13	
2011	Kamisama Dolls	Seiji Kishi	Seiichi Kikawada	Manga	13	
2011	Penguindrum	Kunihiko Ikuhara; Shouko Nakamura (chief)	Midori Tokiwa	Original work	24	
2012	Natsume's Book of Friends: Fourth Season	Takahiro Omori	Yumi Satou	Manga	13	
2012	Sengoku Collection	Keiji Gotoh	Midori Tokiwa	Mobile game	26	
2012	My Little Monster	Hiro Kaburaki	Yumi Satou	Manga	13	
2012–2013	Ixion Saga DT	Shinji Takamatsu	Tatsuyo Kobayashi; Muneyuki Kanbe	Online game	25	
2013	Amnesia	Yoshimitsu Ohashi	Juukou Ozawa	Visual novel	12	
2013	My Teen Romantic Comedy SNAFU	Ai Yoshimura	Tsutomu Hirano	Light novel	13	
2013	Brothers Conflict	Atsushi Matsumoto	Midori Tokiwa	Novel	12	
2013	Blood Lad	Shigeyuki Miya	Hiromichi Ooishi ("producer")	Manga	10	
2014	D-Frag!	Shizutaka Sugawara	Juukou Ozawa ("producer")	Manga	12	
2014	The Kawai Complex Guide to Manors and Hostel Behavior	Shigeyuki Miya	Emi Yonezawa	Manga	12	
2014	Kamigami no Asobi	Tomoyuki Kawamura	Tsutomu Hirano	Visual novel	12	
2014	One Week Friends	Tarou Iwasaki	Yumi Satou	Manga	12	
2015	Aoharu × Machinegun	Hideaki Nakano	Emi Yonezawa	Manga	12	
2015	Dance with Devils	Ai Yoshimura	Yayoi Saitou	Original work (Collaboration with Rejet)	12	
2015–2017	Rin-ne	Shizutaka Sugawara (s1–s2); Hiroshi Ishiodori (s3)	Juukou Ozawa (s1); Junichi Shimada (s2–s3)	Manga	75	
2016	Endride (co-animated with Lapin Track)	Keiji Gotoh	Juukou Ozawa; Masakazu Watanabe	Multimedia franchise	24	
2016	Servamp (co-animated with Platinum Vision)	Shigeyuki Miya (Note: Credited under the pseudonym Ittou Sara) (chief); Hideaki Nakano	Emi Yonezawa	Manga	12	
2016	Cheer Boys!!	Ai Yoshimura	Yayoi Saitou	Novel	12	
2016	Kiss Him, Not Me	Hiroshi Ishiodori	Junichi Shimada	Manga	12	
2017	Anonymous Noise	Hideya Takahashi	Yayoi Saitou	Manga	12	
2018	School Babysitters	Shūsei Morishita		Manga	12	
2018	Gakuen Basara	Minoru Ohama	Kiyoshi Yamamoto	Video game	12	
2019	Grimms Notes the Animation	Shizutaka Sugawara	Junichi Shimada	Mobile game	12	
2020	In/Spectre	Keiji Gotoh	Juukou Ozawa; Shinji Takada	Light novel	12	
2020–2021	Duel Masters King	Hiroshi Ishiodori	Junichi Shimada; Ryouta Dokura	Manga and Media franchise	47	
2021	To Your Eternity	Masahiko Murata	Juukou Ozawa	Manga	20	
2021–2022	Duel Masters King!	Hiroshi Ishiodori	Junichi Shimada; Ryouta Dokura	Manga and Media franchise	43	
2022	Duel Masters King MAX	Hiroshi Ishiodori; Yūsuke Suzuki	Junichi Shimada; Ryouta Dokura	Manga and Media franchise	17	
2022–2023	Duel Masters Win	Yuusuke Suzuki	Junichi Shimada; Ryouta Dokura	Manga and Media franchise	29	
2022–2023	Golden Kamuy 4th Season	Shizutaka Sugahara	Juukou Ozawa	Manga	13	
2023	In/Spectre 2nd Season	Keiji Gotoh	Juukou Ozawa; Tomoyuki Tateishi	Light novel	12	
2023	Firefighter Daigo: Rescuer in Orange	Masahiko Murata	Suharu Ishizuka	Manga	23	
2024	An Archdemon's Dilemma: How to Love Your Elf Bride	Hiroshi Ishiodori	Juukou Ozawa; Tomoya Urabe	Light novel	12	
2025	Dekin no Mogura	Hiroshi Ishiodori	Juukou Ozawa	Manga	12	
2026	Yowayowa Sensei	Hiroshi Ishiodori	Tomoyuki Tateishi	Manga	12	
2026	Rich Girl Caretaker	Shūsei Morishita	TBA	Light novel	TBA	
2026	The Villager of Level 999	Yoshinobu Kasai	TBA	Light novel	TBA	

=== Original video animations ===
Year	Title	Director(s)	Animation producer(s)	Source	Eps.	Refs.
1998–1999	Change Getter Robo!!: The Last Day of the World (co-animated with Bee Media)	Yasuhiro Imagawa (1–3); Jun Kawagoe (4–13)	Fumikazu Matsumoto; Atsuhiko Sugita	Manga	13	
2000–2001	Shin Getter Robo vs Neo Getter Robo (co-animated with Bee Media)	Jun Kawagoe		Manga	4	
2001–2002	Mazinkaiser	Masahiko Murata		Original work	7	
2005	Super Robot Wars Original Generation: The Animation	Jun Kawagoe		Original work	3	
2006–2007	Demon Prince Enma	Mamoru Kanbe	Tatsuyo Kobayashi; Yoshinaga Minami ("line producers")	Manga	4	
2007–2008	Kimi ga Nozomu Eien ~Next Season~	Hideki Takayama		Eroge visual novel	4	
2009	Denpa teki na Kanojo	Mamoru Kanbe	Seiichi Kikawada	Light novel	2	
2012–2014	Kenichi: The Mightiest Disciple	Hiroshi Ishiodori	Tatsuyo Kobayashi	Manga	11	
2013	Assassination Classroom	Keiji Gotoh	Midori Tokiwa	Manga	1	
2014	Natsume's Book of Friends: Itsuka Yuki no Hi ni	Takahiro Omori	Yumi Satou	Manga	1	
2014	Chō Jikū Robo Meguru (co-animated with Studio A-Cat)	Keiji Gotoh		Original work	1	
2014	The Kawai Complex Guide to Manors and Hostel Behavior: First Time	Shigeyuki Miya	Emi Yonezawa	Manga	1	
2014–2015	Ane Log	Tetsuo Ichimura	Yayoi Saitou	Manga	3	

=== Films ===
Year	Title	Director(s)	Animation producer(s)	Source	Refs.
2000	The Boy Who Saw the Wind	Takahiro Omori	Juukou Ozawa ("producer")	Novel	
2003	Mazinkaiser vs. Shogun of Darkness	Masahiko Murata		Manga	
2011	Hotarubi no Mori e	Takahiro Omori	Yumi Satou	Manga	
2017	Dance with Devils: Fortuna	Ai Yoshimura	Yayoi Saitou	Original work	

== Notable staff ==
=== Representative staff ===
- Juukou Ozawa (founder and president)

=== Animation producers ===
- Tatsuyo Kobayashi (1997~2013)
- Yumi Satou (1997~2014) founded Shuka
- Seiichi Kikawada (2006~2011)
- Midori Tokiwa (2006~2013)
- Tsutomu Hirano (2006~2014)
- Yayoi Saitou (2008~2017)
- Emi Yonezawa (2014~2016) moved to Platinum Vision
- Junichi Shimada (2016~present)
- Tomoyuki Tateishi (2020~present)
- Suharu Ishizuka (2020~present)

=== Production staff ===
- Masakazu Watanabe (2008~2011) co-founder of Lapin Track
- Teruko Utsumi (2010~2016) co-founder of Lapin Track
- Hiromichi Ooishi (2013~2016) founded Platinum Vision

== See also ==
- Shuka – Studio formed by ex-Brain's Base staff and founded by ex-Brain's Base producer Yumi Satou.
- Lapin Track – Studio formed by ex-Brain's Base staff and founded by ex-Brain's Base producer Masakazu Watanabe and screenwriter Teruko Utsumi.
- Platinum Vision – Studio formed by ex-Brain's Base staff and founded by ex-Brain's Base producer Hiromichi Ooishi.
