= Touko Machida =

Japanese anime screenwriter

- 待田堂子
- Born: Aichi Prefecture
- Occupation: Anime screenwriter
- Years active: 2001–present
- Known for: Lucky Star, Show by Rock!!, 7th Time Loop

Touko Machida (Japanese: 待田堂子, Hepburn: Machida Tōko) is a Japanese anime screenwriter. She debuted as a screenwriter in 2001, and in 2006 got to become the lead screenwriter for the first time with Ramen Fighter Miki. Since Ramen Fighter Miki, she has done screenwriting for many works, such as Lucky Star, Show by Rock!!, and Battle Game in 5 Seconds.

== Works ==
=== TV series ===
- Ramen Fighter Miki (2006) (screenwriter)
- Lucky Star (2007) (screenwriter)
- Allison & Lillia (2008) (screenwriter)
- Tears to Tiara (2009) (screenwriter)
- GA Geijutsuka Art Design Class (2009) (screenwriter)
- Ōkami Kakushi (2010) (screenwriter)
- Battle Girls: Time Paradox (2011) (screenwriter)
- The Everyday Tales of a Cat God (2011) (screenwriter)
- The Idolmaster (2011) (screenwriter)
- Amnesia (2013) (screenwriter)
- Karneval (2013) (screenwriter)
- Inari, Konkon, Koi Iroha (2014) (screenwriter)
- Wake Up, Girls! (2014–2015) (screenwriter)
- Chaika: The Coffin Princess (2014) (screenwriter)
- Dramatical Murder (2014) (screenwriter)
- The Disappearance of Nagato Yuki-chan (2015) (screenwriter)
- Show by Rock!! (2015–2021) (screenwriter)
- Endride (2016) (screenwriter)
- Chain Chronicle: Light of Haecceitas (2017) (screenwriter)
- Akashic Records of Bastard Magic Instructor (2017) (screenwriter)
- Dive!! (2017) (screenwriter)
- A Centaur's Life (2017) (screenwriter)
- Happy Sugar Life (2018) (screenwriter)
- Harukana Receive (2018) (screenwriter)
- Are You Lost? (2019) (screenwriter)
- Kemono Michi: Rise Up (2019) (screenwriter)
- Smile Down the Runway (2020) (screenwriter)
- Tamayomi (2020) (screenwriter)
- Maesetsu! (2020) (screenwriter)
- Iwa-Kakeru! Climbing Girls (2020) (screenwriter)
- Life Lessons with Uramichi Oniisan (2021) (screenwriter)
- Battle Game in 5 Seconds (2021) (screenwriter)
- PuraOre! Pride of Orange (2021) (screenwriter)
- My Master Has No Tail (2022) (screenwriter)
- I've Somehow Gotten Stronger When I Improved My Farm-Related Skills (2022) (screenwriter)
- Farming Life in Another World (2023) (screenwriter)
- The Reincarnation of the Strongest Exorcist in Another World (2023) (screenwriter)
- A Playthrough of a Certain Dude's VRMMO Life (2023) (screenwriter)
- 7th Time Loop: The Villainess Enjoys a Carefree Life Married to Her Worst Enemy! (2024) (screenwriter)
- Vampire Dormitory (2024) (screenwriter)
- The Strongest Magician in the Demon Lord's Army Was a Human (2024) (screenwriter)
- Even Given the Worthless "Appraiser" Class, I'm Actually the Strongest (2025) (screenwriter)
- Yaiba: Samurai Legend (2025) (screenwriter)
- With You and the Rain (2025) (screenwriter)
- Shabake (2025) (screenwriter)
- My Friend's Little Sister Has It In for Me! (2025) (screenwriter)
- Reincarnated as the Daughter of the Legendary Hero and the Queen of Spirits (2025) (screenwriter)
- Tojima Wants to Be a Kamen Rider (2025) (screenwriter)
- Wash It All Away (2026) (screenwriter)
- Dark Moon: The Blood Altar (2026) (screenwriter)
- The Oblivious Saint Can't Contain Her Power (2026) (screenwriter)
- Bungo Stray Dogs Wan! 2 (2026) (screenwriter)
- Full Clearing Another World Under a Goddess with Zero Believers (2026) (screenwriter)
- Matsurika Kanriden (2027) (screenwriter)
- The Otome Heroine's Fight for Survival (2027) (screenwriter)

=== Web series ===
- 7 Seeds (2019–2020) (screenwriter)
- SD Gundam World Sangoku Soketsuden (2019–2021) (screenwriter)
- High-Rise Invasion (2021) (screenwriter)
- Pole Princess!! (2023) (screenwriter)
