= Studio A-Cat =

Japanese animation studio

Studio A-Cat Inc.
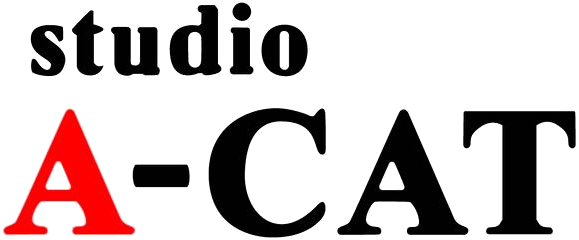
- Native name: 株式会社studio A-CAT
- Romanized name: Kabushiki-gaisha Sutajio A-katto
- Type: Kabushiki gaisha
- Industry: Japanese animation
- Founded: September 1996; 30 years ago
- Headquarters: Shibasakicho, Tachikawa, Tokyo, Japan
- Key people: Kenichirō Sakuno (president)
- Number of employees: 46 (as of July 2019)
- Website: a-cat.co.jp

Studio A-Cat Inc. (Japanese: 株式会社studio A-CAT, Hepburn: Kabushiki-gaisha Sutajio A-katto) is a Japanese animation studio based in Tachikawa, Tokyo.

== Works ==
=== Television series ===
Title	Director(s)	First run start date	First run end date	Eps	Note(s)	Ref.
Transformers: Energon	Yutaka Satō (1-5), Jun Kawagoe (1-13), Takashi Sano (6-51)	January 9, 2004	December 24, 2004	51	Based on Transformers by Hasbro & Takara. Co-produced with Actas	
Frame Arms Girl	Keiichiro Kawaguchi	April 3, 2017	June 19, 2017	12	Based on a model kit line by Kotobukiya. Co-produced with Zexcs.	
Taisho Mebiusline Chicchaisan	Shuu Watanabe	October 6, 2017	December 22, 2017	12	Based on the Taishou Mebiusline BL visual novel by HolicWorks.	
Pastel Life	Tommy Hino	May 16, 2018	June 21, 2018	6	Spin-off of BanG Dream!.	
Over Drive Girl 1/6	Keitaro Motonaga	April 6, 2019	June 22, 2019	12	Adaptation of the manga series by Öyster.	
Tamayomi	Toshinori Fukushima	April 1, 2020	June 17, 2020	12	Adaptation of the manga series by Mountain Pukuichi.	
LBX Girls	Keitaro Motonaga	January 7, 2021	March 25, 2021	12	Spin-off of Little Battlers Experience.	
Getter Robo Arc	Jun Kawagoe	July 4, 2021	September 26, 2021	13	Adaptation of the manga series by Ken Ishikawa. Co-produced with Bee Media.	
Battle Game in 5 Seconds	Meigo Naito (Chief); Nobuyoshi Arai	July 13, 2021	September 28, 2021	12	Adaptation of the manga series by Saizō Harawata. Co-produced with SynergySP and Vega Entertainment. Involved in CG Animation Production.	
She Professed Herself Pupil of the Wise Man	Keitaro Motonaga	January 12, 2022	March 30, 2022	12	Adaptation of the light novel series by Hirotsugu Ryusen.	
I've Somehow Gotten Stronger When I Improved My Farm-Related Skills	Norihiko Nagahama	October 1, 2022	December 17, 2022	12	Adaptation of the light novel series by Shobonnu.	
Highspeed Etoile	Keitaro Motonaga	April 6, 2024	June 22, 2024	12	Original work.	
The Strongest Magician in the Demon Lord's Army Was a Human	Norihiko Nagahama	July 3, 2024	September 18, 2024	12	Adaptation of the light novel series by Ryousuke Hata.	
The Beginning After the End	Keitaro Motonaga	April 2, 2025	June 18, 2025	12	Adaptation of the web novel series by TurtleMe.	
Hero Without a Class: Who Even Needs Skills?!	Kaoru Yabana	October 1, 2025	December 17, 2025	12	Adaptation of the light novel series by Shichio Kuzu.	
The Beginning After the End (season 2)	Keitaro Motonaga	April 1, 2026	June 24, 2026	12	Sequel to The Beginning After the End.	
Reborn as a Space Mercenary: I Woke Up Piloting the Strongest Starship!	Norihiko Nagahama	October 4, 2026	TBA	TBA	Adaptation of the light novel series by Ryūto.	

=== Films ===
Title	Director(s)	Release date	Note(s)	Ref.
Frame Arms Girl: Kyakkyau Fufu na Wonderland	Keiichiro Kawaguchi	June 29, 2019	Compilation of Frame Arms Girl. Co-produced with Zexcs.	

=== Original video animation ===
Title	Director(s)	Release date	Note(s)	Ref.
Chō Jikū Robo Meguru	Keiji Gotoh	November 2014	Original work. Co-produced with Brain's Base.	

=== Video games ===
Title	Director(s)	Release date	Note(s)	Ref.
Mega Man ZX	Hideto Ueda	July 2006	Contributed with the animated cutscenes.	
