= Battle Game in 5 Seconds =

Japanese manga series

- Manga volume 1 cover

出会って5秒でバトル (Deatte Go-byō de Batoru)
- Genre: Action
- Manga
- Written by: Saizō Harawata
- Illustrated by: Kashiwa Miyako
- Published by: Shogakukan
- English publisher: NA: Comikey (digital)
- Magazine: MangaONE; Ura Sunday
- Original run: August 11, 2015 – present
- Volumes: 31
- Anime television series
- Directed by: Meigo Naito (chief); Nobuyoshi Arai
- Written by: Touko Machida
- Music by: Ryo Hayakawa
- Studio: SynergySP (Note: Animation Production (アニメーション制作)); Vega Entertainment; Studio A-Cat (Note: CG Animation Production (CGアニメーション制作))
- Licensed by: Crunchyroll; SA/SEA: Muse Communication
- Original network: Tokyo MX, BS11
- Original run: July 13, 2021 – September 28, 2021
- Episodes: 12
- icon

Battle Game in 5 Seconds (Japanese: 出会って5秒でバトル, Hepburn: Deatte Go-byō de Batoru), also known as Battle in 5 Seconds After Meeting, is a Japanese manga series written by Saizō Harawata and illustrated by Kashiwa Miyako. It has been serialized in Shogakukan's MangaONE app and Ura Sunday website since August 2015. It is a remake of Harawata's webcomic by the same name. An anime television series adaptation by SynergySP and Vega Entertainment (with CG animation by Studio A-Cat) aired from July to September 2021.

== Plot ==
Akira Shiroyanagi, a 16-year-old high school student with excellent grades and a hobby of playing games, is bored with his normal daily life. He was attacked by a mysterious bandage man who suddenly appeared there, and succeeded in repelling it like a game, but was killed by a magician-like woman who appeared afterwards. Kei wakes up in a mysterious hospital-like facility, and the magician-like woman, Metsune, appears in a venue where only people in similar circumstances are gathered. It is explained that each of them fights using the "ability" given to them. After the 1st program of one-on-one battles, the 2nd program of 1-on-1 battles in groups of 5, and the 3rd program of team battles, the stage shifts to the 4th program, in which 6 groups of 12 people, including one observer, compete.

== Characters ==
=== Main characters ===
Akira Shiroyanagi (白柳 啓, Shiroyanagi Akira)
Voiced by: Ayumu Murase (Japanese); Robbie Daymond (English)
A 16-year-old sophomore who does excellent academically, but likes gaming instead because it is "unpredictable". His ability is called "Sophist", an ability that allows him to use any ability which the other person (opponent or partner) believes he has. He is somehow labeled as "My Prince" by Mion.
Yūri Amagake (天翔 優利, Amagake Yūri)
Voiced by: Aimi (Japanese); Laura Stahl (English)
A 17-year-old high school girl who hates the word "coincidence" because she thinks that all the things that happen coincidentally lead to an unfortunate life. Her ability is called "Demon God" which allows her to multiply her physical ability by five times. She has feelings for Akira.
Madoka Kirisaki (霧崎 円, Kirisaki Madoka)
Voiced by: Kazuya Nakai (Japanese); Billy Kametz (English)
A delinquent. His ability is to turn any stick into a sword that can cut through anything, including the effects of other abilities.
Shin Kumagiri (熊切 真, Kumagiri Shin)
Voiced by: Yūichi Nakamura (Japanese); Bill Butts (English)
A wrestler. His ability is to become invincible for two seconds; this is shown visually as a suit of armour.
Rin Kashii (香椎 鈴, Kashii Rin)
Voiced by: Toa Yukinari (Japanese); Kennady Ray (English)
A seductive and manipulative office lady who has the ability to create torture devices from body fluids such as blood, sweat, and saliva.
Ringo Tatara (多々良 りんご, Tatara Ringo)
Voiced by: Miyuri Shimabukuro (Japanese); Xanthe Huynh (English)
A petite figured girl whose ability is "Plagiarist", which allows her to copy someone else's ability with about 1/10 of its real power.

=== Other characters ===
Mion (魅音, Mion)
Voiced by: Mayumi Shintani (Japanese); Lisa Ortiz (English)
A catgirl who is a cruel sadist, she is interested in seeing people slaughtering each other for her own sake of fun. She is one of the Observers.
Yang (ヤン, Yan)
Voiced by: Akari Kitō (Japanese); Erica Schroeder (English)
Mion's follower, dressed in Chinese style.

== Media ==
=== Manga ===
Created by Saizō Harawata, Battle Game in 5 Seconds was first launched as a webcomic, and a remake illustrated by Kashiwa Miyako began publishing on Shogakukan's MangaONE app and Ura Sunday website on August 11 and August 18, 2015, respectively. In October 2024, Miyako announced that the manga would enter on hiatus due to health and personal issues since the start of the year, stating as well that the series is approaching its end. The series resumed on January 9, 2025. Shogakukan has collected its chapters into individual tankōbon volumes. The first volume was released on February 26, 2016. As of July 10, 2026, 31 volumes have been released.

Comikey is digitally publishing the manga in English since July 12, 2021.

==== Volumes ====
No.	Japanese release date	Japanese ISBN
1	February 26, 2016	978-4-09-127028-3
2	June 17, 2016	978-4-09-127308-6
3	October 19, 2016	978-4-09-127384-0
4	March 17, 2017	978-4-09-127549-3
5	July 19, 2017	978-4-09-127656-8
6	December 12, 2017	978-4-09-128047-3
7	March 19, 2018	978-4-09-128219-4
8	July 19, 2018	978-4-09-128426-6
9	October 19, 2018	978-4-09-128637-6
10	February 19, 2019	978-4-09-128754-0
11	June 12, 2019	978-4-09-129231-5
12	October 11, 2019	978-4-09-129416-6
13	February 19, 2020	978-4-09-129588-0
14	June 18, 2020	978-4-09-850112-0
15	November 19, 2020	978-4-09-850334-6
16	March 18, 2021	978-4-09-850481-7
17	July 12, 2021	978-4-09-850620-0
18	October 12, 2021	978-4-09-850765-8
19	March 18, 2022	978-4-09-851031-3
20	July 19, 2022	978-4-09-851198-3
21	November 17, 2022	978-4-09-851409-0
22	April 12, 2023	978-4-09-852003-9
23	September 19, 2023	978-4-09-852548-5
24	February 9, 2024	978-4-09-853123-3
25	June 11, 2024	978-4-09-853386-2
26	October 10, 2024	978-4-09-853645-0
27	February 12, 2025	978-4-09-853862-1
28	July 11, 2025	978-4-09-854177-5
29	November 12, 2025	978-4-09-854305-2
30	March 12, 2026	978-4-09-854477-6
31	July 10, 2026	978-4-09-854693-0

=== Anime ===
In November 2020, it was announced that the manga would receive an anime television series adaptation. The series is animated by SynergySP and Vega Entertainment and directed by Nobuyoshi Arai with Meigo Naito serving as chief director, Touko Machida handling series composition, Studio A-Cat producing the CG animation, and Tomokatsu Nagasaku and Ikuo Yamamoto handling character designs. It aired from July 13 to September 28, 2021, on Tokyo MX and BS11. The opening theme song, "No Continue," is performed by Akari Kitō, while the ending theme song, "Makeibe Jikkyō Play" (負けイベ実況プレイ; lit. "Let's Stream a Playthrough of the Bad Ending"), is performed by 15-sai to Seiko Oomori. Crunchyroll streamed the series outside of Asia. Muse Communication licensed the series in South and Southeast Asia.

==== Episodes ====
No.	Title	Directed by (Note: Information is taken from the ending credits of each episode.)	Written by	Storyboarded by	Original release date
1	"Sophist"; Transliteration: "Kiben-ka" (Japanese: 詭弁家)	Kenta Kumada	Tōko Machida	Nobuyoshi Arai	July 13, 2021
Akira Shiroyanagi, a high school student who enjoys playing games, is bored with daily activities. One day, while on the way to school, he is suddenly attacked by a mysterious man. Although he repels with his judgment, he is mercilessly killed by the magician-style woman, Mion, who appears immediately afterwards. When he wakes up, Akira is gathered in a mysterious facility. He is told that Mion will participate in the program as an experimental monitor of "ability", and he will be involved in a harsh ability battle. Then, Akira decides, "I will play this game completely."
2	"Demon God"; Transliteration: "Kijin" (Japanese: 鬼神)	Yukiyo Teramoto	Tōko Machida	Yukiyo Teramoto	July 20, 2021
Yūri Amagake, an unhappy high school girl who hates the word "accidental", is one among the people gathered in a mysterious organization like Akira. One day, Yūri dies as she tries to help a man on the building's roof on the verge of throwing himself. Her first program is a 1 v 1 duel. Yūri, confused by the unexpected behavior of her opponent, is forced to fight against her, but she vows to clear the game to return to the girl she lived with.
3	"Trueblade"; Transliteration: "Shinken-shi" (Japanese: 真剣師)	Ken'ichi Nishida	Chabō Higurashi	Kyōhei Yamamoto; Meigo Naitō	July 27, 2021
The second program is a 5 v 5 team competition. As each other reveals his abilities, Akira disguises his own abilities as "the ability to make a hand cannon." Opposing enemy teams include a bewitching beauty lady, Rin Kashii, and a withdrawn high school girl, Ringo Tatara. Madoka Kirisaki appears with full satisfaction in an important battle that decides the outcome of the victory or defeat.
4	"Plagiarist"; Transliteration: "Hiniku-ya" (Japanese: 皮肉屋)	Kenta Noda	Chabō Higurashi	Kenta Noda; Meigo Naitō	August 3, 2021
Madoka Kirisaki, who appeared in the middle of a 5 v 5 team battle that could lose his life, fights well with his "ability to turn a tree branch into a sword that can cut anything", but it was reversed due to his carelessness. Akira, who appeared next, calmly verifies his abilities through the battle and deepens his understanding. In the final round, where the team won or lost, Yūri will confront her stalker who makes the kick to participate in this game.
5	"Hunter"; Transliteration: "Karyūdo" (Japanese: 狩人)	Yukiyo Teramoto	Tōko Machida	Yukiyo Teramoto	August 10, 2021
The third program has started. At the same time as the start, a man named Katsuya Saito who speaks Kansai dialect saying "I came to solicit you" appears in front of Akira. According to Katsuya, there are multiple factions in the third program, the "red team" is divided by dangerous people and they belong to the "green team". Akira, who seeks a clue to clear the program, visits the position of the green team and meets the team leader, Yūto Shirasagi.
6	"Mediator"; Transliteration: "Chōtei-nin" (Japanese: 調停人)	Danzō Katō	Tōko Machida	Takashi Iida; Meigo Naitō	August 17, 2021
Akira, who decides to stay on the green team, gives an advantage to his true ability in preparation for the upcoming battle. Announcing a large-scale subjugation quest from Mion, who enters and participates in the quest, the leaders of the red team, Hajime Oogami and Masaya Kuroiwa, visit the reconnaissance of the green team. Masaya takes cruel measures against Yūto Shirasagi and the others who are trying to leave the place to hide their abilities.
7	"Tyrant"; Transliteration: "Bōkun" (Japanese: 暴君)	Yūichi Satō	Chabō Higurashi	Meigo Naitō	August 24, 2021
A large-scale quest "King of Hunting" is announced by the charming sound. Enlightenment who gets a momentary peace until the next quest where the red team and the green team will survive each other. As each other prepares for the upcoming battle, a "person" who notices Akira's "real ability" begins to move.
8	"Guardian"; Transliteration: "Goei-kan" (Japanese: 護衛官)	Yoshinobu Kasai	Chabō Higurashi	Meigo Naitō	August 31, 2021
Akira, who is preparing to win the quest, contacts the leader of the blue team, Iori Omoto, and asks for cooperation. When the time is full and the "King of Hunting" begins, the King Hajime Oogami unexpectedly appears on the front line and dominates the battlefield with overwhelming violence.
9	"Iron Maiden"; Transliteration: "Tetsu no Shojo" (Japanese: 鉄の処女)	Motoki Nakanishi	Tōko Machida; Meigo Naitō	Meigo Naitō	September 7, 2021
With the advent of Hajime Oogami, the front line expands at once and the battle ends are opened in various places. Yūri engages with Hajime Okami to save Asuka Kiryū, who is in trouble. Akira and Madoka confront Ryuji, an executive of the red team. While red team and green team are fighting for death, Suzu and Koika, who were on the same team, were prepared to get rid of each other during the war.
10	"Diamondhand"; Transliteration: "Kongōshu" (Japanese: 金剛手)	Shigeki Awai	Tōko Machida; Meigo Naitō	Meigo Naitō	September 14, 2021
By strenuous battle, he played a good match with the red team executives and the battle situation changed to the green team's predominance. The traitor who was lurking in the green team finally starts to move in the critical situation where the victory and defeat of both teams took place. Meanwhile, Akira was trying to capture Masaya Kuroiwa, the deputy leader of the red team, in its range.
11	"Loanshark"; Transliteration: "Kōrigashi" (Japanese: 高利貸し)	Ryūji Motoyama	Tōko Machida; Meigo Naitō	Meigo Naitō	September 21, 2021
Akira is forced to fight with Masaya Kuroiwa's ability. While each other's advanced tactics are flying around, it is the one who looks ahead and wins. On the other hand, Yūri, Madoka and Shin Kumagiri, fighting to defeat Hajime Okami, lose the way to do it in front of the overwhelming power of Hajime Oogami who suddenly changed.
12	"The Final Ability"; Transliteration: "Saigo no Nōryoku" (Japanese: 最後の能力)	Yūichi Satō	Tōko Machida; Meigo Naitō	Meigo Naitō	September 28, 2021
Overcoming more sacrifices, "King of Hunting" has reached the final stage. In order to clear the third program and return to the girls who have similar circumstances, each of them stands up with all their might to fulfill their inner feelings. What is the future ahead of the battle?

== Reception ==
As of November 2020, the manga had 2 million copies in circulation.

Battle Game in 5 Seconds was nominated for the 67th Shogakukan Manga Award in the shōnen category in 2021.
