= The Beginning After the End =

American web novel series and its adaptations

- Webtoon cover of The Beginning After the End volume 1 featuring young Arthur Leywin

끝이 아닌 시작 RR: Kkeuchi anin sijak MR: Kkŭch'i anin sijak
- Genre: High fantasy
- Author: TurtleMe
- Illustrator: Fuyuki23
- Publisher: Tapas (digital); Yen Press (print)
- Original run: July 7, 2018 – present
- Volumes: 11
- Anime television series
- Directed by: Keitaro Motonaga
- Written by: Takamitsu Kōno
- Music by: Keiji Inai
- Studio: Studio A-Cat
- Licensed by: Crunchyroll
- Original network: Fuji TV (+Ultra), AT-X
- Original run: April 2, 2025 – June 24, 2026
- Episodes: 24

The Beginning After the End is an American web novel series written by TurtleMe and illustrated by Fuyuki23. It began serialization on Tapas in January 2017. A webtoon adaptation, also illustrated by Fuyuki23, began serialization on Tapas in July 2018. Yen Press is publishing the webtoon in English; as of August 2026, eleven volumes have been released. An anime television series adaptation produced by Studio A-Cat aired from April to June 2025, while the second season aired from April to June 2026.

== Premise ==
It follows the life of the late King Grey after his untimely and mysterious death. Reborn as Arthur Leywin, he seeks to correct his past mistakes in the vibrant new continent of Dicathen, a world of magic and fantastical creatures. Equipped with the knowledge of a powerful king at the age of 38, Arthur navigates his new life as the magic-wielding child of two retired adventurers and gains purpose through each of his new experiences—something he lacked in his previous life. When a kind dragon sacrifices her life to protect him, Arthur resolves to live a sincere, kind, and courageous life with those he loves. With the help of a lost elf princess and the Elven Kingdom of Elenoir, Arthur begins his long journey to find his true place in the world.

As the years pass, Arthur becomes more and more comfortable in this world, positioning himself as a young, but respected figure. However, deja-vu strikes as a war brews between Dicathen and the Vritra, a clan of banished deities now ruling over a faraway continent. Arthur must rise as a leader, despite his fear of becoming the war-hardened monster he once was in his past life. As the war rages on, Arthur discovers that he was not reborn to this world by chance...nor was he the only one.

== Characters ==
=== Leywin family ===
Arthur Leywin / King Grey
Voiced by: Natsumi Fujiwara (Arthur), Makoto Furukawa (King Grey) (Japanese); Amber May (Arthur), Christopher Wehkamp (King Grey) (English)
Reynolds Leywin
Voiced by: Yamato Kinjo (Japanese); Jessie James Grelle (English)
Alice Leywin
Voiced by: Rena Maeda (Japanese); Colleen Clinkenbeard (English)
Eleanor Leywin
Voiced by: (Japanese); Gillian Lange (English)
Sylvie
Voiced by: (Japanese); Kayla Temshiv (English)

=== Twin Horns ===
Jasmine Flamesworth
Voiced by: Chiaki Omigawa
Durden Walker
Voiced by: Shinya Takahashi
Adam Krensh
Voiced by: Taihi Kimura (Japanese); Nick Huber (English)
Angela Rose
Voiced by: Riko Akechi
Helen Shard
Voiced by: Miyū Ogura

=== Indrath Clan ===
Sylvia Indrath
Voiced by: Shiori Izawa (Japanese); Lydia Mackay (English)

=== House Helstea ===
Tabitha Helstea
Voiced by: (Japanese); Brianna Roberts (English)
Lilia Helstea
Voiced by: (Japanese); Lisette Monique Diaz (English)

=== House Eralith ===
Tessia Eralith / Cecilia
Voiced by: Kana Ichinose (Japanese); Abigail Blythe (English)

=== House Glayder ===
Curtis Glayder
Voiced by: (Japanese); Robin Clayton (English)
Kathyln Glayder
Voiced by: (Japanese); Emi Lo (English)

== Media ==
=== Novel ===
Written by South Korean-American writer Brandon Lee, better known as TurtleMe, and illustrated by Fuyuki23, the web novel began serialization on Tapas on January 18, 2017.

==== Volumes ====
No.	Title	English release date	English ISBN
1	Early Years	May 5, 2017	978-1-370-61060-0
2	New Heights	May 5, 2017	978-1-370-67379-7
3	Beckoning Fates	May 5, 2017	978-1-370-80253-1
4	Horizon's Edge	May 5, 2017	978-1-370-50490-9
5	Convergence	October 12, 2019	978-0-463-66099-7
6	Transcendence	October 12, 2019	978-0-463-21157-1
7	Divergence	February 15, 2020	978-1-370-67993-5
8	Ascension	March 29, 2021	978-1-005-48418-7
8.5	Amongst the Fallen	January 1, 2023	—
9	Reckoning	June 16, 2022	978-1-005-62569-6
10	Retribution	July 5, 2023	979-8-215-04126-0
11	Providence	November 8, 2024	979-8-227-53977-9
12	Apotheosis	May 19, 2026	—

=== Webtoon ===
A webtoon adaptation of the web novel, also illustrated by Fuyuki23, began serialization on Tapas on July 7, 2018. Fuyuki23 ceased illustrating the webtoon in June 2023. An executive of Kakao Entertainment, Tapas' parent company, said the webtoon adaptation was specifically created for the North American market. At New York Comic Con 2021, Yen Press announced that they would be publishing the webtoon in print. As of August 2026, eleven print volumes have been released.

==== Seasons ====
Season	Episodes	Premiere date	Finale date
1	25	July 7, 2018	April 20, 2019
2	37	July 31, 2019	March 20, 2020
3	23	May 29, 2020	November 27, 2020
4	40	January 1, 2021	October 15, 2021
5	50	December 31, 2022	January 24, 2023
Jasmine: Wind-Borne (side story)	10	November 4, 2023	December 30, 2023
6	40	May 11, 2024	July 3, 2025
7	TBA	March 12, 2026	TBA
Overall	229	—N/a	—N/a

==== Volumes ====
No.	English release date	English ISBN
1	August 2, 2022	978-1-9753-4563-1
2	February 28, 2023	978-1-9753-4564-8
3	July 18, 2023	978-1-9753-7308-5
4	November 21, 2023	978-1-9753-7309-2
5	April 23, 2024	978-1-9753-7310-8
6	August 20, 2024	978-1-9753-7311-5
7	March 25, 2025	979-8-8554-1343-4
8	July 22, 2025	979-8-8554-1344-1
9	November 25, 2025	979-8-8554-1345-8
10	February 24, 2026	979-8-8554-1346-5
11	August 25, 2026	979-8-8554-1347-2
12	December 15, 2026	979-8-8554-1348-9

=== Anime ===
An anime television series adaptation was announced at New York Comic Con on October 19, 2024. It is produced by Studio A-Cat and directed by Keitaro Motonaga, with Takamitsu Kōno writing series scripts, Masami Sueoka designing the characters, and Keiji Inai composing the music. The series aired from April 2 to June 18, 2025, on Fuji TV's +Ultra programming block. (Note: Fuji TV listed the series premiere on April 2, 2025, at 24:45, which is effectively April 3 at 12:45 a.m. JST, though AT-X has the earliest release on April 2.) The opening theme song is "Kingsblood", performed by Kala, while the ending theme song is "Mahiru no Tsuki" (真昼の月; Midday Moon), performed by Seiza. Crunchyroll streamed the series. An English dub was produced concurrently, which premiered on April 16 of the same year.

The first season was initially planned to air in two cours with a total of 24 episodes. However, after the broadcast of Episode 11, Crunchyroll announced that the season would conclude with Episode 12, with the second season airing from April 2 to June 24, 2026 on the same programming block. The opening theme song is "Sayonara Janai Hō ga Ii" (さよならじゃない方がいい; It Would Be Better If We Don't Have to Say Goodbye) performed by Six Lounge, while the ending theme song is "Futatsu no Michi" (二つの道; Two Roads) performed by 22/7.

==== Episodes ====
===== Season 1 =====
No.	Title	Directed by (Note: Production staff information is taken from the ending credits of each episode.)	Written by	Storyboard by	Original release date
1	"The Rebirth of the King"; Transliteration: "Ōsama, Umare Kawaru." (Japanese: 王様、生まれ変わる。)	Keitaro Motonaga	Takamitsu Kono	Goichi Iwahata & Keitaro Motonaga	April 2, 2025
Grey, the most powerful and bloodthirsty king in the world, dies suddenly in his late-30's of no apparent cause. Floating in the abyss, a voice urges him to seek out the light. He suddenly awakens in an alternate world as newborn Arthur Leywin, first son of retired adventurers Reynolds and Alice. At first he is furious to be reduced to a helpless infant, but he soon discovers humans in this world use an unfamiliar power called magic. Determined to protect himself by gaining as much power as possible, Arthur takes any opportunity he can to learn, reading his parents' books in secret. He discovers his new home is the continent of Dicathen which contains three kingdoms: Sapin, the nation of the humans; Darv the underground nation of the Dwarves; and Elenoir, the forest nation of the Elves. Having been a master of Ki in his old world, Arthur practices magic at every opportunity and casts his first spell at only two years old, injuring Reynolds and destroying their house. Having never experienced family in his former life, he is confused at the feelings of guilt and realizes he has learned to love his parents, crying for the first time in either of his two lives.
2	"The King, Under Attack"; Transliteration: "Ōsama, Osowareru." (Japanese: 王様、襲われる。)	Honami Inamura	Takamitsu Kono	Takashi Iida	April 9, 2025
Arthur recalls when an emissary from another nation attempted to assassinate him, so he executed the man’s family to spare them years of torture, and the emissary thanked him. Reynolds begins teaching Arthur the sword and is astounded Arthur is already a skilled swordsman. Realizing he and Alice aren’t capable of training Arthur, they move to Xyros City to find him an instructor. For the journey, they hire their old party Twin Horns as bodyguards. Arthur learns Alice is an especially rare Emitter mage who can use healing magic. Adam, Twin Horn’s spearman, decides to test Arthur’s abilities, which Arthur loses as he is unfamiliar fighting with such a small body. Jasmine, Twin Horn’s scout, notices Arthur use Ki on his legs to increase his speed. After teaching her how, she gifts him a knife. They are attacked by bandits seeking Alice. Reynolds reveals Alice is pregnant. A bandit mage attacks and Arthur is thrown from a cliff, but uses Jasmine’s knife to drag the mage with him to protect Alice and his future sibling. As he falls, he realizes he understands why the emissary thanked him, feeling he can die happy knowing Alice will survive. Arthur awakens in the forest at the bottom of the cliff and is confronted by a terrible monster that greets him by name.
3	"Meeting The King"; Transliteration: "Ōsama, Deau." (Japanese: 王様、出会う。)	Keitaro Motonaga	Takamitsu Kono	Bob Shirahata	April 16, 2025
The monster, named Sylvia, claims to be Arthur’s ally and helps him recover. Afterwards, she shows Arthur he has been unconscious for days and his parents were forced to continue their journey without him. More time passes, and while Arthur wants to leave, the forest is full of monsters, and Sylvia cannot leave her cave. Sylvia shows Arthur it is possible to use magic whilst absorbing more from the environment at the same time, allowing spells to be cast indefinitely. However, she refuses to teach him while evil lives within his heart. Eventually, Arthur realizes he cannot repeat his former life of hatred and violence and swears to protect others. Meanwhile, another monster identical to Sylvia searches for her. After much effort, Arthur learns Sylvia’s ability. The second monster locates Sylvia, who quickly hides Arthur. Sylvia reveals her true form as a white dragon and temporarily freezes time. She reminds Arthur of his promise to help others and gives him a magic crystal, one of her feathers, and a tattoo similar to her own body markings. After an emotional goodbye where Arthur acknowledges her as his adoptive grandmother, she uses the last of her magic to teleport Arthur as close to his parents as she can, unfreezes time and attacks the other monster with an explosion that collapses the cave. Arthur awakens alone in the forest and begins his journey to survive until he finds his parents.
4	"Saved by the King"; Transliteration: "Ōsama, Tasukeru." (Japanese: 王様、助ける。)	Shunji Yoshida	Satoko Sekine	Takashi Iida	April 23, 2025
Almost immediately, Arthur witnesses slavers transporting a young elf girl. He takes down three slavers in ambush attacks, but their leader turns out to be a mage whom Arthur eventually kills after a difficult magical duel. For a moment, the girl reminds him of a woman he once knew. Arthur tries to send the girl to her home of Elenoir, but realizes she is too young to travel on her own, forcing him to try to lead her there himself. He learns she is Tessia Eralith, and that she wants to train as a mage when she is old enough. Arthur realizes one of the slaver's pet wolves is following them, so he makes sure to stay on guard. The trip starts to annoy him since it is preventing him looking for his parents. He also begins to struggle with terrible pains from his mana core. During one such episode that leaves him immobile with pain, the wolf suddenly appears with food for them before leaving again. Arthur is confused but Tessia is sure it is thanking them for setting it free. They eventually reach a teleportation portal Tessia recognizes as a gateway to Elenoir and quickly pulls him inside. Before Arthur can do anything, he is grabbed by elven soldiers while the suddenly uncaring Tessia watches.
5	"The King's Test"; Transliteration: "Ōsama, Tamesareru." (Japanese: 王様、試される。)	Norihiko Nagahama	Ayumi Sekine	Takashi Iida	April 30, 2025
Tessia suddenly asks the soldiers to stop, but they plan to execute him. They are stopped by Tessia's grandfather Virion, the retired elven king, causing Arthur to realize Tessia is a princess. Her parents, King Alduin and Queen Merial, demand Arthur be arrested, but Tessia simply shouts at them until they relent. Arthur remains confused why Tessia showed such hostility towards him when they first arrived. At the castle, he explains being separated from his parents and rescuing Tessia from the slavers, though he does not mention Sylvia. Arthur asks to be returned to Sapin, though Alduin explains the only portal to Sapin can't be opened for another five years, so after some more pressure from Tessia, he agrees to have guards escort Arthur on foot. Arthur begins to doubt his parents would even want him back. Tessia snaps him out of his sudden depression and he realizes he was being foolish. Virion appears and requests a duel as he is interested in how Arthur defeated the slavers alone. Arthur wins so Virion stubbornly requests a second duel, until Tessia scolds him for bullying. Virion offers to make Arthur his apprentice, as he has determined the pain in Arthur's mana core comes from having acquired the Will of a Beast, and if he doesn't train to use it he will die.
6	"The King's Training"; Transliteration: "Ōsama, Shugyō Suru." (Japanese: 王様、修行する。)	Shunji Yoshida	Touko Machida	Takehiro Nakayama	May 7, 2025
In his dreams, Arthur experiences the pain from his core as a shadowy monster. Virion decides to take Arthur to visit his old friend. He also warns Arthur that as heir to the throne, Tessia has often been manipulated by people pretending to be her friend, so Arthur must be very special to her if she trusts him. Virion's friend is the elven sorceress Rinia Darcassan, a Diviner who can sense both the past and the future. With her help, Arthur is able to send a psychic message to his thrilled parents telling them he is alright and will join them in Xyros once his illness is cured. Determined to see them again, Arthur agrees to become Virion's apprentice. Tessia insists on showing Arthur around Elenoir, but are confronted by several children Tessia knows, including Feyrith Ivsaar, one of the fake friends Virion mentioned. Angry Tessia prefers Arthur over him, Feyrith challenges Arthur to a duel. Since refusing would dishonor Virion, Arthur accepts and knocks Feyrith unconscious with one punch. The next day, Arthur starts his Beast Tamer training with Virion, determined to master everything Virion can teach him. Three years later, Arthur and Tessia have grown and become more powerful with their abilities.
7	"The King Says Goodbye"; Transliteration: "Ōsama, Owakare Suru." (Japanese: 王様、お別れする。)	Keitaro Motonaga	Sekine Satoko	Bob Shirahata	May 14, 2025
Virion reveals Arthur cannot use sorcery as the Beast Will disrupts the balance between his body and his core. After three years of training, Virion decides it is time to awaken the Beast Will, allowing Arthur to tame animals. However, awakening Beast Will causes an explosion of magic and Arthur is forced to admit his Beast Will came from a dragon. Virion reveals Arthur should be able to leave Elenoir as the Sapin portal is being opened 2 years early for a massive cultural exchange between the elves, dwarves and humans. That night, the crystal Arthur got from Sylvia hatches an infant black dragon which accepts him as her father. Arthur names her Sylvie. Virion deduces awakening his Beast Will caused Sylvie to hatch. Arthur encounters Feyrith for the first time since their duel. It transpires Feyrith actually wanted to be Arthur's friend. Tessia is sad many children like Feyrith are taking part in the cultural exchange, but she cannot go due to security risks. Virion gives Arthur a compass with the Elenoir Royal Seal, allowing him to visit Elenoir whenever he wants. Tessia almost misses her chance to say goodbye before Arthur departs. Arthur reaches Xyros, the flying city built on a floating island, and heads for his parents' new home where he meets his little sister Eleanor.
8	"Reunited with the King"; Transliteration: "Ōsama, Saikai Suru." (Japanese: 王様、再会する。)	Norihiko Nagahama	Touko Machida	Takashi Iida	May 21, 2025
Arthur relates the story of his absence to his thrilled parents, except for Sylvia whom he keeps secret. Reynolds, who now works security at an auction house, is curious about Arthur’s power, which is almost equal to his at such a young age. They are visited by Reynolds’ boss Vincent Halstea, his wife Tabitha and daughter Lilia. Vincent is astounded by Arthur’s power, which easily surpasses the 12 year old students from the Xyros Magic Academy. Reynolds requests a practice duel using his fire magic but Arthur fights him to a stalemate using advanced fire magic and water magic. As it is exceedingly rare to control more than one element, Vincent suggests Arthur be enrolled at Xyros Academy, even offering to pay the fees himself and ensure he be accepted despite only being 8 years old. Lilia introduces Arthur to the servants, who reveal Lilia often worries about her future, since her parents are desperately hoping she will awaken a mana core and become a successful mage. The next morning, Arthur is visited by Twin Horns who are all glad to see him, especially Jasmine, who regrets she couldn’t stop Arthur falling off the cliff. Seeing them makes Arthur curious about the adventurer life, which would allow him to visit the other kingdoms.
9	"The King Teaches"; Transliteration: "Ōsama, Oshieru." (Japanese: 王様、教える。)	Honami Inamura	Ayumi Sekine	Honami Inamura	May 28, 2025
While shopping, Arthur feels a presence from a store selling extracted beast cores. Lilia has long desired one as they sometimes contain Beast Wills, but her parents consider this cheating when she should be focused on awakening her own core. Lilia sneaks away to another store to secretly buy a cheap core. Arthur tries to dissuade her in case it doesn’t work, and their argument disturbs boys from the Academy. A fight almost occurs, but the boys leave after realizing Lilia is Vincent’s daughter, a financial donor to the Academy. Vincent assures Arthur the fight won’t affect his entry to the Academy. Lilia becomes upset, feeling Vincent is only sending Arthur as a substitute for her, since she can’t use magic. Later, she apologizes to Arthur for her jealousy. Deciding to help, Arthur pretends to have sent Lilia to Elenoir for training. At first, Vincent and Tabitha are furious, but soon realize they pressured Lilia unfairly. Lilia reveals she never actually left; she just wanted them to understand. Vincent apologises and promises to support Lilia in whatever future she chooses. Lilia decides for herself to attend the academy so Arthur uses Virion’s technique to forcibly awaken the dormant cores in both Lilia and Eleanor. Vincent throws a party to celebrate. Meanwhile, a sinister man takes an interest in Vincent’s auction house.
10	"The King's Defiance"; Transliteration: "Ōsama, Sakarau." (Japanese: 王様、逆らう。)	Shunji Yoshida	Satoko Sekine	Takashi Iida	June 4, 2025
Vincent hosts an auction attended by King Blaine, who purchases a World Lion cub for his son Prince Curtis to be his mana beast partner. Sebastien, the King's magician, selfishly demands Arthur give him Sylvie to serve as his partner. When Arthur refuses, Sebastien threatens his family, angering Arthur until his bloodlust damages the entire building. Unaware it was Arthur, Blaine assumes it was a magical assassin and punishes Reynolds for his poor security. Sebastien suggests surrendering Sylvie as an appropriate punishment but Arthur refuses, standing up to Blaine directly. Blaine's knights seize Arthur, but he defeats them. He then freezes time except for Sebastien, and after breaking his leg, he terrifies him with his beast core, which takes the shape of Sylvia. The next day, Blaine sends a messenger to apologize and assures that the knights have been fired, as has Sebastien, who was rambling about Arthur breaking his leg despite being across the room. Blaine also sends gold as a bribe, implying he could still punish Reynolds if the bribe is refused. Reynolds lets Arthur have the gold for his future. Arthur however, is displeased with how it ended and decides to attend the Academy and learn how to utilize Sylvie as his partner. There, he meets a mysterious woman.
11	"The King’s Decision."; Transliteration: "Ōsama, Ketsui Suru." (Japanese: 王様、決意する。)	Goichi Iwahata & Keitaro Motonaga	Touko Machida	Keitaro Motonaga	June 11, 2025
The woman, Director Goodsky, duels Arthur and wins but senses his potential. Arthur agrees to learn from her if she extends protections to his family. He also defers his enrolment until he is the appropriate age, planning to spend three years as an adventurer first. Alice agrees as long as he comes home every few months while Reynolds insists he have an experienced adventurer supporting him, which Jasmine volunteers for. Arthur goes to buy a sword from Vincent, but is disappointed by the options. Sylvie locates a heavy iron staff that turns out to be a sword that can only be drawn when infused with magic. The sword, inscribed with Dawn’s Ballad W.K IV., magically shrinks until it is the ideal size for his hand. Believing the sword to be a magic artefact, Arthur purchases a much cheaper sword for appearances sake and, since Vincent believes it is just a cheap iron staff, receives the magic sword for free as a disposable practice weapon. Weeks later on his ninth birthday, Arthur receives a healing magic glove from Alice, as well as a ring that will warn Alice if he is in mortal danger, and a single use scroll for sending an emergency message. His preparations complete, he says goodbye to his parents and departs with Jasmine.
12	"The King’s Departure."; Transliteration: "Ōsama, Tabidatsu." (Japanese: 王様、旅立つ。)	Keitaro Motonaga	Ayumi Sekine	Goichi Iwahata	June 18, 2025
Jasmine takes Arthur to the adventurer's guild to obtain a license from Guildmaster Kaspian Bladeheart, who informs Jasmine her father has been looking for her. Arthur chooses to register under the alias Note. During the exam, Arthur witnesses an arrogant young half-elf named Lucas attempt a cowardly sneak attack on the examiner, which Arthur prevents, and Lucas is only granted a B-rank. Kaspian administers Arthur's exam himself and deems him to be B-rank as well. Guild officials are suspicious so many children are registering and attaining B-rank straight away. Kaspian is not surprised since the recent cultural exchange resulted in guilds lifting the ban on elves and dwarves. Lucas' mother was an elf slave while his father was her owner Lord Wykes, who desired a sorcerer son. Also of note was Elijah Knight, a human raised by dwarf parents. Jasmine takes Arthur for training in a low danger area but while there, an escaped boar monster goes on a rampage. Arthur's past self suddenly warns him to be patient and wait for the right moment, which Arthur does, resulting in him slaying the boar. Jasmine reveals she became an adventurer to escape her family, the Flamesworths, most of whom rejected her anyway when she turned out not to have the family's trademark fire magic. Meanwhile, Tessia watches Arthur through a crystal ball and is upset to see him with yet another woman. Two years later, Arthur has become famous as Note the Masked Swordsman.

===== Season 2 =====
No.	Title	Directed by	Written by	Storyboard by	Original release date
1	"The King Begins Adventuring"; Transliteration: "Ōsama, Bōken Suru." (Japanese: 王様、冒険する。)	Keitaro Motonaga	Takamitsu Kono	Goichi Iwahata	April 1, 2026
Arthur and Jasmine investigate a village near Beast Glades that no one has been able to contact. Sylvie decides to patrol nearby. They discover the villagers frozen in crystal by an Arachne spider monster, forcing them to escape. Mysterious people watch the Beast Glade, plotting to manipulate events against the Tri-Kingdom alliance of humans, elves and dwarves. Jasmine explains Arachne are among the strongest of monsters, and killing one once took all of Twin Horns working together, in particular Alice with her Emitter powers. The Arachne freezes Jasmine, forcing Arthur to fight. As the Arachne is magic resistant and covered in armour plates, Arthur cracks the skull with earth magic and sends lightning and fire inside its body before beheading it. He judges that he still has a long way to go before attaining the strength he had in his previous life. Jasmine scolds him for risking his life to save hers. Sylvie eats the Arachne’s mana core. The villagers are grateful Arthur rescued them. Lucas doubts Arthur actually defeated an Arachne, until Arthur shows the severed head as proof. His parents scold him for being reckless but praise his achievement. Arthur remains determined to grow stronger. He also wonder what Tessia has been up to lately.
2	"The Princess Begins Adventuring"; Transliteration: "Ōjosama, Bōken Suru." (Japanese: 王女様、冒険する。)	Shunji Yoshida	Takamitsu Kono	Takashi Iida	April 8, 2026
Tessia begins working as an adventurer with Feyrith and Vio to strengthen inter-species cooperation following the Tri-Kingdom Alliance, but as the war only ended recently they are often attacked by angry humans and dwarves. Arthur encounters Lucas and Elijah again. Tessia and her friends struggle to complete a boar-monster hunt as the human villager’s aren’t willing to accept help from elves. The mysterious people, who sent the boar, plan to have Tessia die in human territory to provoking conflict between elves and humans. Tessia finds two curious human children who tell her the boar’s location. Tessia uses a technique Arthur taught her to absorb mana from the environment and kills the boar. The mysterious people are disappointed and decide to try kill Tessia again. The human villagers refuse to thank them for slaying the boar, but Tessia is content she made the two children happy. Watching Tessia through a crystal, Virion and Goodsky are impressed and hope Tessia and Arthur will one day change the world. As Tessia and Feyrith are Xyrus Academy students Vio decides to visit it with them to see Arthur. Tessia is furious, having been unaware Vio knew Arthur, whereas Tessia has not seen him since he left Elenoir. Tessia travels to Arthur’s house but is so nervous she runs away when startled by Alice and Eleanor.
3	"The King is Stranded"; Transliteration: "Ōsama, Sōnan Suru." (Japanese: 王様、遭難する。)	Norihiko Nagahama	Takamitsu Kono	Bob Shirahata	April 15, 2026
After being caught in the same storm, Arthur finds himself trapped on an island with Elijah and Lucas. Elsewhere, Jasmine worries their quest was sabotaged, as according to Reynolds a mysterious group has been causing trouble for adventurers. Lucas reveals he was hunting a Salamander that probably caused the storm that sank their boats. Lucas attacks the salamander but finds it is even larger than described in the quest description, and it has healing magic. He, Arthur and Elijah work together, but due to its healing magic they fail to kill it. Arthur realises Lucas reminds him of his teenage self from his first life. Jasmine appears and severs the salamander's head. Sylvie eats the salamander's mana core, angering Lucas and Elijah as they needed it as proof the quest was completed. Feyrith and Vio tease Tessia that she is too scared of seeing Arthur again to look for him properly. Angry, Tessia visits his home again but this time runs away after being startled by Reynolds. The mysterious group are pleased their overpowered monsters are taking out an adequate number of adventurers, but still desire to find an even more powerful monster for an important task.
4	"The King's Homecoming"; Transliteration: "Ōsama, Kikyō Suru." (Japanese: 王様、帰郷する。)	Norihiko Nagahama	Takamitsu Kono	Takashi Iida	April 22, 2026
Jasmine is asked to join a treasure hunt quest with Brald, an AA rank adventurer. Arthur does not like Brald being around Jasmine. Reynolds is confused why Brald would hire other adventurers when he already has a party, but discovers the party are not taking part in the quest with Brald. Arthur agrees to spend time with his family and wonders if he will ever get used to it. Shiun, a servant of Lucas’ father, asks Lucas to join Brald and discover what he is up to. Lucas agrees, despite the quest not being guild approved, and Shiun is shown to have sinister motives. Feyrith and Vio start to worry about Tessia the longer she goes without seeing Arthur. Arthur considers buying a dimensional storage ring but is put off by the prices. Sylvie reveals she is craving mana cores, but due to the recent deaths of adventurers the guild has begun restricting new quests. Arthur and Jasmine join Brald to discover what he is hiding. Sylvie decides not to go with them as she doesn’t like the feel of the dungeon they will be exploring. One of the mysterious people regrets he doesn’t have full control of his newest mana beast but decides it doesn’t matter as it is his final mission.
5	"The King's Struggles"; Transliteration: "Ōsama, Funtō Suru." (Japanese: 王様、奮闘する。)	Keitaro Motonaga	Touko Machida	Goichi Iwahata	April 29, 2026
Arthur meets the other adventurers; Reginald and Kriol, two A Rank Augmenters, and Oliver and Samantha, two A Rank Emitters. Brald explains they are looking for an enormous mana stone in the Tomb of Terror dungeon. He also warns them the monsters are immortal, so avoiding combat is vital. Brald is confused as the dungeon does not match the map given him by the mysterious client who hired him to find the stone. Due to the unexpected danger, Oliver tries to abandon the group but is hit by a steam eruption that kills him. A giant worm attacks them, but due to its immortality they only manage to scare it away. Lucas starts to panic and can't put up his barrier, so Brald loses his sword hand to another eruption. Furious at his own cowardice, Lucas lashes out at everyone but is convinced by Arthur to calm down. Brald is forced to admit he didn't scout the dungeon first as he trusted the client, making everyone furious. As losing a hand will end his career, Brald asks that they find the stone so at least his final quest will be successful. He also nominates Arthur as replacement party leader.
6	"The King Gets Serious"; Transliteration: "Ōsama, Honki Dasu." (Japanese: 王様、本気出す。)	Keitaro Motonaga	Kyoko Katsuya	Goichi Iwahata	May 6, 2026
On the lowest floor Arthur realises a magical mist is manipulating their desires. Kriol sees his deceased wife and disappears trying to reach her. Note wakes everyone else and Jasmine clears the mist with wind magic, revealing the floor is covered in carnivorous vines trying to grab them. Brald goes mad from the illusions. As the vines keep regenerating after being burned, Samantha uses water magic to dry the roots until they can’t regenerate. The roots track back to an S class mana beast, an Elder Woods Guardian, that has absorbed Kriol. Jasmine urges Arthur to run, believing they can’t save the others, but Arthur refuses. Realising they need magic hotter than fire, Arthur switches to lightning magic, but even this does not work. Lucas goes mad from fear and self-loathing, believing he has a destiny as a great mage, so he attacks everyone in the hope their deaths will allow him to escape. Brald is impaled and absorbed by the Guardian. With no other choice, Arthur activates Virion’s technique and freezes the Guardian down to its roots, killing it. Without the Guardian, the whole floor starts to collapse. Alice’s ring warns her Arthur is in mortal danger. The mysterious man doubts Arthur is an ordinary A rank Augmenter.
7	"The King Survives"; Transliteration: "Ōsama, Seikan Suru." (Japanese: 王様、生還する。)	Honami Inamura	Kyoko Katsuya	Honami Inamura	May 13, 2026
Lucas makes it to the surface and claims everyone died. In the dungeon Arthur heals his own injuries and Jasmine’s. Elijah swears revenge on Lucas. He also reveals he might be either a dwarf or a human, as he was raised by dwarves but never met his parents. His father figure, Elder Rahdeas, sent him away when he manifested an unusual magic. Arthur admits about his Beast Will and his ability to augment all four elements plus lightning and ice. Leaving the shelter they find Reginald, Kriol and Brald dead and Samantha badly injured. They attempt to return to the surface but come close to death. They are suddenly rescued by Sylvie, grown into a mature dragon from eating dozens of mana cores hunting wild monsters. They reach the surface in minutes, where Samantha reveals she managed to save the beast core of the Elder Guardian, which she insists Arthur take. Arthur sends a magical message to let his family know he is alive. They are retrieved by the Guild and sent to hospital, but the Guild Master informs them Lucas lodged an official complaint against Arthur for the quest failure and the deaths of Brald, Oliver, Reginald and Kriol, so the Guild must hold a trial.
8	"The King's Day in Court"; Transliteration: "Ōsama Shuttei Suru." (Japanese: 王様、出廷する。)	Honami Inamura	Touko Machida	Bob Shirahata	May 20, 2026
Lucas testifies Arthur used him, Brald, Reginald and Kriol as decoys so he could escape with Jasmine. Lucas sends men to attack Elijah so he can't testify, but Arthur saves him, with only Kaspian preventing Arthur killing Lucas. Kaspian warns Arthur not to make things worse, since while nobody knows Arthur is Note, everybody knows Jasmine, and if anything happens to Lucas his family will target Jasmine and everyone she cares about, which includes Arthur's family. The trial finds Lucas lied, so he is banned from adventuring. Lucas doesn't care as he is entering the Academy and will not be adventuring anyway. Arthur is outraged when the judge deems him a threat to Lucas and bans him from attending the academy. Lucas is likewise outraged Arthur is not forced to reveal his identity under his Note mask. In private, Arthur is satisfied the judge followed his instructions in not letting him attend the Academy, since Lucas will lower his guard in the belief Note is not a student. Kaspian is also revealed as Arthur's ally. As Lucas has seen her with Note, Sylvie disguises herself as a white cat. With his reward money, Arthur buys a more powerful storage ring. He returns home and learns Jasmine returned to working with Twin Horns and Lilia has already joined the Academy. Arthur gives the Guardian's core to Reynolds to increase his power.
9	"The King's Gratitude"; Transliteration: "Ōsama, Kansha Suru." (Japanese: 王様、感謝する。)	Shunji Yoshida	Takamitsu Kono	Takashi Iida	May 27, 2026
Elijah meets Arthur's parents and starts to understand how Arthur is so strong. Arthur buys Elijah all the supplies he needs to attend the academy. Lucas continues to demand Note's real identity, but Kaspian reminds him due to the Three Kingdom Alliance the guild now has international responsibilities and is enforcing the rules even more strictly, plus, Lucas is no longer an adventurer and has right to demand anything from a guild employee. The mysterious man infiltrates the guild and finds nothing useful on Note, but he finds Jasmine's records. Jasmine visits to explain she and Twin Horns are leaving for a quest and won't return for a long time, so she asks Arthur to fight her. After an intense duel, showcasing their growth as warriors and new skills in magic, Arthur decides not to use Beast Will. Instead, he shows her he has mastered all the skills she taught him to survive a fight, letting her know he will be alright when she leaves. Arthur eventually wins the duel. Before Jasmine leaves, Arthur gives her the new storage ring he bought. Arthur finds himself sad to have lost Lucas as a friend, but must move forward now as his enemy.
10	"The King Negotiates"; Transliteration: "Ōsama, Kōshō Suru." (Japanese: 王様、交渉する。)	Keitaro Motonaga	Touko Machida	Keitaro Motonaga	June 3, 2026
For Eleanor's birthday gift, Arthur asks to meet Gideon, an inventor Vincent is acquainted with. Reynold reveals he levelled up thanks to the Beast Core, but it didn't crumble after being used. Arthur realises the core contains the Beast Will of the Guardian. As Beast Wills are element based, he and Reynolds are the wrong element to absorb it, but it would be perfect for Tessia. Royalty from Sapin, Elenoir and Darv schedule a joint public announcement. Arthur meets Gideon who is trying to invent a manner of going on long sea voyages for Sapin's King. Arthur offers to teach him to build a steam engine. Gideon is so excited he offers to pay with two Phoenix pendants, that allow the wearer to survive a fatal blow twice. Arthur negotiates for the pendants and the reason behind the long sea voyage. Gideon admits another continent has been discovered, as an unknown mana-beast equipped with a camera was caught spying on all three kingdoms, so it is assumed the new continent contains mages. While shopping for Eleanor's gift Elijah stops human academy students assaulting a dwarf student. Arthur beats their leader, who attacks Arthur with water magic, but the spell is stopped by a young woman.
11	"The King Celebrates"; Transliteration: "Ōsama, Oiwai Suru." (Japanese: 王様、お祝いする。)	Keitaro Motonaga & Xin Kuo	Kyoko Katsuya	Takehiro Nakayama	June 10, 2026
The woman is Princess Kathlyn, daughter of King Blaine. Kathlyn is surprised when Arthur openly accuses the others of bullying and lying. The leader reveals he is Jamiel Trident, a noble heir. Prince Curtis decides to let them go, but Arthur magically contacts Director Goodsky and demands they be expelled or he will not enrol at Xyrus. Jamiel is astounded when Goodsky expels him, while Curtis is shocked when Kathlyn takes an interest in Arthur. The three kingdoms publicly announce the new continent. They also announce the end of the conflict between their species with the creation of the Six Lances who will represent peace between the kingdoms, consisting of two humans, two elves, and two dwarves. Arthur notes one of the chosen humans is Bairon, Lucas' brother, and deduces it is him who will retaliate if he fights Lucas again. At Eleanor's birthday, Gideon informs Arthur that his steam engine was approved by the three kingdoms. He also suspects that Arthur has a wealth of world changing ideas at his disposal, but Arthur refuses to give him more for the societal conflict they could cause; he does agree to help Gideon with his own ideas. Eleanor receives an elvish bow from someone anonymous, though Arthur suspects Tessia. Arthur gives the Phoenix pendants to Eleanor and Alice as gifts, while a spy watches the party.
12	"The King Enrolls"; Transliteration: "Ōsama, Nyūgaku Suru." (Japanese: 王様、入学する。)	Keitaro Motonaga	Takamitsu Kono	Goichi Iwahata	June 17, 2026
Lured to a deserted church, Arthur meets the mysterious man, who reveals he knows Arthur is Note. He admits he sent Brald to the dungeon and demands to know how Arthur defeated the Elder Guardian. Realising the man caused the deaths of dozens of adventurers, Arthur attacks. The man defeats Arthur, repeating his demand of how Arthur defeated the Guardian. Arthur severs his hand, with the man realising Arthur was holding back earlier to trick him. The man admits he is creating a spell to control S class mana beasts. To protect his identity, the man takes a potion that turns him into a mana beast. He attacks the city, and Arthur finds his skin too tough to pierce. Knocked unconscious, Arthur sees a vision of Sylvia, who reminds him of his promise to protect others. He awakens, defeats the beast and executes the man. With his Note mask broken, Arthur leaves to avoid being seen. A robed woman retrieves the man and temporarily revives him. The man reports Arthur contains the beast will from something surpassing S Class, a true dragon. The woman executes him. A short time later Arthur and Elijah attend the Xyrus opening ceremony. Arthur reunites with Tessia, who is already a member of the student council.

== Reception ==
Mel Lake of Multiversity Comics praised the main character's journey, particularly its psychological aspects. Lake also praised the artwork, particularly its fight scenes, backgrounds, and faces. Vanessa Piña of Screen Rant compared the series to Solo Leveling, while also describing its aesthetic and storytelling as "distinct".

Alex Trent of Game Rant reported that 40,000 fans have signed a petition demanding the anime series be remade due to disappointment with the animation quality of the series.
