= The Kawai Complex Guide to Manors and Hostel Behavior =

Japanese manga series

- Cover of Bokura wa Minna Kawai-sō volume 1 published by Shōnen Gahōsha. The character on the cover is Ritsu Kawai.

僕らはみんな河合荘 (Bokura wa Minna Kawaisou)
- Genre: Romantic comedy, slice of life
- Manga
- Written by: Ruri Miyahara
- Published by: Shōnen Gahōsha
- Imprint: Young King Comics
- Magazine: Young King OURs
- Original run: April 30, 2010 – December 28, 2017
- Volumes: 11
- Anime television series
- Directed by: Shigeyuki Miya
- Written by: Takeshi Konuta
- Music by: Akito Matsuda
- Studio: Brain's Base
- Licensed by: AUS: Hanabee; NA: Sentai Filmworks
- Original network: TBS, Sun TV, KBS, CBC, BS-TBS, Kids Station
- Original run: April 3, 2014 – June 19, 2014
- Episodes: 12
- Original video animation

First Time
- Directed by: Shigeyuki Miya
- Written by: Takeshi Konuta
- Music by: Akito Matsuda
- Studio: Brain's Base
- Licensed by: NA: Sentai Filmworks
- Released: December 26, 2014
- Runtime: 24 minutes
- icon

The Kawai Complex Guide to Manors and Hostel Behavior (僕らはみんな河合荘, Bokura wa Minna Kawaisou; lit. 'We Are All From Dormitory Kawai", a play on words that has a double meaning of "We Are All Pitiful') is a Japanese manga series by Ruri Miyahara, published in Shōnen Gahōsha's seinen manga magazine Young King OURs from the June 2010 issue till the February 2018 issue. It has been collected in eleven tankōbon volumes as of July 2018. An extra fan volume was published in August 2018. An anime television series adaptation produced by Brain's Base aired in Japan between April and June 2014.

== Plot ==
Thanks to his parents' job transfer, high school freshman Kazunari Usa finally gets to enjoy living on his own. His mother makes him stay at Kawai Complex, a boarding house that provides meals for its residents. Ritsu, the senpai he admires, also lives in Kawai Complex, as do a few other "unique" individuals: Shirosaki, his novelist, masochistic roommate; Mayumi, a beautiful, buxom office lady who has terrible luck with men; and Sayaka, a sly and predatory college student. Surrounded by these people, Usa finds his daily life neither peaceful nor boring. As the series progresses, Usa and Ritsu gradually become closer friends, and the pair's feelings for each other grow stronger. After a series of misunderstandings, including Usa's belief that Ritsu has developed feelings for a classmate and her thinking that he is kind to her out of pity rather than genuine caring, the two eventually become a couple towards the end of Usa's second year in high school.

== Characters ==
=== Kawai Dormitory ===
Kazunari Usa (宇佐 和成, Usa Kazunari)
Voiced by: Yūichi Iguchi
Usa Kazunari is a high school freshman whose parents had to move away for work. He agrees to stay anywhere, as long as he could live on his own in peace and quiet.
Having grown up surrounded by his parents' eccentric friends, Usa feels that unique individuals tend to gravitate to him resulting in what he considers a disastrous three years in middle school where he gained a reputation for handling odd people.
Although he initially balks at the idea of rooming with dysfunctional person, he decides to stay at the Kawai Complex and quickly adjusts to its residents' behaviors.
His favorite dish is hanbāgu.
Ritsu Kawai (河合 律, Kawai Ritsu)
Voiced by: Kana Hanazawa
Ritsu is a second year student at Usa's school and is the second resident that Usa meets. She is the daughter of the legal owner of Kawai Complex; a fact that she often brings up when a resident crosses the line. Often staying in the library where Usa saw her first, she loves reading books and becomes quite oblivious to her surroundings when she is engrossed at it. Painfully reticent, she is often expressionless but is prone to outbursts of emotion when something amuses, moves or embarrasses her. Aside from an avid attraction to traditional clothes, she greatly likes the cream puffs sold at a bakery by the station of which only thirty pieces are for sale each day. Despite her initial disinterest, she gradually grows to rely on Usa and falls in love with him without even realizing it.
In the manga Ritsu is depicted with black hair while in the anime she has brown hair.
Sumiko (住子)
Voiced by: Sanae Kobayashi
The manager of Kawai Dormitory and the sister of Ritsu's grandfather. She interviews potential boarders first to determine background and compatibility with the current residents. Wanting to be a perfect side character in a romantic drama, she sometimes practices on Usa by giving observations and comments that are meant to be of no value.
Rather insightful, she knows just when to serve a resident's favorite dish for dinner.
She keeps a doll collection in her room.
Shirosaki Shizuru (城崎)
Voiced by: Go Shinomiya
Usa's somewhat perverted author roommate. Known for being a masochist, he specializes in bondage and can tie complex knots that are difficult to undo.
He is good at crafting which he usually employs to while away boredom or make Mayumi feel better.
When outside, he is usually marched off to the police station for being a suspicious character.
Caught sticking his head through a hole in a fence that surrounded a grade school, he is the third resident that Usa meets.
His favorite dish is chicken katsu.
Mayumi Nishikino (錦野 麻弓, Nishikino Mayumi)
Voiced by: Rina Satō
An office lady who has terrible luck with men, she is the fourth resident that Usa meets. She is always spiteful to everyone, especially those who have found romance or about to find romance. She tends to drink alcohol heavily when depressed and nags when drunk. She is always on the lookout for something to use against Sayaka and considers Miharu a box full of Sayaka's weaknesses.
She is particularly fond of interfering with Usa and Ritsu's relationship. Though she often expresses displeasure at their budding romance, she seems to be happy for them in her own way.
Mayumi's favorite dish is oyakodon.
Sayaka Watanabe (渡辺 彩花, Watanabe Sayaka)
Voiced by: Hisako Kanemoto
A college student staying at Kawai Dormitory. She is the last resident that Usa meets. Sweet on the outside but loves to cause trouble for others, she has a penchant for leading men on. She loves to fondle Mayumi, much to the latter's resentment. She hardly leaves her room without any makeup on and it is implied that her bare face is very different.
During her classmate Miharu's visit later on in the series, it is revealed that Sayaka has dated both boys and girls, has a large collection of BL (Boy's Love) manga, and a rabid fear of rabbits.

=== Others ===
Chinatsu (千夏)
Voiced by: Ai Shimizu
An elementary school student who becomes attached to the Kawai Dormitory residents after Shirosaki found her wallet during a temporary falling out with her friends. She can be quite frank with her observations and can be unsparing when she speaks her mind. She has a fondness for pudding and, in Shirosaki's point of view, has the makings of a sadist.
Tagami (田神)
Voiced by: Junsuke Sakai
Usa's friend at school who has developed a crush on Mayumi after seeing her at the traditional café during a side trip of the mixer. He eventually sets his attentions on another girl from his class.
Hōjō (北条) / Yamamoto (山本)
Voiced by: Hikaru Midorikawa
Hōjō is one of the first employees Usa meets at his summer part time job. Going by the name Yamamoto at work, he appears to have assumed the "apprentice" character rather seriously and uses lyrical, explanatory notations to emphasize his words.
Kurokawa (黒川) / Saionji (西園寺)
Voiced by: Takashi Kondō
Kurokawa is also one of the first employees Usa meets at his summer part time job. Going by the name Saionji, he often speaks of guardian spirits which greatly reminds Usa of Hayashi.
Hayashi (林)
Voiced by: Manami Numakura
Usa's classmate back in middle school. She had an obsession to things occult and was among those Usa had to handle in middle school. Upon entering high school, she left the occult stuff behind her and underwent a makeover to appear more girly and fashionable. She has lingering feelings for Usa but treats him shabbily when they meet again which she regrets. As the series progresses, she is able to put these feelings aside and befriends Ritsu. She also becomes interested in Kurokawa, seeing in him a connection with her past self. Eventually, she is able to help Ritsu realize that not only are her feelings for Usa more than friendship, but that he also has feelings for her.
Miharu Tsuneda (常田 美晴, Tsuneda Miharu)
Voiced by: Ayaka Suwa
Sayaka's classmate back in middle school, Sayaka considers her as the only friend she can handle. Much to Sayaka's chagrin, she often shows up unannounced at the Kawai Complex. And because she knows a lot about how Sayaka behaved in middle school, the other residents often urge her to share the more embarrassing ones.
Maemura (前村)
Ritsu's classmate who befriended her during a temporary falling out with her own friends. In contrast with Ritsu who prefers reading in private, she considers reading a social activity. Although not as avid a fan of reading books as she makes herself out to be, Usa observes that she does genuinely love to read. In fact, it is revealed later that a good number of the class read the Count Bailey novels because of her recommendations.
Her association with Ritsu, however, does not last long and ends rather abruptly.
Norihiro Sakuma (佐久間 範弘, Sakuma Norihiro)
Is a middle school student who was caught red-handed by the Kawai Complex residents while vandalizing their wall with graffiti as an outlet for stress and pressure. A picture of when Shirosaki tied him up, to keep him from running away, is often used as a meme. After finding out that Usa and Ritsu are students at his dream high school, he starts to rely on Usa for tips on how to pass the qualifying exams.
He drops by the dormitory from time to time with Japanese sweets and other food that are usually high in sugar much to Mayumi's frustration.
Manami (愛美)
Is Mayumi's classmate when still in school. Just as popular and Mayumi's rival in good looks, she is also still unattached and single. Deemed as too independent and successful, her boyfriend decided to call off their engagement.
Akira (アキラ)
Was Mayumi's first boyfriend during high school. They broke up after a year of dating.
Yōko Mabuchi (馬淵 陽子, Mabuchi Yōko)
A former resident of Kawai Dormitory who had Sayaka's room before her. She works for a design company in Tokyo. Before she left the dorm she suffered bad luck with work related stuff, including once when Mayumi's boyfriend embezzled money from Mabuchi's coworker. She also has not made a good impression at her new job, which has left her depressed.

== Media ==
=== Manga ===
The Kawai Complex Guide to Manors and Hostel Behavior started as a manga series, written and drawn by Ruri Miyahara and published by Shōnen Gahōsha in their Young King OURs seinen manga magazine. The manga is also published online in English by Crunchyroll. The first chapter appeared in the June 2010 issue, released on April 30, 2010. The series has also been compiled in eleven tankōbon volumes, published between May 30, 2011, and July 30, 2018. On August 30, 2018, an additional volume was published. It contained unused illustrations and some new manga along with anime box set illustrations. The manga ended serialization on December 28, 2017, in the February 2018 issue.

No.	Release date	ISBN
1	May 30, 2011	978-4-7859-3631-0
2	January 30, 2012	978-4-7859-3777-5
3	August 30, 2012	978-4-7859-3909-0
4	May 30, 2013	978-4-7859-5057-6
5	March 26, 2014	978-4-7859-5251-8
6	November 29, 2014	978-4-7859-5435-2
7	September 30, 2015	978-4-7859-5634-9
8	May 30, 2016	978-4-7859-5789-6
9	April 28, 2017	978-4-7859-6006-3
10	June 30, 2018	978-4-7859-6235-7
11	July 30, 2018	978-4-7859-6257-9
Plus	August 30, 2018	978-4-7859-6278-4

=== Anime ===
A 12-episode anime television series adaptation, directed by Shigeyuki Miya at studio Brain's Base, aired on TBS from April 3 to June 19, 2014, and later on Sun TV, KBS, CBC, BS-TBS and Kids Station. The series was streamed with English subtitles by Crunchyroll. The anime has been licensed for digital and home video release by Sentai Filmworks. The opening theme is "Itsuka no, Iku Tsuka no Kimi to no Sekai" (Somewhen, Some Worlds With You) (いつかの、いくつかのきみとのせかい), sung by Fhána, and the ending theme is "My Sweet Shelter" by Kana Hanazawa, Rina Satō and Hisako Kanemoto. An unaired episode was released with the seventh part of the DVD and Blu-ray Disc release on December 26, 2014.

==== Episodes ====
No.	Title	Original release date
1	"Just Imagine" "Tatoeba" (たとえば)	April 3, 2014
After a disastrous three years of middle school, Kazunari Usa is eager to start fresh and lead a peaceful and normal high school life as a freshman. Because his parents had to move away for work, Usa finally gets the chance to enjoy living on his own. Although initially full of misgivings, especially after having come across resident and roommate Shirosaki Shizuru peeping lewdly through a grade school's fence, he decides to give Kawai Complex a try after discovering that the senpai he likes, Ritsu Kawai, also lives there. Having accepted harsh reality and hopeful to spend his youth with Ritsu by his side, Usa quickly makes peace with his current situation except that Ritsu is completely oblivious to his feelings for her, or even his existence at all. Shirosaki attempts to cheer him up by telling him to look forward to the other two female residents Mayumi Nishikino and Sayaka Watanabe. Late in the afternoon, Usa comes across a voluptuous and heartbroken woman drinking alcohol by a river while throwing a tantrum. Ritsu soon shows up to stop their bickering and introduces Usa to Mayumi, who had just come back from a trip and broken up with her latest boyfriend.
2	"Is it?" "Kore tte" (これって)	April 10, 2014
Except for a few misadventures during the holidays, laundry day and movie night, Usa's ability to gauge the social distance between himself and the residents enables him to easily settle in. He also gets to see a few other interesting aspects of Ritsu as she slowly opens up to him.
3	"Why" "Dōshite" (どうして)	April 17, 2014
Having spent a few eventful weeks at Kawai Complex, Usa's relationship with Ritsu remains, in his own words, awkwardly distant. But Ritsu's effort to explain to him her side of a misunderstanding makes him wonder even more if he had at last grown closer to her or not. An ex boyfriend making contact out of nowhere flusters Mayumi and frustrates the other residents. With the possibility of Mayumi rekindling a relationship, Ritsu's uncharacteristic reaction to this situation makes Usa wonder. An incident where Sayaka brings trouble to the Kawai Complex gate and embroils Usa sparks a heated discussion on how she handles her personal affairs. Later, Usa somehow manages to make Ritsu mad again.
4	"For Now" "Toriaezu" (とりあえず)	April 24, 2014
At Sayaka's innocent prodding, Usa becomes more resolute in walking Ritsu home even though she insists to be left alone. His persistence eventually earns him a sharp rebuke. However, Usa's behavior makes Ritsu contemplate on how other people perceive her.
5	"Thought So" "Yappari" (やっぱり)	May 1, 2014
Sayaka shares an awkward and annoying incident which leads to a discussion about how each of the three girls handle boys. This results in another awkward situation. Usa becomes interested in one of Ritsu's books after noticing that her mood improved when she started reading it. Usa finds the writing style a bit advanced but manages to persevere. It is revealed during a lull in the evening that Shirosaki used to write novels. Inspired by this discovery and in order to pass the time, the Kawai Complex residents agree to play the storytelling game. Meanwhile, the possibility of being incompatible because of differing opinions about the book which he just started to read makes Usa miss something important.
6	"Could It Be?" "Moshikashite" (もしかして)	May 8, 2014
Chinatsu, an elementary school girl whose wallet Shirosaki found, starts to frequent the Kawai Complex to visit the Pythogoras switch he was creating. The Kawai Complex residents then become involved in her social life as they worry about several things including the absence of friends her age and the possibility of Shirosaki ending up as a pedophile. All the while, the lingering question on Usa and Ritsu mind is how, in spite of no visible source of income, Shirosaki has never been late in paying his house rent. Chinatsu makes up with her friends and brings them over to the Kawai Complex to eat pudding and witness Shirosaki's contraption in motion. With Chinatsu back with her friends and the Pythogoras switch dismantled. Nothing more is left to do but eat chicken katsu for dinner.
7	"Recommended" "Osusume no" (おすすめの)	May 15, 2014
The residents of Kawai Complex talk about what precautionary measures to take while a molester remains at large. Of primary concern was Ritsu who loves to read while walking, oblivious to everything else. The situation becomes a perfect opportunity for walking together, tying someone up and the delivery of cheesy lines. Will Usa finally be able to make good progress aside from another good shinai beating? It is summer and with nothing to do, Usa asks Ritsu to recommend a book he could read. When the residents dine out at a restaurant, Usa catches the attention of the owner who deems him the perfect choice to fill a vacancy in a traditional café with 'unique' employees. Fearing a repeat of his disastrous experiences in middle school, Usa is quick to refuse. To his embarrassment, a name long since buried in forgetfulness is also unearthed. Only a cunningly desperate measure to capture Ritsu's passionate gaze can change his mind.
8	"Happy" "Ureshinu" (うれしぬ)	May 22, 2014
Usa meets the unique staff of the traditional café on his first day at work. He goes home later in a drained state. Later, at the Kawai Complex, after having been invited to and then barred from going to a mixer, Usa makes a frightening discovery with Mayumi and Sayaka's help. Still later, a character from Usa's "oddhand" days shows up at the café and treats him poorly. Just as Usa is about to drown in ridicule and despair, someone unexpected bravely steps forward for him. Sumiko serves hanbāgu for dinner.
9	"Forbidden" "Kindan no" (禁断の)	May 29, 2014
Tagami is smitten with Mayumi and begs Usa for help. Right around that time, Mayumi is down in the dumps again after she learns that she is now the only one left to be pitied at the office for still being single. With everyone else occupied with her, Usa and Ritsu gets the chance to talk about their previous and present circumstances. They both wonder why, even though Kawai Complex is chaotic because of its residents, they are able to tolerate it. Late at night, A mayhem ensues when a centipede goes on the loose in the "girl's area". Usa goes valiantly to the rescue. Tagami shows up at the Kawai Complex in the morning intent on asking Mayumi out on a date which somehow restores her self confidence.
10	"You Could Just Ignore It" "Hottokeba Ii no ni" (ほっとけばいいのに)	June 5, 2014
Hayashi shows up alone at the traditional café to offer her apologies to Usa which the latter accepts much to Sayaka and Mayumi's dismay. At the Kawai Complex, Chinatsu drops by after a long absence to let Shirosaki do her summer project as compensation for making him feel lonely. While working on the project, Chinatsu inadvertently makes Ritsu mad.
11	"Don't Have Any Friends" "Tomodachi Nanka Inai tte" (友達なんかいないって)	June 12, 2014
Since Chinatsu's last visit, things between Usa and Ritsu remain painfully uncomfortable. The Kawai Complex becomes livelier when Tsuneda, Sayaka's classmate from middle school, shows up unannounced at their doorstep. Even though friends, Usa and Mayumi marvel at how vastly different their personalities are. Because she has known Sayaka since middle school, they then consider her a boxful source of Sayaka's embarrassing escapades. Sometime later, Usa makes another frightening discovery when Sumiko lets loose a rabbit into Sayaka's room. Maemura, Ritsu's classmate, takes notice at how fond she is with books and starts to hang out with her. Usa can only watch helplessly by as Ritsu's quiet book reading life is thrown into disarray. When a get-together that Maemura organizes for booklovers turns out to be a mixer, Usa decides to take action.
12	"I Want to Get Closer" "Chikazukitakute" (近づきたくて)	June 19, 2014
Ritsu realizes the true nature of the get together and is lost at having been thrown in among strangers but is able to hold a conversation about books. She takes offense when a comment is made regarding other people's clumsy attempts at reading books. At the Kawai Complex, one night, Ritsu becomes drunk with plum wine. She opens up about her experiences with Maemura and uncharacteristically nags about Usa's easy-going attitude as well as his continuous proximity to Hayashi. The next morning, Ritsu and Usa agree to share their thoughts on the many characters from the book that she lent him. At last, Usa works out the courage to ask for her contact details.
OVA	"First Time" "Hajimete no" (初めての)	January 30, 2015
With the school festival just around the corner, Usa barely makes it for dinner and begins spending the night at the school to help with the preparations. At the same time, he can't help but worry that his prolonged absence will drive them apart. On the day of the school festival, when Ritsu's classmates dress her up in a butler costume and ask her to walk around for publicity, she discovers that a lot of her classmates have read the Count Bailey novels at Maemura's recommendation. While taking a break, Ritsu saves Hayashi from trouble but puts herself in danger for doing so. It is then at this point that Ritsu relies on Usa for the first time.

== See also ==
- Love Lab, another manga series by Ruri Miyahara.
