= Chō Jikū Robo Meguru =

Japanese original video animation (OVA)

超時空ロボMEGURU
- Genre: Mecha
- Original video animation
- Directed by: Keiji Gotoh
- Written by: Shōji Yonemura
- Studio: Brain's Base; Studio A-Cat
- Released: November 2014
- Runtime: 8 minutes

Chō Jikū Robo Meguru (超時空ロボMEGURU, lit. Hyperdimension Robo Meguru) is a Japanese mecha original video animation produced by Brain's Base and Studio A-Cat, and directed by Keiji Gotoh.

== Cast ==
Meguru Tokio (時緒 めぐる, Tokio Meguru)
Voiced by: Kana Asumi
Meguru (メグル)
Voiced by: Marina Inoue
