= I've Somehow Gotten Stronger When I Improved My Farm-Related Skills =

Japanese light novel series and its adaptations

- First light novel volume cover

農民関連のスキルばっか上げてたら何故か強くなった。 (Nōmin Kanren no Sukiru Bakka Agetetara Nazeka Tsuyoku Natta)
- Genre: Fantasy, harem
- Novel series
- Written by: Shobonnu
- Published by: Shōsetsuka ni Narō
- Original run: August 2, 2016 – May 16, 2018
- Light novel
- Written by: Shobonnu
- Illustrated by: Sogawa
- Published by: Futabasha
- Imprint: Monster Bunko
- Original run: March 30, 2017 – November 30, 2018
- Volumes: 5
- Manga
- Written by: Shobonnu
- Illustrated by: Aki Taruto
- Published by: Futabasha
- Imprint: Monster Comics
- Magazine: Web Comic Action
- Original run: April 6, 2018 – December 18, 2024
- Volumes: 11
- Anime television series
- Directed by: Norihiko Nagahama
- Produced by: Naoki Ae; Masaki Ishii; Mikito Kyo; Emi Miyamoto; Koutarou Nakamura; Fumihiro Ozawa; Mika Sugimoto; Takeshi Uchida; Hayato Tsumashika
- Written by: Touko Machida
- Music by: Takurō Iga
- Studio: Studio A-Cat
- Licensed by: Sentai Filmworks: SEA: Plus Media Networks Asia
- Original network: Tokyo MX, SUN, BS NTV, HTB
- Original run: October 1, 2022 – December 17, 2022
- Episodes: 12
- icon

I've Somehow Gotten Stronger When I Improved My Farm-Related Skills (農民関連のスキルばっか上げてたら何故か強くなった。, Nōmin Kanren no Sukiru Bakka Agetetara Nazeka Tsuyoku Natta) is a Japanese light novel series written by Shobonnu and illustrated by Sogawa. It was serialized online between August 2016 and May 2018 on the user-generated novel publishing website Shōsetsuka ni Narō. It was later acquired by Futabasha, who have published five volumes from March 2017 to November 2018 under their Monster Bunko imprint. A manga adaptation with art by Aki Taruto was serialized via Futabasha's digital publication Web Comic Action from April 2018 to December 2024. An anime television series adaptation by Studio A-Cat aired from October to December 2022.

== Plot ==
Al Wayne's dream is to live a peaceful life as a farmer. After working hard his entire life, his physical attributes like strength and speed have skyrocketed. As he can slay monsters with ease, he finds himself reluctantly caught up in battles and schemes involving the country and royal family.

== Characters ==
Al Wayne (アル・ウェイン, Aru Wein)
Voiced by: Junya Enoki (Japanese); Antonio Lasanta (English)
The main protagonist, a farmer who has the blessing of Growth Promotion; allowing him to master skills ridiculously fast. By leveling up high enough, Al receives the Grace of the Earth's ability, for being a True Lover of Nature. Thus he ends up with the Attack Power of 73612; just tossing a carrot at a dragon makes it explode.
Fal-Ys Meigis (ファル・イース・メイギス, Faru Īsu Meigisu)
Voiced by: Minami Tanaka (Japanese); Luci Christian (English)
First Princess of the Royal Capital of Mages. Al saved her from a kidnapping and arranged marriage by chance. She pretty much manipulates Al into working for the royal family because she wouldn't let him turn down the offer. While hanging out with Al, her alias outside her royal duties is Filia and she disguises her appearance with a magical hairpin.
Helen Rean (ヘレン・リーン, Heren Rīn)
Voiced by: Rumi Okubo (Japanese); Elissa Cuellar (English)
A receptionist at the Adventurer's Guild and also a part time adventurer, she is the sole survivor of a village that was destroyed by the Dragon of Malevolence. It is hinted that she harbors feelings for Al and also has a friendly love rivalry with Ruri and Fal-Ys for Al's attention.
Ruri (ルリ)
Voiced by: Ayaka Suwa (Japanese); Kristen McGuire (English)
An adventurer who is also a descendant of the Hero, she strives to become a hero herself and live up to the name. She meets Al by chance on his way to see his parents and becomes a hired armed escort. Despite her childhood of being bullied for not having powers like her ancestor, she later taps into the latent power with Al's help against a powerful demon. She develops feelings for Al which later leads to a friendly rivalry with Helen and Fal-Ys.
Ilvia (イルビア, Irubia)
Voiced by: Yukari Tamura (Japanese); Kalin Coates, Alyssa Marek (English)
Al's childhood love and adopted sister. She died giving food to her adopted brother, only to be brought back to life by a scheme of the Evil God and its power; Ilvia still loves Al despite the circumstances.
Reaks (リークス, Rīkusu)
Voiced by: Masahiro Itō (Japanese); James Marler (English)
A speedy and dedicated postman who works at the Capital of Mages. He manages to deliver mail to Al, even in the most obscure places.
Lucica Wayne (ルシカ・ウェイン, Rushika Wein)
Voiced by: Mai Nakahara (Japanese); Molly Searcy (English)
Al's obsessively doting mother. She constantly sends letters to Al with information as well as professions of love, much to his chagrin. She gets incredibly jealous and possessive towards any of her son's love interest. It was shown later that she was a former commander of an elite group known for intelligence gathering.
Gilles Wayne (ジル・ウェイン, Jiru Wein)
Voiced by: Kenji Hamada (Japanese); Cyrus Rodas (English)
Al's father who is also extremely devoted to his wife Lucica. He gets extremely jealous if any man tries to approach her that he mistook his son for another womanizer, only to be the receiving end of Lucica's tantrums.

== Media ==
=== Light novels ===
The series written by Shobonnu was serialized online from August 2016 to May 2018 on the user-generated novel publishing website Shōsetsuka ni Narō. It was later acquired by Futabasha, who published the series as a light novel under their Monster Bunko imprint with illustrations by Sogawa in five volumes from March 30, 2017, to November 30, 2018.

No.	Release date	ISBN
1	March 30, 2017	978-4-575-75127-7
2	August 30, 2017	978-4-575-75155-0
3	January 30, 2018	978-4-575-75183-3
4	June 30, 2018	978-4-575-75212-0
5	November 30, 2018	978-4-575-75229-8

=== Manga ===
A manga adaptation with art by Aki Taruto was serialized via Futabasha's digital publication Web Comic Action from April 2018 to December 18, 2024. It was collected in eleven tankōbon volumes released from June 30, 2018, to February 27, 2025.

No.	Release date	ISBN
1	June 30, 2018	978-4-575-41029-7
2	December 28, 2018	978-4-575-41043-3
3	June 28, 2019	978-4-575-41065-5
4	December 28, 2019	978-4-575-41094-5
5	June 30, 2020	978-4-575-41131-7
6	December 28, 2020	978-4-575-41190-4
7	July 15, 2021	978-4-575-41260-4
8	February 28, 2022	978-4-575-41348-9
9	September 30, 2022	978-4-575-41499-8
10	April 28, 2023	978-4-575-41616-9
11	February 27, 2025	978-4-575-42094-4

=== Anime ===
On February 26, 2022, an anime television series adaptation was announced. The series is produced by Studio A-Cat and directed by Norihiko Nagahama, with scripts written by Touko Machida, character designs handled by Masami Sueoka, and music composed by Takurō Iga. It aired from October 1 to December 17, 2022, on Tokyo MX, SUN, BS NTV, and HTB. 7ORDER will perform the opening theme song "Growing up", while Pop Shinanaide will perform the ending theme song "Rolling Soul Happy Days" (ローリンソウル・ハッピーデイズ, Rōrin Sōru Happī Deizu). Sentai Filmworks has licensed the series, but has instead delayed the first episode's simulcast by a week to October 8, alongside the second episode.

==== Episodes ====
No.	Title	Directed by (Note: Information is taken from the ending credits of each episode.)	Written by	Storyboarded by	Original release date
1	"Foremost First-rate Farmer"; Transliteration: "Chō Ichiryū Nōmin" (Japanese: 超一流農民)	Norihiko Nagahama	Touko Machida	Gōichi Iwahata	October 1, 2022
Farmer Al succeeds in promoting his farming skills to level 10 which for some reason increases his warrior abilities to 65,000 points. He sees adventurers fighting an S Rank dragon and attempts to distract it by throwing a carrot, only for the carrot to kill the dragon. In Meigis city a criminal kidnaps Princess Fal-Ys, but with his new abilities Al saves her. Fal-Ys is surprised, revealing the kidnapper had over 500 warrior points, impressive since normal humans typically only have 50, and yet Al defeated him. News reaches Meigis of a monster army not seen since Demon Lord Macbeth was killed. Officer Cecil demands they destroy the army, but after luring Fal-Ys and her father the King away from Meigis, he reveals he is actually Romeo Vandead, Macbeth's Demon General, and intends to murder Fal-Ys and the King, and then pose as the king to rule Meigis himself. Al suddenly intervenes; having worried the army would destroy Meigis, leaving him nowhere to sell his vegetables. Romeo is defeated with just one punch from Al. As a reward Fal-Ys offers Al a 33,000 square metre field to farm, in exchange for him registering as an adventurer to serve the Kingdom when needed. Al agrees but realises he was tricked when he visits the field and finds a wasteland unsuitable for farming.
2	"The Farmer and the Guild"; Transliteration: "Nōmin to Girudo" (Japanese: 農民とギルド)	Akira Mano	Kyōko Katsuya	Shin'ichi Watanabe	October 8, 2022
Fal-Ys takes Al to the guild to register with guild secretary Helen. Al accepts his first quest so Helen gives him her old robe as beginner's equipment. In the forest a super rare Black Dragon appears with such a terrifying aura even Al is frozen with fear; luckily it ignores him completely. Helen suffers nightmares and memory lapses. Al reports the dragon to the guild which, by appraising its stats he identifies as Ouroboros the Malevolent. Helen abruptly remembers a buried memory of her brother Rai who was killed by Ouroboros and was the original wearer of Al's new robe. Helen's adoptive mother, Won, is surprised Helen gave Al her robe, explaining when she found Helen as a child all she had was amnesia and that robe. A young postman named Reaks delivers Al a letter from his mother. Al and Fal-Ys access reports from the day Helen was found and discover Ouroboros had destroyed Honol village, which may have been Helen's birthplace. They also learn Ouroboros was supposedly killed by his enemy dragon Mirage the Benevolent. Searching Honol, Al encounters Rai as a ghost, though Fal-Ys is unable to see him, and Rai explains he has waited 15 years for someone who could see him.
3	"The Farmer and the Malevolent Dragon Ouroboros"; Transliteration: "Nōmin to Jaryū Uroborosu" (Japanese: 農民と邪龍ウロボロス)	Tsutomu Murakami	Chabō Higurashi	Nobuyoshi Arai	October 15, 2022
In flashback to when Honol was destroyed it is shown Ouroboros first terrified his victims to feed on their despair filled souls. He then left Helen alive so she could spread the story, causing fear in other human villages so that in fifteen years when Ouroboros returned a new feast of human despair would be ready. Rai became a ghost so he could watch Helen and now warns Al Ouroboros will want Helen and the city of Meigis. Al worries he is not strong enough but Rai tells him that if Ouroboros feeds on despair then opposing emotions should weaken him. Al and Fal-Ys rush back to Meigis to prepare for Ourobos' return. Helen, driven by her returning memories of Rai's death, confronts Ouroboros in the forest to offer her life in exchange for Meigis. Al finds Helen before she can commit suicide and punches Ouroboros so hard he actually hurts him. He passes Helen a message from Rai that his death was not her fault and she needs to forgive herself. Helen's soul becomes filled with hope, a deadly poison to Ouroboros whose stats fall so far Al's next punch knocks him unconscious. Al is shocked when Helen abruptly stabs him in the chest.
4	"The Farmer and the Life That Was Saved"; Transliteration: "Nōmin to Sukuwareta Inochi" (Japanese: 農民と救われた命)	Rokō Ogiwara	Touko Machida	Shin'ichi Watanabe	October 22, 2022
Al is abruptly saved by Mirage who reveals Helen is possessed by Ouroboros and so grants Al his purification magic to heal his injury. Ouroboros is confident Al won't attack Helen, only for Al to hit her with a powerful blow, revealing Helen had communicated with Al using her eyes. Ouroboros attempts to possess Al but finds his mind filled only with a pure desire to farm. With no negative thoughts to manipulate Ouroboros is expelled and purified by Mirage. Al awakens in Meigis where Helen and Fal-Ys reveal Mirage also disappeared. Helen reveals that she can now turn any part of her body into dragon limbs at will, which she intends to use to protect others and live happily in Rai's memory. Days later Reaks delivers Al a letter from his father asking him to visit them in Lurugus and Al is excited to go as Lurugus is famous for its farming and excellent fertilizer. Helen grants Al a holiday and takes over his active quests, revealing with her dragon-limbs she is now an F-rank adventurer. Fal-Ys asks to accompany him to meet his parents, but fearing bringing a girl to his parents would cause misunderstandings Al quickly leaves alone. On his journey, Al is almost violated by a lust-crazed male Orc, but the Orc is killed just in time by a young woman.
5	"The Farmer and Lurugus"; Transliteration: "Nōmin to Rurugusu" (Japanese: 農民とルルグス)	Yoshito Hata	Kyōko Katsuya	Shin'ichi Watanabe	October 29, 2022
The girl, Ruri, offers to escort Al to Lurugus. Reaks somehow finds them with another letter from Al's mother. Ruri is saddened by this as her own family don't care about her at all. Ruri makes camp, revealing her bag can hold numerous large items despite its small size; inherited from her hero ancestor who defeated Demon Lord Macbeth. Ruri is training and has heard Lurugus is plagued by accidents and demon sightings. She hopes to one day live up to the hero's legacy. Reaching Lurugus Ruri is saddened by their separation, so Al asks her to escort him home again in a week. Al visits his parents; his overly-doting housewife mother Lucica and muscle-bound farmer father Gilles. Al merely mentions Ruri and Lucica goes wild, claiming Al is too young for girls, marriage and babies, comically punishing both Al and Gilles. Gilles is suspicious of Ruri as there are definitely no accidents or demon sightings in Lurugus. After purchasing his fertiliser a sinister man lures Al to the forest with Ruri, revealing he has manipulated them with powerful illusion magic and even lured Ruri to Lurugus in the first place with fake rumours of demons as he knows she is the hero's descendant.
6	"The Farmer and the Hero Who Can't Become a Hero"; Transliteration: "Nōmin to Yūsha ni Narenai Yūsha" (Japanese: 農民と勇者になれない勇者)	Norihiko Nagahama	Touko Machida	Gōichi Iwahata	November 5, 2022
The man identifies as Loki, a demon who took an interest in Al after he defeated Romeo and Ouroboros. Loki is eliminating anyone who could stop the next Demon King; Ruri because she may one day be the hero, Al for his abilities and Helen who absorbed Oroboros' power. Loki has leech monsters begin eating Al but Al feeds them the fertiliser, which is also a pesticide, and the leeches die. Ruri feels shame for letting her family belittle her into feeling worthless. Her sudden belief in herself unlocks the hero's power and Loki is killed. Al passes out from exhaustion and Ruri realises she has fallen in love with him. Al awakens hours later but a new danger appears; Al is late home and Lucica is hunting for him. Fearing for Ruri's life if they are found together Al carries her back to Lurugus just in time. Al decides to return to his farm. Lucica is concerned Al still insists on farming and it is suggested Al only became a farmer due to a death in his past. With Ruri escorting him to Meigis they both worry demons may target them again and decide to keep each other safe, though their promise flusters Ruri.
7	"The Farmer and the Princess's Resolve"; Transliteration: "Nōmin to Ōjo no Ketsui" (Japanese: 農民と王女の決意)	Kaoru Yabana	Touko Machida	Shin'ichi Watanabe	November 12, 2022
Fal-Ys has a difficult conversation with her father. Al learns monster attacks have halted all inter-kingdom trading with many people now starving. The monsters are driven away by Prince Nedilus of Antisberg Kingdom, wielding the sacred sword Lævateinn. Fal-Ys abruptly informs Al she is leaving Meigis forever. With the monsters gone trade returns to normal but everyone learns Fal-Ys left to marry Nedilus. Al receives a letter from Lucica, revealed as former leader of intelligence gathering group the Shadow Puppets, that Lævateinn is a fake; the monsters are being unwillingly controlled by a peaceful demon named Gazel whose human lover is held hostage by Nedilus. Al realises Nedilus faked the monster attacks so he could demand Fal-Ys marry him in exchange for saving Meigis. Al, Helen and Ruri hire Reaks to safely deliver them to Antisberg with his strangely efficient postman skills. Nedilus leverages other kingdoms into giving him land, money and trade agreements in exchange for his protection from monsters and intends to marry Fal-Ys in the morning. Al obtains disguises while Reaks, revealed as a peaceful demon and a Shadow Puppet, sets out to gather real monsters so they can expose Nedilus as a fraud. In Antisberg Nedilus is angry to overhear Fal-Ys cry at never seeing Al again.
8	"The Farmer and the Wedding"; Transliteration: "Nōmin to Kekkonshiki" (Japanese: 農民と結婚式)	Kaoru Yabana	Kyōko Katsuya	Shin'ichi Watanabe	November 19, 2022
Al, Helen and Ruri sneak into Antisberg intending to rescue Gazel's lover so Gazel will be free. Unfortunately Al exposes them immediately, so Helen and Ruri fight the soldiers while Al rescues Gazel's lover and takes her to the church in time to crash the wedding. Fal-Ys is overjoyed to see Al who exposes Nedilus' fraud. Reaks invades with his own monster army; with his lover returned Gazel refuses to control the monsters and Nedilus cannot repel them with the fake Lævateinn. Furious, Nedilus reveals he sent another monster army to Meigis, but Helen and Ruri had anticipated this and had organised Meigis' adventurers into a formidable army that defeats the monsters. With his crimes exposed Nedilus' own soldiers arrest him. Fal-Ys declares she is in love with the shocked Al. The king happily accepts an unwilling Al as his future son-in-law, infuriating Ruri. In his role as a Shadow Puppet, Reaks shows the king evidence Nedilus plans were secretly masterminded by someone else. Fal-Ys and Ruri develop an intense rivalry for Al, who ends up caught in the middle. They are shocked when Al claims another woman already has his heart. Al is later seen placing his harvest at a shrine to someone called Ilvia.
9	"Al's Past"; Transliteration: "Aru no Kako" (Japanese: アルの過去)	Kaoru Yabana	Kyōko Katsuya	Shin'ichi Watanabe	November 26, 2022
Fifteen years ago a young orphan named Ilvia was forced to steal crops to survive. Farmers caught her by surprise and decided to sold her to the slave traders but Al's parents paid for everything she stole and adopted Ilvia. Two years later Lucica and Gilles decided to buy a house in the city and went house hunting while Al and Ilvia looked after the farm. Al's best friend Testa claimed a treasure was hidden in the forest and invites him to search together. Ilvia wants to tag along but stopped by Al because the place might be dangerous for her. While searching, Testa told Al that Gilles and Lucica planned to move into the city because the farmers still mistreated Ilvia badly. Al discovered an abandoned city in a cave but suddenly triggered a trap that caused a volcano to erupt, blocking out the sun with ash and killing all the crops. Getting cut off from the city by a collapsed bridge, people were forced to ration their remaining food as supplies couldn't get to them, nor could Gilles and Lucica. Ilvia considered stealing again but instead secretly gave Al her food rations due to Al protecting her in the past. Ilvia eventually died of malnutrition and Al blamed himself after realizing Ilvia had sacrificed herself to help him live. In the present Al is sad that he grows so much food Ilvia will never get to eat but swears to continue farming so no one starves again.
10	"The Farmer and the Town of Ashparagus"; Transliteration: "Nōmin to Ashipara no Machi" (Japanese: 農民とアシパラの街)	Shigeki Awai	Chabō Higurashi	Shin'ichi Tōkairin	December 3, 2022
A girl named Linea requests an adventurer investigate something "wrong" with her town of Gal. Helen is uneasy with such a vague description so Al volunteers, hoping to examine the Aspara vegetable grown in Gal. In Gal, Al notices citizens acting hypnotised. Linea reveals she possesses an anti hypnosis necklace and also gives one to Al. Gal's Lord Remul has Al attacked by soldiers who he easily defeats, but Linea protects Remul who has her parents as hostages. Remul is himself possessed by demon Vritra and via a magic crystal has hypnotised all humans. Desiring Al's strength Vritra had Linea lure Al there so Vritra can implant the crystal in Al's body and hypnotise the whole world. The crystal is suddenly destroyed by Helen and Ruri, ending the hypnosis. Al reveals they were his emergency backup kept secret from Linea just in case she was also hypnotised. He helps Remul expel Vritra from his body by stuffing his mouth with Aspara, which Remul is obsessed with, and Al defeats Vritra. Linea lets Al keep the necklace as a memento, then kisses him, declaring when she is old enough she will marry him, even if he has already married another woman. Helen and Ruri punish Al for the kiss.
11	"The Farmer and the Reunion at the Demon King Castle"; Transliteration: "Nōmin to Maōjō no Saikai" (Japanese: 農民と魔王城の再会)	Fumio Maezono	Chabō Higurashi	Ichizō Kobayashi	December 10, 2022
Fal-Ys learns about Linea and is upset Al is friends with yet another woman. Al is enraged to find his fields infested with Bush-gillers, a viny weed. The King visits Al to convince him to marry Fal-Ys already. This causes an argument between the girls that knocks Al unconscious. While asleep Al has a brief vision of a winged woman. Al purchases herbicide to battle the Bush-gillers but is distracted saving a small girl from kidnappers. Reaks identifies her as Yuria, daughter and heir of the Demon King. She reveals her caretaker Volpe had suddenly told her she was in danger and teleported her away from her fathers castle; she wants Al to escort her home across the ocean. Al agrees and puts Reaks in charge of killing the Bush-gillers. As ships are expensive Al instead runs Yuria across the ocean surface. They are immediately found by a hypnotised Volpe who attacks Yuria. Volpe is abruptly knocked out by Lucica, who followed Al across the ocean after learning about Yuria from Reaks. At the castle, they find Yuria's father injured and unconscious. Lucica suddenly tries to kill Yuria, revealing she is actually a disguised Ilvia, still alive and now an adult.
12	"The Farmer and the Renewed Resolve"; Transliteration: "Nōmin to Arata na Ketsui" (Japanese: 農民と新たな決意)	Norihiko Nagahama	Touko Machida	Makoto Ogihara	December 17, 2022
Ilvia reveals she was resurrected by the Evil God who granted her overwhelming power. Ilvia also reveals Al's Lover of Nature skill, which makes him so strong, was actually a gift from Evil God, and that Al has already met Evil God. She then demands Al swear loyalty to her or she will kill his family and friends. Time suddenly freezes and Al meets the winged woman again, revealed to be Good God, who removes Evil God's power from Al and replaces it with her own. With his new power Al rescues Yuria so Ilvia teleports away, promising to see Al soon. Fal-Ys leaves the palace while her sinister maid, Albie, acts as her body double. Al believes it was Evil God who erupted the volcano when he was young and asks Testa about it, but Testa remembers nothing. Al invites Testa to the city but he refuses, privately revealing he cannot leave the village for a mysterious reason. Al almost loses against an orc and realises losing Evil God's Lover of Nature skill has cost him most of his power. Reaks delivers a letter from Lucica who is in the middle of an important investigation. Al decides to continue as a normal farmer/adventurer until he can learn more about Evil God. Ilvia looks forward to seeing Al again.
