= Fhána =

Japanese pop band

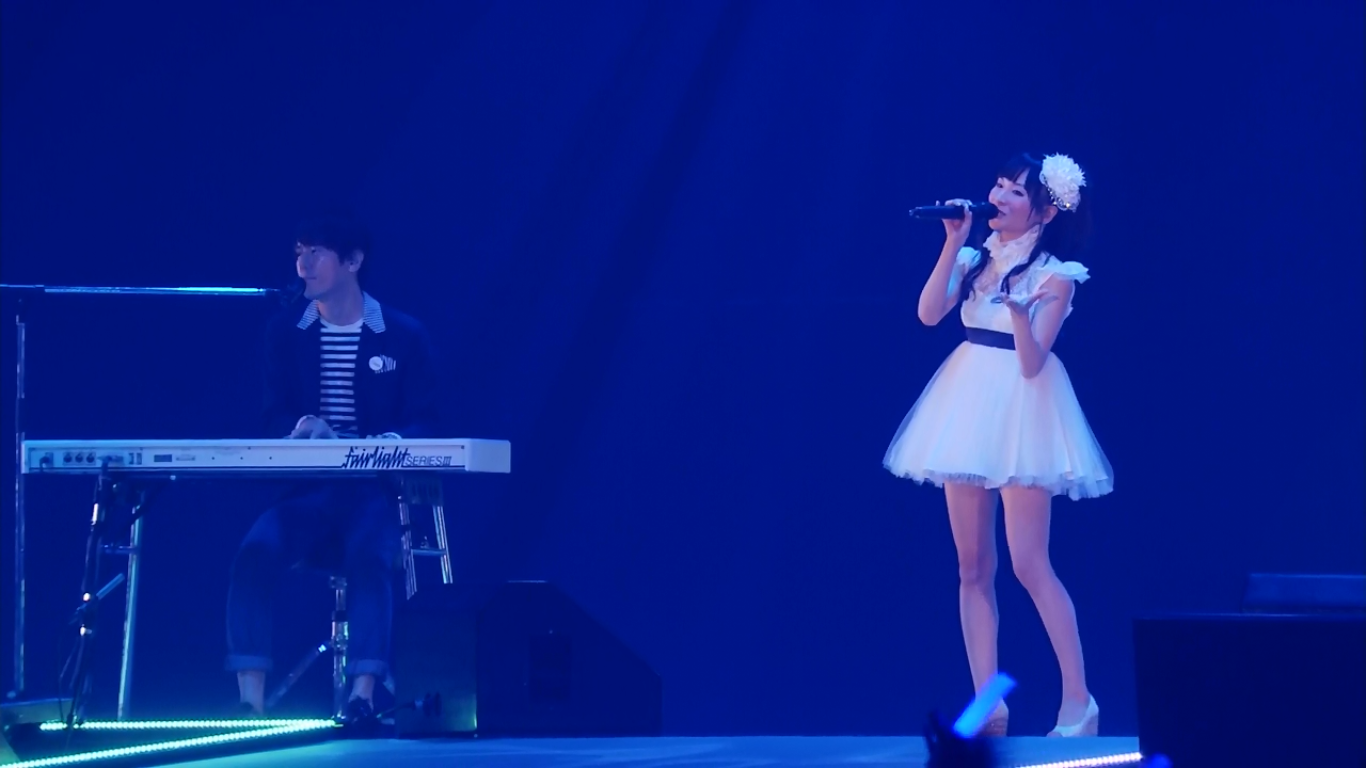
- Fhána from Animelo Summer Live 2014 concert showing Jun'ichi Satō using a Fairlight Series III synthesizer keyboard

Background information
- Origin: Japan
- Genres: J-pop, anison
- Years active: 2012–present
- Labels: Lantis (2013–2023); Nippon Columbia (2023 onwards)
- Members: Jun'ichi Satō; Kevin Mitsunaga; Towana
- Past members: Yuxuki Waga
- Website: fhana.jp

Fhána (stylized as fhána) is a three-member Japanese pop band that formed in 2012 as an indie band. After releasing one album independently, they were signed in 2013 to Lantis. They released their debut single "Que Sera Sera" in August 2013.

== History ==
Fhána originally formed with Jun'ichi Satō, Yuxuki Waga, and Kevin Mitsunaga, all three having previously been involved in separate independent bands. Fhána did not have a fixed vocalist at first, instead employing guest vocalists to sing the band's songs. Fhána released their independent album New World Line on May 18, 2012, featuring four guest vocalists: Makiko Naka, Towana, IA (a Vocaloid sampling of Lia's voice), and Aoi Tada. In late 2012, Towana joined Fhána as the official vocalist. Fhána was signed to Lantis in 2013 and released their major debut single "Que Sera Sera" (ケセラセラ, Ke Sera Sera) on August 21, 2013; the song is used as the ending theme to the 2013 anime series The Eccentric Family.

The band's second single "Tiny Lamp" was released on November 23, 2013; the song is used as the opening theme to the 2013 anime series Gingitsune. Their third single "Divine Intervention" was released on January 22, 2014; the song is used as the opening theme to the 2014 anime series Witch Craft Works. Fhána's fourth single "Itsuka no, Ikutsuka no Kimi to no Sekai" (いつかの、いくつかのきみとのせかい) was released on April 30, 2014; the song is used as the opening theme to the 2014 anime series The Kawai Complex Guide to Manors and Hostel Behavior. Fhána released an updated version of their New World Line album titled View from New World Line on May 28, 2014, via iTunes. The band's fifth single "Hoshikuzu no Interlude" (星屑のインターリュード) was released on November 5, 2014; the song is used as the ending theme to the 2014 anime series Celestial Method. Fhána's major debut album Outside of Melancholy was released on February 4, 2015.

Fhána's sixth single "Wonder Stella" (ワンダーステラ) was released on August 5, 2015; the song is used as the opening theme to the 2015 anime series Fate/kaleid liner Prisma Illya 2wei Herz!. Fhána's seventh single "Comet Lucifer (The Seed and the Sower)" (コメットルシファー ～The Seed and the Sower～) was released on October 28, 2015; the song is used as the opening theme to the 2015 anime series Comet Lucifer. Fhána's eighth single "Niji o Ametara" (虹を編めたら) was released on January 27, 2016; the song is used as the opening theme to the 2016 anime series Haruchika. Fhána's second studio album What a Wonderful World Line was released on April 27, 2016.

Fhána's ninth single "Calling" was released on August 3, 2016; the song is used as the ending theme song to the 2016 anime series Tales of Zestiria the X. The band's tenth single "Aozora no Rhapsody" (青空のラプソディ, Aozora no Rapusodi) was released on January 25, 2017; the song is used as the opening theme to the 2017 anime series Miss Kobayashi's Dragon Maid. Fhána's 11th single "Moon River" (ムーンリバー) was released on April 26, 2017; the song is used as the ending theme to the second season of The Eccentric Family. Their 12th single "Hello! My World!!" was released on August 2, 2017; the song is used as the opening theme to the 2017 anime series Knight's & Magic. The band's 13th single "Watashi no Tame no Monogatari (My Uncompleted Story)" (わたしのための物語 〜My Uncompleted Story〜) was released on January 31, 2018; the song is used as the opening theme to the 2018 anime series Märchen Mädchen. Fhána's third studio album World Atlas was released on March 28, 2018.

Their 14th single "Boku o Mitsukete" (僕を見つけて) was released on August 7, 2019, and their 15th single "Hoshi o Atsumete" (星をあつめて) was released on February 26, 2020. Fhána subsequently released three digital singles: "Pathos" on December 18, 2020, "Ethos" on March 12, 2021, and "Nameless Color" on April 9, 2021. "Nameless Color" is featured in Square Enix's rhythm game Show By Rock!! Fes A Live. Fhána's 16th single "Ai no Supreme!" (愛のシュプリーム) was released on July 7, 2021; the title song is used as the opening theme to the 2021 anime series Miss Kobayashi's Dragon Maid S.

On March 10, 2022, Fhána announced that their contract with Lantis has expired and they have signed with Nippon Columbia. Their 17th single "Runaway World", released on May 25, was the band's first released under their new label. In November of the same year, the band announced that Yuxuki would be leaving Fhána in January 2023, his final concert with the band was the Fhána Cipher Live Tour 2022 in Nagoya.

The band contributed two songs titled "Eien to Iu Hikari" (永遠という光)" and "Last Pages", as the opening and ending theme respectively, to the 2023 visual novel One. Both songs are included in Fhána's first extended play Beautiful Dreamer, released on December 20, 2023, the EP was announced in October 2023, during their 10th anniversary concert There Is The Light. To commemorate the release of their first EP, the band held the Beautiful Dreamer ASIA Tour 2024 in South Korea, Taiwan, and Tokyo, beginning in January 2024, which was also their first live performance outside Japan.

== Members ==
Current members

- Jun'ichi Satō – keyboards, backing vocals
- Kevin Mitsunaga – sampler, metallophone, synthesizers, backing vocals
- Towana – vocals

Former members

- Yuxuki Waga – guitar (2012–2023)

== Discography ==
=== Albums ===
==== Studio albums ====
Year	Album details	Peak Oricon chart positions
2012	New World Line: Released: May 18, 2012; Format: CD	—
2014	View from New World Line: Released: May 28, 2014; Format: Digital distribution	—
2015	Outside of Melancholy: Released: February 4, 2015; Label: Lantis (LACA-15473, LACA-35473); Format: CD, CD+BD	8
2016	What a Wonderful World Line: Released: April 27, 2016; Label: Lantis (LACA-15557, LACA-35557); Format: CD, CD+BD	22
2018	World Atlas: Released: March 28, 2018; Label: Lantis (LACA-15713, LACA-35713); Format: CD, CD+BD	30
2022	Cipher: Released: April 27, 2022; Label: Lantis; Format: CD	35
"—" denotes releases that did not chart.

==== Compilation albums ====
Year	Album details	Peak Oricon chart positions
2018	Stories: Released: December 12, 2018; Label: Lantis (LACA-15765, LACA-35765); Format: CD, CD+BD	34

==== Extended plays ====
Year	Album details	Peak Oricon chart positions
2023	Beautiful Dreamer: Released: December 20, 2023; Label: Nippon Columbia (COCX-42155, COZX-2063); Format: CD, CD+DVD	—
"—" denotes releases that did not chart.

=== Singles ===
Year	Song	Peak Oricon chart positions	Album
2013	"Que Sera Sera"	111	Outside of Melancholy
2013	"Tiny Lamp"	84	Outside of Melancholy
2014	"Divine Intervention"	52	Outside of Melancholy
2014	"Itsuka no, Ikutsuka no Kimi to no Sekai"	41	Outside of Melancholy
2014	"Hoshikuzu no Interlude"	22	Outside of Melancholy
2015	"Wonder Stella"	53	What a Wonderful World Line
2015	"Comet Lucifer (The Seed and the Sower)"	55	What a Wonderful World Line
2016	"Niji o Ametara"	46	What a Wonderful World Line
2016	"Calling"	42	World Atlas
2017	"Aozora no Rhapsody"	24	World Atlas
2017	"Moon River"	53	World Atlas
2017	"Hello! My World!!"	31	World Atlas
2018	"Watashi no Tame no Monogatari (My Uncompleted Story)"	49	World Atlas
2019	"Boku o Mitsumete"	76	Non-album single
2020	"Hoshi o Atsumete"	41	Non-album single
2021	"Ai no Supreme!"	31	Non-album single
2023	"Runaway World"	—	Non-album single
"—" denotes releases that did not chart.

==== Digital singles ====
Year	Song	Album
2020	"Pathos"	Cipher
2021	"Ethos"	Cipher
2021	"Nameless Color"	Cipher

=== Music videos ===
Year	Song	Director
2013	"Que Sera Sera"	Hideaki Fukui
2013	"Tiny Lamp"	Hideaki Fukui
2014	"Divine Intervention"	Hideaki Fukui
2014	"Itsuka no, Ikutsuka no Kimi to no Sekai"	Hideaki Fukui
2014	"Kotonoha Breakdown"	Takashi Ōhashi
2014	"Machi wa Kanaderu"	Yohsuke Chiai
2014	"Hikari Mau Fuyu no Hi ni"	Ta-k
2014	"Hoshikuzu no Interlude"	Takayuki Kojima
2015	"Outside of Melancholy (Yūutsu no Mukōgawa)"	Takayuki Kojima
2015	"Lyrical Sentence"	Koji Aramaki
2015	"Wonder Stella"	Shin Okawa
2015	"Comet Lucifer (The Seed and the Sower)"	Katsuji Kondō
2016	"Niji o Ametara"	SQRT
2016	"What a Wonderful World Line"	Hideaki Fukui
2016	"Calling"	SQRT
2017	"Aozora no Rhapsody"	Daisuke Fujita
2017	"Moon River"	—N/a
2017	"Hello! My World!!"	—N/a
2018	"Watashi no Tame no Monogatari (My Uncompleted Story)"	—N/a
2021	"Nameless Color"	Hiroyuki Oumi
2021	"Ai no Supreme!"	Daisuke Fujita

=== Other album appearances ===
Year	Song	Album	Notes	Ref.
2013	"Que Sera Sera"	Uchōten Kazoku Original Soundtrack	TV-size version theme song to The Eccentric Family anime series.	
2013	"Tiny Lamp"	Gingitsune Original Soundtrack	TV-size version theme song to the Gingitsune anime series.	
2014	"Divine Intervention"	Witch Craft Works Original Soundtrack	TV-size version theme song to the Witch Craft Works anime series	
2014	"Itsuka no, Ikutsuka no Kimi to no Sekai"	Bokura wa Minna Kawai-Sō Original Soundtrack	TV-size version theme song to The Kawai Complex Guide to Manors and Hostel Behavior anime series	
2014	"Sonata to Interlude (Instrumental)" "Hoshi no Kakera" "Yakusoku no Nocturne (Acappella with Strings)" "Yakusoku no Nocturne" "Haru o Matte (Joyeux Noel!) (Acappella with Strings)" "Haru o Matte (Joyeux Noel!)" "Hoshikuzu no Interlude (Acappella with Strings)" "Sora no Method (Quote from Stardust Interlude)"	Sonata to Interlude	Image song album to the Celestial Method anime series	
