= List of Durarara!! chapters =

The cover of the first volume of the Durarara!! manga released by Square Enix

Durarara!! is a Japanese manga series written by Ryohgo Narita and illustrated by Akiyo Satorigi. Based on the light novel series of the same name, the series follows an eccentric group of citizens residing in Ikebukuro who form various connections through dealings with the local gangs – one of which is the "Dollars," a so-called invisible gang which no one seems to know much about. On top of all of this, the city is enraptured by the urban legend of the "Black Rider," the supposedly headless pilot of a black motorcycle.

The manga is serialized monthly in Square Enix's shōnen manga magazine Monthly GFantasy since May 2009. Yen Press licensed the manga series at San Diego Comic-Con 2011, and began releasing the series in English in North America in January 2012.

== Volume list ==
No.	Original release date	Original ISBN	English release date	English ISBN
01	December 26, 2009	978-4-7575-2765-2	January 24, 2012	978-0-3162-0490-3
1. "Wa!!" (ワ!!); 2. "Wawa!!" (ワワ!!); 3. "Wawawa!!" (ワワワ!!); 4. "Wawawawa!!" (ワワワワ!!); 5. "Wawawawawa!!" (ワワワワワ!!)
02	June 26, 2010	978-4-7575-2921-2	April 24, 2012	978-0-3162-0931-1
6. "Wawawawawawa!!" (ワワワワワワ!!); 7. "Wawawawawawawa!!" (ワワワワワワワ!!); 8. "Wawawawawawawawa!!" (ワワワワワワワワ!!); 9. "Wawawawawawawawawa!!" (ワワワワワワワワワ!!); 10. "Wawawawawawawawawawa!!" (ワワワワワワワワワワ!!); 11. "Wawawawawawawawawawawa!!" (ワワワワワワワワワワワ!!)
03	December 27, 2010	978-4-7575-3109-3	July 24, 2012	978-0-3162-0932-8
12. "Wawawawawawawawawawawawa!!" (ワワワワワワワワワワワワ!!); 13. "Wawawawawawawawawawawawawa!!" (ワワワワワワワワワワワワワ!!); 14. "Wawawawawawawawawawawawawawa!!" (ワワワワワワワワワワワワワワ!!); 15. "Wawawawawawawawawawawawawawawa!!" (ワワワワワワワワワワワワワワワ!!); 16. "Wawawawawawawawawawawawawawawawa!!" (ワワワワワワワワワワワワワワワワ!!); 17. "Wawawawawawawawawawawawawawawawawa!!" (ワワワワワワワワワワワワワワワワワ!!)
04	June 27, 2011	978-4-7575-3276-2	October 30, 2012	978-0-3162-0933-5
18. "Wawawawawawawawawawawawawawawawawawa!!" (ワワワワワワワワワワワワワワワワワワ!!); 19. "Wawawawawawawawawawawawawawawawawawawa!!" (ワワワワワワワワワワワワワワワワワワワ!!); 20. "Wawawawawawawawawawawawawawawawawawawawa!!" (ワワワワワワワワワワワワワワワワワワワワ!!); 21. "Wawawawawawawawawawawawawawawawawawawawawa!!" (ワワワワワワワワワワワワワワワワワワワワワ!!); final. "Wawawawawawawawawawawawawawawawawawawawawawa!!" (ワワワワワワワワワワワワワワワワワワワワワワ!!)

=== Saika Arc ===
No.	Original release date	Original ISBN	English release date	English ISBN
01	February 27, 2012	978-4-7575-3516-9	March 26, 2013	978-0-3162-4532-6
Chapter 1. Red Breath. Long Breath; Chapter 2. Demon Blade. Dog Meat; Chapter 3. Ikebukuro's Most Dangerous; Chapter 4. The Ikebukuro Calamity
02	September 10, 2012	978-4-7575-3711-8	May 28, 2013	978-0-3162-5094-8
Chapter 5. Heirloom Demon Blade; Chapter 6. Uncertain Girl; Chapter 7. Situation Homicidal; Chapter 8. Right to the Points; Chapter 9. Blade Flash, Red Shadow; Chapter 10. Calm. Serene. Insane.
03	March 27, 2013	978-4-7575-3930-3	January 21, 2014	978-0-3163-6901-5
Chapter 11. Brains, Beauty, Blade; Chapter 12. Sword and Stress; Chapter 13. Black and Blue and Blade All Over; Chapter 14. The Ecstasy of Violence; Chapter 15. Flawless, Unsanguine; final. The Blue Sky is Already... Dead?

=== Yellow Scarves Arc ===
No.	Original release date	Original ISBN	English release date	English ISBN
01	October 26, 2013	978-4-7575-4111-5	September 23, 2014	978-0-3163-3587-4
Chapter 1. I Love a Three-sided Standoff; Chapter 2. He's Back; Chapter 3. Stop Right There; Chapter 4. It's Nothing, Really; Chapter 5. Are You Psychic?
02	May 27, 2014	978-4-7575-4299-0	November 18, 2014	978-0-3163-3703-8
Chapter 6. I Would be Honored; Chapter 7. What Does This Mean?; Chapter 8. You Might Call it a Grim Reaper; Chapter 9. Are You Back?; Chapter 10. Welcome; Chapter 11. You Should Come Too
03	January 27, 2015	978-4-7575-4545-8	July 21, 2015	978-0-3163-0503-7
Chapter 12. The Location Of The Chocolate Is Still Unknown; Chapter 13. That's Kind Of A Shock; Chapter 14. Well Spotted; Chapter 15. That's Why I'm Here; Chapter 16. There's A Girl Waiting For Me; Final Chapter. He'll Come Back; Side Story 1. The Truth Of Durarara!! They Get Along; Side Story 2. The Truth of Durarara!! They Get Along 2

== See also ==
- List of Durarara!! episodes
