= List of Durarara!! episodes =

Durarara!! is a Japanese anime television series based on the light novel series of the same name, written by Ryōgo Narita and illustrated by Suzuhito Yasuda. An anime adaptation of the light novels was announced in the wraparound sleeve of the sixth volume of the light novel. The anime is produced by Brain's Base and started airing on January 8, 2010, on MBS, TBS, and CBC. The anime was simulcasted for English-speaking audiences within 24 hours of its Japanese premiere. The anime adapted the first three novels, and it was licensed by Beez Entertainment for European release; while at Anime Expo 2010, Aniplex of America confirmed that they have the license to Durarara!!, later producing an English dub for a January 2011 release. The English dub was produced at Bang Zoom! Entertainment. The music for the first season was composed by Makoto Yoshimori, who also wrote the music for Baccano!. The anime began its U.S. broadcast on Cartoon Network's Adult Swim programming block on June 26, 2011, and aired its last episode on December 18, 2011.

On March 15, 2014, a new TV anime series was announced, titled Durarara!!×2 (デュラララ!!×2). The main staff from the first series returned, though it was produced at studio Shuka instead of Brain's Base. It aired in three different cours, or quarters of a year. The cours are subtitled Shō (承; lit. 'Understanding'), Ten (転; lit. 'Motion'), and Ketsu (結; lit. 'Conclusion') respectively. The first cour began in January 2015, the second cour began in July 2015, and the third cour began in January 2016. Crunchyroll simulcasts the series in North America, Central America, South America, Ireland, and the United Kingdom. Aniplex of America licensed the series and is streaming an English dub via Crunchyroll, Funimation and Hulu.

== Series overview ==
Season	Episodes	Originally released	
Season	Episodes	First released	Last released
1	24	January 8, 2010	June 25, 2010
2	36	January 10, 2015	March 26, 2016

== Episode list ==
=== Season 1 (2010) ===
No.	Title	Directed by	Written by	Original release date	English air date
1	"Exit 1 / First Words (Opening)"; Transliteration: "Kaikōichiban" (Japanese: 開口一番)	Shinya Kawatsura	Noboru Takagi	January 8, 2010	June 26, 2011
2	"Highly Unpredictable"; Transliteration: "Ikkyoichijitsu" (Japanese: 一虚一実)	Makoto Baba	Noboru Takagi	January 15, 2010	July 3, 2011
3	"Rampant Evil"; Transliteration: "Chōryōbakko" (Japanese: 跳梁跋扈)	Yui Umemoto	Toshizō Nemoto	January 22, 2010	July 10, 2011
4	"Utterly Alone"; Transliteration: "Keieisōchō" (Japanese: 形影相弔)	Kazuhide Kondō	Noboru Takagi	January 29, 2010	July 17, 2011
5	"False Advertising"; Transliteration: "Yōtōkuniku" (Japanese: 羊頭狗肉)	Shinya Kawatsura	Sadayuki Murai	February 5, 2010	July 24, 2011
6	"Active Interest"; Transliteration: "Tōhonseisō" (Japanese: 東奔西走)	Yorihisa Koyata	Ai Ōta	February 12, 2010	July 31, 2011
7	"Bad-ass Dude"; Transliteration: "Kokushimusō" (Japanese: 国士無双)	Yūki Yase	Toshizō Nemoto	February 19, 2010	August 7, 2011
8	"Ephemeral Dream"; Transliteration: "Nankanoyume" (Japanese: 南柯之夢)	Tetsuo Ichimura	Aya Yoshinaga	February 26, 2010	August 14, 2011
9	"Love and Cherish"; Transliteration: "Iirenren" (Japanese: 依依恋恋)	Takashi Yamamoto	Aya Yoshinaga	March 5, 2010	August 21, 2011
10	"Never Before Seen"; Transliteration: "Kūzenzetsugo" (Japanese: 空前絶後)	Yui Umemoto	Ai Ōta	March 12, 2010	August 28, 2011
11	"Storm and Stress"; Transliteration: "Shippūdotō" (Japanese: 疾風怒濤)	Yorihisa Koyata	Toshizō Nemoto	March 19, 2010	September 4, 2011
12	"Yin and Yang"; Transliteration: "Umusōsei" (Japanese: 有無相生)	Shinya Kawatsura	Noboru Takagi	March 26, 2010	September 11, 2011
12.5	"Heaven's Vengeance"; Transliteration: "Tenmōkaikai" (Japanese: 天網恢恢)	Yui Umemoto	Sadayuki Murai	August 25, 2010 (DVD)	September 18, 2011
13	"Takes A Sudden Turn"; Transliteration: "Kyūtenchokka" (Japanese: 急転直下)	Yūki Yase	Toshizō Nemoto	April 9, 2010	September 25, 2011
14	"Turmoil Reigns"; Transliteration: "Butsujōsōzen" (Japanese: 物情騒然)	Mitsue Yamazaki	Ai Ōta	April 16, 2010	October 2, 2011
15	"Dumb Like a Fox"; Transliteration: "Gushaittoku" (Japanese: 愚者一得)	Yui Umemoto	Sadayuki Murai	April 23, 2010	October 9, 2011
16	"Mutual Love"; Transliteration: "Sōshisōai" (Japanese: 相思相愛)	Yorihisa Koyata	Aya Yoshinaga	April 30, 2010	October 16, 2011
17	"Everything Changes"; Transliteration: "Uitenpen" (Japanese: 有為転変)	Shinya Kawatsura	Toshizō Nemoto	May 7, 2010	October 23, 2011
18	"Out of Your Control"; Transliteration: "Shiseiyūmei" (Japanese: 死生有命)	Kiyoshi Matsuda	Noboru Takagi	May 14, 2010	October 30, 2011
19	"Anarchy"; Transliteration: "Sōtensudenishisu" (Japanese: 蒼天已死)	Yūki Yase	Ai Ōta	May 21, 2010	November 6, 2011
20	"A New King Will Arise"; Transliteration: "Kōtenmasanitatsu" (Japanese: 黄天當立)	Yukihiro Shino	Sadayuki Murai	May 28, 2010	November 13, 2011
21	"Everything Covered in Fog"; Transliteration: "Gorimuchū" (Japanese: 五里霧中)	Yui Umemoto	Toshizō Nemoto	June 4, 2010	November 20, 2011
22	"Declaration of Disbandment"; Transliteration: "Kaisansengen" (Japanese: 解散宣言)	Shinya Kawatsura	Aya Yoshinaga	June 11, 2010	November 27, 2011
23	"Complicated and Confused"; Transliteration: "Sensakubansō" (Japanese: 千錯万綜)	Yūki Yase	Noboru Takagi	June 18, 2010	December 4, 2011
24	"Selfless Devotion"; Transliteration: "Sokutenkyoshi" (Japanese: 則天去私)	Yorihisa Koyata	Noboru Takagi	June 25, 2010	December 11, 2011
24.5	"World at Peace (All's Right With The World)"; Transliteration: "Tenkataihei" (Japanese: 天下泰平)	Shinya Kawatsura	Toshizō Nemoto	February 23, 2011 (DVD)	December 18, 2011

=== Season 2: ×2 (2015–16) ===
No. overall	No. in season	Title	Directed by	Written by	Original release date
Shō (First cour)
25	1	"A Picture is Worth a Thousand Words"; Transliteration: "Hyakubun wa Ikken ni Shikazu" (Japanese: 百聞は一見に如かず)	Takahiro Omori	Noboru Takagi	January 10, 2015
26	2	"Harmony is the Greatest of Virtues"; Transliteration: "Wa o Motte Tōtoshito Nasu" (Japanese: 和を以て尊しと為す)	Eiji Suganuma	Noboru Takagi	January 17, 2015
27	3	"Adding Insult to Injury"; Transliteration: "Nakitsura ni Hachi" (Japanese: 泣き面に蜂)	Eiji Suganuma	Noboru Takagi	January 24, 2015
28	4	"When in Rome, Do as the Romans Do"; Transliteration: "Hito no Odoru Toki wa Odore" (Japanese: 人の踊るときは踊れ)	Eiji Suganuma; Yorihisa Koyata	Noboru Takagi	January 31, 2015
28.5	4.5	"My Heart is Like a Hot Pot"; Transliteration: "Watashi no Kokoro wa Nabe Moyou" (Japanese: 私の心は鍋模様)	Takahiro Ōmori	Noboru Takagi	May 30, 2015 (theater); July 22, 2015 (BD/DVD)
29	5	"No One Knows What the Future Holds"; Transliteration: "Issun Saki wa Yami" (Japanese: 一寸先は闇)	Mitsuhiro Yoneda	Toshizō Nemoto	February 7, 2015
30	6	"A Crow in the Dark Night"; Transliteration: "Yamiyo ni Karasu" (Japanese: 闇夜に烏)	Fumio Maezono	Aya Yoshinaga	February 14, 2015
31	7	"Moscow Does Not Believe in Tears"; Transliteration: "Mosukuwa wa Namida o Shinjinai" (Japanese: モスクワは涙を信じない)	Mitsuhiro Yoneda	Sadayuki Murai	February 21, 2015
32	8	"The Ladies' Man Has Neither Money Nor Power"; Transliteration: "Irootoko, Kane to Chikara wa Nakarikeri" (Japanese: 色男、金と力はなかりけり)	Osamu Sekita	Aya Yoshinaga	February 28, 2015
33	9	"The Day is Short, and the Way is Long"; Transliteration: "Hi Kurete Michi Tōshi" (Japanese: 日暮れて道遠し)	Noboru Takagi	Natsuko Kondō	March 7, 2015
34	10	"The Apple Doesn't Fall Far from the Tree"; Transliteration: "Kono Oya nishite Kono Ko Ari" (Japanese: この親にしてこの子あり)	Ho Pyeon-gang	Toshizō Nemoto	March 14, 2015
35	11	"No Use Crying over Spilt Milk"; Transliteration: "Fukusui Bon ni Kaerazu" (Japanese: 覆水盆に返らず)	Yūki Arie	Sadayuki Murai	March 21, 2015
36	12	"Adversity Makes a Man Wise"; Transliteration: "Kannan Nanji o Tama ni Su" (Japanese: 艱難汝を玉にす)	Yorihisa Koyata	Noboru Takagi	March 28, 2015
Ten (Second cour)
37	13	"Love Thy Enemy"; Transliteration: "Nanji no Teki o Aiseyo" (Japanese: 汝の敵を愛せよ)	Shinya Kawatsura	Sadayuki Murai	July 4, 2015
37.5	13.5	"Romanticist's Chaka-Poko"; Transliteration: "Onoroke Chakapoko" (Japanese: お惚気チャカポコ)	Takahiro Ōmori	Noboru Takagi	November 14, 2015 (theater); January 27, 2016 (BD/DVD)
38	14	"Life is but a Dream"; Transliteration: "Kantan no Yume" (Japanese: 邯鄲の夢)	Yūshi Ibe	Noboru Takagi	July 11, 2015
39	15	"Marriages are Made in Heaven"; Transliteration: "En wa Inamono, Ajinamono" (Japanese: 縁は異なもの, 味なもの)	Toshikatsu Tokoro	Katsumi Terasaki	July 18, 2015
40	16	"A Rumor Only Lasts Seventy-Five Days"; Transliteration: "Hito no Uwasa mo Shichi Juu Go Nichi" (Japanese: 人の噂も七十五日)	Yūki Arie	Toshizō Nemoto	July 25, 2015
41	17	"Asleep or Awake"; Transliteration: "Nete mo Samete mo" (Japanese: 寝ても覚めても)	Hisaya Takabayashi	Aya Yoshinaga	August 1, 2015
42	18	"Roses Have Thorns"; Transliteration: "Hana ni Arashi" (Japanese: 花に嵐)	Inuo Inukawa	Aya Yoshinaga	August 8, 2015
43	19	"A Cat Has Nine Lives"; Transliteration: "Neko wo Koroseba Nana Dai Tataru" (Japanese: 猫を殺せば七代祟る)	Ayako Kawano	Toshizō Nemoto	August 15, 2015
44	20	"Mouth of Honey, a Needle in the Heart"; Transliteration: "Kuchi ni Mitsu, Kokoro ni Hari" (Japanese: 口に蜜, 心に針)	Natsuko Kondō	Noboru Takagi	August 22, 2015
45	21	"Eloquent and Competent"; Transliteration: "Kuchi Hatcho Te Hatcho" (Japanese: 口八丁手八丁)	Takuma Suzuki	Noboru Takagi	August 29, 2015
46	22	"Blessed are the Foolish"; Transliteration: "Oroka Mono ni Fukuari" (Japanese: 愚か者に福あり)	Yoshiko Mikami	Sadayuki Murai	September 12, 2015
47	23	"Birds of a Feather"; Transliteration: "Onaji Ana no Mujina" (Japanese: 同じ穴の狢)	Daisuke Chiba	Katsumi Terasaki	September 19, 2015
48	24	"It Takes a Thief to Catch a Thief"; Transliteration: "Jya no Michi wa Hebi" (Japanese: 蛇の道は蛇)	Tomoko Hiramuki	Noboru Takagi	September 26, 2015
Ketsu (Third cour)
49	25	"Even a Chance Acquaintance is Decreed by Destiny"; Transliteration: "Sode Suriau mo Tashō no En" (Japanese: 袖すりあうも多生の縁)	Yūki Arie	Toshizō Nemoto	January 9, 2016
50	26	"Bell the Cat"; Transliteration: "Neko no Kubi ni Suzu" (Japanese: 猫の首に鈴)	Masayuki Kojima	Aya Yoshinaga	January 16, 2016
51	27	"All in the Same Boat"; Transliteration: "Doushuuai Sukuu" (Japanese: 同舟相救う)	Yoshihiro Mori	Sadayuki Murai	January 23, 2016
52	28	"Blood is Thicker Than Water"; Transliteration: "Chi wa Mizu yori mo Koshi" (Japanese: 血は水よりも濃し)	Takashi Kobayashi	Katsumi Terasaki	January 30, 2016
53	29	"Lost in the Dark"; Transliteration: "Yami ni Madou" (Japanese: 闇に惑う)	Yorihisa Koyata	Toshizō Nemoto	February 6, 2016
54	30	"In For a Penny, In For a Pound"; Transliteration: "Norikakatta Fune" (Japanese: 乗りかかった舟)	Yoshihiro Yanagiya	Aya Yoshinaga	February 13, 2016
55	31	"No Love Lost"; Transliteration: "Ken'en mo Tatanarazu" (Japanese: 犬猿もたたならず)	Masayuki Iimura	Sadayuki Murai	February 20, 2016
55.5	31.5	"Dufufufu!!"; Transliteration: "Dufufufu!!" (Japanese: デュフフフ!!)	Takahiro Ōmori	Noboru Takagi	May 21, 2016 (theater); July 27, 2016 (BD/DVD)
56	32	"A Tiger Dies and Leaves His Skin"; Transliteration: "Tora wa Shi shite Kawa no Nokosu" (Japanese: 虎は死してを皮を残す)	Tomoko Hiramuki	Noboru Takagi	February 27, 2016
57	33	"Walking on Thin Ice"; Transliteration: "Hakuhyō wo Fumu" (Japanese: 薄氷を踏む)	Hisaya Takabayashi	Noboru Takagi	March 5, 2016
58	34	"Telepathy"; Transliteration: "Ishin Denshin" (Japanese: 以心伝心)	Takahiro Majima	Noboru Takagi	March 12, 2016
59	35	"Life is an Unknown Course"; Transliteration: "Mizu no Nagare to Hito Gyōmatsu" (Japanese: 水の流れと人行末)	Tomoko Hiramuki	Noboru Takagi	March 19, 2016
60	36	"Those Who Meet Must Part"; Transliteration: "Au wa Wakare no Hajime" (Japanese: 会うは別れの始め)	Yorihisa Koyata; Miyuki Ōshiro; Takahiro Omori	Noboru Takagi	March 26, 2016
