= Hakata Tonkotsu Ramens =

Japanese light novel series

- Novel first volume cover

博多豚骨ラーメンズ (Hakata Tonkotsu Rāmenzu)
- Novel series
- Written by: Chiaki Kisaki
- Illustrated by: Hako Ichiiro
- Published by: ASCII Media Works
- Imprint: Media Works Bunko
- Original run: February 25, 2014 – May 24, 2024
- Volumes: 14 + 1
- Manga
- Written by: Chiaki Kisaki
- Illustrated by: Kisara Akino
- Published by: Square Enix
- Magazine: Monthly GFantasy
- Original run: July 2016 – May 2017
- Volumes: 2
- Light novel

Durarara!! × Hakata Tonkotsu Ramens
- Written by: Chiaki Kizaki
- Illustrated by: Hako Ichiiro
- Published by: ASCII Media Works
- Imprint: Dengeki Bunko
- Published: October 8, 2016
- Manga

Hakata Tonkotsu Ramens Dai 2-Shō
- Written by: Chiaki Kisaki
- Illustrated by: Chiako Nagaoka
- Published by: Square Enix
- Magazine: Monthly G Fantasy
- Original run: August 2017 – December 2018
- Volumes: 2
- Anime television series
- Directed by: Kenji Yasuda
- Produced by: Takema Okamura; Tomoyuki Ōwada; Noritomo Isogai; Hirotaka Kaneko; Masaru Seto; Fumihiro Ozawa; Noriko Dohi; Mika Endō
- Written by: Shōgo Yasukawa
- Music by: Kōtarō Nakagawa
- Studio: Satelight
- Licensed by: Crunchyroll (worldwide outside of Asia): SEA: Muse Communication
- Original network: AT-X, Tokyo MX, BS11, TVQ
- English network: SEA: Animax Asia
- Original run: January 12, 2018 – March 30, 2018
- Episodes: 12

Hakata Tonkotsu Ramens (Japanese: 博多豚骨ラーメンズ, Hepburn: Hakata Tonkotsu Rāmenzu) is a Japanese novel series written by Chiaki Kisaki and illustrated by Hako Ichiiro. ASCII Media Works published fourteen volumes from 2014 to 2024 under their Media Works Bunko imprint. The novel won the Grand Prize at the 20th annual Dengeki Novel Awards.

A manga adaptation with art by Kisara Akino was serialized in Square Enix's shōnen manga magazine Monthly GFantasy between July 2016 and May 2017. It was collected in two tankōbon volumes. A second manga adaptation, titled Hakata Tonkotsu Ramens Dai 2-Shō, with art by Chiako Nagaoka, was launched on August 18, 2017, in the same magazine. It was collected in two tankōbon volumes.

An anime television series adaptation by Satelight aired from January 12 to March 30, 2018.

== Plot ==
Set in the city of Fukuoka, particularly the Hakata district, a place where crime and the underworld thrive beneath the surface of ordinary urban life. The story follows Zenji Banba, a private investigator who specializes in tracking down missing persons, and Lin Xianming, a professional assassin who operates under the guise of a food stall owner. The city is home to numerous underground professionals, including killers, informants, and specialists who coexist in a fragile balance.

As Banba and Lin cross paths, they become caught up in a deadly game between rival assassins, including the mysterious hitman Saeki, and powerful criminal organizations vying for control of Fukuoka's underworld. Their investigation uncovers a network of corrupt officials and criminal masterminds who manipulate killings for profit, while also revealing Lin's complicated past and Banba's connection to unsolved cases. Together with allies, they navigate assassination plots and double-crosses, often forced to cooperate with former enemies to survive.

== Characters ==
Characters from Hakata Tonkotsu Ramens. From left to right: Genzō Gohda, Enokida, Yamato, Saeki, José Martínez, Shigematsu, Saitoh, Lin Xianming, Zenji Banba, Jiro, and Misaki.

Zenji Banba (馬場 善治, Banba Zenji)
Voiced by: Daisuke Ono (Japanese); Josh Grelle (English)
A detective who runs his own agency called the Banba Detective Office. Born and raised in Hakata, he loves Tonkotsu ramen, Mentaiko, and baseball. He is also the identity of the famous assassin known as The Niwaka Samurai.
Lin Xianming (林 憲明, Rin Shenmin)
Voiced by: Yuki Kaji (Japanese); Daman Mills (English)
A crossdressing hitman from Kunming, China. He is skilled with the knife. He came to Japan to look for his sister and to pay off a large debt incurred by his family. After finding out his sister was murdered by the very agency he worked for, he teamed up with Banba to kill them and joins him afterwards. His real name is Maomei, and he sold himself to help his family's poor financial situation. He would undergo brutal training to become an assassin for five years with the help of his roommate Feilang, who ended up betraying him during the final exam.
Kazuki Saitō (斉藤 和樹, Saitō Kazuki)
Voiced by: Yūsuke Kobayashi (Japanese); Stephen Fu (English)
A former baseball player who was kicked off the team for severely injuring a fellow player during a pitch. He becomes a contractor for Murder Inc. He is a new employee having recently moved from Tokyo to Hakata.
Enokida (榎田)
Voiced by: Kenshō Ono (Japanese); Kyle Igneczi (English)
A skilled computer hacker who runs an information shop. He and Banba have a longstanding working relationship. He uses mechanical spiders as tracking devices to discreetly pick up information. His real name is Chihiro Matsuda (松田 千尋) and he is the son of Kazuo Matsuda, a member of Japan's House of Representatives. He was caught hacking and his father ordered his butler Yagi fake his death by sending him away to Hakata to allow him to live freely. He would dye his hair and assume the name of Enokida to cover his true identity.
Jirō (ジロー)
Voiced by: Daisuke Namikawa (Japanese); Aaron Roberts (English)
A former hairdresser who runs his own hitman agency. He moved to Hakata after his lover was murdered to start his own agency, and has been Misaki's caretaker.
Misaki (ミサキ)
Voiced by: Aoi Yūki (Japanese); Amber Lee Connors (English)
An elementary school student who assists Jiro in running his agency.
José Martínez (ホセ・マルティネス, Hose Marutinesu)
Voiced by: Tomoaki Maeno (Japanese); Marcus D. Stimac (English)
A torturer who immigrated from the Dominican Republic.
Yamato (大和)
Voiced by: Yoshitsugu Matsuoka (Japanese); Eric Vale (English)
A host who works for the club Adam.
Saeki (佐伯)
Voiced by: Daisuke Hirakawa
Director of a cosmetic surgery clinic.
Shigematsu (重松)
Voiced by: Kenji Hamada (Japanese); Ben Phillips (English)
A veteran detective who has a great working relationship with Banba. He investigates incidents that are not judged by the law.
Genzō Gohda (剛田 源造, Gōda Genzō)
Voiced by: Kōsei Hirota
A chef who works at a ramen stand that Banba frequently dines at. He is a former hitman nicknamed G.G (Ji-Ji) who was the strongest in Hakata.
Shunsuke Saruwatari (猿渡 俊助, Saruwatari Shunsuke)
Voiced by: Yuichi Nakamura
A hitman who formerly worked for Murder Inc. He is a submarine-style pitcher for a rival baseball team and he fights by throwing shurikens and other projectiles in the same manner. He was ace of Murder Inc, but he left Murder Inc and return to Kitakyushu where is his home. because he was fed up with the boring assignments he keeps on getting and want to fight a stronger opponent. With his new employer, he is assigned to kill the Nikawa Samurai and is determined to do it on his own terms. As such, he develops a rivalry with Banba and will help him out when he is threatened not wanting anybody else to kill him.
Naoya Nitta (新田 巨也, Nitta Naoya)
Voiced by: Masaya Matsukaze (Japanese); Shawn Gann (English)
A consultant who investigates child murders in Kitakyushu. He used to play baseball as Saruwatari's catcher, and as such he has a close relationship with him.
Chegaru (チェガル)
Voiced by: Kenjiro Tsuda (Japanese); Chris Wehkamp (English)
Siva (シヴァ, Shiba)
Voiced by: Natsuki Hanae (Japanese); Justin Briner (English)
Irasawa (井良沢)
Voiced by: Atsushi Imaruoka (Japanese); Ricco Fajardo (English)
Feilang (緋狼)
Voiced by: Nobunaga Shimazaki (Japanese); Alejandro Saab (English)
A hitman from Beijing who was Lin's training partner. He provided emotional support for Lin while at the assassin training grounds in China. However, he ends up betraying him at the final exam where the two had to fight to the death when he revealed that he killed his previous roommate. Lin apparently killed him to pass the exam, but he survived and has since made a living as a hitman in Beijing.

== Media ==
=== Novel ===
The series consists of 14 volumes and 1 short story collection. After the series finished on May 24, 2024, a set of all 15 volumes combined was released on February 25, 2025.

No.	Release date	ISBN
1	February 25, 2014	978-4-04-866316-8
2	September 25, 2014	978-4-04-869009-6
3	March 25, 2015	978-4-04-865063-2
4	August 25, 2015	978-4-04-865387-9
5	December 25, 2015	978-4-04-865677-1
6	March 25, 2017	978-4-04-892832-8
7	July 25, 2017	978-4-04-893290-5
8	December 22, 2017	978-4-04-893589-0
EG	March 23, 2018	978-4-04-893694-1
9	February 22, 2020	978-4-04-913085-0
10	February 25, 2021	978-4-04-913642-5
11	February 25, 2022	978-4-04-914235-8
12	February 25, 2023	978-4-04-914891-6
13	April 25, 2024	978-4-04-915741-3
14	May 24, 2024	978-4-04-915742-0

=== Light novel ===
==== Durarara!! × Hakata Tonkotsu Ramens ====
No.	Release date	ISBN
1	October 8, 2016	978-4-04-892406-1

=== Manga ===
No.	Release date	ISBN
1	March 25, 2017	978-4-7575-5231-9
2	July 25, 2017	978-4-7575-5429-0

=== Hakata Tonkotsu Ramens Dai 2-Shō ===
No.	Release date	ISBN
1	January 27, 2018	978-4-7575-5609-6
2	December 27, 2018	978-4-7575-5967-7

=== Anime ===
An anime television series adaptation by Satelight aired from January 12 to March 30, 2018, as part of Dengeki's 25th anniversary. The opening theme is "Stray" (ストレイ, Sutorei), performed by Kishida Kyoudan & The Akeboshi Rockets, while the ending theme is "Dirty Bullet" performed by the jazz band TRI4TH. Crunchyroll simulcasted the series, while Funimation produced an English dub.

On June 18, 2020, the show was aired via Animax Asia on July 1. The show is streamed throughout India under Muse India.

The show receive a release in Japan via Blu-Ray and DVD with Volume 1 released on April 27, 2018. Volume 2 was released on May 30, 2018. Volume 3 was released on July 11, 2018. Funimation released the entire series on Blu-Ray and DVD on March 5, 2019.

No.	Title (Note: All English titles are taken from Crunchyroll.)	Original release date
1	"Play Ball"; Transliteration: "Purei bōru" (Japanese: プレイボール)	January 12, 2018
Saitō, a new employee of Murder Inc, is transferred to Hakata, a fierce battlefield for hitman. At the same time, private detective Zenji Banba, who is asked by detective Shigematsu to investigate a detective's suicide case, receives the photo left by Shigematsu. There is a current mayor with rumors of his involvement in many cases. Banba immediately visits Enokida, an informant, to seek information about the mayor's photo. Meanwhile, Lin Xianming, a crossdressing hitman hired by a dark organization, demands payment from his organization's chairman because his target, a detective, had committed suicide before he killed him, but the chairman refused. Knowing that Lin was desperate for money, he gave Banba's business card to him and ordered him to be killed.
2	"Irregular"; Transliteration: "Iregyurā" (Japanese: イレギュラー)	January 19, 2018
Lin sneaks into Banba's detective office and protects him from the other dark organization's hitman. Banba finds out that Lin had a family debt problem, so he pays off Lin's debt so he won't have to be a hitman anymore. Meanwhile, Saitō, assigned by Murder Inc to kill a student, is kidnapped by a vengeful man named Jirō and his partner, Misaki. However, Jirō and his fellow torturer, José Martínez, think that Saitō is the student, until Saitō reveals his own identity and job so he is able to clear up the misunderstanding. After that, Saitō suddenly gets a big compensation for killing a student so he is having fun at night in Hakata and gets drunk. However, when a drunk Saitō wakes up in a hotel room, a strange woman's corpse lies next to Saitō.
3	"Teamwork"; Transliteration: "Chīmuwāku" (Japanese: チームワーク)	January 26, 2018
Saitō realizes that he has been accused of murder and calls Jirō for help in seeking revenge against the real suspect. At the same time, Lin, intent on paying off his family's debt, receives the news from his organization's chairman that his younger sister, who had left her hometown, was killed at the hotel in Hakata. Lin is angry and kills all members of his own dark organization, but the chairman escapes and Lin is seriously injured when he is suddenly stabbed by another hitman hired by the chairman. Banba finds Lin through Enokida's tracking device attaches to Lin's clothes and offers to help find the criminal who kills his younger sister.
4	"Ninth Inning, Two Outs"; Transliteration: "9 kai ura tsūauto" (Japanese: 9回裏ツーアウト)	February 2, 2018
Thanks to Enokida's information, Banba learns that the criminal who kills Lin's younger sister was Yusuke Harada, the mayor's son of Hakata. Banba and Lin, who gets information about the girl's next purchase transaction, prepare a strategy. Lin sneaks in disguise as a girl for sale and tries to find Harada, but his strategy doesn't work because he is already in the hand of his own organization's chairman. Banba is horribly killed by "Niwaka Samurai". When Lin is surrendered, Niwaka Samurai turns around to kill all members of the organization including the chairman and frees Lin. Lin then learns that the Niwaka Samurai is Zenji Banba and he fakes his death thanks to Jirō and a surgeon called Saeki. Banba and Lin, together with Jirō and Saitō, manage to catch Harada and the mayor's subordinate, who is able to fake people's deaths, then publicize Harada's crimes throughout Hakata citizens by Enokida.
5	"Tryouts"; Transliteration: "Torai auto" (Japanese: トライアウト)	February 9, 2018
Yamakasa Festival, one of the three major festivals in Hakata, is coming. Banba, born and raised in Hakata, will be taking a break from his detective work because of this festival so Lin replaces Banba's job. Lin carries out his duties without disturbing Banba, including when Saitō is about to be killed by his own partner from Murder Inc. At that time, Shunsuke Saruwatari, a hitman of the Tokyo branch of Murder Inc, is bored with a mediocre job so he quits from Murder Inc and goes to Hakata, a fierce battlefield for hitman. Upon arriving in Hakata, Saruwatari meets Naoya Nitta, a former colleague when he was in high school. Nitta is an assassin consultant, but he buys things that Saruwatari usually uses to kill. Nitta invites Saruwatari to kill Niwaka Samurai, then Saruwatari feels challenged to kill him.
6	"Pinch Hitter"; Transliteration: "Pinchi hittā" (Japanese: ピンチヒッター)	February 16, 2018
A duel between Niwaka Samurai and Saruwatari, ensues, but Lin disguises himself as Niwaka Samurai and accepts Saruwatari's challenge. The fight is still going until Lin is cornered. Right then, Zenji Banba rushes to the duel when he learns that Lin has accepted the job of a samurai and is fighting as Niwaka Samurai against Saruwatari. Saruwatari, who fights against the real Niwaka Samurai, manages to uncover the identity of Niwaka Samurai, but he is cornered and fell. Niwaka Samurai helps Saruwatari and considers the result of the fight a draw.
7	"Lead-off Hitter"; Transliteration: "Rīdo ofu man" (Japanese: リードオフマン)	February 23, 2018
Information is the second important thing after money. A cyberterrorist organization has purged the truth-seeking hackers who endangered his organization. Meanwhile, a man looking for a missing boy comes to Banba's detective office with a boy's photo. The photo given to find a boy who went missing eight years ago points to Enokida. Just then, Enokida comes to Banba's office and a man looking for him is his family's butler and former assassin, Yagi. Yagi enlists Enokida's help to find the person who hacked the computer and threatened Enokida's father. Elsewhere, a cyberterrorist organization learns of Enokida's identity and plans to kill him.
8	"Trick Play"; Transliteration: "Torikku purei" (Japanese: トリックプレイ)	March 2, 2018
Enokida is the target of a "hacker hunt" and wanders around the city of Hakata. Enokida is targeted by hitman who are caught with prize money and rescued by Banba and Lin, while Enokida's only weapon, his personal laptop, is also hacked by a cyberterrorist organization. Enokida hatches a final plan to trick the organization by enlisting Lin Xianming's help to disguise him as Enokida and meet at a restaurant, while Banba and his best friend, Yamato, are behind them. A member of the organization kidnaps an undercover Lin when the restaurant's power goes out and beats him to death, but Lin is able to resist and is injured. Banba and Enokida arrives because of the tracking device on Lin Xianming's shirt, then Enokida hacks electronic equipment to reveal all members of the cyberterrorist organization.
9	"Hit and Run"; Transliteration: "Endo ran" (Japanese: エンドラン)	March 9, 2018
"Hakata Tonkotsu Ramens" baseball team, consisting of Banba, Lin, Enokida, Jirō, Misaki, Saitō, Yamato, Martínez, Saeki, Shigematsu and Genzō Goda, plays as usual. Lin is comfortable with their friendship and friendliness, but he is uncomfortable that his daily life will not last forever. Lin recalls his past when he sold himself for paying of his very poor family's debt and trained hard as a hitman. He also found his first friend called Feilang and promised to pass the final exam together as a hitman. But during the final exam, Feilang betrayed Lin until Lin killed him. Lin doesn't realize that Feilang is still alive and doing a job as a hitman in Beijing.
10	"Shortstop"; Transliteration: "Shōto sutoppu" (Japanese: ショートストップ(遊撃手))	March 16, 2018
Banba and his friends decides to exterminate the remaining top brass of Kakyuu organization in Fukuoka. Meanwhile, Nitta is in talks with Seungwan organization which aims to expand to Japan. The business opportunity makes Saruwatari a hitman exclusive for Seungwan organization. Elsewhere, the Kakyuu organization hires Feilang from Beijing to kill the top brass of Seungwan organization and Feilang demands Lin's presence in return. Lin decides to leave Banba's office because he is afraid of being betrayed by Banba like Feilang betrayed him, but instead he runs into Enokida. When Enokida investigates a murder case at a convenience store, Lin is shocked to see Feilang still alive. Elsewhere, Feilang brutally kills all members of Seungwan's organization, then Saruwatari comes to confront Feilang.
11	"Brawl"; Transliteration: "Rantō" (Japanese: 乱闘)	March 23, 2018
The revenge against Lin has been started by Feilang hired by Kakyuu organization. Saruwatari, the first target, fights against Feilang but he suddenly fails. At that time, Lin, who leaves Banba, is hiding in the internet cafe with Enokida, but Enokida has informed his friends of Lin's whereabouts except Banba. Saitō is the last people to come to the internet cafe to meet Lin. Shigematsu asks Enokida, Saitō and Lin about the "Noriaki Hayashi Murder Case", in which two men with the same kanji as Lin in Fukuoka have been killed. Realizing that the murder message is directed at him, Lin asks Enokida the address of the surviving Noriaki Hayashi in Fukuoka and rushes to meet Feilang to escape the past.
12	"Walk-Off Home Run"; Transliteration: "Sayonara hōmu ran" (Japanese: サヨナラホームラン)	March 30, 2018
Lin meets Feilang to confront his past and refuses Feilang's invitation to cooperate. He fights Feilang, but he starts to get cornered by his own doubts and runs away from Feilang. Banba, who rushes to the place to help Lin, is attacked by Feilang and they are captured. Meanwhile, Enokida and his friends come to a ramen shop owned by Genzō Gōda, a former hitman called G.G, and plan to help Banba and Lin. That night, Banba and Lin are locked up in the tiger cage at the headquarter of Kakyuu organization, then Feilang orders them to kill each other, but Banba has a ridiculous plan with the help of Gōda and his friends so all members of Kakyuu organization are killed, while Feilang is injured and fled. Lin chases and kills Feilang. The next morning, Lin joined Banba and their friends, then they plays baseball against Saruwatari's baseball team.

=== Stage play ===
A stage play adaptation premiered from July 13 to July 21, 2019.

== Reception ==
=== Previews ===
The anime adaptation's first episode garnered mixed reviews from Anime News Network's staff during the Winter 2018 season previews. Chris Farris solely reviewed the English dub version of the episode, criticizing the premise for lacking "punch and personality" to sell itself and felt the voice actors were "monotone" and weren't "distinct" enough with their performances (singling out Daman Mills' portrayal of Xianming as a standout), concluding that: "Ultimately, listening to this paradox just creates a feeling of surreal blandness." James Beckett found it to be a "dour premiere" that's "decent-looking" but lacks ambition and excitement to deliver its hitmen ensemble and their various storylines throughout the overall plot. Lynzee Loveridge found the production "middle of the road" but commended the crossdressing character of Xianming and was intrigued by the "interwoven threads" and "interlocking relationships" throughout the overall mystery. Jacob Chapman commended the handling of the Ryōgo Narita-like "multitudinous subplots" that connect with each other but was critical of the serious tone clashing with the ridiculous setup, the cast of "blasé and unlikable characters" and the production having a "mediocre art design" and "stiff animation", concluding that: "Hakata Tonkotsu Ramens isn't a traditionally terrible show, but I don't think its lukewarm stabs at uniqueness made it any less of a slog to get through either."

Rebecca Silverman wrote that: "With a jazz-based soundtrack and a casual feeling about it, Hakata Tonkotsu Ramens stands to be an interesting puzzle to piece together. It's definitely going to be worth figuring out where it's headed, because there are a few directions it could take as of now." Nick Creamer was critical of the mediocre aesthetic quality throughout the art and character designs, but gave praise to the natural transitions between characters and subplots, saying "[I]f you're looking for a convoluted crime drama, you could certainly do a lot worse." Theron Martin praised director Kenji Yasuda for handling the concept by having a "well-organized" plot and an ensemble cast that gets equal attention and sets up various scenarios between them, calling it "one of the season's sharper new entries so far."

=== Series ===
Martin reviewed the complete anime series and gave it a B+ grade. While giving note of some "distasteful story elements" and a lack of female representation in its ensemble, he praised the charm of its cast and their interactions with each other throughout the series and the production's "distinctive aesthetic" that gives them their visual appeal, concluding that: "If you can handle its graphic content, then Hakata Tonkotsu Ramens is a highly entertaining series that may have been overlooked during the Winter 2018 season, but is well worth checking out for fans of its unique sub-genre." Allen Moody, writing for THEM Anime Reviews, praised the series for its "nicely complex" and "elaborately conceived" ensemble cast and their various stories being "very well paced" and having a "moral framework" to them, concluding that he would like a continuation with more focus on Lin and Banba's entourage. Silverman reviewed the home video release in 2019 and gave it an overall B grade. She praised Lin's character development during the first and last arcs, the use of language and the balancing of both humor and dark elements, but was critical of how the show treats its female characters and the rest of the cast being just "one-note" quirky personalities, concluding that: "Although it can feel a bit uneven over the course of its four story arcs, Hakata Tonkotsu Ramens is a fun show overall."

== See also ==
- Bride of the Death God, a manga series written and illustrated by Hako Ichiiro
