= Bride of the Death God =

Japanese manga series

- First tankōbon volume cover

死神の花嫁－余命7日からの幸福－ (Shinigami no Hanayome: Yomei Nanoka kara no Kōfuku)
- Genre: Dark fantasy; Romance; Supernatural
- Manga
- Written by: Hako Ichiiro
- Published by: Square Enix
- English publisher: NA: Square Enix Manga & Books
- Imprint: Gangan Comics Pixiv
- Magazine: Gangan Pixiv
- Original run: December 17, 2022 – present
- Volumes: 3
- icon

Bride of the Death God (死神の花嫁－余命7日からの幸福－, Shinigami no Hanayome: Yomei Nanoka kara no Kōfuku) is a Japanese manga series written and illustrated by Hako Ichiiro. It initially began publication on the author's Twitter account in March 2022. It was later acquired by Square Enix who began serializing it on the Pixiv Comic website under their Gangan Pixiv brand in December 2022.

== Synopsis ==
The series is centered around the relationship between a death god and a sickly girl with an incurable disease named Aibi. A death god appears before Aibi telling her that she will die in seven days. The death god expected her to cry upon hearing that, instead she smiled at him and thanked him for telling her that. This leads to the death god visiting her every day until she passes.

== Publication ==
Written and illustrated by Hako Ichiiro, Bride of the Death God initially began publication as a webcomic on the author's Twitter account on March 5, 2022. It was later acquired by Square Enix who began serializing it on the Pixiv Comic website under their Gangan Pixiv brand on December 17, 2022. Its chapters have been compiled into three tankōbon volumes as of September 2024.

The series' chapters are published in English on Square Enix's Manga Up! Global website and app. During their panel at New York Comic Con 2024, Square Enix Manga & Books announced that they had licensed the series for English publication.

No.	Original release date	Original ISBN	North American release date	North American ISBN
1	December 21, 2022	978-4-7575-8318-4	September 9, 2025	978-1-64609-400-4
Chapters 1–5
2	November 21, 2023	978-4-7575-8910-0	January 13, 2026	978-1-64609-401-1
Chapters 6–10
3	September 21, 2024	978-4-7575-9432-6	May 12, 2026	978-1-64609-402-8
Chapters 11–14

== See also ==
- Hakata Tonkotsu Ramens, a novel series also illustrated by Hako Ichiiro
