= Durarara!! (manga) =

Japanese manga series

- First volume cover

デュラララ!!
- Genre: Action; Suspense; Urban fantasy
- Manga
- Written by: Ryohgo Narita
- Illustrated by: Akiyo Satorigi (vol. 1–10); Aogiri (vol. 11–)
- Published by: Square Enix
- English publisher: NA: Yen Press
- Magazine: Monthly GFantasy
- Original run: June 18, 2009 – present
- Volumes: 18
- icon

Durarara!! (デュラララ!!) is a Japanese manga series based on Ryohgo Narita's light novel series Durarara!!. It is illustrated by Akiyo Satorigi (first three arcs) and Aogiri (fourth arc). It has been serialized in Square Enix's shōnen manga magazine Monthly GFantasy since June 2009.

== Story ==
Mikado Ryūgamine, a shy teenager enrolls at the private Raira Academy in Tokyo's Ikebukuro district at the invitation of his childhood friend Masaomi Kida. While being shown around Ikebukuro by Masaomi, Mikado witnesses the legendary and ominous "Black Rider" —a supernatural urban myth. Contrary to typical reactions, Mikado finds himself exhilarated by this encounter with the extraordinary, reflecting his latent yearning for a life beyond the ordinary.

== Publication ==
The Durarara!! manga, adaptation of Ryohgo Narita's light novel series of the same name, has been serialized in Square Enix's shōnen manga magazine Monthly GFantasy. Its first three arcs were illustrated by Akiyo Satorigi and the fourth arc is illustrated by Aogiri. The series' first arc ran from June 18, 2009, to April 18, 2011. The second arc, the "Saika Arc" (罪歌編, Saika-hen), ran from September 17, 2011, to January 18, 2013. The series' third arc, the "Yellow Scarves Arc" (黄巾賊編, Kokinzoku-hen), ran from April 18, 2013, to October 18, 2014. The series' fourth arc, the "Re;Dollars Arc" (RE;ダラーズ編, RE; Darāzu-hen), began on November 18, 2014.

Square Enix has collected the chapters into individual tankōbon volumes; the first arc has four volumes, released from December 26, 2009, to June 27, 2011; the second arc has three volumes, released from February 27, 2012, to March 27, 2013; the third arc has three volumes, released from October 26, 2013, to January 27, 2015. The fourth arc's first volume was released on July 10, 2015, and eight volumes have been released as of August 26, 2022.

In North America, the manga is licensed for English release by Yen Press; the first arc release was announced in July 2011; the second arc release was announced in August 2012, the third arc was announced in 2014; the fourth arc was announced in October 2015. Square Enix started publishing the manga in English on its Manga Up! global service in May 2023.

== Reception ==
Carlo Santos of Anime News Network praised the first volume for its characters, its tonal shifts between genres—including slice-of-life, action thriller, and psychological—and its stylish, sharp-lined artwork. However, he criticized a perceived lack of narrative focus, which he felt could leave readers uncertain of the series' direction. Despite this, Santos regarded the work as highly original and awarded it an A−, concluding that the unpredictable ride was part of its appeal.

In his review, Chris Kirby of The Fandom Post found the manga easier to follow than its anime adaptation, noting that the reader-controlled pace enhanced enjoyment. He described the first volume as a top-notch introduction and expressed anticipation for the development of a more defined plot in subsequent volumes.

Danica Davidson of Otaku USA acknowledged that the narrative was initially challenging due to its many mysteries and disconnected characters, but affirmed that the series had many positive qualities. David Gromer of Graphic Novel Reporter recommended the series to fans of stories that begin ordinarily and gradually evolve into the extraordinary.
