= Durarara!! =

Japanese light novel series

- Cover of the first light novel

デュラララ!!
- Genre: Action; Suspense; Urban fantasy
- Light novel
- Written by: Ryōgo Narita
- Illustrated by: Suzuhito Yasuda
- Published by: ASCII Media Works
- English publisher: NA: Yen Press
- Imprint: Dengeki Bunko
- Original run: April 25, 2004 – January 10, 2014
- Volumes: 13 + side story
Further information
Anime television series
Directed by	Takahiro Omori
Produced by	Akeko Yokoyama; Atsushi Wada; Hiro Maruyama; Kozue Kaneniwa; Yasuyo Ogisu
Written by	Noboru Takagi
Music by	Makoto Yoshimori
Studio	Brain's Base
Licensed by	AUS: Siren Visual; NA: Aniplex of America; UK: Anime Limited
Original network	MBS, TBS, CBC
English network	UK: Viceland; US: Adult Swim
Original run	January 8, 2010 – June 25, 2010
Episodes	24 + 2 OVA
Manga
Durarara!! 3way standoff -alley-
Written by	Ryohgo Narita
Illustrated by	Izuko Fujiya
Published by	ASCII Media Works
Magazine	Sylph
Original run	July 22, 2013 – August 22, 2014
Volumes	2
Manga
YZQ ✕ DRRR!!
Written by	Suzuhito Yasuda
Published by	Kodansha
Imprint	Sirius KC
Published	December 18, 2013
Light novel
Durarara!! SH
Written by	Ryohgo Narita
Illustrated by	Suzuhito Yasuda
Published by	ASCII Media Works
English publisher	NA: Yen Press
Imprint	Dengeki Bunko
Original run	April 10, 2014 – present
Volumes	4
Manga
Durarara!! Relay
Written by	Ryohgo Narita
Illustrated by	Izuko Fujiya
Published by	ASCII Media Works
Magazine	Sylph
Original run	October 22, 2014 – November 21, 2015
Volumes	2
Anime television series
Durarara!!×2
Directed by	Takahiro Omori
Written by	Noboru Takagi
Music by	Makoto Yoshimori
Studio	Shuka
Licensed by	AUS: Siren Visual; NA: Aniplex of America; UK: Anime Limited
Original network	Tokyo MX, GTV, GYT, BS11, MBS, CBC
English network	SEA: Animax
Original run	January 10, 2015 – March 26, 2016
Episodes	36 + 3 OVA
Light novel
Orihara Izaya to, Yūyake o
Written by	Ryohgo Narita
Illustrated by	Suzuhito Yasuda
Published by	ASCII Media Works
Imprint	Dengeki Bunko
Original run	July 10, 2015 – October 8, 2016
Volumes	2
Light novel
Durarara!! × Hakata Tonkotsu Ramens
Written by	Chiaki Kizaki
Illustrated by	Hako Ichiiro
Published by	ASCII Media Works
Imprint	Dengeki Bunko
Published	October 8, 2016
Related
Manga adaptation (2009–present)
- icon

Durarara!! (デュラララ!!), shortened to DRRR!! in some official materials, is a Japanese light novel series written by Ryohgo Narita, with illustrations by Suzuhito Yasuda. Durarara!! tells the story of a dullahan working as an underworld courier in Ikebukuro, an internet-based anonymous gang called the Dollars, and the chaos that unfolds around the most dangerous people in Ikebukuro. The series ran for thirteen volumes, published by ASCII Media Works under their Dengeki Bunko imprint. A sequel series, titled Durarara!! SH set two years after the events of the original series, started in 2014.

A manga adaptation of the same name, first illustrated by Akiyo Satorigi and later by Aogiri, has been serialized in Square Enix's shōnen manga magazine Monthly GFantasy since July 2009. A 24-episode anime television series adaptation was broadcast from January to June 2010. It was followed by a 36-episode second season, titled Durarara!!×2, broadcast from January 2015 to March 2016.

== Plot ==
Mikado Ryūgamine, a young boy who longs for the exciting life of the big city, moves to Ikebukuro to attend Raira Academy with his childhood friend Masaomi Kida, whom he has not seen since he was young. After the two meet at the train station, they set out to explore the streets of Ikebukuro. Masaomi warns Mikado about people he does not want to cross in the city such as the violent and superhumanly strong man Shizuo Heiwajima, the information broker Izaya Orihara, and the mysterious gang known as "The Dollars". After running into some of the side characters, Mikado sees a local legend called the "Black Rider" who is rumored to have no head and rides around Ikebukuro on a black motorcycle that occasionally neighs like a horse. The "Black Rider"'s real name is Celty Sturluson; she is a creature from Irish folklore known as a dullahan who is in Ikebukuro looking for her stolen head while working as an underworld courier. The narrative follows all of the characters equally, showing how their lives intersect and create a greater plot line from each character's knowledge about a common incident.

The story is told from the perspective of approximately eleven of the main characters, with the perspective changing in every episode in the anime, sometimes even more often. One of the few constants given in every episode is that the narrator gives his own opinion on the current situation that he is in as well as talking about what things make them tick and keep them going in Ikebukuro: a city with a large underbelly that is the medium for the majority of both the plot's development and random violence throughout the series.

== Production ==
Although it has commonly been claimed that the title "Durarara" is an onomatopoeia for the "revving of an engine", Narita states specifically in the first light novel volume that the name means absolutely nothing. He had been editing the finished draft of his book, when his editor called. When prompted for a title, Narita "...just randomly gave a name, 'Du...Durarara?'" Upon hearing this, his editor responded with a positive remark as he liked ambiguous titles."

== Media ==
=== Light novel ===
The Durarara!! light novels are written by Ryohgo Narita and illustrated by Suzuhito Yasuda. The first novel was released in April 2004 under ASCII Media Works under their Dengeki Bunko imprint and the thirteenth and final novel was released in January 2014. A sequel series, titled Durarara!! SH (デュラララ!! SH, Durarara!! SH), started in 2014. Four volumes of Durarara!! SH have been released, but the series has not continued, likely due to Narita's health conditions.

A Chinese-language release in Taiwan and Hong Kong was published by the Taiwan branch of Kadokawa Media under their Fantastic Novels imprint. Daewon C.I. licensed the Korean-language release of the series in South Korea and released the novels under their Newtype Novels imprint. As of January 2015, it was announced that Yen Press would be releasing the Durarara!! novels in English under their Yen On Imprint. In October 2020, Yen Press announced it had licensed the Durarara!! SH novels for release.

No.	Original release date	Original ISBN	English release date	English ISBN
1	April 25, 2004	978-4-8402-2646-2	July 21, 2015	978-0-316-30474-0
2	March 10, 2005	978-4-8402-3000-1	November 17, 2015	978-0-316-30476-4
3	August 10, 2006	978-4-8402-3516-7	March 22, 2016	978-0-316-30477-1
4	March 10, 2008	978-4-8402-4186-1	July 19, 2016	978-0-316-30478-8
5	March 10, 2009	978-4-04-867595-6	November 15, 2016	978-0-316-30479-5
6	July 10, 2009	978-4-04-867905-3	March 21, 2017	978-0-316-30481-8
7	January 10, 2010	978-4-04-868276-3	July 25, 2017	978-0-316-43968-8
8	June 10, 2010	978-4-04-868599-3	November 14, 2017	978-0-316-47429-0
9	February 10, 2011	978-4-04-870274-4	March 20, 2018	978-0-316-47431-3
10	August 10, 2011	978-4-04-870729-9	July 17, 2018	978-0-316-47434-4
11	May 10, 2012	978-4-04-886562-3	November 27, 2018	978-0-316-47436-8
12	June 7, 2013	978-4-04-891746-9	March 26, 2019	978-0-316-47438-2
13	January 10, 2014	978-4-04-866217-8	September 17, 2019	978-1-9753-5819-8
Side Stories?!	August 9, 2014	978-4-04-866830-9	May 21, 2024	978-1-9753-9118-8

==== Durarara!! SH ====
No.	Original release date	Original ISBN	English release date	English ISBN
1	April 10, 2014	978-4-04-866486-8	May 25, 2021	978-1-9753-2277-9
2	October 10, 2014	978-4-04-869008-9	August 24, 2021	978-1-9753-2346-2
3	January 10, 2015	978-4-04-869169-7	March 22, 2022	978-1-9753-2349-3
4	February 10, 2016	978-4-04-865666-5	August 23, 2022	978-1-9753-2350-9

==== Orihara Izaya to, Yūyake wo ====
No.	Japanese release date	Japanese ISBN
1	July 10, 2015	978-4-04-865243-8
2	October 8, 2016	978-4-04-892407-8

==== Durarara!! × Hakata Tonkotsu Ramens ====
No.	Japanese release date	Japanese ISBN
1	October 8, 2016	978-4-04-892406-1

=== Manga ===
A manga adaptation of the first arc, written by Narita and illustrated by Akiyo Satorigi first appeared in the May issue of Square Enix's Monthly GFantasy in April 2009 and became a regular series starting with the magazine's July issue released June 2009. Four tankōbon have been released. The sequels, starting with Durarara!! Saika Arc followed. The manga is licensed in North America by Yen Press who released the first volume in January 2012.

A manga adaptation of the Durarara!! 3way standoff -alley- video game was serialized from the September issue of ASCII Media Works' monthly Sylph magazine released on July 22, 2013, to the October issue released on August 22, 2014, and was collected in two volumes. Another two-volume adaptation of Durarara!! Relay video game was serialized in the same magazine from October 22, 2014, to November 21, 2015.

A crossover manga with Yozakura Quartet, titled YZQ ✕ DRRR!!, was released with the limited edition Blu-Ray of Yozakura Quartet ~Hana no Uta~.

=== Anime ===
An anime adaption of the light novels was announced in the wraparound sleeve of the sixth volume of the light novel. The anime is produced by Brain's Base and started airing on January 8, 2010, on MBS, TBS, and CBC. The anime was simulcasted for English-speaking audiences within 24 hours of its Japanese premiere. The anime adapted the first three novels, and it was licensed by Beez Entertainment for European release; while at Anime Expo 2010, Aniplex of America confirmed that they have the license to Durarara!!, later producing an English dub for a January 2011 release. The English dub was produced at Bang Zoom! Entertainment. The music for the first season was composed by Makoto Yoshimori, who also wrote the music for Baccano!.

Aniplex of America released Durarara!! in three digipak, two-disc sets. Part one was released on January 25, 2011, part two was released on March 29, 2011, and part three was released on May 31, 2011. They were exclusively sold at RightStuf.com and at Bandai Entertainment's The Store. As of March 29, 2011, Durarara!! (Eps. 1–9, dubbed) have been added to the U.S. PlayStation Network Video Store. The anime began its U.S. broadcast on Cartoon Network's Adult Swim programming block on June 26, 2011, and aired its last episode on December 18, 2011.

On March 15, 2014, a new TV anime series was announced, titled Durarara!!×2 (デュラララ!!×2). The main staff from the first series returned, though it was produced at studio Shuka instead of Brain's Base. It aired in three different cours, or quarters of a year. The cours are subtitled Shō (承; lit. 'Understanding'), Ten (転; lit. 'Motion'), and Ketsu (結; lit. 'Conclusion') respectively. The first cour began in January 2015, the second cour began in July 2015, and the third cour began in January 2016. Crunchyroll simulcasts the series in North America, Central America, South America, Ireland, and the United Kingdom. Aniplex of America licensed the series and is streaming an English dub via Crunchyroll, Funimation and Hulu.

=== Radio ===
An internet radio show called Durarara!!Radio: Duraradi for Short!! (デュラララ!!ラジオ 略して デュララジ!!, Durarara!!Rajio Ryakushite Duraraji!!) was aired on February 26, 2010, and ended as of March 25, 2011. The hosts were Toshiyuki Toyonaga and Kana Hanazawa, the voices for Mikado Ryūgamine and Anri Sonohara respectively.

=== Video games ===
Two games based on the series have been released, both visual novels. The first one titled Durarara!! 3way standoff (デュラララ!! 3way standoff) was released for PlayStation Portable on September 22, 2010. An updated version with new routes, also for the PSP, titled Durarara!! 3way standoff -alley- (デュラララ!! 3way standoff -alley-) was released on August 25, 2011. It was also ported to Android under the title Durarara!! 3way standoff "mob" (デュラララ!! 3way standoff "mob") on November 22, 2011. As part of the Durarara 10th anniversary project, a port with new minigames titled Durarara!! 3way standoff -alley- V (デュラララ!! 3way standoff -alley- V) was announced; and was released on June 19, 2014, for PlayStation Vita. Another PlayStation Vita game titled Durarara!! Relay was released in January 2015.

== Reception ==
According to Oricon, the ninth volume of Durarara!! was the first to sell the most over a week in its bunkobon for February 7–13; previously, the highest-ranked DRRR!! volume had been the eighth, which ranked second. By March 2018, the light novel had over 5.6 million copies in circulation.

In a 2019 Forbes' article about the best anime of the 2010s decade, Lauren Orsini considered it to be one of the five best anime of 2010; she wrote: "With one is [sic] the largest casts I've ever seen in a show, all introduced at once, it's a wild ride with something for everyone". Crunchyroll staff also included it in such a list; writer Sergio Vaca said, "Despite including numerous elements, the anime manages to have multiple characters show us different perspectives of these events, making us feel really involved with the story and always keeping us on the edge of our seats with unexpected twists".
