= Baccano! =

Japanese light novel series

- Cover of the first light novel

バッカーノ! (Bakkāno!)
- Genre: Adventure; Mystery; Supernatural
- Light novel
- Written by: Ryōgo Narita
- Illustrated by: Katsumi Enami
- Published by: MediaWorks (2003–2008); ASCII Media Works (2008–)
- English publisher: NA: Yen Press
- Imprint: Dengeki Bunko
- Original run: February 10, 2003 – present
- Volumes: 22
- Manga

Baccano! 1931 The Grand Punk Railroad
- Written by: Ryōgo Narita
- Illustrated by: Ginyū Shijin
- Published by: MediaWorks
- Magazine: Dengeki Comic Gao!
- Original run: December 27, 2006 – February 27, 2008
- Volumes: 2
- Anime television series
- Directed by: Takahiro Omori
- Produced by: Shuko Yokoyama
- Written by: Noboru Takagi
- Music by: Makoto Yoshimori
- Studio: Brain's Base
- Licensed by: AUS: Madman Entertainment; NA: Aniplex of America; UK: Manga Entertainment (DVD); Anime Limited (Blu-ray)
- Original network: Wowow
- English network: IN: Animax; SEA: Animax; US: Funimation Channel
- Original run: July 26, 2007 – November 1, 2007
- Episodes: 16
- Manga
- Written by: Shinta Fujimoto
- Published by: Square Enix
- English publisher: NA: Yen Press
- Magazine: Young Gangan
- Original run: October 16, 2015 – January 6, 2017
- Volumes: 3
- Manga

Baccano! (From the 1700s)
- Written by: Kakuji Fujita
- Published by: DMM
- Imprint: Gigatoon Studio
- Magazine: DMM Books
- Original run: December 25, 2022 – June 25, 2023
- Volumes: 2
- icon

Baccano! (Japanese: バッカーノ!, Hepburn: Bakkāno!; Italian for 'ruckus', Italian pronunciation: [bakˈkaːno]) is a Japanese light novel series written by Ryohgo Narita and illustrated by Katsumi Enami. The series, told from multiple points of view, is mostly set within a fictional United States across time most notably the Prohibition era. Its characters includes alchemists, thieves, thugs, Mafiosi and Camorristi, who are, at first, unconnected to one another. After an immortality elixir is recreated in 1930 Manhattan, the characters begin to cross paths, setting off events that spiral further and further out of control.

The first novel was released in February 2003 under ASCII Media Works' (formerly MediaWorks) Dengeki Bunko imprint, twenty-two novels have so far been released. The novels were adapted into a sixteen episode anime television series directed by Takahiro Omori and produced by Brain's Base and Aniplex. The first thirteen episodes were aired on Wowow from July to November 2007; the final three were released direct-to-DVD. The series was also adapted into a two-volume manga, an adventure video game for the Nintendo DS and two drama CDs. An additional novel was released with the first drama CD and two gaiden novels were released in parts with the DVDs of the anime adaption.

Funimation has dubbed the anime episodes in English, and has licensed them for release in the United States and Canada. The series was also licensed by Manga Entertainment for English releases in the United Kingdom, and by Madman Entertainment for releases in Australia and New Zealand. The entire English-dubbed series was streamed through Hulu during October 2009 and English-subtitled episodes continue to be streamed. Funimation streams English-subtitled and English-dubbed episodes through their website. Funimation's rights to the series expired in 2016.

The light novels of the series have been well received by readers and have also been awarded. The first light novel, The Rolling Bootlegs, was awarded the Gold Prize of the ninth Dengeki Novel Prize, held by ASCII Media Works in 2002, after reaching third place. The anime adaptation of the series has been popular in Japan and the United States, and has also received significant praise for its plot, characters, strong dubbing, animation and musical score.

== Plot ==
Below is a summary for the past twenty-two volumes in chronological order.

Aboard the ship Advenna Avis in 1711, a group of alchemists summon a demon in the hopes of gaining eternal life. The demon gives them an elixir of immortality and the method of ending their existence, by "devouring" one another, and grants the summoner Maiza Avaro the formula of the elixir. Maiza and most of the alchemists decide that no one else must become immortal; only Szilard Quates opposes. That night, the alchemists begin to disappear, devoured by Szilard. Realizing the threat posed by staying together, they scatter across the globe.

In New York City during November 1930, Szilard succeeds in recreating the elixir, only to have it stolen by young thug Dallas Genoard. The elixir continually moves around the city because of Dallas, with the three mafiosi Gandor brothers, the two idiotic thieves Isaac Dian and Miria Harvent, and Maiza's protege Firo Prochainezo and their Camorra family, the Martillo, all passing it around. Szilard makes Dallas an incomplete immortal (meaning he still ages) to retrieve the elixir. However, all other parties accidentally consume the elixir, mistaking it for alcohol, at a party for Firo. Firo falls in love with Szilard's immortal homunculus Ennis, who betrays Szilard by telling Firo how to devour Szilard, which he does. The Gandor then cement Dallas to a barrel at the bottom of the Hudson River to punish him for killing Gandor members.

In late 1931, the Gandor fight the Runorata family for control of the same area after a new drug surfaces. In an attempt to resolve the situation, Luck Gandor asks his adoptive brother Claire Stanfield, an assassin and train conductor, to travel to New York. Claire agrees to, and as a conductor, boards the transcontinental train the Flying Pussyfoot. The train is hijacked by the Russo and Lemure gangs, who are trying to kidnap a senator's family, and a battle ensues between the two gangs. Jacuzzi Splot, Nice Holystone and their gang attempt to protect the passengers and fight the hijackers, while Claire assumes the identity of the Rail Tracer, a monster that eats train passengers, and slaughters much of the Russo and the Lemure. During a confrontation between Ladd Russo and Chane Laforet and the Lemure, Claire interrupts and proposes to Chane Laforet, who is the daughter of Huey Laforet, one of the original immortals aboard the Advenna Avis. A serial stowaway and newspaper field agent named Rachel flees Claire and ends up helping in the rescue of the hostages. The last remaining members of the Lemure are eventually defeated by Jacuzzi's gang, while sadistic murderer Ladd Russo is incarcerated and loses his arm to Claire. At the same time, Ennis writes to Isaac and Miria, inviting them to Manhattan. The duo boards the same train and meets Jacuzzi, and unwittingly sway immortal Czeslaw Meyer from enacting malevolent acts via bombs to be used in the New York Drug War.

The train arrives in New Year 1932 with the survivors going their separate ways: Jacuzzi and Nice escape custody and go into hiding after their base of operations in Chicago was taken over by the Russo family; information gatherer Rachel returns to the Daily Days mostly unscathed; Isaac and Miria introduce Czes to the Martillo family and is subsequently adopted by Firo and Ennis, who later marry, as the latter's brother; and Claire begins his mission to exterminate the enemies of his adoptive brothers, with his intentions to find Chane and marry her after the job is done.

Later that year in 1932, Dallas' sister Eve searches for Dallas, putting her at odds with the Gandor family. These stories involved the Daily Days News Information company and the Runorattas' drug plot with Begg, a drug-addicted immortal alchemist acquaintance of Maiza's encroaching Gandor turf through his miracle drugs, testing it on innocent bystanders including a young man named Roy Maddock. Eventually Eve is caught up in the turf war involving drugs with the Runoratta family and Gandors, the ramifications of the turf war affecting two lovers: Gandor speakeasy waitress Edith and her boyfriend, revealed to be Roy. The climax of the conflict results in Luck secretly telling Eve where Dallas is to spare her from bloodshed, and with Claire's help, the turf war ends with bittersweet results for Edith and Roy now associated with the Gandors until they finish the debt they compiled in the story albeit in happier terms.

Eventually in 1933, Dallas is pulled out of the river, but shortly after, he is abducted by the Larvae, a group working for Huey Laforet. Meanwhile, Jacuzzi's operations begin to encroach on Gandor and Martillo turf. Representatives (Ronnie Schiatto, Ennis, Maria Barcelito and Tick Jefferson) from both groups converge on Eve's home, where his gang is staying along with Isaac and Miria. At the same time, the Larvae arrive to enlist Jacuzzi's help; they have kidnapped Dallas to prove that immortality is possible, and attempt to convince Jacuzzi into join them. However it devolves into an incident at the mansion, forcing both parties to temporarily retreat and attract the attention of Claire after hearing Chane was injured in the battle. Their conflict reaches a prominent building in New York called Mist Wall, the largest branch office of the military equipment researcher and developer Nebula, is bombed according to Huey's plan but mitigated by the intervention of various parties involved. The gangs avert further catastrophe by stopping the Larvae group and with Tick Jefferson making amends with Larvae leader Tim, revealed to be his lost younger brother before once again going their separate ways.

The next year in 1934 at Alcatraz Island, Ladd Russo befriends Firo, who was framed by fellow Immortal Victor Talbot for the Mist Wall public bombing and Isaac, who was finally caught for his thefts, leaving Miria morose from his arrest. All three men meet Huey Laforet in separate occasions, who was charged with treason and conspiracy years ago with affiliation to the Lemures among other terrorist acts. Meanwhile, Christopher Shouldered, Huey's homunculus, and Graham Specter, Ladd's loyal follower, cause an all out war in Chicago through various battles enacted by the Lamia, Nebula and the Russo family led by a now immortal Placido Russo with each battling for their lives. Afterwards, Jacuzzi and his gang return to Chicago while Ladd attempts to kill Huey and fails thanks to the efforts of Isaac, Firo and Chane's homunculus sister, Leeza Laforet; however, the scuffle resulted in Huey's eye taken with the help of Lamia operative Sham, a homunculus who can take over one's consciousness by contact through his body in the form of water. The homunculus group Lamia (associated with Larvae, the group previously encountered by the cast in 1933) cause trouble for the Russo family while this happens. Several of the Lamia join their forces and others split after the conflict, particularly Christopher joining with the Russo family to protect the androgynous heir Ricardo Russo along with Lamia member Sickle and Graham Spector. Isaac is eventually released from Alcatraz along with Firo after fulfilling their mission. Placido Russo, Ricardo's grandfather and Ladd's uncle, is eventually turned immortal and consumed by Nebula scientist Renee for his failure in stopping the rampage of Chicago, resulting in Ricardo inheriting the crime family.

The remainder of the plot focuses on an even older faction of immortals led by Huey's mentor and former lover, Renee Paramedes Branvillier, who details their relationship with the 1711 immortals from the 1700s till the later 1930s and how the corporation Nebula involves themselves against the other crime families by allying themselves with Senator Manfred Beriam, who bears malevolent grudges against immortals.

In 1935, one particular immortal named Melvi targets Firo in by manipulating the entire cast to partake in a high stakes casino royale party in a newly established building called Ra's Lance run by various Mafia families, however many other characters have various agendas that threatens his plan. He intends to endanger Ennis in order to extract the memories of Szilard Quaites by eating Firo, unaware that his bodyguard is Claire Stanfield, resulting in his defeat. Later, Renee continues to pursue Huey by attempting to reclaim their daughter Chane for an experiment which put her at odds with Claire who intends to marry their daughter. As of this writing, the conflict remains unresolved.

In 2001, Maiza and a few immortals appear in a rural European town to apprehend a fellow alchemist and immortal Elmer C. Albatross, who had been masquerading as a demon and was imprisoned by the locals. They uncover an age old conspiracy detailing the origins of water homunculi from the 1930s (Sham and Leeza Laforet, sister of Chane) and also putting a stop the experiments on the people that had been ongoing in the town as they remained unaware of Szilard Quaite's demise for almost the remaining century, his descendant Bild Quaites later encounters the immortals and reveals the horrific secrets of the village. Phil and Felt Nebil, homunculi resulting from Szilard's experiments are subsequently freed from the village and allowed to wander the earth, ending up in New York after the ordeal.

In 2002, a cult named SAMPLE launches a heist to replicate the Flying Pussyfoot incident via a twin cruise ship named Exit and Entrance only to be thwarted by Claire Stanfield and Chane Laforet's descendants, Claudia and Charon Walken with Jacuzzi Splot and Nice Holystone's descendant, Bobby Splot along with his gang with unwitting aide from another faction called Mask Makers led by Huey's descendant Luchino B. Campanella. It is eventually revealed that Czes's tormentor Fermet is in fact the mastermind and overall villain of the series after Szilard Quates.

== Production ==
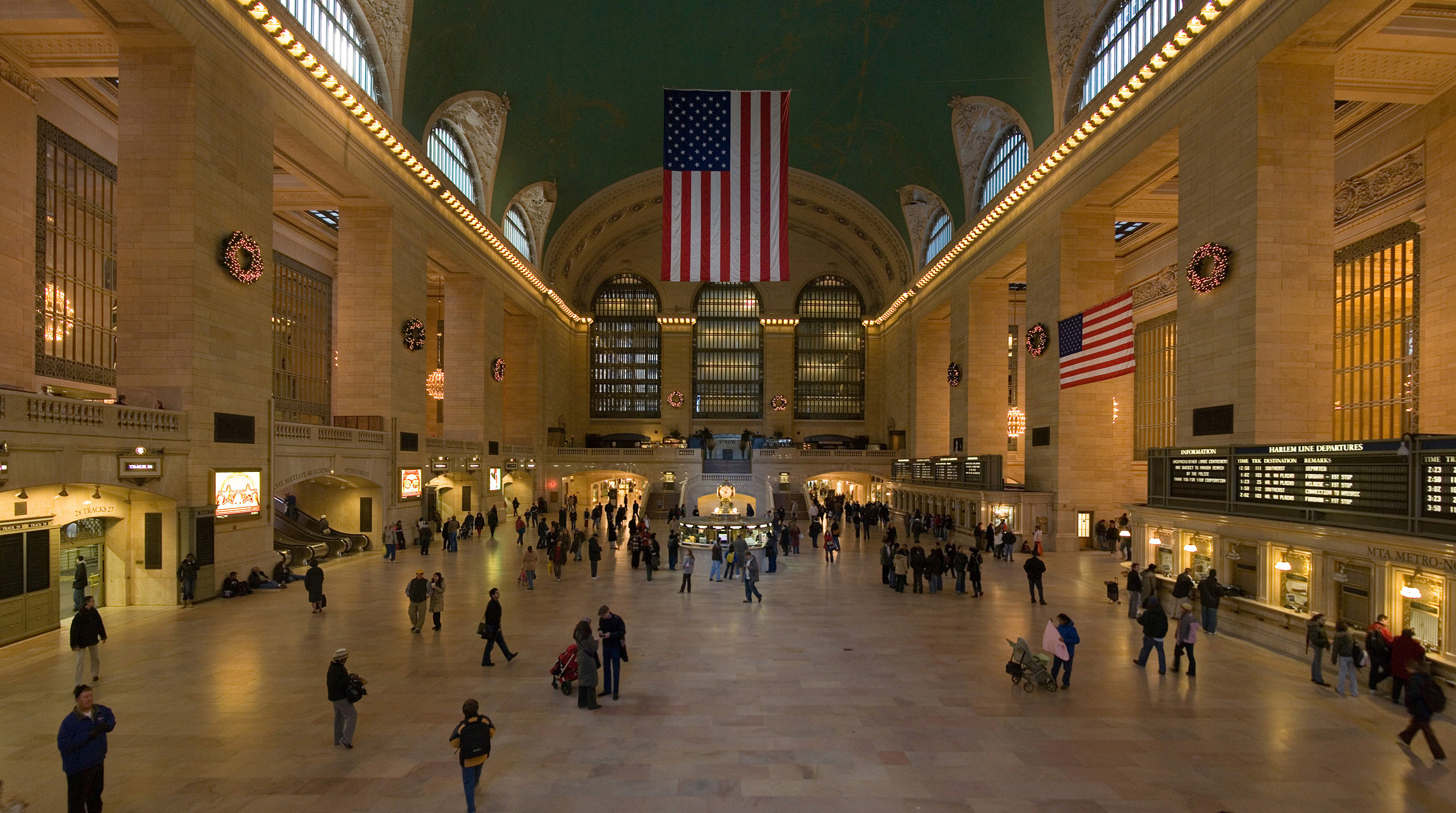
To portray Manhattan accurately, Akira Ito, art director of the anime series, visited locations such as Grand Central Terminal.

Ryohgo Narita wanted to write a story set during the Prohibition and chose a light novel as the medium because not many of them had that setting. He believed that this choice would better attract the interest of the ASCII Media Works judges. After Narita saw The Untouchables, he spent about ten days working with inspirations and created Baccano! "out of [his] useless calculations." While writing the first novel The Rolling Bootlegs, he consulted many books while writing and mixed fictional elements with historical situations to create a unique plot flow. The story he originally planned was about an ancient magician who was revived during the Prohibition and began to terrorize New York City. A group of mafiosi then violently oppose the magician. However, the story became very different from the original concept. Narita never wrote a detailed outline for the novel and is relieved by that fact because it allowed the characters to "move on their own." The original stages of the series included more supernatural elements. Maiza Avaro was a hypnotist; Ennis was a succubus; Szilard was a magician. In addition, every member of the Camorra, except for Firo, did not survive. Despite the great differences between the characters' initial concepts and the result, Narita is "glad" that these ideas were not used in the finished novel.

Narita did not begin work on a second novel during the six months after the publication of The Rolling Bootlegs because his chief editor asked him to write nothing until after he graduated from university. After his graduation, he was offered to publish his next book in August, and he submitted his manuscripts in late April, a bit behind original deadlines. He had written over 400 pages, making the price over ¥700, which is a high price for a novel written by a newcomer. This worried Narita because it was unlikely anyone would buy the novel. As a result, he and his chief editor decided that the novel would be released in two parts. However, Narita was still anxious about publishing such a long novel. To motivate himself to write more, he would often refer back to the dialogue he had written for Ladd Russo. As with the first novel, the plot changed because of the characters' "movements", most notably Claire Stanfield. Narita noted that all of the Lemure and Russo, with the exception of a character named Neider, were originally planned to die, but Claire's presence in the novel left that concept "in ruins". In addition, Chane Laforet, who was not well liked by the author, was also supposed to die, but as time passed, Narita became attached to her and changed her fate.

While creating the anime series, art director Akira Ito and other staff members scouted Manhattan and surrounding neighborhoods to accurately portray the area. They visited the Hell's Kitchen neighborhood, Chinatown, Little Italy, Grand Central Terminal and various locations in Brooklyn and along the East River, many of which provide the backdrop for the events in Baccano!. The staff also visited the Steamtown National Historic Site to create accurate steam locomotives.

Tyler Walker, the ADR director of the English dub of the series, held auditions for six days, during which about 140 people came for the eighteen main roles. Walker states that this is probably the longest casting process Funimation has held. He comments that because there are a lot of characters and most of them are older men, a character type he does not work with often, choosing voice actors and familiarizing them with their characters was difficult. He asked many directors and actors for recommendations and mainly aimed to cast newcomers, as he felt Baccano! provided him a chance to discover newer talent. Walker wished to find actors who could provide the dialect and accents of the various time periods and locations, especially when casting for the characters with heavy European accents.

To prepare to write the script, Walker watched various movies featuring gangsters. He attempted to take what he could from The Untouchables, especially Robert De Niro's portrayal of Al Capone. Walker watched movies created and set in the 1930s, including but not limited to The Public Enemy, Little Caesar, Once Upon a Time in America, Miller's Crossing and various movies starring James Cagney, because he believed they would give him a truer feel on how people of the era sounded and talked. He wanted to capture the lingo and rhythm. Because Baccano! is a "stylized gangster flick" and because of the nature of anime, he made the dialogue more flowery and lingo-ridden than it would have been in reality.

The series' visuals have also led to it being considered dieselpunk.

== Media ==
=== Light novels ===
The Baccano! light novels are written by Ryohgo Narita and illustrated by Katsumi Enami. Originally, Narita entered the first novel into ASCII Media Works' ninth Dengeki Novel Prize in 2002 and the novel won the Gold Prize, placing third. The first novel was released in February 2003 under ASCII Media Works' Dengeki Bunko imprint, and as of August 2016, twenty-two novels have been released. In addition, one novel accompanied the first drama CD, released on March 31, 2006, and two gaiden novels were released in parts with DVDs of the anime adaption, released from October 24, 2007, to May 28, 2008.

Daewon C.I. licensed the Korean-language release of the series in South Korea and releases the novels under their NT Novels imprint. A Chinese-language release in Taiwan and Hong Kong is published by the Taiwan branch of Kadokawa Media under their Fantastic Novels imprint.

It was announced at the 2015 Anime Expo that Yen Press would start publishing the Baccano! novels in English in 2016. The English edition of the first volume, The Rolling Bootlegs, was published in May 2016.

=== Drama CDs ===
The series has been adapted into two drama CDs. The first, titled 1931 Local Chapter ・ Express Chapter (鈍行編・特急編, Donkōhen ・ Tokkyūhen) The Grand Punk Railroad, was released March 31, 2006, by MediaWorks. Named after the second and third light novels, the CD retells the events occurring aboard the Flying Pussyfoot train.

The second CD, Firo Prochainezo witnesses the 53rd death of Pietro Gonzalez (フィーロ・プロシェンツォ、ピエトロ・ゴンザレスの五十三回目の死を目撃す, Firo Puroshentso, Pietoro Gonzaresu no gojūsankaime no shi o mokugeki su), was released by Movic on October 24, 2007. It follows Firo and Luck as they chase two men to a small village in Mexico and attempt to retrieve money stolen from the Martillo and Gandor families.

=== Anime ===
A 16-episode anime series directed by Takahiro Omori and produced by Brain's Base, Aniplex and Movic was adapted from the light novels. The episodes describe the events spanning from 1930 to 1932 in a non-linear fashion, including the recreation of the immortality elixir, the hijacking of the Flying Pussyfoot, Eve's hunt for her brother and the gang war between the Gandor and the Runorata. The first thirteen episodes aired in Japan from July 26, 2007, to November 1, 2007, on WOWOW, a Japanese pay-per-view station, and the final three were released direct-to-DVD. The series made its North American television debut when it started airing on the Funimation Channel in 2010.

Eight DVD compilations were released by Aniplex, each containing two episodes, with the first released on October 24, 2007, and the eighth on May 28, 2008. A Blu-ray Baccano! limited edition boxset was released on January 26, 2011, by Aniplex. On July 21, 2008, Funimation announced that it has licensed Baccano! for a North American release. Four DVD compilations were released, with the first on January 27, 2009, and the fourth on June 16, 2009. A complete DVD collection boxset was released December 29, 2009, and re-released on December 28, 2010, as part of a lower-priced Viridian Collection. A limited edition Blu-ray boxset was released May 17, 2011. The entire English-dubbed series was streamed through Hulu during October 2009 and English-subtitled episodes continue to be streamed, and Funimation streamed subtitled and dubbed episodes through their website. In Australia and New Zealand, the series is licensed by Madman Entertainment, who released the series over four DVDs between June 24, 2009, and October 21, 2009. A boxset was released on March 17, 2010. Baccano! is licensed in the United Kingdom by Manga Entertainment and was released as a complete boxset on October 11, 2010. The series aired in the Philippines, Hong Kong, India, Pakistan, and Southeast Asia on Animax Asia.

On January 25, 2016, it was announced that Funimation's DVD home distribution and streaming rights for the anime would expire on February 8, 2016, and the series would be transferred to Aniplex of America.

==== Soundtrack ====
The series' original soundtrack was released as Spiral Melodies on October 24, 2007, by Aniplex. Two singles, "Gun's & Roses" by Paradise Lunch and "Calling" by Kaori Oda, were released on August 22, 2007. "Gun's and Roses" contained the opening theme, a vocal version of the opening, two songs and karaoke versions of the three tracks. The "Calling" single included the ending theme, another track and the karaoke versions of the two.

=== Manga ===
A manga adaption titled Baccano! 1931 The Grand Punk Railroad was written by Narita and illustrated by Ginyū Shijin. It was published in MediaWorks' Dengeki Comic Gao! magazine from December 27, 2006, to February 27, 2008, and was collected in two volumes released July 27, 2007, and April 26, 2008. The chapters center around the hijacking of the Flying Pussyfoot train. The Chinese-language release is published by the Taiwan branch of Kadokawa Media.

A second adaptation, written by Shinta Fujimoto and published in Square Enix's Young Gangan magazine, was published between October 16, 2015, and January 6, 2017, and collected in three volumes. The series was licensed by Yen Press, who published the chapters simultaneously with Japan.

A third manga adaptation (of the eleventh volume, 1705 The Ironic Light Orchestra), titled Baccano! (From the 1700s), written and illustrated by Kakuji Fujita, was released from December 25, 2022, to June 25, 2023, on DMM's DMM Books manga website, and collected into two volumes.

==== Volumes ====
No.	Original release date	Original ISBN	English release date	English ISBN
1	February 10, 2016	978-4-7575-4876-3	January 30, 2018	978-0316552783
1. "1927 NY"; 2. "San Gennaro"; 3. "Determination"; 4. "Devotion"; 5. "Destiny"
2	August 10, 2016	978-4-7575-5072-8	April 10, 2018	978-0316448451
6. "Day 1"; 7. "Encounter"; 8. "Lost"; 9. "Szilard"; 10. "Gandor Family"; 11. "Thief Couple"; 12. "Ennis"; 13. "Tipping Point"
3	April 10, 2017	978-4-7575-5268-5	May 22, 2018	978-0316448482
14. "Camorrista"; 15. "Party! Party! Party!"; 16. "Day 2"; 17. "Confront"; 18. "Archnemesis"; 18. "Homunculus"; 19. "Intruder"; 20. "Showdown"; 21. "Epilogue"

=== Video game ===
On February 28, 2008, MediaWorks released an adventure game, simply titled Baccano!, for the Nintendo DS. Based on the two Grand Punk Railroad light novels, the game recounts the events aboard the Flying Pussyfoot train from multiple perspectives. The player's goal is to help the passengers arrive safely in New York City by selecting the correct choices. The game can conclude with one of about fifty scenarios, depending on the player's decisions.

=== Artbook ===
On February 20, 2009, ASCII Media Works released an art book titled Katsumi Enami Artbook Baccano! (エナミカツミ画集バッカーノ!, Enami Katsumi Gashū Baccano!). The book not only featured illustrations drawn by Enami, but also included a story titled Boy Czeslaw, Fellows of the Forest (of Buildings) (チェスワフぼうやと、(ビルの)森の仲間達, Chesuwafu Bōya to, (Biru no) Mori no Nakamatachi).

== Reception ==
While reviewing the first light novel, Gabriella Ekens from Anime News Network said "The prose in Baccano! is extremely punchy, moving quickly by focusing heavily on dialogue and action." She also praised it by saying "blast moment to moment." Nevertheless, she found its gore as a con to enjoying it.

The anime adaptation of Baccano! has received positive reviews. Several critics from various websites have praised the series for its plot, characters, animation, musical score and its voice acting. For example, THEM Anime Reviews gave the entire series a score of 5 out of 5 stars, with reviewer Bradley Meek stating that the show was "a joy to watch" and despite the fact that "the series ends on an epilogue that feels a bit flat", it left him with "the best possible feeling: a mixture of contentment and a hunger to see more". He also praised the series for its animation which looked "great throughout, especially for a TV series" before summarizing the series as a "beautiful, confounding mess of chaos and delight".

Baccano! has received significant praise from Anime News Network reviewers. Theron Martin described the anime as "sometimes humorous, occasionally brutal, and nearly always fun". He claimed that the anime's "complex plotting and voluminous casting, combined with strong dubbing, animation, and musical score, make this a must-see series for fans of American mobster stories," and concluding that "this could be one of the year's best series." In his review, Carl Kimlinger claimed Baccano! to be "one of the best, and certainly the most cleverly written series in recent years" and described it as "lethally fun" before giving the series an 'A' rating for both the subbed and dubbed versions.

Davey C. Jones of Active Anime praised the anime, stating that, "Like Pulp Fiction changed the way we saw movies, Baccano will be the story that will change the way we see anime," concluding that "this all over the map anime is one unique and crazy ride from start to its never ending finale" and that "Baccano offers something truly unique in anime."

Daryl Surat and Mike Toole of Anime World Order Podcast consider Baccano! to be their "pick for best series of 2007 (or 2009 depending on how you want to count it)." Bryce Coulter of Mania Entertainment gave the complete series a 'B' rating, stating that it is "a drastic and welcome departure from your typical anime formula and that's what makes it so intriguing," and concluding that it has a "little bit of comedy, drama, action, and romance all swirled up into one giant ruckus of fun!"
