= Ryōgo Narita =

Japanese light novelist and manga writer (born 1980)

- Born: May 30, 1980 (age 46) Japan
- Area: Writer
- Notable works: Durarara!! Baccano!

Ryōgo Narita (Japanese: 成田 良悟, Hepburn: Narita Ryōgo; born May 30, 1980) is a Japanese light novelist and manga writer. He won the Gold Prize in the 9th Dengeki Novel Prize for Baccano!, which was made into an anime television series in 2007. His series Durarara!! was also made into two anime television series, one airing January 2010 and the second in January 2015.

== Works ==
Narita's works all feature a single thematic style, involving an ensemble cast of characters (each with their own viewpoint chapters) finding their lives intersecting with each other in various ways due to a supernatural entity, and more often than not getting into conflict with each other. Additionally, the first four light novel titles below take place within a shared universe known by fans as the "Naritaverse", featuring fantastical elements within an otherwise normal society.

=== Baccano! ===
Baccano! is mostly set within a fictional United States during various time periods, most notably the Prohibition era. It focuses on various characters, including alchemists, thieves, thugs, Mafiosi and Camorristi, who are unconnected to one another. After an immortality elixir is recreated in 1930 Manhattan, the characters begin to cross paths, setting off events that spiral further and further out of control. It is illustrated by Katsumi Enami.

#	Name	ISBN
1	Baccano! 1930 The Rolling Bootlegs (バッカーノ！The Rolling Bootlegs)	978-4-8402-2278-5
2	Baccano! 1931 Local Chapter The Grand Punk Railroad (バッカーノ！1931 鈍行編 The Grand Punk Railroad)	978-4-8402-2459-8
3	Baccano! 1931 Express Chapter The Grand Punk Railroad (バッカーノ！1931 特急編 The Grand Punk Railroad)	978-4-8402-2494-9
4	Baccano! 1932 Drug & The Dominos (バッカーノ！1932 Drug The Dominos)	978-4-8402-2494-9
5	Baccano! 2001 The Children Of Bottle (バッカーノ！2001 The Children Of Bottle)	978-4-8402-2609-7
6	Baccano! 1933 (Part 1) THE SLASH ~Cloudy to Rainy~ (バッカーノ！1933＜上＞ THE SLASH ～クモリノチアメ～)	978-4-8402-2787-2
7	Baccano! 1933 (Part 2) THE SLASH ~Bloody to Fair~ (バッカーノ！1933＜下＞ THE SLASH ～チノアメハ、ハレ～)	978-4-8402-2850-3
8	Baccano! 1934 Imprisoned Chapter Alice in Jails (バッカーノ！1934 獄中編 Alice In Jails)	978-4-8402-3585-3
9	Baccano! 1934 Street Chapter Alice in Jails (バッカーノ！1934 娑婆編 Alice In Jails)	978-4-8402-3636-2
10	Baccano! 1934 Conclusion Chapter Peter Pan in Chains (バッカーノ！1934 完結編 Peter Pan In Chains)	978-4-8402-3805-2
11	Baccano! 1705 The Ironic Light Orchestra (バッカーノ！1705 The Ironic Light Orchestra)	978-4-8402-3910-3
12	Baccano! 2002 A Side - Bullet Garden (バッカーノ！2002【A side】Bullet Garden)	978-4-8402-4027-7
13	Baccano! 2002 B Side - Blood Sabbath (バッカーノ！2002【B side】blood sabbath)	978-4-8402-4069-7
14	Baccano! 1931 Special Express Chapter Another Junk Railroad (バッカーノ！1931 臨時急行編 ― Another Junk Railroad)	978-4-04-867462-1
15	Baccano! 1710 Crack Flag (バッカーノ！1710 Crack Flag)	978-4-04-868459-0
16	Baccano! 1932 Summer― Man in the Killer (バッカーノ! 1932 Summer―man in the killer)	978-4-04-870556-1
17	Baccano! 1711 Whitesmile (バッカーノ! 1711 Whitesmile)	978-4-04-886186-1
18	Baccano! 1935-A Deep Marble (バッカーノ! -1935 - A Deep Marble)	978-4-04-886893-8
19	Baccano! 1935-B Dr. Feelgreed (バッカーノ! -1935 - B Dr. Feelgreed)	978-4-04-891431-4
20	Baccano! 1931- Winter - The Time of The Oasis (バッカーノ!バッカーノ! 1931-Winter the time of the oasis)	978-4-04-891204-4
21	Baccano! 1935-C The Grateful Bet (バッカーノ!1935-C The Grateful Bet)	978-4-04-866037-2
22	Baccano! 1935-D Luckstreet Boys (バッカーノ!1935-D Luckstreet Boys)	978-4-04-892184-8

=== Etsusa Bridge ===
Etsusa Bridge is set on a giant, almost-finished bridge between Sadogashima and Niigata. Abandoned by the government, the bridge and the giant man-made floating island at the center have become a city of criminals and societal drop-outs. It is illustrated by Suzuhito Yasuda.

#	Name	ISBN
1	Bow Wow! Two Dog Night (バウワウ！ Two Dog Night)	4-8402-2549-4
2	Mew Mew! Crazy Cat's Night (Mew Mew! Crazy Cat's Night)	4-8402-2730-6
3	Garuguru! Dancing Beast Night<Part 1> (がるぐる！ <上> Dancing Beast Night)	4-8402-3233-4
4	Garuguru! Dancing Beast Night<Part 2> (がるぐる！ <下> Dancing Beast Night)	4-8402-3431-0
Gaiden	5656! Knights' Strange Night (5656(ゴロゴロ)!―Knights' Strange Night)	4-04-867346-7

=== Durarara!! ===
Durarara!! tells the story of a dullahan working as an underworld courier in Ikebukuro, an internet-based anonymous gang called the Dollars, and the chaos that unfolds around the most dangerous people in Ikebukuro. It is illustrated by Suzuhito Yasuda.

#	Name	ISBN
1	Durarara!! (デュラララ!!)	978-4-84-022646-2
2	Durarara!!×2 (デュラララ!!×2)	978-4-84-023000-1
3	Durarara!!×3 (デュラララ!!×3)	978-4-84-023516-7
4	Durarara!!×4 (デュラララ!!×4)	978-4-8402-4186-1
5	Durarara!!×5 (デュラララ!!×5)	978-4-04-867595-6
6	Durarara!!×6 (デュラララ!!×6)	978-4-04-867905-3
7	Durarara!!×7 (デュラララ!!×7)	978-4-04-868276-3
8	Durarara!!×8 (デュラララ!!×8)	978-4-04-868599-3
9	Durarara!!×9 (デュラララ!!×9)	978-4-04-870274-4
10	Durarara!!×10 (デュラララ!!×10)	978-4-04-870729-9
11	Durarara!!×11 (デュラララ!!×11)	978-4-04-886562-3
12	Durarara!!×12 (デュラララ!!×12)	978-4-04-891746-9
13	Durarara!!×13 (デュラララ!!×13)	978-4-04-866217-8
14	Durarara!! SH (デュラララ!!SH)	978-4-04-866486-8
15	Durarara!! SHx2 (デュラララ!!SHx2)	978-4-04-869008-9
16	Durarara!! SHx3 (デュラララ!!SHx3)	978-4-04-869169-7
17	Durarara!! SHx4 (デュラララ!!SHx4)	978-4-04-865666-5

=== Vamp! ===
Vamp! is a light novel series about vampires and other supernatural creatures that live on an island in Germany called Growerth. It is illustrated by Katsumi Enami.

#	Name	ISBN
1	Vamp! (ヴぁんぷ！)	4-8402-2688-1
2	Vamp! II (ヴぁんぷ！ II)	4-8402-3060-9
3	Vamp! III (ヴぁんぷ！ III)	4-8402-3128-1
4	Vamp! IV (ヴぁんぷ！IV)	4-04-867173-1
5	Vamp! V (ヴぁんぷ！V)	4-04-868928-2

=== Hariyama-san ===
Hariyama-san, Center of the World is a series of connected short stories that feature strange or supernatural events that are seemingly unrelated, except that every one involves the title character, Shinkichi Hariyama, as a minor character in some capacity. The last story in each volume ties all the previous stories together. It is illustrated by Katsumi Enami and Suzuhito Yasuda.

#	Name	ISBN
1	Hariyama-san, the Heart of the World (世界の中心､針山さん, Sekai no Chūshin, Hariyama-san)	978-4-8402-3177-0
2	Hariyama-san, the Heart of the World 2 (世界の中心、針山さん2, Sekai no Chūshin, Hariyama-san Ni)	978-4-8402-3724-6
3	Hariyama-san, the Heart of the World 3 (世界の中心、針山さん3, Sekai no Chūshin, Hariyama-san San)	978-4-04-868074-5

=== Bleach: Spirits Are Forever With You ===
Bleach: Spirits Are Forever With You is a light novel based on Tite Kubo's Weekly Shōnen Jump manga Bleach.

#	Name	ISBN
1	Bleach: Spirits Are Forever With You I (BLEACH Spirits Are Forever With You I)	978-4-0870-3265-9
2	Bleach: Spirits Are Forever With You II (BLEACH Spirits Are Forever With You II)	978-4-0870-3266-6

=== Stealth Symphony ===
Stealth Symphony is a manga which follows the story of Jig Kumonuma as he goes to the city of Jinbō-chō, a place where creatures of different species live, to remove a curse from his body. It is illustrated by Yōichi Amano.

#	Name	ISBN
1	Stealth Symphony 1 (ステルス交境曲 ①)	978-4-08-880157-5
2	Stealth Symphony 2 (ステルス交境曲 ②)	978-4-08-880199-5

=== Fate/strange Fake ===
The Fate/strange Fake novel is a spin-off of Fate/stay night. The story is set in the western U.S. during a war that occurs a few years after the conclusion of the Fifth Holy Grail War.

#	Name	ISBN
1	Fate/strange Fake (1)	978-4-04-869168-0
2	Fate/strange Fake (2)	978-4-04-865129-5
3	Fate/strange Fake (3)	978-4-04-865763-1
4	Fate/strange Fake (4)	978-4-04-892756-7
5	Fate/strange Fake (5)	978-4-04-893519-7
6	Fate/strange Fake (6)	978-4-04-912956-4
7	Fate/strange Fake (7)	978-4-04-914283-9
8	Fate/strange Fake (8)	978-4-04-914820-6
9	Fate/strange Fake (9)	978-4-04-915448-1

=== Dead Mount Death Play ===
Dead Mount Death Play is a manga written by Narita and illustrated by Shinta Fujimoto published in Square Enix's Young Gangan manga magazine since 2017. The story follows a necromancer known as the Corpse God who is reincarnated in the body of a boy named Polka Shinoyama in modern-day Shinjuku. The Corpse God takes on Polka's identity and soon integrates into the Shinjuku underworld.

#	Name	ISBN
1	Volume 1	978-4757557000
2	Volume 2	978-4757559226
3	Volume 3	978-4757561038
4	Volume 4	978-4757564015
5	Volume 5	978-4757566231
6	Volume 6	978-4757569607
7	Volume 7	978-4757572140
