= Moonlight Lady =

Moonlight Lady may refer to:

- Moonlight Lady (anime), the American release title for No Surface Moon The Animation; a 2001 Japanese OVA anime series
- "Moonlight Lady" (song), Julio Iglesias song written by Albert Hammond and appearing in Iglesias' 1984 album 1100 Bel Air Place
- Moonlight Lady (video game), an TurboGrafx-16 video game released for on 1993
