= Music of The Big O =

This article lists the albums and singles attributed to the anime series The Big O.

== Soundtrack albums ==
=== The Big O: Original Sound Score ===
The Big O: Original Sound Score

Soundtrack album by Toshihiko Sahashi
- Released: November 20, 1999
- Recorded: 1999
- Studios: Victor Studio; Sound City
- Genre: Anime soundtrack
- Length: 45:32
- Label: Victor
- Producer: Keiichi Nozaki

The Big O: Original Sound Score is the first soundtrack album of The Big O, released by Victor Entertainment on November 20, 1999. It contains the background music composed by Toshihiko Sahashi for the series' first season, plus the TV size versions of the opening and ending themes.

=== Track listing ===
All music is composed by Toshihiko Sahashi, except where indicated.

No.	Title	Lyrics	Music	Artist	Length
1.	"Stoning"				1:44
2.	"Big-O!" (TV Edit)	Brian May (Note: Originally credited solely to Rui Nagai, a legal settlement resulted in Brian May receiving main songwriting credits.); Rui Nagai	May; Nagai	Rui Nagai	1:14
3.	"Stand a Chance"				2:11
4.	"Name of God"				1:48
5.	"The Storm"				1:48
6.	"Spirit"				1:44
7.	"Servant"				1:22
8.	"Apologize"				2:05
9.	"Apparel"				1:16
10.	"The Great"				1:48
11.	"Apostle"				2:28
12.	"False"				1:28
13.	"Sleep My Dear"				2:17
14.	"Sure Promise"				2:00
15.	"Touch"				1:19
16.	"Weep For"				1:27
17.	"Nature"				1:43
18.	"The Words"				1:34
19.	"Run Down"				0:41
20.	"Tears"				1:18
21.	"The Process"				1:11
22.	"Sin"				1:34
23.	"A Vision"				1:19
24.	"Procrastination"				1:04
25.	"Freedom"				1:43
26.	"The Holy"				2:12
27.	"Evolution"				1:25
28.	"Eternal Life"				0:48
29.	"And Forever..." (TV Edit)	Chie	Ken Shima	Robbie Danzie with Naoki Takao	1:27
Total length:					45:32

=== The Big O: Original Sound Score II for Second Season ===
The Big O: Original Sound Score II for Second Season

Soundtrack album by Toshihiko Sahashi
- Released: January 22, 2003
- Recorded: 2002
- Studios: Victor Studio; Sound City
- Genre: Anime soundtrack
- Length: 47:09
- Label: Victor
- Producer: Keiichi Nozaki

The Big O: Original Sound Score II for Second Season is the second soundtrack album of The Big O, released by Victor Entertainment on January 22, 2003. It contains the background music composed by Toshihiko Sahashi for the series' second season, plus remixes of background music tracks from both seasons. The remixes are named after New York City streets.

=== Track listing ===
All music is composed by Toshihiko Sahashi, except where indicated.

No.	Title	Music	Length
1.	"Sure Promise" (Union Sq.)		1:59
2.	"Brick Ballades" (Houston St.)		2:28
3.	"Respect" (Upper West Side)		2:25
4.	"Apologize (Note: Misspelled "Apologine" on the album credits, with the Z tilted into an N.)" (Bleecker St.)		1:57
5.	"Painful Dream"		1:42
6.	"Respect" (Lower East Side)		1:47
7.	"Distance"		2:09
8.	"Solitude"		1:53
9.	"Dreadful"		1:56
10.	"Before Dawn"		1:45
11.	"Prayer" (50th St.)		2:14
12.	"Token"		1:00
13.	"Divine"		2:14
14.	"Chain"		2:39
15.	"Painful Dream" (Spring St.)		1:41
16.	"Prayer" (14th St.)		2:13
17.	"Centenary"		1:10
18.	"Perverse"		1:08
19.	"Obfuscate"		1:28
20.	"Prayer" (WTC St.)		2:14
21.	"Flag"		1:54
22.	"And Forever" (Grand Central)	Ken Shima	1:42
23.	"Legend of First Memory (Note: Misspelled "Regend of First Memory" on the album credits.)"		5:31
Total length:			47:09

== Singles ==
=== The Big O ===
"The Big O"

Single by Various artists

from the album The Big O: Original Sound Score
- Language: Japanese; English
- Released: October 21, 1999
- Recorded: 1999
- Genre: J-pop; hard rock; anison
- Length: 14:00
- Label: Victor
- Composers: Brian May; Rui Nagai; ("Big-O!"); Ken Shima ("And Forever...")
- Lyricists: Brian May; Rui Nagai; ("Big-O!"); Chie ("And Forever...")

Various artists singles chronology
"The Big O" (1999)	"Respect" (2003)

The Big O is the first single for the anime series of the same name, released by Victor Entertainment on October 21, 1999. It features the opening theme "Big-O!" by Rui Nagai and the ending theme "And Forever..." by Robbie Danzie with Naoki Takao. "Big-O!" was heavily inspired by the Queen song "Flash" (from the 1980 film Flash Gordon). Queen guitarist Brian May sought legal action against Nagai and, as part of a settlement, received main songwriting credits for the song.

=== Track listing ===
No.	Title	Lyrics	Music	Artist	Length
1.	"Big-O!"	Brian May; Rui Nagai	May; Nagai	Rui Nagai	3:13
2.	"And Forever..."	Chie	Ken Shima	Robbie Danzie with Naoki Takao	3:48
3.	"Big-O!" (Instrumental Version)				3:12
4.	"And Forever..." (Instrumental Version)				3:45
Total length:					14:00

=== "Respect" ===
"Respect"

Single by Various artists

from the album The Big O: Original Sound Score II for Second Season
- Language: Japanese; English
- Released: January 3, 2003
- Recorded: 1999, 2002
- Genre: Anime soundtrack; J-pop; hard rock; anison
- Length: 18:55
- Label: Victor
- Composers: Toshihiko Sahashi ("Respect"): Brian May; Rui Nagai; ("Big-O!"); Ken Shima ("And Forever...")
- Lyricists: Brian May; Rui Nagai; ("Big-O!"); Chie ("And Forever...")

Various artists singles chronology
"The Big O" (1999)	"Respect" (2003)

"Respect" is the second single for the anime series The Big O, released by Victor Entertainment on January 3, 2003. It features the second season opening theme by Toshihiko Sahashi, plus the re-release of the original opening theme "Big-O!" by Rui Nagai and the ending theme "And Forever..." by Robbie Danzie with Naoki Takao.

=== Track listing ===
No.	Title	Lyrics	Music	Artist	Length
1.	"Respect"		Toshihiko Sahashi	Toshihiko Sahashi	1:07
2.	"Big-O!"	Brian May; Rui Nagai	May; Nagai	Rui Nagai	3:11
3.	"And Forever..."	Chie	Ken Shima	Robbie Danzie with Naoki Takao	3:46
4.	"Big-O!" (Karaoke Version)				3:11
5.	"And Forever..." (Instrumental Version)				3:46
6.	"Big-O!" (Showtime Ver.)	May; Nagai	May; Nagai	Rui Nagai	1:15
7.	"And Forever..." (TV Edit)	Chie	Shima	Robbie Danzie with Naoki Takao	1:30
8.	"Big-O!" (TV Edit)	May; Nagai	May; Nagai	Rui Nagai	1:07
Total length:					18:55
