= Master of Entertainment =

Japanese anime company

Disambiguation: "Masters of Entertainment may also refer to an educational degree, for example John Tarnoff's "Masters of Entertainment Technology" degree from the Entertainment Technology Center

Master of Entertainment (m.o.e.) is a Pony Canyon label responsible for production in various anime works. Their name is based on the term moe (slang) as they primarily produce "cute" anime.

== Anime involved in producing ==
- The Cosmopolitan Prayers
- Hanaukyo Maid Team OAV and TV
- Hit wo Nerae!
- Love Love? (also planning)
- Rizelmine
- Steel Angel Kurumi 2 (TV)
- Steel Angel Kurumi Pure (live-action TV)
- Steel Angel Kurumi Zero (OAV)
- Ultimate Girls (Original story)

== See also ==
- Imagin (studio)
