= Suzuna =

Suzuna may refer to:

- Suzuna Hīragi, a fictional character of Dog & Scissors.
- Suzuna Kuraki, a fictional character of Moonlight Lady.
- Suzuna Taki, a fictional character of Eyeshield 21.
