= Takeo Takahashi =

Japanese animator

- Occupations: Animator, storyboard artist, director
- Years active: 1991–present
- Employer(s): Studio Kuma (former); Imagin (former); Passione (Managing director)

Takeo Takahashi (高橋 丈夫, Takahashi Takeo) is a Japanese animator, animation director, and storyboard artist.

== Filmography ==
=== Director ===
==== Television series ====
Year	Title	Co-director(s) (Note: Directors credited for all works as Director (監督, Kantoku) unless noted otherwise.)	Studio	Eps.	Storyboard art.
2004	Hit o Nerae!	N/A	Imagin	12	Yes (#1)
2004	Love Love?	N/A	Imagin	13	No
2004	The Cosmopolitan Prayers	N/A	Imagin	12	Yes (#1, 8, 9, 11)
2008	Spice and Wolf	N/A	Imagin	12	Yes (#1-2, 6, 10, opening, ending)
2009	Spice and Wolf II	N/A	Brain's Base; Marvy Jack	12	Yes (#1-3, 6, 11-12, opening, ending)
2010	Yosuga no Sora	N/A	Feel	12	Yes (#1, 3-4, 10, 12, opening, ending)
2012	So, I Can't Play H!	N/A	Feel	12	Yes (#1, 12, ending)
2013	Maoyu	N/A	Arms	12	Yes (#1, 3, 5, 12, opening, ending)
2015	Rokka: Braves of the Six Flowers	N/A	Passione	12	Yes (#1, 5)
2017	Hinako Note	Toru Kitahata	Passione	12	Yes (#1)
2018	Citrus	Naoyuki Tatsuwa	Passione	12	Yes (#1, 5, 11-12, opening, ending)
2019	Rinshi!! Ekoda-chan	N/A	Passione	1 (ep 9)	No
2019	Wasteful Days of High School Girls	Hijiri Sanpei	Passione	12	Yes (#1, ending, "sugoi" sequence)
2024–2025	Ishura	Yuki Ogawa	Passione	24	Yes (#1)
2024–present	Spice and Wolf: Merchant Meets the Wise Wolf	Hijiri Sanpei; Nobuyoshi Nagayama; Takahiro Majima	Passione	TBA	Yes (#1, 5, 8, 10, 18, 20, 22, 25, opening, epilogue (#13))
TBA	The Fake Alchemist	Hijiri Sanpei	Passione	TBA	TBA

==== OVAs ====
Year	Title	Co-director(s)	Studio	Eps.	Storyboard art.
2009	Spice and Wolf: Wolf and Amber Melancholy	N/A	Brain's Base; Marvy Jack	1	Yes
2009	Aki Sora	N/A	Hoods Entertainment	1	Yes
2010	Aki Sora: Yume No Naka	N/A	Hoods Entertainment	2	Yes (#1-2, ending)
2012	Ai Mai! Moe Can Change!	N/A	Frontier Works	1	No
2019	The Island of Giant Insects	Naoyuki Tatsuwa	Passione	1	No

==== Films ====
Year	Title	Co-director(s)	Studio	Dur.	Storyboard art.
2020	The Island of Giant Insects	Naoyuki Tatsuwa	Passione	76 minutes	No

=== Other ===
==== Television series ====
Year	Title	Director(s)	Studio	Role(s)
1991	Blue Seed	Kamiya Jun	Ashi Productions; Production I.G	In-Between Animator ( #4, 10)
1991	Jankenman	Endou Tetsuya	Ashi Productions	In-Between Animator (#20, 27, 32, 38, 45, 49)
1995	Ping Pong Club	Hata Masami	Grouper Productions	Key Animator (#21, 26)
1995	Tenchi Universe	Negishi Hiroshi	AIC	In-Between Animator (#12)
1997	Virus Buster Serge	Oobari Masami	Plum	Key Animator (#1)
1998	Gasaraki	Ryousuke Takahashi	Sunrise	Key Animator (#21)
2000	Gate Keepers	Satou Jun'ichi	Gonzo	Animation Director (#8, 18); Key Animator (#5, 14)
2000	Love Hina	Iwasaki Yoshiaki	Xebec	Key Animator (#2)
2000	Hand Maid May	Kimura Shin'ichirou	TNK	Key Animator (#4)
2001	Sister Princess	Asami Matsuo; Oohata Kiyotaka; Ikushi Itada	Zexcs	Storyboard (#10)
2001	Comic Party	Norihiko Sudo	OLM, Inc.	Key Animator (#12)
2002	Rizelmine	Matsumura Yasuhiro	Imagin; Madhouse	Assistant Director; Storyboard (#18, 21)
2002	Galaxy Angel A	Shigehito Takayanagi	Madhouse	Assistant Director (#15); Storyboard (#23)
2002	Pita Ten	Kawase Toshifumi; Satou Yuuzou	Madhouse	Assistant Director (#12)
2004	Rozen Maiden	Matsuo Kou	Nomad	Assistant Director (#2, 6, 11); Storyboard (#2); Key Animator (#11)
2005	Strawberry 100%	Sekita Osamu	Madhouse	Storyboard (#4)
2005	Oku-sama wa Joshi Kōsei	Shishido Jun	Madhouse	Storyboard (#1-2, 5, 7-10, 12, 15, 17, 22-23, 25-26)
2006	The Story of Saiunkoku	Shishido Jun	Madhouse	Storyboard (#4, 13, 25, 27, 35-36)
2006	Strawberry Panic	Sakoi Masayuki	Madhouse	Storyboard (#8, 15-16, 25)
2006	Yume Tsukai	Yamazaki Kazuo	Madhouse	Storyboard (#4)
2007	Princess Resurrection	Sakoi Masayuki	Madhouse	Subtitle Design; Storyboard (#4, 8, 13, ending); Assistant Director (ending)
2007	The Story of Saiunkoku: Second Season	Shishido Jun	Madhouse	Storyboard (#1)
2010	The Qwaser of Stigmata	Kaneko Hiraku	Hoods Entertainment	Storyboard (#8, 13, ending)
2011	The Qwaser of Stigmata II	Kaneko Hiraku	Hoods Entertainment	Storyboard (#10, 12, ending)
2011	Mayo Chiki!	Kawaguchi Keiichirou	Feel	Storyboard (#2)
2011	Manyu Hiken-cho	Kaneko Hiraku	Hoods Entertainment	Storyboard (#9, 11)
2012	Listen to Me, Girls. I Am Your Father!	Kawasaki Itsurou	Feel	Storyboard (#4, 8)
2013	Outbreak Company	Oikawa Kei	Feel	Storyboard (#6)
2013	Pac-Man and the Ghostly Adventures	Motonori Sakakibara	41 Entertainment; Arad Productions; Bandai Namco Entertainment	Production Manager
2014	Hamatora	Seiji Kishi; Hiroshi Kimura	NAZ	Storyboard (#2, 4)
2014	Rail Wars!	Sueda Yoshifumi	Passione	Storyboard (#3, 8, 10)
2019	Z/X: Code Reunion	Sueda Yoshifumi	Passione	Storyboard (#5, 12)
2020	Sakura Wars: The Animation	Ono Manabu	Sanzigen	Storyboard (#9)
2020	Higurashi: When They Cry - GOU	Kawaguchi Keiichiro	Passione	Storyboard (#9, 11, 13, 22, ending)
2021	Higurashi: When They Cry - SOTSU	Kawaguchi Keiichirou	Passione	Storyboard (#3, 6, 10, 14, ending)
2021	Mieruko-chan	Yuki Ogawa	Passione	Storyboard (#10)
2022	Harem in the Labyrinth of Another World	Tatsuwa Naoyuki	Passione	Storyboard (#4,11)
2022	Love Flops	Nobuyoshi Nagayama	Passione	Storyboard (#4)

==== OVAs/ONAs ====
Year	Title	Director(s)	Studio	Role(s)
1992	All Purpose Cultural Cat Girl Nuku Nuku	Moriyama Yuuji	Animate Film	In-Between Animator
1992	Genesis Survivor Gaiarth	Hiroyuki Kitazume; Shinji Aramaki; Masayuki Oozeki; Hideaki Oba	Artmic; AIC	In-Between Animator
1999	Gravitation	Shinichi Sakura; Awai Shigeki	Animate Film	Key Animator
2002	Virgin Fleet	Hosoda Masahiro	AIC	Key Animator
2009	Owly	Moto Sakakibara	Sprite Animation Studios	3D Animator
2010	The Qwaser of Stigmata: Portrait of an Empress	Kaneko Hiraku	Hoods Entertainment	Storyboard (ending animation)
2013	So, I Can't Play H!: Too Much Skin! The Swimsuit Contest	Sueda Yoshifumi	Feel	Supervision; Storyboard
2021	Resident Evil: Infinite Darkness	Eiichirō Hasumi	TMS Entertainment; Quebic	Executive Producer

==== Films ====
Year	Title	Director(s)	Studio	Role(s)
1991	Ranma ½: The Movie, Big Trouble in Nekonron, China	Iuchi Shuuji	Studio Deen	In-Between Animator
2010	Inazuma Eleven: Saikyō Gundan Ōga Shūrai	Miyao Yoshikazu	OLM, Inc.	Production Coordination
2011	Mahō Sensei Negima! Anime Final	Shinbou Akiyuki	Shaft; Studio Pastoral	Storyboard
2011	Inazuma Eleven GO: Kyūkyoku no Kizuna Griffon	Miyao Yoshikazu	OLM, Inc.	Stereoscopic Production Manager
2016	Cyborg 009: Call of Justice	Kenji Kamiyama; Koudai Kakimoto	OLM Digital	Production Coordination

==== Adult Anime ====
Year	Title	Director(s)	Studio	Role(s)
1996	Can Can Bunny Extra	Katsuma Kanazawa	Triple X	Key Animator
1998	Yu-No	Katsuma Kanazawa; Yagoshi Mamoru	PP Project	Animation Director
1999	Demon Warrior Koji	Urata Yasunori	Phoenix Entertainment	Key Animator (#1, 3)
2000	Luv Wave	Katsuma Kanazawa	Triple X	Key Animator (#3)
2001	El	Katsuma Kanazawa	Green Bunny	Supervision; Storyboard; Character Designer; Art Director
2001	Ryouki no Ori: Dai 2 Shou	Kon Nosei	Studio Kyuuma	Key Animator (#1)
2002	Kisaku the Letch	Yokoyama Hiromi	Himajin	Storyboard
2003	Houkago Mania Club: Koi no Hoshii no - The Animation	Fujimoto Yoshitaka; Shiranui Kai	Himajin	Storyboard (#1)
2003	Servant Princess	Fujimoto Yoshitaka	Himajin	Storyboard (#2)
2003	Wife Eater	Yokoyama Hiromi	Himajin	Storyboard
2004	Ikusa Otome Valkyrie	Hiromi Mosan	Himajin	Storyboard
2004	Kisaku Spirit: The Letch Lives	Yokoyama Hiromi	Himajin	Storyboard (#2)
2006	Sora no Iro, Mizu no Iro	Banzou Tokita	Himajin	Supervision (#1); Storyboard (#1)
