= The World of Narue =

Japanese manga and anime series

- First manga volume cover

成恵の世界 (Narue no Sekai)
- Genre: Romantic comedy, Science fiction
- Manga
- Written by: Tomohiro Marukawa
- Published by: Kadokawa Shoten
- English publisher: NA: CPM Manga
- Magazine: Shōnen Ace
- Original run: April 26, 1999 – December 26, 2012
- Volumes: 13
- Anime television series
- Directed by: Toyoo Ashida (chief); Hiromitsu Morita
- Written by: Yuu Sugitani
- Music by: Takayuki Negishi
- Studio: Studio Live (Note: Animation production assistance (アニメーション制作協力) for all episodes provided by Imagin.)
- Licensed by: NA: AEsir Holdings
- Original network: MBS, CBC, Chiba TV, Kids Station
- English network: NA: Anime Network; SG: Viki; US: AZN Television, ImaginAsian, Anime Selects
- Original run: April 4, 2003 – June 28, 2003
- Episodes: 12

The World of Narue (Japanese: 成恵の世界, Hepburn: Narue no Sekai) is a Japanese manga series written and illustrated by Tomohiro Marukawa. The series follows Kazuto Izuka, an alien girl named Narue Nanase and the trials and tribulations of the young couple as they get to know each other. The title is taken from A. E. van Vogt's The World of Null-A (非Aの世界, Naru ē no Sekai).

The manga, spanning 12 volumes as of August 2011, is authored by Tomohiro Marukawa and published by Kadokawa Shoten since 2000. The manga was licensed in North America by the now-defunct CPM Manga. In 2014, the manga received the Seiun Award for Best Comic.

An anime television series adaptation ran on MBS between April 4, 2003, and June 28, 2003. A six volume set would later release on both DVD and VHS in Japan. Central Park Media licensed and released the show on a four-disc DVD collection in 2004 under their US Manga Corps label. Following the 2009 bankruptcy and liquidation of Central Park Media, ADV Films picked up the anime series for release on July 21, 2009. Following the closure of A.D. Vision, the series is now distributed by successors Section23 Films and AEsir Holdings.

== Plot ==
Kazuto Izuka is an average 14-year-old boy who one day encounters an abandoned puppy that turns into a space alien creature but is saved by schoolmate named Narue Nanase. When he goes to thank her, he discovers she too is a space alien whose father was part of a galactic exploration team. With the encouragement of his friend, Masaki Maruo, Izuka asks Narue out on a date. Narue is reluctant at first, but after Kazuto confesses his love to her, and assures her that he is not bothered by her alien heritage, Narue agrees and they start dating. They must deal with classmates who do not look favorably upon aliens, including Hajime Yagi, Narue's classmate and ufologist, who does not believe Narue is really an alien and thinks that she is lying to get attention. Narue's half-sister Kanaka moves to Earth along with Kanaka's caretaker Bathyscaphe who is an android spaceship. They also interact with other assorted characters, some of whom are aliens.

== Characters ==
=== Main characters ===
Narue Nanase (七瀬 成恵, Nanase Narue)
Voiced by: Mamiko Noto (Japanese); Veronica Taylor (English)^{Ep. 1}
The titular heroine. Narue is a 14-year-old middle schooler who is half-alien: her father is from the Planet Nihon in the Galaxy Federation, while her mother is from Earth.^{Ep. 1, 3, 8} She is given the offer to go into space many times but thinks of Earth as her home and does not want to leave. She has an innocent personality and is delighted when Kazuto accepts her. She wears a headband that allows her to teleport herself and Kazuto.^{Ep. 1, 8}
Kazuto Iizuka (飯塚 和人, Izuka Kazuto)
Voiced by: Daisuke Sakaguchi (Japanese); Jamie McGonnigal (English)^{Ep. 1}
The main protagonist. Kazuto is a 14-year-old middle schooler who falls in love with Narue.^{Ep. 1} He has a kind personality and cares about people regardless of whether they are aliens or not.^{Ep. 1-2} He is an otaku whose favorite show is Magical Girl #4.^{Ep. 3, 10} Although he cannot swim, he goes to the pool with Narue and their friends.^{Ep. 7}
Masaki Maruo (丸尾 正樹, Maruo Masaki)
Voiced by: Jun Fukuyama (Japanese); Jimmy Zoppi (English)^{Ep. 1}
Kazuto's best friend with short greyish curly hair that looks like a buzzcut. When he learns Kazuto is going to go on a date with Narue, he gives him a bunch of social tips. He and Yagi have been neighbors since childhood.^{Ep. 2}
Hajime Yagi (八木 はじめ, Yagi Hajime)
Voiced by: Saeko Chiba (Japanese); Michele Knotz (English)^{Ep. 1}
Yagi is a Narue's classmate and Maruo's next-door neighbor. She has dark purple hair in braids, green eyes, and glasses. She thinks Narue is only pretending to be an alien in order to be popular, and acts hostile towards her, demanding that Narue prove she is an alien. She is regularly mocked by her classmates for her obsession with Narue as well as with aliens and UFOs in general.^{Ep. 2} She befriends Kanaka, who had trouble adjusting to school, and eventually she and Narue eventually get over their misunderstandings, partly due to Kanaka, and are able to become friends.^{Ep. 4, 5}

=== Main Characters' Classmate ===
Kyoko Kudo (工藤 杏子, Kudō Kyōko)
Voiced by: Kanako Tateno (Japanese); Lisa Ortiz (English)^{Ep. 2}
One of Narue's female classmates with blond hair and purple eyes. She is snobby and likes to bully Narue.^{Ep. 2}
Yuki Kashiwazaki (柏崎 ゆき, Kashiwazaki Yuki)
Voiced by: Yuuko Goto (Japanese); Mandy Bonhomme (English)^{Ep. 2}
Kyoko's friend with the short brown hair.^{Ep. 2}
Aya Kanazawa (金沢 あや, Kanazawa Aya)
Voiced by: Nami Kurokawa (Japanese); Catherine Kim (English)^{Ep. 2}
Kyoko's friend with short green hair.^{Ep. 2}
Akira Nitta (新田 昭, Nitta Akira)
One of Narue's male classmates, very short, and very withdrawn. Nitta idolizes Narue because she is one of the few people at school who treats him kindly. His adventures include finding and wearing Narue's teleportation headband - with humorous results - and exorcising a ghost with the help of Yagi and Kudo. Nitta is constantly on library duty because he hasn't the guts to demand his classmates take their turns. (Manga only)

=== Nanase's Family ===
Tadashi Nanase (七瀬 正, Nanase Tadashi)
Voiced by: Jun'ichi Sugawara, Shigeru Shibuya (age 30) (Japanese); Dan Green (English)^{Ep. 1, 8}
An alien from Planet Nihon of the Galaxy Federation who was sent to Earth to study its culture and people. Some time before his assignment to Earth 15 years ago, he had divorced his wife, with whom they raised their child Kanaka. At Earth, he worked various jobs including farming and police, but when he was recalled to return to Nihon, he refused and tried to escape, but almost drowned. He was rescued by Narumi Mutsuki, a human woman. He worked with her family, and eventually fell in love with her, and they had Narue as their daughter.^{Ep. 8}.
Kanaka Nanase (七瀬 香奈花, Nanase Kanaka)
Voiced by: Junko Minagawa (Japanese); Rachael Lillis (English)^{Ep. 3}
Kanaka is the older half-sister of Narue and a full-blooded alien. She has brown hair and purple eyes. She is younger (12 years old) than Narue when she shows up due to complications of the Urashima effect (time dilation).^{Ep. 4} Kanaka is surprised and confused at what has happened while she was away and acts rashly at first, causing trouble. She soon adjusts to her family on Earth, though Kanaka still has a bratty, mischievous personality.^{Ep. 5} Her parents divorced before her father went on the trip to Earth.^{Ep. 8}
Bathyscaphe (バチスカーフ (罰襟巻), Bachisukāfu)
Voiced by: Mami Kosuge (Japanese); Carol Jacobanis (English)^{Ep. 4}
Named after the ship of the same name, Bathyscaphe is Kanaka's caretaker. She has grey hair styled in a bun, yellow eyes, and typically wears a purple dress with high back collar.^{Ep. 4-5} She identifies herself as an android; her true form is a retired Escort Destroyer class starship.^{Ep. 6, 9}
Narumi Mutsuki (睦月成美 (also 鳴海むつき), Mutsuki Narumi)
Voiced by: Maria Kawamura (Japanese); Zoe Fries (English)^{Ep. 8}
Narue's human mother first met Tadashi Nanase when he was trying to flee from the Galaxy Federation and almost drowned. When she shares her daily frustrations with work and life, she learns that Tadashi is willing to listen to her. Her family takes him in as a farm worker, and she falls in love with him. She is also an aggressive driver.^{Ep. 8} Episode 8 of the anime is set six years after her death.^{Ep. 8}

=== Galaxy Federation ===
Tail Messa (テイルメッサー, Teiru Messā)
Voiced by: Tomomichi Nishimura (Japanese); Tristan Goddard (English)^{Ep. 3}
Head Inspector of the Galaxy Federation. He tries many times to persuade Narue to leave Earth and go to space, but seems to have a soft spot for Narue's family and friends. Tail Messa helped Narue's father emigrate from Planet Nihon when it became obvious convincing him otherwise was impossible,^{Ep. 8} and as Head Inspector he helped arrange for the Turugistani refugee ship Ninurta to settle on Planet Nihon, thus solving a sticky diplomatic — and romantic — situation that threatened to break up Narue and Kazuto.
Rin Asakura (朝倉 鈴, Asakura Rin)
Voiced by: Oma Ichimura (Japanese); Zoe Fries (English)^{Ep. 7}
Rin is the Intelligence Mecha android who works for the Head Inspector. She appears as Kazuto's little sister with blonde hair and a ponytail. She has the ability to send mind control pulses to manipulate people's feelings. When she first appeared, she tried to seduce Kazuto away from Narue (under orders from Tail Messa), but finds out that their bond is very strong and unbreakable.^{Ep. 6} In episode 9 of the anime, she uses her power to make people forget about the tsunami that was going to hit and that Haruna saved them.^{Ep. 9} Android space fighter used by Tail Messa to help defend Earth. After that she warms up to them and they become friends. Rin appears to draw mainly Earth-based duties.
Rei Otonashi (音無 麗, Otonashi Rei)
Voiced by: Natsuko Kuwatani (Japanese); Catherine Kim (English)^{Ep. 7}
Rei is a Strategic Mecha android who works for the Head Inspector. She has grey hair and wears a white dress.^{Ep. 6} Android space fighter used by Tail Mesa to help defend Earth. Rei is more composed than either Rin or Ran but when surprised she can fire missiles in an instant. Rei can transform her long hair and cap into a delta wing and radome for airborne surveillance duty.
Ran Tendo (天堂 蘭, Tendō Ran)
Voiced by: Tomoko Kawakami (Japanese); Vibe Jones (English)
Ran is a Tactical Mecha android who works for the Office of the Head Inspector. She has pink hair styled in twin tails and wears a pink shirt and shorts^{Ep. 6}. Android space fighter used by Tail Messa to help defend Earth. More pragmatic than Rin. Ran and Rei operate from the escort carrier Binten to defend Earth from, e.g., terrorists and berserker androids. Ran can fly by transforming her ponytails into twin propulsion units.

=== Other characters ===
Haruna (ハルナ)
Voiced by: Yumi Touma (Japanese); Angora Deb (English)^{Ep. 9}
Haruna is a Fast Escort Destroyer class starship that has gone AWOL and is hiding out in human form as a waitress at a beach restaurant. She was frightened to meet Bathyscaphe, but the latter assured her that as a retired ship she is not obligated and will not report Haruna to the alien authorities.^{Ep. 9} In a later episode, Haruna moves in with the proprietor of the beach restaurant and Narue's friends give them a wedding ceremony.^{Ep. 11}
Magical Girl #4 (魔砲少女四号ちゃん, Mahō Shōjō Yongōchan)
Voiced by: Sakura Nogawa (Japanese); Lisa Ortiz (English)^{Ep. 3, Ep. 10}
Heroine of the eponymous anime television series show that Kazuto likes. Manaka Oatari (大当 真名花, Daitō Manaka) transforms from a serious archery club member to Magical Girl #4, the Magical Girl of Love and Peace. She wears a blue and white costume with golden shoulder guards and a lance. A later episode involves Magical Girl #4's voice actor Kiriri Kaibashira, a middle schooler who liked making Narue jealous by flirting with Kazuto.^{Ep. 10}
Avalon Assassin (アバロン人, Avalon Hito)
Voiced by: Yasuhiko Kawazu (Japanese); Tristan Goddard (English)^{Ep. 1, 12}
A space ninja and terrorist from Avalon, he impersonates a puppy and attacks Kazuto in the first episode but is defeated by Narue. He then goes after Narue's father but is defeated again. He returns in the final episode.^{Ep. 1, 12}

== Episode list ==
No.	Title	Original release date
1	"My Girlfriend is an Alien" "Boku no Kanojo wa Uchūjin" (ボクの彼女は宇宙人)	April 5, 2003
On a rainy day after school, Kazuto Izuka sees a stray dog in a box on his way to school. Afterwards, when he tries to pick it up, the dog turns into a monster. He is saved by a girl who hits the creature with a baseball bat, but she runs off and leaves her baseball bat behind. Kazuto and his friend Masaki Maruo learn the girl is Narue Nanase, a schoolmate in a neighboring class. Narue is rumored to be an alien, but schoolmate Hajime Yagi disbelieves such a thing. With Maruo's help, Kazuto follows Narue to return the baseball bat to her and asks her out for tea while thanking her for saving him the day before. When she takes him to her place, they discover that her father Tadashi Nanase is held captive by a space ninja, who was disguised as the dog monster from before. After Narue defeats the ninja with her baseball bat, she asks if Kazuto is okay with her being an alien, and then shows him her people's starship fleet.
2	"The First Date" "Hajimete no Dēto" (はじめてのデート)	April 12, 2003
Kazuto shares with Maruo about what happened at Narue's house and that they are going to go on a date. Maruo gives Kazuto some dating advice, including not going Dutch and not visiting video game arcades. Meanwhile, Yagi feels let down for being made fun of by Kyoko Kudo for her interest in extraterrestrial life. The next day, as Kazuto and Narue enjoy their date at the mall, where they end up visiting the arcade and going Dutch on lunch, Maruo discreetly monitors them, only for Yagi to crash in on them, accusing Narue of faking her identity as an alien in order to be popular. Kazuto loses his movie tickets but recover them at the arcade they visited earlier. During the movie, Narue falls asleep, much to Kazuto's nervousness. However, after the movie, she apologizes to him for doing so. At night, a depressed Yagi is cheered up by Maruo, who tells her to look at an aurora that fills the starry sky. Although Narue could have teleported home, she walks with Kazuto home.
3	"A Secret Base for Two" "Futari no Himitsu Kichi" (二人の秘密基地)	April 19, 2003
Narue has Kazuto invite her to his place, where his mother and sister are surprised that Kazuto has brought a girl to their house for the first time, much to Kazuto's embarrassment. In his bedroom, Kazuto shows Narue how his computer works, from turning on the operating system to printing out a screensaver. However, Kazuto's mother and sister each bring coffee and cookies, interrupting his special moment with Narue. Afterwards, Kazuto shows Narue his favorite anime series called "Magical Girl #4". Narue then takes Kazuto to her secret spot, which happens to be a mountainside area, where they lay on the grass under the starry sky. But Narue notices Kazuto is asleep and was placed in a time stasis shield. Tail Messa, the head inspector of the Galaxy Federation, tells Narue that she and Tadashi must soon leave this world and return to the planet Nihon. Kazuto wakes up in his bedroom, where a mountain rock is left sitting on the table.
4	"My Younger Older Sister" "Toshishita no Oneechan" (年下のお姉ちゃん)	April 26, 2003
Narue learns that her older sister, Kanaka Nanase, exists and is coming to visit with her caretaker, Bathyscaphe. When Kanaka goes to see Tadashi, she mistakes Narue as his wife, making her very angry and causing her to run away. When she checks back with Bathyscaphe in her escort ship, she realizes that Narue is her little sister who is dating Kazuto. After Bathyscaphe beams Kazuto up into the escort ship, Kanaka learns that Narue is technically older than her due to the Urashima effect. Bathyscaphe lands the escort ship, reconfiguring it into a house. After Narue tells Kazuto about her late mother, she visits Kanaka, who is upset about how much Tadashi has changed over the years. As Narue tries to restrain her, she accidentally shocks Narue with her stun gun, leaving Narue with a high fever. Kanaka, who believes that no one cares about her, is told by Kazuto that Narue was really looking forward to meeting her. The four wait all night long until Narue wakes up the next day, much to Kanaka's happiness.
5	"Kanaka Goes to School" "Kanaka Gakkō e Iku" (香奈花学校へ行く)	May 3, 2003
Kanaka will start attending school the next day. At night, Kanaka finds Yagi, who heard of an unidentified flying object sighting the day before, unbeknownst it was Bathyscaphe's escort ship. To please Yagi, Kanaka has Bathyscaphe project an image of the escort ship in the sky to seem believable. Before school begins, Yagi haggles Kazuto about his encounter with starships, much to his annoyance. Kanaka is having a hard time adjusting to school life. Kyoko continue to bully Yagi by writing a message about her and Kazuto on the chalkboard, but Narue shows up to erase the message and leaves without saying a word. Yagi befriends Kanaka and later invites her over to hang out at her place all afternoon, but Narue is told by Bathyscaphe to retrieve Kanaka. Yagi now knows that Narue and Kanaka are related, which is a letdown on her part. When the two teleport back to the house in the evening, Kanaka slaps Narue and tells her that Yagi has been the only one who has treated her right from the beginning. The next morning, Kanaka, taking Kazuto with her, helps Narue and Yagi get along as they all walk to school.
6	"The Impact of Love" "Koi wa Inpakuto!" (恋はインパクト)	May 10, 2003
Kazuto wakes up the next morning only to meet a young girl by the name of Rin Asakura, who claims to be his little sister, unaware of her unusual powers of influence. When Narue sees them walking to school together, she suddenly feels unhappy and worried. Narue runs to the school roof and Yagi, who follows her there, notes that Narue is having feelings of jealousy towards Kazuto. When school lets out, after Rin uses her powers to calm down many students arguing over her, she takes Kazuto with her down the street. She reveals that she is from outer space and that she has been watching him all along. Bathyscaphe has detected mind control pulses coming from Rin, who is really an android. When Narue teleports to their location, Rin nearly forces Kazuto to kiss her in front of Narue. However, when Kazuto manages to reject Rin, she begins to malfunction and fall over onto the road. It is shown that Messa assigned Rin to bring Narue back to Nihon. When an oncoming truck approaches, Rin snaps out of it and rescues Kazuto from being run over. Although she failed her mission, she realizes how much Kazuto really loves Narue, before departing back to Messa independently. Narue shares a kiss with Kazuto, much to his surprise.
7	"The Pool: Clear Danger!" "Pūru!? Kiki Sanpatsu" (プール！？危機三発)	May 17, 2003
Complaining about the hot summer weather, Kanaka decides that she and her friends should go to the public swimming pool to relax. However, the place is overcrowded with people, so she uses a wristband device signalling to a round receiver to find an uncrowded place to swim. Since Kazuto cannot swim, Kanaka gives him a mysterious hair gel that allows him to swim, but it backfires when he swims too fast. Kanaka uses her wristband device again to take the others to a beach on a secluded island. While Kazuto and Narue are building a sand castle and Maruo and Yagi are exploring the place with exotic animals, Kanaka is seen riding a mammoth, chasing the four to a cave. Kanaka soon falls off the mammoth and damages her wristband device, separating Maruo and Yagi from Kazuto and Narue on the island. Maruo and Yagi later find Kazuto and Narue crossing a bridge, but it breaks and Narue falls into the water. Kazuto jumps in to save her, but they both drop into a waterfall. They are miraculously saved by Bathyscaphe, who interrupts their adventure and returns everything back to normal. Due to her misbehavior, Kanaka has her wristband device confiscated by Bathyscaphe, who states that they were all involved in a virtual reality game.
8	"A Message From Earth" "Chikyū kara no Messēji" (地球からのメッセージ)	May 24, 2003
Kazuto, Narue, Kanaka and Bathyscaphe have lunch when the subject of Narue's late mother comes up, Narue tells the backstory of how Tadashi first met Narumi Mutsuki. Fifteen years ago, Tadashi had been assigned as a cultural investigator for the Galaxy Federation, but Messa had come to tell him that his assignment was cancelled and that he must return to Nihon. However, a frightened Tadashi fell into a streaming river, washing up on the other side, where Narumi carried him back to her home. There, he spent a few days with her, and they eventually fell in love with each other. Tadashi explained to Narumi that he was an alien studying how the various cultures and populations of Earth can coincide peacefully, contrasting from that of Nihon. Messa, having tracked down Tadashi to bring him back to Nihon, was outsmarted when Narumi suddenly appeared and drove off with Tadashi. Moreover, Rei Otonashi and Ran Tendo, two androids under Messa, were unable to catch them when they crossed through a forest. To this day, Messa allowed Tadashi to live peacefully on Earth with Narumi even after she had died.
9	"A Starship in Love" "Koisuru Hoshi-bune" (恋する星船)	May 31, 2003
Kazuto, Narue, Kanaka and Bathyscaphe go to the beach. While Kazuto and Narue plan to collect seashells in the ocean, Kanaka and Bathyscaphe encounter Haruna, an exiled alien starship disguised as a human woman who now works as a waitress at a beach front cafe. Haruna fears that Bathyscaphe would report her, but the latter is a retired escort ship, thus not obligated to do so. Haruna recalls to when she first landed on the beach at nightfall and hid her starship form, later falling in love with Akio Shimada, the manager of the beach front cafe. When a tsunami occurs, Haruna reveals her disguise and calms the waves. During this time, Bathyscaphe saves Kazuto from drowning in the ocean. Even though Akio now knows that Haruna is a starship, he still wants to be with her forever. The next day, it is revealed that Rin erased the memories of the bystanders who witnessed Haruna destroying the tsunami. Rin, who was supposed to return Haruna to military service, no longer needs to worry about tracking her down anymore. Narue is sad that all of her seashells got lost in the tsunami, much to the amusement of everyone else.
10	"The Great Cosplay Plan!" "Kosupure Daisakusen" (コスプレ大作戦)	June 7, 2003
Kazuto and Narue are supposed to go on a date together, but Kazuto instead goes to a cosplay expo, which features Kiriri Kaibashira, the voice actress for Magical Girl #4. Kazuto is overjoyed to finally meet Kiriri in person, but Narue becomes fed up, especially due to Kiriri's snotty attitude towards her, which causes her to walk away. Narue has no one else to turn to until she finds Yagi, who helps her research about cosplay. The two later cross paths with Kiriri, who tells them about an upcoming cosplay contest in the weekend, mentioning that she invited Kazuto to participate as a judge. This encourages Narue to enter the contest and make her own costume, with the help of Yagi, to impress Kazuto and to show Kiriri up. Meanwhile, Kazuto feels that Narue has been avoiding him for the past few days, giving him much concern. As time is soon running out, Yagi and Narue beg Maruo to help them make the armor and cannon of the costume overnight. During the contest, Narue makes a stunning appearance on stage and pleases the crowd, but Kazuto faints at the sight of this. He wakes up backstage with Narue at his side. Even though Narue wins the contest, yet does not accept the prize money, Kazuto tells her that he likes her just the way she is.
11	"A Private Little Wedding" "Chīsa na Kekkonshiki" (小さな結婚式)	June 14, 2003
Kazuto, Narue, Maruo, Yagi and Kanaka are cram studying for the midterm exams. Not before long, Kanaka receives a letter from Haruna, who invites them all to visit Akio's family onsen following the midterm exams. After a warm welcome by Haruna, they all relax in the hot springs, and hilarity ensues as Maruo, who tries to take a peek, realizes that the girls' bath is over the boys' bath. After they all enjoy a nicely cooked dinner, the subject about the possibility of Haruna and Akio getting married is brought up, though an alien starship being wedded with a human seems to be quite a complicated matter. Narue comes up with a plot to have her friends arrange an unofficial marriage. While Kazuto and Narue go outside to retrieve some flowers in the mountains, Bathyscaphe convinces a worried Kanaka that her mother and father were happily married. The next day, Akio is taken by surprise when he sees Haruna in a wedding dress. The wedding takes place, and the groom kisses the bride. Narue wants to become a bride one day, just like her late mother.
12	"The Night Of The Festival" "Matsuri no Yoru" (祭の夜)	June 21, 2003
Kazuto and Narue meet up with Maruo and Yagi at a local festival. After playing some carnival games and paying respects at a local shrine, Kazuto and Narue are surrounded by space ninjas who initiate a time stasis shield in the area. When three space ninjas attack them, Rin intercepts and allows Kazuto and Narue to escape into the forest. Rin explains to the two that a starship piloted by space ninjas forced its way through a stargate, targeting Kazuto and Narue. Kanaka, Bathyscaphe and Tadashi, who all later show up to the local festival, find out about the time stasis shield. After Rin gives Kazuto and Narue each a versatile weapon, the three space ninjas catch up to them. Kazuto and Narue struggle to fight against the space ninjas. Bathyscaphe manages to capture one of the space ninjas, while Rei and Ran arrives to capture the other two space ninjas. However, Ran, infected with a berserker virus, betrays the group and tries to kill Narue. Rin has no choice but to shock Ran, after having shot Rei, who shielded Narue from a blast. With the space ninjas detained, Messa appears to confirm if Kazuto is truly willing to stay by Narue's side no matter the risk. After Messa leaves, the time stasis shield is lifted, and fireworks begin to burst in the sky.

== Manga volumes ==
No.	Original release date	Original ISBN	English release date	English ISBN
1	June 28, 2000	4-04-713346-9	May 2004	1-58664-961-2
2	September 25, 2000	4-04-713365-5	September 2004	1-58664-962-0
3	April 25, 2001	4-04-713416-3	November 2004	1-58664-963-9
4	February 26, 2002	4-04-713477-5	January 11, 2006	1-58664-964-7
5	December 12, 2002	4-04-713516-X	N/A	1-57800-725-9
6	March 1, 2004	4-04-713601-8	—	—
7	December 25, 2004	4-04-713679-4	—	—
8	July 26, 2005	4-04-713736-7	—	—
9	October 26, 2006	4-04-713882-7	—	—
10	March 26, 2008	978-4-04-715039-3	—	—
11	May 26, 2010	978-4-04-715455-1	—	—
12	August 8, 2011	978-4-04-715762-0	—	—
13	February 26, 2013	978-4-04-120589-1	—	—

Note: Only the first 3 volumes were released in US bookstores and are currently out of print. The 4th and 5th volume only saw limited releases through online orders. Since the closure of CPM, the manga has not been picked up by another US publisher.

== Works cited ==
- "Ch." is shortened form for chapter and refers to a chapter number of The World of Narue manga.
- "Ep." is shortened form for episode and refers to an episode number in The World of Narue anime.
