= Love Love? =

Japanese anime television series

- Cover art for Love Love? found on the DVD, CD album track and promotional posters

ラブラブ？ (Raburabu?)
- Genre: Comedy, harem
- Anime television series
- Directed by: Takeo Takahashi
- Produced by: Akio Sakai; Masanobu Arakawa; Toyoo Ashida
- Written by: Naruhisa Arakawa
- Music by: Toshihiko Sahashi
- Studio: Imagin; Studio Live
- Licensed by: NA: Maiden Japan
- Original network: Sun TV, TV Kanagawa
- Original run: May 3, 2004 – June 28, 2004
- Episodes: 9 + 4 OVA

Love Love? (stylized as LOVE♥LOVE?) is a Japanese anime television series directed by Takeo Takahashi. It is a sequel to the series Hit o Nerae! (Smash Hit), with character design by Miwa Oshima. The plot centers on the relationships between screenwriter Naoto Ohizumi, and the all-female cast of a Super Sentai TV show he works on.

The series was broadcast on Sun TV and TV Kanagawa from May 3, 2004, to June 28, 2004. An additional 4 episodes were released as straight to DVD OVAs.

== Premise ==
Naoto Ohizumi is the screenwriter for the all-female Super Sentai TV show, The Super Transforming Cosmopolitan Prayers ("Cosprayers"), although this is only known by the show's producer. Naoto has a crush on one of the show's stars, Natsumi Yagami. As the show proceeds so does their relationship, with many twists and turns along the way. Many of the other actresses are also in love with Naoto, creating various situations throughout the anime.

== Characters ==
Naoto Ohizumi (大泉直人, Ooizumi Naoto)
Voiced by: Mamoru Miyano
Naoto is the main protagonist of the series. He is a 17-year-old script writer of the fictional children's TV show Cosprayers, although apparently only the show's producer, Mitsuki Ikita, is aware of this. To the rest of the cast he is simply the Making Of camera man. It is later revealed that the whole cast had secretly known that Naoto was the script writer from that start. During the first episode he has an intimate encounter with each of the show's actresses and he gradually starts developing feelings for the show's main heroine, Natsumi Yagami.
Natsumi Yagami (八神莱摘, Yagami Natsumi)
Voiced by: Miyu Matsuki
Natsumi is the main protagonist of Cho Henshin CosPrayers. She stars in Cosprayers as Miko Red Rayer (Koto Hoshino). She is 17 years of age and is under the belief that she was only enlisted for her looks and that her acting is of poor quality. Yagami is aware that Naoto is the screenwriter and seduces him for more roles. She falls in love with him after she sees how much of a good person he is.
Youko Katsuragi (桂木洋子, Katsuragi Youko)
Voiced by: Sanae Kobayashi
She is the 17-year-old that plays the part of Sister Blue Rayer (Scarlet Church) in Cosprayers. She is quite the opposite of her rival Natsumi for although she is confident in her acting skills, she is unsure of her looks. Katsuragi is aware that Naoto is the screenwriter and seduces him for more roles. She ends up developing feelings for Naoto.
Hikaru Jougasaki (城ヶ崎ヒカル, Jougasaki Hikaru)
Voiced by: Sayaka Ohara
Plays Sari Yellow Rayer (Priscilla) in Cosprayers. She is a 14-year-old tomboy, who grew up with 6 older brothers. Jougasaki is aware that Naoto is the screenwriter and tries to seduce Naoto but fails.
Sayaka Imamura (今村さやか, Imamura Sayaka)
Voiced by: Mayumi Yoshida
She plays the part of Rabian Pink/Purple Rayer (Remy) in Cosprayers and is especially skilled at imitating voices. Her short height and childish behavior commonly lead people to believe she is younger than her actual age of 14. Inamura is aware that Naoto is the screenwriter, she also has feelings for Naoto and get frustrated because he never notices her.
Miku Hayasaka (早坂みく, Hayasaka Miku)
Voiced by: Kiyomi Asai
At age 11, she is the youngest member of the cast, starring as Dian Green Rayer (Dian Iko). She has a fear of heights which frequently causes problems during stunts. She actually likes the producer nicknamed Dracula. Hayasaka is aware that Naoto is the screenwriter.
Mitsuki Ikuta (生田美月, Ikuta Mitsuki)
Voiced by: Mamiko Noto
Mitsuki is the main protagonist of Hit wo Nerae!. She is often mistaken for a grade schooler due to her height and appearance and is the show's producer.

== Anime ==
Love Love? was produced by m.o.e. and directed by Takeo Takahashi, with character designs by Miwa Oshima and music by Toshihiko Sahashi. The opening theme was "(LOVE)∞" by Miyu Matsuki, Sanae Kobayashi, Sayaka Ohara, Mayumi Yoshida, and Kiyomi Asai, and the closing theme was "Only You" by Ayano Ahane. The series was licensed for a release in North America, released in May 2013.

The series was broadcast on Sun TV and TV Kanagawa between May 3, 2004, and June 28, 2004. An additional 4 episodes never aired, but were instead released as straight to DVD OVAs. The series was released on 4 DVDs between July 14, 2004, and September 1, 2004.

No.	Title	Original release date
1	"Wetting the Sands of March"; Transliteration: "Sangatsu no Nuretasuna" (Japanese: 三月の濡れた砂)	May 3, 2004
2	"June - Country of Dreams"; Transliteration: "Rokugatsu - Yume no Kuni" (Japanese: 六月 - 夢の国)	May 10, 2004
3	"Inside the Campus of August"; Transliteration: "Kōtei ni Inai Hachigatsu" (Japanese: 校庭にいない八月)	May 17, 2004
4	"Sky of September..."; Transliteration: "Kugatsu no Sora" (Japanese: 九月の空)	May 24, 2004
5	"Men Are Without Patience"; Transliteration: "Otoko wa sore o Gaman Dekinai" (Japanese: 男はそれを我慢できない)	May 31, 2004
6	"A Man Who Is Understood Too Well"; Transliteration: "Shira re Sugite Ita Otoko" (Japanese: 知られすぎていた男)	June 7, 2004
7	"The Days of Love and Reminiscence"; Transliteration: "Ai to Suio Ku no Hibi" (Japanese: 愛と追憶の日々)	June 14, 2004
8	"Youth Without Repentance"; Transliteration: "Waga Seishin ni Kui Nashi" (Japanese: わが青春に悔いなし)	June 21, 2004
9	"Inside the Shining Storm"; Transliteration: "Arashi no Naka de Kagayaite" (Japanese: 嵐の中で輝いて)	June 28, 2004
10	"July Rhapsody"; Transliteration: "Shichigatsu no Kyōshikyoku" (Japanese: 七月の狂詩曲)	July 14, 2004
11	"If it becomes September..."; Transliteration: "Kugatsu ni Nareba" (Japanese: 九月になれば)	August 4, 2004
12	"Actress dropped into Hell"; Transliteration: "Jigoku ni Ochita Joyū-domo" (Japanese: 地獄に堕ちた女優ども)	August 18, 2004
13	"History Is Made Through Women"; Transliteration: "Rekishi wa On'na de Tsukurareru" (Japanese: 歴史は女で作られる)	September 1, 2004

== See also ==
- Cho Henshin CosPrayers
