= List of Hoshizora e Kakaru Hashi characters =

The following lists the cast of characters from the visual novel Hoshizora e Kakaru Hashi and its animated adaptation.

== Primary characters ==
Kazuma Hoshino (星野 一馬, Hoshino Kazuma)
Voiced by: Shintaro Asanuma
Kazuma Hoshino is the main protagonist of the series and second-year high school student. A rather ordinary, though warmhearted teenage boy, he moves from the city and into the countryside for the sake of his brother Ayumu's delicate health. Over time, his kind nature earn him the respect and even affections of his female companions. Initially he is unaware that he spent some of his childhood in Yamabaki. However, certain events trigger occasional flashbacks. He soon develops feelings for Ui. Furthermore, he was a regular player of the tennis club before coming to the countryside, so his athletic ability is very good.
Ui Nakatsugawa (中津川 初, Nakatsugawa Ui)
Voiced by: Eriko Nakamura, credited as Maki Hibino in the game
Lively and upbeat, Ui Nakatsugawa is a second-year high school student who is arguably the most iconic character of the series. An energetic, carefree individual, Ui is fun, outgoing and adored by everyone, though she is relatively naive compared to her peers. Of her most outward traits, Ui has an outrageous appetite for food. She soon develops feelings for Kazuma.
Ibuki Hinata (日向 伊吹, Hinata Ibuki)
Voiced by: Ringo Aoba
Ibuki Hinata is a second-year student, her class representative, and Ui's best friend. In addition to performing well academically and her duties on the student council, she is also an active member of the archery club, having practiced the sport since middle school. She is initially suspicious of Kazuma but, due to his kindness she ultimately develops a soft-spot for him. Although Ibuki can be tough and difficult, she can be particularly tender and shy.
Madoka Koumoto (神本 円佳, Kōmoto Madoka)
Voiced by: Ai Shimizu, credited as Asuka Isuzu in the game
Madoka Koumoto is a shy first-year high school student, who outside of her time at school, doubles as the local Shinto shrine miko. She can often be found sweeping leaves off the sandō, reading books to children at the Yamabiko library or, less commonly, in the company of friends. Having grown up under sheltered circumstances, Madoka dresses old-fashioned clothes and is mildly androphobic. Having met and played with Kazuma when he was last in Yamabiko, her history with him is the longest of anyone, spanning at least a decade. Madoka enjoys writing and is skilled at nage-waza and is in love with Kazuma.
Tsumugi Toudou (藤堂 つむぎ, Tōdō Tsumugi)
Voiced by: Chiaki Takahashi, credited as Ran Suzuki in the game
Tsumugi is a third-year high school student and one of the most respectable cast members. A gentle, down-home country girl, Tsumugi is courteous, knowledgeable and acts as a sort of mediator for those around her. Tsumugi is a lover of nature and the rural life, enforced by her part-time work at the Yorozuyo Inn. She is the oldest of three sisters, including Koyori and Kasane Toudou. With a brassiere size of F, Tsumugi sports the largest bust of the female cast.
Hina Sakai (酒井 陽菜, Sakai Hina)
Voiced by: Mayumi Yoshida, credited as Misono Moriya in the game
Hina Sakai is a third-year high school student who has a calm and aloof character that gives her a mysterious air for which she is well known and admired at school. Her encounter with Kazuma, and the time she spends with him and the group serve to bring her out of her shell. In contrast to her refined image, Hina adores anything cute, especially plush toys. Her parents own a famous distillery, and she wants to go to university to study marketing and so help the family business. Of the entire cast, Hina is the tallest character.
Koyori Toudou (藤堂 こより, Tōdō Koyori)
Voiced by: Aiko Ōkubo, credited as Ichigo Momoi in the game
Koyori Toudou is a first-year high school student and the very active younger sister of Tsumugi. An animated, headstrong, tenacious and often loud girl, Koyori, much like Ibuki, does not welcome Kazuma with open arms. However, after he cushions her fall from a tree, among other actions, she has a change of heart. In spite of her almost spitfire disposition, Koyori enjoys helping others and appreciates those who help her. With the exception of Kasane, Koyori is the shortest character of the main cast.

== Secondary characters ==
Ayumu Hoshino (星野 歩, Hoshino Ayumu)
Voiced by: Ayuru Ōhashi, credited as Ui in the game
Ayumu Hoshino is the adorable younger brother of Kazuma. An affectionate little boy, he moves with Kazuma into the countryside on behalf of his asthma and meek health, and like his older sibling, enrolls in school. Much like Kazuma, Ayumu is friendly, altruistic and gregarious. Of his many hobbies, Ayumu enjoys drawing.
Kasane Toudou (藤堂 かさね, Toudou Kasane)
Voiced by: Mai Kadowaki, credited as Mitsu Anzu in the game
Kasane Toudou is a middle school student who is Tsumugi and Koyori's youngest sister. Cheery and playful, Kasane is best known for indulging in the rumor and gossip of the town, earning her the nickname "Fast ears". Kasane is a fellow schoolmate of Ayumu and is a good friend of his.
Daigo Minamikokubaru (南国原 大吾, Minamikokubaru Daigo)
Voiced by: Wataru Hatano, credited as Kaze Haruno in the game
Spirited and somewhat eccentric, Daigo Minamikokubaru is a second-year student. A classmate, he befriends Kazuma almost immediately on his first day of the school, acquainting him with the campus and even the profiles of some of the girls he meets; jealous of his unintentional success with women. As a sign of brethren respect, he frequently addresses Kazuma "brother". Daigo is the son of the second-year homeroom instructor.
Minamikokubaru sensei (南国原先生, Sensei Minamikokubaru)
Voiced by: Masako Katsuki
Class teacher of Kazuma and his class and father of Daigo. His first name is unknown. In AA, it is revealed that he was also Chika's teacher during his school days. In the anime and manga versions, Daigo's mother is his teacher, so she does not appear in either the anime or manga.
Senka Yorozu (万 千歌, Yorozu Senka)
Voiced by: Shiho Kawaragi, credited as Kaname Yuzuki in the game
Senka Yorozu is the titular owner of the Yorozuyo Inn. A friendly and hospitable woman, Senka, a friend of Kazuma and Ayumu's father, warmly welcomes the boys to live with her when they travel to Yamabiko. Though she is giving and considerate, Senka does not tolerate nonsense of any kind from anyone, including her guests. She does however have a mischievous side to her and does enjoy drinking.

Yūka Dan (団 優歌 / Dan Yūka). Yūka Dai (結花 ダイ / Dai Yūka). Voice actress: Tamura Yukari (anime).

Appeared in the OVA version. Heroine of Daigo's side. A freshman at the school who is Daigo's network playmate, Yūka herself. In the game version, only her name appears in Daigo's mouth. In Hoshizora and Ikiru Hashi AA, due to differences between the game and anime versions, the events of the OVA are treated as Daigo's dream, so Yūka's true identity in the game version is not her. In the Summer Festival arc, it is revealed that she appears to have been a man.
