= Harem Camp! =

Japanese manga series

- Cover of Harem Camp! volume 1 by Suiseisha

ハーレムきゃんぷっ！ (Hāremu Kyanputsu!)
- Genre: Harem; Romantic comedy
- Manga
- Written by: YUUKI HB
- Published by: Suiseisha
- English publisher: NA: Seven Seas Entertainment
- Imprint: Comic Goichi
- Magazine: ComicFesta
- Original run: June 13, 2021 – present
- Volumes: 10
- Anime television series
- Directed by: Toshihiro Watase
- Produced by: Tatsurou Murai
- Written by: Eeyo Kurosaki
- Studio: Studio Hōkiboshi
- Licensed by: OceanVeil
- Original network: Tokyo MX, BS11
- Original run: October 2, 2022 – December 5, 2022
- Episodes: 8

Harem Camp! (ハーレムきゃんぷっ！, Hāremu Kyanputsu!) is a Japanese manga series by YUUKI HB. It has been serialized online via Suiseisha' ComicFesta website since June 2021. It has been collected in ten tankōbon volumes. An anime television series adaptation by Studio Hōkiboshi aired from October to December 2022.

== Plot ==
Kensuke Yamamichi, a man passionate about camping, encounters four high school girls during a camping trip, with the four offering him to spend the night with them. Kensuke finds spending the night with them difficult, imagining himself being in erotic situations with them. Soon after, Kensuke starts his new job as a substitute teacher, only to find out that the four girls are now his students.

== Characters ==
Kensuke Yamamichi (山道 健介, Yamamichi Kensuke)
Voiced by: Masahito (Japanese); Alex Ross (English)
A man who has just started his job as a substitute teacher, as the regular teacher has gone on maternity leave. He finds himself in erotic situations with the other girls and has sex with them.
Haruki Azuma (東間 ハルキ, Azuma Haruki)
Voiced by: Miu Yuzuhara (Japanese); Elsie Lovelock (English)
A tomboyish high school student with a tsundere personality. Kensuke initially mistook her for a man when they first met. Despite her personality, she eventually develops feelings for Kensuke.
Aki Minami (南 愛生, Minami Aki)
Voiced by: Yuka Hinata (Japanese); Jingle Deleon (English)
Tōko Saionji (西園寺 橙子, Saionji Tōko)
Voiced by: Mashiro Kazahana (Japanese); Aife (English)
Natsuki Kitamura (北村 奈月, Kitamura Natsuki)
Voiced by: Ren Sagami (Japanese); Blythe Renay (English)

== Media ==
=== Manga ===
Written and illustrated by Yuuki HB, Harem Camp! began serialization on Suiseisha's ComicFesta website on June 13, 2021. Its chapters have been compiled into ten tankōbon volumes as of November 2026.

The series' chapters are published in English on WWWave Corporation's Coolmic website. In October 2025, Seven Seas Entertainment announced that they had licensed the series for English publication beginning in October 2026.

No.	Original release date	Original ISBN	English release date	English ISBN
1	September 16, 2022 (digital); January 18, 2024 (print)	978-4-434-33100-8	October 6, 2026	979-8-89863-185-7
2	September 16, 2022 (digital); January 18, 2024 (print)	978-4-434-33101-5	January 26, 2027	979-8-89863-186-4
3	March 3, 2023 (digital); March 18, 2024 (print)	978-4-434-33183-1	May 4, 2027	979-8-89863-300-4
4	March 18, 2024	978-4-434-33184-8	—	—
5	September 8, 2024	978-4-434-34108-3	—	—
6	January 17, 2025	978-4-434-34747-4	—	—
7	June 18, 2025	978-4-434-35552-3	—	—
8	November 18, 2025	978-4-434-36327-6	—	—
9	May 18, 2026	978-4-434-37415-9	—	—
10	November 18, 2026	978-4-434-38370-0	—	—

=== Anime ===
An anime television series adaptation by Studio Hōkiboshi aired from October 2 to December 5, 2022. It is directed by Toshihiro Watase and written by Eeyo Kurosaki, with Kazuya Kuroda as character designer and chief animation director. An English dub was released on September 18, 2026 on the OceanVeil streaming service.
