= Toyoo Ashida =

Japanese animator (1944–2011)

- Born: April 21, 1944; Chiba, Japan
- Died: July 23, 2011 (aged 67)
- Other names: Monta Ibu (伊武 紋太 Ibu Monta); Yutaka Egota (江古田 豊 Egota Yutaka)
- Occupations: anime director, character designer, animator, screenwriter
- Years active: 1965–2009
- Website: http://www3.ocn.ne.jp/~indoli/

Toyoo Ashida (芦田 豊雄, Ashida Toyoo; April 21, 1944 – July 23, 2011) was a Japanese anime character designer, animator and director. He was most notable for directing the original Vampire Hunter D anime, as well as for providing character designs for Vifam, Mashin Hero Wataru, Minky Momo and F-Zero GP Legend. He is the founder of the anime production studio, Studio Live and as well as the Japanese Animation Creators Association (JAniCA) along with Satoshi Kon.

His designs are similar to those of Akira Toriyama. Toyoo got his style while working on Dr. Slump.

He was also heavily inspired by Tex Avery, Bob Clampett, the Fleischer Brothers, Harvey Kurtzman and Jack Davis.

== Notable works as character design and animator ==
- Space Boy Soran (1965) (in-between animation)
- Bōken Gabotenjima (1967) (animation)
- Moomin (1969) (animation director)
- Cleopatra (1970) (animation)
- New Moomin (1972) (animation director)
- Wansa-kun (1973) (art director)
- Heidi, Girl of the Alps (1974) (co-character design and animation director)
- Space Battleship Yamato Series (1974) (animation director on the series from 1974 to 1981)
- Candy Candy (1976) (animation director)
- UFO Warrior Dai Apolon (1976–1977) (character design)
- Manga Sekai Mukashi Banashi (1976–1979) (animation director)
- Jetter Mars (1977) (animation director)
- Manga Nihon Emaki (1977) (animation director and storyboard, also director of episode 30)
- Yatterman (1977) (animation director)
- Cyborg 009 (1979) (character design)
- Zendaman (1979) (animation supervisor and animation director)
- Muteking, The Dashing Warrior (1980) (animation director)
- Maeterlinck's Blue Bird (1980) (co-character design)
- Dr. Slump and Arale-chan (1981) (animation director and animation supervisor)
- Ulysses 31 (1981) (animation director)
- Space Warrior Baldios: the Movie (1981) (animation director)
- Kyoufu Densetsu – Kaiki! Frankenstein (1981) (animation and design)
- Fairy Princess Minky Momo (1982–1994) (series character design)
- Ginga Hyōryū Vifam (1983–1998) (series character design)
- Doctor Mambo vs. Kaitō Jibako – Uchū yori Ai o Komete (1983) (design)
- Choriki Robo Galatt (1984) (character design)
- Fist of the North Star (1984)
- Dancougar – Super Beast Machine God (1985) (guest character design)
- Guyver: Out of Control (1986) (screenplay, character design, producer, key animation)
- Delpower X Bakuhatsu Miracle Genki! (1986) (character design)
- Crystal Triangle (1987) (character design)
- Bats and Terry (1987) (animation director)
- Kiko Senki Dragonar (1987) (guest character design)
- Mashin Eiyuden Wataru (1988–1998) (series character design)
- Madō King Granzort (1989–1992) (series main character design and animation director)
- Time Trouble Tondekeman! (1989) (character design)
- Cho Bakumatsu Shonen Seiki Takamaru (1991–1993) (series director and character design)
- Legendary Brave Da Garn (1992) (original character design)
- Kuso Kagaku Sekai Gulliver Boy (1995) (series director and character design)
- Amon - Apocalypse of Devilman (2000) (supervision)
- InuYasha (2000) (key animation)
- Cyborg 009: The Cyborg Soldier (2001) (animation supervision)
- F-Zero Falcon Densetsu (2003) (character design and key animation)
- Grenadier (2004) (key animation)
- Pokémon: Lucario and the Mystery of Mew (2005) (key animation)
- Oh! Edo Rocket (2007) (storyboard)

== Notable works as director ==
- The Mysterious Cities of Gold (1982–1983) (episode director)
- Fist of the North Star (1984–1988, TV series)
- Dr. Slump and Arale-chan: Hoyoyo! City of Dreams, Mechapolis (1985)
- Vampire Hunter D (1985) (also art director)
- Fist of the North Star (1986, movie)
- Kosuke and Rikimaru: Dragon of Konpei Island (1988) (also co-writer with Akira Toriyama)
- Ultimate Teacher (1988)
- Gdleen (1990)
- Pink Mizu Dorobou Ame Dorobou (1990) (also character designer with Akira Toriyama)
- The World of Narue (2003)
- Onegai My Melody (2005) (episode director and storyboard on episode 3)
- Sōten Kōro (2009)

== Notable works as a producer and production manager ==
- Roots Search (1986) (production manager)
- Guyver: Out of Control (1986)
- Amon - Apocalypse of Devilman (2000)
- The Cosmopolitan Prayers (2004)
  - Hit o Nerae!
  - Love Love?
- Grenadier (2004)
- Black Blood Brothers (2006) (production collaboration)
- Batman: Gotham Knight (2008) (production coordination on the segment "In Darkness Dwells")
