= Kazuya Kuroda =

Japanese animator, character designer and illustrator

Kazuya Kuroda (黒田 和也, Kuroda Kazuya) is a Japanese animator, character designer and illustrator. He made with his debut with the Gainax series, Top o Nerae! and Fushigi no Umi no Nadia, to which he contributed the in-between and key animation respectively. He was then the character designer and the chief animation director of Gonzo's Vandread, where his style of art and animation, especially of the female characters, brought him a great number of fans and renown.

== Works ==
=== Anime television ===
- Fushigi no Umi no Nadia (in-between and key animation)
- Bishōjo Senshi Sailor Moon S (animation director)
- Musekinin Kanchō Tylor (key animation)
- Neon Genesis Evangelion (key animation)
- VS Knight Lamune & 40 Fire (animation character design and animation director)
- Master of Mosquiton 99 (character design)
- Gate Keepers (animation director)
- Vandread (character design and chief animation director)
- Vandread: The Second Stage (character design and chief animation director)
- Chrono Crusade (character design and chief animation director)
- Saishū Heiki Kanojo (key animation)
- Chōjūshin Gravion (key animation)
- Raimuiro Senkitan (key animation)
- Kaibutsu Ōjo (character design and chief animation director)
- Spice and Wolf (character design and chief animation director)

=== OVA ===
- Top o Nerae! (in-between animation)
- 1982 Otaku no Video (key animation)
- 1985 Zoku Otaku no Video (key animation)
- Teito Monogatari: Chapter 1 (key animation)
- Macross Dynamite 7 (OP/ED animation)
- Moe Can Change! (character design)
- Dōkyūsei 2 (episodes 11 and 12 key animation)
- Fire Emblem: Mystery of the Emblem (key animation)
- Sakura Wars: The Gorgeous Blooming Cherry Blossoms (character design)
- Sakura Wars: The Radiant Gorgeous Blooming Cherry Blossoms (character design)
- Higurashi no Naku Koro ni Rei (character design)

=== Adult anime ===
- Aki Sora and Aki Sora: Yume no Naka: (character design and chief animation director)
- Harem Camp!: (character design and chief animation director)
- Hōkago Mania Club (package key animation and poster key animation)
- Sora no Iro, Mizu no Iro (character design and chief animation director) (Note: original character designs were done by Tony Taka)
- 15 Beautiful Girls Adrift (character design and chief animation director) (Note: All girls were covergirls from the BugBug Magazine)

=== Anime films ===
- Green Legend Ran: (key animation)
- SM Girls Saber Marionette R Saber Marionette R : (animation)
- Yū Yū Hakusho: Meikai Shitō-hen Honō no Kizuna (key animation)
- Tenchi Muyō!: TENCHI MUYO in LOVE (animation director)

=== Games ===
- Gate Keepers (animation director)
- Grandia (chief animator)
- Akiba-kei Kanojo (key telephone card illustrations; 18+)

=== Illustrations ===
- Saber Marionette R (novel illustrations)
- BugBug (cover illustrations)
- Stars over Heaven (Trading card illustration)
- Mist la Rouge (Trading card illustrations; 2nd volume)
- Toranoana: 2006 Fuyu no Dai Kansha-sai (Trading card illustrations; 2nd volume)
