= The Cosmopolitan Prayers =

Japanese anime television series

- Promotional image

超変身コス∞プレイヤー (Chō Henshin Kosu∞Pureiyaa)
- Anime television series
- Directed by: Takeo Takahashi
- Produced by: Akio Sakai; Masanobu Arakawa; Toyoo Ashida
- Written by: Naruhisa Arakawa; Katsura Murayama
- Music by: Toshihiko Sahashi
- Studio: Imagin; Studio Live
- Original run: January 12, 2004 – March 1, 2004
- Episodes: 8

The Cosmopolitan Prayers (超変身コス∞プレイヤー, Chō Henshin Kosu∞Pureiyaa) lit. 'Super Transformation Cosmopolitan Prayers' (or CosPrayers) is a Japanese anime television series directed by Takeo Takahashi. It was produced by m.o.e. and animated by Imagin and Studio Live. It is closely related to the anime series Hit o Nerae! and Love Love?.

== Plot ==
17-year-old high school student Koto Hoshino wants nothing more than to be as courageous as her favourite game character Misuzu. On a school excursion, she visits the Izumo temple, where a ceremony for Misuzu is being held, and is attracted to the temple's tower top when she finds a strange watch. When she gets to the top, she performs a strange ritual, but does not seem to realise. Suddenly, a portal of evil appears. Luckily, she is saved by a boy named Kurusu, who tries to overcome the mirror, but is sucked inside. A girl named Scarlet arrives, but he tells her to protect Koto. The next moment the holy ground shakes tremendously, and Koto is knocked out. When she regains her consciousness, everything has changed. Koto finds herself in what seems to be a parallel world, where Earth does not have a single soul except her and the Cosmopolitan Prayers, priestesses who combat evil. The daughter of the Sun Goddess Amaterasu appears, and explains that Koto was tricked into performing the sealing ritual and imprisoning her mother Amaterasu, who is being held prisoner by the forces of evil. Now, as part of the 'Cosprayers', Koto must fight the evil forces that sealed the Earth. The Cosmopolitan Prayers, a team of seven beautiful girls, pure in heart and body and skilled in spiritual seals, must use their skills to purify the dark towers. But can they overcome heartache and betrayal to become the White Goddess of Light? And can Koto overcome herself to save her new friends and the world?

Each episode in CosPrayers runs for twelve minutes and has a color in its title. The continuity of many episodes is sporadic which may be due to editing of the original material to fit into the twelve minutes.

== Characters ==
Koto Hoshino / Miko Rayer

- Voiced by: Miyu Matsuki

Koto always wanted to be a heroine, but the fact that she is easily scared prevents anything of the sort from happening. She loves cosplaying. When she finds a strange bracelet at the Izumo temple, she gets the chance to be a heroine for real. She is guilt-stricken when she learns that she has sealed away Amaterasu (even though she was tricked). At first, she cannot transform like the others, no matter how hard she tries, leading to severe punishment from Scarlett. When she sees In-chan and You-chan severely hurt, she becomes so angry she transforms and destroys a monster by herself. She is the only one who does not believe Kurusu about the towers, and regrets it when she destroys the final one. She is the second-in-command, but the field leader. At the end, she realises that all the girls must sing in order to defeat the Woman of the Night.
Her colour is red and she uses a sword to battle. Her theme is based on Japanese culture.
An actress playing Koto Hoshino is Natsumi Yagami.

Scarlett Church / Sister Rayer

- Voiced by: Sanae Kobayashi

Scarlett does not seem to be the nicest member of the team and is the team leader. When Koto asks if she is a cosplayer as well, she hits her. She is cold and distant, and trains Koto in a very harsh way, even going as far as to drive a car at her in order to get her to transform. Even when Koto does transform, she is not impressed, stating that it is incomplete. She tells Koto to call her "Mistress", but upon seeing Koto battle, decides to let her call her "Onee-Sama". She has romantic feelings for Kurusu, or Crus-sama as the group call him, but knows she cannot love him until the mission is over. Her name is a play on Charlotte Church.
Her colour is blue and she uses a three-bladed staff to battle. Her theme is based on European culture.
An actress playing Scarlett Church is Youko Katsuragi.

Iko Sue / Dian Rayer

- Voiced by: Kiyomi Asai

She is the most intelligent member of the group. She has a hand puppet.
Her colour is green and she uses either a bow and arrows or a whip made of green light to battle. She has a Native American theme.
An actress playing Iko Sue is Hayasaka Miku.

Remuria Sharia / Rabian Rayer

- Voiced by: Mayumi Yoshida

Her nickname is Remi. She is afraid of growing up, and wants to remain a child forever.
Her colour is purple and she uses a laser bazooka to battle. She has an Arabic theme.
An actress playing Remuria Sharia is Sayaka Imamura.

Priscillaria Shamaran / Sari Rayer

- Voiced by: Sayaka Ohara

She appears to be rather calm, as when she is attacked by a monster she puts up a shield and finishes breakfast before fighting, even remarking about its "rudeness". She has a pet dog named Inosuke. She loves curry.
Her colour is yellow and she uses a veil as either a weapon or a shield to battle. She is of Indian heritage.
An actress playing Priscillaria Shamaran is Hikaru Jougazaki.

In-chan and You-chan

- Voiced by: Tomoko Kaneda

Twin sisters and the youngest members of the team. They are not fully fledged Cosprayers yet.
Their colours are purple and orange and they use ofuda to battle, although they only battle once. They sport Chinese design.

Priest Kurusu

- Voiced by: Takahiro Sakurai

He is the head of the CosPrayers. In the first episode, he is pulled into a portal of evil after saving Koto. He reappears in the fifth episode, having been turned into the evil Black Knight. He is not happy when he learns that the girls have been destroying the Black Towers, and claims not only that Amaterasu does not exist, but by destroying the Black Towers, which he created, they are breaking the seal imprisoning the evil Woman of the Night. In the seventh episode, he and Himiko sacrifice themselves.

Takitsu-hime

- Voiced by: Kaori Shimizu

She appears in the first episode claiming to be the daughter of Amaterasu the Sun Goddess. She claims that her mother has been imprisoned, and the girls can only free her by destroying the Black Towers. This is a lie. When the last tower is destroyed, she reveals that she is the Woman of the Night. Her true form is a black swirling vortex. She is destroyed when all the girls sing as one.

The Dark Mikos

A group of four guys who possess dark magic, and the ability to turn into a huge monster. They appear to want the girls.

The White Goddess

A powerful mecha summoned when the girls remove the Limiter on their bracelets when they transform. They are connected to her by cables.

Himiko

The Miko Reiya before Koto. She tried to seal Takitsu, but failed. She is the one who led Koto to the top of the temple. She and Kurusu sacrifice themselves in order to defeat the Woman of the Night.

== Hit o Nerae! ==
Hit o Nerae!, or Smash Hit! in English, has the lead character Mizuki Ikuta as a producer of Houchiku Corporation's anime CosPrayers. Mizuki is a drama otaku and is often teased for this and for her size, being called Oko-chama which means little girl. She longed to produce a detective series and did not want to work on CosPrayers. Her only producing experience is with R-rated films and she has difficulty with her staff as the storyboard and the script do not match. Mizuki consults the writer of CosPrayers, Naoto Ooizumi, who is the main character of another sequel, Love Love?.

== Love Love? ==
Naoto is the protagonist of the third installment of the trilogy, Love Love?. The first male main character of the series, he is a quiet high school student that suddenly finds himself involved with five girls in typical harem anime fashion. This anime also has many scenes of nudity and sexual references.
