= The Island of Giant Insects =

Japanese manga series

- First tankōbon volume cover

巨蟲列島 (Kyochū Rettō)
- Genre: Horror, survival
- Manga
- Written by: Yasutaka Fujimi
- Illustrated by: Redice (2014–18); Shu Hirose (2018–19)
- Published by: Akita Shoten
- Magazine: Champion Cross; (October 21, 2014 – May 1, 2018); Manga Cross; (December 27, 2018 – March 14, 2019)
- Original run: October 21, 2014 – March 14, 2019
- Volumes: 6
- Manga

Die! The Island of Giant Insects
- Written by: Yasutaka Fujimi
- Illustrated by: Shu Hirose
- Published by: Akita Shoten
- Magazine: Manga Cross
- Original run: April 25, 2019 – March 27, 2025
- Volumes: 14
- Original animation DVD
- Directed by: Takeo Takahashi (Note: Credited as Chief Director (総監督, Sō Kantoku).); Naoyuki Tatsuwa
- Produced by: Tatsuya Ishiguro; Yūki Yamaoka; Jun Itō; Fumihiro Ozawa; Yukari Kuwayama
- Written by: Shigeru Morita
- Music by: Akinari Suzuki; Nilsson Johannes
- Studio: Passione
- Licensed by: Crunchyroll
- Released: June 20, 2019
- Runtime: 22 minutes
- Manga

Mountain of Giant Insects
- Written by: Yasutaka Fujimi
- Illustrated by: Yusuke Sazanami
- Published by: Akita Shoten
- Magazine: Dokodemo Young Champion
- Original run: November 5, 2019 – August 27, 2024
- Volumes: 8
- Anime film
- Directed by: Takeo Takahashi; Naoyuki Tatsuwa
- Produced by: Tatsuya Ishiguro; Yūki Yamaoka; Jun Itō; Fumihiro Ozawa; Yukari Kuwayama
- Written by: Shigeru Morita
- Music by: Akinari Suzuki; Nilsson Johannes
- Studio: Passione
- Licensed by: Crunchyroll; SA/SEA: Medialink
- Released: January 10, 2020
- Runtime: 76 minutes
- icon

The Island of Giant Insects (Japanese: 巨蟲列島, Hepburn: Kyochū Rettō) is a Japanese manga series written by Yasutaka Fujimi and illustrated by Redice and later by Shu Hirose. It was published online on Akita Shoten's Champion Cross web platform from October 2014 to May 2018, and on Manga Cross from December 2018 to March 2019. A sequel, titled Die! The Island of Giant Insects, was published on Manga Cross from April 2019 to March 2025. A spin-off, Mountain of Giant Insects, illustrated by Yusuke Sazanami, was published in Dokodemo Young Champion from November 2019 to August 2024.

An original animation DVD (OAD) adaptation produced by Passione was released in June 2019 and a film adaptation premiered in January 2020.

== Plot ==
A group of high school students are stranded on an uncharted island, after their plane crashes during a trip. While searching for a way to escape, they realize that the island is home to mutated insects that are significantly larger than their normal counterparts. The students band together to survive, using their wits and survival skills. The students are also faced with a group of enemy survivors who were on the plane, who are willing to do whatever it takes to ensure their own survival, including betraying their former classmates.

Faced with the opposition of giant insects and their former classmates turning on them, the students overcome their fears and insecurities, shedding their former high school cliques to work as a team and escape the island. Near the end of their journey, the students face a massive queen insect with vast strength and intellect that threatens their survival. The students confront the massive insect leveraging their experience on the island to win.

After the resolution, the remaining students escape the island, returning to their lives with newfound strength and determination, carrying with them the lessons they learned on the island.

== Characters ==
Mutsumi Oribe (織部 睦美, Oribe Mutsumi)
Voiced by: M.A.O. (Japanese); Sarah Roach (English)
Chitose Naruse (成瀬 千歳, Naruse Chitose)
Voiced by: Rika Tachibana (Japanese); Lizzie Ray (English)
Ayumi Matsuoka (松岡 歩美, Matsuoka Ayumi)
Voiced by: Misato Fukuen (Japanese); Brittney Karbowski (English)
Mami Miura (三浦 真美, Miura Mami)
Voiced by: Momo Asakura (Japanese); Kayli Mills (English)
Ai Inō (伊能 愛, Inō Ai)
Voiced by: Yurika Kubo (Japanese); Sarah Wiedenheft (English)
Misuzu Jinno (神野 美鈴, Jinno Mirei)
Voiced by: Chiaki Takahashi (Japanese); Amber Lee Connors (English)
Kazuhiko Kai (甲斐 和彦, Kai Kazuhiko)
Voiced by: Takuya Eguchi (Japanese); Alejandro Saab (English)
Atsushi Kamijō (上條 アツシ, Kamijō Atsushi)
Voiced by: Wataru Komada (Japanese); Nick Landis (English)
Inaho Enoki (榎 稲穂, Enoki Inaho)
Voiced by: Marina Inoue (Japanese); Elsie Lovelock (English)
Satoshi Oda (小田 哲, Oda Satoshi)
Voiced by: Ryōta Suzuki (Japanese); Yong Yea (English)
Hiroshi Tsuge (柘植 寛, Tsuge Hiroshi)
Voiced by: Taku Yashiro (Japanese); Brendan Blaber (English)

== Media ==
=== Manga ===
The Island of Giant Insects is written by Yasutaka Fujimi, and first illustrated by the duo Redice and later by Shu Hirose. It was serialized on Akita Shoten's Champion Cross web platform from October 21, 2014, to May 1, 2018. It was published on Manga Cross from December 27, 2018, to March 14, 2019, with an extra chapter published on March 28 of the same year. Akita Shoten collected its chapters in six tankōbon volumes, released from March 6, 2015, to June 20, 2019.

A sequel, titled Die! The Island of Giant Insects (大巨蟲列島, Dai Kyochū Rettō), was published on Manga Cross from April 25, 2019, to March 27, 2025. Akita Shoten collected in chapters in eight tankōbon volumes, released from July 20, 2020, to January 20, 2025. Akita Shoten released the first tankōbon volume on December 20, 2019. As of December 19, 2024, 14 volumes have been released.

A spin-off, Mountain of Giant Insects (巨蟲山脈, Kyochū Sanmyaku), illustrated by Yusuke Sazanami, was published on Akita Shoten's Dokodemo Young Champion web magazine from November 5, 2019, to August 27, 2024. Akita Shoten collected in chapters in eight tankōbon volumes, released from July 20, 2020, to January 20, 2025.

=== Anime ===
An original animation DVD (OAD) adaptation produced by Passione was bundled with the manga's sixth volume, released on June 20, 2019. It was directed by Takeo Takahashi and Naoyuki Tatsuwa, written by Shigeru Morita, and features character designs by Takayuki Noguchi. The OAD was announced by the producer Tatsuya Ishiguro as a "prologue to the full anime project", and that there were "still many big developments in store." The OAD aired in Japan on AT-X on December 1, 2019. An anime film adaptation by the same staff from the OAD premiered on January 10, 2020. A live-action film promotional video was launched for the film. It was co-produced by Crunchyroll. A Kickstarter campaign was launched for an English dub of the film. It was released on DVD and delivered to backers starting in February 2021. Medialink licensed the film in South and Southeast Asia, streaming it on its Ani-One Asia YouTube channel.
