= Sora no Iro, Mizu no Iro =

2004 video game

- Cover art from the Sora no Iro, Mizu no Iro visual novel

空の色、水の色 (Color of the Sky, Color of the Water)
- Genre: Romance, Hentai
- Video game
- Developer: Ciel
- Genre: Romance, Eroge, Visual novel
- Platform: Windows; 98/98SE/Me/2000/XP
- Released: June 25, 2004
- Original video animation
- Directed by: Banzou Tokita
- Produced by: Momoi Sakura
- Written by: Kaoru Takahashi
- Studio: Himajin
- Released: July 28, 2006 – June 27, 2008
- Episodes: 2

Sora no Iro, Mizu no Iro (空の色、水の色, lit. Color of the Sky, Color of the Water), also known just as SoraMizu (そらみず), is a Japanese eroge visual novel game, originally released by Ciel on 25 June 2004, which was adapted into an adult anime, released as an OVA and produced by Himajin, its first episode being published on 28 July 2006, and second episode on 27 June 2008.

== Story ==
The story revolves around two high school girls. Asa Mizushima (水島朝, Mizushima Asa) is a transfer student who soon joins the swim club to get her mind off her parents' divorce. She is confronted by Hajime Saisho (最所弌, Saisho Hajime), a cocky high school student. He persuades Asa through photography to capture her beauty, which she takes a liking to, but not at first. Asa is soon taken in by Hajime and intercourse ensues. Natsume Sorayama (空山菜摘芽, Sorayama Natsume), the second girl, who appears younger than the other two characters, takes interest in gardening. She overhears Asa and the teasing Hajime in conversation while she is hidden in a sunflower garden (conveniently located beside the club pool). While they engage in sexual activity once again, Natsume takes part by her own free will.

As the two girls discuss their relationship with Hajime at a hot springs, Natsume claims that her love interest in Hajime has lasted for some time, before Asa's arrival. They settle this somewhat small rivalry gently by agreeing to "share" him before the Summer's end. During all this, Asa experiences discomfort and shame in her guilty pleasures, while at the same time giving into them. The first episode jumps from current scenes to flashbacks leading up to their agreement, while the second dwells on the girls' sexual relationship, which is all but affectionate, up until the Summer's end. At the end of the episode, several years pass since then and the girls end up meeting at the same train station to see Hajime once again.

The story of the original visual novel includes one more character which is omitted in the OVA: Jūzō Unno (海野 十三, Unno Jūzō), who is a friend of Hajime and who also attends the swim club. Like Hajime, he develops feelings for one of the girls and this is explored in the various game paths.

== Characters ==
Hajime Saisho (最所 弌, Saisho Hajime) Voiced by: Kenichi Suzumura
The main male character. A member of the swimming team.

Jūzō Unno (海野 十三, Unno Jūzō)
A friend of Hajime. A member of the swimming team.

Asa Mizushima (水島 朝, Mizushima Asa) Voiced by: Miya Serizono (OVA 1), Saki Nakajima (OVA 2)
A female transfer student. A member of the swimming team.

Natsume Sorayama (空山 菜摘芽, Sorayama Natsume) Voiced by: Oma Ichimura (OVA 1), Asai Kiyomi (OVA 2)
A twintail-girl. She enjoys gardening.

Motoichirō Inbe (伊部 本一郎, Inbe Motoichirō)
The old homeroom teacher in the visual novel.

== Game ==
=== Staff ===
- Script: Usoya Sasaki Kibito
- Character designs and illustrations: Tony Taka
- Backgrounds: Unspeakable
- Music: Hiroki Kikuta

Theme song: Sora no Iro, Mizu no Iro (空の色、水の色)

(Lyrics: rie kito, composition: Hiroki Kikuta, sung by: rie kito)

== OVA ==
The OVA adaptation of Sora no Iro, Mizu no Iro was released across DVD on 2 episodes, each spanning about 30 minutes. Produced by Himajin, the character designer was Kazuya Kuroda, and they were supervised by Takeo Takahashi.

=== Episodes ===
- First volume: Dame …… Kikoe Chau (ダメ……聞こえちゃう)(released on: July 28, 2006)
- Second volume: Watashi mo …… shite ageru (わたしも……してあげる) (released on June 27, 2008)

=== Staff ===
- Director: Bonzou Tokita
- Planning: Kokan Mori
- Producer: Sakura Momoi
- Script: Kaoru Takahashi
- Supervision: Takeo Takahashi
- Storyboards: Takeo Takahashi (OVA 1), Bonzou Tokita (OVA 2)
- Original character designs: Tony Taka
- Character designs: Kazuya Kuroda
- Animation direction: Kazuya Kuroda (OVA 1), Keiji Ishihara (OVA 2)
- Color design: Hino Satomi
- Music: Hiroki Kikuta

Theme song: Mienai Katachi (みえないかたち)

(Lyrics: rie kito, composition: Hiroki Kikuta, sung by: rie kito)

- Animation, production & publisher: Himajin
