= So, I Can't Play H! =

Japanese light novel series and its adaptations

- Cover from the first volume of the light novel

だから僕は、Hができない。 (Dakara Boku wa, H ga Dekinai.)
- Genre: Erotic comedy, fantasy
- Light novel
- Written by: Pan Tachibana
- Illustrated by: Yoshiaki Katsurai
- Published by: Fujimi Shobo
- Imprint: Fujimi Fantasia Bunko
- Magazine: Dragon Magazine
- Original run: June 19, 2010 – August 20, 2013
- Volumes: 11
- Manga
- Written by: Pan Tachibana (original story)
- Illustrated by: Yoshiaki Katsurai (original design); Shou Okagiri
- Published by: Fujimi Shobo
- English publisher: NA: Yen Press
- Imprint: Dragon Comics Age
- Magazine: Monthly Dragon Age
- Original run: October 7, 2011 – December 6, 2013
- Volumes: 5
- Anime television series
- Directed by: Takeo Takahashi
- Written by: Naruhisa Arakawa
- Music by: Cher Watanabe
- Studio: Feel
- Licensed by: AUS: Madman Entertainment; NA: Sentai Filmworks; UK: MVM Entertainment
- Original network: AT-X (uncensored); Tokyo MX, Sun Television, TV Kanagawa, BS11 (censored), Anime Network
- Original run: July 6, 2012 – September 25, 2012
- Episodes: 12
- Original video animation
- Directed by: Yoshifumi Sueda
- Written by: Naruhisa Arakawa
- Music by: Cher Watanabe
- Studio: Feel
- Released: March 27, 2013
- Runtime: 24 minutes
- icon

So, I Can't Play H! (Japanese: だから僕は、H(エッチ)ができない。, Hepburn: Dakara Boku wa, Ecchi ga Dekinai.), shortened to Boku-H (僕H(エッチ), Boku-Ecchi), is a Japanese light novel series written by Pan Tachibana and illustrated by Yoshiaki Katsurai. The story centers on Ryosuke Kaga, a lecherous high school student who makes a contract with Lisara Restall, a beautiful Grim Reaper, in exchange for his lecherous spirit.

Dakara Boku wa, H ga Dekinai began serialization in Fujimi Shobo's Dragon Magazine in 2010. The series' eleven volumes were released between June 19, 2010, and August 20, 2013. A manga adaptation illustrated by Shou Okagiri began serialization in the May 2011 issue of Monthly Dragon Age, and released five volumes as of December 9, 2013. A 12-episode anime adaptation produced by Feel was announced, and aired from July to September 2012 on AT-X and other networks. The anime series was licensed by Sentai Filmworks in 2013 for distribution in North America. Sentai Filmworks has released the series on DVD, Blu-ray Disc and for online streaming.

== Plot ==
One day, Ryosuke Kaga, a high school boy attending Momozomo Academy (桃園学園, Momozomo Gakuen), meets a girl standing alone in the rain. Introducing herself as Lisara Restall, an elite Grim Reaper, she visited the human world in order to find "The Singular Man". Ryosuke makes a deal with Lisara, to allow her to suck the energy from him that she needs for her activity in the human world. The source of the energy is his lechery. To preserve his life, Ryosuke helps in Lisara's search.

== Characters ==
=== Main characters ===
Ryosuke Kaga (加賀 良介, Kaga Ryōsuke)
Voiced by: Hiro Shimono
Ryosuke is a second-year student at Momozomo Academy, who uses his lecherous life-energy to give Lisara energy. Also, he learns from Lisara that he will die in three months and in return for his help now, she will try to change his fate. Lisara uses the Broken Sword, Gram, which used to belong to the god of war, to form a contract with Ryosuke. However, it was revealed later that Ryosuke has the other half of Gram (which was thought to be lost), thus gaining full power of the sword. He falls in love with Lisara, and can only fully charge his lecherous spirit energy if he thinks of her body alone or with his "Invisible Dictionary". He lives on his own (until Lisara moved in) because his mother works overseas; his father died when he was 3 (his mother later reveals that his father isn't actually dead but that he disappeared). At the end of the anime, he and Lisara became a couple even though Lisara still feels uneasy about his lecherousness.

Lisara Restall (リサラ・レストール, Risara Resutōru)
Voiced by: Aya Endō
The heroine of the story, a beautiful Grim Reaper who makes a deal with Ryosuke and uses his lecherous "spirit" for energy. She wields a scythe called "Carnun Pladur" (カルヌーンプラデュール, Karunūn Puradyūru), which channels the element of fire. She used the hilt of the Broken Sword Gram (belonging to the Restall family) to form a contract with Ryosuke. She falls in love with Ryosuke but does not show it, unlike the other girls. Her bust size is seventy-something cm. At the end of the anime, she and Ryosuke became a couple.

Mina Okura (大倉 美菜, Ōkura Mina)
Voiced by: Kaori Ishihara
Ryosuke's childhood best friend and currently Quele's partner. She developed a large bust early in her childhood and is now a 92 cm - G-cup. She has very strong feelings for Ryosuke as he protected her when they were children. She is aware of Ryosuke's lecherousness and it doesn't seem to bother her. Mina is untroubled when Lisara's true identity is revealed and lets Lisara continue her "business" with Ryosuke. She makes a contract with Quele so that she can help Ryosuke and her energy charge for Quele develops when she talks about him.

Quele Zeria (キュール・ゼリア, Kyūru Zeria)
Voiced by: Arisa Nishiguchi
Lisara's distant cousin and another Grim Reaper. She calls Lisara "Onee-sama" despite not being her sister. She makes a contract with Mina as her energy source, to both Ryosuke's and Lisara's dismay. In battle she wields a gladius called "Carnun Solace" (カルヌーンソラス, Karunūn Sorasu), which channels the element of ice. She falls in love with Ryosuke but later in the series, she pushes those feelings aside to support first Mina, then Lisara.

Iria Fukumune (福宗 イリア, Fukumune Iria)
Voiced by: Misato Fukuen
Lisara's rival Grim Reaper during her school years at Grimwald, who is also a famous pop idol in the human world. Despite being 2nd in the school (Lisara being ranked top of her class), she has the biggest bust size of the main cast (92.5 cm - G-cup). However, her large breasts are revealed to be a result of infusing breast pads with magic, and her actual bust size is smaller than Lisara's. She wields a falchion named "Flotty" (フロッティ, Furotti), which channels the element of lightning. She also claims to be in love with Ryosuke, but so far it only seems she likes him because of the energy he can create. She is also trying to find a Singular Person for herself (to level in rank) and for her employers. Instead of gaining energy from a contract with a person, she gains energy from the devotion of her fans.

=== Momozomo Academy students and staff ===
Ohira (大平, Ōhira)
Voiced by: Yuya Nakamura
Ryosuke's classmate.

Hikaru Tamano (玉野 光, Tamano Hikaru)
Voiced by: Yukari Shimotsuki
The son of the headmaster. A narcissist.

Muneo Meshiyori (飯頼 宗緒, Meshiyori Muneo)
Voiced by: Azusa Tadokoro
Ryosuke's classmate who has heterochromic eyes (Her left eye is blue and her right eye is red). She has the ability to determine any girl's breast size accurately from just a glance.

Ms. Ranbashi (乱橋先生, Ranbashi-sensei)
Voiced by: Kana Maruzuka
A bespectacled teacher at Momozomo Academy.

Shinichi Hattori (服部 新一, Hattori Shin'ichi)
Voiced by: Shōki Tomita

=== Restall Family ===
Almeia Restall (アルメイア・レストール, Arumeia Resutōru)
Voiced by: Aya Hisakawa
Head of the Restall family and mother of Lisara.

Hild (ヒルド, Hirudo) Voiced by: Shiena Udagawa
Urus (ウルス, Urusu) Voiced by: Aya Uchida
Maids of the Restall family.

=== Merilot Life Insurance ===
Galdarblog (ガルダーブロウグ, Garudāburōgu) / Ryosuke Kaga (加賀 りょうすけ, Kaga Ryōsuke)?
Voiced by: Shinobu Matsumoto
Main antagonist of the story. He seeks to destroy the border between Grimwald and Humans' world to directly control the population over there as he believes with lengthened lifespan, caused by other grim reapers, humans are just going to destroy themselves even more. He wields the Demon Sword Tyrfing (魔剣ティルフィング, Maken Tirufingu).

Merilot Executive (メルロの幹部, Meruro no Kanbu)
Voiced by: Yūki Itagaki

Manager (マネージャー, Manējā)
Voiced by: Asuka Takahashi

Dalnia Earheart (ダルニア・イアハート, Darunia Iahāto)
Voiced by: Minori Chihara

=== Other characters ===
Satomi Kaga (加賀 さとみ, Kaga Satomi)
Voiced by: Yūko Gibu
Ryosuke's mother. Her personality is somewhat like her son's, but at a lower extent. When her husband Ryosuke disappeared, she took care of her son on her own. She is unaware that her husband is from Grimwald and a member of the Galdarblog family.

Caesar (カエサル, Kaesaru)
Ryosuke's pet dog, a German Shepherd. He served briefly as Iria's temporary provisional contractor, to her own embrassment.

== Media ==
=== Light novels ===
Dakara Boku wa, H ga Dekinai began as a light novel series written by Pan Tachibana with illustrations by Yoshiaki Katsurai. The first light novel volume was released by Fujimi Shobo on June 19, 2010, under their Fujimi Fantasia Bunko imprint. The series finished with the eleventh volume, published on August 20, 2013.

| No. | Title | Release date | ISBN |
|---|---|---|---|
| 1 | Dakara Boku wa, H ga Dekinai: Grim Reapers and Life Insurance; Dakara Boku wa, Ecchi ga Dekinai: Shinigami to Jinsei Honshō (だから僕は、Hができない。 死神と人生保障) | June 19, 2010 | 978-4-8291-3534-1 |
| 2 | Dakara Boku wa, H ga Dekinai 2: Grim Reapers and Selection Tests; Dakara Boku wa, Ecchi ga Dekinai 2: Shinigami to Senbatsu Shiken (だから僕は、Hができない。2 死神と選抜試験) | October 20, 2010 | 978-4-8291-3567-9 |
| 3 | Dakara Boku wa, H ga Dekinai 3: Grim Reapers and World Revolution; Dakara Boku wa, Ecchi ga Dekinai 3: Shinigami to Sekai Kakumei (だから僕は、Hができない。3 死神と世界革命) | February 19, 2011 | 978-4-8291-3607-2 |
| 4 | Dakara Boku wa, H ga Dekinai 4: Grim Reapers and my First Experience; Dakara Boku wa, Ecchi ga Dekinai 4: Shinigami to Hatsutaiken (だから僕は、Hができない。4 死神と初体験) | May 20, 2011 | 978-4-8291-3643-0 |
| 5 | Dakara Boku wa, H ga Dekinai 5: Grim Reapers and the Lost Royal Family; Dakara Boku wa, Ecchi ga Dekinai 5: Shinigami to Ushinawareta Ōke (だから僕は、Hができない。5 死神と失われた王家) | September 17, 2011 | 978-4-8291-3684-3 |
| 6 | Dakara Boku wa, H ga Dekinai 6: Grim Reapers and Sea Bathing; Dakara Boku wa, Ecchi ga Dekinai 6: Shinigami to Kaisuiyoku (だから僕は、Hができない。6 死神と海水浴) | February 18, 2012 | 978-4-8291-3734-5 |
| 7 | Dakara Boku wa, H ga Dekinai 7: Grim Reapers and Panties; Dakara Boku wa, Ecchi ga Dekinai 7: Shinigami to Pantsu (だから僕は、Hができない。7 死神とパンツ) | April 20, 2012 | 978-4-8291-3755-0 |
| 8 | Dakara Boku wa, H ga Dekinai 8: Grim Reapers and Mina; Dakara Boku wa, Ecchi ga Dekinai 8: Shinigami to Mina (だから僕は、Hができない。8 死神と美菜) | July 20, 2012 | 978-4-8291-3784-0 |
| 9 | Dakara Boku wa, H ga Dekinai 9: Grim Reapers and Memories; Dakara Boku wa, Ecchi ga Dekinai 9: Shinigami to Omoide (だから僕は、Hができない。9 死神と思い出) | September 20, 2012 | 978-4-8291-3807-6 |
| 10 | Dakara Boku wa, H ga Dekinai 10: Grim Reapers and Confessions; Dakara Boku wa, Ecchi ga Dekinai 10: Shinigami to Kokuhaku (だから僕は、Hができない。10 死神と告白) | April 20, 2013 | 978-4-8291-3883-0 |
| 11 | Dakara Boku wa, Ecchi ga Dekinai 11: Shinigami to Ōsama (だから僕は、Hができない。11 死神と王様) | August 20, 2013 | 978-4-8291-3925-7 |

=== Manga ===
A manga adaptation illustrated by Shou Okagiri began serialization in the March 2011 issue of Monthly Dragon Age, published on February 9, 2011. The first bound volume was released October 8, 2011, with a total of five volumes available as of December 9, 2013. A limited edition of the fourth volume was released on March 27, 2013, and was bundled with a Blu-ray containing an anime episode. Yen Press licensed the manga for release in North America, with the first volume to release on April 21, 2015.

| No. | Original release date | Original ISBN | English release date | English ISBN |
|---|---|---|---|---|
| 1 | October 8, 2011 | 978-4-04-712751-7 | April 21, 2015 | 978-0-316-38376-9 |
| 2 | April 9, 2012 | 978-4-04-712789-0 | July 21, 2015 | 978-0-316-26245-3 |
| 3 | September 8, 2012 | 978-4-04-712825-5 | October 27, 2015 | 978-0-316-26375-7 |
| 4 | March 27, 2013 (limited edition); April 9, 2013 (regular edition) | 978-4-04-712823-1 (limited edition); ISBN 978-4-04-712866-8 (regular edition) | January 19, 2016 | 978-0-316-26376-4 |
| 5 | December 9, 2013 | 978-4-04-712962-7 | April 19, 2016 | 978-0-316-26377-1 |

=== Anime ===
An anime adaptation, first announced on December 28, 2011, aired on AT-X and other networks from July 6, 2012, to September 25, 2012. The anime is produced by Feel under the directorship of Takeo Takahashi, with series composition by Naruhisa Arakawa, music by Cher Watanabe, and characters by Kanetoshi Kamimoto. The anime is licensed in North America by Sentai Filmworks under the title So, I Can't Play H?, with simulcasts provided by Crunchyroll during the anime's airing and Section23 Films releasing the series in 2013. The series was released in Japan as six DVD and Blu-ray volumes between September 26, 2012, and February 20, 2013, and in North America on DVD and Blu-ray sets on December 31, 2013. An OVA episode was released on Blu-ray, bundled with the fourth manga volume on March 27, 2013. Episodes 8 and later were delayed by one week due to production issues.

The opening theme for the series is "Reason why XXX" by Sayaka Sasaki, while the ending theme is "Platinum 17" (プラチナ17, Purachina Sebuntīn) by Yozuca. The songs were released as CD singles on July 25, 2012, and August 8, 2012, under the Lantis label.

==== Episode list ====
| No. | Title | Original release date |
|---|---|---|
| 1 | "A Red String of Fate!?" "Unmei no Akai Ito!?" (運命の赤い糸!?) | July 6, 2012 |
On his way home from school, Ryosuke meets Lisara and invites her to his home. After some erotic events, Ryosuke learns about Lisara's true purpose and discovers something about himself. Afterwards a strange creature attacks and things get even more interesting and Lisara tells him that he will die in three months.
| 2 | "Being a Perv is Good for the Environment" "Ero wa Kankyō ni Yasashii" (エロは環境にやさしい) | July 13, 2012 |
Ryosuke and Lisara meet Quele, Lisara's cousin, who isn't as innocent as she appears.
| 3 | "The Dangerous Idol" "Kiken na Aidoru" (危険なアイドル) | July 20, 2012 |
Ryosuke and Lisara meet Iria, a life insurance company's idol, who shares a past with Lisara.
| 4 | "The Gap Between Large and Small Breasts" "Kyōi no Kakusa Shakai" (胸囲の格差社会) | July 27, 2012 |
Iria interested in Ryosuke's ability to charge up repeatedly enrolls into his class. And some clues are revealed about the origins of the creatures that keep attacking Lisara.
| 5 | "Invisible Dictionary" | August 3, 2012 |
Determined not to hinder Lisara in battle, Ryosuke starts intense training exercises. But forgets to tell a neglected Lisara what he's doing.
| 6 | "Together as One" "Hitotsu ni Nacchatta" (ひとつになっちゃった) | August 10, 2012 |
Ryosuke and the rest learn from Ryosuke's mother the truth about what really happened to his father.
| 7 | "I Want to Let You" "Ikasete Agetai" (いかせてあげたい) | August 17, 2012 |
Ryosuke, Lisara, Kyūru, and Iria go to Grimworld to rescue Mina who has been kidnapped by Galdarblog.
| 7.5 | "I Was Suddenly Put" "Ikinari Irechatta" (いきなり入れちゃった) | August 24, 2012 |
A recap episode of all the events that happened thus far. (Special)
| 8 | "Rival, Sways" "Raibaru, Yureru" (好敵胸、揺れる) | August 28, 2012 |
A war breaks out in the Grimworld to retake the tower from Galdarblog. Lisara and Iria attempt to rescue Mina while Ryosuke recovers.
| 9 | "My Kingdom Standing Tall" "Furuitatsu Kingudamu" (奮い勃つ剣) | September 4, 2012 |
Ryosuke and Galdarblog duel which causes the wall between both worlds to break. Ryosuke comes out the victor.
| 10 | "Heaven After Hell" "Tengoku nochi Jigoku" (てんごくのちじごく) | September 11, 2012 |
Aftershocks of the battle have created chaos. The girls try to prevent Ryosuke from finding out until things settle down, but a new Grim Reaper appears, and her appearance is not good news.
| 11 | "Make Love Happen" "Koi o Kanaete" (恋をかなえて) | September 18, 2012 |
With the identity of the school's special person found, all that's left is to have that person burst out with enough energy to save Ryosuke. But there's an obstacle to overcome first.
| 12 | "Shut Up About H" "Dakara Ecchi ga Dō toka Iu na" (だからHがどうとか言うな) | September 25, 2012 |
While Iria tries to buy time, Lisara tries one last long shot to save Ryosuke. However, there will be harsh consequences if she fails. Love may create an opportunity for others as well.
| OVA | "Too Much Skin! The Swimsuit Contest" "Miesugi! Mizugi Kontesuto" (見えすぎ!水着コンテスト) | March 27, 2013 |
The story takes place after the 4th episode and is not part of the original anime.

== Reception ==
The streaming series was given favorable reviews by Theron Martin of the Anime News Network. Episodes 1–6 received grades from B− for the sub to B+ for the art. Episodes 7–12 received grades from B− for the music to B for everything else. The North American Blu-ray release was reviewed by Chris Beveridge for The Fandom Post. He gave it a favorable review, with an overall grade of "B".
