= Rizelmine =

Manga and anime series by Yukiru Sugisaki

- Cover of Rizelmine as released by Tokyopop in North America on August 9, 2005

りぜるまいん (Rizerumain)
- Genre: Romantic comedy; Science fiction
- Manga
- Written by: Yukiru Sugisaki
- Published by: Kadokawa Shoten
- English publisher: NA / UK: Tokyopop
- Magazine: Monthly Ace Next
- Original run: November 2001 – April 2002
- Volumes: 1
- Anime television series
- Directed by: Yasuhiro Matsumura
- Written by: Naruhisa Arakawa; Kazuyuki Fudeyasu; Yuki Enatsu
- Music by: Toshihiko Sahashi
- Studio: Imagin; Madhouse
- Original network: Kids Station
- Original run: April 2, 2002 – December 21, 2002
- Episodes: 24

Rizelmine (りぜるまいん, Rizerumain) is a Japanese manga series written and illustrated by Yukiru Sugisaki. The manga was originally serialized for six chapters in the Kadokawa Shoten magazine Ace Next from November 2001 to April 2002 with a single tankōbon collection released on March 22, 2002. The manga was translated into English and published in the North America by Tokyopop on August 9, 2005. An anime television series adaptation animated by Imagin and Madhouse aired on Japan's Kids Station in 2002, but has not been licensed in English. Rizelmine was split into two seasons, both containing 12 episodes each. The first season aired April 2, 2002, through June 18, 2002. The second season, titled Rizelmine II, aired October 5, 2002, through December 21, 2002.

== Plot ==
The storyline of Rizelmine centers on Tomonori Iwaki, a 15-year-old student who likes older women, including high school girls, college girls, and even female instructors. Having just discovered that his teacher (upon whom he has nursed a massive crush) is engaged to be married, he comes home to find, much to his dismay, that he has been forced by "Power Of The State" to marry a 12-year-old girl named Rizel, who is the government's first creation in its experiments to genetically engineer a human. Whatever resistance Iwaki's parents might put forth is immediately dissolved by promises of free HVAC, promotion, and government paid home loans, all instituted by "Power Of The State". Despite Tomonori's protests, Rizel and her three secret service guardians known only as Papa A, Papa B, and Papa C move briskly into Tomonori's house, and the stage is set.

Rizel's tears contain the same make up as nitroglycerin and as such are explosives which creates a need for constant repair in their house. A running gag is that at the end of each episode, Tomonori calls Rizel an idiot, causing her to cry and thus cause an explosion. Rizel, with the help of her Papas, tries as hard as she can to win Tomonori's love. However, Tomonori is still in love with his teacher. Other characters creating an ever-tangled love web are Ryunosuke Hououin, who is in love with Rizel, and Kyoko Yachigusa, who is in love with Tomonori. Both try their best to prevent Rizel and Tomonori from getting close to each other. Later on Tomonori finds out that Rizel is the older woman he fell in love with when he was young but she was unable to grow after they met because she fell for him too, and she needed more than just the love from her "papas". When he learns this, Tomonori realizes that Rizel is his older woman.

== Characters ==
Rizel Iwaki (岩城 りぜる, Iwaki Rizeru)
Voiced by: Rie Kugimiya
Rizel was developed as a secret government project. She has stopped growing so she has the body of a 12 year old and has a happy-go-lucky personality. She started living with Tomonori but is subject to his constant abuse, always resulting in her nitroglycerin tears blowing up yet another part of his house. She is considered cute and friendly by many of her classmates. She chose Iwaki as her husband and needs his love to be able to continue her growth. She is often chased by Hououin Ryunosuke, for her innocence and her cute bear panties.
Tomonori Iwaki (岩城 友紀, Iwaki Tomonori)
Voiced by: Kappei Yamaguchi
Tomonori is a normal 15 year old boy in his third year of junior high-school with a thing for older women. The reason is when he was a child, he tried to save Rizel when she was about to be hit by a truck and when he woke up Rizel was hugging him. He has a long standing crush on his homeroom teacher, Natsumi Ibata. He was forcibly married to Rizel by the government. When Rizel starts appearing at school and claiming to be his wife, his friends are jealous of such a girl being ensnared by Iwaki already and start calling him a pervert. Despite his rather brash nature, he has a tendency towards chivalrous acts. This is shown when he saved Rizel from a car and Kyouko from her out of control bike.
Kyouko Yachigusa (八千草 響子, Yachigusa Kyōko)
Voiced by: Rie Tanaka
Kyouko is two years older than Iwaki and has a crush on him. She is the daughter of Papa C. Iwaki saved her when her bicycle brakes stopped working two years ago and she has liked him ever since. She is seemingly very shy and so has taken her two years to confess her love to Iwaki. In fact, she has a highly volatile, dominative personality, so much that she has to oppress it by wearing special glasses. When she finally gives up on Iwaki, she and Ryuunosuke become a couple in the end of the anime.
Ryuunosuke Hououin (鳳凰院 龍之介, Hōōin Ryūnosuke)
Voiced by: Chihiro Suzuki
Hououin is in the same year as Iwaki and fell in love with Rizel at first sight. He used her as a model to update his figure which he calls "the twelve year old". He is very wealthy and has a personal ninja who acts as his assistant whenever he executes his plans to win Rizel's heart. His other hobbies include collecting bear panties, which he calls a symbol of the purity and innocence of a twelve-year-old girl. Towards the end of the second season he and Kyouko become a couple.
The Papas
Voiced by: Hajime Iijima, Toshitaka Shimizu, and Takashi Matsuyama
The Papas are a group of three old men who are the guardians of Rizel. Their names are never revealed, but they are called Papa A, Papa B and Papa C. Papa C has a tendency to cross-dress.
The Mamas
Three women whose real names, like the Papas, are never revealed. They are called Mama A, Mama B, and Mama C. While the Papas are taking care of Rizel, the Mamas are in the lab monitoring her emotions. It is revealed in the end that mama A is the daughter of papa A.
Aoi Seimoto (聖本 あおい, Seimoto Aoi)
Voiced by: Masumi Asano
Aoi is Tomonori's childhood friend and Rizel's best friend. She is the president of the class and has a crush on Ryunosuke. She is generally mature for her age, though she often teases Tomonori about his crush on the teacher and often helps Rizel win his heart. Towards the end of the anime, Aoi gives up on liking Ryunosuke and instead develops feelings for a stray dog.
Natsumi Ibata (井端 菜摘, Ibata Natsumi)
Voiced by: Yūko Nagashima
The teacher of the class 3-B and the object of Tomonori's affections. Unfortunately for him, she became engaged. Eventually, she has some sort of fight with her fiancé, so she doesn't come to school. Tomonori goes to her house, at one point leaving her flowers. He takes her to his special spot beside the sea where he goes to think about things and he ends up comforting her and convincing her to go through with the marriage, contrary to his plans. Rizel catches the bouquet at Natsumi-sensei's wedding.

== Media ==
=== Manga ===
The Rizelmine manga was originally serialized in the Kadokawa Shoten magazine Monthly Ace Next beginning in its November 2001 issue and ending in its April 2002 issue. All six chapters were compiled into a single tankōbon collection released on March 22, 2002. The manga was translated into English and published in the North America by Tokyopop on August 9, 2005. Tokyopop advertised the manga's cover with "From the creator of D.N.Angel!".

=== Anime ===
An anime television series adaptation was produced by m.o.e and animated by Imagin and Madhouse. It was broadcast on Japan's Kids Station in two separate seasons, both containing 12 episodes with 15-minute runtimes each. The first season aired April 2, 2002, through June 18, 2002. The second season, titled Rizelmine II, aired October 5, 2002, through December 21, 2002, as part of the channel's Anime Complex Night block. Pony Canyon released a series of eight DVDs containing three episodes apiece. The two seasons were released in box sets on September 15, 2010. Streamed episodes were also made available on m.o.e.'s official website for the show. An English dub version of the anime has not been officially released. However, the anime streaming website Crunchyroll has previously hosted fansubtitled episodes of the series.

==== Episodes ====
No.	Title	Original release date
1	"Suddenly! Young Wife!?" "Totsuzen! Osanazuma!?" (突然! 幼な妻!?)	April 2, 2002
2	"Monopoly! Adult's Time!?" "Dokusen! Otona No Jikan!?" (独占! 大人の時間!?)	April 9, 2002
3	"Go for it! Two People in a Futon!?" "Mezase! Futari de Ofuton In!?" (めざせ! 2人でおふとんイン!?)	April 16, 2002
4	"Bold! Embraced and Happy?" "Daitan! Dakarete Happī!?" (大胆! 抱かれてハッピー!?)	April 23, 2002
5	"Yes We Did It! Together, We Came!?" "Yattane! Isshoni Icchatta!?" (やったね! 一緒にイッちゃった!?)	April 30, 2002
6	"SOS! Dangerous After School!?" "S.O.S! Abunai Hōkago!?" (S・O・S! あぶない放課後!?)	May 7, 2002
7	"Rival? Big Breasted High School Girl!" "Raibaru? Chichideka Joshikōsei!" (ライバル? ちちでか女子高生!)	May 14, 2002
8	"By Force!? Five Seconds Before Uniting!" "Chikara Zuku!? Gattai Go Byō Mae!" (チカラずく!? 合体五秒前!)	May 21, 2002
9	"First Experience!? I Held Him!" "Shotaiken!? Atashiga Dai Chatta!" (初体験!? あたしが抱いちゃった!)	May 28, 2002
10	"Love Letter Panic! A Dilemma Of Love!?" "Raburetā panikku! Koi No Itabasami!?" (ラブレターパニック! 恋の板挟み!?)	June 4, 2002
11	"It's Summer! It's The Beach! Aim For It, The Legendary Kiss!?" "Natsu Da! Umi Da! Mezase Densetsu No Kisu!?" (夏だ! 海だ! めざせ伝説のキス!?)	June 11, 2002
12	"The Door To Adulthood! First Time Reaching C!?" "Otona e no Tobira! Hajimete No C!?" (オトナへの扉! 初めてのC!?)	June 18, 2002
13	"Hafuun Big Transformation by Adult Goods!?" "Hafūn ♥ Adarutogudzu de Daihenshin!?" (はふーん♥ アダルトグッズで大変身!?)	October 5, 2002
14	"I'll Put My Life On The Line! Uffun First Date" "Inochi Kakemasu! Uffun Hatsu Dēto♥" (命かけます! うっふん初デート♥)	October 12, 2002
15	"Don't Die Danna-sama! Serious Power Dash!" "Shinanaide Danna Sama! Honki Pawā no Dasshu!" (死なないでダンナさま!! ほんきパワーのだっしゅ!)	October 19, 2002
16	"School Trip to the West... Suddenly a Double Date?!" "Shūgakuryokō, Nishi e... Miwaku no W Dēto!?" (修学旅行、西へ… 魅惑のWデート!?)	October 26, 2002
17	"School Trip to the West... A Double Charming Adultery?!" "Shūgakuryokō, Nishi e... Miwaku no W Furin!?" (修学旅行、西へ… 魅惑のW不倫!?)	November 2, 2002
18	"School Trip to the West... A Charming Battle Swapping?" "Shūgakuryokō, Nishi e... Miwaku no Batorusuwappingu!?" (修学旅行、西へ… 魅惑のバトルスワッピング!?)	November 9, 2002
19	"Adult's C, What Happened To The Baby Wife?" "Otona No C♥ Osanazuma ni Nani ga Okottaka!?" (オトナのC♥ 幼な妻に何が起こったか!?)	November 16, 2002
20	"Young Skins Touching!? Our First First Night!" "Fureau Yawahada!? Hafuhafuhatsu Shoya!" (ふれあう柔肌!? はふはふはつ初夜!)	November 23, 2002
21	"As Passion Takes Us!! Love Is Everything!" "Yokubou No Omomuku Mamani!! Ai koso Subete!" (欲望の赴くままに!! 愛こそすべて!)	November 30, 2002
22	"A Change In Attitude!! You Do It And It's All Over!?" "Taido Hyōhen!! Yacchattara Soremade yo!?" (態度豹変!! やっちゃったらそれまでよ!?)	December 7, 2002
23	"A Touch-And-Go Situation!! Hafun Bishōjo's Melee" "Isshokusokuhatsu!! Hafu~n Bishōjo Dairansen♥" (一触即発!! はふ～ん美少女台乱戦♥)	December 14, 2002
24	"Do It For The First Time Let's Start!" "Hajime ♥♥♥ Masho!" (はじめ♥♥♥ましょ!)	December 21, 2002

=== CD ===
The opening theme, "Hajimete Shimasho" (はじめて♡しましょ; lit. 'Let's do it for the First Time'), and the closing themes, "Honki Pawaa no Dasshu!" (ほんきパワーのだっしゅ!; lit. 'Serious Power Dash!') and "Danna Samahe" (ダンナさまへ♡; lit. 'To My Husband'), were all performed by Rie Kugimiya. A CD single featuring the opening and the first ending was released by Pony Canyon on April 17, 2002.

== Reception ==
Rizelmine was ranked number 87 on a list of comic sales estimates by Diamond Comic Distributors, selling around 1,165 copies in the United States in July 2005. The manga was nominated for "Best One-Shot" of 2005 by the readers of AnimeOnDVD.com. Critical reviews for Rizelmine have been very mixed. Eduardo M. Chavez of Mania.com gave a somewhat positive review of the manga. He opined that Sugisaki's art style and character designs in Rizelmine have evolved since her earliest work, such as The Candidate for Goddess. However, he felt she still has difficulty setting up action scenes, with panels that are "far too active" with "characters and SFX jumping in and out" despite the story already being so highly paced. The reviewer compared the relationship of the two protagonists to that of Urusei Yatsura, an older motif that he felt Sugisaki made very derivative. Chavez concluded that Rizelmine "does have enough of its own style for it to stand on its own", with half of the chapters consisting of filler, bookended by the opening with character introductions and the ending with some background information. Craig Johnson of Manga Life highly recommended Rizelmine, finding it to be largely entertaining and funny, and desiring more than just one volume.

According to Japanese television ratings information, Rizelmine was the eighth most viewed show for the month of May 2002. Like the manga version, the anime adaptation has received mixed reviews. ANN's Allen Divers appreciated Rizelmine for its animation quality and humor, confessing it to be "an easygoing fun little romp" despite its lack of advancing narrative and its similarity to Urusei Yatsura. Carlos Ross of T.H.E.M. Anime Reviews lambastes nearly every aspect of the television series aside from its animation. Ross was disturbed by the fanservice and even took offense to its slapstick approach to domestic abuse. John Oppliger, a writer for AnimeNation, found Rizelmine to be "too cute to appeal to mainstream consumers, and too cliché and sappy to attract a significant audience of hardcore American anime fans".
