= Mayumi Yoshida (Japanese voice actress) =

Japanese actress (born 1982)

- 吉田 真弓
- Born: August 26, 1982 (age 42)
- Years active: 2001-present
- Agent: I'm Enterprise
- Website: www.imenterprise.jp/profile.php?id=93

Mayumi Yoshida (吉田 真弓, Yoshida Mayumi, born August 26, 1982) is a Japanese voice actress.

== Filmography ==
Television performances
Year	Title	Role	Notes
2001	Parappa the Rapper	Baby Bird	
2002	Pokémon Advance	Kachinuki Aki Wakana	
2003	Gunparade March	Nonomi Higashihara	
2003	Fullmetal Alchemist	Elysia Hughes	
2004	The Cosmopolitan Prayers	Remuria Sharia Rabianrayer	
2004	Hit o Nerae!	Sayaka Imamura	
2004	Love Love?	Sayaka Imamura	
2004	Samurai Champloo	Child Seyama	Episode 21
2004	Uta Kata	Rui Munakata	
2005	Aquarion	Chibi-ko	
2005	Black Cat	Joanna	
2005	Immortal Grand Prix (TV 2)	Girl	Episode 9
2006-2007	Himawari!	Himeji	
2006	Sasami: Magical Girls Club	Asami Minakata	
2007	Gakuen Utopia Manabi Straight!	Student	Episode 12
2007	Princess Resurrection	Hiroko	
2010	Hanamaru Kindergarten	Toshiaki	
2011	Oretachi ni Tsubasa wa Nai	Asuka Watarai	
2011	Hoshizora e Kakaru Hashi	Hina Sakai	
2011	The Idolmaster	Kasumi Takatsuki	
2011	Mashiroiro Symphony - The color of lovers	Sana Inui	

=== Video games ===
==== Eroge ====
As Misono Moriya

- Akane iro Ni Somaru Saka, Mitsuki Shiina
- ef - the letter tale, Mizuki Hayama / Akane Himura
  - Tenshi no Nichiyoubi, Mizuki Hayama
- Hare Tokidoki Otenkiame, Nazuna Kasugai
- Hoshizora e Kakaru Hashi, Hina Sakai
  - Hoshizora e Kakaru Hashi AA, Hina Sakai
- Lovely Quest, Minaho Sakuraba
- Manatsu no Yoru no Yuki Monogatari: Midsummer Snow Night, Sakura Haruno (not as Misono Moriya)
- Mashiroiro Symphony - Love is pure white, Sana Inui
- Making * Lovers, Reina Kanome
- Nanairo Kouro, Rachel Windsor
- Navel *Plus, Asuka Watarai & Tsubakiko Munemoto
- Oretachi ni Tsubasa wa Nai, Asuka Watarai
- Owaru Sekai to Birthday, Mikaeru Nagoshi
- Renai 0 Kilometer, Hana Kinomoto
- Sekai Seifuku Kanojo, Tsubakiko Munemoto
  - World Wide Love! -Sekai Seifuku Kanojo Fandisk, Tsubakiko Munemoto
- Tokeijikake no Ley Line, Ushio Shishigatani
- Your Diary, Kanade Hirosaki

==== Other games ====
- Agarest Senki Mariage, Piadina
- Arcana Heart 2, Parace L'sia
- Arcana Heart 3, Konoha
- Criminal Girls, Makoto Hatsurai (Shin)
- Izuna: Legend of the Unemployed Ninja, Fuuka
- Lairland Story, Somalina
- Marriage Royale, Minami Umeda
- Mashiroiro Symphony *mutsu no hana, Sana Inui
- Sucre Portable, Futaba Kai
