= Toshihiko Sahashi =

Japanese composer (born 1959)

Toshihiko Sahashi (佐橋 俊彦, Sahashi Toshihiko; born November 12, 1959 in Tokyo, Japan) is a Japanese composer. He graduated from Tokyo National University of Fine Arts and Music in 1986. Sahashi has composed music for various anime series (including OVAs, films, and drama CDs), video games, films, dramas, and musicals.

His works include the original soundtracks for Zipang, Ghost Sweeper Mikami, Mobile Suit Gundam SEED, Mobile Suit Gundam SEED Destiny, Gunslinger Girl, Black Blood Brothers, Ultraman Gaia, Ultraman Mebius, Seijuu Sentai Gingaman, Kamen Rider Kuuga, Kamen Rider Agito, Kamen Rider Hibiki, Kamen Rider Den-O, Full Metal Panic!, Hunter × Hunter, Simoun, Reborn! and composed all three Saint Seiya anime series. Together with the London Symphony Orchestra, two symphonic albums have been released, each arranging his compositions from Gundam SEED and Gundam SEED Destiny. For the Mobile Suit Gundam franchise's 30th anniversary, he again collaborated with the London Symphony Orchestra for another symphonic music album.

The style of his composition is richly symphonic and classical (occasionally jazz). The use of sophisticated compositional techniques, as well as complicated harmony writing such as fugue can often be heard in his work, demonstrating his solid training in the western classical music. He also uses keyboard instruments to deliver more sentimental soundtracks to good effect.

== Selected works ==
- Akazukin Chacha (TV)
- Angel Links (TV)
- The Big O (TV)
- Black Blood Brothers (TV)
- Blue Stinger (VG)
- Burn-Up Scramble (TV)
- Capeta (TV)
- Carried by the Wind: Tsukikage Ran (TV)
- Cooking Papa (TV)
- The Cosmopolitan Prayers (TV)
- Cutie Honey Flash (TV)
- Digimon Adventure: (2020 series) (TV)
- Element Hunters (TV)
- Fatal Fury 2: The New Battle (TV)
- Fatal Fury: Legend of the Hungry Wolf (TV)
- Fatal Fury: The Motion Picture
- Full Metal Panic! (TV)
- Full Metal Panic! Invisible Victory (TV)
- Full Metal Panic! The Second Raid (OVA)
- Full Metal Panic! The Second Raid (TV)
- Full Metal Panic? Fumoffu (TV)
- Future GPX Cyber Formula Saga (OVA)
- Future GPX Cyber Formula SIN (OVA)
- Gear Fighter Dendoh (TV)
- Gekisou Sentai Carranger (live-action TV)
- The Genius Prince's Guide to Raising a Nation Out of Debt (TV)
- Genji Tsūshin Agedama (TV)
- Ghost Sweeper Mikami (TV)
- Gunslinger Girl (TV)
- Haō Taikei Ryū Knight (TV)
- Haō Taikei Ryū Knight: Adeu's Legend (OVA)
- Haō Taikei Ryū Knight: Adeu's Legend II (OVA)
- Haō Taikei Ryū Knight: Adeu's Legend Final - Onsen Dungeon no Kettō (OVA)
- Hit o Nerae! (TV)
- Hunter × Hunter (1999 series) (TV)
- Hunter × Hunter (OVA)
- Hunter × Hunter: Greed Island (OVA)
- Hunter × Hunter: G.I. Final (OVA)
- Kamen Rider Agito (live-action TV)
- Kamen Rider Den-O (live-action TV)
- Kamen Rider Kuuga (live-action TV)
- Kamen Rider Hibiki (live-action TV)
- Kamen Rider Zi-O (live-action TV)
- Kamen Rider Geats (live-action TV)
- Kishin Corps (OAV)
- Kochira Katsushika-ku Kameari Kōen-mae Hashutsujo (TV)
- Kochira Katsushika-ku Kameari Kōen-mae Hashutsujo: The Movie
- Legend of Crystania (OVA)
- Love Love? (TV)
- Magic Knight Rayearth (OVA)
- Majin And The Forsaken Kingdom
- Mashin Hero Wataru (TV)
- Mobile Suit Gundam SEED (TV)
- Mobile Suit Gundam SEED: Special Edition (OVA)
- Mobile Suit Gundam SEED Destiny (TV)
- Mobile Suit Gundam SEED Destiny: Special Edition (OVA)
- Mobile Suit Gundam SEED Freedom (Movie)
- Nurse Angel Ririka SOS (Musical Live Stage)
- Partikelir (live-action movies)
- Pretty Guardian Sailor Moon (Musical, 20th anniversary stage: La Reconquista–Le Movement Final)
- Reborn! (TV)
- Rizelmine (TV)
- Sacred Seven (TV)
- Saint Seiya: Saintia Shō (TV)
- Saint Seiya: Soul of Gold (ONA)
- Saint Seiya Omega (TV)
- Seijuu Sentai Gingaman (live-action TV)
- Shin Kochira Katsushika-ku Kameari Kōen Mae Hashutsujo (TV)
- Simoun (TV)
- Steel Angel Kurumi (TV)
- Steel Angel Kurumi 2 (TV)
- Steel Angel Kurumi Encore (OVA)
- Steel Angel Kurumi Pure (live-action TV)
- Steel Angel Kurumi Zero (OVA)
- Superior Ultraman 8 Brothers (Movie)
- Tomica Hero: Rescue Fire (TV)
- Ultraman: The Ultimate Hero (live-action TV)
- Ultraman Gaia (live-action TV)
- Ultraman Mebius (live-action TV)
- Ultraman Mebius & Ultraman Brothers (Movie)
- Ultra Galaxy Mega Monster Battle (live-action TV)
- Vampiyan Kids (TV)
- Whistle! (TV)
- Zipang (TV)
- Zyuden Sentai Kyoryuger (live-action TV)
