= Kiyomi Asai =

Japanese voice actress (born 1974)

- 浅井 清己
- Born: April 12, 1974 (age 52); Tokyo, Japan
- Other names: Don Ohana (大花どん); Kiyosato Otomo (大友清里); Yuria Hokuto (ほくとゆりあ); Shin'ya Aizaki (愛咲深夜); Remi Haruno (春野レミ); Midori Amamiya (雨宮みどり)
- Occupation: Voice actress
- Years active: 1997–present
- Agent: D-Color

Kiyomi Asai (浅井 清己, Asai Kiyomi; born April 12, 1974) is a Japanese voice actress. She voiced Ayu Daikuuji in Rumbling Hearts and the web series Ayumayu Gekijou. Other voice roles include Lilynette Gingerbuck in Bleach, July in Darker than Black, Ganko Morikawa in Flame of Recca, Hyun in Geneshaft, Mayuko Asano in Great Teacher Onizuka, Hanabi Hyuga in Naruto, Seiko in Saikano and Tart in Tokyo Mew Mew. Asai used several pseudonyms on each games. She is associated with D-Color.

== Filmography ==
=== Anime ===
List of voice performances in anime
Year	Title	Role	Notes	Source
1988	Anpanman	Kon'nyakun		
1997	Flame of Recca	Ganko Morikawa		
1999	Great Teacher Onizuka	Mayuki Asano		
2000	Mighty Cat Masked Niyander	Child Gael		
2000	Ghost Stories	Aya Etō		
2001	Baki the Grappler	Yasuko, Nina		
2001	Gals!	Various characters		
2001	Geneshaft	Hyun		
2001–04	Moonlight Lady	Tomomi Harukawa	Adult OVA	
2002	Secret of Cerulean Sand	Kemal		
2002	Tokyo Underground	Student, receptionist		
2002	Tokyo Mew Mew	Tart		
2002	Saikano	Seiko		
2002	Sister Princess RePure	Announcer		
2003	Naruto	Hanabi Hyuga		
2003	Mermaid Melody Pichi Pichi Pitch	Schoolgirl		
2003	Mythical Detective Loki Ragnarok	Gullinbursti		
2003	Detective School Q	High School Girl		
2003	Ultra Maniac	Bamboo		
2003	Saiyuki Reload	Yunfa		
2003	Rumbling Hearts	Ayu Daikuuji		
2003	Galaxy Railways	Jane Goldman		
2003	Uninhabited Planet Survive!	Menori (child)		
2004	The Cosmopolitan Prayers	Miku Hayasaka, Ico Hsu	OVA series	
2004	Midori Days	Rascals		
2004	My-Hime	Miyu Greer		
2004	Kannazuki no Miko	Izumi		
2004	Bleach	Lilynette Gingerbuck		
2005	Majime ni Fumajime Kaiketsu Zorori	Kiyoshi		
2005	The Snow Queen	Olga		
2005	D.C.S.S. Da Capo Second Season	Children		
2005–09	Mai-Otome series	Miyu	Also Zwei, S.ifr	
2005	IGPX	Jessica	TV series	
2006	Ouran High School Host Club	Ayumi Munakata, Kimiko Sakurazuka		
2006	Powerpuff Girls Z	Victim OL		
2006	AyuMayu Theater	Ayu Daikuuji	web series	
2006	Shizuku-chan	Mami-chan		
2007	Naruto: Shippuden	Hanabi Hyuga		
2007	Darker than Black	July		
2008	Kimi ga Nozomu Eien Next Season	Ayu Daikuuji	OVA eps. 3-4	
2008	Sora no Iro, Mizu no Iro	Natsume Sorayama	OVA ep. 2; credited as Don Oohana	
2008	Shugo Chara! Doki	Chiyoko Nakayama		
2009	Tears to Tiara	Epona		
2009	Darker Than Black: Gemini Meteor	July		
2010	HeartCatch PreCure!	Naomi Sawai		
2010	Pokémon series	Matori		
2011	We Without Wings	Eriko Hino		
2017	Boruto: Naruto Next Generations	Hanabi Hyuga		

=== Films ===
List of voice performances in films
Year	Title	Role	Notes	Source
2014	The Last: Naruto the Movie	Hanabi Hyuga		

=== Video games ===
List of voice performances in video games
Year	Title	Role	Notes	Source
2001	Rumbling Hearts	Ayu Daikuuji	PC Adult	
2003	Saikano	Seiko	PS1/PS2	
2004–09	Like Life	Kizuna Rindōji, Okiru		
2004	Flame of Recca Final Burning	OniRin/Fujin	PS1/PS2	
2004	Moonlight Lady	Tomomi Harukawa	PC Adult	
2004	Sentimental Prelude ja:センチメンタルプレリュード	Hinano Ayasaki	PS1/PS2	
2005	Akiiro Renka	Mayu Tokura	PC Adult	
2005–09	Tears to Tiara	Epona	Also Of Corolla Earth and Avalon of Mystery	
2005–06	My-Hime games	Miyu Greer		
2005	Sakura Wars V	Ranmaru	PS1/PS2	
2005	Mythical Detective Loki Ragnarok	Gullinbursti	PS1/PS2	
2006	Muv-Luv	Irma Thesleff	PC Adult	
2006	My-Otome games	Miyu	PS1/PS2	
2006	WarioWare: Smooth Moves	Penny	Wii	
2007	Utsurigi Nanakoi Tenkiame	Hiyori Sagimiya	PC Adult (credited as Don Ohana)	
2007	Shinkyoku Sokai Polyphonica The Black	Matia Machiya	PC, also PS version in 2009	
2009–10	We Without Wings	Eriko Hino	PC Adult, As Don Ohana, also After Story	
2009	Boku no Natsuyasumi 4	Junior (Jiro Yoshida)	PSP	
2010	Everybody's Tennis Portable	Paula	PSP	
2015	Project X Zone 2: Brave New World	Ranmaru	DS	
2016	Naruto Shippuden: Ultimate Ninja Storm 4	Hanabi Hyuga		

=== Dubbing ===
List of voice performances in dubbing
Title	Role	Notes	Source
The Amityville Horror	Micahel Lutz		
Almost Famous	Estrella Star		
Enemy of the State	Eric Dean		
Casper	Casper	2004 DVD edition	
Charmed	Jenny Gordon		
Creative Galaxy	Arty		
Dog with a Blog	Avery		
Ed, Edd n Eddy	Marie Kanker		
Grey's Anatomy			
Hotelier	Kim Yun-Hee		
Island of Lost Souls	Sylvester		
Jessie			
Legally Blondes	Isabelle "Izzy" Woods		
Meet Dave	Josh Morrison		
Paw Patrol	Alex		
The Replacements	Riley Eugene Darling		
The Sopranos			

=== Drama CD ===
List of voice performances in drama CDs
Title	Role	Notes	Source
We Without Wings	Eriko Hino		
