= Imagin (studio) =

Japanese animation studio

Imagin Co., Ltd.
- Native name: イマジン株式会社
- Romanized name: Imajin kabushiki gaisha
- Type: Kabushiki gaisha
- Industry: Japanese animation
- Founded: June 15, 1992; 34 years ago
- Headquarters: Nerima, Tokyo, Japan
- Key people: Akio Sakai (President); Hiromi Yokoyama (Director)
- Revenue: 300,000,000 yen
- Number of employees: 22 (as of 2021)
- Subsidiaries: ANIK (1999–); A1C (2007–); GK Project (2009–)
- Website: imagin-do.co.jp

Imagin Co., Ltd (イマジン株式会社, Imajin kabushiki gaisha) is a Japanese animation studio located in Nerima, Tokyo, Japan. The company was established on June 15, 1992, by Akio Sakai, the current president, who had previously worked for Mushi Production, and Madhouse. The studio left the main television animation industry in 2011, but continues to produce animated works under its subsidiary A1C, which consists of several sub-labels, almost all of which are adult animation brands. Biscotti, ChuChu, Collaboration Works, Dark Shelf, Grand Cru, Grand Cru Borugeois, Grand Cru Noir, Majin, Nikihime no Dozeu, Nur, PoRO, Prime Time, Shelf, An DerCen and Suzuki Mirano are all labels owned by A1C and Imagin. Imagin's CEO, Akio Sakai, is the CEO of A1C, as well. In 1999, the studio also established Korean animation studio ANIK as a subsidiary company.

== Works ==
A list of works by Imagin, unless otherwise noted as a brand name owned by Imagin or its subsidiaries (ANIK, A1C, Prime Time, etc.).

=== Television series ===
- Z-Mind (1999, with Sunrise)
- Rizelmine (2002, with MADHOUSE)
- The Cosmopolitan Prayers (2004, with Studio Live)
- Hit wo Nerae! (2004, with Studio Live)
- Love Love? (2004, with Studio Live)
- Spice and Wolf (2008)

=== OVAs ===
- Dōkyūsei 2 Special: Sotsugyousei (1999–2000, with PP Project)
- Moonlight Lady (2001, episodes 1–4)
- A Foreign Love Affair (2007–2008, as Prime Time)
- Kirepapa (2008, as Prime Time)
- Houkago 2: Sayuri (2008, as Nihikime no Dozeu)
- Maiden Rose (2009, as Prime Time)
- Seito Kaichou ni Chuukoku (2009–2010, as Prime Time)
- The Tyrant Falls in Love (2010, as Prime Time)
- A Kiss for the Petals (2010, as ChuChu)
- Oppai Heart: Kanojo wa Kedamono Hatsujouki!? (2011–2012, as Nikihime no Dozeu)
- Eroge! H mo Game mo Kaihatsu Zanmai (2011–2016, as Collaboration Works)
- Euphoria (2011–2016, as Majin)
- Tight Rope (2012, as Prime Time)
- Please Rape Me! (2012, as Collaboration Works)
- Maki-chan to Nau. (2012–2014, as Collaboration Works)
- Tropical Kiss (2012–2014, as Collaboration Works)
- Tsugou no Yoi Sexfriend? (2012–2015, as Collaboration Works)
- Kuroinu: Kedakaki Seijo wa Hakudaku ni Somaru (2012–2018, as Majin)
- Kuro to Kin no Akanai Kagi. (2013, as An DerCen)
- Kotowari: Kimi no Kokoro no Koboreta Kakera (2013, as Nikihime no Dozeu)
- Mankitsu Happening (2015, as Collaboration Works)
- Ero Manga! H mo Manga mo Step-up (2015–2016, as Collaboration Works)
- Trick or Alice (2016, as An DerCen)
- Baka na Imouto o Rikou ni Suru no wa Ore no XX Dake na Ken ni Tsuite (2016, as Collaboration Works)
- Imouto to Sono Yuujin ga Ero Sugite Ore no Kokan ga Yabai (2016, as Collaboration Works)
- Menhera Ayuri no Yamanai Onedari: Headphone wa Hazusenai (2017, as Collaboration Works)
- Katainaka ni Totsui de Kita Russia Musume to H Shimakuru Ohanashi (2017–2018, as Collaboration Works)
- Dokidoki Little Ooyasan (2018–2019, as Collaboration Works)
- Tiny Evil (2018–2019, as Majin)
- Muma no Machi Cornelica (2018–2019, as Majin)
- Ochi Mono RPG Seikishi Luvilias (2019, as Majin)
- Isekai Harem Monogatari (2020, as Majin)
- Knight of Erin (2020–2021, as Majin)
- Enjo Kouhai (2020–2024, as Majin)
- Usamimi Bouken-tan: Sekuhara Shinagara Sekai wo Sukue (2021–2022, as Majin)
- Mecha Gishi Risuta no Dai Bōken (2025-present, as Majin)

== A1C Brands ==
- Suzuki Mirano (adult animation brand, founded 2007)
- Prime Time (non-adult animation brand, founded 2007)
- 2-Hikime no Dozeu (adult animation brand, founded 2008)
- PoRO (adult animation brand, founded 2009)
- chuchu (adult animation brand, founded 2010)
- Grand Cru (adult game brand, founded 2010)
- Majin Label (adult animation brand, founded 2011)
- An DerCen (animation brand, founded 2012)
- Mousou Senka (adult animation brand, founded 2021)

== Notable staff ==
=== Representative staff ===
- Akio Sakai (founder and president)
- Hiromi Yokoyama (company director, also an animator and director at the studio)

=== Directors ===
- Jun Shishido (2000–2009)
- Takeo Takahashi (2000–2010)
- Masayuki Sakoi (2000–2011)
- Hajime Ootani (2005–2011)

=== Animators ===
- Tamotsu Ogawa (???)
- Tomoyasu Kurashima (1998~2000)
- Takahiro Miura (animator) (1999~2001)
