= Moonlight Lady (OVA) =

2000 video game

- Kao no nai tsuki official logo

顔のない月 (Kao no Nai Tsuki)
- Genre: Erotica, romance, supernatural
- Video game

顔のない月 No Surface Moon
- Developer: Root
- Publisher: Orbit Co., Ltd.
- Platform: Microsoft Windows 95+
- Released: December 22, 2000
- Original video animation

No Surface Moon The Animation
- Directed by: Toshiharu Sato
- Written by: Masanobu Arakawa
- Studio: Imagin (#1–4); Orada Company (#5)
- Licensed by: Kitty Media
- Released: December 28, 2001
- Runtime: 30 minutes (per episode)
- Episodes: 5

Moonlight Lady (顔のない月, Kao no Nai Tsuki; lit. Faceless Moon) is the American release title for No Surface Moon The Animation; a 2001 Japanese OVA anime series adapted from the 2000 Japanese visual novel eroge of the same name. It was created by Orbit Co., Ltd., animated by IMAGIN, and produced by Pink Pineapple, and later licensed by Media Blasters, English dubbed by Wave Form Solutions (ep. 1–4), Sunlight Audio (ep. 5), and distributed by Kitty Media.

The original Japanese adult game placed fourth overall in the 2001 BugBug readers' choice awards.

The remake version, Kao no Nai Tsuki - Matsuyoi no Sotsubaki, was scheduled for release on August 29, 2025.

== Synopsis ==
Suzuna Kuraki is a beautiful young woman apprenticing to become a priestess of her wealthy, matrilineal family's Shinto faith. As part of her initiation, she must not only practice consecration, but also enter an arranged marriage by her grandmother and subsequently participate in the decadal Tsukimachi ceremony, an esoteric ritual held to welcome a new female minister. However, things starts to get complicated when her fiance, Koichi Hayama, is brought to her estate and a mysterious paranormal energy begins making her act somewhat strangely.

== Characters ==
=== Primary characters ===
Suzuna Kuraki (倉木 鈴菜, Kuraki Suzuna)
Voiced by: Sanae Kobayashi (ep. 1-4), Hiroko Taguchi (ep. 5) (Japanese); Wendy Carmichael (English) (ep. 1-4), Janet Moltow (ep. 5)
A typical high school student, Suzuna Kuraki is the protagonist of the series. She is a delicate, beautiful young woman, training to become a priestess of her Shinto ancestry so that she may properly consecrate her family shrine; a job traditionally bestowed upon the women of her lineage. Outside of her religious services, Suzuna generally behaves in a very aristocratic, conceited and fastidious manner, even though she is in fact the most apprehensive and solicitous person in the house. Suzuna is the obligatory fiancée of Koichi Hayama by arranged marriage, sister of Mizuna and daughter of Yuriko.

Koichi Hayama (羽山 浩一, Hayama Kōichi)
Voiced by: Akira Ishida (Japanese); Jake Carpenteria (English) (ep. 1-4), Rob Weir (ep. 5)
Koichi Hayama is the fiancé of Suzuna Kuraki. He was subconsciously chosen as her fiance and subsequently brought to the estate to live while the Tsukimachi ceremony approaches. A tall and handsome university student, Koichi tends to clash with Suzuna, but this can be regarded as evidence of a tsundere love affair. By the effects of an unexplained illness, he is unable to recollect any of his past, including his childhood or parents. He also could not recognize the faces of women before coming to the Kuraki estate. Koichi is a frequent smoker and has an elongated scar across his chest.

=== Secondary characters ===
Tomomi Harukawa (春川 知美, Harukawa Tomomi)
Voiced by: Kiyomi Asai (Japanese); Jennifer Marsala (English) (ep. 1-4), Lara Linndy (ep. 5)
Employed maidservant and childhood friend of Suzuna Kuraki. Despite her noticeably sizable bust, Tomomi is a very slow, gentle, soft-spoken girl who often meticulously strives to please those being served; particularly Suzuna, who is her foil. She is the only bespectacled member of the household and the most bisexually promiscuous. Tomomi is a niece to Gohei Harukawa and granddaughter to Ippei.

Sayaka Kurihara (栗原 沙也加, Kurihara Sayaka)
Voiced by: Naoko Takano (Japanese); Trina White (English) (ep. 1-4), Sharon Simpson (ep. 5), Brenda Lewis (as Ruri Yamato)
The second maidservant of the household, Sayaka Kurihara is roughly the opposite of Tomomi in that she is upbeat, playful, talkative, and at times childish. Although she is unable to ever clearly remember, Sayaka did in fact used to be a renowned promotional model and actress by the name of Ruri Yamato; acquired when she was found wandering the estate grounds by Gohei Harukawa.

Io Azuma (東 衣緒, Azuma Io)
Voiced by: Yukari Honma (Japanese); Laddy McFarren (English)
Friendly yet inept, Io Azuma is a distant cousin of Suzuna and is good friends with Tomomi. He was originally chosen to be a suitor for Suzuna, but much to her disappointment, he became somewhat effeminate instead of the charming gentleman she was expecting. A devout otaku, Io frequently spends most of his leisure in the house library reading manga; playfully extending his obsession to Suzuna who, much to her chagrin, he tends to address with the Japanese honorific title Chan. He and Koichi have no sexual contact in the anime, unlike in the original game.

Yuriko Kuraki (倉木 由利子, Kuraki Yuriko)
Voiced by: Miki Itō (Japanese); Jessica Gee (English) (ep. 1-4), Molly Walters (ep. 5)
Yuriko Kuraki is the biological mother of both Suzuna and Mizuna, widow of her late husband Zenzirō and matriarch of the house. A mysterious and voluptuous woman, Yuriko is by far the most influential figure over the household and the paranormal force that manifests within it; exhibiting this position with formality in both her voice and clothes.

Gohei Harukawa (春川 五平, Harukawa Gohei)
Voiced by: Michael Johnston (English, ep. 1-4), Brian Drewberry (ep. 5)
Ominous and inscrutable, Gohei Harukawa is the great-uncle of Tomomi, older brother of Ippei and estate landscaper; even though he is rarely ever seen doing garden work. While he does not have supernatural powers of his own, Gohei frequently assists Yuriko with her endeavors; such as triggering events in preparation for the Tsukimachi ceremony.

Mizuna Kuraki (倉木 水菜, Kuraki Mizuna)
First daughter of Yuriko and monozygotic twin sister of Suzuna. Unlike her younger sister, Mizuna is very taciturn, yet cheerfully playful; living silently and peacefully in the water caverns beneath the mansion. She was once the shrine maiden for the Kuraki family, but when Suzuna was born she was cast away.

Chikako Sawaguchi (沢口 千賀子, Sawaguchi Chikako)
Voiced by: Jessica Gee (English)
Chikako Sawaguchi is a professor of psychology who visits the estate in response to sensing paranormal activity. Besides that, not much else is known about her except that she is a past teacher of Koichi.

Ippei Harukawa (春川 一平, Harukawa Ippei)
Older brother of Gohei, grandfather of Tomomi and family physician. Has no significant role in the series.

== Episodes ==
No.	Title	Original release date
1	"The First Night: Camellia" "Tsubaki" (椿)	December 28, 2001
2	"The Second Night: Sunflower" "Himawari" (向日葵)	July 26, 2002
3	"The Third Night: Peony" "Shakuyaku" (芍薬)	December 27, 2002
4	"The Fourth Night: White Lily" "Shirayuri" (白百合)	June 13, 2003
5	"The Fifth Night: Amaryllis" "Higanbana" (彼岸花)	July 23, 2004

== Music ==
- Closing theme: "Cruel Moon" by Arca, 2001 (Epi. 1–5)

== Credits ==
=== Japanese staff ===
Original Story 顔のない月 No Surface Moon

Planning Piston Horaguchi
Assistant Planning Endo Kei

Producer Oruga Susumu

Original Plan and Supervisor Carnelian
Composition and Script Arakawa Masanobu

Animation Studio Imagin Co., Ltd
Character Design and Chief Animator Ishihara Megumi
Assistant Animator Hattori Noritomo
Director and Storyboards Sato Toshiharu

Production Pink Pineapple

Music Hiroshi Igarashi

=== American staff ===
Producer Gary Sierra

Production Supervisor Jharmoni Nagasaki
Production Assistant Roller Girl

Editor Scottie Mack

Translation J. Yoshizawa

Design Temper-Tantric

== Sequels ==
=== Spin-offs ===
On April 3, 2007, Studio Deen released 桃華月憚 (Touka Gettan); an animated adaption of the 2007 Japanese visual novel eroge and manga of the same name. All three versions are the same spin-off of 顔のない月 (Kao no nai tsuki). The animation aired from April 3, 2007, to September 24, 2007, on BS Asahi, SUN TV, and Tokyo MX TV. The series was directed by Yūji Yamaguchi.
