= Passione (company) =

Japanese animation studio

Passione Co., Ltd.
- Native name: 株式会社パッショーネ
- Romanized name: Kabushiki-gaisha Passhōne
- Type: Kabushiki gaisha
- Industry: Japanese animation
- Founded: January 26, 2011; 15 years ago
- Founders: Kazuhiro Saitō
- Headquarters: Asagayaminami, Suginami, Tokyo, Japan
- Key people: Kazuhiro Saitō (CEO); Takeo Takahashi (director)
- Total equity: ¥9,500,000
- Number of employees: 25
- Website: passione-anime.com

Passione Co., Ltd. (Japanese: 株式会社パッショーネ, Hepburn: Kabushiki-gaisha Passhōne) is a Japanese animation studio founded in 2011.

== History ==
Passione was founded on January 26, 2011, by Kazuhiro Saitō, former production manager of Studio Fantasia.

On July 24, 2022, publisher MF Bunko J announced that Passione would produce the anime adaptation of the light novel series The Demon Sword Master of Excalibur Academy, with Hiroyuki Morita and Yuji Nomi revealed in March 2023 to be the series director and composer, respectively. The series is Morita and Nomi's first collaboration and television work in over a decade, having previously worked together on The Cat Returns (2002) under Studio Ghibli and Bokurano (2007) under Gonzo.

Passione, alongside anime studios Hayabusa Film and Saetta, currently operates an anime themed bar in Osaka named "Anime Cafe&Bar CUE LAMP", which opened on April 10, 2023.

== Works ==
=== Television series ===
| No. | Title | Series director(s) | Series writer(s) | Year(s) | Network | Co-production(s) | Notes |
2010s
| 1 | Haitai Nanafa | Hiroshi Kimura | Kenji Konuta | 2012–2013 | QAB | | |
| 2 | Rail Wars! | Yoshifumi Sueda | Masashi Suzuki | 2014 | TBS | | |
| 3 | Rokka: Braves of the Six Flowers | Takeo Takahashi | Tatsuhiko Urahata | 2015 | MBS | | |
| 4 | Hinako Note | Takeo Takahashi (Note: Credited as Chief Director (総監督, Sō Kantoku).); Tooru Kitahata | Tatsuhiko Urahata | 2017 | AT-X | | |
| 5 | Citrus | Takeo Takahashi | Naoki Hayashi | 2018 | AT-X | | |
| 6 | High School DxD Hero | Yoshifumi Sueda | Kenji Konuta | 2018 | AT-X | | Season four of High School DxD |
| 7 | Wasteful Days of High School Girls | Takeo Takahashi; Hijiri Sanpei | Masahiro Yokotani | 2019 | AT-X | | |
| 8 | Z/X Code reunion | Yoshifumi Sueda | Tatsuhiko Urahata | 2019 | Tokyo MX | | |
2020s
| 9 | Interspecies Reviewers | Yuki Ogawa | Kazuyuki Fudeyasu | 2020 | AT-X | | |
| 10 | Higurashi: When They Cry – Gou | Keiichiro Kawaguchi | Naoki Hayashi | 2020–2021 | Tokyo MX; BS11 | | |
| 11 | Higurashi: When They Cry – Sotsu | Keiichiro Kawaguchi | Naoki Hayashi | 2021 | Tokyo MX; BS11 | | |
| 12 | Mieruko-chan | Yuki Ogawa | Kenta Ihara | 2021 | AT-X; Tokyo MX; KBS Kyoto; SUN; BS NTV | | |
| 13 | Harem in the Labyrinth of Another World | Naoyuki Tatsuwa | Kurasumi Sunayama | 2022 | AT-X; Tokyo MX | | |
| 14 | Love Flops | Nobuyoshi Nagayama | Ryō Yasumoto | 2022 | AT-X; Tokyo MX; KBS Kyoto; SUN; BS11 | | |
| 15 | Yuri Is My Job! | Hijiri Sanpei | Naoki Hayashi | 2023 | AT-X; Tokyo MX | Studio Lings | |
| 16 | The Demon Sword Master of Excalibur Academy | Hiroyuki Morita | Kunihiko Okada | 2023 | TV Tokyo; BS Fuji | | |
| 17 | Ishura | Takeo Takahashi; Yuki Ogawa | Kenta Ihara | 2024–2025 | Tokyo MX; BS NTV | Sanzigen (CG animation) | |
| 18 | Spice and Wolf: Merchant Meets the Wise Wolf | Takeo Takahashi; Hijiri Sanpei | Tatsuhiko Urahata (Note: Credited as Series composition (シリーズ構成, Shirīzu kōsei) for Cour 1 only.); Yukito Kizawa (Note: Credited as Series composition (シリーズ構成, Shirīzu kōsei) for Cour 2 only.); Yuki Nekota | 2024 | TV Tokyo | | |
| 19 | Loner Life in Another World | Akio Kazumi | Kenta Ihara | 2024 | AT-X; Tokyo MX | Hayabusa Film; Frontier Engine (Production cooperation) | |
| 20 | From Old Country Bumpkin to Master Swordsman | Akio Kazumi | Kunihiko Okada | 2025 | TV Asahi | Hayabusa Film | |
| 21 | Nukitashi the Animation | Nobuyoshi Nagayama | Kenta Ihara | 2025 | AT-X; BS11; GBS; KBS Kyoto; MTV | | |
| 22 | Chained Soldier (season 2) | Masafumi Tamura | Yasuhiro Nakanishi | 2026 | Tokyo MX; BS Asahi; MBS; AT-X | Hayabusa Film | |
| 23 | From Old Country Bumpkin to Master Swordsman (season 2) | Akio Kazumi | Kunihiko Okada | 2026 | TV Asahi | Hayabusa Film | |
| 24 | FX Fighter Kurumi-chan | Yuki Ogawa | Kenta Ihara | 2026 | AT-X; Tokyo MX; BS11; Kansai TV | | |
| 25 | Even the Student Council Has Its Holes! | Naoyuki Tatsuwa | Masahiro Yokotani | 2026 | Tokyo MX; BS11; GTV; GYT | | |
| 26 | Spice and Wolf: Merchant Meets the Wise Wolf (season 2) | Takeo Takahashi; Hijiri Sanpei; Nobuyoshi Nagayama; Takahiro Majima | TBA | 2027 | TV Tokyo | | |
| TBA | Dokagui Daisuki! Mochizuki-san | TBA | TBA | TBA | TBA | | |
| TBA | Kusunoki's Flunking Her High School Glow-Up | Midori Yui | Midori Yui | TBA | TBA | Hayabusa Film | |
| TBA | The Fake Alchemist | Takeo Takahashi; Hijiri Sanpei | Kenta Ihara | TBA | TBA | | |

==== Related productions ====
| Title | Director(s) | Year(s) | Network | Notes |
|---|---|---|---|---|
| Rinshi!! Ekoda-chan | Takeo Takahashi | 2019 | Tokyo MX | Episode 9 only |

=== Original video animation ===
| Year | Title | Director(s) | Eps. | Note(s) | Refs. |
|---|---|---|---|---|---|
| 2018 | God Eater Rezo Nantoka Gekijou | Paraco Sasahara | 8 | Co-production with Creators in Pack | |
| 2019 | The Island of Giant Insects | Takeo Takahashi; Naoyuki Tatsuwa | 1 | Later expanded into a feature-length film | |
| 2021 | Bean Bandit | Kenichi Sonoda | 1 | Based on Sonoda's 1989 OVA Riding Bean | |

=== Films ===
| Film | Release date | Director(s) | Writer(s) | Based on/Inspired by | Producer(s) | Composer(s) | Notes |
|---|---|---|---|---|---|---|---|
| The Island of Giant Insects | January 10, 2020 | Takeo Takahashi; Naoyuki Tatsuwa | Shigeru Morita | Manga by Yasutaka Fujimi | Tatsuya Ishiguro; Yūki Yamaoka; Jun Itō; Fumihiro Ozawa; Yukari Kuwayama | Akinari Suzuki; Nilsson Johannes | |
| Ōmuro-ke: Dear Sisters | February 2, 2024 | Naoyuki Tatsuwa | Masahiro Yokotani | Manga by Namori | | Yūsuke Shirato | Co-production with Studio Lings |
| Ōmuro-ke: Dear Friends | June 21, 2024 | Naoyuki Tatsuwa | Masahiro Yokotani | Manga by Namori | | Yūsuke Shirato | Co-production with Studio Lings |
