= FX Fighter Kurumi-chan =

Japanese manga series

- First tankōbon volume cover

FX戦士くるみちゃん (FX Senshi Kurumi-chan)
- Genre: Psychological thriller Slice of life
- Manga
- Written by: Demunyan
- Illustrated by: Daisuki Tansan
- Published by: Media Factory
- Imprint: MF Comics Flapper Series
- Magazine: Monthly Comic Flapper
- Original run: February 5, 2021 – present
- Volumes: 10
- Anime television series
- Directed by: Yuki Ogawa
- Written by: Kenta Ihara
- Music by: Takurō Iga
- Studio: Passione
- Licensed by: Crunchyroll (streaming): SEA: Medialink
- Original network: AT-X, Tokyo MX, BS11, Kansai TV
- Original run: October 1, 2026 – present
- Episodes: 8
- icon

FX Fighter Kurumi-chan (Japanese: FX戦士くるみちゃん, Hepburn: FX Senshi Kurumi-chan) is a Japanese manga series written by Demunyan and illustrated by Daisuki Tansan. It was originally published as a web comic on Demunyan's personal website, before beginning serialization in Media Factory's Monthly Comic Flapper magazine in February 2021. An anime television series adaptation produced by Passione premiered in October 2026.

== Plot ==
When she was in middle school, Kurumi Fukuga's mother Kozue became involved in foreign exchange (FX) margin trading. However, Kozue had secretly been using the family's money, which caused her to lose ¥20 million (equivalent to ¥22.41 million or US$148,047.51 in 2024) following the bankruptcy of Lehman Brothers and its associated fallout. Unable to bear with the losses and their possible effects on their family, Kozue commits suicide, devastating Kurumi. Vowing to avenge what happened, Kurumi spends her high school and university years becoming interested in FX, hoping to earn back the 20 million her mother lost. Despite some early successes and her good intentions, she realizes that margin trading has its consequences.

== Characters ==
Kurumi Fukuga (福賀 くるみ, Fukuga Kurumi)
Voiced by: Aina Suzuki (Japanese); Kimoy Lee (English)
A 20-year-old university student. After her mother committed suicide because of the Lehman Shock, Kurumi got involved in FX to earn back the money. She initially found success in FX, but eventually suffered losses after being influenced to make bad trades. Despite initially quitting FX after her father Ikuo finds out about her trading activities, she is unable to stay away from trading and resumes her activities. She tries to hide her trading activities from her father.
Mochiko Kogane (小金 萌智子, Kogane Mochiko)
Voiced by: Asami Seto (Japanese); Eurie Nam (English)
Kurumi's university classmate. Although she was an academic prodigy, her poor relationships and difficult past led to her looking down on others. She became interested in Kurumi and influenced her activities as an FX trader.
Mebuki Yamashi (山師 芽吹, Yamashi Mebuki)
Voiced by: Ayasa Itō (Japanese); LilyPichu (English)
Another FX trader who becomes associated with Mochiko and Kurumi. She is a beginner and is completely ignorant about FX, which she believes is the easiest way to earn money.
Yasuko Takane (高根 やす子, Takane Yasuko)
Voiced by: Miho Okasaki (Japanese); Michelle Marie (English)
Mebuki's friend and an aspiring visual designer. She previously ran a finance blog, but ceased blogging after she suffered financial losses. After becoming involved with the others, she sets a goal of becoming a manga artist.
Ikuo Fukuga (福賀 郁夫, Fukuga Ikuo)
Voiced by: Hideo Ishikawa (Japanese); Cory Yee (English)
Kurumi's father and Kozue's husband. After Kozue's death, he advised Kurumi not to get into FX trading. Years later, when he found out that Kurumi was engaging in FX trading using his money, she temporarily quits.
Kozue Fukuga (福賀 梢, Fukuga Kozue)
Voiced by: Mamiko Noto (Japanese); Kate Clarke (English)
Kurumi's mother and Ikuo's wife. Originally a housewife, she discovered FX trading and became addicted to it. However, due to being poor with numbers, as well as the Lehman Shock, she lost ¥20 million. Unable to cope with the financial loss and the possibility of Ikuo finding out, she ends her life by jumping off a building.

== Media ==
=== Manga ===
Written by Demunyan, FX Fighter Kurumi-chan was posted as a web comic on the author's personal website on October 18, 2016, before later being serialized and published by Media Factory under its Monthly Comic Flapper magazine with illustrations by Daisuki Tansan, on February 5, 2021. The first tankōbon volume was released on July 21, 2021, with ten volumes released as of September 18, 2026.

No.	Release date	ISBN
1	July 21, 2021	978-4-04-680668-0
2	January 21, 2022	978-4-04-681040-3
3	August 23, 2022	978-4-04-681622-1
4	February 21, 2023	978-4-04-682275-8
5	July 22, 2023	978-4-04-682703-6
6	March 23, 2024	978-4-04-683423-2
7	September 21, 2024	978-4-04-683939-8
8	May 22, 2025	978-4-04-684744-7
9	January 22, 2026	978-4-04-685421-6
10	September 18, 2026	978-4-04-660460-6

=== Anime ===
An anime television series adaptation was announced on January 19, 2026. It is produced by Passione and directed by Yuki Ogawa, with Shintarō Matsushima serving as assistant director, Kenta Ihara handling series composition, Kazuyuki Ueda designing the characters, and Takurō Iga composing the music. The series premiered on October 1, 2026, on AT-X and other networks. The opening theme song is "FX Senshi Kurumi-chan" (FX戦士くるみちゃん), while the ending theme song is "$・¥・€", both performed by Aina Suzuki as her character Kurumi Fukuga. Crunchyroll is streaming the series. Medialink licensed the series in Southeast Asia.

==== Episodes ====
No.	Title	Directed by	Written by	Storyboarded by	Original release date
1	"What's Forex?"; Transliteration: "FX tte, Nāni?" (Japanese: FXって、なぁに？)	Shintarou Matsushima	Kenta Ihara	Yuki Ogawa	October 1, 2026
When Kurumi Fukuga is in middle school, her mother loses ¥20 million through FX margin trading due to the Lehman Shock. Fearing her parents will divorce, she starts studying FX trading in hopes of recovering the lost funds herself. On the day her father is supposed to return home from a trip, she insists that her mother come clean about the FX debt to him, causing her to commit suicide. Her father subsequently warns her to never trade FX, but Kurumi blames herself for her mother's death and wonders if she could have done something to clear the debt. Five years later, Kurumi, now a third-year college student and of legal age to trade FX, opens a trading account with ¥300,000 of her savings. She is determined to quickly earn back the ¥20 million, opting for a high-risk overseas broker rather than a domestic one. She opens a 30-lot long position on USD/JPY. Although she initially secures an unrealized profit of ¥24,000, a sudden market reversal wipes out her gains. As her losses mount, Kurumi spirals into a breakdown.
2	"It's Okay, I've Got Leverage"; Transliteration: "Rebarejji Arukara Daijōbu~♪" (Japanese: レバレッジあるから大丈夫ぅ♪)	Shintarou Matsushima	Kenta Ihara	Yuki Ogawa	October 8, 2026
Kurumi manages to recoup the losses after another market reversal. After three months of trading, she builds a profit of ¥500,000, but the USD/JPY market begins to stagnate. Mochiko Kogane, her university classmate who also trades FX, introduces her to the surging AUD/JPY pair. Kurumi opens a 50-lot long position on AUD/JPY at ¥95.61 – leveraged at an extreme 59 times her account balance. She is overjoyed when her unrealized profit tops at ¥150,000, but the market soon reverses downward. Convinced the pair will climb back to at least ¥96, she cannot bring herself to cut her losses. She predicts the market will bounce back after hitting ¥94, but she realizes, to her horror, that ¥94 is her forced liquidation line, so she stands to lose her entire balance before she can see any gains. Unwilling to accept this, she takes ¥3 million from her father's stashed savings, intending to inject it into her balance to lower her forced liquidation line.
3	"Do I Have to Cut My Losses...?"; Transliteration: "Sonkiri Shinakya, Dame……?" (Japanese: 損切りしなきゃ、だめ……？)	Tatsuya Hagino	Kenta Ihara	Naruse Takahashi	October 15, 2026
Thanks to an infusion of additional funds from her father's savings, Kurumi manages to avoid forced liquidation, and the market begins to look as if it will rally. To try to make back her losses more quickly, Kurumi impulsively buys additional lots, increasing her leverage. However, the rally quickly reverses again, and the market begins dropping to record lows. Believing that she will hit her new forced liquidation line and eat the entire loss, Kurumi switches off her monitor and refuses to look at the trades for the rest of the night. She then reflects that she fooled herself into thinking she was skilled at FX trading due to her initial successes, and that she is no different from her mother. The next day, Mochiko meets Kurumi, who is convinced she was forced to liquidate and still hasn't checked the market. Mochiko is revealed to be secretly using Kurumi as a case study for her own trades and convinces Kurumi to check the market. They are both shocked that the AUD/JPY market rallied overnight enough for Kurumi to make a large profit. Kurumi is relieved she didn't suffer a total loss, while Mochiko is unhappy Kurumi got out of her situation through sheer luck.
4	"Having No Unrealized Losses Is the Best"; Transliteration: "Fukumizon ga Naitte Saiko〜♡" (Japanese: 含み損がないってサイコ〜♡)	Shunichi Kato	Kenta Ihara	Hiroyuki Morita	October 22, 2026
Mochiko helps rookie FX trader Yamashi Mebuki set up an FX account, but unwilling to provide any further instruction, she directs Mebuki to seek out Kurumi. Meanwhile, as Kurumi plans to secretly return the ¥3 million she borrowed from her father, she realizes she will eventually need to report her FX earnings on her tax returns, which means she can no longer hide her trading from her father. However, he discovers her theft of the savings, and she is forced to come clean about her FX trading. He expresses his disappointment in Kurumi and pleads for her to quit FX trading. Kurumi announces her intention to retire to Mochiko, but Mochiko convinces her to at least take on Mebuki as an apprentice. Mebuki confides in Kurumi that she wants to get into FX trading as an easy way to earn money without having to work, and has already put her student aid into the GBP/JPY market as starting funds. Kurumi predicts the GBP will drop in value, and Mebuki impulsively opens a short position. Kurumi's prediction proves true as the GBP falls sharply. Realizing she could have made a major profit if she had shorted as well, Kurumi feels the temptation to resume FX trading.
5	"Long? Short? Which Do I Choose?"; Transliteration: "Rongu? Shōto? Dotchi ni Suru?" (Japanese: ロング？ショート？どっちにする？)	Satoshi Saga	Kenta Ihara	Hiroko Kazui	October 29, 2026
Two weeks later, Mebuki tells her friend Takane Yasuko, who is also secretly an FX trader, that she has been making successful trades thanks to Kurumi's predictions. However, Yasuko warns Mebuki not to meddle in FX trading, especially with a high-risk currency like GBP. Meanwhile, Kurumi continues to feel tempted to return to FX trading. Realizing she had dedicated her entire childhood to studying for FX trading, Kurumi decides to pick up another hobby to replace it. However, feeling that her life has gone to waste and jealous of Mebuki's success, Kurumi gives in to her inner demon, symbolically cutting away her childhood innocence to return to FX trading. Some time later, Mebuki brings Yasuko to meet Kurumi and Mochiko and suggests they compete to see who can make the most money from FX trading.
6	"Pay Attention to Economic Indicators!"; Transliteration: "Keizai Shihyō ni Chūmoku desu!" (Japanese: 経済指標には注目ですっ！)	TBA	TBA	TBA	November 5, 2026
Deciding to play it safe, Yasuko starts trading on the more stable EUR/USD market. She takes a long position when she believes the market has bottomed out, only to be shocked when the market falls even further. Kurumi and Mochiko meanwhile predicted the drop and took short positions instead. Yasuko decides to cut her losses and is vindicated when the market drops even further. The next day, Mebuki considers taking a long position on GBP, but Kurumi warns her to wait and see the market direction first. That night, Mebuki argues with her parents over her finances, and she impulsively takes a high-leverage long position on GBP/USD. However, her ignorance of economic indicators means she fails to notice that the United Kingdom announced it wasn't likely going to increase interest rates, causing investors to short GBP en masse, and Mebuki goes into forced liquidation and loses her initial ¥200,000 investment. Desperate to recoup her losses, Mebuki invests her ¥600,000 student aid funds into a short position on USD/JPY, hoping the yen continues to fall. However, the market suddenly rallies, putting her in danger of another forced liquidation.
7	"I Don't Wanna Have a Forced Liquidation..."; Transliteration: "Kyōseirosukatto Nante Yada Mon……" (Japanese: 強制ロスカットなんてヤダもん……)	TBA	TBA	TBA	November 12, 2026
In desperation, Mebuki begins investing her monthly student aid payments directly into her FX account to stave off forced liquidation as the yen continues to rise against USD. However, the market rises faster than she can deposit money. Kurumi, Mochiko, and Yasuko then meet at Mebuki's apartment to lay down the ground rules for their competition, where the girl who manages to grow their investment account by the greatest percentage by Christmas will be declared the winner and buy dinner for everybody else. Yasuko admits she will likely lose, while Mochiko lies about losing money. Kurumi reveals that thanks to going long on the yen, she has made a massive profit and her portfolio has grown by 73%. After Kurumi and Yasuko leave, Mebuki confides in Mochiko about her current predicament. Mochiko deliberately gives Mebuki questionable advice, telling her to keep funneling money into her FX account since her parents will end up paying for it, assuring her USD/JPY will eventually fall, and revealing Kurumi won her fortune through sheer luck on AUD/JPY. Mebuki carefully watches the market and is relieved when there is a miraculous drop, removing the danger of forced liquidation. The next day, Kurumi predicts USD/JPY will rise again, but Mebuki, now convinced Kurumi's predictions were all luck, stubbornly holds her short position. Yasuko advises her to cash out while she can and avoid getting emotionally invested, but Mebuki ignores her and seeks Mochiko's advice instead. However, Mochiko lies to Mebuki and convinces her the market will fall.
8	"Monetary Easing Is a Wild Party"; Transliteration: "Kin'yū Kanwa wa Kyōran Pātī" (Japanese: 金融緩和は狂乱パーティ♪)	TBA	TBA	TBA	November 19, 2026
The Bank of Japan announces it will be implementing monetary easing, which causes the USD/JPY market to rise sharply. Kurumi is excited at having made a massive profit, but decides to buy additional lots for a long position with the expectation the market will rise further. Mebuki checks the market and is shocked that the sudden rise sent her into forced liquidation while she wasn't paying attention. In desperation, she maxes out her credit cards to purchase a new short position, only to be dismayed when the market continues to rise. Following Mochiko's advice, Mebuki decides to take out a student loan to attain more funds. While shopping for suits for job hunting, Kurumi, Mochiko, and Yasuko further discuss trading until Yasuko decides to quit trading to focus on her manga. The subject then switches to Mebuki as Yasuko and Kurumi suspect she suffered heavy losses, with Kurumi being particularly concerned when she tells them how her mother committed suicide over FX. The market continues to rise, risking another forced liquidation for Mebuki. She asks Kurumi for a loan, but Kurumi refuses, advising her to cut her losses. Warned by Kurumi, Yasuko attempts to confront Mebuki but finds she isn't home. Mebuki arrives at Mochiko's apartment and begs her for a loan.
