= Ryukyu Broadcasting Corporation =

Radio and television broadcaster in Okinawa Prefecture, Japan

- Logo used since 2024

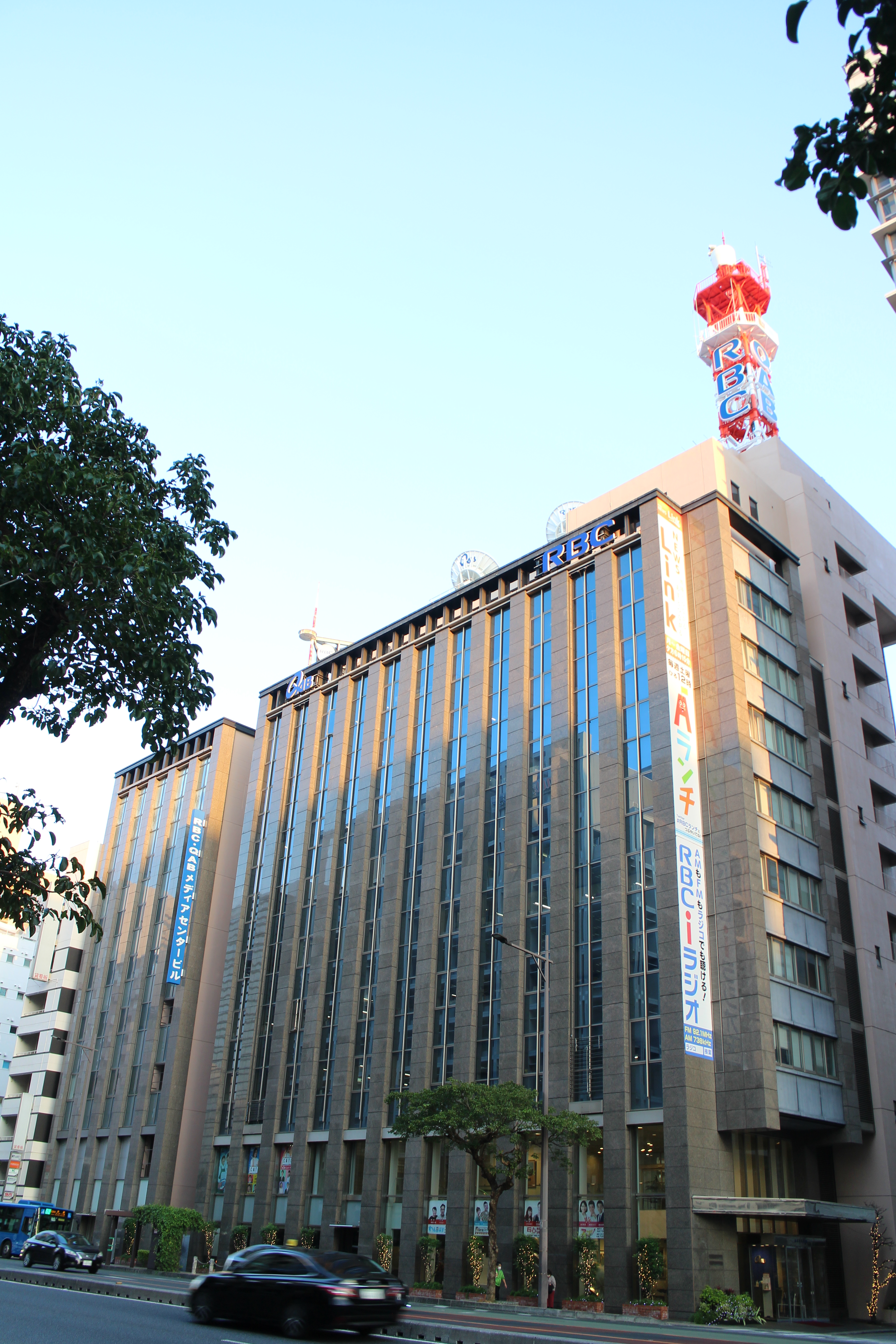
- RBC-QAB Media Center
- Trade name: RBC
- Native name: 琉球放送株式会社
- Romanized name: Ryūkyū Hōsō Kabushiki-gaisha
- Type: Kabushiki gaisha
- Industry: information, communication
- Founded: September 20, 1954
- Headquarters: 2-3-1 Kumoji, Naha City, Okinawa Prefecture, Japan
- Services: Television and radio broadcasting
- Number of employees: 113
- Subsidiaries: RBC Vision Corporation
- Website: www.rbc.co.jp
- Footnotes; Data from its Corporate Profile

JORR
- Naha; Japan
- Broadcast area: Okinawa Prefecture
- Frequencies: 738 kHz; 92.1 MHz
- Branding: RBC iRadio 738; RBC iRadio 92.1

Programming
- Language: Japanese
- Affiliations: Japan Radio Network

Ownership
- Owner: Ryukyu Broadcasting Corporation

History
- Founded: May 16, 1949
- First air date: January 21, 1950
- Former call signs: AKAR (1950–1953); KSAR (1953–1972)
- Call sign meaning: "Ryukyu Radio"

Technical information
- Licensing authority: MIC
- ERP: 10 kW

Links
- Website: www.rbc.co.jp/radio_top/

JORR-DTV
- Okinawa Prefecture; Japan
- City: Naha
- Channels: Digital: 14 (UHF); Virtual: 3
- Branding: RBC Television; RBC

Programming
- Affiliations: Japan News Network

Ownership
- Owner: Ryukyu Broadcasting Corporation

History
- First air date: June 1, 1960
- Former call signs: KSAR-TV (1960–1972); JORR-TV (1972–2011)
- Former channel numbers: Analog: 12 (VHF; 1960–1972); 10 (VHF; 1972–2011) (Note: US channel 12 is the same as Japanese channel 10, so no actual change of frequencies took place when the station came under Japanese regulation.)

Technical information
- Licensing authority: MIC

Links
- Website: www.rbc.co.jp/tv_top/

Ryukyu Broadcasting Corporation (琉球放送株式会社, Ryūkyū Hōsō Kabushiki-gaisha; RBC) is a Japanese regional broadcasting company headquartered in Naha, Okinawa Prefecture. The broadcaster's radio division, RBC iRadio, callsign JORR serves as an affiliate of the Japan Radio Network, while its television division, RBC Television, callsign JORR-DTV (channel 3) serves as an affiliate of the Japan News Network. Both stations serve said prefecture while its studios and headquarters are located in the Kumogi district of Naha which is shared with the headquarters of Ryukyu Asahi Broadcasting, which RBC has a relationship with. The station commenced its radio broadcasts in October 1954 and television broadcasts in June 1960.

RBC's radio division, "RBC iRadio", is one of 4 JRN-only affiliates in the country, and the only one that carries JRN programming as a non-core affiliate. The other 3 JRN-only affiliates are key stations TBS Radio, CBC Radio, and RKB Radio.

== History ==
=== Okinawa under US rule ===
On May 16, 1949, the radio station Voice of Ryukyus was founded by the U.S. military government in the Ryukyu Islands for a trial broadcast under the call sign AKAR, and officially started broadcasting on January 21, 1950, as the first Japanese language broadcast by the U.S. military government to the Ryukyu people, with 75% of the programs broadcast by NHK and 25% by the U.S. Military Government. On February 1, 1953, its call sign changed to KSAR, alongside the increase of the broadcaster's transmitting power. On April 1, 1954, the radio station was handed over to the University of Ryukyu Foundation owing to a shift in the broadcasting industry in the United States, which had an impact on Okinawa as well.

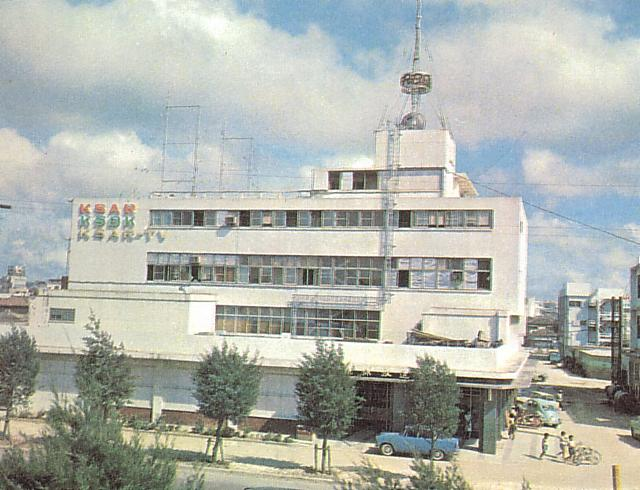
Ryukyu Broadcasting's headquarters in 1964

Due to financial problems of the said university's foundation, Ryukyu Broadcasting was established on September 20, 1954 with a capital of ¥10 million to take over the radio operations of the Voice of Ryukyus, with Okinawa Times being the primary owner. Ryukyu Broadcasting officially started broadcasting on October 1, 1954 with the same call sign (KSAR) from its previous owner. An English version of the existing radio station started broadcasting on September 1 of the following year, with the callsign KSBK, primarily aimed for the US military and their families.On July 30, 1958, the broadcaster began a groundbreaking ceremony of the construction of its second generation headquarters, which was completed on May 20 of the following year, and started operations on June 23 of the same year.

On July 24, 1957, the broadcaster applied for a TV broadcasting license, which was later rejected by the prefectural government. Two years later, on April 9, 1959, they applied again for a TV broadcasting license, which was approved and obtained on December 2 of that year. Prior to their start of TV broadcast, they joined Japan News Network. On June 1, 1960, RBC started broadcasting on TV, being the second commercial TV channel in Okinawa. In 1963, the broadcaster started to expand its broadcast coverage with the opening of its relay transmitter in Kume Island, a first in the prefecture.The following year, the first broadcast link between Japan and Okinawa was established, allowing more programs to be simulcast between the two areas.Ryukyu Broadcasting also composed "RBC Song", which was played since 1964 during sign-on and sign-off on both TV and radio until they went 24/7/365 on April 1, 2022. In 1965, Ryukyu Broadcasting joined JRN, causing both the television and radio stations to join a network from the mainland.

In 1966, Ryukyu Broadcasting expanded its headquarters building and began broadcasting TV programs in the morning. On May 5, 1968, Ryukyu Broadcasting began color broadcasts, and converted its own in-house programs to color in 1971. In 1970, Ryukyu Broadcasting implemented an uninterrupted sign-on to sign-off schedule, ending the daytime break. In the same year, Ryukyu Broadcasting also won the first JNN Special Award for its report on the Okinawa issue.

=== After the reversion ===
In 1972, as the United States returned control of Okinawa to Japan, Ryukyu Broadcasting's call signs also changed. The television call sign was changed from KSAR-TV to JORR-TV, the Japanese radio call sign was changed from KSAR to JORR, and the English radio call sign was changed from KSBK to JORO. On May 15, 1972, the day Okinawa returned to Japan, Ryukyu Broadcasting not only broadcast the transfer of power ceremony, but also assisted TBS in producing a special news program. The following year, Ryukyu Broadcasting Corporation applied to extend the broadcasting license of the English radio station, but was rejected by the Ministry of Posts and Telecommunications. As a consequence, Ryukyu Broadcasting stopped broadcasting the English radio station. In August 1978, Ryukyu Broadcasting Corporation began to build a new broadcasting hall, and completed the first phase of the project in 1980. On December 1 of the same year, television programs began to be broadcast at the New Broadcasting Hall. The following year, with the completion of the second phase of the project, the new broadcasting hall was completed. The building has 11 floors with a total floor area of 6,971 square meters. According to a 1980 survey, Ryukyu Broadcasting's radio division accounted for 40.7% of the Okinawa radio market's listening share, and its television station accounted for 55.2% of its viewing share. Nine of the top 10 programs in Okinawa Prefecture have the highest listening ratings and top 10 ratings - all of which were on RBC.

On January 26, 1981, due to a malfunction at the Tomigusuku broadcasting station, Ryukyu Broadcasting stopped broadcasting its TV signal for more than 3 hours during prime time. In 1984, Ryukyu Broadcasting and the NHK Okinawa Broadcasting Station reached an agreement. Both agreed to use the same cell tower. The following year, Ryukyu Broadcasting began broadcasting stereo TV. In 1987, Ryukyu Broadcasting won the triple crown in ratings. In 1989, Okinawa held the National Private Broadcasting Conference for the first time, and Ryukyu Broadcasting was also one of the organizers. In the same year, Ryukyu Broadcasting was equipped with an SNG truck, making it possible to broadcast live news in areas with inconvenient transportation such as mountains.

In 1993, TV Asahi and Ryukyu Broadcasting reached an agreement. TV Asahi will utilize Ryukyu Broadcasting's talents and equipment to open a new station in Okinawa Prefecture. This model that is very close to "one station and two channels" is also the first new attempt in the Japanese radio and television industry, aiming to minimize costs. In the same year, Ryukyu Broadcasting opened broadcast stations in Miyakojima and Yaeyama Islands, so that the Sakishima Islands could also watch Ryukyu Broadcasting Corporation's TV programs. In order to meet the needs of Ryukyu Asahi Broadcasting, which was jointly established with TV Asahi, Ryukyu Broadcasting expanded the new broadcasting hall in 1994 and completed it in 1995.

From 1999 to 2001, Ryukyu Broadcasting won the ratings championship in prime time and evening time for three consecutive years. In order to welcome the digital TV era, Ryukyu Broadcasting expanded its headquarters again in 2005. On December 1, 2006, Ryukyu Broadcasting began broadcasting its digital station (JORR-DTV) and stopped broadcasting its analog signals on July 24, 2011. In 2013, Ryukyu Broadcasting joined the radiko service, where listeners within Japan are able to listen to Ryukyu Broadcasting Station’s radio programs for free on the Internet.

== Network affiliations ==
=== Radio ===
- Japan Radio Network (JRN)

=== TV ===
- Japan News Network (JNN)
