= Haitai Nanafa =

Japanese anime television series

はいたい七葉
- Genre: Comedy
- Anime television series
- Directed by: Hiroshi Kimura
- Written by: Kenji Konuta
- Studio: Passione
- Original network: QAB
- Original run: October 6, 2012 – June 29, 2013
- Episodes: 26

Haitai Nanafa (はいたい七葉; "Hello Nanafa") is a Japanese anime television series produced by the animation studio Passione. The series' first season aired in Japan between October and December 2012, and a second season aired between April and June 2013.

The series was written by Hiroshi Kimura, and written by Kenji Konuta, with original character design by illustrator POP (ぽっぷ). It originally aired on the local Ryukyu Asahi Broadcasting station in October 2012.

The comedy animated series consists of 26 three-minute episodes and follows Nanafa Kyan, a cheerful middle school girl who helps run the "Kame Soba" with her grandmother, younger sister, and older sister. Their peaceful life begins to change when supernatural spirits are unleashed from a nearby Chinese banyan tree.
