= The Fake Alchemist =

Japanese manga series

- First tankōbon volume cover

ニセモノの錬金術師 (Nisemono no Renkinjutsushi)
- Genre: Fantasy, isekai
- Manga
- Written by: Jirō Sugiura
- Illustrated by: Umemaru
- Published by: Media Factory
- English publisher: NA: Yen Press
- Imprint: MF Comics
- Magazine: KadoComi; Nico Nico Seiga
- Original run: June 3, 2023 – present
- Volumes: 5
- Anime television series
- Directed by: Takeo Takahashi (chief); Hijiri Sanpei
- Written by: Kenta Ihara
- Music by: Luke Standridge
- Studio: Passione

The Fake Alchemist (Japanese: ニセモノの錬金術師, Hepburn: Nisemono no Renkinjutsushi) is a Japanese manga series written by Jirō Sugiura and illustrated by Umemaru. The series is a remake of a webcomic originally written and illustrated by Sugiura on his Pixiv account. It began serialization on Kadokawa Corporation's KadoComi and Nico Nico Seiga websites in June 2023. An anime television series adaptation produced by Passione has been announced.

== Synopsis ==
Paracelsus is a young man who was reincarnated into another world and works as an alchemist. However, unbeknownst to most people, Paracelsus has hidden cheat skills that enable him to make a living as an alchemist. He later goes to a slave trader, to find someone who can keep his secret safe, and later buys two slaves, a human girl named Nora and an amputee elf girl named Coco.

== Characters ==
Paracelsus (パラケルスス, Parakerususu)
Voiced by: Yōhei Matsuoka
Nora Petan (ノラ・ペタン)
Voiced by: Miyari Nemoto

== Media ==
=== Manga ===
Written by Jirō Sugiura and illustrated by Umemaru, The Fake Alchemist is a remake of a webcomic originally written and illustrated by Sugiura on his Pixiv account. It began serialization on Kadokawa Corporation's KadoComi and Nico Nico Seiga websites on June 3, 2023. Its chapters have been compiled into five tankōbon volumes as of February 2026.

In August 2025, Yen Press announced that they had licensed the series for English publication, with the first volume being released in February 2026.

| No. | Original release date | Original ISBN | North American release date | North American ISBN |
|---|---|---|---|---|
| 1 | January 23, 2024 | 978-4-04-682813-2 | February 24, 2026 | 979-8-8554-2102-6 |
| 2 | February 22, 2024 | 978-4-04-683043-2 | June 23, 2026 | 979-8-8554-2104-0 |
| 3 | September 21, 2024 | 978-4-04-683924-4 | March 23, 2027 | 979-8-8554-3931-1 |
| 4 | July 23, 2025 | 978-4-04-684619-8 | — | — |
| 5 | February 20, 2026 | 978-4-04-685613-5 | — | — |
| 6 | December 23, 2026 | 978-4-04-660816-1 | — | — |

=== Anime ===
An anime television series adaptation was announced on June 18, 2026. The series will be produced by Passione and directed by Hijiri Sanpei, with Takeo Takahashi serving as chief director, Kenta Ihara handling series scripts, Yuka Takashina designing the characters, and Luke Standridge composing the music.

== Reception ==
The original webcomic was nominated for the eighth Next Manga Awards in 2022 in the web category, and was ranked twelfth. The series was later nominated for the tenth edition in 2024 in the same category. The series was ranked 15th in the sixth Sanyodo Bookstore Comic Awards in 2025.

== See also ==
- My Wife Has No Emotion, another manga series by Jirō Sugiura
