= It's Just Not My Night =

Japanese manga series

- It's Just Not My Night: Tale of a Fallen Vampire Queen
- First tankōbon volume cover

世が夜なら! (Yo ga Yoru nara!)
- Genre: Comedy, supernatural
- Manga
- Written by: Muchimaro
- Published by: Kodansha
- English publisher: NA: Seven Seas Entertainment
- Magazine: Magazine Pocket
- Original run: June 24, 2020 – October 27, 2021
- Volumes: 3
- icon

It's Just Not My Night: Tale of a Fallen Vampire Queen (Japanese: 世が夜なら!, Hepburn: Yo ga Yoru nara!) is a Japanese manga series written and illustrated by Muchimaro. It was serialized in Kodansha's manga app and website Magazine Pocket from June 2020 to October 2021, with its chapters collected in three tankōbon volumes.

== Story ==
Manamir Bluegarall, a powerful vampire on the verge of conquering the demon realm, is accidentally transported to modern Japan after her subordinates fail a teleportation spell. Stripped of her vampiric powers, she is reduced to near-human weakness and forced to work a low-wage convenience store job to survive. Unaccustomed to human society, she repeatedly becomes entangled in absurd and socially inappropriate situations, including financial mishaps, encounters with criminals, and compromising misunderstandings. Eventually, she reunites with her demon subordinates, whose presence further amplifies the chaos of her life in Tokyo. Despite her arrogance, Manamir remains fiercely protective of her followers as they struggle to adapt to the unfamiliar human world.

== Publication ==
Written and illustrated by Muchimaro, It's Just Not My Night started in Kodansha's manga app and website Magazine Pocket on June 24, 2020, while its first chapter was also published in Weekly Shōnen Magazine. The series finished on October 27, 2021. Kodansha collected its chapters in three tankōbon volumes, released from December 9, 2020, to January 7, 2022.

In North America, the manga has been licensed for English released by Seven Seas Entertainment, who will publish it under their Ghost Ship mature imprint starting on April 5, 2022.

=== Volumes ===
| No. | Original release date | Original ISBN | English release date | English ISBN |
|---|---|---|---|---|
| 1 | December 9, 2020 | 978-4-06-521683-5 | May 10, 2022 | 978-1-63858-404-9 |
| 2 | May 7, 2021 | 978-4-06-523155-5 | November 1, 2022 | 978-1-63858-678-4 |
| 3 | January 7, 2022 | 978-4-06-526308-2 | March 21, 2023 | 978-1-68579-466-8 |

== See also ==
- Even the Student Council Has Its Holes!, another manga series by the same author
