= KSBK (AM) =

Former radio station in Naha, Okinawa (1950–1973)

- Naha, Ryukyu Islands; United States
- Frequency: 880 kHz

Programming
- Format: Top 40

Ownership
- Owner: University of the Ryukyus Foundation
- Operator: Ryukyu Broadcasting Corporation
- Sister stations: KSAR/JORR

History
- First air date: September 1, 1955
- Last air date: October 31, 1973
- Former call signs: JORO (1972–1973)

Technical information
- Licensing authority: FCC (1955-1972); MPT (1972-1973)
- Power: 500 watts

KSBK (880 AM) was a radio station in Naha, Okinawa, operated by the Ryukyu Broadcasting Corporation (RBC). At its closure, it was the only non-military English-language radio station in Japan; among the disc jockeys who worked at the station were Robert Colbert and Art Bell. KSBK, which became JORO when the Ryukyu Islands reverted to Japan in 1972, operated from September 1, 1955, to October 31, 1973, being closed as a result of government skepticism over the continued need for a commercial English-language station and the application of Japanese broadcasting regulation, which did not permit duopolies.

== History ==
KSBK began broadcasting on September 1, 1955. At the time, it signed on as the first non-military English-language radio station in Japan; the only English-language radio stations were part of the military Far East Network (FEN) of the U.S. Armed Forces Network (AFN). It was co-owned with a Japanese-language station, KSAR, which had been established in 1950 as AKAR under the auspices of the United States Civil Administration of the Ryukyu Islands, relaunched in 1953, and transferred to the University of the Ryukyus Foundation in 1954, being then leased to the RBC. The 500-watt transmitter used to start KSBK was purchased initially for a planned relay of KSAR, which was not needed due to better than anticipated coverage. Programs on KSBK catered to the large United States military and civilian support population on the island. KSBK also carried radio simulcasts of selected shows from the NTA Film Network, in English, while its TV counterpart carried the Japanese audio. Among the NTA programs broadcast in this way were Divorce Court, George Jessel's Show Business, and The Sheriff of Cochise.

According to anthropologist James E. Roberson, KSBK was the most influential station on Okinawa from the late 1950s and continuing through the 1960s. It was characterized by an independent stance toward the military, strong support from local businesses representing as much as 70 percent of advertising sales, and its employment of young American DJs like Art Bell and Robert Colbert playing the latest American pop music. Colbert worked at the station until a woman in the Air Force heard his voice and recommended he try out for a play, starting his acting career. A young Art Bell was part of the new station for six years as a disc jockey; while there, he would set a Guinness World Record at the station for staying on the air continuously for 115 hours and 15 minutes. He left and returned to the U.S. mainland after the Japanese woman he married suffered from increasing mental illness.

In 1971, the RBC, which owned KSAR and KSBK, protested the opening of a new talk-formatted AFN radio station on 1420 kHz and unsuccessfully demanded that the existing music station on 650 kHz, which now had more time to air musical programming, avoid any format overlap with its English-language outlet.

The call letters of KSAR and KSBK were changed to JORR and JORO in 1972 when the islands were returned to Japanese governance; at that time, the call signs of all of the stations on the island were changed, and new transmitters were added for the NHK networks. However, while Japanese-language JORR would remain on the air, the end of American administration of the Ryukyu Islands and their reversion to Japan prompted the Ministry of Posts and Telecommunications to question the continued need for an English-language broadcast station there, resulting in its refusal to renew the license; the decision was also necessitated by Japanese broadcasting law, which did not permit one commercial concern to own multiple AM radio stations in the same area.

As a result, JORO closed for the final time on October 31, 1973, a "de facto victim" of reversion. The final day was dominated by many residents calling into the station, "like people calling in condolences at a wake".

== See also ==
- List of radio stations in Japan, extant Japanese radio stations
- American Forces Network, U.S. military TV and radio network
- MegaNet, Japanese multilingual commercial radio network
