= Retracement (finance) =

Retracement in finance is a complete or partial reversal of the price of a security or a derivative from its current trend, thereby creating a temporary counter-trend. Not to be confused with Fibonacci Retracement, market correction and/or market reversal, which are the most popular types of retracements.
