= Dokagui Daisuki! Mochizuki-san =

Japanese manga series

- First tankōbon volume cover

ドカ食いダイスキ！ もちづきさん
- Genre: Comedy; Gourmet
- Manga
- Written by: Kamome Maruyono
- Published by: Hakusensha
- Imprint: Young Animal Comics
- Magazine: Young Animal Zero; Young Animal Web
- Original run: May 9, 2024 – present
- Volumes: 4
- Anime television series
- Studio: Passione
- icon

Dokagui Daisuki! Mochizuki-san (ドカ食いダイスキ！ もちづきさん) is a Japanese manga series written and illustrated by Kamome Maruyono. It began serialization in Hakusensha's seinen manga magazine Young Animal Zero and Young Animal Web manga website in May 2024. An anime television series adaptation produced by Passione has been announced.

== Synopsis ==
The series is centered around Mikoto Mochizuki, a woman who is an avid binge eater.

== Media ==
=== Manga ===
Written and illustrated by Kamome Maruyono, Dokagui Daisuki! Mochizuki-san began serialization on Hakusensha's seinen manga magazine Young Animal Zero and Young Animal Web manga website on May 9, 2024. Its chapters have been compiled into four tankōbon volumes as of September 2026.

No.	Release date	ISBN
1	October 29, 2024	978-4-592-16031-1
2	April 28, 2025	978-4-592-16032-8
3	November 28, 2025	978-4-592-16033-5
4	September 29, 2026	978-4-592-16060-1

=== Anime ===
An anime television series adaptation produced by Passione was announced on August 4, 2026.

== Reception ==
The series was nominated for the tenth Next Manga Awards in 2024 in the web category. It was ranked 8th and also won the Nichirei Prize. It was also ranked sixth in the eleventh edition in 2025 in the same category. The series was ranked 16th in "Top 100 Internet Buzzwords" of 2024. The series was nominated for the 18th Manga Taishō. The series was ranked third in the manga category in the 2025 EbookJapan Manga Awards. The series won the Grand Prize in the sixth Sanyodo Bookstore Comic Awards in 2025. The series was ranked ninth in the 2026 edition of Takarajimasha's Kono Manga ga Sugoi! guidebook's list of the best manga for male readers.
