= Even the Student Council Has Its Holes! =

Japanese manga series

- First tankōbon volume cover, featuring Hisako Kotobuki

生徒会にも穴はある! (Seitokai ni mo Ana wa Aru!)
- Genre: Comedy; Slice of life
- Manga
- Written by: Muchimaro
- Published by: Kodansha
- English publisher: NA: Seven Seas Entertainment
- Imprint: Shōnen Magazine Comics
- Magazine: Weekly Shōnen Magazine
- Original run: April 27, 2022 – present
- Volumes: 13
- Anime television series
- Directed by: Naoyuki Tatsuwa
- Written by: Masahiro Yokotani
- Music by: Tomoki Kikuya
- Studio: Passione
- Licensed by: NA: Aniplex of America
- Original network: Tokyo MX, BS11, GTV, GYT (censored); AT-X (uncensored)
- Original run: October 4, 2026 – present
- Episodes: 8
- icon

Even the Student Council Has Its Holes! (Note: Also known as There Is Also a Hole in the Student Organization!) (Japanese: 生徒会にも穴はある!, Hepburn: Seitokai ni mo Ana wa Aru!) is a Japanese yonkoma manga series written and illustrated by Muchimaro. It has been serialized in Kodansha's shōnen manga magazine Weekly Shōnen Magazine since April 2022. An anime television series adaptation produced by Passione premiered in October 2026.

== Plot ==
In prestigious Fujinasu Academy, a private high school on the outskirts of town, Ume Mizunoe, a young literary enthusiast, agrees to join the student council in order to avoid having to repeat a year. However, the members of the student council happen to be a very strange bunch of individuals.

== Characters ==
Ume Mizunoe (水之江 梅, Mizunoe Ume)
Voiced by: Shogo Sakata (Japanese); Alan Lee (English)
A first-year high school student who excels in humanities but struggles in math and science. He joins the student council as its secretary at the recommendation of his homeroom teacher so that he would not have to repeat a year. He is also a member of the Handicrafts Club. Throughout his time on the student council, he develops a crush on Hisako, but he never finds the right moment to confess his feelings to her. This leads to misunderstandings between the two of them.
Hisako Kotobuki (古都吹 寿子, Kotobuki Hisako)
Voiced by: Haruka Shiraishi (Japanese); Courtney Lin (English)
A third-year student and the student council's president. She excels in academics and sports and wears a ponytail. Although she looks mature and well-mannered, she gets flustered easily when she hears sex-related topics. She and Ume have mutual feelings of each other, but their interactions always turns into comedic situations. She has a younger sister and a younger brother, the latter of whom is jealous of her close relationship with Ume.
Komaro Michinoku (陸奥 こまろ, Michinoku Komaro)
Voiced by: Miyu Tomita (Japanese); Xanthe Huynh (English)
A first-year student and the student council's general affairs officer. She possesses a small appearance and a large-chested frame. She has a naive and sincere personality, but is also hapless and accident-prone. She currently lives alone, as her parents were killed in a plane crash when she was young. She excels in mathematics.
Arisu Terui (照井 有栖, Terui Arisu)
Voiced by: Shizuka Ishigami (Japanese); Stephanie Wong (English)
A second-year student and the student council's treasurer. She comes from a wealthy family and hides a violent, sadistic side beneath her polite, soft-spoken persona, which becomes apparent whenever she abuses Tan and when the Robotics Club causes trouble. She was previously a delinquent in junior high school, and is still now feared by students and staff alike. She is self-conscious about her smaller chest compared to Hisako's and Komaro's. She is also a member of the Chemistry Club.
Tan Otori (尾鳥 たん, Otori Tan)
Voiced by: Hiyori Kono (Japanese); Alex Cazares (English)
A third-year middle school student who serves as the student council's public relations officer. He is lively but narcissistic and perverted, where he enjoys making suggestive remarks to the other male students and council members, especially Ume. He has a feminine appearance, which he uses to his advantage to seduce other boys, later moments hint at his growing feelings for Arisu. He excels in information technology and physics. He usually provokes Arisu's violent tendencies and is often beaten up by her.
Satomi Hiratsuka (平塚 敏深, Hiratsuka Satomi)
Voiced by: Yumi Uchiyama (Japanese); Anne Yatco (English)
The homeroom teacher of Ume and Komaro, and the student council's adviser. Although she has a carefree, rude and lazy personality, she is always thoughtful of her students.
Mayuki Kotobuki (古都吹 真幸, Kotobuki Mayuki)
Voiced by: Yoko Hikasa
Hisako's mother. She possesses the mental energy and vitality of a friend to her daughter. Her family runs a restaurant.

== Media ==
=== Manga ===
Written and illustrated by Muchimaro, Seitokai ni mo Ana wa Aru! started in Kodansha's shōnen manga magazine Weekly Shōnen Magazine on April 27, 2022. Kodansha has collected its chapters into individual tankōbon volumes. The first volume was released on September 16, 2022. As of August 17, 2026, thirteen volumes have been released.

A promotional video for the seventh volume, animated by Passione, was uploaded to the series' official X account on July 10, 2024.

In January 2026, Seven Seas Entertainment announced that it had licensed the series for English publication, through its Ghost Ship imprint, with the first volume released in September of the same year.

==== Volumes ====
No.	Original release date	Original ISBN	English release date	English ISBN
1	September 16, 2022	978-4-06-529086-6	September 8, 2026	979-8-89863-067-6
2	December 16, 2022	978-4-06-529991-3	December 8, 2026	979-8-89863-068-3
3	April 17, 2023	978-4-06-531235-3	March 9, 2027	979-8-89863-069-0
4	August 17, 2023	978-4-06-532610-7	—	—
5	November 16, 2023	978-4-06-533514-7	—	—
6	March 15, 2024	978-4-06-534862-8	—	—
7	July 17, 2024	978-4-06-536135-1	—	—
8	November 15, 2024	978-4-06-537043-8	—	—
9	March 17, 2025	978-4-06-538704-7	—	—
10	July 16, 2025	978-4-06-540003-6	—	—
11	November 17, 2025	978-4-06-541574-0	—	—
12	March 17, 2026	978-4-06-543075-0	—	—
13	August 17, 2026	978-4-06-544344-6	—	—

=== Anime ===
In April 2025, it was announced that the manga would receive an anime television series adaptation. The series is produced by Passione and directed by Naoyuki Tatsuwa, with scripts by Masahiro Yokotani, character designs by Ryo Imamura, and music by Tomoki Kikuya. It premiered on October 4, 2026, on Tokyo MX and other channels. (Note: Tokyo MX lists the series premiere as 24:30 on October 3, 2026, which is effectively October 4 at 12:30 a.m. JST.) The series is also streaming simultaneously on D Anime Store and AnimeFesta, with both a censored version and an uncensored ("unrestricted") version; the uncensored version premiered on AT-X on October 6. The opening theme song is "Run, Anyway." (風の中は走るっきゃないっ！, Kaze no Naka wa Hashirukkyanai), performed by Sangatsu no Phantasia, while the ending theme song is "Pit" (ぴ, Pi), performed by Akari Nanawo.

The series has been licensed in North America by Aniplex of America and is simulcast on OceanVeil. An English dub of both the censored and uncensored versions premiered on OceanVeil on October 31, 2026.

==== Episodes ====
No.	Title	Directed by	Written by	Storyboarded by	Original release date
1	"Even High School Boys Have Their Holes..."; Transliteration: "Osugaki ni mo Ana wa Arunda Yona..." (Japanese: オスガキにも穴はあるんだよな…)	Naoyuki Tatsuwa	Masahiro Yokotani	Naoyuki Tatsuwa	October 4, 2026
1	"Ume Takes Responsibility"; Transliteration: "Kaichō wa Ume-kun ni Morawaremashita" (Japanese: かいちょーは梅くんに貰われました)	Naoyuki Tatsuwa	Masahiro Yokotani	Naoyuki Tatsuwa	October 4, 2026
Studious student Ume Mizunoe is recommended by his homeroom teacher Satomi Hiratsuka to join the student council in order to avoid repeating a year. Ume is aghast to learn that the student council consists of the demure but crass Arisu Terui, mischievous and effeminate Tan Otori, and closeted pervert Hisako Kotobuki. Ume begins his work in helping the student council, ranging from allotting the school clubs' budgets to inspecting for violations and confiscating prohibited goods, while becoming overwhelmed by their eccentricities. The student council later leads the school assembly at Satomi's suggestion, where Ume sees his colleagues serving their roles well. Hisako concludes the assembly by inexplicably sharing a video of rabbits mating on the laptop, forcing Ume to intervene by closing the laptop between Hisako's breasts to their embarrassment.
2	"Savior Tan"; Transliteration: "Meshia Tan" (Japanese: メシアたん)	Naoyuki Tatsuwa & Takahiro Majima	Masahiro Yokotani	Naoyuki Tatsuwa	October 11, 2026
2	"The Seven Mysteries of the Academy and the Council’s Night Patrol"; Transliteration: "Nanafushigi to Yoru no Oshigoto" (Japanese: 七不思議と夜のお仕事)	Naoyuki Tatsuwa & Takahiro Majima	Masahiro Yokotani	Naoyuki Tatsuwa	October 11, 2026
2	"Komaro Is Here!"; Transliteration: "Komaro Arawareru!!" (Japanese: こまろ現る！！)	Naoyuki Tatsuwa & Takahiro Majima	Masahiro Yokotani	Naoyuki Tatsuwa	October 11, 2026
The student council goes around school placing new posters. Ume and Arisu then help Hisako produce a detailed brochure for the Swimming Club, though they struggle to finish it. Tan arrives to accomplish the brochure in time but suggests on also selling prints of the Swimming Club girls in revealing swimsuits, leading Arisu to severely punish him. Later on, the student council handles night patrol duties, where Hisako wishes for Ume to rely on her more. Ume and Arisu become frightened by the school's horror stories and Tan's unintentional hijinks. Komaro Michinoku returns to the student council after recovering from an injury. She quickly forms a friendship with Ume, learning they are classmates. Tan is disheartened that Ume and Arisu both regard Komaro as the cuter one compared to him. Hisako, who has a crush on Ume, becomes jealous of his closeness to Komaro and tearfully regards they are a match, leaving Ume confused as Arisu comforts both Tan and Hisako.
3	"Pool Cleaning and the Swimsuit Episode"; Transliteration: "Pūru Sōji de Mizugi Kai" (Japanese: プール掃除で水着回)	Naoyuki Tatsuwa	Masahiro Yokotani	Takeo Takahashi	October 18, 2026
3	"I'm Happy for You"; Transliteration: "Yokattana" (Japanese: よかったな)	Naoyuki Tatsuwa	Masahiro Yokotani	Takeo Takahashi	October 18, 2026
The student council helps the Swimming Club clean the outdoor pool, where Ume sees Komaro being easily prone to accidents. They then rein in an out-of-control hose caused by Tan's carelessness that leaves Hisako and Arisu drenched in water, leaving Arisu to punish him again. Tan grows sick, so Ume visits him to tend to his health and learns of his difficult family situation. Ume administers suppositories to Tan to aid his cold, but finds to his horror that he inserted a breath mint instead, forcing Ume to redo the process. Later on, Hisako offers to help Ume on his math and science studies, though Hisako becomes jealous at the rest of the student council providing their assistance. Ume returns home to find his older sister Sho, who has a brother complex, back from an overseas trip. Arisu and Komaro also visit him, during which Sho boasts on knowing more about Ume's sensitive details. Arisu and Komaro playfully butt heads with Sho, much to Ume's chagrin. Despite her teasing, Sho voices gratefulness at Ume socializing more, flustering him.
4	"Komaro and her Suggestion Box"; Transliteration: "Komaro to Meyasu-bako" (Japanese: こまろと目安箱)	Naoyuki Tatsuwa & Takashi Ikehata	Masahiro Yokotani	Ikuo Morimoto & Masae Nakayama	October 25, 2026
4	"Terui-senpai's Secret"; Transliteration: "Terui-senpai no Himitsu ♪" (Japanese: 照井先輩の秘密♪)	Naoyuki Tatsuwa & Takashi Ikehata	Masahiro Yokotani	Ikuo Morimoto & Masae Nakayama	October 25, 2026
4	"Koki-chan and the Light Music Club"; Transliteration: "Kōki-chan to Keion-bu" (Japanese: こうきちゃんと軽音部)	Naoyuki Tatsuwa & Takashi Ikehata	Masahiro Yokotani	Ikuo Morimoto & Masae Nakayama	October 25, 2026
4	"Rendezvous in the Gym Storage Room!!"; Transliteration: "Taīku Sōko de Randebū!!" (Japanese: 体育倉庫でランデブー！！)	Naoyuki Tatsuwa & Takashi Ikehata	Masahiro Yokotani	Ikuo Morimoto & Masae Nakayama	October 25, 2026
The student council promotes their suggestion box through demanding the Baseball Club's assistance as punishment for hitting Komaro. Hisako then treats them for lunch at the cafeteria, and they quietly observe Arisu enjoying a strange meal by herself. Later on, Ume receives complaints of sensual noises coming from the Light Music Club. Ume investigates to find club member Koki playing music. Koki and her clubmates assert there is no commotion and allow Ume to visit them, even as he finds evidence that point towards sexual activities being a factor. Ume and Komaro complete an errand in the gym storage room but lock themselves inside. When Komaro voices her urgent need to head to the restroom, Ume and Tan, who also locked himself following a failed rescue, help her escape through an open window, though their actions are misinterpreted as sexual intercourse. Satomi and the student council agree to have a hot springs retreat before teasing them to not commit any suggestive acts.
5	"The Student Council's Bonding Retreat!!"; Transliteration: "Seitokai Gasshuku!!" (Japanese: 生徒会合宿！！)	Naoyuki Tatsuwa, Takashi Ikehata & Takahiro Majima	Masahiro Yokotani	Masae Nakayama & Takeo Takahashi	November 1, 2026
5	"Operation Ume Tan-tan!!"; Transliteration: "Ūme Tantan dai Sakusen!!" (Japanese: うーめたんたん大作戦！！)	Naoyuki Tatsuwa, Takashi Ikehata & Takahiro Majima	Masahiro Yokotani	Masae Nakayama & Takeo Takahashi	November 1, 2026
5	"Ume Shares His Umbrella"; Transliteration: "Kasa de Kasanaru Ame to Ume" (Japanese: かさでかさなるあめとうめ)	Naoyuki Tatsuwa, Takashi Ikehata & Takahiro Majima	Masahiro Yokotani	Masae Nakayama & Takeo Takahashi	November 1, 2026
The student council and Satomi, who joined late, arrive at the hot springs after a chaotic drive and relax. Tan teases Ume for mistaking him as a girl but becomes demoralized at seeing Ume's penis. Satomi, Komaro, Tan, and Arisu quickly fall asleep in the men's bedroom, so Ume and Hisako decide to sleep together in the women's bedroom. Hisako apologizes for making Ume take on more work, though Ume assures her he is enjoying it. The group later returns to school, where Ume asks Tan about Arisu's mysterious character. Tan slyly suggests they spy on Arisu to find blackmail material. They see Arisu sing a childish and endearing lullaby about the student council, leaving Tan jubilant. However, he and Ume expose themselves, and Arisu brutally punishes Tan. During a rainy day, Ume shares his umbrella with Hisako until they face difficulty with its unconventional design. Ume visits the Handicrafts Club, only to find that the Robotics Club have taken over the clubroom. Ume mediates both clubs in reaching a compromise following Arisu's threats towards the Robotics Club.
6	"Lost in the Moment"; Transliteration: "Yacchatta" (Japanese: やっちゃった)	Naoyuki Tatsuwa & Takahiro Majima	Masahiro Yokotani	Takeo Takahashi & Ikuo Morimoto	November 8, 2026
6	"Ume and Hiratsuka-sensei"; Transliteration: "Ume to Sensei" (Japanese: 梅と先生)	Naoyuki Tatsuwa & Takahiro Majima	Masahiro Yokotani	Takeo Takahashi & Ikuo Morimoto	November 8, 2026
6	"A Day in Komaro's Life"; Transliteration: "Komaro no Sekai" (Japanese: こまろの世界)	Naoyuki Tatsuwa & Takahiro Majima	Masahiro Yokotani	Takeo Takahashi & Ikuo Morimoto	November 8, 2026
While conducting student council duties, the girls excuse themselves to the restroom but uncover its faulty amenities. Hisako volunteers to escape through the restroom's narrow window to help Arisu and Komaro, only to become stuck and expose her panties to Ume and Tan. Hisako becomes bothered by the thought of Ume seeing her panties while studying at home and conducts an experiment that devolves into masturbation, much to her embarrassment. After dealing with a beehive on campus, the student council reports their activities to Satomi, who later requests Ume to prepare dinner at her apartment. Ume bashfully admits to Satomi on enjoying his time in the student council and liking each of its members, while finding out that she lets Komaro stay in her home as her guardian. Satomi also points out that Komaro is more cheerful thanks to Ume, while Komaro teasingly states her reasoning is a secret. A montage is later shown of Komaro formerly spending time at school alone following her parents' deaths, as her mood and disposition significantly improve through meeting Ume, whom she sees as a valuable person in her life.
7	"Komaro's Challenge"; Transliteration: "Komaro no Chōsen" (Japanese: こまろの挑戦)	Naoyuki Tatsuwa	Masahiro Yokotani	Takeo Takahashi	November 15, 2026
Komaro proposes on selling her onigiri as an alternative to the cafeteria's rising prices. The student council warms up to her idea, with Hisako inviting them to her home to cook batches of onigiri. Hisako's mother Mayuki learns of the arrangement and enthusiastically helps them while believing that Hisako is dating Ume, much to Hisako's consternation. Seeing this, Arisu decides to play along in painting Hisako and Ume as a couple, enthralling Mayuki. Ume and Arisu later submit their proposal for approval, but they are denied by administrator Yoshino Saegusa despite complying with school rules, saddening Komaro. Arisu, with the help of Ume and Tan, blackmail Yoshino by threatening to expose her embezzlement of the cafeteria's funds, disparaging remarks towards her fellow teachers, and sexual frustrations in school, causing a mortified Yoshino to comply to their demands and become subservient. Komaro's onigiri becomes a hit with the students, leaving the student council glad at fulfilling Komaro's proposal.
8	"A Day in Satomi's Life"; Transliteration: "Satomi no Sekai" (Japanese: さとみの世界)	Hitomi Ezoe	Masahiro Yokotani	Takashi Sano & Ikuo Morimoto	November 22, 2026
8	"Cleanup Duty and Boobs"; Transliteration: "Osōji to Oppai" (Japanese: おそうじとおっぱい)	Hitomi Ezoe	Masahiro Yokotani	Takashi Sano & Ikuo Morimoto	November 22, 2026
8	"Get Well Soon!"; Transliteration: "Itai no Itai no Tondeike!" (Japanese: 痛いの痛いのとんでいけ！)	Hitomi Ezoe	Masahiro Yokotani	Takashi Sano & Ikuo Morimoto	November 22, 2026
8	"Ume's Playboy Allegations"; Transliteration: "Ume no Chara Otoko Giwaku" (Japanese: 梅のチャラ男疑惑)	Hitomi Ezoe	Masahiro Yokotani	Takashi Sano & Ikuo Morimoto	November 22, 2026
8	"Tan's Scheme"; Transliteration: "Tan no Takurami" (Japanese: たんのたくらみ)	Hitomi Ezoe	Masahiro Yokotani	Takashi Sano & Ikuo Morimoto	November 22, 2026
8	"Cold Alone, Warm Together"; Transliteration: "Minna de Tsudoeba" (Japanese: みんなで集えば)	Hitomi Ezoe	Masahiro Yokotani	Takashi Sano & Ikuo Morimoto	November 22, 2026
Satomi navigates her daily life of grading her students despite living a life of carelessness and squalor. She has the student council clean the school grounds when she suffers from back pain, and Ume later gives her a piggyback ride to Hisako's jealousy. Sometime after the cleaning, Hisako brings Ume to the infirmary upon noticing his fever and has him recover. She prepares to leave until she sees something shake within Ume's groin, so she tries to retrieve it. Tan visits them and interprets her gesture as a handjob, prompting him to mischievously take a picture. Hisako's brother Taiga encounters Ume with Komaro and Tan while out on a shopping trip, and he accuses him of being a serial cheater. Taiga also exposes Hisako's private tendencies and accidentally undresses Tan, causing a stir. Back in school, Ume and Arisu observe Tan selling his own photoset at exorbitant prices and using its funds to buy gloves for the student council, though Arisu is insulted by Tan buying a sports bra for her flat chest. The student council gathers at their room during a cold winter day, with everyone huddling for warmth.

== Reception ==
By September 2026, the manga had over 2.7 million copies in circulation. The series won the ninth Next Manga Award in the print category in 2023.

== See also ==
- It's Just Not My Night, another manga series by the same author
