= Nansei Broadcasting =

Former TV company in Okinawa

Nansei Broadcasting (Japanese: 南西放送株式会社, Nansei Hōsō Kabushiki-gaisha) was established in July 1989 with the goal of operating a broadcasting business targeting Okinawa Prefecture and setting up an affiliate of Nippon Television (NNN/NNS) in the prefecture.

Ten influential local companies—Ryukyu Bank, Okinawa Bank, Okinawa Kaiho Bank, Okinawa Electric Power, Ryukyu Oil (now Ryuseki), Kanehide Headquarters, Okinawa Prefectural Agricultural Cooperative Central Association (now JA Okinawa), Ryukyu Bus (now Ryukyu Bus Transportation), Okinawa Sugar Manufacturing, and Shiroishi—invested in the company, along with Fuji Television (formerly Fuji Media Holdings) and others. Ultimately, the plan wasn't achieved, and the station never launched. Ryukyu Asahi Broadcasting went on the become the third television station in the prefecture, signing on in 1995; NTV has a bureau in Naha and Okinawa Television carries some of the network's programs.

== Overview ==
Currently, there are four commercial television networks in Japan, excluding TV Tokyo (TXN), which operates as a metropolitan commercial network. Initially, in Okinawa Prefecture, which had only two commercial stations on the VHF band, there was an aim to establish two UHF stations independently or simultaneously in the first half of the 1990s (spring 1993).

In 1980, local businessmen requested the allocation of a new television frequency for Okinawa. For this end, they formed Nansei Broadcasting in 1989.

Nippon Television and TV Asahi were already interested in starting a station in Okinawa on the UHF band in 1991. TV Asahi announced that it would "disconsider profitability" and establish a networked station, and was competing with NTV for the third or fourth station, like what happened in Ishikawa (KTK-HAB), Kumamoto (KAB) and Nagasaki (NCC-NIB). It was evaluated that a new TV station would have an operating cost of two billion yen, the cost included the renting of three floors of a building in Kumoji as well as a transmitting antenna. Ultimately, the total cost would be paid by the newspaper groups that operate the networks. TV Asahi would continue using its office in Okinawa for the time being, for the gathering of news items.

The plan for the third and fourth television station was almost subject to approval by the government in February 1992. Nansei Broadcasting's financial weight increased, owing largely to its local partners. The timeline was as follows: licenses given during fiscal 1992, solicited during fiscal 1993, preliminary licenses by summer that year, both new stations would begin simultaneously in spring 1994. NTV and TV Asahi saw Okinawa as a priority, in line with the regulator's plan for four commercial television stations in every prefecture by 1994.

However, Ryukyu Asahi Broadcasting (QAB), an affiliate of TV Asahi (ANN), eventually began operations in the fall of 1995, leading to the failure of the simultaneous opening of the two stations. Furthermore, due to the freezing of NTV's plan to expand into Okinawa, the initiative was put on hold, and the application for a broadcasting license was withdrawn. Subsequently, Nansei Broadcasting went bankrupt.
