= NHK Okinawa Broadcasting Station =

Public broadcaster in Okinawa, Japan

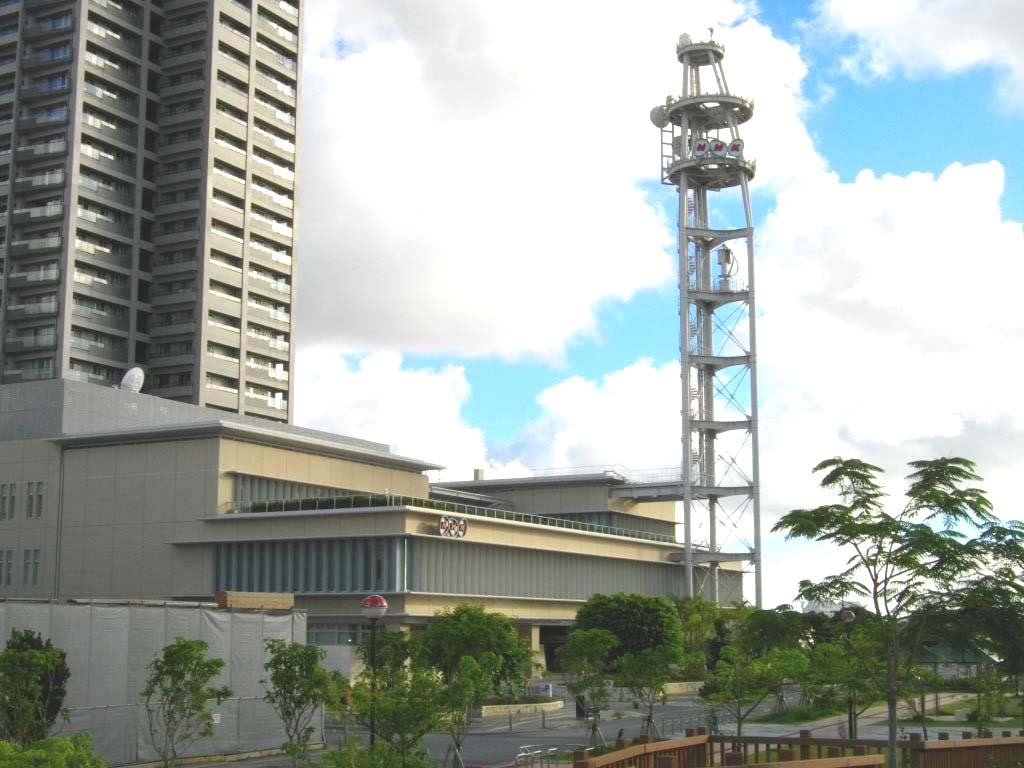
Head office

The NHK Okinawa Broadcasting Station (NHK沖縄放送局, NHK Okinawa Hōsō Kyoku) is a unit of the NHK that oversees terrestrial broadcasting in Okinawa Prefecture.

== History ==
=== Second World War ===
The station in Shuri City (currently Shuri Samukawa-cho, Naha City) began operation on March 19, 1942, during the Pacific War, transmitting wired broadcasting around Naha. In March 1945, station equipment was damaged in air raids just before the Battle of Okinawa. The station ceased operation and broadcasts were temporarily discontinued.

=== OHK (American occupation) ===
In October 1961, the NHK established a communication station in Naha. It was the first time in 16 and a half years that the NHK had established a base in Okinawa, which was under US military administration at the time. The station was treated as a general overseas branch office until the 1971 Okinawa Reversion Agreement.

In September 1964, the microwave line between Okinawa and Mainland Japan was opened, providing programs to OTV and RBC. Subsequently, the NHK replaced the Naha communication station with a general station for Okinawa.

Following planning in Okinawa and Sakishima from 1965, the Ryukyu government enacted the Regulations for Establishing the Broadcasting System Investigation Council (1966 Regulation No. 153). The Law Concerning Transfer of Equipment Necessary for Television Broadcasting in Miyako Islands and Yaeyama Islands (Law No. 24 of 1967) was promulgated and enforced in July 1967. The Broadcasting Law (No. 122) was passed by the government and promulgated in September.

The Okinawa Broadcasting Corporation (沖縄放送協会, Okinawa Hoso Kyokai or OHK) was established on October 2, 1967. Television broadcasts began on December 22, 1968 under the callsign KSGB-TV, broadcasting on VHF channel 2 in the Japanese standard. On January 1, 1969, OHK began to charge a viewing fee of 80 cents per month. On April 12, 1969, the OHK broadcasting center and broadcasting hall were completed, and officially opened on October 1 of the same year with the addition of an NHK program recording center. Two additional relay stations, OHK Nakijin, and OHK Kumejima, opened in 1969 and 1971.

The frequencies used during the American occupation era were as follows::

- Naha (main): channel 2 Japan standard (KSGB-TV)
- Nakijin: channel 38 Japan standard
- Kumejima: channel 10 Japan standard (In 1995, the frequency was changed to channel 36 to mitigate sporadic E propagation interference.)
- Miyakojima: channel 9 USA standard (KSDY-TV)
- Ishigaki (Yaeyama): channel 11 USA standard (KSGA-TV), later moved to 9 in the Japanese standard
- Ishigaki (Kabira): channel 13 USA standard, later moved to 11 in the Japanese standard
- Taketomi: channel 10 USA standard, later moved to 8 in the Japanese standard
- Yonaguni: channel 12 USA standard, later moved to 10 in the Japanese standard and 37 in 1998

The stations were granted Japanese frequencies in anticipation of the return of Japanese control over the islands.

=== After the reversion ===
Following the reversion agreement through which Japan regained sovereignty over Okinawa Prefecture, OHK was merged with the NHK Okinawa General Bureau and reorganized into the NHK Okinawa Broadcasting Station and the NHK Miyako Broadcasting Station. Following the implementation of Japan's Broadcasting Law, the television frequencies and call signs of each broadcasting station were changed.[3] OHK Television was renamed NHK Okinawa (General) Television, with the call sign JOAP-TV for the Tomigusuku Station on the main island. NHK Educational Television, with the call sign JOAD-TV, also began broadcasting on the main island. In the Sakishima area, the Yaeyama station was integrated into the Miyako station, which continued to broadcast only General TV under the call sign JOVQ-TV. Programming consisted of content from both networks, although some programs were delayed. Grand Sumo wrestling and high school baseball were delayed by one day, while New Year's Eve's Kohaku Uta Gassen was broadcast on New Year's Day. News was broadcast with a blue background and locally produced subtitles accompanying the radio news audio.

On June 25, the JOAP radio station which had operated prior to 1945 resumed broadcasting, along with Radio 2 station JOAD. Relay stations were established on Miyakojima and Ishigakijima, broadcasting simultaneously with the main island. The NHK FM station began broadcasting on June 24, 1974, under the call sign JOAP-FM. Due to the broadcasting conditions at the time, the station initially broadcast in monaural audio.[4] Following the provisional opening of the submarine cable, television news in the Miyako and Yaeyama areas began broadcasting simultaneously with the main island of Okinawa and mainland Japan, although the broadcasts were in black and white.[5]

Stereo television broadcasts began on February 23, 1986, for General TV and on March 21, 1991, for Educational TV.

The relocation to a new broadcasting hall in Omoromachi, Naha City, was completed on March 6, 2006. The sales department, which had previously been located in Naha City, was also relocated to the new building after its completion. Digital terrestrial broadcasting began on April 1, 2006, for both stations, including 1seg. Until October 1, the 1seg signal relayed the NHK station in Fukuoka. Following the start of 1seg broadcasting by the Kitakyushu station, the signal was switched to the Okinawa broadcast.

Beginning in April 2018, local news and weather information on weekends and holidays, including the year-end and New Year's holidays, was generally incorporated into the Kyushu-Okinawa news block from Fukuoka for both television and radio. Exceptions were made for elections and disasters. Local news and weather information from Okinawa was therefore primarily available on weekdays. Following the April 2022 reorganization, local news and weather information for the prefecture was broadcast only on Saturdays, Sundays, and holidays at 18:45 on both television and radio. Outside of this time slot, local programming was mainly provided during extended holidays and the Obon holiday period. During the year-end and New Year's period, Kyushu-Okinawa regional news from Fukuoka was generally broadcast as usual.

NHK+ added regional programming, including programming from Okinawa, on May 15, 2023.[6].

== Status of services in the Daito Islands ==
All broadcasting services, including terrestrial digital broadcasting, can be used around the main island and in the Sakishima area, but due to geographical factors, the Daito Islands are as follows as of June 2019.

=== General and Educational Television ===
In the Daito Islands, which are far from the main island of Okinawa, it is not only impossible to directly receive terrestrial broadcasts, but there is also no cable TV. Therefore, in 1975, NHK Okinawa opened a broadcasting test station (currently a terrestrial broadcasting test station, call sign JO7D-TV), and the Okinawa broadcasting station sent videotapes containing programs to the Minami Daito Island office, where they were broadcast for only about four hours a day.

After that, in May 1984, test broadcasts of NHK BS1 (pre-2011 version), the predecessor of the current NHK BS1, began. It was originally planned to be a two-channel system, but due to a satellite failure, only one channel was broadcast. Programming began to be provided in the form of a general simulcast (with some delayed broadcasts and delayed broadcasts of educational TV programs). Following the reorganization of the schedule in 1987, simultaneous relays of the terrestrial signal began. From April 1998 until the end of analog broadcasting on July 24, 2011, NHK Tokyo broadcasts (JOAK-TV and JOAB-TV) intended for the Ogasawara Islands and transmitted by satellite were received and rebroadcast terrestrially. With the end of analog broadcasting, the source was switched to BS safety-net broadcasting in the latter half of 2010. Information about Okinawa Prefecture was conveyed by inserting text overlays on the screen via a telephone line.

Initially, it was said that a relay station for digital broadcasting was intended to be installed in 2010, but many problems arose, such as how to maintain the relay line between the main island and Daito Island and how to cover the installation costs. As a result, there was no prospect of opening the station. However, at the beginning of 2011, plans emerged to lay a submarine cable between the main island and Daito Island. The cable was laid later that year, and the station was opened on July 22, 2011, two days before the last day of analog broadcasting.

For the above reasons, until the summer of 2010, when a school representing Okinawa participated in the Senbatsu High School Baseball Tournament or the National High School Baseball Championship, its games were broadcast live on NHK BS2 (discontinued in March 2011 and currently integrated into NHK BS Premium).

=== Radio 1 ===
On April 1, 2007, a relay station was opened using FM conversion, but since signals are transmitted via satellite communication lines between the main island and Daito Island, reception may be unavailable during extremely severe weather.

=== NHK-FM ===
NHK-FM generally cannot be received, except during sporadic E propagation from May to August. No relay station has been installed (and an opening date has not been determined). The Daito Islands remain the only area in Japan where direct reception of NHK-FM radio broadcasts is not possible.

=== Multiple stations ===
Since September 1, 2011, NHK Net Radio RADIRU★RADIRU, which simultaneously distributes NHK Radio 1, NHK Radio 2 and NHK-FM on the internet, has been launched in the Daito Islands.

Initially, only broadcasts from four stations in Sendai, Tokyo, Nagoya, and Osaka were retransmitted, but in September 2016, coverage was expanded to eight major cities nationwide, adding Sapporo, Hiroshima, Matsuyama, and Fukuoka. This made it possible to listen to programs "for Kyushu and Okinawa" from Fukuoka. However, some programs cannot be distributed simultaneously due to rights restrictions. Consequently, prefecture-specific FM programs and other local programs cannot be heard on RADIRU★RADIRU unless a transmission line or relay station is established.

== Channels and frequencies ==
=== Callsign ===
- General system: Radio 1 broadcast JOAP, General TV JOAP-DTV, FM broadcast JOAP-FM
- Educational system: Radio 2 Broadcast JOAD, Educational TV JOAD-DTV

Before the war, "JOAP" was designated as the Okinawa broadcasting station, but with the end of the war in 1945, it was abolished, and after the war it was designated as "JOAP-FM" for the Maebashi station's FM broadcasting. After that, when the Okinawa Broadcasting Corporation was reorganized into the NHK Okinawa Broadcasting Station due to the reversion to the mainland, there was an opinion that it would be preferable to designate "JOAP" for the newly opened Okinawa station, and "JOAP" was transferred from the Maebashi station to the Okinawa station. handed over. Along with this, Maebashi's FM station was changed to JOTP-FM, and Kyoto's FM station, which had this call sign, refused the planned abolition of the first broadcast (later abolished in 2015). Therefore, it was changed to JOOK-FM.

=== Television ===
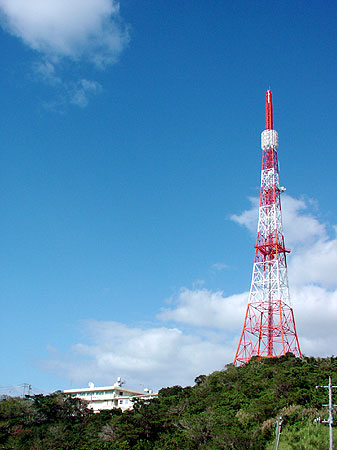
Former station building of NHK Okinawa Broadcasting Station in Tomigusuku City (still used as a TV transmitting station)

Region	Station name	Digital				Analog			Remarks
Region	Station name	GTV channel	ETV channel	Antenna power	Opening date	General channel	Educational channel	Video antenna power	Remarks
Around the main island	Tomigusuku	17	13	1 kW	2006-04-01	2^{+}	12	5 kW	Maximum effective radiated power is 10 times
Around the main island	Nakijin	38	40	30W	2007-12-01	38	40	300W	Opened in 1969 during the OHK era, Okinawa's first UHF relay station
Around the main island	Kumejima	33	25	3W	2007-12-01	36	34	30W	Opened in 1971 during the OHK era
Around the main island	Shuri					60	62	3W	
Around the main island	Nanjo Sashiki	36	25	3W	2007-12-01	60	62	30W	
Around the main island	Ginowan	21	19	1W	2009-12-01	41	43	10W	
Around the main island	Goya	36	25	1W	2009-12-01	24	26	10W	
Around the main island	Gushikawa	19	25	1W	2009-12-01	46	48	10W	
Around the main island	Okinawa Ishikawa	36	25	0.3W	2008-12-01	60	62	3W	
Around the main island	Onna					41	43	3W	
Around the main island	Nago Agarie					44	46	1W	
Around the main island	Motobu	46	45	0.1W	2008-12-01	60	62	1W	
Around the main island	East Kumejima	20	19	0.1W	2008-12-01	51	49	1W	It was installed when the Kumejima station shifted to UHF.
Sakishima Islands	Taira	17	13	100W	2008-05-01	7(9)	4	1 kW	Master station in the Sakishima area until the submarine cable opened
Sakishima Islands	Tarama	22	18	0.1W	2008-12-06	60	62	1W	
Sakishima Islands	Ishigaki	26	24	100W	2008-12-06	9(11)	12	1 kW	During the OHK era, it was the parent station at Yaeyama Broadcasting Station
Sakishima Islands	Kawahira, Ishigaki	22	18	30W	2009-04-xx	11(13)	6	500W	
Sakishima Islands	Sonai	17	13	1W	2009-04-xx	8(10)	1	30W	
Sakishima Islands	Yonaguni	36	45	1W	2009-04-xx	37	10W		
Daito Islands	Minamidaito	32	27	3W	2011-07-22	54	52	30W	The analog master station is the Tokyo head office, broadcasting started in April 1998, broadcasting ended at the end of June 2010
Daito Islands	Kitadaito	42	40	3W	2011-07-22	42	40	10W	The analog master station is the Tokyo head office, broadcasting started in April 1998, broadcasting ended at the end of June 2010

=== Radio ===
Station name	Radio 1		Radio 2		NHK-FM		Remarks
Station name	Frequency	Antenna power	Frequency	Antenna power	Frequency	Antenna power	Remarks
Naha	549 kHz	10 kW	1125 kHz	10 kW	88.1 MHz	1 kW	FM transmitted from TV station
Nago	531 kHz	1 kW					Installed on Yagaji Island in 1986 to eliminate hearing loss in the northern part of the main island
Nakajin					84.8 MHz	100W	
Kumejima					84.2 MHz	10W	
Taira	1368 kHz	100W	1602 kHz	100W	85.0 MHz	1 kW	FM started at the same time as the submarine cable line was completed in December 1976 (Yonaguni FM station is also the same)
Ishigaki	540 kHz	1 kW	1521 kHz	1 kW	87.0 MHz	100W	FM started at the same time as the submarine cable line was completed in December 1976 (Yonaguni FM station is also the same)
Kabira					77.7 MHz	100W	
Tarama					86.2 MHz	30W	
Sonai	85.2 MHz	10W	83.1 MHz	10W			Radio 1 was opened in 1991 and Radio 2 in 2003 to eliminate medium wave interference and enhance disaster prevention broadcasting.
Yonaguni	83.5 MHz	10W	80.3 MHz	10W	85.8 MHz	10W	AM was opened in 2003 to eliminate interference caused by medium waves.
Minamidaito	83.5 MHz	100W					Opened on April 1, 2007, to eliminate interference caused by medium waves

=== Satellite relays in the Daito Islands ===
Due to geographical and technical circumstances in the Daito Islands, satellite broadcasting (BS1/BS2) was used from the start of experimental satellite broadcasting in May 1984 to the start of terrestrial retransmission broadcasting in April 1998, in Minami-Daito and Kita-Daito islands, and was continued thereafter. In both cases, BS analog broadcasting was converted to terrestrial broadcasting, so it could be viewed with a VHF antenna, but after the end of analog broadcasting (complete transition to BS digital), relay stations have been abolished (After the shift to digital, it will be received with a satellite dish).

=== Minamidaito BS relay station ===
- Old BS1 → BS1 channel 4, 100W
- BS2 → BS Premium channel 6, 100W

== Branch offices/bureaux ==
There are two "branch offices" in Okinawa City in the central part of the main island and Nago City in the northern part in order to respond to news coverage etc. in places far from the station in Naha City. In addition, in the Sakishima area where the Okinawa Broadcasting Corporation Broadcasting Station used to be, an office has been set up to handle news coverage, reception fee administration, and reception consultation.

=== Branch offices ===
- Okinawa
- Nago

=== Bureaux ===
- Miyakojima
- Yaeyama

== Main programs produced by the Okinawa station ==
Data as of April 2023.

=== General TV ===
Bolded programs are available on NHK Plus's Local Plus.

- News/weather information
  - Weekdays 11:57-12:00 (only weather), 12:15-12:20 (only news)
  - Weekends and holidays 18:45-18:59
- Good Morning Okinawa (07:45-08:00)
  - 07:45-07:55 given to local news, remaining 5 minutes given to weather bulletin from NHK Fukuoka (from Good Morning Kyushu Okinawa)
- Okinawa Chura TV (11:40-12:00, national weather between 11:54-11:57)
- **Okinawa HOTeye** (18:10-18:59)
- News 845 Okinawa (20:45-21:00)
- **Kinkuru 〜Okinawa Friday Cruise〜** (irregular Fridays 19:30-19:55, sometimes to 20:00 depending on the content)
- Typhoon information
- **Okinawan Songs and Dances** (at least one Friday per month 19:30-19:57, program created in 1969 in the OHK days)

=== Educational TV ===
- **Uchinaa de Asobo** (Mondays and Wednesdays 17:30 - 17:35, Fridays 8:50 - 8:55)

=== Radio 1 ===
- Weekday radio news for Okinawa prefecture at 09:55, 11:50 (simulcast with NHK-FM), 12:15 (simulcast with NHK-FM), 13:55, 17:55 and 18:50 (simulcast with NHK-FM)
  - Other than the above, news bulletins from NHK Fukuoka are broadcast.
  - Okinawa Enthusiast Club (last Friday of the month, 17:05-17:55)

=== NHK-FM ===
  - Okinawa Music Journey (first Friday of the month, 18:00-18:50)

== Past programs ==
=== General TV ===
- ニューススタジオ沖縄
- イブニングネットワークおきなわ
- 630沖縄
- あたらしい沖縄のうた（1977-2008）
- おきなわチャンプルータイム
- りっかりっか沖縄
- 太陽カンカンワイド（てぃだかんかんわいど。April 1, 1997 – March 31, 2006）
- 沖縄情報市場（2006年4月3日 - 2007年3月）
- おもろてれぐすく
- ハイサイ!てれびすかす
- ハイサイ!ニュース610（2007-2010）
- NEWSおきなわ610
- ドキュメント沖縄（2007-2008）
- 復帰40年企画・NHKが映した沖縄（2012）

=== NHK-FM ===
- うちなぁジョッキー（Featured since 2010）
