= Kusunoki's Flunking Her High School Glow-Up =

Japanese manga series

- First tankōbon volume cover, featuring Shizuka Kusunoki

楠木さんは高校デビューに失敗している (Kusunoki-san wa Kōkō Debyū ni Shippai Shite Iru)
- Genre: Coming-of-age; Romantic comedy
- Manga
- Written by: Mitsuki Mii
- Published by: Ichijinsha
- English publisher: NA: Kodansha USA
- Magazine: Comic Pool
- Original run: October 21, 2022 – present
- Volumes: 8
- Anime television series
- Directed by: Midori Yui
- Written by: Midori Yui
- Music by: Hyadain
- Studio: Passione; Hayabusa Film
- icon

Kusunoki's Flunking Her High School Glow-Up (Japanese: 楠木さんは高校デビューに失敗している, Hepburn: Kusunoki-san wa Kōkō Debyū ni Shippai Shite Iru) is a Japanese manga series written and illustrated by Mitsuki Mii. It began serialization on the Pixiv Comic website under Ichijinsha's Comic Pool brand in October 2022. An anime television series adaptation produced by Passione and Hayabusa Film has been announced.

== Plot ==
When he was in middle school, Keisuke Shizuki was the subject of disdain by others due to his introverted personality and appearance. Traumatized by his past, he decides to change his appearance and personality upon entering high school, working to become a completely different person. While he is successful, he is aware that one of his classmates, the popular and beautiful Shizuka Kusunoki, is aware of his past. The two find themselves becoming closer, brought together by their shared past and their desire to change themselves in high school.

== Characters ==
Keisuke Shizuki (志月 恵助, Shizuki Keisuke)
Voiced by: Yūto Uemura
A first-year high school student and Kusunoki's classmate. The two went to the same junior high school. He used to be an introvert who wore glasses, but changed his appearance and demeanor upon entering high school.
Shizuka Kusunoki (楠木 静, Kusunoki Shizuka)
Voiced by: Tomori Kusunoki
A first-year high school student and Shizuki's classmate. Similar to him, she too was an introvert who wore glasses and had a completely different appearance and personality. As a high schooler, she has become beautiful and popular, with rumors of her already being the subject of confessions.

== Media ==
=== Manga ===
Written and illustrated by Mitsuki Mii, Kusunoki's Flunking Her High School Glow-Up began serialization on the Pixiv Comic website under Ichijinsha's Comic Pool brand on October 21, 2022. Its chapters have been collected into eight tankōbon volumes as of July 2026.

During their panel at Anime NYC 2023, Kodansha USA announced that they had licensed the series for English publication.

No.	Original release date	Original ISBN	North American release date	North American ISBN
1	January 25, 2023	978-4-7580-1799-2	August 20, 2024	979-8-8887-7271-3
1. "I'll Never Make the Mistake of Associating with Cute Girls Again"; 2. "She Doesn't Get to Dictate the Course of My Life"; 3. "At School, Kusunoki Is Off Limits"; 4. "Because of Her Suggestive Choice of Words"; 5. "If Kusunoki's Mad, It Isn't My Problem"; 6. "Proof that God Doesn't Exist"; 7. "These Are the Times You Need to Keep a Cool Head"; Bonus: "Alone Together"
2	August 28, 2023	978-4-7580-1836-4	October 22, 2024	979-8-8887-7272-0
8. "She Keeps Making Me Double-Guess What She's Saying"; 9. "Has My Logic Been Wrong All Along?"; 10. "Looking at Us Now, Would Other People Think We're Dating"; 11. "In a Girl's World, You Can't Survive on Looks Alone"; 12. "The Friend of a Friend Is Basically an Enemy"; 13. "I Mean, She's the Root of My Trauma"; 14. "Friends Don't Need to Feel Weird Over Friends"
3	January 25, 2024	978-4-7580-1859-3	December 24, 2024	979-8-8887-7273-7
15. "If I Told Her, She'd Either Laugh or Gag"; 16. "My Eyes Work Fine, But All They See Is a Kid"; 17. "My High School Dream Has Only Just Begun"; 18. "Princess and I Are At Totally Different Stages"; 19. "The Moment I Fell for Her"; 20. "Looking at Her Closely, She Does Have a Pretty Face"; 21. "I Think I See Why They Get Along So Well"; 22. "She Doesn't Remember, Not a Single Bit"
4	June 25, 2024	978-4-7580-1907-1	April 15, 2025	979-8-8887-7409-0
23. "Good Job On Your Glow-up, Shizuki-kun"; 24. "I Worshipped the Ground You Walked On"; 25. "When Kusunoki Came Along"; 26. "I Didn't Fall for Her Because She's Nice and Cute"; 27. "I'm Gonna Need to Keep Far Away from Kusunoki Today"; 28. "I Avoided You Because I Was Embarrassed"; 29. "I'd Rather Keep the Status Quo Than Destroy It"; 30. "She and I Are Far from Friends"
5	January 29, 2025	978-4-7580-1961-3	December 2, 2025	979-8-8887-7590-5
31. "The Sense I Was Straying from My Ideal"; 32. "Where's the Fun in a School Festival?"; 33. "I'd Never Seen Her Smile So Sadly"; 34. "For Kusunoki, I Would"; 35. "Even If Hebikawa Is Sick, It's None of My Business"; 36. "Such a Bleeding Heart"
6	July 25, 2025	978-4-7580-8738-4	May 19, 2026	979-8-8887-7748-0
37. "I Want the Princess's Opinion"; 38. "Kusunoki's Really Pretty"; 39. "I Don't Want to Reject Myself"; 40. "Shizuki, the One Who Doesn't Treat Me Like a Girl"; 41. "I Think My Relationship with Kusunoki Is Changing"; 42. "I Just Need to Make Shizuki-kun Mine First"
7	January 28, 2026	978-4-7580-8937-1	January 19, 2027	979-8-9007-4002-7
8	July 28, 2026	978-4-8251-0040-4	—	—

=== Anime ===
An anime television series adaptation was announced on July 23, 2026. It will be produced by Passione and Hayabusa Film and directed by Midori Yui, who will also handle the series composition, with characters designed by Koji Haneda and music composed by Hyadain.

== Reception ==
The series was nominated for the ninth Next Manga Awards in the web category.
