= Ryukyu Asahi Broadcasting =

JORY-DTV

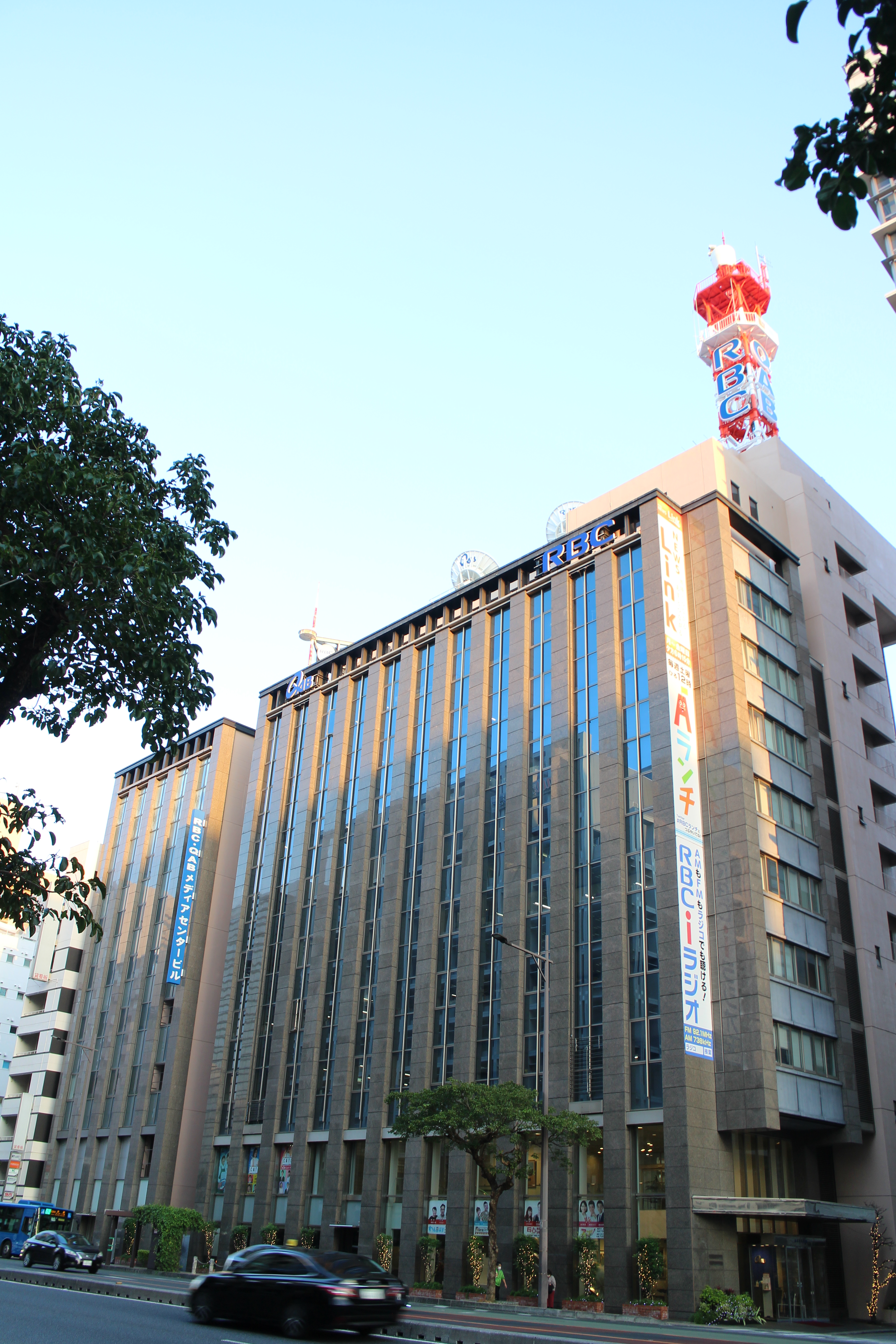
- QAB's headquarters at the RBC-QAB Media Center in Naha.
- Okinawa Prefecture; Japan
- City: Naha
- Channels: Digital: 16 (UHF); Virtual: 5
- Branding: Ryukyu Asahi Broadcasting; QAB

Programming
- Affiliations: All-Nippon News Network

Ownership
- Owner: Ryukyu Asahi Broadcasting Corporation

History
- First air date: October 1, 1995
- Former call signs: JORY-TV (1995–2011)
- Former channel numbers: Analog: 28 (UHF) (1995–2011)
- Call sign meaning: RY for Ryukyu Islands

Technical information
- Licensing authority: MIC

Links
- Website: www.qab.co.jp

Corporate information
- Native name: 琉球朝日放送株式会社
- Romanized name: Ryukyu Asahi Hōsō Kabushiki-Gaisha
- Type: kabushiki gaisha
- Industry: Television broadcasting
- Founded: June 10, 1994; 32 years ago
- Headquarters: 2-3-1 Kumoji, Naha City, Okinawa Prefecture, Japan
- Key people: Naoki Uehara (President & CEO)
- Services: Broadcast television
- Owner: TV Asahi Holdings Corporation (19.86%); The Asahi Shimbun (17.14%)
- Number of employees: 54
- Footnotes; Data from its Corporate Profile

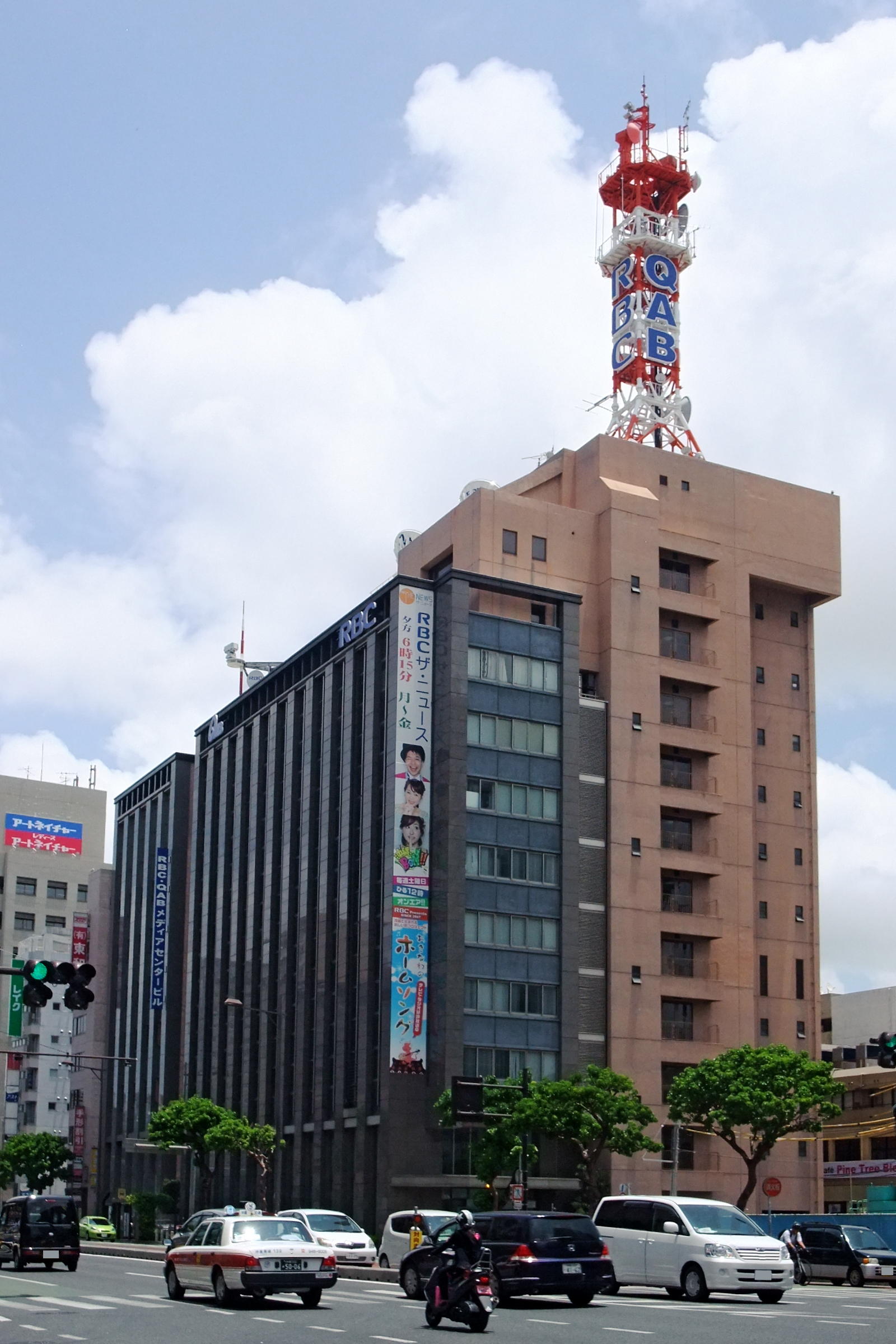
RBC-QAB media center building

JORY-DTV (channel 5), also known as QAB, is a Japanese television station serving Okinawa Prefecture as an affiliate of the All-Nippon News Network. The station is owned-and-operated by Ryukyu Asahi Broadcasting Corporation (Note: 琉球朝日放送株式会社, Ryukyu Asahi Hōsō Kabushiki-Gaisha) and its studios and headquarters are located in the Kumoji district of Naha, which is shared with the headquarters for Ryukyu Broadcasting Corporation, which QAB has a relationship with.

== Overview ==
QAB was the first commercial TV station to open in Okinawa Prefecture after its reversion to Japan in 1972, and is also one of the new Heisei stations. Overall, it is the 122nd commercial television station to launch in Japan (the third in the prefecture). Since the main station was the first UHF TV station in the prefecture (UHF channel 28 in Naha), a new UHF antenna was required in some areas to watch the station. For this reason, for several years after the start of test broadcasts, a 5-minute program "アンテナ情報" (literally "Antenna Information") was broadcast to explain how to install the antenna (In areas that receive relay stations other than the Naha main station, there are already UHF relay stations at other locations, and most households have UHF antennas, so it was possible to watch by setting the channel on the TV itself).

RBC has invested in the company and shares the RBC building (floors 2 and 6 of the RBC Hall), so many employees and staff are seconded from RBC. This is based on the business alliance between RBC and TV Asahi, which was concluded on the premise of the friendship between the Okinawa Times and the Asahi Shimbun, which have a close relationship with RBC, and the opening of the station. QAB conducts part of the broadcasting operations related to announcements, reporting, and sales in-house, and outsources most of the broadcasting operations to RBC, including facility management of company buildings and transmission stations, and transmission masters. In effect, RBC has one station and two waves, and it is positioned as the second channel of RBC TV. Initially, QAB sought to integrate RBC and the news department, but it was postponed due to the possibility of conflict with the JNN exclusive agreement of "not allowing participation of broadcasting stations belonging to other networks". Initially, TV Asahi was planning to open the station alone, but RBC, who was afraid of collapsing together, negotiated with TV Asahi and tenaciously negotiated with the Ministry of Posts and Telecommunications (at that time) to build the current system.

There was a possibility of simultaneous opening with fourth Okinawan station (UHF channel 30, Nansei Broadcasting, a station that was planned to be affiliated with Nippon Television in Okinawa Prefecture), which was planned in the 1990s.

Only TVQ Kyushu Broadcasting, affiliated with TV Tokyo in Fukuoka Prefecture, uses the abbreviation "Q". The logo has a Latin letter 'A' inside the '\' part of a 'Q' shaped like a satellite dish.

There are no Nippon Television affiliated stations and TV Tokyo affiliated stations in Okinawa Prefecture, but the main station does not broadcast NTV-affiliated programs. On the other hand, TV Tokyo affiliated programs, programs of the affiliated stations of JAITS, and programs of the production committee method are partly broadcast in the form of program sales.

=== Financial information ===
Information correct as of March 31, 2021:

| Capital | Number of stocks | Number of shareholders |
|---|---|---|
| 700 billion yen | 14,000 stocks | 19 |

| Shareholder | Number of shares | Percentage |
|---|---|---|
| TV Asahi Holdings | 2,780 shares | 19.85% |
| Asahi Shimbun Publishing Company | 2,400 shares | 17.14% |
| Ryukyu Broadcasting Corporation | 1,120 shares | 8.00% |
| Okinawa Times Publishing Company | 950 shares | 6.78% |

== History ==
In 1986, the Ministry of Posts and Telecommunications released a plan for "four national networks", enabling virtually most of the country to have four commercial television stations at the very least. At the time, there were only two commercial television stations, RBC (Japan News Network) and OTV (FNN/FNS). The two networks that had no affiliate, NTV (NNN/NNS) and TV Asahi (All-Nippon News Network) were interested in opening a station there. In 1989, NTV made the first meeting for what would become its affiliate in Okinawa, Nansei Broadcasting. On June 15, 1992, TV Asahi established Ryukyu Asahi Broadcasting and registered its brand (the company has no relation to the current QAB).

On the other hand, the opening of a new television station would inevitably lead to an intensification of advertising competition, causing the existing stations to be passive for the launch of third station. In 1992, Kunio Orochi, then-president of RBC, suggested that the new station should be created under the principle of "one company, two stations". NTV and TV Asahi co-operated with RBC, using the talent and facilities of the extant station, in order to suppress initial costs. Both networks were interested in that idea, but since Okinawa Times, RBC's main shareholder, and The Asahi Shimbun had a co-operation relation, RBC decided to co-operate with TV Asahi instead. RBC was (then as now) a JNN affiliate. Considering that the network had an exclusivity agreement dating back to the late 1950s forbidding its stations to air newscasts from other networks as well as having dual affiliations, the attempt was contested by other JNN affiliates. After RBC announced that it would refuse to co-operate with TV Asahi to share footage and programming, JNN agreed with the business model. Preparation costs for the new network were evaluated at three billion yen; the revenue target was 1.25 billion yen in the first year alone. 60% of the company's capital were given to local companies from Okinawa, while companies from the Japanese mainland had 40%.

On May 24, 1993, TV Asahi held a press conference, with the plan of launching the Okinawan station in October 1995. Later, in the period between 1993 and 1995, RBC built a shared transmitting tower, with the aim of broadcasting the new station to 87,2% of the prefecture at the time of launching. RBC also expanded its building to accommodate QAB. When the station launched, half of the QAB staff would be given back to RBC. On March 12, 1994, QAB held a founders' general assembly and obtained its preliminary license on April 6. As QAB was the first UHF station in the prefecture, viewers had to acquire a dedicated antenna to watch it. One of the station's priorities was promoting the use of UHF antennas in the prefecture, resulting in 80% sales for such antennas in the year leading to its launch. Its brand was registered in April 1995, the station conducted its test broadcasts during the September 25-30 period.

At 6am (JST) on October 1, 1995, Ryukyu Asahi Broadcasting started its official broadcasts, becoming the third commercial television station in Okinawa Prefecture and ANN's 23rd full-time affiliate. During its first two weeks on air the station aired special programming that would be seen on the network, such as The Story of the Beautiful Ryukyu Islands, which the network aired on October 10. Between October 2-6, News Station was broadcast from QAB's studios. During fiscal 1996 (ending March 1997), the station sent 627 news items to ANN's news service. The station achieved net profits for the first time in 1999. Satellite news gathering was employed for the first time in 2000 with a dedicated vehicle to cover the G8 summit. In October of that year, it launched its official website. In April 2002, its ratings reached 15,4% during prime time and 15,8% during the whole evening, setting a new ratings record since launch.

RBC and QAB established a joint cabinet for the implementation of digital television in 1997. In February 2006, the annex at RBC's building was finished, with its second floor being used by QAB. Digital terrestrial signals started on December 1, 2006. That year alone, it cut all accumulated losses since its creation. It nabbed record high ratings for two consecutive years, in 2008 and 2009. In 2009, it established digital terrestrial relay stations in Miyakojima and Yaeyama, where its signal hadn't been received before. That same year, its net revenue reached 4.21235 billion yen, surpassing the four billion mark since its launch. The analog signal was switched off on July 24, 2011; the eve of its shutdown was marked by the launch of direct digital reception to the Daito Islands. In 2013, the station signed a co-operation agreement with Taiwanese cable network ETTV to share news items and have shared interviews.

== Programming ==
In its early years, its local news service was known as Station Q. Unusually for a Japanese television station, all presenters were female, which was also a national first. As QAB has no production department at the time of founding, Station Q was the only program it produced. Although it initially had an audience of just 1% among the local newscasts, it had risen to 6-7% in 1998, 10% in 1999 and, in 2003, achieved first place with an average share of 16%. In 2013, it was renamed Q Plus.

Its morning program is called I Can't Wait Until 10 O'Clock Tea! (十時茶まで待てない!) and is shown on weekdays. Since Asahi Shimbun is the sponsor of Japanese High School Baseball Championship (Summer Koshien), QAB started airing the tournament starting in its 1996 edition. In 2004, it added Speed!! Aim! Koshien (速报!!めざせ!甲子園), airing highlights and news of the preliminary rounds of the competition in Okinawa Prefecture. Also that year, it launched Cinema Paradiso, a monthly program with news from the cinema scene.

QAB also produces lots of documentaries, which are seen on the national TV Asahi network as well. In 1996, its documentary series Underwater Ruins of Okinawa gave particular national attention to the Yonaguni Monument. Its documentaries have won the Telementry awards numerous times.

== Criticism ==
The station aired a documentary on the effects of the arrival of the 7-Eleven chain to the prefecture, 7-Eleven Arrives to the Island: The Miracle and Expansion Challenge to Okinawa, between July 30 and September 21, 2019. On June 30, 2020, the Broadcasting Ethics & Program Improvement Organization (BPO) considered the program to be "erroneously" sponsored by Seven & I Holdings, parent company of the convenience store chain. The finding also noted that, although Seven & I did not sponsor the documentary, the message "Sponsored by Seven & I Holdings" appeared at the start and end.
