= Market reversal =

Market Reversal in Finance is a type of price retracement in which the value completely goes back to the beginning of the measured trading period.

One of the worst market reversals in global finance is the bull rally from 2003 which peaked in 2007 and collapsed which is now popularly known as The Great Recession.

== Use in technical analysis ==
In technical analysis, a market reversal refers to a change in the direction of a prevailing price trend. Technical analysts use chart patterns, support and resistance levels, and other indicators to assess whether a market is likely to reverse direction or continue moving in the same direction. Reversal patterns are generally time-frame dependent, since a short-term countertrend move may occur within a longer-term trend.

A specific example is a key reversal, a chart formation that signals a possible reversal of the current trend. In an uptrend, it occurs when the market opens above the previous close, reaches a new high for the trend, and then closes below the previous day's low; in a downtrend, it occurs when the market opens below the previous close, reaches a new low for the trend, and then closes above the previous day's high.
