= Okinawa Television =

Okinawa Television Broadcasting Co., Ltd.
- Logo used since 1976 (Note: The logo's wordmark has been in use since 1959.)

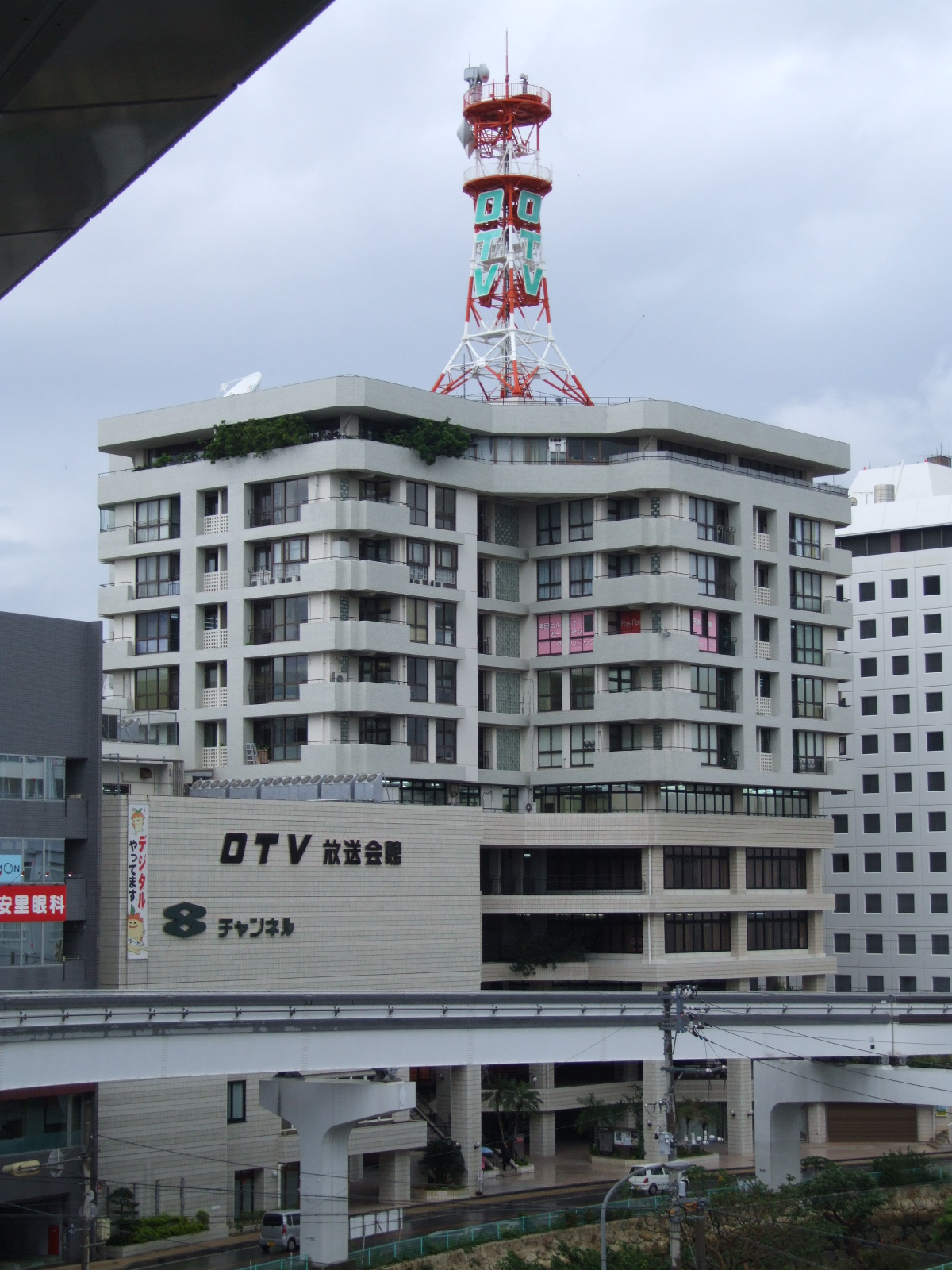
- Headquarters in Kumoji, Naha
- Native name: 沖縄テレビ放送株式会社
- Romanized name: Okinawa Terebi Hōsō Kabushiki-gaisha
- Company type: Private KK
- Industry: Media
- Founded: May 12, 1958; 68 years ago
- Headquarters: Kumoji, Naha, Okinawa Prefecture, Japan
- Key people: Ryuji Funakoshi (president)
- Products: Television station
- Website: www.otv.co.jp

JOOF-DTV
- Okinawa Prefecture; Japan
- City: Naha
- Channels: Digital: 15 (UHF); Virtual: 8
- Branding: Okinawa Television; OTV

Programming
- Language: Japanese
- Affiliations: Fuji News Network and Fuji Network System

Ownership
- Owner: Okinawa Television Broadcasting Co., Ltd.

History
- First air date: November 1, 1959
- Former call signs: KSDW-TV (1959–1972); JOOF-TV (1972–2011)
- Former channel numbers: Analog: 10 (VHF, 1959–1972); 8 (VHF, 1972–2011) (Note: US channel 10 is the same as Japanese channel 8, so no actual change of frequencies took place when the station came under Japanese regulation.)
- Call sign meaning: Okinawa Fuji (prefecture name/network affiliation)

Technical information
- Licensing authority: MIC

Okinawa Television Broadcasting Co., Ltd. (沖縄テレビ放送株式会社, Okinawa Terebi Hōsō Kabushiki-Gaisha), also known as OTV, is a Japanese broadcast network affiliated with the FNN/FNS. Their headquarters are located in Okinawa Prefecture.

It is the first commercial broadcaster to operate within Okinawa during the American occupation in the prefecture. In addition to airing Fuji TV programs, it also airs some of the Nippon TV output, and also represents Okinawa in the 24-Hour Television telethon. Okinawa has no NNN affiliate of its own, but there was a failed plan to introduce such an affiliate on UHF in the early 90s, the plan was eventually halted.

== History ==
=== American administration ===
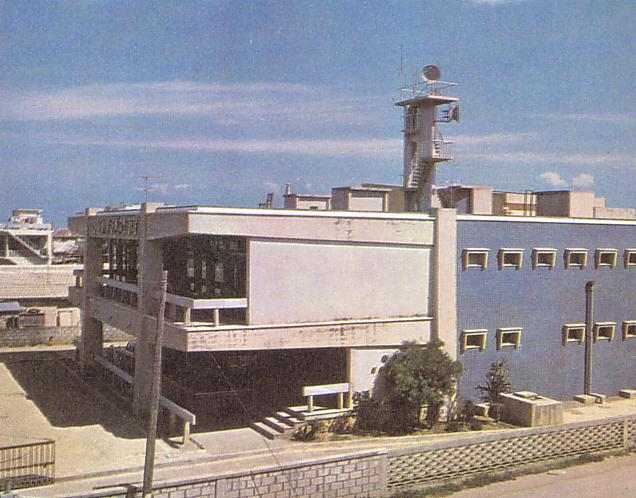
Okinawa Television's headquarters in 1964

The American Forces Radio and Television Service (AFRTS), which began airing in 1955, was Okinawa's first television station. (Note: Later AFN Prime Pacific. Broadcast on VHF channel 8 (6 in the Japanese standard). Shut down its terrestrial analog broadcast on the morning of June 30, 2011 and had its broadcasts restricted to military bases after that.) Because the initial transmission power was just 250 watts, it was virtually unknown in Japan outside of the US military. In July 1956, the administrative chairman of the Ryukyu Government, applied for the establishment for a television station; the preparatory license was granted in February 1958, and the inaugural meeting was held in April of the same year.

At that time, when Okinawa was under the rule of the United States, Okinawa TV was subject to restrictions in terms of foreign ownership, which made it difficult for them to operate. It then resulted in the forming of "Tokyo Okinawa TV Corporation", a joint company between Fuji Television and OTV, to attract advertisers from Tokyo. This is one of the reasons why OTV joined as a Fuji TV affiliate.

On October 16, 1959, Okinawa TV began test broadcasts; on November 1 of the same year, Okinawa TV officially launched, with the call sign KSDW-TV, becoming Okinawa's first private TV station. In 1963, Okinawa TV began to broadcast programs during the day, and the average daily broadcast time was extended to 11 hours; in the same year, Okinawa TV's turnover exceeded US$670,000, making a profit for the first time. The following year, with the completion of the microwave relay line between mainland Japan and Okinawa Prefecture, Okinawa TV started the real-time broadcast of programs from mainland Japan. At that time, the NHK did not have a branch in Okinawa, so Okinawa TV broadcast some NHK programs such as asadoras from 1964 to 1968. After the Okinawa Broadcasting Corporation started broadcasting in December 1968, Okinawa TV used Fuji TV programs fill the gaps left by NHK programs that moved to OHK. On May 5, 1968, Okinawa TV began to broadcast color TV programs, initially broadcasting 2 hours of color programs daily; in the same year, Okinawa TV's turnover exceeded US$1.2 million. In 1970, Okinawa Television realized stock dividends for the first time.

=== Post-reversion ===
After the reversion agreement of Okinawa in 1972, the call sign of Okinawa TV was changed from KSDW-TV to JOOF-TV (Note: The calls JOOF were first used in Gifu Prefecture for the first Gifu Broadcasting (GHK), later renamed Radio Tokai. The station merged with Kinki Tokai Radio in 1960 creating the current Tokai Radio. Kinki Tokai Radio's callsign, JOTF, was used for the Far East Broadcasting Company's station at the time of the reversion, said station shut down in 1984 and was "succeeded" (partly directly) by FM Okinawa. By 1972, both callsigns were unused in the mainland. The last letter in the calls (F) was mainly used by stations that started broadcasting on AM radio, this is the only such case where the calls were reused by a station that broadcast exclusively by television.), the channel number was changed from channel 10 to channel 8 (192–198 MHz in both systems), and the proportion of color programs increased to 91%. This year, Okinawa TV's turnover increased by 43.3%, reaching 950 million yen. In 1974, Okinawa Television achieved uninterrupted broadcasting throughout the day. In 1981, Okinawa Television began construction of a new headquarters, which was completed in February 1983. The new headquarters project cost 2.2 billion yen and has 12 floors above ground, of which floors 3 to 5 are exclusive spaces for Okinawa TV. The recording studio is located on the third floor, the news studio and the main control room are located on the fourth floor, and the various business offices are located on the fifth floor. Beginning in 1987, Okinawa TV produced a long-term documentary series "Okinawa Sends Us Earthlings" to introduce Okinawan immigrants from around the world. It was broadcast for 10 years with 135 episodes. In 1986, the turnover of Okinawa TV exceeded the turnover of Ryukyu Broadcasting television division for the first time. The turnover of Okinawa TV in 1987 reached 4.4 billion yen, which increased nearly five times in the 15 years after the reversion of Okinawa. In 1991, Okinawa TV station introduced the satellite news broadcast (SNG) system.

In 1993, Okinawa TV and Ryukyu Broadcasting jointly set up a relay station in the Sakishima Islands, enabling locals to watch private TV programs. In order to expand revenue other than TV advertising, Okinawa TV opened a housing exhibition hall in 1995 and entered the housing industry. In 1996, the documentary "Soldiers Waited for 50 Years by the Sad Wind" produced by Okinawa Television won the Grand Prize of the Federation of Civil Liberties and Liberation Awards and was the first TV station in Okinawa Prefecture. This honor was achieved once. Since the introduction of mechanical ratings surveys in Okinawa Prefecture, Okinawa TV won the triple crown of ratings in 1997 and 1998 (Note: Refers to leading the ratings in three periods: full day (6:00-24:00), prime time (19:00-22:00), and evening time (19:00-23:00).), and then won the triple crown of ratings for 11 consecutive years from 2002 to 2012.

=== Digitalization ===
On December 1, 2006, Okinawa TV began to broadcast digital TV signals, and stopped broadcasting analog TV signals on July 24, 2011. However, as the equipment investment costs of digital television became a heavy burden, Okinawa Television once again experienced a deficit in 45 years in 2007. In 2008, Okinawa TV returned to profitability. In 2012, Okinawa TV became an equity method subsidiary of Fuji Media Holdings. As of March 2016, Okinawa TV has ranked first in daily ratings for 236 consecutive months.
