= Okinawa Times =

Daily broadsheet newspaper in Okinawa, Japan

- Front page of Okinawa Times on 28 September 2026
- Type: Daily newspaper
- Founded: 1 July 1948
- Political alignment: Okinawan localism
- Headquarters: Naha, Okinawa, Japan
- Circulation: 153,370 (2010)
- Website: www.okinawatimes.co.jp(Japanese) www.okinawatimes.co.jp/category/okinawa-beat (English)

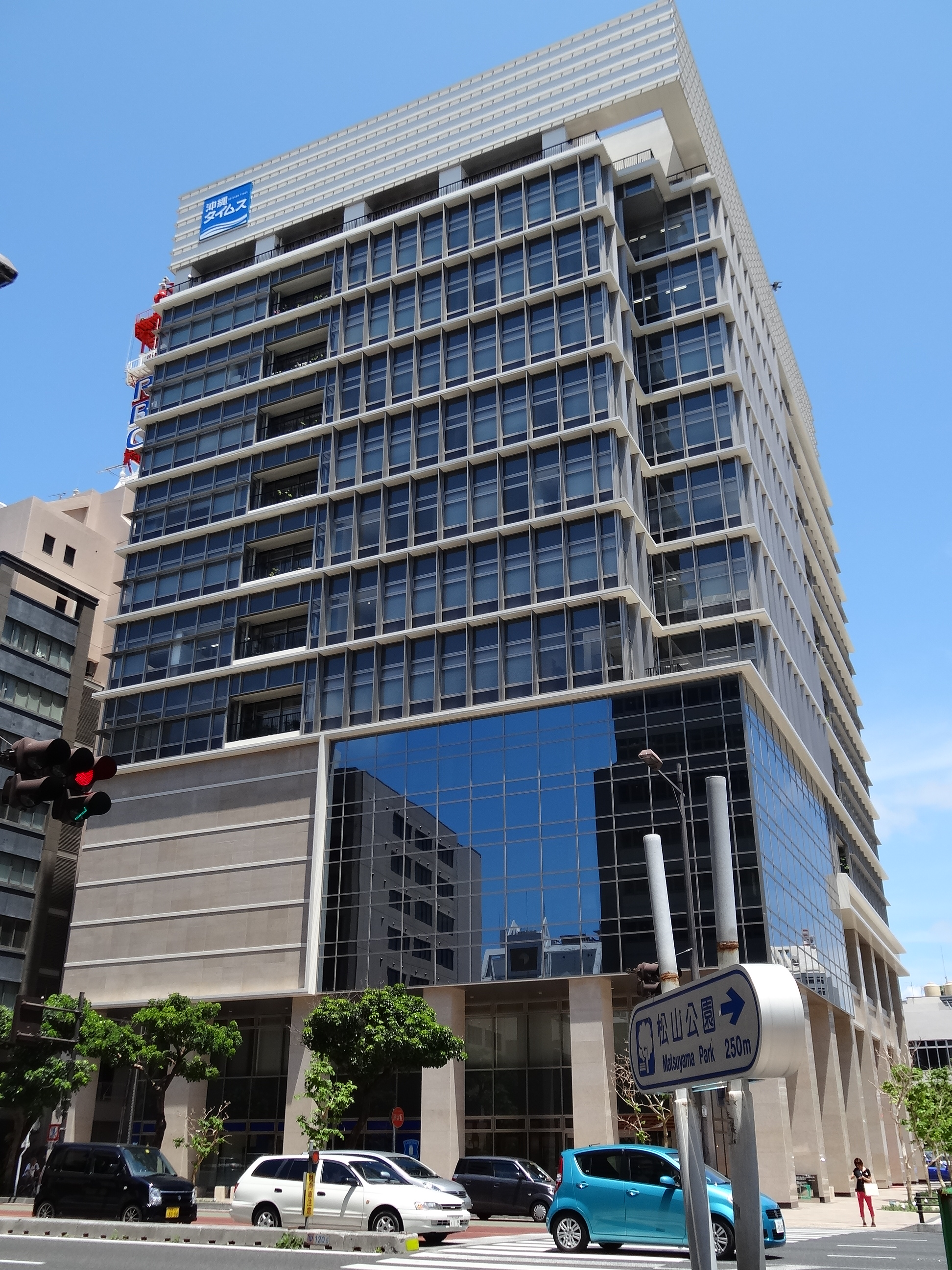
Head office in Naha

The Okinawa Times (沖縄タイムス) is a local newspaper based in Okinawa Prefecture, Japan. The company has its registered headquarters in Naha. The newspaper is one of the two major dailies in Okinawa, the other being Ryukyu Shimpo.

In 2015 the editor in chief was Kazuhiko Taketomi.

== See also ==
- Media of Japan
