= List of Spice and Wolf light novels =

The cover of the first volume of the Spice and Wolf light novel series released by Dengeki Bunko.

Spice and Wolf is a Japanese light novel series written by Isuna Hasekura with accompanying illustrations drawn by Jū Ayakura. The series follows a traveling merchant, Kraft Lawrence, who peddles various goods from town to town to make a living in a stylized historical setting with European influences. He meets a pagan wolf-deity girl named Holo who normally appears to be a fifteen-year-old girl, except for a wolf's tail and ears. Lawrence and Holo start traveling together, and as they travel, her wisdom helps increase his profits, but at the same time, her true nature draws unwanted attention from the church.

Originally, Hasekura entered the first novel in the series into ASCII Media Works' twelfth Dengeki Novel Prize in 2005 and the novel won the Silver Prize, placing third. Seventeen volumes were published between February 10, 2006, and July 10, 2011, under ASCII Media Works' Dengeki Bunko imprint. In 2016, an eighteenth book in the series was published, along with the start of a new spinoff series entitled Wolf on the Parchment, focusing on the characters Cole and Myuri. Yen Press licensed the light novels in September 2008 for distribution in English. The first volume was released in December 2009, and a new volume was released every six months, but in 2013 was changed to being released every four months. The tagline for the novel is "Merchant Meats Spicy Wolf.", an example of Engrish. The author of the novels has commented that what "meats" in the tagline means is kept a secret, alluding to a possible intentional misspelling of "meets".

== Volume list ==
=== Spice and Wolf ===
| No. | Title | Original release date | English release date |
|---|---|---|---|
| 1 | — | February 10, 2006; 978-4-8402-3302-6 | December 15, 2009; 978-0-7595-3104-8 |
"Prologue" (序幕, Jomaku): 1. "Chapter 1" (第一幕, Daiichi Maku); 2. "Chapter 2" (第二幕, Daini Maku); 3. "Chapter 3" (第三幕, Daisan Maku); 4. "Chapter 4" (第四幕, Daiyon Maku); 5. "Chapter 5" (第五幕, Daigo Maku); 6. "Chapter 6" (第六幕, Dairoku Maku); "Epilogue" (終幕, Shūmaku)
Lawrence meets Holo in the town of Pasloe. Holo feels that the townspeople of Pasloe have rejected her, and convinces Lawrence to take her back to her home in the north, Yoitsu. As they begin their travels together, Lawrence hears of a potentially profitable currency speculation deal, but soon, Lawrence and Holo get in well over their heads, and Lawrence has to decide if profit is worth sacrificing his newfound companion.
| 2 | — | June 10, 2006; 978-4-8402-3451-1 | June 15, 2010; 978-0-7595-3106-2 |
1. "Chapter 1" (第一幕, Daiichi Maku); 2. "Chapter 2" (第二幕, Daini Maku); 3. "Chapter 3" (第三幕, Daisan Maku); 4. "Chapter 4" (第四幕, Daiyon Maku); 5. "Chapter 5" (第五幕, Daigo Maku); 6. "Chapter 6" (第六幕, Dairoku Maku); "Epilogue" (終幕, Shūmaku)
Lawrence, with Holo's help, has made a good deal in Poroson, transporting a load of armor to Ruvinheigen on margin. On arriving in Ruvinheigen he discovers that the value of the armor has plunged, leaving him bankrupt. He and Holo recruit shepherd Norah Arendt to assist them in a desperate scheme to save Lawrence from bankruptcy. However, Lawrence, Holo, and Norah soon learn that some business partners cannot be trusted.
| 3 | — | October 10, 2006; 978-4-8402-3588-4 | December 21, 2010; 978-0-7595-3107-9 |
1. "Chapter 1" (第一幕, Daiichi Maku); 2. "Chapter 2" (第二幕, Daini Maku); 3. "Chapter 3" (第三幕, Daisan Maku); 4. "Chapter 4" (第四幕, Daiyon Maku); 5. "Chapter 5" (第五幕, Daigo Maku); "Epilogue" (終幕, Shūmaku)
Lawrence and Holo continue their journey to Holo's home – which Lawrence has heard was destroyed centuries ago, though he has hidden it from her thus far. In Kumersun, local merchant Amati falls for Holo, and forces on Lawrence a dagger-contract; he will pay Holo's (supposed) debt to Lawrence, free her, and propose marriage to her. Then, to make matters worse, Holo learns about Yoitsu's destruction, and distraught, lashes out at Lawrence, threatening to leave him for Amati. Lawrence hastily develops a plan to prevent Amati from fulfilling the contract, hopefully preventing Holo from leaving him for good.
| 4 | — | February 10, 2007; 978-4-8402-3723-9 | June 28, 2011; 978-0-7595-3108-6 |
1. "Chapter 1" (第一幕, Daiichi Maku); 2. "Chapter 2" (第二幕, Daini Maku); 3. "Chapter 3" (第三幕, Daisan Maku); 4. "Chapter 4" (第四幕, Daiyon Maku); 5. "Chapter 5" (第五幕, Daigo Maku); 6. "Chapter 6" (第六幕, Dairoku Maku); "Epilogue" (終幕, Shūmaku)
Lawrence and Holo stop in the village of Tereo, hoping to learn more about the fate of Yoitsu and Holo's friends. As they near Holo's home – their ultimate destination – they must face some uncomfortable questions about their future together and what will happen between them after they reach Yoitsu. While in Tereo, they become entangled in a dispute between it and a neighboring town. Lawrence and Holo use their unique talents to rescue themselves and the town from financial ruin – or worse.
| 5 | — | August 10, 2007; 978-4-8402-3933-2 | December 13, 2011; 978-0-7595-3110-9 |
"Prologue" (序幕, Jomaku): 1. "Chapter 1" (第一幕, Daiichi Maku); 2. "Chapter 2" (第二幕, Daini Maku); 3. "Chapter 3" (第三幕, Daisan Maku); 4. "Chapter 4" (第四幕, Daiyon Maku); "Epilogue" (終幕, Shūmaku)
Holo and Lawrence reach Lenos, where they sense something is amiss. Lawrence's merchant curiosity soon gets the better of him, much to Holo's dismay, and he is presented with an incredible opportunity by a mysterious fellow merchant named Eve – one that could easily make his dream of owning his shop come true. However, it forces him to weigh his dream against his feelings for Holo. Meanwhile, Holo reveals one of her greatest fears to Lawrence and wonders if it is time for them to end their journey together.
| 6 | — | December 10, 2007; 978-4-8402-4114-4 | June 26, 2012; 978-0-7595-3111-6 |
"Prologue" (序幕, Jomaku): 1. "Chapter 1" (第一幕, Daiichi Maku); 2. "Chapter 2" (第二幕, Daini Maku); 3. "Chapter 3" (第三幕, Daisan Maku); 4. "Chapter 4" (第四幕, Daiyon Maku); 5. "Chapter 5" (第五幕, Daigo Maku); "Epilogue" (終幕, Shūmaku)
Lawrence and Holo set off by boat in pursuit of Eve, who has pressed on with her scheme despite Lawrence withdrawing his support. During the trip, the two deal with the changes in their relationship brought about by Lawrence's confession of love to Holo at the end of the previous volume. While at a river checkpoint, Lawrence and Holo rescue a young boy from the north named Col and take him under their care, the three of them increasingly resembling a family. As they talk with Col and the other travelers they meet along the way, they learn more about what has become of Yoitsu and Holo's ancestors.
| 7 | Side Colors | February 10, 2008; 978-4-8402-4169-4 | December 11, 2012; 978-0-316-22912-8 |
1. "The Boy and the Girl and the White Flowers" (少年と少女と白い花, Shōnen to Shōjo to Shiroi Hana), from Dengeki hp volumes 47–49; 2. "The Red of the Apple, the Blue of the Sky" (林檎の赤、空の青, Ryūgō no Aka, Sora no Ao), from Dengeki hp volume 44; 3. "Wolf and Amber Melancholy" (狼と琥珀色の憂鬱, Ōkami to Kohakuiro no Yūutsu)
A detour from the original storyline that presents several side stories featuring the series's main characters. One features Holo's past hundreds of years before she arrives in Pasloe.
| 8 | Town of Strife I Tairitsu no Machi (Jō) (対立の町 (上)) | May 10, 2008; 978-4-04-867068-5 | April 23, 2013; 978-0-316-24546-3 |
"Prologue" (序幕, Jomaku): 1. "Chapter 1" (第一幕, Daiichi Maku); 2. "Chapter 2" (第二幕, Daini Maku); 3. "Chapter 3" (第三幕, Daisan Maku)
| 9 | Town of Strife II; Tairitsu no Machi (Ge) (対立の町 (下)) | September 10, 2008; 978-4-04-867210-8 | August 20, 2013; 978-0-316-24548-7 |
"Prologue" (序幕, Jomaku): 1. "Chapter 4" (第四幕, Daiyon Maku); 2. "Chapter 5" (第五幕, Daigo Maku); 3. "Chapter 6" (第六幕, Dairoku Maku); 4. "Chapter 7" (第七幕, Dainana Maku); 5. "Chapter 8" (第八幕, Daihachi Maku); 6. "Chapter 9" (第九幕, Daikyū Maku); "Epilogue" (終幕, Shūmaku)
| 10 | — | February 10, 2009; 978-4-04-867522-2 | December 17, 2013; 978-0-316-32236-2 |
"Prologue" (序幕, Jomaku): 1. "Chapter 1" (第一幕, Daiichi Maku); 2. "Chapter 2" (第二幕, Daini Maku); 3. "Chapter 3" (第三幕, Daisan Maku); 4. "Chapter 4" (第四幕, Daiyon Maku); 5. "Chapter 5" (第五幕, Daigo Maku); "Epilogue" (終幕, Shūmaku)
Following the rumours of the legendary wolf bones, Kraft Lawrence, Holo, and Col begin their trek north toward the Kingdom of Winfiel; a land known for its flourishing sheep and wool. Upon arrival, they discover that the Abbey of Brondel (which is rumoured to contain the legendary wolf bones) is in dire financial straits, a precarious position that has garnered the attention of the powerful Ruvik Alliance, which seeks to subjugate its long sustained holdings.
| 11 | Side Colors II | May 10, 2009; 978-4-04-867809-4 | April 22, 2014; 978-0-316-32427-4 |
1. "The Wolf and the Golden Promise" (狼と黄金色の約束, Ōkami to Koganeiro no Yakusoku), from Dengeki Bunko Magazine volumes 4 and 5; 2. "The Wolf and the Verdant Detour" (狼と若草色の寄り道, Ōkami to Wakakusairo no Yorimichi), from Dengeki Bunko Magazine prologue 2; 3. "The Black Wolf's Cradle" (黒狼の揺り籠, Kokurō no Yurikago)
In another detour from the main storyline of Holo and Lawrence's journey north, several stories featuring the main characters are featured. One pictures the wolf of the roam, Fleur Boland, and her upbringing as a young merchant before the events of Lenos.
| 12 | — | August 10, 2009; 978-4-04-867933-6 | August 26, 2014; 978-0-316-32432-8 |
"Prologue" (序幕, Jomaku): 1. "Chapter 1" (第一幕, Daiichi Maku); 2. "Chapter 2" (第二幕, Daini Maku); 3. "Chapter 3" (第三幕, Daisan Maku); 4. "Chapter 4" (第四幕, Daiyon Maku); 5. "Chapter 5" (第五幕, Daigo Maku); 6. "Chapter 6" (第六幕, Dairoku Maku); "Epilogue" (終幕, Shūmaku)
| 13 | Side Colors III | November 10, 2009; 978-4-04-868140-7 | December 16, 2014; 978-0-316-33661-1 |
1. "The Wolf and Honeyed Peach Preserves" (狼と桃のはちみつ漬け, Ōkami to Momo no Hachimitsuzuke), from Dengeki Bunko Magazine volumes 7 and 8; 2. "The Wolf and the Twilight-Colored Gift" (狼と夕暮れ色の贈り物, Ōkami to Yūgureiro no Okurimono), from Dengeki Bunko Magazine volume 6; 3. "The Wolf and the Silver Sigh" (狼と銀色のため息, Ōkami to Gin'iro no Tameiki), from Dengeki Maoh September 2009 issue 4. "The Shepherdess and the Black Knight" (羊飼いと黒い騎士, Hitsujikai to Kuroi Kishi)
| 14 | — | February 10, 2010; 978-4-04-868326-5 | April 21, 2015; 978-0-316-33959-9 |
"Prologue" (序幕, Jomaku): 1. "Chapter 1" (第一幕, Daiichi Maku); 2. "Chapter 2" (第二幕, Daini Maku); 3. "Chapter 3" (第三幕, Daisan Maku); 4. "Chapter 4" (第四幕, Daiyon Maku); "Epilogue" (終幕, Shūmaku)
Lawrence, Holo, and Col return to Lenos to prepare for their journey north as they await the delivery of the map to Yoitsu provided by Fran. While there, they unexpectedly meet Elsa (volume four) and her travelling companion Le Roi, a book merchant. Le Roi presents Lawrence with a profitable business proposition that will also serve to protect the lands where Yoitsu is located, but it will likely require Lawrence's early departure from Holo before they are able to reach Yoitsu together. Holo understands and encourages Lawrence to do the beneficial and practical thing, but Lawrence is gripped with disappointment and sadness even as he decides to accept the proposition. Seeing Lawrence's predicament, Elsa confesses her own conflicted interests between serving the church and wanting to marry Evan. But she then turns the tables on Lawrence demanding to know why he won't fight for what he truly wants – Holo. Inspired by Elsa, Lawrence decides to fight in the way he does best – a cunning scheme to fulfill his business obligation without having to travel apart from Holo. Failing to understand his actions taken to preserve their journey to Yoitsu, Holo broaches the "unspoken topic" and asks Lawrence why he wants to continue with her. Finally, their motivations become clear to each other and Holo confesses her true love for Lawrence.
| 15 | The Coin of the Sun I Taiyō no Kinka (Jō) (太陽の金貨〈上〉) | September 10, 2010; 978-4-04-868829-1 | August 25, 2015; 978-0-316-33961-2 |
"Prologue" (序幕, Jomaku): 1. "Chapter 1" (第一幕, Daiichi Maku); 2. "Chapter 2" (第二幕, Daini Maku); 3. "Chapter 3" (第三幕, Daisan Maku); 4. "Chapter 4" (第四幕, Daiyon Maku); 5. "Chapter 5" (第五幕, Daigo Maku)
| 16 | The Coin of the Sun II; Taiyō no Kinka (Ge) (太陽の金貨〈下〉) | February 10, 2011; 978-4-04-870265-2 | December 15, 2015; 978-0-316-33963-6 |
1. "Chapter 6" (第六幕, Dairoku Maku); 2. "Chapter 7" (第七幕, Dainana Maku); 3. "Chapter 8" (第八幕, Daihachi Maku); 4. "Chapter 9" (第九幕, Daikyū Maku); 5. "Chapter 10" (第十幕, Daijū Maku); 6. "Chapter 11" (第十一幕, Daijūichi Maku); 7. "Chapter 12" (第十二幕, Daijūni Maku)
| 17 | Epilogue | July 10, 2011; 978-4-04-870685-8 | April 19, 2016; 978-0-316-33964-3 |
"Epilogue" (終幕, Shūmaku): 1. "Traveling Merchant and Gray Knight" (行商人と鈍色の騎士, Gyōshōnin to Nibiiro no Kishi), from Dengeki Bunko Magazine volume 9; 2. "Gray Smiling Face and Wolf" (狼と灰色の笑顔, Ōkami to Haiiro no Egao), from Dengeki Bunko Magazine volume 13; 3. "White Path and Wolf" (狼と白い道, Ōkami to Shiroi Michi), from Dengeki Bunko Magazine volume 17
| 18 | Spring Log | September 10, 2016; 978-4-04-892355-2 | June 20, 2017; 978-0-316-47167-1 |
1. "The Margins of a Journey" (旅の余白, Tabi no Yohaku), from Dengeki Bunko Magazine volume 49; 2. "Golden Memories" (黄金色の記憶, Ōgonshoku no Kioku), from Dengeki Bunko Magazine volume 50; 3. "Muddy Messenger Wolf and Wolf" (狼と泥まみれの送り狼, Ōkami to Doromamire no Okuriōkami); 4. "Parchment and Graffiti" (羊皮紙と悪戯書き, Yōhishi to Itazuragaki), from Dengeki Bunko Magazine volume 51
| 19 | Spring Log II | May 10, 2017; 978-4-04-892891-5 | March 27, 2018; 978-1-9753-0012-8 |
1. "A Petal's Fragrance and Wolf" (狼と花弁の香り, Ōkami to Hanabira no Kaori), from Dengeki Bunko Magazine volume 53; 2. "Sweet Fangs and Wolf" (狼と甘い牙, Ōkami to Amai Kiba), from Dengeki Bunko Magazine volume 52; 3. "Grooming Sheep and Wolf" (狼と羊の毛づくろい, Ōkami to Hitsuji no Kedzukuroi), from Dengeki Bunko Magazine volume 54; 4. "Memories of Spice and Wolf" (狼と香辛料の記憶, Ōkami to Kōshinryō no Kioku)
| 20 | Spring Log III | February 10, 2018; 978-4-04-893619-4 | October 30, 2018; 978-1-9753-0278-8 |
1. "What Falls in Spring and Wolf" (狼と春の落とし物, Ōkami to Haru no Otoshimono), from Dengeki Bunko Magazine volume 56; 2. "The White Hound and Wolf" (狼と白い猟犬, Ōkami to Shiroi Ryōken), from Dengeki Bunko Magazine volume 55; 3. "Caramel Days and Wolf" (狼と飴色の日常, Ōkami to Ameiro no Nichijō), from Dengeki Bunko Magazine volume 58; 4. "Blue Dreams and Wolf" (狼と青色の夢, Ōkami to Aoiro no Yume), from Dengeki Bunko Magazine volume 59; 5. "Harvest Autumn and Wolf" (狼と収穫の秋, Ōkami to Shūkaku no Aki)
| 21 | Spring Log IV | January 10, 2019; 978-4-04-912200-8 | December 31, 2019; 978-1-9753-8680-1 |
1. "Beyond the Steam and Wolf" (狼と湯煙の向こう, Ōkami to Yukemuri no Mukō), from Dengeki Bunko Magazine volume 60; 2. "The Autumn-Colored Smile and Wolf" (狼と秋色の笑顔, Ōkami to Shūshoku no Egao), from Dengeki Bunko Magazine volume 62; 3. "The Colors of the Forest and Wolf" (狼と森の色, Ōkami to Mori no Iro), from Dengeki Bunko Magazine volume 64; 4. "The Eggs of a Journey and Wolf" (狼と旅の卵, Ōkami to Tabi no Tamago); 5. "Another Birthday and Wolf" (狼ともうひとつの誕生日, Ōkami to mō Hitotsu no Tanjōbi), from Dengeki Bunko Magazine volume 61
| 22 | Spring Log V | December 10, 2019; 978-4-04-912904-5 | November 2, 2021; 978-1-9753-1837-6 |
1. "Acorn Bread and Wolf" (狼とどんぐりのパン, Ōkami to Donguri no Pan); 2. "Tail Rondo and Wolf" (狼と尻尾の輪舞, Ōkami to Shippo no Rinbu); 3. "A Wedding for Wolves" (狼たちの結婚式, Ōkami-tachi no Kekkonshiki)
| 23 | Spring Log VI | September 10, 2021; 978-4-04-913942-6 | November 22, 2022; 978-1-9753-4864-9 |
| 24 | Spring Log VII | January 7, 2023; 978-4-04-914819-0 | August 22, 2023; 978-1-9753-7031-2 |
| 25 | Spring Log VIII | October 9, 2026; 978-4-0495-2371-3 | — |

=== Wolf and Parchment ===
| No. | Original release date | Original ISBN | English release date | English ISBN |
|---|---|---|---|---|
| 1 | September 10, 2016 | 978-4-04-892356-9 | November 28, 2017 | 978-0-316-47345-3 |
| 2 | March 10, 2017 | 978-4-04-892754-3 | May 8, 2018 | 978-1-9753-2620-3 |
| 3 | September 8, 2017 | 978-4-04-893338-4 | October 30, 2018 | 978-1-9753-2655-5 |
| 4 | March 9, 2019 | 978-4-04-912201-5 | December 3, 2019 | 978-1-9753-5956-0 |
| 5 | May 9, 2020 | 978-4-04-912452-1 | April 27, 2021 | 978-1-9753-2172-7 |
| 6 | March 10, 2021 | 978-4-04-913624-1 | March 22, 2022 | 978-1-9753-4043-8 |
| 7 | December 10, 2021 | 978-4-04-914040-8 | November 21, 2023 | 978-1-9753-5226-4 |
| 8 | August 10, 2022 | 978-4-04-914460-4 | May 21, 2024 | 978-1-9753-6958-3 |
| 9 | July 7, 2023 | 978-4-04-915146-6 | September 17, 2024 | 978-1-9753-9404-2 |
| 10 | April 10, 2024 | 978-4-04-915558-7 | April 29, 2025 | 979-8-8554-1084-6 |
| 11 | September 10, 2024 | 978-4-04-915802-1 | January 27, 2026 | 979-8-8554-1874-3 |
| 12 | April 10, 2025 | 978-4-04-916183-0 | August 11, 2026 | 979-8-8554-3450-7 |
| 13 | November 8, 2025 | 978-4-04-916594-4 | — | — |

== Additional books ==
=== Extra volumes ===
- Guide Book: Everything Spice and Wolf (狼と香辛料ノ全テ, Ōkami to Kōshinryō no Subete) – ISBN 978-4-04-867483-6 (December 10, 2008). Along with artwork and breakdowns of the worldbuilding of Spice and Wolf, the guidebook contains an original short story titled "Wolf and Starlight Howling" (狼と星色の遠吠え, Ōkami to hoshi-iro no tōboe). Also included are multiple interviews of members of the cast of the original anime.
- Picture Book: Spice and Wolf: Wolf and Golden Wheat (狼と香辛料 狼と金の麦穂, Ōkami to Kōshinryō: Ōkami to Kin no Mugiho) – ISBN 978-4-04-867793-6 (April 30, 2009). A short picture book/manga released with a limited edition DVD of the un-aired Episode 0, "Wolf And Amber Melancholy", of Spice and Wolf ll in April 2009.
- Art Book: Jū Ayakura Spice and Wolf Art Collection (文倉十画集 狼と香辛料, Ayakura Jū Gashū: Ōkami to Kōshinryō) – ISBN 978-4-04-870648-3 (July 30, 2011). A collection of Spice and Wolf promotional artwork. Also included in this art book is an original short story titled "Wolf and Rainbow-Colored Music" (狼と虹色の音楽, Ōkami to Nijiiro no Ongaku).
- Collection: Spice and Wolf Anniversary Collector's Edition – ISBN 978-0-316-46992-0 (November 15, 2016). To celebrate the upcoming tenth anniversary of Spice and Wolf Yen Press released a leather bound, premium, collection of the English translations of the first, original, 17 Spice and Wolf light novels. It is just shy of a thousand pages in length (sitting at a healthy 944 pages), and as such weighs quite a lot. As of November 2024, the collector's edition book has been printed only four times since 2016, with each printing being designated by a different bookmark ribbon color. First printings have a red ribbon. Second printings (the first international printing) have a green ribbon. Third printings have a blue ribbon. And fourth printings have a purple ribbon.
- Art Book: Keito Koume Illustrations Spice and Wolf: The Tenth Year Calvados (小梅けいと画集 狼と香辛料 十年目の林檎酒, Koumekeito gashū ōkami to kōshinryō jūnenme no ringo sake) - ISBN 4-04-892653-5, ISBN 1-9753-1579-0 (March 10, 2017 & November 17, 2020 [EN]). A collection of artwork by Keito Koume to celebrate the 10th Anniversary of Spice and Wolf. Originally released in Japanese in 2017, this art book was also released in English in 2020 and it remains the only Spice and Wolf art book with an official English translation. As a bonus, the art book also contains an original 14 page long full-color short manga titled Wolf and the Sweet Scent of Baking Bread (狼と小麦香の美控, Ōkami to komugi ka no bi hikae).

=== Short stories ===
- "Schoolgirl Holo-tan ♥" (学園ホロたん♥, Gakuen Horo-tan (Hāto Māku)), A short story from the Dengeki h&p "Beginning and End" official Pirate Book (電撃 h&p 『はじまり&ピリオド』 公式海賊本) released in November 2007 as a limited edition for the Dengeki 15 Year Festival.
- "Wolf and Starlight Howling" (狼と星色の遠吠え, Ōkami to hoshi-iro no tōboe), A short story from the Everything Spice and Wolf Guidebook (狼と香辛料ノ全テ 電撃文庫公式解読本) released on December 10, 2008, in Japan.
- "Dengeki Gakuen RPG Bunko Untitled Short Story", Included as a pre-order bonus for the release of the Dengeki Gakuen RPG: Cross of Venus video game on March 9, 2009, was a book containing a collection of original stories by popular Dengeki Bunko authors, titled Dengeki Gakuen RPG Bunko (電撃学園RPG文庫). Holo and Lawrence make an appearance in the game and as such, Isuna Hasekura was asked to write an original short story for the book. The short story is non-canon to Spice and Wolf and takes place within the Dengeki Gakuen RPG world. The story itself revolves around Lawrence finally getting his own dream store while at the academy, and the difficulty he faces running it with Holo while his workload increases.
- "Wolf and Rainbow-Colored Music" (狼と虹色の音楽, Ōkami to Nijiiro no Ongaku), A short story included in the Jū Ayakura Spice and Wolf Art Collection (文倉十画集 狼と香辛料) released on July 30, 2011. The story takes place after the epilogue of volume 17.
- "Spice and Wolf Light Novel Vol. 1-17 Kindle Collection Untitled Short Story", An exclusive, untitled short story released in the Japanese Kindle edition of Spice And Wolf Vol. 1-17 (【合本版】狼と香辛料 1～17巻収録) on June 10, 2016. The digital collection also contains an exclusive post-script by Isuna Hasekura.
- "Wolf and Dark Brown Fish Hooks" (狼と焦げ茶色の釣り針, Ōkami to kogecha-iro no tsuribari), A short story included as a hard-cover book in the Spice and Wolf 10th Anniversary Blu-ray Limited Edition released on October 5, 2016. The story takes place one summer after volume 16.
- "Wolf and the Sweet Scent of Baking Bread" (狼と小麦香の美控, Ōkami to komugi ka no bi hikae). A short, full-color, manga included in the back of the Keito Koume Illustrations Spice and Wolf: The Tenth Year Calvados (小梅けいと画集 狼と香辛料 十年目の林檎酒) art book released in Japan on March 10, 2017. This 14 page long manga has officially been translated to English along with the art book in which it is contained.
- "Wolf and Sweet Thoughts" (狼と甘い思惑, Ōkami to amai omowaku), A short story that was given away in a pamphlet for the Dengeki Bunko Autumn Festival 2017 x d Anime Store event from December 8–22, 2017. The pamphlet was to celebrate the Autumn 2017 anime season. It contains three short stories from three different franchises, of which Spice and Wolf is only one. The story is about Holo and Lawrence handling their food situation while they travel.
- "Wolf and Traveling Companions" (狼と旅のお供, Ōkami to tabi no otomo), A short story that was given away on a clear plastic folder at Newdays Convenience Stores during the NewDays × Dengeki Bunko 25th Anniversary Collaboration event. The Event took place between August 21 and September 3, 2018. During the event customers who spent more than 700 Yen in a Newdays store would be given a free folder with artwork of a multitude of Dengeki Anime Characters (Including Holo from Spice And Wolf, and Asuna from Sword Art Online) in Newdays employee outfits. Provided on the back of each folder was a short story about whichever character was on the front, and each story related to vegetables and/or cooking in some way.
- "Spice and Wolf VR Addendum Untitled Short Story", An untitled short story released as a bonus during the Spice And Wolf VR crowdfunding campaign from December 1, 2018 – January 12, 2019. Those who backed the deluxe edition of the Kickstarter would receive a small pamphlet with an original story taking place after the events of the Spice And Wolf VR game.
- "Wolf and Cherry Blossom Banquet" (狼と桜の宴, Ōkami to sakura no utage), A short story contained within the Kadokawa Light Novel EXPO 2020 Memorial Book (KADOKAWA ライトノベルEXPO2020 記念本) released during the 2020 Kadokawa Light Novel Expo. This short story is technically from the Wolf And Parchment sequel series, however Holo makes an appearance.
- "Wolf and the Midday Feast" (狼と宴の途中, Ōkami to utage no tochū), A short story given away at early screenings of the first four episodes of Spice and Wolf: Merchant Meets the Wise Wolf in select theaters in Japan on March 17, 2024. At the door guests were given a small postcard with artwork of Holo and Lawrence together. On the back of the postcard is a QR Code which leads to a website containing the short story.

== See also ==
- Spice and Wolf
- List of Spice and Wolf chapters
- List of Spice and Wolf episodes (2008 series)
- List of Spice and Wolf: Merchant Meets the Wise Wolf episodes (2024 series)
