= List of Spice and Wolf episodes =

The cover of the complete first season DVD collection released by Funimation Entertainment on December 22, 2009

Spice and Wolf is an anime television series adapted from the light novel series of the same name by Isuna Hasekura and Jū Ayakura. The episodes are directed by Takeo Takahashi and animated and produced by Imagin. The story follows a 25-year-old man traveling merchant named Kraft Lawrence who meets Holo, a female wolf deity of wheat. Holo, bound to a nearby town by an old promise to ensure good harvest, escapes with Lawrence when the townspeople stopped believing in her. Lawrence takes her north toward her homeland, Yoitsu, and she helps him with his business transactions in return.

The first season of the anime aired between January 9 and March 26, 2008, on the Chiba TV Japanese television network, and was later released on six DVD compilation volumes, each containing two episodes, though the first compilation contains three episodes. The volumes were released between April 2 and August 29, 2008, by Pony Canyon. The third volume, released on May 30, 2008, contains episode six of the television broadcast in addition to the unaired episode seven, which is included as an original video animation (OVA). A Blu-ray box set of the series was released on January 30, 2009, in Japan by Pony Canyon. The anime is licensed for release in English by Kadokawa Pictures USA and Funimation, and a complete 13-episode Region 1 DVD box set was released on December 22, 2009, in North America.

A second season, titled Spice and Wolf II, aired 12 episodes between July 9 and September 24, 2009. These episodes were released on four Blu-ray and DVD compilation volumes, each of which contains three episodes, between October 7, 2009, and January 6, 2010. Most of the staff from the first season returned, though Toshimitsu Kobayashi replaced Kazuya Kuroda as the character designer and chief animation director and Brain's Base managed the animation instead of Imagin. The script for both seasons was written by Naruhisa Arakawa, and the voice actors from the first season retained their roles. Another OVA, animated by Brain's Base, was released bundled with a picture book, written and illustrated by the light novel creators, entitled Spice and Wolf: Wolf and Gold Wheat (「狼と香辛料」狼と金の麦穂, Ōkami to Kōshinryō Ōkami to Kin no Mugiho). The bundle was released by ASCII Media Works on April 30, 2009, under their Dengeki Bunko Visual Novel imprint. Funimation licensed Spice and Wolf II and released the series in English on August 2, 2011.

In an interview with Darren Kwok in August 2015, original author Isuna Hasekura laid to rest speculation regarding the release of a potential third season for the anime series.

For the first season, the opening theme song is "Tabi no Tochū" (旅の途中) performed by Natsumi Kiyoura, while the ending theme song is "Ringo Biyori (The Wolf Whistling Song)" (リンゴ日和 〜The Wolf Whistling Song) performed by Rocky Chack. For the second season, the opening theme song is "Mitsu no Yoake" (蜜の夜明け) performed by Akino Arai, while the ending theme song is "Perfect World" performed by Rocky Chack. The background music soundtrack for both seasons is written by Yuji Yoshino.

== Series overview ==
Season	Episodes	Originally released	
Season	Episodes	First released	Last released
1	12 + OVA	January 9, 2008	March 26, 2008
2	12 + OVA	July 9, 2009	September 24, 2009

== Episodes ==
=== Season 1 (2008) ===
No. overall	No. in season	Title	Directed by	Storyboarded by	Animation directed by	Original release date
1	1	"Wolf and Best Clothes"; Transliteration: "Ōkami to Itchōra" (Japanese: 狼と一張羅)	Fumiaki Usui	Takeo Takahashi	Yoshio Kosakai, Midori Otsuka, Si Min Lee & Back Min Kyoung	January 9, 2008
Kraft Lawrence, a 25-year-old traveling merchant, arrives at the town of Pasloe during its harvest festival. In the fields surrounding the village, Lawrence meets a girl claiming to be the legendary wolf deity, Holo. Lawrence, in disbelief, asks her to prove it. The girl returns to her wolf form before disappearing. Back in town, Lawrence meets with a younger girl named Chloe, a former student of his. She asks if she can become Lawrence's business partner, but he declines, telling her that she is too young to make such a risky move. After leaving the town, Lawrence meets Holo again and learns that she escaped the town so that she can visit her homeland in the north. Lawrence agrees to let her accompany him on his travels.
2	2	"Wolf and Distant Past"; Transliteration: "Ōkami to Tōi Kako" (Japanese: 狼と遠い過去)	Masahisa Koyata	Takeo Takahashi	Midori Otsuka	January 16, 2008
While taking refuge from the rain inside a nearby church, Lawrence and Holo meet a traveling merchant named Zheren, who tells Lawrence of a plan to trade old Trenni silver coins for new ones to make a profit. Holo later tells Lawrence she sensed Zheren lying, though neither she nor Lawrence know why he lied. The next day, Lawrence agrees to meet with Zheren in the port city Pazzio to discuss further plans. After departing with Holo, Lawrence recounts how he was attacked by wolves "about eight times" in the forest. Holo defends the wolves' actions and Lawrence flares up in anger. After a lull in the conversation, Lawrence asks Holo if she has ever eaten a human, but she refuses to answer.
3	3	"Wolf and Business Talent"; Transliteration: "Ōkami to Shōsai" (Japanese: 狼と商才)	Mika Iwamoto & Jun Shishido	Tsutomu Yabuki	An Katsuragi	January 23, 2008
Lawrence and Holo arrive in Pazzio and prepare to sell fur before meeting with Zheren. Passing through a street lined with shops, Holo purchases a large quantity of apples which leave a scent on the furs, allowing Lawrence and Holo to sell the furs at a higher price to an assessor of the Milone Trading Company. That night, Lawrence and Holo meet with Zheren and finalize their partnership the following day, only later learning the purity in the Trenni silver coins has decreased, contrary to Zheren's claims.
4	4	"Wolf and Her Helpless Partner"; Transliteration: "Ōkami to Muryoku na Aibō" (Japanese: 狼と無力な相棒)	Masayuki Sakoi	Masae Nakayama	Tomoko Hirota & Back Min Kyoung	January 30, 2008
Lawrence enlists the help of Richten Marlheit, the branch manager of the Milone Trading Company, to counter Zheren's scheme. However, men from the Medio Trading Company, Zheren's associates, try to ambush Lawrence and Holo at night. Lawrence and Holo flee to the Milone Trading Company, but Holo acts as a diversion so Lawrence can escape to safety. After arriving at safety, Lawrence is told by Marlheit that the Milone Trading Company has all the information needed to defeat Zheren's plan and no longer needs Lawrence. To compound Lawrence's problems, a letter arrives from the Medio Trading Company, informing him that they know Holo is a wolf and are prepared to hand her over to the Church.
5	5	"Wolf and Lovers' Quarrel"; Transliteration: "Ōkami to Chiwagenka" (Japanese: 狼と痴話喧嘩)	Keiji Kawakubo	Yoshihiro Takamoto	Si Min Lee & Kimiko Tamai	February 6, 2008
After negotiating with Marlheit, Lawrence strikes a deal, convincing Marlheit to have the Milone Trading Company gather Trenni silver coins to obtain economic privileges as soon as possible, while he goes to rescue Holo from the Medio Trading Company. Once freed, Holo tells Lawrence that Chloe has joined forces with the Church and intends to turn Holo over to break away from the past when people depended on the favor of deities like Holo to survive. Noticing Holo's escape, Chloe begins to search for the pair, slowly encircling them.
6	6	"Wolf and Silent Farewell"; Transliteration: "Ōkami to Mugon no Wakare" (Japanese: 狼と無言の別れ)	Fumiaki Usui & Makoto Shinohara	Takeo Takahashi	Midori Otsuka, Sorato Shimizu & Mika Takazawa	February 13, 2008
While fleeing underground, Lawrence is stabbed by a pursuer of the Medio Trading Company, slowing him and eventually causing him and Holo to become trapped by Chloe. She tries to convince Lawrence to hand over Holo or else she will kill him, but he refuses. To protect Lawrence, Holo transforms into her wolf form and rampages through more pursuers before disappearing as Lawrence blacks out. Holo nearly kills a now-deranged Chloe, but spares her life instead; with her scheme ruined and her sanity crippled, Chloe flees. Lawrence awakens sometimes later in the Milone Trading Company headquarters, where he is informed that despite the vast profits, there were also vast losses in the coin venture. Lawrence takes the small remaining payment in pepper but soon receives a bill for new clothes and apples. After realizing that Holo is still around, Lawrence reunites with her and they agree to continue their travels together.
7	7	"Wolf and a Tail of Happiness"; Transliteration: "Ōkami to Kōfuku no Shippo" (Japanese: 狼と幸福の尻尾)	Mika Iwamoto	Hiroyuki Shimazu	Tomoko Hirota & Ki Duk Park	May 30, 2008 (OVA) (Note: Episode 7 never aired on television; it was released with the third DVD compilation in Japan as an original video animation.)
While in the town of Pazzio, Lawrence decides to purchase a better set of clothes for Holo. However, Lawrence only has a Lumione gold coin, too large denomination to purchase clothes. They return to Weiz, money dealer and fellow friend, intending to exchange it for Trenni silver coins and agree to meet later at a tavern for drinks. Lawrence uses a "secret technique" to buy clothes from a clothing shop owner for Holo that were once worn by a noble. He first buys cheap blankets at an inflated price to buy the expensive clothes at an extremely cheap price, made even cheaper by Holo's charm. Though the clothing shop owner makes a profit on the blankets, he loses money on the entire deal because of the more expensive clothes.
8	8	"Wolf and Virtuous Scales"; Transliteration: "Ōkami to Tadashiki Tenbin" (Japanese: 狼と正しき天秤)	Hidefumi Takagi	Hiroyuki Shimazu	Ki Duk Park & Yun Ju Ok	February 20, 2008
Lawrence and Holo travel to the town of Poroson, where Lawrence sells the pepper he received from the Milone Trading Company. During the exchange, Holo reveals that the shop owner of the Latparron Trading Company buying the pepper is attempting to swindle Lawrence. In exchange for not reporting the shop owner, Lawrence receives more profit than he originally expected. While traveling to the church city of Ruvenheigen, Lawrence and Holo talk about future profit from the armor he received from the shop owner and the illegality of smuggling gold. They pass a group of travelers who warn them of mercenaries from the north. Continuing on the road, they come across a female shepherd and stop to greet her, though Holo is less than enthusiastic because of the instinctive hostility between shepherds and wolves.
9	9	"Wolf and the Shepherd's Lamb"; Transliteration: "Ōkami to Hitsujikai no Kohitsuji" (Japanese: 狼と羊飼いの子羊)	Mika Iwamoto	Masae Nakayama	Tomoko Hirota & Back Min Kyoung	February 27, 2008
Just before Lawrence departs, the shepherd, named Nora Arendt, asks him if he would hire her as an escort to protect the party from wolves. After a conversation with Holo, Lawrence does so and the group heads off towards Ruvenheigen. Upon arrival, Lawrence and Holo parts ways with Nora to sell the armor in his cart. As Lawrence passes the initial inspection and pays the tax with two armor sets, he finds the city government reluctant to receive armor as payment. Lawrence and Holo head to the Rowen Trading Guild, a guild of which he is a member and is greeted warmly inside.
10	10	"Wolf and the Swirling Plot"; Transliteration: "Ōkami to Uzumaku Inbō" (Japanese: 狼と渦巻く陰謀)	Keiji Kawakubo	Takeo Takahashi	Sorato Shimizu	March 5, 2008
After Lawrence procures a certificate from the guild manager, named Jacob Tarantino, he goes to the Lemerio Trading Company to sell his armor. To his horror, he discovers that the armor market has crashed and that he now holds a very large debt and worthless goods. Lawrence is now faced with an ultimatum to pay back the debt in two days to Hans Lemerio, head of the Lemerio Trading Company, or be rendered bankrupt and thus be thrown out of society entirely. He desperately tries to find merchants willing to lend him money, but everyone turns him down. He realizes the merchants are unwilling to aid him because of his unmarried relationship with Holo, and, in a fit of rage, takes out his frustration on her. Even after Lawrence tries to apologize to her, Holo tells him that she is heading back to the inn for now.
11	11	"Wolf and the Biggest Secret Scheme"; Transliteration: "Ōkami to Saidai Hisaku" (Japanese: 狼と最大の秘策)	Yūsuke Onoda	Hiroyuki Shimazu	Ki Duk Park & Yun Ju Ok	March 12, 2008
Lawrence scrounges a few coins, but he has nowhere near enough to repay his debts. He attempts to give them to Holo as an apology for his earlier behavior, but she rejects them and chides Lawrence for being too nice and not blaming her for his situation. The next day, the pair goes to Lemerio and proposes gold smuggling to get out of debt. Since the Lemerio Trading Company has already failed and is also pressed for money, Holo drives him into a corner and he agrees with their scheme. Lawrence and Holo later meet with Nora and tell her about their plan. Knowing that gold sells at high prices in church-influenced cities compared to pagan cities, they plan to purchase gold in Lamtra and smuggle the gold in Nora's sheep's stomachs before selling the gold with immense profits in Ruvenheigen. After some persuasion from Lawrence, Nora agrees.
12	12	"Wolf and a Group of Youngsters"; Transliteration: "Ōkami to Wakazō no Mure" (Japanese: 狼と若僧の群れ)	Hidefumi Takagi	Masae Nakayama	Yoshio Kosakai	March 19, 2008
Marten Liebert, a businessman of the Lemerio Trading Company, accompanies Lawrence, Holo and Nora as they set off to Lamtra on a mission to smuggle gold. Halfway through the forest, they are attacked by wolves, but Nora keeps them at bay. Upon arrival at Lamtra, Liebert retrieves a bag full of gold and the group begin their return trip. In the forest, they are surrounded by wolves again, this time led by an alpha wolf. Lawrence tells Nora and Liebert to go ahead. After they leave, Lawrence reluctantly departs as well to let Holo deal with the wolves. He waits for her near the edge of the forest but is attacked, tied up, and left for the wolves by three men from the Lemerio Trading Company, who hope to keep all of the profits from the smuggling for themselves.
13	13	"Wolf and a New Beginning"; Transliteration: "Ōkami to Arata na Tabidachi" (Japanese: 狼と新たな旅立ち)	Keiji Kawakubo, Hidefumi Takagi & Takeo Takahashi	Takeo Takahashi	Sorato Shimizu, Yoshio Kosakai & Si Min Lee	March 26, 2008
Lawrence burns the ropes binding him and reunites with Holo. She refuses to tell him what she did to placate the wolves' wrath, and then chides him again for being too nice and protecting her clothes instead of running away on his own. After being told of Liebert's betrayal, Holo transforms into her true form. With Lawrence riding on her back, she catches up with their betrayers and Nora, who is still oblivious about the betrayal and their plan to murder her. Holo routs the men but spares Liebert, who reveals that Lemerio betrayed them at the very beginning because the gold procured was only one-sixth of the intended profit. Lawrence uses this information to blackmail Lemerio, extorting five hundred Lumione gold coins over a period of ten years. Lawrence does, however, allow them to keep and use the smuggled gold to save the company from bankruptcy. After reassuring Holo of his devotion, Lawrence continues on his journey with her.

=== Season 2 (2009) ===
No. overall	No. in season	Title	Directed by	Storyboarded by	Animation directed by	Original release date
14	0	"Wolf and Amber Melancholy"; Transliteration: "Ōkami to Kohakuiro no Yūutsu" (Japanese: 狼と琥珀色の憂鬱)	Hideki Tonokatsu	Takeo Takahashi	Toshimitsu Kobayashi	April 30, 2009 (OVA) (Note: Episode 14 never aired on television; it was released as an original video animation with a picture book entitled Spice and Wolf: Wolf and Gold Wheat published by ASCII Media Works in Japan.)
Kraft Lawrence, Holo, and Nora sit down to have dinner together, but Holo's animosity toward Nora prevents her from enjoying it. Later, Holo falls ill due to fatigue and is forced to rest for a few days. She dreams and reminisces about her past and her journey so far with Lawrence, realizing her affection for him is intensifying. Lawrence also feels the same for Holo as he treats her fever and fatigue by feeding her and balancing the four humors. Over the course of her sickness, Holo grows closer to Lawrence, but Holo's aversion to Nora continues to cause problems. Nora visits Holo, however, and makes amends as they share a joke at Lawrence's expense and finally become friends.
15	1	"Wolf and the Inadvertent Rift"; Transliteration: "Ōkami to Futoshita Kiretsu" (Japanese: 狼とふとした亀裂)	Ikuo Yamakado	Takeo Takahashi	Takuji Yoshimoto & Ikuo Yamakado	July 9, 2009
Lawrence and Holo travel to Kumersun, where a pagan festival is taking place. Upon arrival, they meet Fermi Amarti, a young merchant and Lawrence's fellow member of the Rowen Trading Guild. Amarti, who has apparently fallen in love with Holo at first sight, helps them get a room in the guild. However, Holo drinks too much on the first night and gets a hangover the following morning, during which Lawrence sells iron nails in his cart to Marc Cole, wheat seller and friend. That night, Lawrence asks Holo a few questions about towns neighboring Yoitsu and ascertains that it will probably take another year or two to reach it. Lawrence suggests that they can split up once they reach the town of Nyohhira, since it would only take Holo two days to reach Yoitsu from there, but he immediately regrets his lack of tact, which made Holo feel slightly disappointed.
16	2	"Wolf and the Calm Before the Storm"; Transliteration: "Ōkami to Arashi no Mae no Seijaku" (Japanese: 狼と嵐の前の静寂)	Tomokazu Tokoro	Takeo Takahashi	Yoshitasuku Hatano	July 16, 2009
Instead of taking Holo to the festival as planned, Lawrence is taken by fellow merchant Gi Batos to meet Dian "Diana" Rubens, a chronicler, to learn more about Yoitsu. She tells Lawrence of a legend about the moon-hunting bear that destroyed Yoitsu and also of a large wolf near the town of Lenos who called herself Holo of Yoitsu. Later when sharing a drink with Marc, Lawrence becomes jealous of Amarti, fearing he may be trying to steal Holo away from him. When they both return to the inn, Holo reveals how she lied to Amarti, telling him she travels with Lawrence because she owes him a large debt. She also recounts how Amarti and a crowd of other festival-goers haggled over pieces of pyrite, greatly inflating their price. Marc Cole's apprentice suddenly arrives at the inn and tells Lawrence something, prompting Lawrence to alarmingly sprint out of the inn.
17	3	"Wolf and the Gap that Cannot be Filled"; Transliteration: "Ōkami to Umaranai Mizo" (Japanese: 狼と埋まらない溝)	Shinsuke Terasawa	Takeo Takahashi	Takuji Yoshimoto & Kanji Nagasaka	July 23, 2009
In front of the Rowen Trading Guild, Amarti challenges Lawrence, proclaiming he will pay for Holo's falsified debt of one thousand Trenni silver coins and then propose to her, certain that she will leave Lawrence. Becoming desperate and realizing his true feelings for Holo, Lawrence researches Amarti, discovering that his plan to pay back the debt relies on the sale of pyrite. Back at the inn, Holo reads a letter for Lawrence containing an explanation of the legend about the moon-hunting bear that destroyed Yoitsu. When Lawrence returns, she claims that he knew Yoitsu was destroyed the entire time and he has now grown tired of her. Although Lawrence tries to explain to her that she means more to him than anything else, a tearful and heartbroken Holo asks him to make love to her, so that he can prove to her he genuinely does love her. When Lawrence resists, Holo snaps and disowns him, prompting him to leave the inn.
18	4	"Wolf and the End of Shallow Thinking"; Transliteration: "Ōkami to Asajie no Matsuro" (Japanese: 狼と浅知恵の末路)	Ikuo Yamakado	Hideki Tonokatsu	Ikuo Yamakado	July 30, 2009
Lawrence realizes that he has to drop the price of pyrite or risk losing Holo to Amarti, especially after seeing her signature on Amarti's marriage proposal, meaning she has accepted. After receiving the information on Amarti's assets, Lawrence finds Amarti and proposes a deal based on credit (essentially, naked shorting on pyrite), which will result in profit for Amarti if the price of pyrite rises or losses if the price of pyrite falls. Amarti accepts the deal after Lawrence appeals to his chivalry and causes him to doubt that Holo will agree to his marriage proposal. Unable to enlist Marc's help to purchase the pyrite necessary to pull off the deal, Lawrence turns to the alchemists in the belief that they should have a large amount of pyrite that he can purchase.
19	5	"Wolf, Hope and Despair"; Transliteration: "Ōkami to Kibō to Zetsubō" (Japanese: 狼と希望と絶望)	Toshikatsu Tokoro	Tomokazu Tokoro	Toshiya Washida	August 6, 2009
To gain access to the alchemists' quarter, Lawrence asks Batos for a password to meet Diana. Upon his arrival, Lawrence is told that the pyrite has already been sold on credit. Diana, however, agrees to sell Lawrence pyrite instead and tells him that she will handle negotiations and contact him upon their completion. The next morning, Lawrence goes to the exchange with Amarti and receives fourteen Lumione gold coins, equivalent to five hundred Trenni silver coins, in accordance with their deal. The price of pyrite continues rising, worrying Lawrence.
20	6	"Wolf and Trustworthy God"; Transliteration: "Ōkami to Shinzubeki Kami" (Japanese: 狼と信ずべき神)	Shinsuke Terasawa	Takeo Takahashi	Jōji Yanase	August 13, 2009
Lawrence participates in the pyrite market, selling small quantities several times to combat the rapidly rising prices, but to no avail. Lawrence's original plan falls through when Diana's messenger informs him that the negotiations did not go as planned. In despair, Lawrence all but gives up before he is spurred on by Marc's apprentice, Eu Landt. When Lawrence goes to sell his remaining pyrite, Holo also sells a large bag purchased from Diana, revealing that she was attempting to help Lawrence from the beginning. The market quickly turns to selling, dropping the price of pyrite and causing Amarti huge losses. He is left devastated as he fails to fulfill his portion of his challenge to Lawrence and forces himself to give up his marriage proposal to Holo as a result. Holo and Lawrence realize what they mean to one another and the two grow closer as they decide to continue traveling together to find Yoitsu.
21	7	"Wolf and Playful Days"; Transliteration: "Ōkami to Tawamure no Hibi" (Japanese: 狼と戯れの日々)	Hijiri Sanpei	Hiroyuki Shimazu	Kyoko Kametani	August 20, 2009
Lawrence and Holo make their way to the chilly port town of Lenos, known for its wood and fur. As he enters the town, Lawrence is given a tablet to identify him as a foreign merchant, allowing him to trade in the town. Intrigued by the town's history and legends, Lawrence decides to investigate. They settle into the local inn, where the innkeeper, named Aroldo Eklund, tells them about people who may be able to help them, including a man named Rigoro Deidre, a scribe of the Church, who was part of a strange gathering witnessed by Lawrence and Holo upon entering the town. They also meet a mysterious cloaked stranger, who Lawrence mistakes as male. Holo corrects him and jokingly chides him for having eyes for another woman.
22	8	"Wolf and an Enchanting Traveler"; Transliteration: "Ōkami to Kowakuteki na Tabibito" (Japanese: 狼と蠱惑的な旅人)	Shunsuke Machitani	Masaki Watanabe	Mi Sun Nam & Hitoshi Morikawa	August 27, 2009
Lawrence and Holo visit the port in Lenos, where they sit down for a meal. Holo uses her sharp senses and informs Lawrence that foreign fur merchants are unable to sell their wares, resulting in some unrest. However, she becomes inebriated from the meal and has to rest. Lawrence, meanwhile, visits a local bar to gather information from a hostess named Helena and learns that the entire town is on edge due to some issues with the fur trade. After dinner, Lawrence goes to talk with the Aroldo but is interrupted by the arrival of the mysterious cloaked stranger, who introduces herself as Eve Boland. She and Lawrence briefly chat, and she tells him that they should chat further if their interests coincide.
23	9	"Wolf and Reckless Negotiation"; Transliteration: "Ōkami to Mubō na Shōdan" (Japanese: 狼と無謀な商談)	Yo Miura	Shinsuke Terasawa	Kenji Matsuoka	September 3, 2009
Lawrence and Holo go to see Rigoro and are at first awed by the magnificent garden in a large greenhouse behind his house. Rigoro brings them downstairs where Holo picks out a few books containing old legends from the north for Lawrence to carry back. Lawrence and Holo spend an enjoyable night together, though Holo later confesses that she is afraid of being separated from Lawrence at the journey's end. After Holo goes to sleep, Lawrence chats with Aroldo and Eve about her business ventures, but she surprises him by asking whether he would like to sell Holo.
24	10	"Wolf and Lonely Smile"; Transliteration: "Ōkami to Kodoku na Hohoemi" (Japanese: 狼と孤独な微笑み)	Hisatoshi Shimizu	Tomokazu Tokoro	Toshiya Washida	September 10, 2009
Eve explains to Lawrence that they will sell Holo to gain cash, which they will then use to buy the fur in town. The fur will then be sold in turn at a profit, and Holo will be bought back. After Lawrence explains it to Holo, she also agrees to the plan, hoping Lawrence will be more selfish and use the profit to achieve his dream. Later, Lawrence's digging around town reveals that Eve is trading in salt and that the Church in town is aiming to become more powerful in the region. Eve had a disagreement with the bishop but Lawrence and Holo resolve to go with Eve's plan nonetheless.
25	11	"Wolf and the Decision to Part"; Transliteration: "Ōkami to Wakare no Ketsui" (Japanese: 狼と別れの決意)	Toshikatsu Tokoro	Takeo Takahashi	Shigenori Taniguchi & Sorato Shimizu	September 17, 2009
Ruzz Elingin, a representative of the Derink Trading Company, proposes to purchase Holo with sixty Lumione gold coins instead of two thousand Trenni silver coins because of their inability to procure the necessary silver, and Lawrence agrees to the deal. While celebrating the deal, Eve reveals she had been purchased and married to a merchant. She tells Lawrence and Holo to cherish their experiences together. Back at the inn, Holo suggests they should end their journey after she is sold since Lawrence has almost realized his dream of becoming a shop owner, and Lawrence's efforts to dissuade her fail, leaving him heartbroken. The next morning, they return the books borrowed from Rigoro, pausing to converse with Merta, a nun residing in Rigoro's home working as a librarian. Suddenly, Eve arrives and says there has been a coup d'état, leaving them surrounded by a rebellion.
26	12	"Wolf and Endless Tears"; Transliteration: "Ōkami to Tomedonaki Namida" (Japanese: 狼ととめどなき涙)	Hijiri Sanpei	Takeo Takahashi	Shinya Ojiri, Shigenori Taniguchi, Sorato Shimizu, Masayuki Tanaka & Hyo Sang Yoo	September 24, 2009
Even in light of the chaos caused by the coup d'état, Lawrence and Eve decide to continue with their plan. While Eve goes to reserve a ship, Lawrence leaves Holo with the traders and receives the gold according to the deal. However, when he meets with Eve in the inn, Lawrence decides to pull out. Eve threatens to murder him, since he discovered Eve had a cunning plan involving the Church to earn a huge amount of money. Eve knocks him out, but leaves him a deed to an inn, which he then uses to buy back Holo. In the face of Holo's apparent fury, Lawrence declares his decision to forgo his dream and keep traveling with Holo as well as confessing his crush for her. After this, Holo hints at the fact that she may have fallen for or is falling for Lawrence as well. They then proceed to the dock in the midst of all the chaos and prepare to board, ready to start anew together.

== See also ==
- List of Spice and Wolf: Merchant Meets the Wise Wolf episodes (2024 series)
- List of Spice and Wolf light novels
- List of Spice and Wolf chapters
