= List of Spice and Wolf chapters =

The cover of the first volume of the Spice and Wolf manga released by ASCII Media Works.

Spice and Wolf is a Japanese manga series written by Isuna Hasekura and illustrated by Keito Koume, with collaboration from Jū Ayakura. Based on the light novel series of the same name, the series follows Kraft Lawrence, a traveling merchant, who meets and begins traveling with a pagan wolf-deity named Holo after he unintentionally frees her from the village she has been bound to for hundreds of years. As they make their way up north to Holo's birthplace, they engage in trade to obtain enough profit so that Lawrence may realize his dream of settling down and opening his own shop one day. At the same time, they must deal with the hazards of business and evade the attention of the Church.

The manga is serialized monthly in ASCII Media Works' seinen manga magazine Dengeki Maoh since November 2007. As of April 2011, the chapters have been collected in ten tankōbon volumes in Japan. Yen Press licensed the manga series at New York Comic Con 2009, and began releasing the series in English in North America starting in 2009. It has been published in Polish by Studio JG and in Chinese by Kadokawa Media in Taiwan and by Kadokawa Intercontinental in Hong Kong starting in August 2008.

== Volume list ==
| No. | Original release date | Original ISBN | English release date | English ISBN |
|---|---|---|---|---|
| 01 | March 27, 2008 | 978-4-8402-4254-7 | April 20, 2010 | 978-0-316-07339-4 |
Chapters 1-6
Kraft Lawrence, a traveling merchant, arrives in the town of Pasloe just as the traditional harvest festival begins. While resting outside the town, he discovers Holo, Pasloe's harvest deity, in his cart. Holo persuades Lawrence to take her back to her home in the north. While resting at a church, a young merchant named Zheren approaches Lawrence and tells him about a profitable scheme involving the purity of silver coins, though Holo senses that Zheren is lying. After reaching the next town, Pazzio, and selling his load of furs at the Milone Company, Lawrence (with Holo's help) figures out the motive behind Zheren's scheme, and how he can profit from it.
| 02 | January 27, 2009 | 978-4-04-867559-8 | July 27, 2010 | 978-0-316-10232-2 |
Chapters 7-12; Bonus Track
Lawrence and Holo return to the Milone Company to enlist their help in profiting from Zheren's scheme. Later, men from the Medio Company, which is working with Zheren, try to ambush Lawrence and Holo. Holo acts as a decoy, allowing Lawrence to reach the Milone Company. Lawrence negotiates with the Milone Company, persuading them to help him rescue Holo. After freeing Holo, Lawrence learns that his friend from Pasloe, Yarei, is also working with the Medio Company, and plans to hand Holo over to the church to prevent the Milone Company from interfering with their scheme. With Yarei and the Medio Company searching for them, Lawrence and Holo attempt to escape through the sewers of Pazzio.
| 03 | July 27, 2009 | 978-4-04-867963-3 | November 30, 2010 | 978-0-316-10234-6 |
Chapters 13-18; Bonus Track
As the Medio Company's men and Yarei close in on them, Lawrence and Holo try to find their way out of Pazzio. Lawrence is stabbed by one of the pursuers, and the two are soon cornered. Yarei attempts to convince Lawrence to hand Holo over, but he refuses. As the Medio men prepare to kill Lawrence, Holo transforms into her true form - a giant wolf - and defeats them. However, Lawrence's fear of Holo's true form hurts her, and she abandons him as he loses consciousness. He awakens at the Milone Company, where he receives his share of the profits from the scheme in pepper and reconciles with Holo. Later, they travel to Poroson, the next town, to sell the pepper at the Latparron Company.
| 04 | March 27, 2010 | 978-4-04-868516-0 | May 31, 2011 | 978-0-316-17826-6 |
Chapters 19-24; Bonus Track
At the Latparron Company, Holo uncovers the shop owner's plan to swindle Lawrence. In exchange for not exposing the owner's dishonesty, Lawrence persuades the owner to sell him a large load of armor on margin (meaning that he is in debt to the company until he sells the armor). While en route to Ruvenheigen, the travelers meet Norah Arendt, a young shepherdess, who convinces Lawrence to hire her to protect them from wolves, despite Holo's objections. After going their separate ways at the Ruvenheigen city wall, Lawrence goes to the Remelio Company to sell his armor, where he learns that the armor's price has crashed and that he is now deeply in debt.
| 05 | October 27, 2010 | 978-4-04-868921-2 | October 25, 2011 | 978-0-316-19447-1 |
Chapters 25-30; Bonus Track
The Remelio Company demands that Lawrence repay his debt in two days or face bankruptcy. After unsuccessfully trying to get other merchants to lend him money, Lawrence blames Holo for his failure in a moment of desperation, and she leaves him, returning to the inn. Afterwards, Lawrence tries to apologize to Holo, who lashes out at him for not being angry at her. After they reconcile, Holo devises a plan to smuggle gold into the city by carrying it in the stomachs of Norah's sheep, and the two persuade the Remelio Company and Norah to participate. The next day, Lawrence, Holo, and Norah set off to Lamtra with Liebert (the Remelio Company's representative) and acquire the gold, but are attacked by wolves on the return trip.
| 06 | April 4, 2011 | 978-4-04-870500-4 | March 27, 2012 | 978-0-316-21032-4 |
Chapters 31-35; Bonus Track
Holo tells the others, including Lawrence, to leave her behind, so that she can deal with the wolves. Afterwards, while waiting for Holo, Lawrence is attacked and bound by three men from the Remelio Company, who plan to kill Norah and keep the proceeds from the smuggling for themselves. Lawrence frees himself and finds Holo, and tells her of their betrayal. Holo transforms into her true form, takes Lawrence on her back, and catches up with Liebert and the Remelio men, ravaging them before they can kill Norah. After taking the gold from Liebert and giving it to Norah, Lawrence goes to the Remelio Company with Holo, where they blackmail the owner into buying the gold from them for 500 gold coins - enough to cover Lawrence's debt. Later, Lawrence and Holo reunite with Norah, who has successfully brought the gold into the city.
| 07 | February 27, 2012 | 978-4-04-886294-3 | November 20, 2012 | 978-0-316-22911-1 |
Chapters 36-41
Holo and Lawrence visit a church in Tereo, a small northern village, hoping to meet a priest that might have information about Yoitsu, Holo's birthplace. Upon arrival, Elsa, the deaconess, tells them of the priest's recent death and sends them away. Elsa is in fact the priest's daughter, and is locked in a dispute with Enberch, the neighboring town, which seeks to take advantage of her father's death to regain control of Tereo. Lawrence and Holo later manage to persuade Elsa to let them read her father's writings, but their study is interrupted when Tereo is accused of selling poisoned wheat to Enberch - a ploy to force Tereo to submit to Enberch's control. Facing threats from the townspeople, who blame them for poisoning the wheat, Lawrence, Holo, Elsa, and Evan (the town's miller) are forced to escape. However, while on the run, Lawrence realizes that, with Holo's help, Tereo can be saved.
| 08 | October 27, 2012 | 978-4-04-891051-4 | June 25, 2013 | 978-0-316-25085-6 |
Chapters 42-47
| 09 | August 27, 2013 | 978-4-04-891839-8 | September 23, 2014 | 978-0-316-29487-4 |
Chapters 48-54
| 10 | April 26, 2014 | 978-4-04-866488-2 | December 16, 2014 | 978-0-316-33660-4 |
Chapters 55-61
| 11 | December 20, 2014 | 978-4-04-869054-6 | September 22, 2015 | 978-0-316-30505-1 |
Chapters 62-67
| 12 | August 27, 2015 | 978-4-04-865172-1 | March 22, 2016 | 978-0-316-31476-3 |
Chapters 68-74
| 13 | February 27, 2016 | 978-4-04-865725-9 | July 18, 2017 | 978-0-316-44030-1 |
Chapters 75-80
| 14 | September 27, 2016 | 978-4-04-892341-5 | November 7, 2017 | 978-0-316-44265-7 |
Chapter 81-86
| 15 | May 27, 2017 | 978-4-04-892911-0 | March 27, 2018 | 978-1-9753-0011-1 |
Chapters 87-92
| 16 | February 27, 2018 | 978-4-04-893596-8 | December 11, 2018 | 978-1-9753-2799-6 |
Chapters 93-99

== See also ==
- Spice and Wolf
- List of Spice and Wolf light novels
- List of Spice and Wolf episodes (2008 series)
- List of Spice and Wolf: Merchant Meets the Wise Wolf episodes (2024 series)
