= S&W =

S&W may refer to:

- S&W Cafeteria, a defunct restaurant chain in North Carolina, United States
- S&W Premium, a brand of canned fruit by Del Monte Foods
- Schwartz & Wade, an imprint of the publisher Random House
- Smith & Wesson, a U.S. firearms manufacturer
- Spice and Wolf, a Japanese light novel series by Isuna Hasekura.
- The Elements of Style, a guide to written American English by William Strunk Jr. and E. B. White
