= List of Spice and Wolf: Merchant Meets the Wise Wolf episodes =

Key visual for the series

Spice and Wolf: Merchant Meets the Wise Wolf is an anime television series based on the light novel series Spice and Wolf written by Isuna Hasekura and illustrated by Jū Ayakura. The story follows a 25-year-old traveling merchant named Kraft Lawrence who meets Holo, a female wolf deity of harvest. Holo, bound to a nearby town by an old promise to ensure a good wheat harvest every year, escapes with Lawrence when the townspeople stop believing in her. Lawrence promises to take her north to her homeland, Yoitsu, while she helps him with his business transactions along the way in return.

A new anime adaptation was announced in February 2022, as part of the light novel's 15-year anniversary. It was later confirmed to be an anime series remake, titled Spice and Wolf: Merchant Meets the Wise Wolf, produced by Passione and directed by Hijiri Sanpei, with Takeo Takahashi returning from the previous adaptation as chief director, Kevin Penkin composing the music, and both Jun Fukuyama and Ami Koshimizu returning to reprise their roles as Lawrence and Holo respectively. The series aired from April 2 to September 24, 2024, on TV Tokyo and its affiliates. (Note: TV Tokyo lists the series premiere as airing on April 1 at 25:30, which is effectively April 2 at 1:30 a.m. JST) The first opening theme song is "Tabi no Yukue" (旅のゆくえ; lit. 'Journey's Destination') performed by Hana Hope, while the first ending theme song is "Andante" (アンダンテ) performed by ClariS. The second opening theme song is "Sign" performed by Aimer, while the second ending theme song is "Ringo to Kimi" (りんごと君; lit. The Apple and You) performed by NeRiAme. Crunchyroll licensed the series outside of Asia. In March 2024, Netflix announced that it would be streaming the series in select Asian regions.

Following the first-season finale, a second season was announced. It is set to premiere in January 2027.

== Episodes ==
=== Season 1 (2024) ===
No. overall	No. in season	Title	Directed by (Note: Production staff information is taken from the ending credits of each episode)	Written by	Storyboarded by	Original release date
1	1	"The Harvest Festival and The Crowded Driver's Box"; Transliteration: "Shūkaku-sai to Semaku Natta Gyosha-dai" (Japanese: 収穫祭と狭くなった御者台)	Mitsuki Kitamura	Tatsuhiko Urahata	Takeo Takahashi	April 2, 2024
2	2	"Mischievous Wolf and No Laughing Matter"; Transliteration: "Itazura Ōkami to Waraenai Jōdan" (Japanese: いたずら狼と笑えない冗談)	Akifumi Komori	Tatsuhiko Urahata	Hijiri Sanpei	April 9, 2024
3	3	"Port Town and Sweet Temptation"; Transliteration: "Minatomachi to Amai Yūwaku" (Japanese: 港町と甘い誘惑)	Tatsuya Hagino	Tatsuhiko Urahata	Shinji Itadaki	April 16, 2024
4	4	"Romantic Merchant and Moonlit Festival"; Transliteration: "Yumemi-ga China Shōnin to Tsuki Akari no Wakare" (Japanese: 夢見がちな商人と月明りの別れ)	Shunichi Kato	Tatsuhiko Urahata	Hijiri Sanpei	April 23, 2024
5	5	"Wolf Incarnate and Obedient Lamb"; Transliteration: "Ōkami no Kenshin to Jūjun na Kohitsuji" (Japanese: 狼の化身と従順な子羊)	Yū Yabuuchi	Tatsuhiko Urahata	Takeo Takahashi	April 30, 2024
6	6	"Merchant and Unreasonable God"; Transliteration: "Shōnin to Rifujin na Kami" (Japanese: 商人と理不尽な神)	Shunichi Kato	Tatsuhiko Urahata	Shinji Itadaki	May 7, 2024
7	7	"Scale of God and Sorcerer of the Grasslands"; Transliteration: "Kami no Tenbin to Sōgen no Majutsushi" (Japanese: 神の天秤と草原の魔術師)	Tatsuya Hagino	Yuki Nekota	Masayuki Sakoi	May 14, 2024
8	8	"Fellow Traveler and Foreboding News"; Transliteration: "Tabi no Michidzure to Fukitsu-na Shirase" (Japanese: 旅の道連れと不吉な知らせ)	Yūta Kida	Yukito Kizawa	Takeo Takahashi	May 21, 2024
9	9	"Sweet Honey and Bitter Armor"; Transliteration: "Amai Mitsu to Nigai Yoroi" (Japanese: 甘い蜜と苦い鎧)	Hiroki Moritomo	Yuki Nekoda	Shinji Itadaki	May 28, 2024
10	10	"Wisdom of a Wolf and Smooth Talk of a Merchant"; Transliteration: "Ōkami no Chie to Shōnin no Kuchiguruma" (Japanese: 狼の知恵と商人の口車)	Yū Yabuuchi	Yukito Kizawa	Takeo Takahashi	June 4, 2024
11	11	"Forest of Wolves and Frigid Rain"; Transliteration: "Ōkami no Mori to Itetsuku Ame" (Japanese: 狼の森と凍てつく雨)	Shunichi Kato, Takahiro Majima, Hironori Aoyagi & Yūta Kida	Yuki Nekoda	Takashi Sano	June 11, 2024
12	12	"Price of Betrayal and Price of Gold"; Transliteration: "Uragiri no Daika to Ōgon no Daika" (Japanese: 裏切りの代価と黄金の代価)	Tatsuya Hagino	Yukito Kizawa	Hiroko Kazui	June 18, 2024
13	13	"Supper of Three and Afternoon of Two"; Transliteration: "Sannin no Bansan to Futari no Gogo" (Japanese: 三人の晩餐と二人の午後)	Takashi Ikehata & Mitsuki Kitamura	Yukito Kizawa	Masae Nakayama	June 25, 2024
14	14	"New Town and Nostalgic Feeling"; Transliteration: "Atarashī Machi to Bōkyō no Omoi" (Japanese: 新しい町と望郷の思い)	Tatsuya Hagino	Yukito Kizawa	Takeshi Mori	July 2, 2024
15	15	"Bird Feather and Mysterious Ore"; Transliteration: "Tori no Hane ro Fushigina Kōseki" (Japanese: 鳥の羽と不思議な鉱石)	Yūta Kida	Yukito Kizawa	Takeshi Mori	July 9, 2024
16	16	"Night of the Festival and Misaligned Gear"; Transliteration: "Matsuri no Yoru to Kurutta Haguruma" (Japanese: 祭りの夜と狂った歯車)	Hiroki Moritomo	Yukito Kizawa	Masae Nakayama	July 16, 2024
17	17	"Traveling Merchant's Shallow Thinking and Town Merchant's Signboard"; Transliteration: "Gyōshōnin no Asadjie to Machi Shōnin no Kanban" (Japanese: 行商人の浅知恵と町商人の看板)	Satoshi Saga	Yukito Kizawa	Masae Nakayama	July 23, 2024
18	18	"Goods of Intent and Negotiation of Resolve"; Transliteration: "Ketsui no Tsumini to Kakugo no Kōshō" (Japanese: 決意の積荷と覚悟の交渉)	Shunichi Kato	Yukito Kizawa	Takeo Takahashi	July 30, 2024
19	19	"God's Unseen Hand and Wolf's Unseen Heart"; Transliteration: "Miezareru Kami no Te to Miezareru Ōkami no Kokoro" (Japanese: 見えざる神の手と見えざる狼の心)	Takashi Ikehata, Lee Ki-Chang, Hito Tadano, Hiroki Moritomo & Tatsuya Hagino	Yukito Kizawa	Hiroyuki Shimazu	August 13, 2024 (Note: Episode 19 was delayed for one week due to broadcasting of the 2024 Summer Olympics)
20	20	"Church Girl and Miller Boy"; Transliteration: "Kyōkai no Shōjo to Konahiki no Shōnen" (Japanese: 教会の少女と粉挽きの少年)	Tatsuya Hagino, Satoshi Saga, Hito Tadano, Miki Sorakubo & Vu Ngoc Tram	Yukito Kizawa	Takeo Takahashi	August 20, 2024
21	21	"Pagan Village and Priest's Contract"; Transliteration: "Itan no Mura to Shisai no Keiyaku" (Japanese: 異端の村と司祭の契約)	Mitsutaka Noshitani	Yukito Kizawa	Kenji Setō	August 27, 2024
22	22	"Church Teachings and Memories of Father"; Transliteration: "Kyōkai no Oshie to Chichi no Kioku" (Japanese: 教会の教えと父の記憶)	Hiroki Moritomo, Hito Tadano, Tatsuya Hagino & Shunichi Kato	Yukito Kizawa	Takeo Takahashi	September 3, 2024
23	23	"Orchestrated Catastrophe and Appropriate Retribution"; Transliteration: "Shikumareta Saika to Shikarubeki Mukui" (Japanese: 仕組まれた災禍としかるべき報い)	Cheng Xianfu	Yukito Kizawa	Hiroyuki Morita	September 10, 2024
24	24	"Path of the Snake God and Answer of the Wise Wolf"; Transliteration: "Hebi-shin no Michi to Ken Ōkami no Kotae" (Japanese: 蛇神の道と賢狼の答え)	Tatsuya Hagino, Hito Tadano, Miki Sorakubo & Vu Ngoc Tram	Yukito Kizawa	Hiroyuki Morita & Takashi Sano	September 17, 2024
25	25	"Miracle's Path and Journey's Continuation"; Transliteration: "Kiseki no Yukue to Tsudzuku Tabiji" (Japanese: 奇跡の行方と続く旅路)	Shunichi Kato, Mitsuki Kitamura, Hito Tadano, Daishō Miyagi & Takashi Ikehata	Yukito Kizawa	Takeo Takahashi	September 24, 2024

== See also ==
- List of Spice and Wolf episodes (2008 series)
- List of Spice and Wolf light novels
- List of Spice and Wolf chapters
