= Vividred Operation =

Japanese anime television series

- From left to right: Aoi Futaba, Rei Kuroki, Akane Isshiki, Wakaba Saegusa and Himawari Shinomiya.

ビビッドレッド・オペレーション (Bibiddoreddo Operēshon)
- Genre: Action, comedy-drama, science fiction
- Created by: Team Vivid
- Manga

Vividred Operation: The 4-koma Viviop
- Written by: Team Vivid
- Illustrated by: Kotamaru
- Published by: ASCII Media Works
- Magazine: Dengeki G's Magazine
- Original run: November 2012 – May 2014
- Volumes: 2
- Anime television series
- Directed by: Kazuhiro Takamura
- Produced by: Toshihiro Maeda; Kozue Kaneniwa; Tetsuya Endō; Takanori Koarai; Yōsuke Toba
- Written by: Hiroyuki Yoshino; Kazuhiro Takamura
- Music by: Hideyuki Fukasawa
- Studio: A-1 Pictures
- Licensed by: AUS: Madman Entertainment; NA: Aniplex of America
- Original network: MBS (Animeism), TBS, CBC, BS-TBS, RKB, Tokyo MX
- English network: SEA: Aniplus Asia Animax Asia
- Original run: January 11, 2013 – March 29, 2013
- Episodes: 12
- Manga
- Written by: Team Vivid
- Illustrated by: Keito Koume
- Published by: ASCII Media Works
- Magazine: Dengeki G's Magazine
- Original run: February 2013 – April 2014
- Volumes: 2
- Video game

Vividred Operation: Akane to Mayo-tto Operation!
- Developer: Banpresto
- Publisher: Bandai Namco Games
- Genre: Minigame
- Platform: PlayStation Network
- Released: March 28, 2013
- Video game

Vividred Operation: Hyper Intimate Power
- Developer: Banpresto
- Publisher: Bandai Namco Games
- Genre: Action
- Platform: PlayStation Network
- Released: June 20, 2013

Vividred Operation (Japanese: ビビッドレッド・オペレーション, Hepburn: Bibiddoreddo Operēshon) is a Japanese anime television series produced by A-1 Pictures and directed by Kazuhiro Takamura. The series aired in Japan between January and March 2013 and is licensed in North America by Aniplex of America. Two manga adaptations have been published by ASCII Media Works. A PlayStation 3 video game adaptation by Bandai Namco Games was released in June 2013.

== Plot ==
In the near future, an invention known as the Manifestation Engine (示現エンジン, Jigen Enjin) has solved all of the world's energy-related problems five years ago. This powerful machine creates energy from the sky and now lies in the center of an artificial, man-made island called Blue Island. On another such island named Izu Ōshima, a poor but happy girl named Akane Isshiki lives a peaceful life with her sister, Momo, and her grandfather, Kenjirou, a smart yet eccentric scientist who also invented the Manifestation Engine. Because of his invention, the world has entered a new era of peace.

However, this peace didn't last for long. Suddenly without warning, a transdimensional alien force known as the Alone (アローン, Arōn) attacked and invaded Earth. Their primary objective is to destroy the Manifestation Engine so that they can send the world into chaos. Despite human military forces hitting them with all they've got, they prove to be no match to the Alone's immense power. Just when all hope seems lost, Kenjirou gives Akane a special key which will allow her to access the Vivid System (ビビッドシステム, Bibiddo Shisutemu), the only thing that can defeat the Alone.

Now wearing a Palette Suit (パレットスーツ, Paretto Sūtsu) special warfare armor, and possessing abilities unlike anything she ever imagined, Akane fights to protect the world from the Alone. She also recruits her classmates Aoi Futaba, Wakaba Saegusa and Himawari Shinomiya to join her in the fight. However, a mysterious girl is planning secretly behind the scenes to sabotage their efforts of defeating the Alone.

== Characters ==
=== Main characters ===
Akane Isshiki (一色 あかね, Isshiki Akane)
Voiced by: Ayane Sakura
Akane is a second-year junior high school student who is living together with her little sister and grandfather in Izu Oshima. She works many part-time jobs to support her family in place of her mother and rides the world's only flying bike that was made by her grandfather. Bright, energetic, honest, carefree and very athletic, she does have an odd habit of putting mayonnaise on anything she eats. She is given the power to transform using the Vivid System, where she is adorned in red. Her main weapon is a boomerang called the Naked Rang (ネイキッドラング, Neikiddo Rangu). She has the ability to 'dock' with other Vivid users in order to become more powerful forms, activated by each girl kissing her on the forehead. She previously had a fear of heights following a factory explosion which killed her father and hospitalized her mother, but she overcame it in order to save Aoi.
Aoi Futaba (二葉 あおい, Futaba Aoi)
Voiced by: Rie Murakawa
Aoi is Akane's classmate and best friend. She comes to Oshima from Blue Island for medical treatment. She is the daughter of a wealthy family, and her parents are often too busy to visit Oshima. She gains access to the Vivid System around the same time as Akane, her color being blue. Her main weapon is a rocket powered hammer known as the Naked Impact (ネイキッドインパクト, Neikiddo Inpakuto). When docked with Akane, they combine into Vivid Blue (ビビッドブルー, Bibiddo Burū), possessing a powerful hammer several times the size of Aoi's Naked Impact. She was also able to use the Naked Rang as a jetpack after Akane was rendered unconscious by an Alone attack.
Wakaba Saegusa (三枝 わかば, Saegusa Wakaba)
Voiced by: Yuka Ōtsubo
Wakaba is a determined sword fighter and captain of New Oshima Academy's Female Kendo Club who use Natural Harmony Style as her fighting style. She is also a classmate of Akane's and is the president of her class. She is competitive and hates to lose, but she also loves cute things, most often shown by her doting on Momo and Himawari. She is a bit awkward because of her earnestness, and she often draws the short straw. She gains access to the Vivid System after resolving to fight alongside Akane, her color being green. Her main weapon is a sword known as the Naked Blade (ネイキッドブレード, Neikiddo Burēdo). When docked with Akane, they combine into Vivid Green (ビビッドグリーン, Bibiddo Gurīn), able to increase the size of Wakaba's Naked Blade.
Himawari Shinomiya (四宮 ひまわり, Shinomiya Himawari)
Voiced by: Aya Uchida
Himawari is a brilliant hacker and one of Akane's classmates. Following an incident when she was betrayed by a friend, she withdrew to her room and stopped coming to school, instead using a robotic camera to view classes. However, she soon starts coming back to classes after Akane helps her save a power plant, during which she gains access to the Vivid System, her color being yellow. She has a case of anthrophobia, and does not pay any attention to fashion or her appearance. She is a super hacker who favorites PCs and machines, enjoys factoryscapes and admires Kenjirou's work (hence her understanding of the Vivid System). Her main weapon is a set of remote controlled drones known as the Naked Collider (ネイキッドコライダー, Neikiddo Koraidā) that provide various functions such as creating reflective shields. When docked with Akane, they become Vivid Yellow (ビビッドイェロー, Bibiddo Yerō), making Himawari's Naked Collider more advanced.
Rei Kuroki (黒騎 れい, Kuroki Rei)
Voiced by: Maaya Uchida
Rei is a quiet girl in Akane's class who is often alone and does not speak to others except for class. She does however like animals and owns a parakeet named Piisuke. She comes from another world that was allegedly obliterated, along with her parents. She is approached by a mysterious black crow who allegedly promises her that she would be able to restore her world if she assists the Alone in destroying the Manifestation Engine. She possesses a black winged bow which she uses to fire glowing arrows into the Alone, giving them more powerful forms. She bears a mark of feathers on her neck, which indicates how many arrows she can fire, and she will allegedly disappear when she uses her last arrow. She also carries around a key that she considers very important. After Akane saves Rei from the grasps of the crow, she docks with her to become Vivid Red (ビビッドレッド, Bibiddo Reddo).

=== Supporting characters ===
Momo Isshiki (一色 もも, Isshiki Momo)
Voiced by: Asuka Ōgame
Momo is Akane's little sister. She is a fifth grader, and the one in charge of the Isshiki family finances. She is a reliable girl who is great at cooking, and always backs up her sister, often worrying when she goes into action.
Kenjirō Isshiki (一色 健次郎, Isshiki Kenjirō)
Voiced by: Masaki Terasoma
Kenjirō is Akane and Momo's grandfather and self-proclaimed mad scientist. He is one of the developers of the Manifestation Engine, but now he keeps a research lab in Izu Oshima and focuses on his inventions. He pours most of his money into his research, which is one reason why the Isshiki family is poor. He has stated that whilst he does own various patents, he chooses not to profit from them as atonement for the accident that occurred seven years ago. He is the developer of the Vivid System, which allows Akane and the others to fight against the Alone. However, as the result of an explosion that occurred upon completing the experiment, his mind has been transferred to the body of a stuffed otter named Uso-kun (うそくん), with his human body kept in the fridge for preservation.
Mizuha Amagi (天城 みずは, Amagi Mizuha)
Voiced by: Haruka Yamazaki
Mizuha is an officer of the National Defense Forces who becomes the homeroom teacher for Akane and the others.
Yūri Shijō (紫条 悠里, Shijō Yūri)
Voiced by: Mika Doi
Yūri is the management bureau head for the Manifestation Engine.
Mashiro Isshiki (一色 ましろ, Isshiki Mashiro)
Voiced by: Sakura Nakamura
Mashiro is Akane and Momo's mother who is currently hospitalized following a factory explosion seven years ago.

=== Antagonists ===
Crow (カラス, Karasu)
Voiced by: Mie Sonozaki
She acts as an intermediary between the Alone and Rei, who she manipulates into assisting the Alone in targeting the Manifestation Engine with the promises of restoring her destroyed world and reuniting her with her parents. She often punishes Rei for interacting with humans. In the last two episodes she transforms into an ultimate Alone, Fallen Angel.
Alone (アローン, Arōn)
The Alone are a mysterious alien force from another dimension that takes many different forms and whose mission is to destroy the Manifestation Engine which, due to it providing 95% of the world's energy, will send the world into chaos if destroyed. When shot with arrows created by Rei, they can evolve into more powerful forms that are tougher to defeat, often aided with electromagnetism. All Alone are capable of firing red lasers from around their body. The Alone are often mechanical or resemble sediments, usually based on basic abstract imagery.

== Media ==
=== Manga ===
A four-panel comic strip manga series, illustrated by Kotamaru and titled Vividred Operation: The 4koma Viviop (ビビッドレッド・オペレーション The 4コマ びびおぺ, Bibiddoreddo Operēshon: Za Yonkoma Bibiope), was serialized between the November 2012 and May 2014 issues of ASCII Media Works' Dengeki G's Magazine. The first tankōbon volume was released on July 27, 2013; the second volume was released on May 27, 2014. A second manga, illustrated by Keito Koume and titled Vividred Operation, was serialized between the May 2013 and April 2014 issues of Dengeki G's Magazine. Two volumes, the first containing chapters published before the serialization, were released between February 27, 2013, and April 26, 2014.

=== Anime ===
The anime series, produced by A-1 Pictures, aired in Japan between January 11 and March 29, 2013, and was simulcast on Crunchyroll and Hulu. The series is directed by Kazuhiro Takamura, who had also worked on Strike Witches, and is written by Hiroyuki Yoshino, with character designs by Takamura. Hidari and Redjuice (a member of Supercell) handled the show's concept design. The series was released on six Blu-ray Disc and DVD compilation volumes in Japan between March 27 and August 28, 2013. Aniplex of America released the series on subtitled DVD in North America on December 17, 2013.

The series makes use of six pieces of theme music: one opening theme and five ending themes. The opening theme is "Energy" by Earthmind. The first four ending themes are used for one episode each: "We Are One" by Ayane Sakura and Rie Murakawa for episode two, "Stereo Colors" by Ayane Sakura and Yuka Ōtsubo for episode three, "Stray Sheep Story" by Ayane Sakura and Aya Uchida for episode four, and "Arifureta Shiawase" (ありふれたしあわせ; "Everyday Happiness") by Maaya Uchida for episode five. The fifth ending theme, "Vivid Shining Sky" by Ayane Sakura, Rie Murakawa, Yuka Ōtsubo, Aya Uchida and Maaya Uchida, is used for episode six and onwards.

No.	Title	Original release date
1	"The First Operation" "Fāsuto Operēshon" (ファーストオペレーション)	January 11, 2013
In the near-future, the world's energy problems have been solved thanks to a scientific invention known as the Manifestation Engine which creates energy from the sky. On the island of Izu Oshima, Akane Isshiki is living a simple life with her sister, Momo, and her grandfather and creator of the engine, Kenjirou. As Akane eagerly awaits the arrival of her classmate, Aoi Futaba, who is traveling to the nearby Blue Island for treatment, she and Momo hear an explosion coming from their home and discover that Kenjirou has somehow switched bodies with a stuffed otter doll as the result of an experiment. Undeterred by his new form, Kenjirou gives Akane his latest invention, a strange key known as an Operation Key. She is informed that this is the key to accessing the Vivid System, which is the only thing that can fight against an alien race known as the Alone. Meanwhile, an Alone (Four Legged) is seen attacking Blue Island, where the Manifestation Engine is stored. As Aoi's transport craft is hit and crash lands on a ledge, Akane and Kenjirou rush to their location, but Akane is soon struck by her fear of heights that she gained due to a traumatic incident that occurred seven years ago. When Aoi starts to fall towards the sea, Akane overcomes her fear and dives after her. Her key soon glows and she is able to activate the Vivid System, granting her a suit called the Pallet Suit which prevents her and Aoi from falling. Kenjirou explains that this system is for Akane and Aoi to fight against the Alone.
2	"When Two Become One" "Kasanari Au Toki" (かさなり合う瞬間)	January 18, 2013
As Kenjirou instructs Akane and Aoi to undergo 'docking', Aoi receives her own Operation Key, allowing her to also transform using the Vivid System. Receiving weapons to go along with their new abilities, Akane and Aoi begin fighting against the Alone whilst protecting the innocent. Meanwhile, Kenjirou contacts the head of the Manifestation Engine's management bureau, Yuuri Shijō, in order to gain military support in assisting the girls in fighting the Alone. After knocking out the Alone's core and temporarily stopping its movement, Akane and Aoi attempt the Docking Operation, but it fails due to Aoi subconsciously rejecting the fusion in fear of having Akane read her memory. As Aoi worries about this, she thinks back to when she first became friends with Akane, who gave her a tomato on their first meeting. Meanwhile, a mysterious girl fires a glowing arrow into the Alone, bringing it back to life and changing it into a more powerful form. As the girls find their attacks ineffective against the Alone's new form, Aoi confesses to Akane that she actually hates tomatoes, which she didn't want her to learn through the docking. Akane tells her that she already knew about that, but admired her perseverance to eat them regardless and assures her they are best friends. Reconfirming their friendship, Akane and Aoi perform the Docking Operation, fusing together to become Vivid Blue and combining their strengths to destroy the Alone. The next day, as Akane, Aoi and Momo discover their school has been obliterated as a result of the battle, Mizuha Amagi, an officer for the National Defense Force, informs them they will be transferred to a new school.
3	"True Strength" "Hontō no Tsuyosa" (本当の強さ)	January 25, 2013
Akane, Aoi and Momo begin their first day at New Oshima Academy. En route to school, Akane's bike breaks down, forcing her to use the Vivid System in an effort to arrive on time. She ends up meeting kendo club member Wakaba Saegusa, who becomes shocked when Akane counters her sudden attack. After Akane and Aoi officially transfer into Wakaba's class, Wakaba chases after Akane demanding a rematch until she ends up bumping into Momo, deciding to take her to the nurse's office. As Wakaba and Momo get acquainted, Akane overhears how Wakaba wanted a rematch to prove she's the strongest. After her father tells her to consider what 'true strength' is, Wakaba formally challenges Akane to a serious kendo match, which reminds Wakaba of how fun kendo used to be for her. Just then, their match is interrupted by the appearance of a serpent-like Alone (Dragon). As Wakaba comes to realise what true strength is from watching Akane and Aoi fight, she asks to fight alongside them, allowing her to acquire her own Operation Key. As the mysterious girl powers up the Alone again, Akane and Wakaba dock to become Vivid Green and defeat the Alone.
4	"Promise" "Yakusoku" (約束)	February 1, 2013
Akane, Aoi and Wakaba's latest fight against an Alone (Hermit Crab) is observed by Himawari Shinomiya, a girl who spends her days confined to her room and participates in classes through a camera. Following the battle, Wakaba starts training Akane and Aoi so they can safely dock in battle. As the girls attend gym class, Himawari spots Kenjirou through her robot's camera as he investigates who's been hacking access to files on the Alone, before it is smashed by a wayward baseball hit by Akane. The girls go to Himawari's apartment to apologize, where Himawari asks to inspect Kenjirou, which Akane passes off as a stuffed toy named Uso. Noticing Himawari's interest for factories, the girls dress her up and take her to see one of them. Just then, the factory they are visiting is attacked by the Alone from the previous day, which had undergone an evolution. As the girls transform to defeat it, Himawari heads to the plant to shut it down, but soon gets caught up in a cave-in. Recalling how she was betrayed by her previous friend, which led to her to become a shut-in, Himawari is rescued by Akane, who kept her promise to come back for her. Touched by this, Himawari gains an Operation Key, joining the girls in their fight. After the mysterious girl powers up the Alone again, Akane docks with Himawari to become Vivid Yellow and defeats the Alone. Following the battle, Himawari decides to start attending classes before asking Kenjirou for his autograph.
5	"Another Key" "Mō Hitotsu no Kagi" (もう一つの鍵)	February 8, 2013
Akane tries to get to know her quiet classmate, Rei Kuroki, unaware that she is the one assisting the Alone. As Akane decides to follow Rei after school, she sees her save a child from a falling piece of construction. As Rei returns home, she is visited by a crow, who punishes her for saving the child via a mark on her neck, reminding her of her mission. That night, Rei goes on a mission to destroy the Manifestation Engine by herself, but is forced to abort when she is discovered by patrol robots. The next morning, Akane finds her washed up on the shore and takes her back to her place to help her recover. As Rei panics when she realises she has dropped a key precious to her, Akane is called into action as an Alone (Box) appears. Meanwhile Rei, who was promised by the crow that she would able to restore the world she came from and bring back her parents if she assisted the Alone, prepares to fire another arrow, but falls unconscious before she can do so. Returned to Akane's place again, Rei feels relieved when she is reunited with her key, which Akane and her friends helped search for, although she declines Akane's offer of being friends. Afterwards, Akane goes to the hospital to visit her mother, Mashiro, who assures her that Rei will open up to her someday.
6	"In Which Kenjirou Tries to Strengthen the Friendship Power of Akane and the Other Girls, But Things Get Out of Hand" "Kenjirō ga Akane-tachi no Yūjō Pawā o Kyōka Shiyō to suru kedo Tondemonai Koto ni Naru Hanashi" (健次郎があかね達の友情パワーを強化しようとするけどとんでもないことになる話)	February 15, 2013
Whilst Akane's class goes on a summer school field trip to Shikine Island, they are requested by Mizuha to turn in their Operation Keys for the duration of the trip. Unbeknownst to the girls, this is part of an experiment by Kenjirou to increase their 'friendship power'. To this end, he 'kidnaps' Rei and puts on a phony Alone alert, leading the girls towards an obstacle course of his design, filled with all sorts of traps. Not considered in his plan, however, was Rei escaping from her custody and assisting the girls in a not-so-subtle disguise. Not wanting to be deterred, Kenjirou brings out a large mech to confront the girls, but it is defeated thanks to the combined efforts of Akane and Rei. Afterwards, Momo gets Kenjirou to apologize for his deceit whilst the others thank Rei for her help.
7	"A Dream I Won't Give Up On" "Yuzurenai Negai" (ゆずれない願い)	February 22, 2013
After defeating an Alone (Lantern), Akane continues to struggle with her studies due to a lack of sleep. Mizuha tells her that she must do well on her next test or risk losing her part-time job. Upon deciding to help her out with a study session, Aoi, Wakaba and Himawari try to get Rei to join them, but she keeps refusing. Later that night, after receiving another harsh reminder of her objective from the crow, Rei learns about Akane's link with the Manifestation Engine's inventor. Learning this, Rei decides to accompany the others on their study session with Akane. Whilst investigating her home to find something of use, Rei comes across the fridge where Kenjirou's body is being preserved, though the gang are quick to cover this up. As Rei learns to grow accustomed to the others, she takes her leave when she is reminded of a certain wish. Just then, an electro-magnetic Alone (Pincushion) appears over Tokyo, shorting out every electrical device it passes by. Akane manages to destroy most of it with Vivid Yellow, but a fragment is hit by one of Rei's arrows, causing it to change form drastically (transforming into Cocoon) and launch an attack at Akane, shorting out her Pallet Suit's power and sending her plummeting towards the sea.
8	"Even More Brilliantly Than Today" "Kyō yori mo Azayaka ni" (今日よりも鮮やかに)	March 1, 2013
Akane is taken into intensive care whilst the Alone that attacked her wraps itself onto the Tokyo Skytree. Despite their wishes to stay by Akane's side, Aoi and the others are sent home to rest up. Discovering Akane's Naked Rang which hadn't disappeared when she lost her transformation, Aoi believes that Akane is still fighting. Whilst discussing how to fight against the Alone, they find their options limited since the girls are unable to dock without Akane, forcing the military to consider more drastic means. Later, Aoi runs into Rei, who tells her how forgiving Akane is to others. Strengthening their resolve to help Akane as much as they can, Aoi and the others decide to fight against the Alone, taking Akane's Naked Rang with them. Their plan to stop it before hatches is thwarted after Rei once again powers it up. As the Alone prepares to fire at Wakaba and Himawari, Akane's Naked Rang suddenly activates, giving Aoi a boost and allowing her to defeat the Alone. Akane soon makes a quick recovery from her injuries, much to the relief of Aoi and her friends.
9	"Clear; With Occasional Frivolity" "Hare Tokidoki Fuwafuwa" (晴れときどきふわふわ)	March 8, 2013
Wakaba decides to take Himawari shopping with her, putting her in a cute dress that starts attracting a lot of attention. When they are approached by a photographer wanting to photograph Himawari for a fashion magazine, Wakaba pushes her to give it a try, despite her lack of interest. When the photos get some good feedback, with the editors wanting her to go pro, Himawari gets upset at Wakaba when she books a shoot for a day when she promised to take her to see a factory. Himawari decides to attend the photo shoot on the condition that Wakaba be her servant for the day. However, she becomes panicked when she learns that the photographers changed her hairpins that Wakaba gave her whilst she was sleeping and starts searching the ocean for them. Thankfully, Wakaba had kept them safe for her and manages to return them to her. Just then, they are called in to fight an Alone (Seahorse) planning to charge into the Manifestation Engine from outside the Earth's atmosphere. Working together, Wakaba and Himawari manage to hold off the Alone's attacks long enough for Akane and Aoi to defeat it with Vivid Blue. After the battle, Himawari makes plans to have Wakaba hang out with her for a whole day whilst Rei, who was unable to power up the Alone in time, becomes more desperate.
10	"Light and Shadow" "Hikari to Kage to" (光と影と)	March 15, 2013
Rei decides to gamble on acting after the arrival of the next Alone. Meanwhile, owing to Himawari's analysis skills, Kenjirou figures out the source of the Alone's power-ups. The next morning, Rei goes to Akane's place to apologize for her behavior the other day and is invited to have dinner with her and Momo. Meanwhile, Kenjirou tells Yuuri about how the Alone are linked to the accident that occurred seven years ago. Rei enjoys the evening as she has dinner, takes a bath and spends the night, and hears from Akane as to why she wanted to become her friend, making a promise that they'll stay friends. The next day, after Rei goes off on her own and Akane and the others are informed of a strategy to pinpoint the source of the arrows, another Alone (Bacteriophage) appears, which Rei powers up with another arrow. Before she can fire anymore however, she is located by security droids and is forced to retreat, allowing Akane and Wakaba destroy the Alone. As Rei becomes cornered, she is discovered by Akane, both becoming shocked upon learning each other's identities. Jumping to the conclusion that Akane knew her identity from the start, Rei feels betrayed by Akane, believing her wishes of friendship to be a lie, before she is captured by the military.
11	"I Want You to Know How I Feel" "Tsutaetai Omoi" (つたえたい想い)	March 22, 2013
Rei is put under high security and Akane and the others are forbidden to talk with her, while Kenjirou deduces that she is from another world. Wanting to see Rei again and learn the true story, Aoi and the others decide to break into the facility where Rei is being held. Reaching the holding cell, Akane conveys her feelings to Rei, pushing through with her desire to get to know her better. As Rei eventually accepts Akane's feelings, the crow appears before them, revealing herself to represent the Alone. Rei reveals her world was destroyed by Manifestation energy, being told by the crow that she could bring it back if she destroyed the Manifestation Engine. The crow mentions that Rei served as a beacon to the Alone, who would've stopped coming if she was killed, but Kenjirou had protested about that, opting instead to simply keep her from being detected and avoiding a pitfall set up during the test of the Alone. However, the Alone decide no world should wield Manifestation Energy but themselves. Attacking the others, the crow reveals the Alone had no intention of reviving Rei's world before devouring her, absorbing her remaining arrows to evolve into her most powerful form, the most powerful Alone (Fallen Angel).
12	"Vividred Operation" "Bibiddoreddo Operēshon" (ビビッドレッド・オペレーション)	March 29, 2013
While the crow begins rampaging with her new-found power, Kenjirou deduces that Rei is still alive within the center of the Alone she has become. With the crow taking off to head towards the Manifestation Engine, Akane finds Rei's key, which she believes may hold the key to their victory. The crow arrives at Blue Island and starts draining energy from the Manifestation Engine, causing blackouts all over the world. Akane and the others soon arrive at the scene, with each girl giving their remaining suit power to help Akane break into the crow. Akane manages to reach Rei and together they dock to become Vivid Red, allowing them to overcome the crow's power and destroy her. After the battle, the mysterious being Kenjirou saw seven years ago appears, revealing Rei's world has been restored. Promising that they'll see each other again, Rei leaves Akane her scarf before heading back to her home. Some time after life returns to normal, Akane once again sees Rei.

=== Video games ===
A video game developed by Banpresto, Vividred Operation: Hyper Intimate Power, was released by Bandai Namco Games for the PlayStation 3 via the PlayStation Network on June 20, 2013. A minigame titled Vividred Operation: Mayonnaise Operation with Akane! (ビビッドレッド・オペレーション あかねとマヨっとオペレーション!, Vividred Operation: Akane to Mayo-tto Operation!) was released on the PlayStation Network on March 28, 2013.

== Reception ==
Carl Kimlinger of Anime News Network gave Vividred Operation a B+ based on the first six episodes, saying, "The series' execution makes it easy to enjoy the story's strengths and hard to hold its many, many weaknesses against it." Dan Barnett of UK Anime Network gave the first three episodes an 8 out of 10, calling it "not to be missed", although he noted that "Vividred can't seem to decide what kind of an audience it's going for and has instead diluted the experience by trying to go for all of them at once. The show sits in a bit of an odd place where it'll be too tame for the majority of the audience who loved Strike Witches, yet at the same time it's still too racy and male-friendly to appeal to the young girls who are traditionally the audience for magical girl shows."
