= Keito Koume =

Japanese manga artist and illustrator

Keito Koume (小梅けいと)
- Born: Japan
- Areas: Manga artist, Illustrator

Keito Koume (小梅けいと, Koume Keito) is a Japanese manga artist and illustrator. Koume studied at Kyoto University and has been drawing manga professionally since 2000. In addition to drawing series type manga, he also regularly produces erotic manga one-shots. He is best known as being the illustrator for the manga series Spice and Wolf, by Isuna Hasekura.

== Works ==
Manga

- War Does Not Have a Woman's Face
- The Pollinic Girls Attack!
- Kujibiki Unbalance
- Spice and Wolf
- Uta Kata
- Vividred Operation
- School Love Net

Games

- Cannonball: Neko Neko Machine Mō Race!
- Sapphism no Gensō
