= Rocky Chack =

Japanese band

- Origin: Japan
- Genres: J-pop
- Years active: 1998–2000; 2005–present
- Labels: Midi, Inc. (1998-2000); outgroup records (2000); FlyingDog (2006-)
- Members: Taro Yamashita (vocals); Noe Arima (vocals & keyboard)
- Past members: Ichiro Fujishima (bass); Tamaki Kosugi (drums); Ikuya Taira (guitar)

Rocky Chack (Japanese: ロッキー・チャック Rokkī Chakku, sometimes stylized as ROCKY CHACK) is a Japanese band founded in 1998 and composed of Taro Yamashita (as "Taro") and Noe Arima (as "noe").

== History ==
Rocky Chack was formed in 1998 as a 5-person band and signed under the label Midi, Inc. In 2000, the band left Midi and signed with outgroup records (a division of Sony Music). However, after their label dissolved in October 2000, the band was put on hiatus. In late 2005, Taro and noe announced they would continue the band as a duo, and has since released music under the Victor Entertainment FlyingDog label.

In 2006, Rocky Chack performed the ending songs to the Japanese anime series Zegapain, along with the ending songs of Spice and Wolf in 2008 and its sequel in 2009.

== Members ==
=== Current ===
- Taro (Vocals) - Taro Yamashita (山下太郎), Birthplace: Kitakyushu, Japan.
- noe (Vocals & Keyboard) - Noe Arima (有馬野絵), Birthplace: Tokyo, Japan.

=== Former ===
- Ichiro Fujishima (Bass)
- Tamaki Kosugi (Drums)
- Ikuya Taira (Guitar) - Left in 1999.

== Discography ==
=== Singles ===
Release date	Album	Label/Catalog Number	Tracklist	Notes
June 24, 1998	SMILE IN THE HOLE	Label: Midi; Catalog No.: MDCS-1012	3 songs: 1. SMILE IN THE HOLE; 2. NO MORE; 3. 長い日	
October 1, 1998	DAY AND NIGHT	Label: Midi; Catalog No.: MDCS-1016	3 songs: 1. DAY AND NIGHT; 2. ルビーギリスの恋人; 3. 昼と夜の日	
December 2, 1998	SNOW (スノウ)	Label: Midi; Catalog No.: MDCS-1019	3 songs: 1. SNOW; 2. GOOD NIGHT; 3. DREAMING OF THE STAR	
December 1, 1999	チェンジ (Change)	Label: Midi; Catalog No.: MDCS-1031	3 songs: 1. CHANGE; 2. ひまわり; 3. 僕のベッドはどこ?	
August 23, 2000	Let Me Fly (レットミーフライ)	Label: outgroup; Catalog No.: OGCO-5006	1 song: 1. Let me Fly	
May 24, 2006	リトルグッバイ _{(jp)} (Little Goodbye)	Label: Victor; Catalog No.: VICL-36058	4 songs: 1. リトルグッバイ; 2. and you 3. リトルグッバイ(w/o R.C.) (Instrumental); 4. and you(w/o R.C.) (Instrumental)	Zegapain Ending song
February 6, 2008	リンゴ日和 〜The Wolf Whistling Song _{(jp)} (Ringo Hiyori~The Wolf Whistling Song)	Label: FlyingDog/Victor; Catalog No.: VTCL-35014	4 songs: 1. リンゴ日和 ～The Wolf Whistling Song; 2. 生意気なぼくら; 3. リンゴ日和 ～The Wolf Whistling Song (w/o ROCKY CHACK) (Instrumental); 4. 生意気なぼくら (w/o ROCKY CHACK) (Instrumental)	Spice and Wolf Ending song
August 5, 2009	Perfect World _{(jp)}	Label: FlyingDog/Victor; Catalog No.: VTCL-35064	4 songs: 1. Perfect World; 2. 君と僕; 3. Perfect World (w/o R.C.) (Instrumental); 4. 君と僕 (w/o R.C.) (Instrumental)	Spice and Wolf II Ending song

=== Albums ===
Release date	Album	Label/Catalog Number	Tracklist	Notes
February 17, 1999	Smash Water People	Label: Midi; Catalog No.: MDCL-1341	13 songs: 1. Wicked Child; 2. ひまわり; 3. Alright; 4. ナッツベリーファーム; 5. ルビーギリスの恋人(アルバム･テイク); 6. 長い日(アルバム･バージョン); 7. インターミッション(インスト); 8. 君をのせて; 9. Smile In The Hole(アルバムミックス); 10. Over The World; 11. Sweet Home; 12. Snow「アルバム･バージョン」; 13. Day And Night	
September 20, 2000	Every day (エブリデイ)	Label: outgroup; Catalog No.: OGCO-1003	8 songs: 1. Let me Fly; 2. GOOD DAY; 3. Could you see?; 4. Summer Day; 5. 真夏の恋; 6. Spiritual rise 7. I remember 8. ONE DAY	
