= Spice and Wolf =

Japanese light novel series

- First light novel volume cover, featuring Holo

狼と香辛料 (Ōkami to Kōshinryō)
- Genre: Adventure; Fantasy; Romance
- Light novel
- Written by: Isuna Hasekura
- Illustrated by: Jū Ayakura
- Published by: ASCII Media Works
- English publisher: NA: Yen Press
- Imprint: Dengeki Bunko
- Original run: February 10, 2006 – present
- Volumes: 24
- Manga
- Written by: Isuna Hasekura
- Illustrated by: Keito Koume
- Published by: ASCII Media Works
- English publisher: NA: Yen Press
- Magazine: Dengeki Maoh
- Original run: September 27, 2007 – December 27, 2017
- Volumes: 16
- Anime television series
- Directed by: Takeo Takahashi
- Produced by: Tatsuya Ishiguro; Tomoko Suzuki; Naomi Tokuda; Masanobu Arakawa (I); Yūichi Matsunaga (I); Tomohiro Fujita (II)
- Written by: Naruhisa Arakawa
- Music by: Yuji Yoshino
- Studio: Imagin (I); Brain's Base (II); Marvy Jack (II)
- Licensed by: Crunchyroll
- Original network: CTC, KBS, SUN, Tokyo MX, TVA, tvk, TVS
- English network: NA: Funimation Channel
- Original run: January 9, 2008 – September 24, 2009
- Episodes: 24 + 2 OVAs
- Video game

Spice and Wolf: Holo's and My One Year
- Developer: ASCII Media Works
- Publisher: ASCII Media Works
- Genre: Business, Dating sim
- Platform: Nintendo DS
- Released: June 26, 2008
- Video game

Spice and Wolf: The Wind that Spans the Sea
- Developer: ASCII Media Works
- Publisher: ASCII Media Works
- Genre: Business, Dating sim
- Platform: Nintendo DS
- Released: September 17, 2009
- Light novel

Wolf and Parchment: New Theory Spice & Wolf
- Written by: Isuna Hasekura
- Illustrated by: Jū Ayakura
- Published by: ASCII Media Works
- English publisher: NA: Yen Press
- Imprint: Dengeki Bunko
- Original run: September 10, 2016 – present
- Volumes: 13
- Video game

Spice and Wolf VR
- Developer: Spicy Tails
- Genre: Visual novel, Virtual reality
- Platform: Windows, PlayStation 4, Nintendo Switch, Oculus Go, Oculus Quest
- Released: Windows, Oculus Go: WW: June 3, 2019; PlayStation 4, Nintendo Switch: WW: September 5, 2019; Oculus Quest: WW: November 14, 2019
- Manga

Wolf and Parchment: New Theory Spice & Wolf
- Written by: Isuna Hasekura
- Illustrated by: Hidori
- Published by: ASCII Media Works
- English publisher: NA: Yen Press
- Magazine: Dengeki Maoh
- Original run: May 27, 2019 – present
- Volumes: 2
- Video game

Spice and Wolf VR2
- Developer: Spicy Tails
- Genre: Visual novel, Virtual reality
- Platform: Windows, PlayStation 4, Nintendo Switch, Oculus Go, Oculus Quest
- Released: Windows, Oculus Go: WW: December 10, 2020; Nintendo Switch: WW: January 6, 2021; PlayStation 4: WW: February 4, 2021; Oculus Quest: WW: April 14, 2021
- Anime television series

Spice and Wolf: Merchant Meets the Wise Wolf
- Directed by: Takeo Takahashi (Note: Credited as Chief Director (総監督).); Hijiri Sanpei (Note: Credited as Director (監督) in Season 1, and Chief Director (総監督) in Season 2.); Nobuyoshi Nagayama (S2); Takahiro Majima (S2)
- Produced by: Shoichi Horita; Tomohisa Kondou; Mirai Yamauchi; Akihiro Sotokawa; Megumi Miyahara
- Written by: Tatsuhiko Urahata (Note: Credited as Series composition (シリーズ構成, Shirīzu kōsei) for Cour 1 of Season 1 only.); Yukito Kizawa (Note: Credited as Series composition (シリーズ構成, Shirīzu kōsei) for Cour 2 of Season 1 only.); Yuki Nekota
- Music by: Kevin Penkin
- Studio: Passione
- Licensed by: Crunchyroll; Netflix (Note: Selected regions in Asia.)
- Original network: TV Tokyo, TVO, TVA, BS TV Tokyo, AT-X
- Original run: April 2, 2024 – present
- Episodes: 25
- icon

Spice and Wolf (Japanese: 狼と香辛料, Hepburn: Ōkami to Kōshinryō) is a Japanese light novel series written by Isuna Hasekura and illustrated by Jū Ayakura. ASCII Media Works has published 24 volumes since February 2006 under their Dengeki Bunko imprint. ASCII Media Works has also published thirteen volumes of a spin-off light novel series titled Wolf and Parchment since September 2016. The story follows Kraft Lawrence, a traveling merchant, and Holo, a wolf deity who decides to accompany him north to her hometown as Lawrence seeks his fortune.

A manga adaptation illustrated by Keito Koume began serialization in the November 2007 issue of ASCII Media Works' seinen manga magazine Dengeki Maoh. The manga is licensed by Yen Press, which has begun releasing the volumes in English. A 12-episode anime adaptation aired between January and March 2008, and an original video animation (OVA) episode released in May 2008. A second OVA was released in April 2009 as a prequel to the second anime season Spice and Wolf II, which had 12 episodes air between July and September 2009. Both anime seasons were released in English by Kadokawa Pictures USA and Funimation Entertainment. Two visual novels based on the series for the Nintendo DS were released by ASCII Media Works in June 2008 and September 2009. A second anime television series adaptation aired from April to September 2024, with a second season set to premiere in January 2027.

By October 2020, the light novel had sold over 5 million copies. The series was described as a "unique fantasy" by Mainichi Shimbun due to the plot focusing on economics and trade rather than typical fantasy staples such as swords and magic.

== Plot ==
Spice and Wolf's story revolves around Kraft Lawrence, a 25-year-old traveling merchant who peddles various goods from town to town to make a living in a fictional world similar to Medieval Europe. His main goal in life is to gather enough money to start his own shop, and he already has been traveling for seven years while gaining experience in the trade. One night, while at the town of Pasloe, he finds in his wagon a beautiful wolf-deity named Holo who is over 600 years old. She introduces herself as the town's goddess of harvest, who has kept it blessed with good harvests of wheat for many years. Holo has experienced increasing isolation and disillusionment at the townpeople's move away from her blessings towards their own methods of increasing the harvest.

Because of these changes, she wants to go back to her homeland in the north called Yoitsu, which draws parallels to the legendary land of Hyperborea. Holo also wants to travel to see how the world has changed while she has remained in Pasloe. She manages to bargain her way out of the village by making a deal with Lawrence to take her with him. As they travel, her wisdom helps increase his profits, but at the same time, her true nature draws unwanted attention from the Church. Meanwhile, the two find themselves slowly developing feelings for each other.

== Characters ==
Kraft Lawrence (クラフト・ロレンス, Kurafuto Rorensu)
Voiced by: Jun Fukuyama (2008 and 2024) (Japanese); J. Michael Tatum (2008 and 2024) (English)
A 25-year-old traveling merchant. His goal in life is to gather enough money to start his own shop. He meets Holo one night and eventually agrees to her traveling with him. She helps him by providing her wisdom which helps to increase his profits and get him out of difficult situations. As the series progresses, both Lawrence and Holo demonstrate a growing affection toward each other.
Holo (Note: Concerning the spelling of Holo's name, Yen Press has stated that they "were instructed that the proper spelling of the character's name is indeed Holo" by the Japanese licensor.) (ホロ, Horo)
Voiced by: Ami Koshimizu (2008 and 2024) (Japanese); Brina Palencia (2008 and 2024) (English)
A beautiful female wolf harvest deity originally from a place in the north known as Yoitsu. Holo escapes from Pasloe and begins traveling with Lawrence. Holo has chosen the form of a 15-year old girl, though she still retains her large white-tipped wolf tail, ears, and two sharp fangs. Her true form is that of a large and fearsome wolf. In human form, she has a peculiar way of speaking, modeled after that of oiran high-class courtesans. She is able to speak to humans as a wolf.
Holo refers to herself as "Holo the Wise Wolf" (ヨイツの賢狼, Yoitsu no Kenrō; Wise Wolf of Yoitsu). She is typically haughty and self-sufficient, but due to past isolation, she is often lonely. She appears in the sequel light novel series Wolf and Parchment.
Yarei (ヤレイ, Yarei)
Voiced by: Tomokazu Sugita (2024) (Japanese); Austin Tindle (2024) (English)
A farmer of Pasloe who has a long history of facilitating deals with Lawrence, whom he was childhood friends with. On the day Lawrence passes through Pasloe, Yarei "catches the wolf" in the town's yearly harvest festival. Instead, Holo escapes to a larger sheaf of wheat in Lawrence's wagon.
Chloe (クロエ, Kuroe)
Voiced by: Kaori Nazuka (2008) (Japanese); Jamie Marchi (2008) (English)
A villager of Pasloe who has known Lawrence for a long time. She is an original character in the 2008 anime series, serving as a major antagonist and replacing Yarei.
Norah Arendt (ノーラ・アレント, Nōra Arento)
Voiced by: Mai Nakahara (2008 and 2024) (Japanese); Leah Clark (2008 and 2024) (English)
A skilled and beautiful young shepherd from a church-town named Ruvinheigen. Her companion in this profession is a well-trained sheep dog named Enek (Enekk in the anime).
Fermi Amati (フェルミ・アマーティ, Ferumi Amāti)
Voiced by: Saeko Chiba (2008 and 2024) (Japanese); Ryan Reynolds (2008 and 2024) (English)
A young man who works as a fish broker. Like Lawrence, he mainly goes by his surname for business. He is interested romantically in Holo.
Dian "Diana" Rubens (ディアン・ルーベンス, Dian Rūbensu)
Voiced by: Akeno Watanabe (2008 and 2024) (Japanese); Colleen Clinkenbeard (2008 and 2024) (English)
A chronicler living in Kumersun's walled ghetto with other "suspect" persons such as alchemists.She loves to collect Pagan tales.
Mark Cole (マルク・コール, Maruku Kōru)
Voiced by: Rikiya Koyama (2008 and 2024) (Japanese); Ian Sinclair (2008 and 2024) (English)
A town merchant and a wheat seller in Kumersun. He and his apprentice, Eu Landt, assist Lawrence in his contest with Amati. He is the first merchant that Lawrence comes to accept as a true friend and not just a business associate.
Elsa Schtingheim (エルサ・シュティングハイム, Erusa Shutinguhaimu)
Voiced by: Lynn (2024) (Japanese); Madeleine Morris (2024) (English)
A young girl who serves as the priest at the church of Tereo. She was picked up by Father Franz at a young age and raised in the church. At first, she is wary of Lawrence, an outsider, and has a surly attitude, but seems to open up to Evan.
Gyoam Evan (ギヨーム・エヴァン, Giyōmu Evuan)
Voiced by: Atsushi Abe (2024) (Japanese); Jordan Dash Cruz (2024) (English)
A boy who grinds wheat in a watermill near the village of Tereo.
Eve Bolan (エーブ・ボラン, Ebu Boran)
Voiced by: Romi Park (2008) (Japanese); Stephanie Young (2008) (English)
A mysterious merchant from the port town of Lenos. She is a fallen noble who was once sold as a bride to another merchant after her family's fall. When he died, she started her own business. She is naturally wary and goes about her trade dressed as a man. Her real name is Fleur von Eiterzental Mariel Bolan.

== Media ==
=== Light novels ===
Spice and Wolf began as a light novel series written by Isuna Hasekura, with illustrations by Jū Ayakura. Hasekura entered the debut volume into ASCII Media Works' twelfth Dengeki Novel Prize in 2005 and won the Silver Prize. ASCII Media Works published 17 novels between February 10, 2006, and July 10, 2011, under their Dengeki Bunko imprint. The tagline for the novels is "Merchant meats spicy wolf.", an example of Engrish. The author of the novels has commented that what "meats" in the tagline really means is kept a secret, alluding to a possible intentional misspelling of "meets".

In celebration of the series' 10th anniversary, Hasekura began writing a sequel in the 49th volume of Dengeki Bunko Magazine, released on April 9, 2016. In 2016, publication of new books in the main series resumed with the release of the eighteenth volume, along with the start of a spin-off series titled Wolf and Parchment: New Theory Spice & Wolf, (Note: In Japanese: Shinsetsu Ōkami to Kōshinryō Ōkami to Yōhishi (新説 狼と香辛料 狼と羊皮紙)) focusing on Myuri, Lawrence and Holo's daughter, and Cole.

In September 2008, the novels were licensed by Yen Press for distribution in English. The first volume was released in December 2009, and a new volume was released every four months. While Yen Press redesigned the cover of the first novel, a dust jacket retaining the original cover art was released to select online retailers, and Yen Press also bundled the same jacket in the December 2009 issue of their manga anthology magazine Yen Plus. Despite the different cover art, the illustrations within the novels remain unchanged. Yen Press later announced that future volumes of the series and reprints of the first volume would retain the original artwork while dust jackets would carry the new covers, citing that the redesigned covers were requested by retailers in order to appeal to a wider audience. Yen Press has also licensed the Wolf and Parchment series, with the first volume released in November 2017.

=== Manga ===
A manga adaptation illustrated by Keito Koume began serialization in the November 2007 issue of ASCII Media Works' seinen manga magazine Dengeki Maoh. The first tankōbon volume was released by ASCII Media Works under their Dengeki Comics imprint on March 27, 2008, ending with the release of the sixteenth and final volume of the main series in 2018.

A manga adaption of Wolf and Parchment by Hidori began serialization in the July 2019 issue of Dengeki Maoh. Yen Press has licensed both the main and spin-off manga series, and has begun releasing it in English in North America.

=== Anime ===
==== 2008 series ====
An anime adaptation produced by the animation studio Imagin aired in Japan between January 9 and March 26, 2008, on the Chiba TV Japanese television network; twelve of the thirteen episodes were broadcast, with episode seven being a DVD exclusive. The series is directed by Takeo Takahashi, written by Naruhisa Arakawa, and has character designs by Kazuya Kuroda. Takahashi was quoted as being a big fan of the novels. The opening theme is "Tabi no Tochū" (旅の途中) by Natsumi Kiyoura, and the ending theme is "Ringo Biyori: The Wolf Whistling Song" (リンゴ日和 ～The Wolf Whistling Song) by Rocky Chack; both maxi singles were released on February 6, 2008. The anime's original soundtrack was released on March 12, 2008.

The episodes were released by Pony Canyon in six DVD compilation volumes in Japan between April 2, 2008, and August 29, 2008; volume one contains three episodes while the subsequent volumes contain two episodes each, with the third volume containing an original video animation (OVA) episode along with episode six of the television broadcast. A Blu-ray Disc box set of the series was released on January 30, 2009. The anime is licensed for release in English by Kadokawa Pictures USA and Funimation Entertainment, and a complete thirteen-episode DVD box set was released on December 22, 2009. The series made its North American television debut on November 16, 2010, on the Funimation Channel.

A second season of the anime titled Spice and Wolf II had twelve episodes air in Japan between July 9 and September 24, 2009. Most of the staff from the first season returned, except for Toshimitsu Kobayashi replacing Kazuya Kuroda as the character designer and chief animation director, and animation being done by Brain's Base and Marvy Jack instead of Imagin. The voice actors from the first season reprised their roles. Another OVA, animated by Brain's Base and Marvy Jack, was released bundled with a picture book entitled Spice and Wolf: Wolf and Gold Wheat (「狼と香辛料」狼と金の麦穂, Ōkami to Kōshinryō Ōkami to Kin no Mugiho), which was written and illustrated by the same creators of the light novels and released by ASCII Media Works on April 30, 2009, under their Dengeki Bunko Visual Novel imprint. Funimation licensed Spice and Wolf II and released the series in English on August 30, 2011. The second season made its North American television debut on August 31, 2011, on the Funimation Channel. On September 11, 2012, Funimation released a Blu-ray/DVD combo pack of both season, which included the 2009 OVA.

==== 2024 series ====
A new anime adaptation was announced on February 25, 2022, for the light novel's 15-year anniversary. It was confirmed to be a remake, titled Spice and Wolf: Merchant Meets the Wise Wolf, produced by Passione and directed by Hijiri Sanpei, with Takahashi returning as chief director, Kevin Penkin composing the music, and both Fukuyama and Koshimizu returning to reprise their roles as Lawrence and Holo respectively. The series aired from April 2 to September 24, 2024, on TV Tokyo and its affiliates. (Note: TV Tokyo list the series premiere on April 1, 2024 at 25:30, which is effectively April 2 at 1:30 a.m. JST.) The first opening theme song is "Tabi no Yukue" (旅のゆくえ; lit. 'Journey's Destination'), performed by Hana Hope, while the first ending theme song is "Andante" (アンダンテ), performed by ClariS. The second opening theme song is "Sign", performed by Aimer, while the second ending theme song is "Ringo to Kimi" (りんごと君; The Apple and You), performed by NeRiAme. Crunchyroll streamed the series outside of Asia. In March 2024, Netflix announced that it would be streaming the series in select Asian regions. Following the finale of the first season, a second season was announced. It is set to premiere in January 2027.

=== Internet radio shows ===
An Internet radio show hosted by Animate called Ōkamikku Radio (オオカミックラジオ) aired ten episodes between December 7, 2007, and April 25, 2008. One episode was broadcast every other week on Friday, and the show was meant to promote the anime series. The show is hosted by Jun Fukuyama who plays Kraft Lawrence in the anime, and Ami Koshimizu who plays Holo. The show contains eight corners, or parts to each broadcast which includes news about the series, comments and submissions from listeners, and a radio drama. A second radio show titled Ōkamikku Radio II aired ten episodes between June 10 and October 28, 2009, with the same producer and hosts.

=== Video games ===
Spice and Wolf: Holo's and My One Year, (Note: In Japanese: Ōkami to Kōshinryō Boku to Horo no Ichinen (狼と香辛料 ボクとホロの一年)) a dating and business simulation visual novel based on the series, was developed by ASCII Media Works for the Nintendo DS and released on June 26, 2008, in Japan. It never had an official Western release, but received a fan translation into English by AGT Team on February 20, 2021, under the localized title Spice and Wolf: My Year With Holo. The player assumes the role of a nameless character (the titular "Boku", who closely resembles Kraft Lawrence). In exchange for cheaply obtaining Holo's wagon, he promises to help her find her hometown before the year's end by using his merchant skills to purchase information. In the meantime, the player raises their intimacy with her via story-based event scenes, potentially resulting in different endings. The story differs from that of the original novels or anime, and is presented as an alternate universe. Ami Koshimizu voices Holo in the game. The game was released on the same day in limited and regular editions; the limited edition was sold at a higher price, but came with a life-sized poster of Holo among other bonuses.

A sequel, also by ASCII Media Works for Nintendo DS, was released on September 17, 2009, in Japan, titled Spice and Wolf: The Wind that Spans the Sea. (Note: In Japanese: Ōkami to Kōshinryō Umi o Wataru Kaze (狼と香辛料 海を渡る風)) The player once again assumes the role of Kraft Lawrence. A fan translation of the game into English has been done by the AGT Team.

A virtual reality adventure game titled Spice and Wolf VR (Note: In Japanese: Ōkami to Kōshinryō VR (狼と香辛料VR)) and made by Spicy Tails, a doujin group founded by Isuna Hasekura, was released on June 3, 2019, for Microsoft Windows supporting the Oculus Rift and HTC Vive VR headsets as well as the standalone Oculus Go headset. It was later released for the Nintendo Switch and PlayStation 4 on September 5, 2019, supporting the Nintendo Labo VR Kit and PlayStation VR respectively. A port to the Oculus Quest headset was released in November 2019. Its sequel, Spice and Wolf VR2, (Note: In Japanese: Ōkami to Kōshinryō VR2 (狼と香辛料VR2)) was released on December 10, 2020.

=== Other media ===
In April 2008, the maid café Cafe with Cat in Akihabara, Tokyo, Japan hosted a specially themed event called Cafe with Wolf for a period of three days between April 4 and April 6. The event included three new items on the menu and tied in with the sale of the first anime DVD volume which went on sale on April 2, 2008. People who bought the DVD from the Comic Toranoana Akihabara Honten store (which is on the first floor below Cafe with Cat) and brought the receipt with them into Cafe with Wolf were entered into a lottery to win rare Spice and Wolf goods.

== Reception ==
=== Sales ===
ASCII Media Works reported that by December 2009, the novel had sold over 3.5 million copies. By October 2020, it had sold over 5 million copies. The first manga volume of the English release in North America debuted at No. 4 on The New York Times Best Seller Manga list, while the third volume reached No. 3.

=== Critical reception ===
In a retrospective review of the 2008 anime, Michael Basile of Anime News Network acclaimed it as an "incredibly fascinating and captivating work". He commended the story's "shockingly wide" and detailed handling of economics, which he felt enhanced the world's realism and made for a complex plot. He also praised the show's portrayal of Holo and Lawrence, who had "perfect chemistry" and "wonderful, often poignant exchanges". Basile saw their romantic relationship as a particularly strong point, with their dialogue allowing "romantic encounters to soar", and concluded by calling the show an "absolute delight" to watch.

=== Accolades ===
The light novel series has ranked three times in Takarajimasha's yearly light novel guidebook Kono Light Novel ga Sugoi!: first in 2007, and fifth in both 2008 and 2009. In the 2007 issue, Holo won Best Female Character as well. In 2009, Japanator ranked the anime as the 48th best of the decade.

== Notes and references ==
Footnotes

Citations
