= Isuna Hasekura =

Japanese author (born 1982)

Isuna Hasekura 支倉凍砂
- Born: December 27, 1982 (age 43); Chiba Prefecture, Japan
- Occupation: Novelist
- Writing career
- Notable work: Spice and Wolf
- Notable awards: Silver Prize at the 12th Dengeki Novel Prize for Spice and Wolf

Isuna Hasekura (支倉 凍砂, Hasekura Isuna; born December 27, 1982) is a Japanese novelist. In 2005, Hasekura won the Silver Prize in the twelfth Dengeki Novel Prize with his debut novel Spice and Wolf. He published the first volume of the manga the following year.

== Early life ==
Hasekura studied at Rikkyo University.

== Works ==
=== Spice and Wolf series ===
Hasekura began publishing the light novel series Spice and Wolf in February 2006, which currently consists of 24 volumes. It quickly became his most critically acclaimed and influential work to date and has spawned many adaptations and spinoffs including anime, manga, and video games. Following the success of Spice and Wolf, in 2016, Hasekura created a sequel series under the working title Wolf and Parchment.

=== Billionaire Girl series ===
A manga about a lonely girl who is a successful day trader and an average college student who is hired by her for the purpose of tutoring her, but not only. The manga is completed with 3 volumes.

=== World End Economica series ===
A three-part visual novel series, developed by Spicy Tails, the scenario of which is written by Isuna Hasekura. The plot sets in the far future on the moon, 16 years after humans have begun to colonize it. It begins on a young man's impossible dream of standing where no man had stood. And to do that he needs large amount of capital that can only be obtain through risky means via the stock markets.

All three episodes have been localised in English and made available through Steam. A successful Kickstarter campaign ensured that the series would be made available in English along with a HD graphic upgrade.

=== Project LUX ===
A VR game developed by Spicy Tails, with Isuna Hasekura listed under "Project/Scenario".
