= Opera (Japanese magazine) =

Japanese manga magazine

- Issue 75 of Opera, published February 2020
- Categories: BL manga
- Frequency: Quarterly
- Publisher: Akane Shinsha
- First issue: December 15, 2005; 20 years ago
- Country: Japan
- Website: akaneshinsha.com/opera/

Opera (Japanese: オペラ) is a quarterly Japanese boys' love (BL) manga magazine. The magazine is published by Akane Shinsha, which launched Opera in 2005 as a successor to its earlier quarterly BL anthology magazine Edge. Notable titles serialized in Opera include Classmates, Go For It, Nakamura!, and the BL works of Natsume Ono. (Note: Published under the pen name "basso".)

== History ==
The first issue of Opera was published on December 15, 2005. The magazine is a successor to Edge, Akane Shinsha's previous quarterly BL magazine that ran from May 2004 to April 2005; titles serialized in Opera are published as tankōbon volumes by Akane Shinsha under their Edge Comix imprint. New issues of Opera are published on a quarterly basis.

In 2018, Opera opened a pop-up cafe in Harajuku, Tokyo featuring original merchandise and menu items inspired by titles serialized in the magazine. The cafe operated from March 16 to April 8, 2018. A second pop-up cafe opened in Ikebukuro, Tokyo in 2019.

== Serializations ==
=== Current ===
- Classmates by Asumiko Nakamura (2006 – present), consisting of:
  - Dou Kyu Sei (2006–2007)
  - Sotsu Gyo Sei – Winter (2008)
  - Sotsu Gyo Sei – Spring (2009)
  - Sora and Hara (2009–2011)
  - O.B. (2012–2013)
  - Blanc (2018–2020)
  - Home (2020–2022) (Note: Formerly known as "Futarigurashi")
  - Sajou Rihito no Chichi to Sono Buka (2022 – Current)
- Motto Ganbare! Nakamura-kun!! by Syundei (2017 – present)

=== Former ===
- Kuma to Interi by basso (2005)
- Lies are a Gentleman's Manners by Marta Matsuo (2005–2010)
- Orso E Intellettuale by basso (2005–2010), (Note: Initially serialized in Edge beginning in 2004.) consisting of:
  - Amato Amaro (2005)
  - Gad Sfortunato (2007–2009)
  - Al to Neri to Sono Shuuhen (2008–2010)
- Naka-san no Nagare by basso (2007–2011)
- Tokyo Shinjū by Totempole (2008–2010)
- Senpai by Bikke (2010–2011)
- Canis by ZAKK (2012–2020)
- Buchou wa Onee by Nagabe (2013–2015)
- Go For It, Nakamura! by Syundei (2014–2016)
- Itou-san by Sui Kuraka (2014–2015)
- Total Eclipse of the Eternal Heart by Syundei (2015)
- The Wize Wize Beasts of the Wizarding Wizdoms by Nagabe (2015–2017)
- I: Itou-san 2 by Sui Kuraka (2016–2017)
- Double Mints by Asumiko Nakamura (2017) (Note: Special one-shot chapter only; original series serialized in Mellow Mellow)
- Odoru Omaera To Daimeiwaku by Beruno Mikawa (2017)
