= Quzilax =

Japanese manga artist

Quzilax (Japanese: クジラックス) is a Japanese manga artist best known for creating erotic manga, some of which have drawn public attention and controversy.

== Career ==
Quzilax debuted in adult manga in 2008 with Manadeshi! in COMIC RiN after earlier recognition under the pen name Ikagawa Hoeru in a Young Sunday monthly award.

Quzilax's notoriety was shaped early by the dōjin work Geiger Counter (がいがぁかうんたぁ), which depicts an underage girl placed into abusive and coercive sexual situations.

In Loli Tomodachi (ろりともだち), published by Akane Shinsha, Quzilax depicts a male protagonist whose internal thoughts dominate the story as he becomes sexually involved with underage girls. The work presents the girls primarily as figures through whom his inner turmoil is processed and expressed.

With Utaite no Ballad (歌い手のバラッド), serialized in Comic LO, Quzilax constructs a story about a man who gains attention as an online utaite singer on Nico Nico Douga and becomes sexually involved with underage girls as his visibility increases. As the story unfolds, the girls approach him because they admire his presence and feel a personal connection through his online persona. Sexual encounters occur as a direct extension of that relationship, with the girls reacting in different ways once they are involved with him.

=== Other work ===
Quzilax is credited with providing an ending illustration card for the 2014 anime series Black Bullet. The illustration was included as part of the series' Blu-ray and DVD release materials, where individual episode ending cards were drawn by guest illustrators.

== Police contact following criminal case ==
In June 2017, Japanese media reported that Quzilax had been contacted by Saitama Prefectural Police following a criminal case in which a suspect stated that he imitated content from an adult manga. According to HuffPost Japan, police arrested a 35-year-old man on suspicion of forcible indecency and trespassing, and investigative sources said he claimed to have modeled his actions on Quzilax's 2013 adult dojinshi Geiger Counter.

After Mainichi Shimbun reported that police had requested consideration to prevent imitation and encourage warnings that the depicted acts constituted crimes, Quzilax issued a public statement on Twitter describing his interaction with police and explaining his personal response to the suspect's testimony. HuffPost Japan reported that Quzilax stated that both he and the police shared the sentiment that such an incident should never happen again.

== Themes and influences ==
In an interview with Kimi Rito, a Japanese researcher known for commentary on otaku culture, Quzilax described his creative approach as centered on male protagonists, psychological deterioration, and personal identification with flawed characters, stating that he often builds stories from men's anxieties.

Quzilax cited influences including Parasyte by Hitoshi Iwaaki, works by Inio Asano, and manga depicting social alienation and moral failure, and characterized his work as adult manga that incorporates narrative structure and social themes alongside erotic content.

Quzilax characterizes his creative process as one that places reality before fiction, stating that he often takes inspiration from news events and rejecting the idea that his manga cause crime, instead asserting that "reality is more cruel" than what is depicted on the page.

== Reception ==
Quzilax's works are received as confrontational and disturbing for their proximity to real-world harm, earning a reputation as part of the "yabai manga" label.

Nonoha Nazuna, a Japanese adult video actress and manga artist, describes encountering Quzilax's manga at a young age and reacting with shock and fascination. She presents him as a creator whose stories feel real and unsettling because of how closely they follow the inner reactions of his characters. According to her account, his manga are not read casually but experienced as something closer to watching a film.

BugBug treated Quzilax's manga Utaite no Ballad as a notable erotic manga release distinguished by its explicit narrative focus and its engagement with contemporary entertainment culture. The publication emphasized that the manga directly addresses the realities of sexual harm mediated through social media and idol fandom, characterizing the work as an erotic manga that confronts problems embedded in modern online entertainment culture.

In annual rankings published by Comic Toranoana's online magazine Tora-tsū OnLine, Quzilax's adult manga Loli to Bokurano ranked second in the 2012 Adult Commercial Magazine annual ranking.

== Legacy ==
Quzilax's work has been referenced by Natalie in coverage of the stage production Ame no Pa!—Odoru Koneko to Yūren, which draws in part on his manga Loli Tomodachi and is framed as an "adult narcissistic" story incorporating ghost motifs.

In December 2019, Otapol reported that Quzilax's adult manga Geiger Counter was officially announced for live-action adult video adaptation, prompting mixed reactions online. The article quoted responses that questioned the decision to adapt such a work into live action.
