= Classmates (manga) =

Japanese manga series by Asumiko Nakamura

- First volume of the manga series, featuring Hikaru Kusakabe (left) and Rihito Sajō (right)

同級生 (Doukyusei)
- Genre: BL, romance
- Created by: Asumiko Nakamura
- Manga
- Written by: Asumiko Nakamura
- Published by: Akane Shinsha
- English publisher: NA: JManga, Digital Manga Guild, Seven Seas Entertainment
- Imprint: Edge Comix
- Magazine: Opera
- Original run: June 2006 – present List of titles: Dou Kyu Sei June 2006 – July 2007; Sotsu Gyo Sei – Winter January – October 2008; Sotsu Gyo Sei – Spring January – August 2009; Sora and Hara December 2009 – December 2011; O.B. April 2012 – December 2013; Blanc February 2018 – September 2020; Home December 2020 – March 2022 (Note: Originally published as a spin-off in Pixiv Comic from October 2019 to January 2020.); Sajō Rihito no Chichi to Sono Buka September 2022 – April 2025
- Volumes: 9
- Anime film

Doukyusei: Classmates
- Directed by: Shōko Nakamura
- Produced by: Hanako Yamashita
- Music by: Kotaro Oshio
- Studio: A-1 Pictures
- Licensed by: NA: Aniplex of America
- Released: February 20, 2016 (Japan); May 6, 2016 (NA)
- Runtime: 60 minutes
- icon

Classmates, also known as Doukyusei (Japanese: 同級生, Hepburn: Dōkyūsei), is a Japanese manga series written and illustrated by Asumiko Nakamura. The series follows the relationship between students Rihito Sajō and Hikaru Kusakabe, who meet while attending an all-boys high school. First published in the manga magazine Opera in July 2006, Classmates has spawned multiple sequels and spinoffs: Sotsu Gyo Sei – Winter (Graduate – Winter), Sotsu Gyo Sei – Spring (Graduate – Spring), Sora and Hara, O.B., Blanc, Home, and Sajō Rihito no Chichi to Sono Buka. An anime film adaption of the first volume of the series, Doukyusei: Classmates, was produced by A-1 Pictures and released in February 2016.

== Synopsis ==
=== Dou Kyu Sei (Classmates) ===
Rihito Sajō is a quiet and intelligent student at Touichikou High School, an unexceptional all-boys high school, where he is tutored for the school's choir by classmate Hikaru Kusakabe. They begin dating after Kusakabe impulsively kisses Sajō, and grow closer over the course of the year; Kusakabe rebuffs a romantic advance on Sajō by music teacher Manabu Hara, and Sajō attends a concert where Kusakabe performs as a guitarist. On the day of his mock college entrance exam, Sajō suffers a panic attack, and reveals that his transfer to Touichikou was prompted by low test scores caused by his anxiety. Sajō takes the exam with encouragement from Kusakabe, and the two affirm their desire to remain together.

=== Sotsu Gyo Sei (Graduate) ===
In their final year of high school, Sajō is accepted to study pharmacology at Kyoto University; when his mother is diagnosed with cancer, he introduces Kusakabe to her as his boyfriend. Kusakabe intends to stay in Tokyo to pursue a career in music, and performs at a music festival in Nîmes that forces him to leave Japan until immediately before graduation. At graduation, Sajō and Kusakabe visit the classroom where they met, where they confront their divergent plans for their respective futures. Sajō confesses his love for Kusakabe, and they have sex; Kusakabe proposes they marry when they turn twenty, which Sajō accepts.

=== Sora and Hara ===
In this spin-off series, Hara has an encounter with Aoto "Sora" Sorano at a bar in Ni-chōme, but rebuffs him upon discovering he is a student at Touichikou. Sora sets up a date between Hara and Sajō after learning about their history, and Hara achieves a sense of closure on his pursuit of Sajō. Satoshi Arisaka, a teacher Hara once kissed as a student, is hired as a substitute teacher at Touichikou. Satoshi is dating Hibiki Sano, a student, and Hara intervenes to reconcile their relationship. Sorano angrily tells Hara that he needs to care more about his own happiness; they kiss, but mutually decide not to pursue a relationship for the time being.

=== Occupation to Beloved (O.B) ===
Kusakabe and Sajō pursue a long-distance relationship. After Kusakabe spends a week in Kyoto visiting Sajō, they reaffirm their desire to marry at 20 and decide to start referring to each other by their first names. Satoshi learns his daughter is getting married, and reconciles their relationship with the support of Hibiki. Sora, having graduated high school, works as a fashion model; after a chance reunion with Hara, they begin to pursue a relationship.

=== Blanc ===
Sajō, now in his final year of university and lacking a clear direction for his future, asks Kusakabe to take a break on their relationship. When his mother's cancer returns, Kusakabe agrees to be her caretaker while Sajō concludes his studies in Kyoto and Sajō's father is abroad for work; she later dies from pneumonia brought on by the illness. After Sajō fights with his father when he comes out to him, he reconciles his relationship with Kusakabe, and they wed in a commitment ceremony.

=== Home ===
Now married, Kusakabe and Sajō move into a shared apartment.

=== Sajō Rihito no Chichi to Sono Buka ===
A spin-off series focused on Sajō's father.

== Characters ==
=== Primary characters ===
Rihito Sajō (佐条 利人, Sajō Rihito)
Voiced by: Kenji Nojima (audio drama & film)
A polite and composed student in both appearance and behavior. Sajō is intelligent, but introverted and self-reflective to the point of obsessive over-analysis of his actions. He suffers from acute anxiety, which previously caused him to fail his high school entrance exams and be placed at Touichikou. As the series progresses, he pursues a degree in pharmaceutical science at Kyoto University while maintaining a long-distance relationship with Kusakabe.

Hikaru Kusakabe (草壁 光, Kusakabe Hikaru)
Voiced by: Hiroshi Kamiya (audio drama & film)
A laid-back and free-spirited student distinguished by his bleached perm haircut. Kusakabe is in many respects the exact opposite of Sajō: he is social, extroverted, and uninterested in pretenses and appearances. Though he is an unexceptional student, he is a talented musician and singer, and begins the series as the guitarist in an amateur rock band. As the series progresses, he pursues a career in music.

=== Secondary characters ===
Manabu Hara (原マナブ, Hara Manabu)
Voiced by: Hideo Ishikawa (audio drama & film)
A music teacher at Touichikou. Hara is gay and romantically interested in Sajō, but maintains a policy of never pursuing his students. He consequently has an adversarial relationship with Kusakabe, who nicknames him "Sekuhara" (セクハラ, lit. "sexual harassment"); Hara acts as a mentor to Kusakabe despite this, offering him advice on sexuality and relationships.

Aoto "Sora" Sorano (青砥空乃, Sorano Aoto)
Voiced by: Jun Fukuyama (audio drama)
A student who arrives at Touichikou as a freshman the year after Sajō and Kusakabe graduate. He is mature for his age both mentally and physically, and is thus able to sneak into bars in the gay village of Shinjuku Ni-chōme, where he initially meets Hara. After graduating high school he works as a fashion model, and pursues a romantic relationship with Hara.

Satoshi Arisaka (有坂聡, Arisaka Satoshi)
Voiced by: Nobuo Tobita (audio drama)
A teacher at Hara's school when he was a student. He was married with a wife and child but was closeted, and an incident where he and Hara kissed prompted Satoshi to leave the school. Years later, he returns as a substitute teacher at Touichikou, and he and Hara become friends.

Hibiki Sano (佐野響, Sano Hibiki)
Voiced by: Yūki Ono (audio drama)
A high school delinquent who works as a confectioner. He is in a relationship with Satoshi, despite the objections of his parents.

Komatsu (コマツ)
Voiced by: Masahiro Yamanaka (audio drama)
A friend of Hara's who later befriends Sora. Works as a fashion designer in Ni-chōme.

== Media ==
=== Manga ===
Classmates was conceived after editors at the manga magazine Opera approached Nakamura about creating a manga series for the magazine in the boys' love genre (male-male romance, also known as BL). While Nakamura had previously created works depicting male homosexuality in the erotic comics magazine Manga Erotics F, she had never created works in the BL genre; Classmates would ultimately become Nakamura's first BL series, and her first series published in a BL magazine. She has stated that she wished to create Classmates as a story about a "slow, serious love" that was "cliché" and "almost hackneyed" in its execution. For example, Nakamura chose the setting as an all-boys school – historically a common setting in BL manga – despite the fact that BL works centered on schools and students had declined in popularity at the time of Classmates' initial publication.

The series is noted as a departure from Nakamura's earlier and subsequent works, such as Double Mints and Kaori no Keishou, which typically focus on darker themes and erotic subject material. Nakamura has stated that she had created "aesthetically pleasing works" with "soft images" prior to the publication of Classmates, but did not have the opportunity to publish them. In Classmates, Nakamura stated that she wished to balance the exaggerated romance elements typical of BL with elements of realism, particularly in regards to LGBT issues and identity.

Classmates and its sequels and spinoffs have been published in Opera since 2006. Dou Kyu Sei was serialized from June 2006 to July 2007, Sotsu Gyo Sei – Winter was serialized from January to October 2008, Sotsu Gyo Sei – Spring was serialized from January to August 2009, Sora and Hara was serialized from December 2009 to December 2011, O.B. was serialized from April 2012 to December 2013, and Blanc was serialized from February 2018 to September 2020. Home was originally published as a spin-off manga series on Pixiv Comic from October 2019 to January 2020 before beginning serialization in Opera as an ongoing series in December 2020 and concluding in the March 2022 issue. Sajō Rihito no Chichi to Sono Buka (佐条利人の父とその部下; lit. 'Sajo Rihito's Father and his Subordinates') began serialization in the September 2022 issue of Opera. The series has been collected as nine tankōbon volumes published by Akane Shinsha.

In North America, the digital distribution platform JManga released an English-language translation of the first volume of Classmates under the title Doukyusei in April 2012. In 2014, Digital Manga published the first volume of the series as an eBook under its yaoi imprint Juné as Classmates; it also published the second and third volumes in the series as Graduate: Winter and Graduate: Spring. In July 2018, Seven Seas Entertainment announced that it had acquired the North American license for Classmates, and began publishing the series in June 2019. Internationally, the series has been translated into French by Boy's Love IDP, Spanish by Ediciones Tomodomo, Italian by Magic Press, and Polish by Waneko.

No.	Title	Original release date	English release date
1	Classmates; Dōkyūsei (同級生)	February 15, 2008; 978-4871829687	April 26, 2012 (JM); June 4, 2019 (SS); 978-1421588025
01. Summer; 02. Autumn; 03. His First; 04. A Complex Fool and a Simple Fool; 05. The Second Summer; 06. Sabotage
2	Sotsu Gyo Sei – Winter (Graduate: Winter); Sotsugyōsei: Fuyu (卒業生-冬-)	January 28, 2010; 978-4863491281	August 13, 2019; 978-1642750676
01. The Beginning of Winter; 02. So This Is Adulthood...; 03. Shall We Go Buy Gloves?; 04. Fitting; 05. The Person I'm Interested In; 06. The Teacher I'm Interested In; 07. Hide From the Rain; 08. When You're About to Cry
3	Sotsu Gyo Sei – Spring (Graduate: Spring); Sotsugyōsei: Haru (卒業生-春-)	January 28, 2010; 978-4863491298	November 12, 2019; 978-1642750683
01. The Tears That Don't Spill Over; 02. As You Like It (Okonomiyaki); 03. Lost in a Wild Idea (Fried Egg); 04. Jealous (Grilled Mochi); 05. Bash (Barbecue); 06. In Kyoto; 07. Graduation; 08. After School
4	Sora and Hara; Sora to Hara (空と原)	May 19, 2012; 978-4863491298	November 16, 2021; 978-1648276538
01. Hara & Sora; 02. Adult and Child; 03. Hara & Sajō; 04. Sorano & Fujino; 05. Hara & Arisaka; 06. Sora and the Drunk; 07. Sora & Hara
5	O.B.1	February 15, 2014; 978-4863494107	June 28, 2022 (Note: For the English-language release, both volumes of O.B. are published as a single omnibus edition.); 978-1648276545
01. Kusakabe and Sajō; 02. Sajō and Kinosaki; 03. Girl Talk; 04. Arisaka and Hibiki
6	O.B.2	February 15, 2014; 978-4863494114	June 28, 2022; 978-1648276545
01. Hibiki and Arisaka; 02. Sorano and Fujino; 03. Hara and Sorano; 04. Hikaru and Rihito
7	Blanc #1	September 23, 2020; 978-4863498433 (SE); 978-4863498426 (LE)	November 29, 2022 (Note: For the English-language release, both volumes of Blanc are published as a single omnibus edition.); 978-1-685793234
8	Blanc #2	October 23, 2020; 978-4863498495	November 29, 2022; 978-1-685793234
9	Home	October 4, 2022; 978-4863499188	October 14, 2025; 979-8-89373-973-2

=== Audio drama ===
Since 2008, a series of audio drama CDs that adapt the manga have been produced by A+, a division of Comic House.

List of audio drama albums with selected chart positions
Title	Year	Album details	Peak chart positions
Title	Year	Album details	JPN
Doukyusei (同級生)	2008	Released: April 25, 2008; Label: A+; Formats: CD	—
Sotsugyousei (卒業生)	2010	Released: April 2, 2010; Label: A+; Formats: CD	145
Sora to Hara (空と原)	2012	Released: October 26, 2012; Label: A+; Formats: CD	270
O.B.	2015	Released: April 24, 2015; Label: A+; Formats: CD	97
Blanc	2021	Released: October 28, 2021; Label: A+; Formats: CD	82
"—" denotes releases that did not chart.

=== Film ===
Doukyusei: Classmates (stylized as Doukyusei -Classmates-), an anime film adaptation of the first volume of Classmates, was announced by March 14, 2015 and released in theaters on February 20, 2016. The film is produced by A-1 Pictures, with its primary production staff composed of Shōko Nakamura as director, Akemi Hayashi as character designer, Chieko Nakamura as art director, and Ritsuko Utagawa as color designer. The film's soundtrack is composed by guitarist Kotaro Oshio, while its closing theme is performed by Oshio and Yuuki Ozaki of the rock band Galileo Galilei.

In North America, Doukyusei: Classmates received a limited theatrical release through distributors Aniplex of America and Azoland Pictures, which opened on May 6, 2016. The film was released in North America on Blu-ray by Aniplex of America on September 20, 2016.

=== Other media ===
Graduation Album (卒業アルバム), a Classmates art book, was published by Akane Shinsha in September 2011. A deluxe re-release was published in February 2016. Classmates was additionally included in a pop-up cafe run by Opera in Harajuku, Tokyo from March 16 to April 8, 2018. The cafe featured original merchandise and menu items inspired by the series.

== Reception ==
=== Manga ===
Classmates received positive reviews from critics. Akiko Mizoguchi, a BL researcher with the National Film Archive of Japan, commended the series for its depiction of LGBT identity, and for its depiction of LGBT issues that BL readers may not otherwise encounter in the genre. Reviewing the series for Otaku USA, Brittany Vincent called the series "a sweet little LGBTQ+-friendly love letter" and offered praise for its artwork, favorably comparing it to xxxHolic by Clamp and Mars by Fuyumi Soryo. Morgana Santilli of Comics Beat noted that while the series is not an "earth-shattering, genre-defying romance", she praised it as "a straightforward teenage romance about gay boys, rather than the type of fetishistic gay drama that populates much of the boys' love manga that are licensed by North American publishers." RightStuf called the plot "underwhelming" while commending Nakamura's artwork.

=== Film ===
Doukyusei: Classmates was positively received by critics, many of whom offered extensive praise for the film's production and animation. Jacob Chapman of Anime News Network called the film "meticulous, careful, and almost painfully sensitive in its matchless character animation", and described the story "heartwarming and fulfilling, even if its substance isn't one drop as unique as the movie's style." In his review for the Los Angeles Times, Charles Solomon called the plot "rather standard", but offered praise for film's watercolor-style animation. Cody Perez of Fandom Post called the film a "bold attempt to bring over a rather niche anime genre to theaters across the US", noting that the "beautiful animation and believable romance help to overlook the very fast pacing and inconsistent tone."

In its opening weekend, Doukyusei: Classmates opened in ninth place at the Japanese box office, grossing roughly ¥34 million in 30 theaters. The film ultimately sold 135,730 tickets in Japan, amounting to a total domestic gross of ¥201 million. Outside of Japan, the film grossed a total of USD$1.38 million.

In 2016, Doukyusei: Classmates was shortlisted for Best Soundtrack at the Newtype Anime Awards.
