= Go for It, Nakamura! =

Japanese manga series

- Cover of the Japanese bound volume

ガンバレ! 中村くん!! (Ganbare! Nakamura-kun!!)
- Genre: Boys' love; Comedy
- Manga
- Written by: Syundei
- Published by: Akane Shinsha
- English publisher: NA: Seven Seas Entertainment
- Imprint: Edge Comix
- Magazine: Opera
- Original run: December 27, 2014 – August 27, 2016
- Volumes: 1
- Manga

Go For It Again, Nakamura!
- Written by: Syundei
- Published by: Akane Shinsha
- English publisher: NA: Seven Seas Entertainment
- Imprint: Edge Comix
- Magazine: Opera
- Original run: June 28, 2017 – June 30, 2021
- Volumes: 2
- Audio drama
- Written by: Eri Hinako
- Music by: OdiakeS
- Released: September 8, 2021
- Anime television series
- Directed by: Aoi Umeki; Naoki Yoshibe (assistant)
- Written by: Aoi Umeki; Yasuko Aoki
- Music by: Ayana Tsujita
- Studio: Drive
- Licensed by: Crunchyroll; SA/SEA: Medialink
- Original network: Tokyo MX, GYT, GTV, BS11, HBC, AT-X, SBS, CTV, ABC TV, RKB, RCC
- Original run: April 2, 2026 – June 17, 2026
- Episodes: 13
- icon

Go for It, Nakamura! (Japanese: ガンバレ! 中村くん!!, Hepburn: Ganbare! Nakamura-kun!!) is a Japanese boys' love (BL) manga series written and illustrated by Syundei. The series follows the titular Nakamura, a closeted high school student who has a secret crush on his classmate. Go for It, Nakamura! was serialized in the manga magazine Opera from 2014 to 2016, collected into a bound volume by Akane Shinsha in 2017, and licensed for an English-language release by Seven Seas Entertainment in 2018. A sequel, Go For It Again, Nakamura! (もっとガンバレ！中村くん!!, Motto Ganbare! Nakamura-kun!!), was serialized from June 2017 to June 2021. An anime television series adaptation produced by Drive premiered in April 2026.

== Synopsis ==
Sixteen-year-old high school student Okuto Nakamura harbors a crush on his classmate Aiki Hirose, despite having never actually spoken to him. The strongly introverted Nakamura fantasizes about speaking to Hirose and often attempts to integrate himself into scenarios that would allow the two to interact, though the majority end in comedic failure, as Hirose does not reciprocate the same feelings initially. Nakamura is eventually able to build his confidence and grow closer to Hirose. The series concludes with the two boys developing a reciprocal friendship.

== Characters ==
Okuto Nakamura (中村 男久斗, Nakamura Okuto)
Voiced by: Kappei Yamaguchi (audio drama), Chiaki Kobayashi (anime) (Japanese); Nasim Benelkour (English)
A gay high school student. He falls head over heels in love with his classmate Aiki Hirose at first sight, but is acutely introverted and has never spoken to him. His pet is an octopus named Icchan. In chapter 11, he and Hirose finally end up becoming friends.
Aiki Hirose (広瀬 愛貴, Hirose Aiki)
Voiced by: Junko Takeuchi (audio drama), Yuki Sakakihara (anime) (Japanese); Patrick Pedraza (English)
Nakamura's classmate, and his unrequited love interest. In chapter 11 he becomes Nakamura's friend. He has incredible memory and idolizes Otogiri, their homeroom teacher. Initially, he does not reciprocate Nakamura's feelings at all, and often gets slightly uncomfortable by his constant failed attempts to woo him. However with time, he begins to grow closer to Nakamura and starts enjoying his time with him.
Sou Otogiri (乙切想, Otogiri Sō)
Voiced by: Toshihiko Seki (audio drama), Takuya Eguchi (anime) (Japanese); Peyton Howard (English)
Nakamura's homeroom teacher. Approachable and dedicated to his students, he is portrayed in the manga and anime as diligent, responsible and understanding. Later in the series, it is revealed he used to be a delinquent.
Hifumi Kawamura (川村ひふみ, Kawamura Hifumi)
Voiced by: Yuri Shiratori (audio drama), Fairouz Ai (anime) (Japanese); Gillian Lange (English)
Nakamura's classmate. A talented artist and fujoshi.
Kota Takeuchi (武内剛太, Takeuchi Kōta)
Voiced by: Yukihiro Nozuyama (anime) (Japanese); Dalton Tindall (English)
A friend of Hirose and Ryou who often goofs off and has a crush on Yuta.
Ryou Mukai (向井 亮, Mukai Ryō)
Voiced by: Atsushi Tamaru (anime) (Japanese); Weston Loy (English)
A friend of Hirose and Kota.
Yuuka Hamaoka (浜岡ゆうか, Hamaoka Yūka)
Voiced by: Makoto Koichi (anime) (Japanese); Emi Lo (English)
A friend of Hifumi and Masako.
Masako Okuda (奥田マサコ, Okuda Masako)
Voiced by: Yume Maihara (anime) (Japanese); Katie Wetch (English)
A friend of Hifumi and Yuuka.
Tsukasa Omori (大森 司, Ōmori Tsukasa)
Voiced by: Kōki Miyata (audio drama) Tsubasa Sasa (anime) (Japanese); Nate Grizzly (English)
Hirose's childhood friend and member of the drama/AV club.
Arandou Tamura (用村亜乱堂, Tamura Arandou)
Voiced by: Ai Orikasa (audio drama), Shōya Chiba (anime) (Japanese); Kyle Igneczi (English)
President of the drama/AV club.
Reiko Aokiyama (青木山麗子, Aokiyama Reiko)
Voiced by: Satsuki Yukino (audio drama), Yō Taichi (anime) (Japanese); Morgan Lauré Garrett (English)
President of the occult research club. She attempts to recruit Nakamura into joining her club despite his relentless refusals.
Kaoru Nio (仁王馨, Niō Kaoru)
Voiced by: Shunsuke Takeuchi (anime) (Japanese); Cris George (English)
A strict gym teacher.
Kosei Matsumura (松村高青, Matsumura Kōsei)
Voiced by: Kensho Ono (anime) (Japanese); Joshua Waters (English)
A middle school friend of Hirose's. His infatuation for Hirose makes him a rival of Nakamura.

== Media ==
=== Manga ===
The character Nakamura first appeared in illustrations and short web comics posted by Syundei online. In 2014, Syundei was approached by the managing editor of the manga magazine Opera to draw a comic to fill empty pages in an issue of the magazine. That comic, a one-shot that was published in the December 2014 issue of Opera, would become the first chapter of Go for It, Nakamura! Beginning in the June 2015 issue of Opera, Go for It, Nakamura! began serialization as a regular series, running concurrently in Opera with Syundei's horror manga series Total Eclipse of the Eternal Heart.

Upon its conclusion, the eleven-chapter series was collected into a bound volume by Akane Shinsha and published on May 27, 2017. On September 15, 2017, Seven Seas Entertainment announced that it would license an English-language translation of the series. The single-volume manga was published on July 3, 2018, making Go for It, Nakamura! the first boys' love manga series to be published by Seven Seas.

A sequel series, Go For It Again, Nakamura! (もっとガンバレ！中村くん!!, Motto Ganbare! Nakamura-kun!!), began serialization in Opera in June 2017. An English-language translation was published by Seven Seas Entertainment in July 2022.

No.	Original release date	Original ISBN	English release date	English ISBN
1	May 27, 2017	978-4863496330	July 3, 2018	978-1626928879
01. "Introducing Nakamura-kun!" (中村くん登場!!); 02. "The Cultural Festival Surprise!" (文化祭でドッキリ☆); 03. "His Dating Guide is a Boys' Love Manga?!" (恋の教科書はBL漫画!?); 04. "Art Can Be This Intense?!" (芸術はバクハツだ!?); 05. "The Boys Are Being Watched" (男子たちは見られてる); 06. "Miracle on the Night of Falling Stars!" (星ふる夜のキセキ!); 07. "Protect the One You Love!" (愛する人を守れ!); 08. "Heart-Pounding ☆ Audio" (トキメキ☆オーディオ); 09. "The Tragedy of G" (Gの悲劇); 10. "Observe Proper School Conduct!!" (学園の風紀を守れ!!); 11. "Twilight in Yokohama" (たそがれの横浜)
2	August 27, 2021	978-4863498792	July 5, 2022	978-1638585732
01. "Summer is a Spicy Season" (夏はスバイシーな季節☆); 02. "School's Ghost Mystery?" (学校の怪談?); 03. "Spartan Teacher, Appears!" (スパルタ教師, 登場!); 04. "A Very Jealous Man" (オ人コイ嫉妬); 05. "I'll Die For You" (君のためなら死ねる); 06. "Let's Go to the Beauty Salon!" (美容室へ行こう!); 07. "A Rival Appears!?" (ライバル登場!?); 08. "Aim For It! Macho-Man" (目指せ! マッチョメン☆); EX. "Newly Drawn" (描きおろし)

=== Anime ===
An anime television series adaptation of Go for It, Nakamura! was announced on August 16, 2024. The series will be produced by Drive and directed by Aoi Umeki, with Naoki Yoshibe serving as assistant director, Umeki and Yasuko Aoki writing series scripts, Umeki designing the characters, and Ayana Tsujita composing the music. The series was initially scheduled for 2025, but was later delayed due to "production circumstances". It premiered on April 1, 2026. The first two episodes debuted together online on Hulu on the same day, while each new episode also debuted a week earlier before the television broadcast in Japan. (Note: Tokyo MX, GYT, GTV and BS11 all list the series premiere as April 1 at 24:30, which is effectively April 2 at 12:30 a.m. JST) The opening theme song is "Shunpatsuteki ni Koi Shiyо̄" (瞬発的に恋しよう; 'Let's Fall in Love Instantly') performed by Yasuyuki Okamura and Kento Nakajima, while each episode features a different ending theme song which are pre-existing Japanese songs from the Shōwa and Heisei eras. Crunchyroll streams the series outside Asian markets. Medialink licensed the series in South and Southeast Asia.

==== Episodes ====
No.	Title	Directed by	Written by	Storyboarded by	Ending theme song	Original release date (Note: Episodes are released on Hulu and Crunchyroll one week before their televised airings.)
1	"Go For It, Nakamura-kun!!"; Transliteration: "Ganbare! Nakamura-kun!!" (Japanese: ガンバレ！中村くん！！)	Masaki Hayano	Yasuko Aoki (Studio Monado) & Aoi Umeki	Aoi Umeki	"Hatsukoi" by Kōzō Murashita	April 1, 2026
1	"Super Exciting Cooking Class!!"; Transliteration: "Dokidoki! Chōri jisshū!!" (Japanese: ドキドキ！調理実習！！)	Masaki Hayano	Yasuko Aoki (Studio Monado) & Aoi Umeki	Aoi Umeki	"Hatsukoi" by Kōzō Murashita	April 1, 2026
"Go For It, Nakamura-kun!!": Nakamura Okuto is an introverted and gay sixteen-year-old who fell in love his classmate, Aiki Hirose, at first sight during his high school entrance ceremony at Hoshimi High. After a month of having failed to speak to him, Nakamura fantasizes of plans to introduce himself to him. However, when Hirose drops his handkerchief, Nakamura races to pick it up for him over another student, embarrassing himself by accidentally stepping on it. After a moment of self-doubt, Nakamura is filled with determination to befriend Hirose. "Super Exciting Cooking Class!!": During home economics, Nakamura continues to fantasizes of Hirose, but the class is disrupted when live octopuses are discovered in a sink while their teacher is absent. Hirose and the class decide to save the octopuses from potentially being used for cooking. Nakamura, a huge fan octopuses, warns Hirose not to use fresh water, saving them. Sou Otogiri, their homeroom teacher, appears to pick up the octopuses as they had actually escaped to the biology room. Nakamura is complimented by Hirose for helping save the octopuses, but before he can ask him to be his friend, another octopus is discovered, and he gets shot in the face with ink by it when he's too embarrassed to finish his question.
2	"Panic! The Secret Bible!!"; Transliteration: "Panikku! Himitsu no baiburu!!" (Japanese: パニック！秘密のバイブル！！)	Daiki Yonemori	Yasuko Aoki (Studio Monado) & Aoi Umeki	Aoi Umeki	"Won't Be Long" by Da Bubblegum Brothers	April 8, 2026
Nakamura is a fan of a boys' love manga series called Loveable Lunches, which he seeks to use as a guide to become closer to Hirose. When a cockroach appears in Nakamura's class, he is pressured to kill it; he's initially reluctant but is immediately motivated when Hirose appears. Inspired by a chapter of Loveable Lunches, he picks up the cockroach with a folded notebook, thinking he has impressed Hirose, he gets distracted, and the bug runs down his sleeve, freaking everyone out. Hirose helps him by putting his hand under Nakamura's shirt and catching the cockroach. Nakamura feels satisfied that Hirose touched him, but disappointed he embarrassed himself. After reading more Loveable Lunches, he begins to fantasize about Hirose, but then trips, and Hirose approaches him to make sure he's okay. Hirose notices Nakamura's manga on the ground, which Nakamura quickly denies is his, so Hirose's tries to return it to the right person, while Nakamura pretends it's not his. Later, Nakamura sees Otogiri with the manga, embarrassing him further. Nakamura stops by the bookstore to buy a new copy of Loveable Lunches, but gets approached by Hirose at the BL section. Nakamura still denies reading BL, but Hirose says that he's okay with people reading what makes them happy. Before Nakamura can finish contemplating telling him the truth, Hirose asks him what manga he's getting, startled, he grabs a random book, but ends up feeling defeated when the book is inappropriate. He decides to no longer take love advice from BL.
3	"Wait, Could This Be Love?!"; Transliteration: "Moshikashite? Kore wa koi!?" (Japanese: もしかして? これは恋!?)	Umi Fujisawa (NUT)	Yasuko Aoki (Studio Monado) & Aoi Umeki	Aoi Umeki	"Konya wa Boogie Back smooth rap" by Scha Dara Parr ft. Kenji Ozawa	April 15, 2026
Hirose and his friends were chatting while cleaning the classroom. As they were cleaning, Hifumi, Yuka and Masako jokingly ships them. After cleaning, Yuka and Masako asks Hifumi, who's a fujoshi, to draw something, and she agrees. Art class starts, Nakamura complains that sketching is boring. However, the teacher points that the model will be Hirose. He considers that he sketches Hirose the best, until he sees into Kawaura's sketch, concerning her. Later, Nakamura, asks her to give the sketch, admitting that he's a big fan of her art. Kawamura changes her view towards him, she starts sketching him, shocking both Yuka and Masako. While they were teasing her, they accidentally drop the notebook in front of Nakamura. Nakamura then asks Hifumi to draw a manga where Hirose and him are friends, to which Hifumi accepts. In another day, after their PE class, Kawamura and Nakamura find a female mouse nursing her baby mice in the storage room as Hirose notices them. As they gleefully look at the mice, they're accidentally locked in the storage room and they wait for help to arrive. As night falls, Nakamura awakens from his lap and notice that both Hirose and Hifumi are lying on his shoulders. This causes Nakamura to get closer to Hirose and sniffs him, only to be found by their PE teacher, Niou. Niou tells Nakamura to not sniff people without their permission, embarrassing Nakamura. Otogiri sends the three on them home. As Hifumi appreciates Nakamura, she thinks back to the time when she saw Nakamura sniffing Hirose and wonders about them as something more.
4	"The Miraculous Magical Holy Water!!"; Transliteration: "Mirakuru! Majinai no seisui!!" (Japanese: ミラクル！まじないの聖水！！)	Yūichirō Aoki (Wit Studio)	Yasuko Aoki (Studio Monado) & Aoi Umeki	Aoi Umeki	"Makerumonka" by Barbee Boys	April 22, 2026
As Nakamura thinks about the things that both Hirose and him would do as friends on the way to school, he bumps into Hirose and Oomori walking to school together. Nakamura questions them about their friendship, but finds himself being jealous of Oomori for being childhood friends with Hirose, but considers getting intel from Oomori to get to know Hirose better. As they pass by a shop with an octopus in a fish tank, Hirose remembers Nakamura liking octopuses. As Nakamura goes on about octopus facts, he thinks back to a time in primary school, where two of his classmates call him weird for liking octopuses. This causes Nakamura to hesitate talking to Hirose. As they realise that they're gonna be late, Hirose and Oomori rush to school while Nakamura thinks that he ruined his conversation with Hirose and starts drawing on the ground with a rock. Nakamura is then spotted by Reiko, who tries to convince him to join her club. Initially she pitches it as an art club, and Nakamura almost agrees to sign up for it, until he finds out that he almost joined the occult club. Reiko desperately pleads with Nakamura to join, but he rebuffs her. Reiko then hands him a vial of "holy water" that gives him good luck. As Nakamura doesn't know what to do with the vial, he realizes that he has been interacting with Hirose a lot during the day. As Hirose asks Nakamura to walk home together, this startles Nakamura and he gladly accepts the offer. As they walk home, they both share their experiences of living with their sisters. After parting ways, Nakamura is overjoyed, but that is quickly stopped when Hirose is being stopped by three high school boys. Wanting to save Hirose, he rides his bike to the scene until he falls down into a sewer. He comes out looking like a zombie thanks to the "holy water", scaring the boys away. Hirose thanks Nakamura for saving him and Nakamura returns the vial to Reiko the next day. Reiko swears that she'll get Nakamura to join the occult club, while Nakamura finds Hirose laughing at a drawn picture of Nakamura from the incident.
5	"Vexing! Are They an Item?!"; Transliteration: "Mukamuka! Aitsura deki ten no!?" (Japanese: ムカムカ! あいつらデキてんの!？)	Chika Manganji	Yasuko Aoki (Studio Monado) & Aoi Umeki	Ai Yoshimura	"Fly-Day Chinatown" by Yasuha	April 29, 2026
As Nakamura thinks about ways to advance his friendship with Hirose, he sees Hirose and Takeuchi acting more than friends with each other, ratting Nakamura. As Nakamura observes Hirose and Takeuchi, he becomes more envious with Takeuchi and tries to teach Takeuchi a lesson for acting like a couple with Hirose. As Hirose becomes tired of this charade, Mukai asks the two of them what's going on with them, to which Takeuchi answers that he does it to gain the attention of Yuka, as well as a means to confess to her. As they both convince him to drop the act and just confess to Yuka, Takeuchi does so and Yuka accepts, but gives him a condition that Takeuchi would flirt with more boys. This gives Nakamura some much needed relief. As the days go by, it's dress code check week. As class starts, Otogiri realises that Hirose and Oomori are late. The both of them are late as the disciplinary teachers caught Hirose not having black-coloured hair. As they were about to punish a resisting Hirose by shaving his head, Otogiri tells the disciplinary teachers that he'll discipline Hirose. As Otogiri "disciplines" Hirose, this shocks everyone, including the disciplinary teachers. As Oomori and Nakamura asks if Hirose is okay, he reveals that it was an act, and this causes Hirose to admire Otogiri, which shocks Nakamura as he interprets this as Hirose having a crush on Otogiri. As Nakamura becomes paranoid of this while seeing Hirose becoming more affectionate towards Otogiri, he sees an advert about a protein shake. This causes Nakamura to get them as he thinks that Hirose likes buff guys. Nakamura becomes sick from drinking too much protein shakes and Hirose escorts Nakamura to the nurse's office, and this makes Nakamura embarrassed. While resting in the empty nurse's office with Hirose, Otogiri checks in on Hirose. Hirose asks Otogiri for his LINE ID, and Otogiri accepts, and this causes Nakamura to panic about Hirose and Otogiri. Nakamura vows to finally ask Hirose to be friends with him in the upcoming Yokohama class trip, as Hirose and Otogiri discuss about the trip.
6	"I Want to be "Friends" With You!!"; Transliteration: "Kimi to! "Tomodachi" ni naritakute!!" (Japanese: 君と！"友達" になりたくて！！)	Masaki Hayano	Yasuko Aoki (Studio Monado) & Aoi Umeki	Haruka Fujita	"Sekai de Ichiban Atsui Natsu (Heisei Recording)" by Princess Princess	May 6, 2026
On the way to Yokohama, Nakamura experiences a nightmare where Hirose falls for Otogiri, and Icchan torments him, stating that he'll never gets close to Hirose as he's an NPC. Nakamura wakes up from his nightmare and vows to ask Hirose whether they can be friends on this trip. As the class trip begins, Takeuchi forces Nakamura to take pictures, irritating Nakamura, but Nakamura uses this as a means to take more pictures of Hirose. After receiving a bad fortune from a temple, this causes Nakamura to not take the initiative to talk to Hirose. As the class decide what to get lunch, most of them follow Hifumi, Yuka, and Masako, including Takeuchi and Mukai. As Hirose, Nakamura and Oomori wonder where to get lunch, they come across Otogiri, who treats them to lunch. After lunch, Otogiri expresses his reason for becoming a teacher, so that other kids won't become like a delinquent like him when he was in high school, inspiring all three of them. This causes Nakamura to understand why Hirose would "fall" for Otogiri. As they are near an aquarium, Nakamura leaves Hirose and Oomori behind to go to the aquarium. As Nakamura laments in the aquarium, Hirose meets with Nakamura, shocking him. As they both talk about octopuses, Hirose tells Nakamura that he isn't weird for liking them, flustering Nakamura. The both of them spend the rest of the day together. As the sun sets near the pier, Takeuchi calls out for Hirose to ride the ferry together. As Hirose leaves, Nakamura stops him, telling Hirose that he shouldn't go if he doesn't want to. Hirose then rejects Takeuchi's offer. As they both sit at a bench near the pier, Nakamura gifts Hirose a crab keychain, to which Hirose expresses gratitude as Nakamura knows that Hirose likes crabs when Hirose mentioned it in the aquarium. As Nakamura musters up the courage to ask for Hirose's friendship, Hirose spots Otogiri and asks him to take a picture of them, leaving Nakamura temporarily dejected. As Hirose calls for Nakamura, Otogiri takes a picture of the both of them. Before the picture was taken, Hirose confirms that he considered Nakamura as a friend all along, and he and Nakamura were already friends.
7	"Gh-Ghost! School Ghost Stories?!"; Transliteration: "De, deta! Gakkō no kaidan!?" (Japanese: で、出た！学校の怪談！？)	Iyo Satou	Yasuko Aoki (Studio Monado) & Aoi Umeki	Shinichi Watanabe	"Rouningyou No Yakata" by Seikima-II	May 13, 2026
As summer break nearly approaches, Nakamura daydreams about the things he'll do in summer with Hirose, and resolves to ask Hirose to a cafe to discuss summer plans, but he is halted by Oomori asking a favour from Hirose. As Nakamura plans to get the new chapter of Lovable Lunches after school, he's captured by Reiko and her clubmates. They wanted to do a seance and use Nakamura as a sacrifice. The occult club is found by Tamura, the president of the drama/AV club. Tamura is inspired by Nakamura as Tamura thinks that Nakamura would be a perfect fit for his horror mokumentary as Nakamura has a sinister aura. As the rest of the class, including Hirose, enter the Occult Club room, Nakamura discovers that Oomori asked Hirose for a favour to help out with Tamura's film. As Hirose lights up and asks Nakamura whether he will be in the film, Nakamura agress, shocking Reiko and the Occult Club. Nakamura, Hirose, Oomori, Tamura, Reiko, Yuka, Masako, Hifumi, Takeuchi and Mukai enter the school at night to film the mokumentary. The group becomes separated as they see a ghost as Oomori sets up the camera. One-by-one, the students get caught by the "ghost." As Nakamura and Hirose are walking about the school hallways and discussing about horror movies, Hirose becomes scared and tightly holds on to Nakamura's belt, almost causing Nakamura to pass out from the pain. "Hirose" then holds Nakamura's hand as a result. As they find Tamura recording them, they witness the "ghost", which turns out to be Otogiri and Niou doing night patrol in school. The students are punished for entering the school after hours and as well as Tamura's camera being confiscated. As the students are about to leave, Nakamura continues to be flustered about "Hirose" holding his hand. Hirose joins the group, which petrifies Nakamura as Hirose didn't hold his hand, but a ghost did.
8	"Crisis! A Rival Appears?!"; Transliteration: "Pinchi! Raibaru tōjō!?" (Japanese: ピンチ！ライバル登場！？)	Yūichirō Aoki (Wit Studio)	Yasuko Aoki (Studio Monado) & Aoi Umeki	Aimi Yamauchi	"Runner" by Bakufu Slump	May 20, 2026
After summer break, Nakamura steels his own resolve to continue his friendship with Hirose, but thinks that he messes up after awkwardly greeting Hirose. During study break, a friend of Hirose's asks him if he could lend his PE shirt, to which Hirose accepts. As they switch classrooms for the day, Hirose's friend couldn't find Hirose to return the PE clothes, so he asks Nakamura to pass it to Hirose. Nakamura takes this as an opportunity to sniff Hirose's PE shirt and it weirded out by its strong musky smell. After it was revealed that the PE shirt belonged to Todoroki, Nakamura passes out in embarrassment and Todoroki takes Nakamura to the nurse's office. After school, Hirose checks to see if Nakamura is okay and asks if he could walk home with Nakamura, to which he accepts. At the school gate, they meet Matsumura, a friend of Hirose from middle school, who is there to have lunch with Hirose. As Hirose realises that he forgot his plans with Matsumura, he asks Matsumura whether the three of them could walk home together, leaving Nakamura dejected. As Hirose is called in by the committee advisor, he asks Matsumura and Nakamura to wait for him. As they wait for Hirose, the both of them started to talk about Hirose in middle school. Matsumura shows Nakamura physical pictures of Hirose in middle school, which weirds him out. Nakamura finds out that Matsumura isn't close with Hirose, which makes Nakamura think that Matsumura is a creep for Hirose. They both compete about who is the better friend of Hirose's with a bunch of Hirose-related stuff and anecdotes for hours. As Nakamura realises that he's winning, Matsumura reveals his trump card, Hirose's PE shirt from middle school, shocking Nakamura. As Nakamura steals the PE shirt from Matsumura, he sniffs the PE shirt, sending Matsumura into a panic. They both struggle for the shirt, but as they hear a rip, both of them realises that the shirt belonged to Todoroki. As Hirose meets them again, a dejected Matsumura and Nakamura advises Hirose to return the stuff he borrows.
9	"Pursuit! A Cultural Festival on a Starry Night!!"; Transliteration: "Tsuiseki! Hoshifuru Yoru no Bunkasai!!" (Japanese: 追跡！星降る夜の文化祭！！)	Daiki Yonemori	Aoi Umeki	Daiki Yonemori	"Friends" by Rebecca	May 27, 2026
As the cultural festival begins, Nakamura's class is doing a butler cafe for the festival. After feeling dejected that Hirose wasn't in butler uniform, a seething Nakamura helps out with the food and drinks for the cafe with an irritated Takeuchi. When Nakamura has free time to explore the festival, he wants to check out the festival with Hirose. As he's finding for Hirose, Reiko ambushes him to asks for his help with the Occult Club's seance. When Nakamura refuses, the club forces him to partake in it and Reiko gives Nakamura magical prayer beads for helping her. He then stumbles across a sick Hifumi in the art exhibit when he's looking at an octopus sculpture in the exhibit. He asks Hifumi to draw a portrait of Hirose. After getting the portrait, he spots Hirose, but is quickly blocked by a group of people wanting to try Todoroki's yakisoba. Todoroki gives Nakamura a box of his yakisoba upon hearing Nakamura's growling stomach. As Nakamura enjoys the yakisoba, Niou, dressed as a bear mascot, gives Nakamura a flyer of a play being put together by the drama club. As Nakamura wanders on the hallways, he bumps into Hirose's sister, Saho. Catching feelings for her, he wonders if he's bisexual. Nakamura then overhears Tamura's frustrations about not having enough actors for his play, and Tamura asks Nakamura if he wants to be on the play. Nakamura initially declines, but after realising that Hifumi can't help out because she's sick, he agrees. During the play, he realises Hirose's "sister" as the main lead. Forced to the stage by Tamura, Nakamura realises that the main lead is Hirose, with a wig. They are then interrupted by an overly supportive Saho. After realising that he bumped into his sister, Hirose forces Nakamura to continue the play, which was met with rousing success. After the play, Hirose's friends realise that Hirose and Sako look very much alike, and Saho treats them to some soft drinks. Oomori thanks Nakamura for his help with the play, and Nakamura realises that even though he didn't check out the festival with Hirose, he felt that the day he had was nice.
10	"A New Discovery! A Study Session After School!!"; Transliteration: "Shinhakken! Hōkago Benkyōkai!!" (Japanese: 新発見！放課後勉強会！！)	Wazuka Komemiya	Aoi Umeki	Wazuka Komemiya	"Glory Days" by Senri Oe	June 3, 2026
10	"Super Exciting! Love Bento Autograph Signing!!"; Transliteration: "Wakuwaku! Rabu-ben Sainkai!!" (Japanese: ワクワク！ラブ弁サイン会！！)	Wazuka Komemiya	Aoi Umeki	Wazuka Komemiya	"Glory Days" by Senri Oe	June 3, 2026
"A New Discovery! A Study Session After School!!": As exam season approaches, Otogiri is preparing questions for the class' maths exam. As he's about to take a smoke break, he comes across Niou who forbids him to smoke at school grounds. Otogiri then continues preparing questions for the exam. The next day, Nakamura wants to find a place to study for his maths exam. He goes to the library, only to see it filled with students preparing for exams. Hirose spots Nakamura and asks Nakamura to sit next to him, alongside Takeuchi and Mukai. As Takeuchi isn't able to concentrate due to his hunger, Hirose, Takeuchi and Mukai head to a family restaurant, inviting Nakamura along as well. In the family restaurant, Nakamura takes note on several things that Hirose enjoys, such as his favourite band, AquaPet, and a new game he's playing, Smash Fighter. Hirose asks Nakamura if he could help to refill his drinks, and Takeuchi and Mukai force Hirose to refill theirs as well. As they both bond over refilling drinks, Hirose pranks Takeuchi by putting coffee in his cola, and Takeuchi spits out the concoction on Nakamura, wetting his notes about Hirose as well. At the same time, Otogiri realises that Niou has a crush on Koori. "Super Exciting! Love Bento Autograph Signing!!": A few days later, Nakamura heads to Ikebukuro for the Lovable Lunches Exhibition. At the same time, Hifumi, Yuka and Masako also visit the exhibition as well. The girls head to the collaboration cafe while Nakamura heads to the bookstore. He spots Hifumi in the bookstore and hides from her. He realises that Hifumi is going to the autograph session, which he is also going as well. Putting on a terrible disguise, a security guard stops Nakamura from entering due to his disguise, but Hifumi recognizes Nakamura from his slouch. Hifumi tells Nakamura that she knows that he likes Lovable Lunches as she's seen him reading the manga at school. She also brought a gift for the author, which makes Nakamura panic because he didn't bring anything for the author. Hifumi gets the author's signature and a drawing of Makunouchi, and she gives the author her gift. Realizing that the time he has with the author in the session is short, a very nervous Nakamura loudly expresses his love for Lovable Lunches and his favourite character being Taku. The author expresses his love for Taku and draws Taku in Nakamura's Lovable Lunches copy, leaving Nakamura overjoyed. As Hifumi leaves Ikebukuro satisfied, Nakamura goes home overjoyed, with the author encouraging Nakamura to "Go For It!" in his signature.
11	"Grab It! The Presents Scramble!!"; Transliteration: "Tsukame! Purezento sōdatsu-sen!!" (Japanese: 掴め！プレゼント争奪戦！！)	Iyo Satou & Masaki Hayano	Aoi Umeki	Shinichi Omata	"Roman Hikou" by Kome Kome Club	June 10, 2026
11	"Makeover? The Hair Cut Challenge!!"; Transliteration: "Imechen? Heakattocharenji!!" (Japanese: イメチェン？ヘアカットチャレンジ！！)	Iyo Satou & Masaki Hayano	Aoi Umeki	Shinichi Omata	"Roman Hikou" by Kome Kome Club	June 10, 2026
"Grab It! The Presents Scramble!!": As Christmas nearly approaches, Nakamura heads to a mall to get a Christmas present for Hirose, a limited edition AquaPet T-shirt. After finding it in a store, he bumps into Matsumura who's also wanting to get the same gift for Hirose. As they squabble, someone took the last of the T-shirt and asks the cashier where to get more. As they race to another store, both Matsumura and Nakamura are caught up in situations where they are prohibited from getting to the store earlier. Nevertheless, they reach the store at the same time, just as the stock for the shirt ran out. They then head to another store to get it. Just as Nakamura heads to the store, he finds a shy lost boy and asks where his parents are. Flustered by the crying boy, Matsumura tells the boy that they'll find his parents and tells Nakamura that they'll bring the boy to the lost child center. Nakamura gives the boy a candy cane, much to the boy's delight. After the boy found his parents and the shirt ran out of stock in the third store, Matsumura plans to give something else, as Nakamura finds two octopus pen and plans to give one to Hirose. After dropping the pen, he gives Hirose the pink octopus pen, to which Hirose accepts. Nakamura finds out that Hirose's wearing the AquaPet T shirt that he pre-ordered, relieving Nakamura. "Makeover? The Hair Cut Challenge!!": After the new year, Nakamura's hair has grown long and we want to cut it; but after Kana intervenes, he accidentally cuts a chunk of it, forcing him to go to his barbershop. When the barbershop he frequents to is closed for the holidays, he goes to a trendy hairsalon, where his nerves overtake him. At the same time, Otogiri gets his hair cut from the barbershop he frequents. As the hairdresser is cutting Nakamura's hair and talks about her adventures to him, Nakamura realises that she's cutting too much hair, but a nervous Nakamura doesn't say anything. As a result, Nakamura gets a different hairstyle that leaves him shocked, and the hairdresser apologises for it by not charging his haircut. His new haircut greatly shocks Kana, and confuses Hirose when he returns to school.
12	"You and I Are "Friends"!!"; Transliteration: "Kimi to! Ore wa "Tomodachi" Dakara!!" (Japanese: 君と！俺は"友達"だから！！)	Naoki Yoshibe	Aoi Umeki	Shōko Nakamura	No ending theme song	June 17, 2026
Nakamura sees Kana preparing Valentine's Day chocolates for her friends and her crush, causing Nakamura to get chocolates to give to Hirose. During the day, Nakamura fails to give the chocolate to Hirose. After school, just as Nakamura was about to give the chocolate to Hirose, Otogiri requests Nakamura's help. After helping Otogiri, he spots Hirose near the school's entrance. Hirose nervously asks Nakamura whether he received chocolate from anyone, but Nakamura says no. Nakamura interprets Hirose's nervousness as almost a love confession, but Hirose brushes it off and leaves school. At home, Nakamura wonders if Hirose was going to confess to him, and resolves to ask Hirose if they could walk home together on the next school day. When he asks Hirose whether they could walk home together, Hirose rejects Nakamura. At the end of the day, he finds Hirose walking home with Hana, just as Takeuchi and Mukai are discussing that Hana is Hirose's girlfriend, and mentioned that Hirose and Hana have been a couple since last week. As Nakamura walks home on a road with lots of couples, he thinks that Hirose is genuinely happy with her, but this realization completely shatters him. Nakamura asks Hifumi to continue the manga, adding new drawings to the manga. A depressed Nakamura cries at home, hoping the manga Hifumi drew would make him feel better, but it doesn't. In a rush, Nakamura abruptly leaves home, just as his mother is serving dinner and bikes to a nearby hill. Utterly distraught and depressed, he contemplates that he'll never have a romantic relationship with Hirose and wonders if Hirose's happiness is his own. Nakamura's mother worries about Nakamura and wants to find him after Nakamura's dad reaches home. Kana tells her mother that she should leave him be as she thinks that Nakamura's got a lot going on.
13	"Even Then, I Love You!!"; Transliteration: "Soredemo! Kimi ga daisukide!" (Japanese: それでも！君が大好きで！)	Iyo Satou, Aoi Umeki, Daiki Yonemori	Aoi Umeki	Aoi Umeki	"Daisuki" by Yasuyuki Okamura	June 24, 2026
During the school day, a depressed Nakamura tries to be normal with the revelation of Hirose's budding relationship. Just as the school day ends, Hana bumps into Nakamura, who drops his octopus pen. Hana picks up the pen and calls it cute. As she leaves with Hirose, she notes that he has the same pen as Nakamura and Hirose tells Hana that a friend gave it to him. As he bikes home, he resolves to bury his feelings for Hirose and support Hirose's relationship with Hana. A few days later, Nakamura witnesses Hirose and Hana breaking up just as Nakamura was taking out the trash. Hirose confides in Nakamura that Hana finds him boring, and he didn't know how to interact with her, preferring to talk to a friend like him who he can talk to about anything. Nakamura tells Hirose that it's her loss as she didn't see how charming Hirose is. Hirose implores Nakamura to not tell anyone about the breakup, and Nakamura gains the confidence to ask Hirose to walk home together with him after school. As they walk home together, Hirose thanks Nakamura for looking out for him, and confides in Nakamura that he didn't understand why Hana asked him out, but is glad that someone told Hirose that they liked him. Hirose tells Nakamura that he feels better when he called Hirose charming. Nakamura tells Hirose that Hirose can confide in him whenever he wants, and walks away, but Hirose catches up with him and asks him for his LINE ID. Later, Hirose asks Nakamura out for a movie, to which Nakamura accepts, and becomes frantic for not having anything to wear. Nakamura and Hirose enjoyed the movie together, and during lunch, Hirose tells Nakamura that he doesn't really watch romantic movies, but thought it would be fun to watch it with him. As they walk to a park, Nakamura thinks that he can't make Hirose happy, even though he wants Hirose to be happy. At a kiosk in a park, Hirose asks Nakamura what's charming about Hirose. Nakamura ponders on his interactions with Hirose, and responds that everything is charming about Hirose, causing Hirose to burst out in laughter. Hirose then gifts Nakamura an octopus keychain. A touched Nakamura promises to treasure it forever; because of this, he realises that he can't let go of his love for Hirose. On the last day of school, Nakamura ponders about the different paths he and Hirose might take after the school year ends, while walking home together with Hirose. In a post-credit scene, a new school year has just begun, and Nakamura bikes to school for his second year at Hoshimi High. As he looks at the class sheet, he responds with, "Oh", hinting that Hirose is in his class again.

=== Other media ===
An audio drama adaptation of Go for It, Nakamura! was published on September 8, 2021. The adaptation features Kappei Yamaguchi as the voice of Nakamura, Junko Takeuchi as the voice of Hirose, and Tomoyuki Morikawa as the narrator, with original music by OdiakeS. A 12-page exclusive special chapter of the manga series was released with it.

Characters from Go for It, Nakamura! were included in a pop-up cafe run by Opera in Harajuku, Tokyo from March 16 to April 8, 2018. The cafe featured original merchandise and menu items inspired by the series.

== Reception ==
Go for It, Nakamura! was positively received by critics. The series was praised for its 1980s-reminiscent artwork, with Sean Gaffney of Manga Bookshelf favorably comparing it to Ranma ½ and Kimagure Orange Road. Anthony Gramuglia noted in his review of the series for Anime Feminist that Go for It, Nakamura! is "part of a new wave of [boys' love] manga that are more about identity than sex." Reviewing the series for Otaku USA, Brittany Vincent praised the series' romantic comedy elements, calling Go for It, Nakamura! a "special treat for LGBT audiences eager for a sweet, retro-flavored gay romantic comedy."

At the 2018 BL Awards presented by Chill Chill, Go for It, Nakamura! ranked 16th in the rankings of the best boys' love bound volumes released in 2017.

Syundei's depiction of Hirose's relationship with his teacher, Otogiri, as well as an imagined sexual scenario featuring Hirose and an octopus, led to online harassment from overseas viewers on her X account, resulting in her expressing doubts about continuing her manga career and deactivating the account on April 12, 2026. This led to a number of Japanese manga artists and creators to express sympathy towards Syundei and criticize the behaviors of overseas viewers. On April 22, 2026, Syundei released a statement through Hero's Web, her publishing company, apologizing for inappropriate depictions of teacher and student relationships in their past works and vowing not to include adult-minor relationships in her future works. With the release of episode 5 of the anime adaptation, she also confirmed that she had requested for the animation production company to avoid depicting Hirose and Otogiri's relationship as romantic and remove any sexually exploitative scenes of the female characters.
