= A Wish of my Sister =

Japanese manga by Masahiro Itosugi

- English edition of A Wish of my Sister as published by Icarus Publishing

お姉ちゃんのお願い (Onee-chan no Onegai)
- Genre: Erotic (Incest)
- Manga
- Written by: Masahiro Itosugi
- Published by: Akaneshinsha
- English publisher: NA: Icarus Publishing
- Magazine: Digital Comic AG
- Published: June 24, 2006
- Volumes: 1

A Wish of my Sister (お姉ちゃんのお願い, Onee-chan no Onegai) is an erotic one-shot Japanese manga written and illustrated by Masahiro Itosugi about a series of short stories, where the relationships of Keisuke, his sister and his classmate take up four of the total eight chapters. The manga is serialized in Icarus Publishing's magazine Digital Comic AG, from issue 56 in March 2007 to issue 65 in August 2007. Akaneshinsha released the manga in Japan on June 24, 2006. The manga is licensed and licensed in North America by Icarus Publishing, which released the manga in October 2008.

== Plot ==
=== A Wish of my Sister ===
Keisuke wears his older sister's underwear and she catches him in the act. She forces him to masturbate in front of her then has sex with him. She coaxes Keisuke into cross-dressing, saying that he looks like a cute girl and rewards him with sex. Keisuke's classmate, Kotomi, finds out that he cross dresses and blackmails him into having sex with her. She also did it because of her unrequited love for Keisuke.

Due to water problems in the apartment block, Keisuke's sister takes him to the public bath with him in a wig. With all the naked girls around him, Keisuke has an erection. His sister takes advantage of his predicament and has sex with him. After that, they meet Kotomi. Keisuke faints from seeing her. His sister and Kotomi carries him out of the bath to Keisuke's apartment. They put Keisuke up in a dress and themselves in maid costumes. Both girls attempt to perform fellatio on Keisuke. His sister teaches Kotomi how to perform fellatio and allows them to continue having sex while she walks out of the room.

Later, Keisuke's sister convinces him to go walk Kotomi home, and they confess their feelings in the park. His sister sits alone in the house, contemplating.

=== In Bloom ===
Takuya is a boy who is sexually teased by his sister in the bathroom. He decides to do something daring while she sleeps. When she wakes up, they have a sexual tryst together. Afterwards, his sister moves away and gets married, and he goes on to live a normal life. Only in this story is there a mention of possible pregnancy danger due to ejaculating while having unprotected sex. All other characters in the other stories doesn't seem to mind.

=== Fireworks ===
Chika has just broken up with her boyfriend and her brother sympathises with her and takes her to a local festival. Towards the end of the festival, Chika exposes her breasts to her brother, pleading him to satisfy her sexual needs. He reluctantly complies. He acknowledged on how more experienced she is.

=== Coming Out ===
Shizuru wants to buy her best friend, Mizuki, a birthday present. She asks Mizuki's friend for some ideas. Mizuki refuses to give any hints and invites Shizuru to her house. There, Mizuki reveals that he is a boy. He explains that his crossdressing was due to Shizuru's claim that she hates all boys. It is later revealed that his father and his brother are also crossdressers and gave that idea to Mizuki.

=== Mother's Milk ===
A boy named Yumi goes shopping with his mother in girls clothes. Aroused by beautiful girls, he has an erection. One of the girls notices the unusual bulge in the girls underwear. The boy's mother takes him into the girls toilets to avoid any problems. There, she has sex with him to satisfy his erection.

== Reception ==
Mania.com's John Zakrzewski criticizes the manga for prematurely ending the manga "before its material feels fully explored, and the remaining individual chapters come across like subdued introductions to eventually raunchier pieces". He comments on Itosugi's "depictions of her effeminate little boys. These supple, rounded nymphs could easily be mistaken for lolita hermaphrodites, which may well be their creator's intention". Japanator's Brad Rice commends Itosugi's "very clean, appealing, and playful" artwork. He further commends that "there will be a page or a couple of panels where the mood takes a sharp turn for the serious, and people confront the feelings that are at-hand." However his "one complaint about the book is that there are no pages that truly stick out and stay in your mind."

== See also ==
- Aki Sora - another hentai manga by the same author, which characters (Sora and Aki) are similar in appearance and actions with Keisuke and his older sister
