= Kimi ni Aisarete Itakatta =

2017 manga series

- Cover of the first Akita Shoten volume

君に愛されて痛かった (Kimi ni Aisarete Itakatta)
- Genre: Psychological drama
- Manga
- Written by: Shiruka Bakaudon
- Published by: Futabasha; Shinchosha; Akita Shoten
- Original run: 2017 – present
- icon

Kimi ni Aisarete Itakatta (Japanese: 君に愛されて痛かった) is a Japanese manga series by Shiruka Bakaudon that began publication in 2017.

The manga centers on a high school girl shaped by past bullying who becomes involved in compensated dating to satisfy a desire for validation, and follows the romantic relationship that brings a turning point in her life.

== Plot ==
The story follows Kanae, a girl traumatized by being bullied in middle school who constantly worries about how her classmates perceive her. She repeatedly engages in compensated dating to fulfill her need for approval.

After meeting a boy named Hiroshi at a group karaoke outing, her life begins to change. Kanae is gradually drawn to his acceptance of her weaknesses, but what begins as a gentle encounter develops into the beginning of a bleak and tragic sequence of events.

== Characters ==
The series features a cast of high school students whose relationships are shaped by bullying, social pressure, and emotional instability.

Kanae (かなえ)
A high school student whose past experiences with bullying have left her deeply insecure and dependent on others' validation, leading her to habitual compensated dating.
Hiroshi (寛)
A student from another school whom Kanae meets at a mixer. An aspiring baseball player aiming for Koshien, he becomes concerned about Kanae's instability and slowly develops romantic feelings for her.
Ichika (一花)
A classmate and the informal leader of Kanae's social group. She harbors feelings for Hiroshi, and when Kanae grows closer to him, Ichika becomes the main instigator of bullying against her.
Narumi (鳴海)
A delinquent boy who lives in the same housing complex as Kanae. He supports her when she is troubled and grows hostile toward Hiroshi after the latter suddenly becomes close to her.
Tomiko (とみ子)
An overweight member of Kanae's group, she is later ostracized after a particular incident. She feels suffocated by living up to the version of herself others expect, and copes with anxiety through binge eating.
Ochi (越智)
Hiroshi's childhood friend and fellow baseball devotee. Serious-minded and protective, he worries about Hiroshi's promising future and fears that his growing attachment to Kanae will distract him from the sport.

== Production ==
Shiruka Bakaudon first gained recognition through doujinshi before making a commercial debut in erotic manga with Bokobokorin!, a title that attracted attention for its extreme and disturbing content.

Bakaudon responded to claims that her work contained deliberate social messages by stating that she drew what she personally found interesting and frequently used events from her surroundings as material.

She characterized Kimi ni Aisarete Itakatta as portraying characters who make misguided efforts to reach happiness because they view those choices as their only options. She compared this to compulsive gambling, explaining that people continue such behavior for specific reasons while others merely tell them to stop without attempting to understand those causes.

=== Publication history ===
Kimi ni Aisarete Itakatta was abruptly canceled in November 2017 while it was still popular, prompting speculation that its extreme depictions were responsible and generating major discussion on social media.

The suspension followed concerns at Manga Action after editors raised objections to a chapter dominated by violent and rape imagery, arguing that publication could expose the magazine to designation under metropolitan youth ordinances. Even after the chapter was removed, the editorial board concluded that the series did not fit the magazine's direction.

Kimi ni Aisarete Itakatta later began serialization on Manga Kingdom under Shinchosha as a non-erotic work, while retaining a markedly bleak tone associated with the creator's earlier output.

The series has had an unusual publication history, having run in Manga Action, featured side stories in Monthly Comic Bunch, and previously released collected volumes through Shinchosha, before later being issued by Akita Shoten in both tankobon and single-episode digital formats. Akita Shoten reissued the work in a newly designed release.

== Themes ==
The series emphasizes psychological instability, school social hierarchies, and sustained cycles of cruelty. Kanae is depicted as obsessively apologetic and pathologically preoccupied with others' opinions, with behavior described as escalating to vomiting and repeated sexual encounters in pursuit of validation.

The surrounding cast is portrayed as deeply damaged by experiences such as severe bullying, failure, and assault, while the school environment is framed as a brutal survival system in which students who fall in status are ignored even when pleading for help. Friendship, bullying, violence, revenge, jealousy, vanity, and deceit are repeatedly presented alongside one another, and the work is characterized as an exploration of human darkness instead of conventional horror.

The manga portrays a love story at the lowest rung of society, centered on Kanae's humiliating struggle for acceptance after severe bullying in middle school and her repeated involvement in compensated dating. Bullying, sexual exploitation, and rape appear as central narrative elements and are presented as situations faced by vulnerable youths.

== Localization ==
In France, the series is published under the title Brisée par ton amour… by Meian. Originally launched in 2020, the release was halted after four volumes in 2021 due to the series' publishing situation in Japan. Following the relaunch of the manga by Akita Shoten, Meian resumed publication in 2024 with a new edition aligned with the Akita Shoten version, restarting from volume 1 and including additional content such as revised covers, author postfaces, and bonus chapters.

== Reception ==
Critical discussion of the series has often highlighted its emotionally immersive portrayal of adolescent psychology and school social dynamics. In an interview published by Comic Natalie, Aya Shibata characterized the manga as emotionally absorbing and grounded in a realistic depiction of classroom hierarchies, interpreting its narrative as an exploration of cycles of harm rooted in emotional trauma. She observed that reader responses varied widely in moral judgment and in perceptions of authorial intent, and recommended the series to both teenagers and adults for its accessible artwork and its potential to prompt reflection on personal relationships despite disturbing subject matter.

Other commentary has emphasized the work's extreme tone and bleak realism as defining qualities. Otapol described the manga as relentlessly depressing and cruel, presenting its severity as a strength and praising Bakaudon's depiction of oppressive psychological suffering and everyday brutality. Da Vinci News defended the series against criticism regarding excessive content for younger audiences, arguing that its uncompromising realism functioned as a response to increasingly restrictive norms of expression in manga and could provide recognition and emotional refuge to readers who identify with its themes. The outlet interpreted the title as expressing a girl's desperate desire to be loved and framed the work as a contemporary teenage voice that warranted attention.

Attention has also been directed toward the author's narrative technique and readability. Manga artist Quzilax praised Bakaudon's storytelling and clarity, attributing the work's impact to its ability to render disturbing material compelling rather than to shock value alone. A review published by the French outlet Manga News described the series as a deeply unsettling psychological drama that immerses readers in the fractured inner life of its protagonist, highlighting its oppressive atmosphere, intrusive internal monologue, and uncompromising depiction of adolescent trauma.
