= Aki Sora =

Japanese manga series

- Cover of the first volume

あきそら
- Manga
- Written by: Masahiro Itosugi
- Published by: Akita Shoten
- Magazine: Champion Red Ichigo
- Original run: September 2007 – April 2010
- Volumes: 6
- Original video animation
- Directed by: Takeo Takahashi
- Produced by: Masanobu Arakawa; Masaru Nagai
- Written by: Jukki Hanada
- Music by: Akira Asano
- Studio: Hoods Entertainment
- Released: December 18, 2009
- Runtime: 25 minutes
- Original video animation

Aki Sora ~Yume no Naka~
- Directed by: Takeo Takahashi
- Produced by: Masanobu Arakawa; Tatsuya Ishiguro
- Written by: Jukki Hanada; Hideaki Koyasu
- Music by: C-Clays
- Studio: Hoods Entertainment
- Licensed by: NA: Media Blasters
- Released: July 30, 2010 – November 17, 2010
- Runtime: 25 minutes each
- Episodes: 2

Aki Sora (Japanese: あきそら) is a Japanese manga series written and illustrated by Masahiro Itosugi. It was first published in September 2007 by Akita Shoten. It started serialization in the ninth volume and was concluded in Volume 25 of Akita Shoten's seinen manga magazine Champion Red Ichigo. An OVA adaptation by Hoods Entertainment was released with the third volume of the manga on December 17, 2008. A second OVA adaptation, called Aki Sora ~Yume no Naka~ (あきそら～夢の中～) was released by Pony Canyon in two parts; the first part released on July 30, 2009, and the second part released on November 17, 2009. In April 2011, Itosugi announced that there will be no more printings of volumes 1 and 3 due to Tokyo Metropolitan Ordinance Regarding the Healthy Development of Youths.

== Plot ==
Ever since he was a young child, Sora Aoi had always exchanged words of "I love you" with his attractive older sister Aki. Now, as he comes of age, he finds it much harder to exchange such comforts as they did in those simpler times. When Aki demonstrates her feelings toward him to go beyond a sister's love, Sora finds himself questioning his feelings for his sister. Realizing their affection for one another, they consummate their love in secret. In a society that would never understand, they must now keep their love a secret from their family and everyone they know. However, Sora soon finds himself exploring many forms of love with different kinds of women he met that is not accepted by society thus questioning his feelings for his sister.

== Characters ==
=== Aoi family ===
Sora Aoi (葵 ソラ, Aoi Sora)
Voiced by: Aya Saotome (drama CD), Sayaka Kinoshita (OVA 1), Kumo Shiroi (Yume no Naka)
His first name is written as 蒼空 (Sora) in kanji. He studies in the same high school as his sisters, Aki and Nami. Unlike his sisters, he is good at cooking and housework. Sora has a low alcohol tolerance, as he falls unconscious by drinking even a little sake.
Due to his upbringing without a father or any male figure in the household, as well as questionable relationships with his sisters, Sora was raised with virtually no masculinity of any kind. Almost all of his postures, behavior, and mannerisms are those typically expected from a shy girl. His effeminate appearance makes him a perfect candidate for cross-dressing, which he finds himself engaging in involuntarily because of Nami's fetish and Runa's belief that he enjoys it. He is very shy and very much a pushover, and completely lacks the will to stand up for himself against girls, which further allows him to be forced to cross-dress and be sexually approached. Indeed very much every girl around him is immediately privileged with the opportunity to rape him, which some of them did or attempted to undeterred by his discomfort and protests.
He is deeply in love with Aki, and does not resist her the second time she tries to have sex with him, but he does question himself at times whether their incest taboo should be continued, since they have no future in a relationship. He has also had sexual relationships with other people, such as Kana, Runa and Nami, though with the latter two he was forced. After being raped by Nami, who then threatened Sora with emasculation and death if anything about the rape should ever be brought to light, he became terrified of her, but claimed that he does not hate her. They eventually rekindle their relationship when Nami asked for consensual sex, and had since then become more close. In the final chapters, Sora fully accepts his relationship with Aki, even defending it against their father. When Aki is taken away by their father, Sora is lonely and wants to see her again. After Aki chooses to go away so that Sora would not be hurt by their love, Sora is heartbroken and realizes that he truly loves Aki and wants to be with her. In the final chapter, they meet at their mother's grave.

Aki Aoi (葵 アキ, Aoi Aki)
Voiced by: Uchino Pochi (drama CD), Shiho Kawaragi (OVA 1), Kōri Natsuno (Yume no Naka)
Aki is Sora's elder sister. Her first name is written as 亜希 (Aki) in kanji. Attractive, athletic, and intelligent, she’s considered a model student at school and is highly popular. However, at home, she has no culinary talents and fails to keep her own room clean. She is deeply in love with Sora. She first attempts to have sex with Sora in the shower, but is unsuccessful, as Sora runs out of the bath in embarrassment. However, her second attempt, in his room, is successful, after which she gives him a heart-felt confession of her love towards him. After that, they engage in sexual intercourse many times, including in public places, such as the school gym's storage locker, an onsen, and on top of a ferris wheel. During these times, she does not want Sora to call her nēsan (elder sister), but Sora feels weird saying her name. She seems to be unaware that he has had sex with other women, other than herself. Sora's grades drop as a result of the distraction of his relationship with his sister. In response to this Aki refuses to have sex with him until his grades improve, and she cries at the thought of her flirting being the reason that Sora is doing poorly at school. After noticing how close Sora and Nami seem to be, Aki takes him out-of-town to spend some time together alone. However, on the train there, Sora seems to reject her advances. When she tries to seduce him again at the park, they almost get caught. Ultimately, they rekindle their romance in a love hotel. However, after their father's death, Aki decides that they should end their relationship so that Sora does not get hurt any further and says goodbye to him. They later meet up at their mother's grave.

Nami Aoi (葵 ナミ, Aoi Nami)
Voiced by: Kana Ueda (OVA 1), Hiromi Igarashi (Yume no Naka)
Nami is Sora's younger sister whose features are almost completely identical to his (though in the anime her eye color is red, while Sora's eyes are brown; also, her hair is slightly darker than Sora's). Due to their similar appearance, Nami ties her hair in pigtails. Her hair is slightly longer than Sora's when let down and this is the only noticeable physical difference between them. Like Sora, Nami has a low tolerance to alcohol.
When they were children, she'd often pretend to be Sora, but as they grew up, it became apparent that their personalities are polar opposites. Unlike the quiet and well-behaved Sora, Nami is blunt and can be incredibly stubborn and harsh, and also quite eerie and threatening towards her brother. For instance, she had a habit of smashing his toys when they were children out of jealousy, and often forces Sora to cosplay for her own amusement. She has a very strong disregard for Sora's feelings, demonstrated by how she deceived him into signing up for the cosplay club for further cross-dressing, despite his clear discomfort, and upon receiving his resignation letter, she immediately tore it up in front of him without consideration.
She's in love with her classmate Kana, though the latter is completely oblivious of the fact. In spite of this, she's actively trying to get Kana and Sora together. These efforts, culminating with her bearing witness to Sora and Kana having sex together, backfire on her and drove her into a dangerously precarious state of mind. Guided by the belief that her being a female and thus lacking a penis is what keeps her and Kana separated, she assaults Sora in a fit of psychotic rage and, after almost cutting off his penis and slitting his throat with a pair of scissors, she proceeds to rape him, fantasizing during the whole act that she is making love to Kana. She obtains his silence through a death threat, and since then Nami has repeatedly had sex with Sora, rekindling their relationship and becoming more intimate. While vocally expressing her disgust at the act, she becomes more and more obsessed with it, especially right after he has sex with Kana, craving her scent. It is unknown if she herself is attracted to Sora, or having sex with him is a way to vent her frustration. She is, however, apparently regretful of what she has done to her brother, though this, coupled with their unhealthy relationship, is gnawing more and more at her already unbalanced psyche. Despite this, Aki has noted since then that the twins have become much closer to each other. Nami's relationship with Sora is later discovered by Kana, and the three end up having sex together, during which Nami's feelings towards Kana are finally revealed.

Aoi family mother (aunt)
Voiced by: Hana Aoyama (Yume no Naka)
The as-yet-unnamed mother of the Aoi family, who is actually Aki, Sora, and Nami's mother's younger sister (to be precise, their maternal aunt), but ever since her older sister — the children's real mother — was killed in a traffic accident ten years ago, she has taken over the role as mother. She took over the role of their mother, and did not tell the siblings that their real mother died. She is usually busy working to support the family, and is not there for them, leading them to learn to live for themselves. She is also somewhat irresponsible, giving Nami some sake, when she is clearly underage, and appears somehow aloof and indifferent, something that puzzled Sora more than once. There is a running gag where she is unable to tell Nami and Sora apart, even when they are naked. Every day, she thinks about whether she should live the role as a false mother, and thought of telling Sora and Nami the truth. Sora himself is starting to question her identity, as she often forgets or is even oblivious of things easily identified by their late mother. Nevertheless, after being questioned about it by Sora, she even went so far as to procure herself a scar on an arm so as to mimic the one her late sister had, much to Aki's regret. However, they noted that one day they will tell the truth to the twins. In the manga, she was portrayed to have blonde hair, but in the second OVA, she is a light brunette.

Aoi family mother (real)
The real unnamed mother of the three Aoi children, she died ten years ago, when she was hit by a car while returning home from shopping. Her role as mother was taken over by her younger sister, and only Aki knows about it. When she first gave birth to Aki, she felt the body was surprisingly light, and offered her sister a chance to hold the baby. She sustained a scar during one Christmas in a cooking accident, in which her left arm was burned while saving Sora from falling. Eventually, Sora learned of her death, when he visited her grave at the end.

Aoi family father
The unnamed father of the three Aoi children, who makes his appearance in Chapter 26. He is a big man with dark hair like Aki and is very scary-looking. He walked out on the family when the Aoi children were very young, hence why Sora and Nami do not want anything to do with him. He returns to take Aki to live with him. He caught Aki and Sora when they were making love and punished Sora for it. It is revealed that the mothers of the Aoi children (true and false) are, in fact, his sisters, having had children with one of them, but left his family because society did not accept this. He eventually dies in a hospital from an unknown illness.

=== Classmates ===
Kana Sumiya (澄弥 可奈, Sumiya Kana)
Voiced by: Tae Okajima (OVA 1), Nazuna Gogyō (Yume no Naka)
Kana is Nami’s classmate and best friend. Kana and Nami are the only members of the cosplay club. She makes female outfits for Sora and Nami forces these outfits unto her brother. She has feelings for Sora but is too shy to confess them. She is unaware of Nami's feelings towards her. Even when Nami stated she loved her, Kana believed it meant because they were friends. After a date, at which Kana gave Sora a kiss and performed oral sex on him, Nami, who was witnessing from a cupboard, snapped, leading to her raping Sora. After some persuasion from Nami later, Kana loses her virginity to Sora, which Nami secretly records. It is vaguely expressed that Kana loved Nami after this, as Kana remembers the first time she had met with Sora, and believed it was fate, because she had the chance to love a boy who looked exactly like Nami. She later stumbles upon Sora and Nami's affair and joins them in three way, where Nami's feelings for Kana are eventually revealed.

Runa Satsuki (咲月 ルナ, Satsuki Runa)
Voiced by: Soyogi Tono (CD Drama), Runa Sakaki (CD Drama)
Runa is Sora's senior at school. Ever since being forced to walk home from school only wearing her school swimsuit, she's been an exhibitionist. Sora first meets her as she was changing bare in the elevator at their apartment complex. She mistakenly thinks Sora finds cross-dressing exciting. She later forces Sora on a "fetish" date with her, where she is wearing only a raincoat, and he is cross-dressing. During the date, she forces him to masturbate to her masturbating. Later, she tricks Sora into going to a swap sex orgy with her, as her pretend-boyfriend. She loses her virginity as Sora watches; they held hands through random partners. During the summer break, she takes him to the pool, having him wear a girl's bathing suit while she painted a swimsuit on her body, and where she pleasures Sora for helping with her exhibitionism again. It is unknown whether she has any feelings for Sora, however she has stated that it is only "good" if he is the one to see her naked. Because of this she has not returned to the "party", even though asked many times. In the autumn, Runa returns as a nude art model for the art club.

Natsumi Nosaka (野坂 なつみ, Nosaka Natsumi)
Natsumi is Sora's classmate. She attended the party that Hitomi had, and was one of the many girls to have set eyes on having sex with Sora. She felt a little annoyed when Sora had difficulty at remembering her at first sight at the party. She expressed slight resentment when she heard rumors from Nami that Sora and Kana were going out.

Alice Himekawa (姫川 ありす, Himekawa Arisu)
Voiced by: Mutsuki Tsuyuko (CD Drama)
Alice is Aki's classmate. She is a beautiful girl with blond hair, girlfriend of Miharu Mihara, the school's student council president and self-proclaimed rival of Aki. As Alice is second place in the test results (under Aki), she tends to act distastefully towards Aki. Aki, however, is oblivious to this rivalry and considers them friends, much to Alice's irritation. Due to this rivalry, when Miharu asked Sora to have sex with Alice to satisfy her in his (Miharu's) place, Alice was skeptical due to Sora being Aki's brother. Regardless, Alice loved Miharu dearly, and agreed to have sex with Sora, and even gave up her virginity to him. Later, all three play a game, in which Alice has sex with Sora while Miharu watches.

Yuna Asana (朝菜 ユウナ, Asana Yūna)
Voiced by: Sakura Ichinomiya (CD Drama)
Yuna is the president of the school's art club. She agreed to let Runa take over as a substitute for the nude model in class, but noticed that the boys were looking at her more than drawing, and got angry at it. However, Runa correctly guessed that Yuna was aroused by the atmosphere. Runa later encourages her to have sex with Sora in order to overcome her embarrassment around nude males.

=== Others ===
Hitomi Tomozaki (友崎 ひとみ, Tomozaki Hitomi)
Voiced by: Kaname Yuzuki (CD Drama)
Hitomi is Runa's friend. She held the orgy party that Runa tricked Sora into going, and had her sight set on Sora at the party's start. She was the first one to have sex with Sora at the party, and her boyfriend was the one who took Runa's virginity. After this party, Hitomi invited Runa to return many times, but because Runa only felt good with Sora, she did not return.

Miharu Mihara (美原 みはる, Mihara Miharu)
Miharu is Sora's childhood friend who used to live in the same apartment complex with the Aoi family. He is younger than Sora, and Sora addresses him as "Mi-chan", and would view him as a younger brother, were it not for Miharu's tendency to cross-dress as a girl. Miharu has an effeminate appearance, similar to Sora, but unlike Sora, he likes to cross-dress. He went to Sora's school in order to ask Sora to have sex with his girlfriend, Alice, because Miharu himself has erectile dysfunction, in order to make Alice happy. Miharu is shameless, as he not only cross-dresses and asks his friend to take away his girlfriend's virginity, but also narrates about Alice and Sora having sex with vulgar phrases. He got over his conditions only when witnessing Alice and Sora having sex. However, once Sora leaves and it was his turn, Miharu became ED again. Therefore, he asks Sora to take care of Alice.

Ria Sumiya (澄弥 理亜, Sumiya Ria)
Kana's younger sister who appeared in Chapter 21 with their father to photograph Kana and Sora as wedding models. She hopes they will marry so that Nami can be her sister.

== Media ==
=== Manga ===
The Aki Sora manga, written and drawn by Masahiro Itosugi, was serialized in Akita Shoten's Champion Red Ichigo magazine between September 5, 2008, and April 5, 2011. The individual chapters are collected and released by Akita Shoten in six bound volumes between December 19, 2008, and May 20, 2011. The first and third volumes were no longer printed following July 2011 due to the Tokyo Metropolitan Ordinance Regarding the Healthy Development of Youths bill due to its depictions of incest.

==== List of chapters ====
| No. | Japanese release date | Japanese ISBN |
|---|---|---|
| 1 | December 19, 2008 | 978-4-253-23451-1 |
Chapter 1: Aki and Sora (アキとソラ, Aki to Sora); Chapter 2: The Two Soras (ソラとナミ, Sora to Nami); Chapter 3: Hide and Seek; Chapter 4: A Certain Adventure; Chapter 4.5: Some Like It Hot
Siblings Sora and Aki Aoi realize they have a sexual attraction and begin a secret relationship. Meanwhile, Sora's twin sister Nami is having trouble dealing with her feelings for her friend, Kana Sumiya, who has a crush on Sora. Sora also meets Runa Satsuki, who seeks thrills doing naughty things in public places.
| 2 | July 17, 2009 | 978-4-253-23452-8 |
Chapter 5: Welcome Home (おかえりなさい, Okaerinasai); Chapter 6: Sunday Lovers (恋人たちの午後, Koibitotachi no Gogo); Chapter 7: That Feeling That I Want To Express, That Feeling That Can Never Be Reached; Chapter 8: That Hateful Thing That Cannot Be Fulfilled; Chapter 9: When The Rain Has Stopped (雨が止んだら, Amegayandara)
It is revealed that the Aoi family's mother is actually her twin sister, their real mother having died in a road accident, with Aki being the only one who knows the truth. Runa takes Sora to an orgy where she loses her virginity. Meanwhile, Nami snaps when she witnesses Kana pleasuring Sora, becoming jealous of Sora's "thing" and raping him.
| 3 | December 18, 2009 | 978-4-253-18176-1 (with DVD); ISBN 978-4-253-23453-5 (without DVD) |
Chapter 10: Part Time Lovers; Chapter 11: Paint & Swimwear (裸の女王様, Hadaka no Jo-ō-sama); Chapter 12: Alice Oneesama's Secret; Chapter 13: Red Thread (赤い糸, Akai Itō); Chapter 14: Private Lesson (個人授業, Kojinjugyō); Chapter 15: The Secret Of Twins
Sora goes to an amusement park with Aki and to a swimming pool with Runa. He later reluctantly ends up being a replacement for Miharu Mihara, whose impotency prevents him from pleasuring his girlfriend, Alice Himekawa. Nami, who cannot forget about the time she raped Sora, consensually has sex with him.
| 4 | June 18, 2010 | 978-4-253-23454-2 |
Chapter 16: Kana and Sora (カナとソラ, Kana to Sora); Chapter 17: Mother (母親, Haha-oya); Chapter 18: Princess and Hero (姫と勇者, Hime to Yūsha); Chapter 19: Somewhere Beyond; Chapter 20: After-school Sketch (放課後のスケシチ, Hōkago no Sukecchi)
Nami encourages Sora to have sex with Kana, who are secretly filmed by Nami. Sora later gets close to discovering his "mother's" secret. Meanwhile, Sora has more sexual encounters with Aki, Alice and Runa.
| 5 | December 20, 2010 | 978-4-253-23455-9 |
Chapter 21: God is Watching (神様がみてる, Kamisama ga Miteru); Chapter 22: The Ideal Couple (理想のカップル, Risou no Kappuru); Chapter 23: Naked and Fine Art (はだかと芸術, Hadaka to Geijutsu); Chapter 24: Secret Revealed (暴露, Bakuro); Chapter 25: To Pass on Feelings (伝わる思い, Tsutawaru Omoi)
Sora, Kana and Nami attend a wedding photo shoot, where later as Nami speaks with Kana's younger sister Ria, Sora and Kana are having sex in the church. Runa helps her friend Yuna get over her fear of men by encouraging her to have sex with Sora. As Sora continues having relationships between Kana and Nami, Kana discovers Sora eloping with Nami and becomes bitter towards Nami. The two have threesomes with Sora, during one of which Nami's feelings for Kana are finally put across.
| 6 | May 20, 2011 | 978-4-253-23456-6 |
Chapter 26: Family Time (家族の時間, Kazoku no Jikan); Chapter 27: After You Leave (君去りし後, Kimi Sarishi Go); Chapter 28: Wanting to Meet (逢いたくて, Aitakute); Chapter 29: Older Sister and Younger Brother (姉と弟, Ane to Otōto); Chapter 30: Autumn Sky (あきのそら, Aki no Sora); Afterwords was dedicated to Itō Keikaku
Sora's father returns home and soon discovers Sora and Aki's forbidden relationship, taking Aki home with him. As Sora laments his loneliness, Runa allows him to pretend she is Aki whilst she has sex with him. Sora decides to go see Aki, but she refuses to go back with him as their father is dying with an illness, who reveals that he and their mother were siblings. After the father passes away, Aki and Sora say their goodbyes. The two later meet up again at their mother's grave, and the series concludes with an open ending on whether they will come back together or separate for each other's happiness.

=== OVA ===
There are two OVA adaptations of Aki Sora, both produced by Hoods Entertainment, with Takeo Takahashi as director and storyboarder, Jukki Hanada as scriptwriter and Kazuya Kuroda as character designer and chief animation director. The first OVA was released with the third volume of the manga on December 18, 2009.

A second OVA adaptation, titled Aki Sora ~Yume no Naka~ (あきそら~夢の中~, Aki Sora ~In a Dream~) was released by Pony Canyon in two parts and features a different voice cast from the first OVA. The first part was released on July 30, 2010, and the second part was released on November 17, 2010. Pony Canyon released a Blu-ray of both OVAs on September 19, 2013. The ending theme for this OVA is "Thx!" by Mai Kotouge. Media Blasters has licensed the second OVA under its Kitty imprint.

==== Episode list ====
| No. | Episode title | Original release date |
|---|---|---|
| 1 | - | December 18, 2009 |
Sora had become nervous around his older sister Aki, since he had started having lewd thoughts about her. While taking a bath together, Aki masturbates Sora, who runs off in disbelief. The next day, Sora cannot face Aki and runs off, inevitably getting locked in a store room. Aki eventually finds him and the two kiss, later returning home to make love.
| 2 | "Aki Sora: In a Dream (Part 1)" "Aki Sora ~Yume no Naka~ (Jōkan)" (あきそら～夢の中～ (上巻)) | July 30, 2010 |
Sora continues his incestuous relationship with his sister Aki, keeping it a secret from everyone else. Meanwhile, his twin sister Nami forces him to join the Fashion Research club which her friend Kana Sumiya, who has a crush on Sora, is a part of. While Sora looks after Aki, who catches a cold during one of their secret get-togethers, Nami, who is secretly in love with Kana, asks Kana to pretend she is Sora while they practice kissing.
| 3 | "Aki Sora: In a Dream (Part 2)" "Aki Sora ~Yume no Naka~ (Gekan)" (あきそら～夢の中～ (下巻)) | November 17, 2010 |
Nami persuades Kana to go on a date with Sora, but snaps when she witnesses Kana pleasuring Sora in the classroom while dodging from rain. The next day, Nami tries to confess her love to Kana, but she misinterprets it as about being best friends. Nami turns her anger towards Sora, slapping him to the floor and raping him. The two then reach to have consensual sex, with Nami ignoring Sora the next day on.

== Reception ==
Chris Beveridge commends the OVA for "good character designs, some good eroticism". He further comments, "While we get a fair bit of upper body nudity, there's no genitalia involved for those that are looking for that aspect of it ... it's not hiding the sex, but it’s also straddling the line in a way to try to appeal to more people while not going all hardcore."

== See also ==
- A Wish of my Sister – previous hentai manga by the same author, which characters (Keisuke and his unnamed sister) are similar in appearance and actions with Sora and Aki
- Yosuga no Sora – Japanese visual novel and its franchise
