= Icarus Publishing =

American comic book publisher

Icarus Publishing is an American comic book publisher established in 2002. It specializes in localizing hentai manga for the English market.

The publisher's first release was the anthology AG, which contained both original American comics and translated Japanese material. It later became focussed exclusively on Japanese manga. Trade paperback collections of the stories serialized in AG were printed from late 2004 onwards.

Icarus Publishing started releasing AG on BitTorrent peer-to-peer file-sharing network in December 2007, and AG Digital through DriveThruComics on October 24, 2008. AG was the longest running manga anthology in North America and ceased publication at issue 110. AG Digital was at first supposed to be continued online through direct and BitTorrent download.

As of May 2012, there have been no new releases since early 2010. While company website and blog are still available, the webshop has since been closed down. According to several reports the owner of Icarus Publishing, Simon Jones, has fallen severely ill, and operations are completely halted for the time being. There has been no official statement.

== Selected titles ==
- Innocence (2005)
- Slave Contract (2006)
- Midara (2006)
- Patriot (2006)
- Patchwork (2006)
- Relish (2006)
- Council of Carnality Unlimited (2006)
- Swing Out Sisters (2007)
- Anzu: The Shards of Memory (2007)
- Taboo District (2007)
- Pet Humiliation Diary (2007)
- Heat Ring of Destiny (2007)
- Blue Eyes (2008)
- Elements (2008)
- Please Miss Yuri (2008)
- A Wish of my Sister (2008)
- After School Sex Slave Club (2008)
- Extract (2008)
- Aqua Bless (2008)
- Schoolgirl Mania (2008)
- Sexual Serenade (2008)
- Mazao Chichi (2009)
- Girl with a Thousand Curses (2009)
- Miku's Sexual Orgy Diary (?)
