= Aqua Bless =

Japanese manga

- English Edition of Aqua Bless by Yamatogawa as published by Icarus Publishing

アクアブレス (Akua Buresu)
- Genre: Hentai
- Manga
- Written by: Yamatogawa
- Published by: Akaneshinsha
- English publisher: NA: Icarus Publishing Project-H FAKKU
- Magazine: Comic Tenma
- Published: February 2007
- Volumes: 1

Aqua Bless (アクアブレス, Akua Buresu) is a Japanese hentai manga written and illustrated by Yamatogawa. The manga was serialized in Akane Shinsha's manga magazine Comic Tenma. Akaneshinsha released the manga in Japan in February 2007. The manga was licensed in North America by Icarus Publishing, which released the manga on November 4, 2008. Digital Manga, under its Project-H imprint, acquired the license for both digital and print in North America in 2014; it was reprinted in 2016 as part of a stretch goal for a Kickstarter campaign. As of 2021, the license is owned by Fakku, who released it digitally on June 3, 2021 and physically in December 2021.

== Reception ==
Mania.com's Matthew Alexander commends Yamatogawa's art, stating "The author does an excellent job expressing a wide variety of character emotions through their facial expressions. Panel sizes and shapes are varied with plenty of half and full page pictures. Backgrounds are fairly sparse, but highly detailed for an eromanga when present." Alexander has also listed Aqua Bless as one of the top three Icarus Publishing titles in 2008. Derek Guder, writing for the online appendix to Manga: The Complete Guide, also commends the manga with "it’s a rare [sic] for hentai manga to step beyond the bounds of the usual clichés, and even rarer to find one that marries genuinely inventive sexual fantasies with adorable artwork free of the usual gross exaggerations or fetishes."
