= Comic LO =

Japanese manga magazine

- Cover of the October 2002 issue
- Categories: Lolicon
- Frequency: Monthly (2004–2023); Bimonthly (Since 2023)
- First issue: October 2002
- Company: Akane Shinsha
- Country: Japan
- Language: Japanese
- Website: Official website

Comic LO (COMIC(コミック)エルオー, Komikku Eru Ō), abbreviated as LO, is a Japanese lolicon-focused erotic manga magazine. The magazine has been published by Akane Shinsha since the October 2002 issue released on September 20, 2002, and was published irregularly until May 2004, when it became a monthly magazine. In August 2023, the magazine became bimonthly. The "LO" stands for "lolita only", reflecting its focus on fictional young or young-looking girl characters. The Magazine has since become a staple of lolicon subculture, inspiring offshoots magazines such as Towako (永遠娘, Eternal Daughter) which is themed more after lolibabas.

== History ==
When first published, Comic LO helped trigger a small boom in lolicon manga in the early 2000s.

Comic LO was originally an extra issue of other erotic magazines, but it became independent on December 21, 2005. On May 22, 2010, the publisher put out an announcement to stop the illegal uploading of the magazine on its official website. In December 2015 a glimpse of the standards of Comic LO were brought forward regarding the artwork. Amagappa Shōjogun, a manga artist for the magazine, was told to draw more girls that look like 9-year-olds as 8 was too young.

The cover illustrations are by Takamichi. Volume 250 was published on April 21, 2026.

In 2023, Comic LO shifted to a bimonthly publication schedule, with issues released once every two months starting in August, on even-numbered months. That same year, it was announced on their own Pawoo that Comic LO would be launching their eBook specific line of issues titled Comic LOE, with each issue since focusing on a very specific theme shared across all stories before moving onto a different theme the next issue.
