= Akane Shinsha =

Japanese publishing company

- Industry: Books; Magazines; Manga
- Founded: 4 October 1976
- Headquarters: Tokyo, Japan
- Key people: Takuma Miyamoto (representative director)
- Revenue: ¥10.000.000
- Subsidiaries: Comic HIGH (Comic KOH), Comic LO, Comic Rin, Comic Sigma, Comic Tenma, Edge Comix, Flow Comics, Girls forM, Juicy, Ripe Story, Stella Comic,...
- Website: http://www.akaneshinsha.co.jp

Akane Shinsha (茜新社; meaning "Madder New Company") (AS) is a Japanese publishing company focused on adult material, such as comics (a.k.a. manga) books, and magazines. The company was established in October 1976.

In 2009, with 65 titles it ranked 2nd among ero-manga publishers in Japan, surpassed only by Core Magazine with 76, and surpassing TI Net (44), Kubo Shoten (42) and Kill Time Communication (41).

At MangaGamer's panel at the 2011 Otakon, MG announced they are expanding their business into digital distribution of Akane Shinsha's erotic manga.

== Adaptations ==
=== Anime ===
Some of the manga created by the company were notable enough to be adapted into anime OAVs. These include:

- Vanilla Series:
  1. Seme Chichi (based on 2009 manga) animation by Y.O.U.C., produced by Digital Works
    1. Episode 1 released 10 September 2010
    2. Episode 2 released 10 December 2010
  2. Maid-Ane (based on 2010 manga, two OVAs in 2011 that are 27 minutes each) produced and distributed by Digital Works
    1. Episode 1 released 19 August 2011
    2. Episode 2 released 16 December 2011
  3. First Love (ファースト ラブ) by Akiomi Osuzu (based in April 2011 manga, three OVAs in 2012 that are 27 minutes each) was produced by Digital Works and distributed by MS Pictures
    1. First Love 香澄 released 16 March 2012
    2. First Love 千夏 released 15 June 2012
    3. First Love 真琴 released 19 October 2012
- Gogo no Kōchō (based in October 2011 manga Junai Mellow) released 21 September 2012

=== English manga ===
Digital Manga Inc. has translated and published at least 5 of the works created by Yamatogawa (originally published in the Tenma Comics line) in North America including:

1. Aqua Bless
2. Boing Boing
3. How Good was I?
4. Power Play!
5. Witchcraft

== Artists employed ==
- Ryō Ramiya published at least 5 works under the company:
  1. Nijiiro Daireikai (匂艶大霊界, June 1990, ISBN 4-7901-0002-2
  2. Cruceanu Alex (ミルキ-モ-ニング, August 1993, ISBN 4-87182-072-6
  3. Pretty Afternoon (プリティアフタヌーン, October 1993, ISBN 4-87182-083-1
  4. Misty Twilight (ミスティートワイライト, November 1993, ISBN 4-87182-086-6
  5. Silky Midnight (シルキー ミッドナイト, December 1993, ISBN 4-87182-090-4
- Ayato Sasakura publishes under Comic RIN prior to her work illustrating the Shakugan no Shana manga from 2005 to 2011, including:
  1. Shōjo-ryū kōfuku kakushu-ron (少女流幸福攫取論, 2004, ISBN 4-87182-678-3).

== Publications ==
=== Comic Tenma magazine ===
Established in 1998 includes titles:

1. Aqua Bless (アクアブレス) by Yamatogawa published 24 February 2007
2. Witchcraft by Yamatogawa published 14 March 2008
  - translated into English
3. Tsuki to Taiyō (月と太陽19 Moon and Sun) by Syatikamaboko published March 2009
4. Tayu Tayu (たゆたゆ "Boing Boing") by Yamatogawa published 24 April 2009
5. Seme Chichi (せめ ♥ ちち) by Erect Sawaru (エレクトさわる) published 26 September 2009
  - adapted into a 2-episode anime OVA in 2010
6. Taihen Yokudekimashita? (たいへんよくできました "how good was I?") by Yamatogawa published 18 December 2009
7. Kaichō no Iinari (会長のいいなり！Student Council President's Slave) by Syatikamaboko published 21 May 2010
8. Maid-Ane (メイド姉) by Maguro Teikoku (まぐろ帝國 Tuna Empire) published 23 July 2010
  - adapted into a 2-episode anime OVA series in 2011
9. Imako System (イマコシステム) by Midori no Rūpe published 25 September 2010
10. First Love (ファースト ラブ) by Akiomi Osuzu published 28 April 2011
  - adapted into a 3-episode anime OVA series in 2012
11. Junai Mellow (純愛メロウ Pure Love Mellow) by Jun published 14 October 2011
  - adapted into a 1-episode anime OVA in 2012
12. Power Play! (Powerプレイ！) by Yamatogawa published 24 February 2012
13. Sensei to Issho (先生といっしょ) by Syatikamaboko published 23 March 2012
14. Nikuman Ko (にくまん娘 Hot, Juicy & Cute Girls in Comics) by Warashibe published 10 August 2012
15. Ane-Koi (姉恋) by Yuzuki N Dash and Buruman (ぶるまん) by Blmanian both published 27 April 2012

=== Comic LO magazine ===
Established in 2002

=== Comic Rin magazine ===
Established in 2004 includes titles:

=== Comic Sigma magazine ===
Established in 2006 includes titles:

=== Tenma Comics ===
Not to be confused with the "Comic TENMA" magazine, this line of comics includes several subsidiaries:

1. TENMACOMICS EX
2. TENMACOMICS LO
3. TENMACOMICS RIN
